= Charles C. Wilson =

American actor (1894–1948)

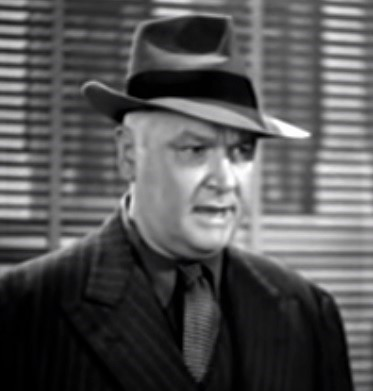
- Wilson in Lady Gangster (1942)
- Born: Charles Cahill Wilson; July 29, 1894; New York City, U.S.
- Died: January 7, 1948 (aged 53); Los Angeles, California, U.S.
- Other name: Charles Wilson
- Occupation: Actor
- Years active: 1918–1948

Charles Cahill Wilson (July 29, 1894 – January 7, 1948) was an American screen and stage actor. He appeared in numerous films during the Golden Age of Hollywood from the late 1920s to the late 1940s.

== Biography ==
Charles Wilson began his acting career at the theatre, including roles in six Broadway plays between 1918 and 1931. In 1928, he directed the Hollywood comedy Lucky Boy (1928), where he also made his film debut. According to the Internet Movie Database, Lucky Boy was Wilson's only film as a director.

His most notable role was probably Clark Gable's "wonderfully aggravated" newspaper boss in Frank Capra's comedy It Happened One Night, which won five Academy Awards in 1935. He was also cast in small roles in other Capra movies, such as Mr. Deeds Goes to Town (1936) and It's a Wonderful Life (1946).

Wilson freelanced at various studios throughout his career, but he is perhaps best known for his work at Columbia Pictures. In addition to his films for Frank Capra, Wilson also appeared prominently in Columbia serials, including The Spider's Web (1938), Batman (1943), and The Secret Code (1943), as well as in Columbia comedy shorts with Harry Von Zell, Hugh Herbert, and The Three Stooges. He played one leading role in what turned out to be his last film, Blazing Across the Pecos (1948), as the villain opposite cowboy hero Charles Starrett.

== Selected filmography ==
- Lucky Boy (1928, also director) - Bit Part (uncredited)
- Acquitted (1929) - Detective Nelson
- Broadway Scandals (1929) - Jack
- Song of Love (1929) - Traveling Salesman
- Stolen Heaven (1931) - Detective (uncredited)
- Secrets of a Secretary (1931) - Police Captain (uncredited)
- My Sin (1931) - Guest in Pool Party (uncredited)
- Hard to Handle (1933) - Jailer (uncredited)
- Infernal Machine (1933) - First Mate (uncredited)
- Elmer, the Great (1933) - Mr. Wade
- Gold Diggers of 1933 (1933) - Deputy (uncredited)
- Private Detective 62 (1933) - Bartender (uncredited)
- Heroes for Sale (1933) - 'Red' Squad Policeman #2 (uncredited)
- The Mayor of Hell (1933) - Wilson (uncredited)
- Disgraced! (1933) - Thompson, Assistant District Attorney (uncredited)
- Mary Stevens, M.D. (1933) - Walter Rising
- No Marriage Ties (1933) - Red Moran, City Desk Editor
- Footlight Parade (1933) - Policeman (uncredited)
- The Kennel Murder Case (1933) - Det. Hennessy (uncredited)
- College Coach (1933) - Charles Hauser
- Female (1933) - Private Detective Falihee (uncredited)
- Havana Widows (1933) - Mr. Timberg
- Dancing Lady (1933) - Club Manager (uncredited)
- Roman Scandals (1933) - Police Chief Charles Pratt (uncredited)
- Shadows of Sing Sing (1933)
- Miss Fane's Baby Is Stolen (1934) - Chief of Police (uncredited)
- Cross Country Cruise (1934) - Detective (uncredited)
- The Ninth Guest (1934) - Burke (uncredited)
- I've Got Your Number (1934) - Detective Welch (uncredited)
- It Happened One Night (1934) - Joe Gordon
- The Crosby Case (1934) - Detective Summers (uncredited)
- Gambling Lady (1934) - Detective Making Raid (uncredited)
- Harold Teen (1934) - 'Mac' McKinsey
- I Believed in You (1934) - Magistrate (uncredited)
- Affairs of a Gentleman (1934) - Inspector Quillan
- Fog Over Frisco (1934) - Detective Sgt. O'Hagen
- The Hell Cat (1934) - Graham
- The Circus Clown (1934) - Sheldon
- Name the Woman (1934) - Joel Walker
- Beyond the Law (1934) - Prosecuting Attorney
- The Girl from Missouri (1934) - Police Lt. O'Sullivan (uncredited)
- The Dragon Murder Case (1934) - Det. Hennessey
- The Human Side (1934) - Furniture Buyer (uncredited)
- Embarrassing Moments (1934) - Attorney
- The Lemon Drop Kid (1934) - Warden
- The St. Louis Kid (1934) - Mr. Harris - the Trucking Company Boss
- Men of the Night (1934) - Benson
- Broadway Bill (1934) - Collins
- Behold My Wife! (1934) - Police Captain (uncredited)
- Murder in the Clouds (1934) - Lackey
- Here Is My Heart (1934) - Captain Dodge (uncredited)
- The Secret Bride (1934) - Lt. Forrest (uncredited)
- White Lies (1934) - Defense Attorney (uncredited)
- The Gilded Lily (1935) - Managing Editor
- The Little Colonel (1935) - Jeremy Higgins (uncredited)
- Car 99 (1935) - Trooper Captain Ryan
- The Great Hotel Murder (1935) - Anthony Wilson
- The Perfect Clue (1935) - District Attorney
- Princess O'Hara (1935) - Newcomb (uncredited)
- Four Hours to Kill! (1935) - Taft
- Baby Face Harrington (1935) - City Editor (uncredited)
- The Case of the Curious Bride (1935) - Ferry Captain (uncredited)
- Reckless (1935) - Newspaper Editor (uncredited)
- Men of the Hour (1935) - Harper
- Air Hawks (1935) - Tribune Editor (uncredited)
- Murder in the Fleet (1935) - Cmdr. Brown (uncredited)
- The Nitwits (1935) - Police Captain Jennings
- The Glass Key (1935) - District Attorney Edward J. Farr
- Smart Girl (1935) - Morgan (uncredited)
- After the Dance (1935) - Chief of Police (uncredited)
- Dante's Inferno (1935) - Police Inspector (uncredited)
- The Public Menace (1935) - First Detective
- Waterfront Lady (1935) - Jim McFee a.k.a. Mac
- The Case of the Lucky Legs (1935) - Police Officer Ricker
- This Is the Life (1935) - Theater Manager (uncredited)
- Rendezvous (1935) - Editor (uncredited)
- Fighting Youth (1935) - Bull Stevens
- Music Is Magic (1935) - Decker - Theatre Manager (uncredited)
- Mary Burns, Fugitive (1935) - G-Man at dancehall
- Thanks a Million (1935) - Motor Policeman Sergeant (uncredited)
- Another Face (1935) - Police Captain Spellman (uncredited)
- Show Them No Mercy! (1935) - Clifford
- We're Only Human (1935) - Star City Editor Morgan (uncredited)
- Hitch Hike Lady (1935) - Mike - a Racketeer
- Strike Me Pink (1936) - Hardie
- The Return of Jimmy Valentine (1936) - Kelley
- The Country Doctor (1936) - George - Boat Captain (uncredited)
- Big Brown Eyes (1936) - Prosecuting Attorney (uncredited)
- Mr. Deeds Goes to Town (1936) - County Hospital Guard (uncredited)
- Panic on the Air (1936) - Chief Insp. Fitzgerald
- Small Town Girl (1936) - Mr. Donaldson (uncredited)
- The Mine with the Iron Door (1936) - Pitkins
- Show Boat (1936) - Jim Green (uncredited)
- Ticket to Paradise (1936) - Detective (uncredited)
- Satan Met a Lady (1936) - Detective Pollock
- Earthworm Tractors (1936) - H.J. Russell
- 36 Hours to Kill (1936) - FBI Chief (uncredited)
- Grand Jury (1936) - Clark, Chronicle City Editor
- I'd Give My Life (1936) - Warden
- The Gentleman from Louisiana (1936) - Diamond Jim Brady
- Down the Stretch (1936) - Tex Reardon
- Three Married Men (1936) - Train Conductor
- Murder with Pictures (1936) - Assistant Editor (uncredited)
- The Magnificent Brute (1936) - Murphy
- Pigskin Parade (1936) - Yale Coach (uncredited)
- Rose Bowl (1936) - Burke (uncredited)
- Legion of Terror (1936) - Colonel McCollum
- Pennies from Heaven (1936) - Prison Warden (uncredited)
- White Hunter (1936) - Minor Role (uncredited)
- Mind Your Own Business (1936) - Detective
- Find the Witness (1937) - Charley Blair (uncredited)
- Woman in Distress (1937) - Herbert Glaxton
- Woman-Wise (1937) - Commissioner (uncredited)
- You Only Live Once (1937) - Police Inspector (uncredited)
- Girl Overboard (1937) - Editor (uncredited)
- They Wanted to Marry (1937) - Clark
- The Great O'Malley (1937) - Policeman Chiding School Bus Driver (uncredited)
- Murder Goes to College (1937) - Inspector Simpson
- Midnight Court (1937) - Police Chief (uncredited)
- Night Key (1937) - Police Capt. Wallace (uncredited)
- The Case of the Stuttering Bishop (1937) - Hamilton Burger
- The Devil Is Driving (1937) - Defense Attorney Dan Healy (uncredited)
- Roaring Timber (1937) - Sam Garvin
- One Mile from Heaven (1937) - Fletcher (uncredited)
- Broadway Melody of 1938 (1937) - Horse Auctioneer (uncredited)
- Life Begins in College (1937) - Coach Burke
- Partners in Crime (1937) - Inspector Simpson
- That's My Story (1937) - Cummings
- The Adventurous Blonde (1937) - Mortimer Gray
- Thoroughbreds Don't Cry (1937) - Horse Owner (uncredited)
- Daughter of Shanghai (1937) - Schwartz (uncredited)
- Sally, Irene and Mary (1938) - Covered Wagon Cafe Manager
- State Police (1938) - Capt. Halstead
- Little Miss Thoroughbred (1938) - Mr. Becker, the Gambler
- Prison Farm (1938) - Reardon (uncredited)
- When Were You Born (1938) - Inspector Jim C. Gregg (Taurus)
- Gateway (1938) - Inspector (uncredited)
- The Gladiator (1938) - Theatre Manager (uncredited)
- Tenth Avenue Kid (1938) - Commissioner
- Hold That Co-ed (1938) - Coach Burke
- The Night Hawk (1938) - Lonigan
- The Spider's Web (1938) - Chase
- Five of a Kind (1938) - Editor Crocker (uncredited)
- Angels with Dirty Faces (1938) - Police Lt. Buckley (uncredited)
- Little Orphan Annie (1938) - Val Lewis
- There's That Woman Again (1938) - Police Captain (uncredited)
- Fighting Thoroughbreds (1939) - Spencer Bogart
- Pardon Our Nerve (1939) - Boxing Commissioner (uncredited)
- I Was a Convict (1939) - Peterson (uncredited)
- The Lady's from Kentucky (1939) - Steward (uncredited)
- Rose of Washington Square (1939) - Police Lt. Mike Cavanaugh
- The House of Fear (1939) - Police Chief (uncredited)
- The Forgotten Woman (1939) - Gray (uncredited)
- The Cowboy Quarterback (1939) - Coach Hap Farrell
- Hotel for Women (1939) - Albert (uncredited)
- Here I Am a Stranger (1939) - Managing Editor
- Smashing the Money Ring (1939) - Capt. Kilrane
- The Roaring Twenties (1939) - Policeman (uncredited)
- The Return of Doctor X (1939) - Detective Roy Kincaid
- Invisible Stripes (1939) - Arresting Officer (uncredited)
- He Married His Wife (1940) - Warden
- Enemy Agent (1940) - Chief (uncredited)
- Gangs of Chicago (1940) - C.A. Graham - Chief of Police (uncredited)
- Sandy Is a Lady (1940) - Sergeant
- Girl in 313 (1940) - Vincent Brady, Commissioner of Police
- Millionaires in Prison (1940) - R.J. Reynolds, Sunday Editor (uncredited)
- They Drive by Night (1940) - Mike Williams (uncredited)
- Public Deb No. 1 (1940) - Sergeant (uncredited)
- City for Conquest (1940) - Bill - Man Behind MacPherson at Fight (uncredited)
- So You Won't Talk (1940) - Johnson (uncredited)
- Knute Rockne, All American (1940) - Gambler (uncredited)
- South of Suez (1940) - Guard (scenes deleted)
- Tin Pan Alley (1940) - Police Desk Sergeant (uncredited)
- Lady with Red Hair (1940) - George Martin (uncredited)
- Charter Pilot (1940) - Owen
- The Face Behind the Mask (1941) - Chief O'Brien
- Tall, Dark and Handsome (1941) - Charles, Assistant District Attorney (uncredited)
- Ride, Kelly, Ride (1941) - Racing Secretary (uncredited)
- Meet John Doe (1941) - Charlie Dawson
- Two Señoritas from Chicago (1943)
- Las Vegas Nights (1946) - Ed - Deputy Sheriff (uncredited)
- Knockout (1941) - Monigan
- Federal Fugitives (1941) - Bruce Lane
- Strange Alibi (1941) - Police Desk Sergeant (uncredited)
- Broadway Limited (1941) - Detective
- Out of the Fog (1941) - Police Inspector (uncredited)
- Two in a Taxi (1941) - Captain Melton (uncredited)
- Dressed to Kill (1941) - Editor
- The Officer and the Lady (1941) - Police Captain Hart
- Blues in the Night (1941) - Barney
- All Through the Night (1942) - Police Lieutenant at Miller's Home Bakery (uncredited)
- Blondie Goes to College (1942) - Police Sergeant (uncredited)
- The Man Who Returned to Life (1942) - Inspector Mensil (uncredited)
- Rings on Her Fingers (1942) - Captain Hurley
- Lady Gangster (1942) - Detective
- Dr. Broadway (1942) - District Attorney McNamara
- This Gun for Hire (1942) - Police Captain
- Escape from Crime (1942) - Reardon
- The Secret Code (1942, Serial) - Desk Sgt. Cullen
- My Heart Belongs to Daddy (1942) - Desk Sgt. Cullen
- Gentleman Jim (1942) - Gurney (uncredited)
- Two Señoritas from Chicago (1943) - Chester T. Allgood
- Batman (1943, Serial) - Police Capt. Arnold (uncredited)
- Silver Spurs (1943) - Mr. Hawkins
- A Scream in the Dark (1943) - City Editor (uncredited)
- Is Everybody Happy? (1943) - J. Lionel Smaltz (uncredited)
- Shine On, Harvest Moon (1944) - Stage Manager (uncredited)
- Hey, Rookie (1944) - Sam Jonas
- Roger Touhy, Gangster (1944) - Police Capt. After Hay Wagon Crash (uncredited)
- Silent Partner (1944) - North Hollywood Cop (uncredited)
- Man from Frisco (1944) - Key Man (uncredited)
- Shadows in the Night (1944) - Sheriff (uncredited)
- Kansas City Kitty (1944) - Mr. Hugo (uncredited)
- Crime by Night (1944) - District Attorney Hyatt
- The Big Noise (1944) - Train Conductor (uncredited)
- My Buddy (1944) - Chief Detective
- Irish Eyes Are Smiling (1944) - Detective (uncredited)
- The Missing Juror (1944) - Mac Ellis--Newspaper Editor (uncredited)
- Eadie Was a Lady (1945) - Berger (uncredited)
- Brewster's Millions (1945) - Charlie - the Stage Director (uncredited)
- Two O'Clock Courage (1945) - Brant - City Editor (uncredited)
- The Chicago Kid (1945) - Butler (uncredited)
- Incendiary Blonde (1945) - Mr. Ballinger (uncredited)
- Week-End at the Waldorf (1945) - Hi Johns
- Road to Utopia (1945) - Official Policeman (uncredited)
- Scarlet Street (1945) - Watchman (uncredited)
- Because of Him (1946) - City Editor (uncredited)
- Crime of the Century (1946) - Police Lieutenant
- I Ring Doorbells (1946) - The Inspector
- The Phantom Thief (1946) - Police Lieutenant (uncredited)
- Passkey to Danger (1946) - Police Sergeant
- Larceny in Her Heart (1946) - Chief Gentry
- Blonde for a Day (1946) - Chief of Police Will Gentry
- Suspense (1946) - Police Officer (uncredited)
- Dangerous Business (1946) - Police Sergeant (uncredited)
- If I'm Lucky (1946) - Police Chief (uncredited)
- Gas House Kids (1946) - Inspector Shannon
- Ginger (1946) - Police Sergeant (uncredited)
- Bringing Up Father (1946) - Frank - the Hotel Doorman
- It's a Wonderful Life (1946) - Charlie (uncredited)
- The Secret Life of Walter Mitty (1947) - Police Desk Sergeant (uncredited)
- Key Witness (1947) - Warden (uncredited)
- Her Husband's Affairs (1947) - Police Captain (uncredited)
- Crime on Their Hands (1948, Short) - J.L. Cameron - Managing Editor
- Big Town Scandal (1948) - Editor of the Chronicle (uncredited)
- Blazing Across the Pecos (1948) - Mayor Ace Brockway
- Commotion on the Ocean (1956, Short) - J.L. Cameron - Managing Editor (archive footage)
