= Nan Wynn =

American singer and actress (1915–1971)

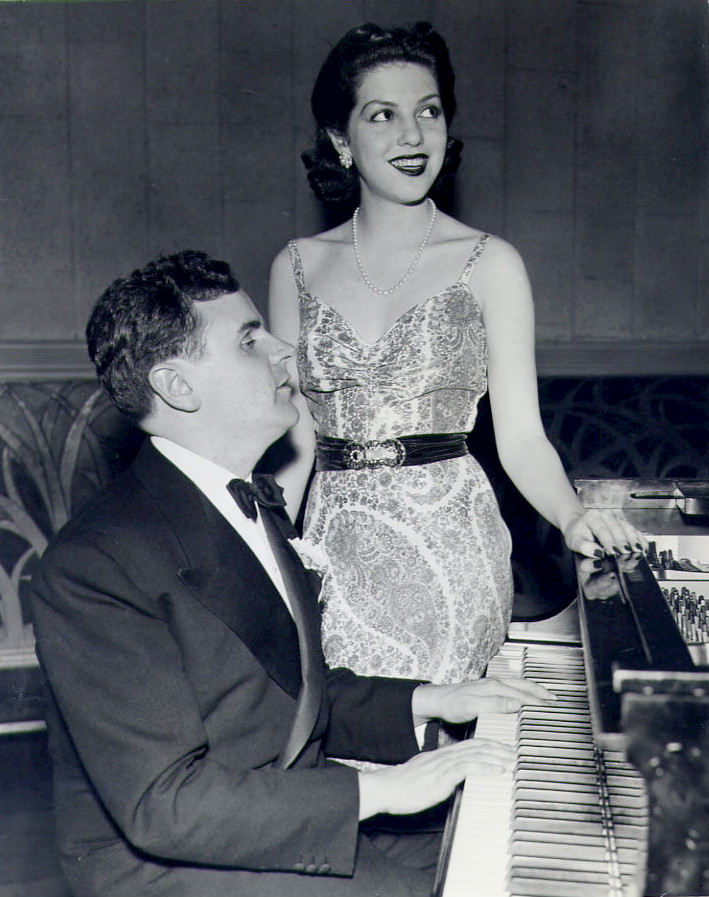
- Wynn and pianist Alec Templeton in 1941
- Born: Masha Vatz; May 8, 1915; Johnstown, Pennsylvania, U.S.
- Died: March 21, 1971 (aged 55); Santa Monica, California, U.S.
- Occupations: Singer, actress
- Years active: Mid-1930s to mid-1950s
- Spouse(s): Cy Howard (1944–1947, divorced); Thomas Baylek (1949–1952, divorced); John Small (1956–1971) (her death)
- Children: 1

Nan Wynn (née Masha Vatz; May 8, 1915 – March 21, 1971) was an American big-band singer, and Broadway and film actress. She sang and recorded throughout the 1930s and 1940s with the Emery Deutsch, Rudy Vallee, Eddie Duchin, Richard Himber, Hal Kemp, Hudson-DeLange, Raymond Scott, Teddy Wilson and Freddie Rich orchestras. For about nine months early in her career, she performed as Suzanne.

== Early years ==
Wynn was born in Johnstown, Pennsylvania, and grew up in Wheeling, West Virginia, where she attended high school, and sang in the school choir. Her father, Abe Vatz, owned a department store in Wheeling, and traveled often to New York.

== Career ==
At the age of 16, while spending a weekend in New York City with her mother, Wynn's singing came to the attention of a retired producer who was a guest at the same place. He booked Wynn at a Peekskill vaudeville house, the owner of which engaged her to sing at his two other New York State properties, in Kingston and Newburgh. After working the vaudeville circuit, the late 1930s saw Wynn landing at radio station WNEW in New York for a 13-show-per-week stint and honing her talent under the mentorship of Jimmy Rich, the singing coach to Dinah Shore, Bea Wain, and Barry Wood, among others.

Wynn is perhaps best known for dubbing Rita Hayworth's singing voice in several films, including The Strawberry Blonde (1941), My Gal Sal (1942), and You Were Never Lovelier (1942), where she introduced the Kern-Mercer standard I'm Old Fashioned.

In the late 1940s, she appeared on the Morey Amsterdam and Ed Sullivan shows. Wynn's career was cut short abruptly in 1949 by the loss of her voice following the surgical removal of a cancerous tumor, which resulted in a severed facial nerve. Refusing to accept the medical prognosis that a recovery was not possible, Wynn regained her speech and facial control by 1955, at which point she was briefly signed to RCA Victor.

== Films ==
Wynn appeared on the silver screen, often as a nightclub singer, in such films as Million Dollar Baby (1941), Pardon My Sarong (1942), Right Guy, (1943), Princess O'Rourke (1943), Is Everybody Happy? (1943), Jam Session (1944) and Intrigue (1947). She had a starring role opposite William Lundigan in the 1941 film A Shot in the Dark (1941).

== Broadway ==
Wynn appeared in Billy Rose's 1944 Broadway musical, The Seven Lively Arts and Finian's Rainbow in 1948.

== Personal life ==
Wynn was married three times. Her first husband, from 1944 to 1947, was producer, writer, and director Cy Howard (né Seymour Horowitz). In 1949, she married Dr. Thomas Baylek, with whom she had a daughter, Jane. At the time of Wynn's death in 1971, she was described as the widow of John Small.

Wynn retired from show business in 1951, following complications and facial paralysis due to her 1949 surgery, and settled into the life of a housewife in York, Pennsylvania. She eventually recovered the use of her facial muscles and became involved in the state cancer crusade in 1959, after which she appeared at American Cancer Society events for several years.

== Death ==
Wynn died of cancer on March 21, 1971, in Santa Monica, California, aged 55.

== Filmography ==
Year	Title	Role	Notes
1941	A Shot in the Dark	Dixie Waye	
1941	Million Dollar Baby	Flo	
1942	My Gal Sal	Sally Elliott	Singing voice, Uncredited
1942	Pardon My Sarong	Luana	
1943	Good Luck, Mr. Yates	Singer	Uncredited
1943	Princess O'Rourke	Nightclub Singer	
1943	Is Everybody Happy?	Kitty O'Riley	
1944	Jam Session	Nan Wynn	
1947	Intrigue	Dinner Club Singer ['Intrigue']	(final film role)
