= Constance Moore =

American singer and actress (1920–2005)

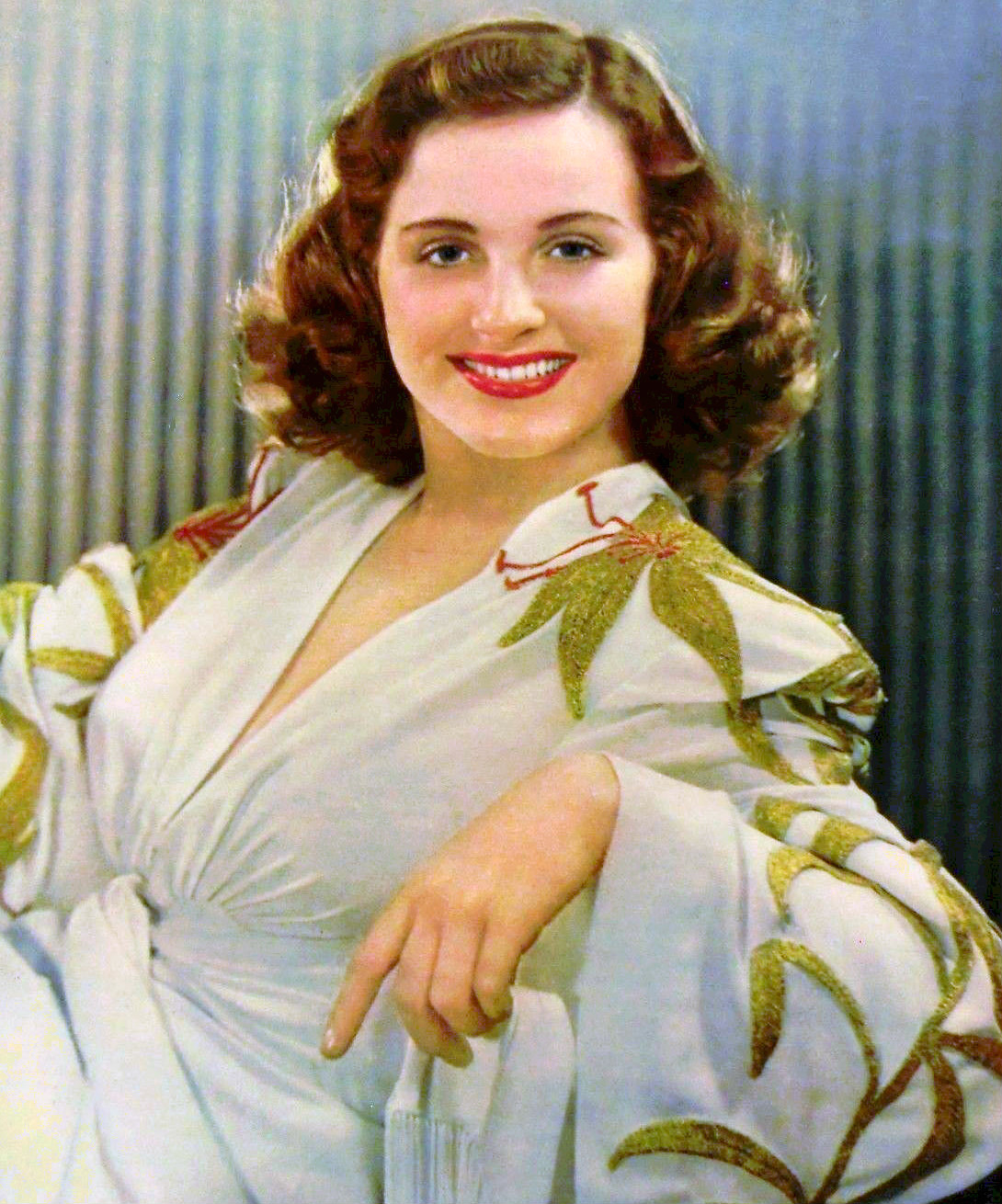
- Moore in 1941
- Born: Mary Constance Moore; January 18, 1920 or 1921 (sources differ); Sioux City, Iowa, US
- Died: September 16, 2005 (aged 84–85); Los Angeles, California, US
- Occupations: Singer, actress
- Years active: 1937–1967
- Spouse: John Maschio (m. 1939; died 1998)
- Children: 2

Mary Constance Moore (January 18, 1920 or 1921 – September 16, 2005) was an American singer and actress. She appeared in wartime musicals such as Show Business and Atlantic City and the classic 1939 movie serial Buck Rogers, in which she played Wilma Deering, its only female character.

== Life and career ==
Moore was born in Sioux City, Iowa, but her family moved away before she was a year old. She spent most of her formative years in Dallas. She had two sisters, who both survived her. She got a job as a singer in the 1930s with CBS radio. Her work impressed a scout from Universal Studios and she signed a contract with the company. Among the stars she worked with was W. C. Fields in You Can't Cheat an Honest Man (1939). She appeared on Broadway in the musical By Jupiter.

Beginning in mid-1945, Moore starred with Dennis O'Keefe on Hollywood Mystery Time on ABC radio. She retired from films in 1947 but made sporadic appearances over the next few decades. She appeared on a USO tour with Bob Hope and the Nicholas Brothers in 1951. She painted still lifes and in 1976 was the chairwoman for the Braille Institute Auxiliary in Beverly Hills, California.

Moore guest starred as Doris in the episode "Just a Housewife" (1960) on the ABC sitcom, The Donna Reed Show. In the 1961–1962 season, Moore co-starred in ten episodes on CBS as Robert Young's romantic interest in his short-lived nostalgia series, Window on Main Street.

== Personal life ==
At age 18, Moore married her agent, John Maschio, who died in 1998. The couple had two children, son Michael and daughter Gina, two grandchildren, and one great-grandchild. She was a Republican who campaigned for Thomas Dewey in 1944.

Moore died September 16, 2005, of heart failure following a long illness. She was interred at Westwood Village Memorial Park Cemetery, Los Angeles.

== Filmography ==
- Prescription for Romance (1937) - Girl (uncredited)
- You're a Sweetheart (1937) - (uncredited)
- Border Wolves (1938) - Mary Jo Benton
- Reckless Living (1938) - Girl Singer (uncredited)
- The Crime of Doctor Hallet (1938) - Susan
- State Police (1938) - Helen Evans
- The Last Stand (1938) - Nancy Drake
- Wives Under Suspicion (1938) - Elizabeth
- Prison Break (1938) - Maria Shannon
- Letter of Introduction (1938) - Autograph Seeker (uncredited)
- The Missing Guest (1938) - Stephanie Kirkland
- Freshman Year (1938) - Marian Stuart
- Swing That Cheer (1938) - Marian Stuart
- You Can't Cheat an Honest Man (1939) - Victoria Whipsnade
- Buck Rogers (1939, Serial) - Wilma Deering
- Ex-Champ (1939) - Doris Courtney
- Mutiny on the Blackhawk (1939) - Helen Bailey
- When Tomorrow Comes (1939) - Bride (uncredited)
- Hawaiian Nights (1939) - Lonnie Lane
- Laugh It Off (1939) - Ruth Spencer
- Charlie McCarthy, Detective (1939) - Sheila Stuart
- Framed (1940) - Phyllis Sanderson
- Ma! He's Making Eyes at Me (1940) - Connie Curtiss
- La Conga Nights (1940) - Helen Curtiss
- Argentine Nights (1940) - Bonnie Brooks
- I'm Nobody's Sweetheart Now (1940) - Betty Gilbert
- Las Vegas Nights (1941) - Norma Jennings
- I Wanted Wings (1941) - Carolyn Bartlett
- Buy Me That Town (1941) - Virginia Paradise
- Take a Letter, Darling (1942) - Ethel Caldwell
- Show Business (1944) - Constance Ford
- Atlantic City (1944) - Marilyn Whitaker
- Delightfully Dangerous (1945) - Josephine 'Jo' Williams / Bubbles Barton
- Earl Carroll Vanities (1945) - Drina
- Mexicana (1945) - Alison Calvert
- In Old Sacramento (1946) - Belle Malone
- Earl Carroll Sketchbook (1946) - Pamela Thayer
- Hit Parade of 1947 (1947) - Ellen Baker
