= Sunday Punch =

Sunday Punch may refer to:

- Sunday Punch (film)
- Sunday punch, a knockout blow in boxing
