= Service with the Colors =

1940 film

- Directed by: B. Reeves Eason
- Written by: Owen Crump
- Starring: Robert Armstrong
- Cinematography: Charles P. Boyle
- Release date: August 31, 1940
- Running time: 21 minutes
- Country: United States
- Language: English

Service with the Colors is a 1940 American short drama film directed by B. Reeves Eason. It was nominated for an Academy Award at the 13th Academy Awards for Best Short Subject (Two-Reel).

== Cast ==
- Robert Armstrong as Sgt. Clicker
- William Lundigan as Thomas Stanton
- Henry O'Neill as Col. Nelson
- William T. Orr as Charles Corbin (as William Orr)
- Herbert Anderson as Hiram Briggs
- George Haywood as James Taylor
