= The White Orchid =

1954 film by Reginald LeBorg

- Theatrical release poster
- Directed by: Reginald LeBorg
- Screenplay by: Reginald LeBorg; David Duncan
- Story by: Reginald LeBorg; David Duncan
- Produced by: Reginald LeBorg
- Starring: William Lundigan; Peggie Castle; Armando Silvestre; Rosenda Monteros; Jorge Treviño
- Cinematography: Enrique Wallace; Gilbert Warrenton
- Edited by: José W. Bustos
- Music by: Antonio Díaz Conde
- Production companies: Cosmos Productions; Producciones Eduardo Quevedo S.A.
- Distributed by: United Artists
- Release date: November 1954
- Running time: 81 minutes
- Country: United States
- Language: English

The White Orchid is a 1954 American adventure film directed by Reginald LeBorg and written by LeBorg and David Duncan. The film stars William Lundigan, Peggie Castle, Armando Silvestre, Rosenda Monteros and Jorge Treviño. The film was released in November 1954 by United Artists.

== Plot ==
Robert Burton, an archeologist, hears about, and decides he is going to find, a hidden civilization where little has changed in hundreds of years. Burton is accompanied on the trip by photographer Kathryn Williams. In Mexico they meet vanilla bean plantation owner Juan Cervantes who has knowledge about the forbidden city. He declines to help, not wishing to offend the natives. Williams pretends to be interested in Cervantes and is invited to his plantation. Williams tells Burton that Cervantes has agreed to guide them to the hidden civilization. They set off to Cervantes' vanilla bean plantation.

At the plantation Cervantes' sweetheart Lupita is jealous of his interest in Williams. She warns Cervantes that the woman will be the death of him. Cervantes nevertheless is talked into taking Burton and Williams to the hidden civilization. He demands that no weapon be taken, but Burton conceals a small gun that he uses to shoot a wild tapir that had startled Williams. A son of the hidden village's chief is accidentally killed by a knife set in a trap just as Williams takes his photo.

The natives believe the knife and camera together were responsible for the death, and the three intruders are taken to the hidden village at spear point. Williams is to become a human sacrifice atop a great pyramid. Burton and Cervantes free themselves from their bonds and flee with Williams. To distract the natives Cervantes shoots the gun, revealing his whereabouts. Burton and Williams escape.

== Production ==
In addition to investing his own money in the project, LeBorg "produced, casted, directed and co-scripted" the film. Gilbert Warrenton served as the cinematographer. The White Orchid was shot largely in Mexico "under difficult circumstances."

According to LeBorg, his film suffered from United Artist's concurrent production of the Mexico-themed adventure Vera Cruz (1954), starring Gary Cooper and Burt Lancaster—a $3 million investment, compared to The White Orchid's $175,000. LeBorg broke even on his project.

== Cast ==
- William Lundigan as Robert Burton
- Peggie Castle as Kathryn Williams
- Armando Silvestre as Juan Cervantes
- Rosenda Monteros as Lupita
- Jorge Treviño as Arturo
- Alejandro de Montenegro as Miguel
- Miguel A. Gallardo as Pedro
- Ramon S. Fernandez as Baytab
- Ballet Moderno de Mexico as Native Dancers
