= Show Business (1944 film) =

1944 film by Edwin L. Marin

- Theatrical release poster
- Directed by: Edwin L. Marin
- Written by: Irving Elinson (additional dialogue); Ian McLellan Hunter (uncredited); Paul Gerard Smith (uncredited); William A. Ullman Jr. (uncredited)
- Screenplay by: Joseph Quillan; Dorothy Bennett
- Story by: Bert Granet
- Starring: Eddie Cantor; George Murphy; Joan Davis; Nancy Kelly; Constance Moore
- Cinematography: Robert De Grasse
- Edited by: Theron Warth
- Music by: Leigh Harline (uncredited)
- Production company: RKO Radio Pictures
- Distributed by: RKO Radio Pictures
- Release date: May 10, 1944 (United States)
- Running time: 92 minutes
- Country: United States
- Language: English

Show Business is a 1944 American musical film starring Eddie Cantor, George Murphy, Joan Davis, Nancy Kelly and Constance Moore. The film was directed by Edwin L. Marin and released by RKO Radio Pictures.

== Plot ==
The story of a show business quartet who does their best to stay close, even when the demands of the profession separate them. George Doane is initially the most successful with his dance act. On "Amateur Night", George is intrigued by Eddie Martin (Cantor), who keeps up his act while dodging missiles from the audience. Taking Eddie to a restaurant where actors eat ("WHEN they eat", he quips), they meet a female dance duo (Joan Mason and Constance Ford) and decide to form a quartet. George has fallen for Constance but she is wary of his reputation as a "ladies man". Joan has her heart set on dragging the shy Eddie to the altar. The girl George left behind, Nancy Gae, is not in a good mood, even though the team eventually pays for an emergency surgery she needs. Constance and George eventually marry. When she is expecting a baby, Nancy offers to drive George to the hospital. Instead, she drives in the opposite direction and tries to proposition George. The car is wrecked and by the time George reaches the hospital, Constance has lost the baby. She orders George out of her life. George enlists in World War One and Constance divorces him while he is overseas. He comes back with injuries and cannot restart his career. Meanwhile, Eddie and Joan have hit the big time on Broadway and have been signed by Flo Ziegfeld. Hearing George is playing piano for free drinks in San Francisco saloons; Eddie goes there and puts on a convincing "down and out act" that has George re-joining the act to "look after him". Constance has been doing well as a solo nightclub singer, but when she sees a rejuvenated George in the show, the sparks are reignited. We end with a double wedding of George and Constance, Eddie and Joan.

== Songs ==
The hit song "It Had To be You" originated in this film. (Not true: The song was written in 1924). The rest of the score is made up of familiar Golden Oldies, including Cantor reprising his famous song "Making Whoopee".

== Cast ==
- Eddie Cantor as Eddie Martin
- George Murphy as George Doane
- Joan Davis as Joan Mason
- Nancy Kelly as Nancy Gae
- Constance Moore as Constance Ford
- Don Douglas as Charles Lucas
- Snub Pollard (Audience Member; uncredited)
- Andrew Tombes (Judge; uncredited)

== Reception ==
The film made a profit of $805,000.
