= The Queen of Babylon =

1954 Italian film

Queen of Babylon
- Directed by: Carlo Ludovico Bragaglia
- Screenplay by: Carlo Ludovico Bragaglia Ennio De Concini; Alessandro Ferraù; Cesare Ludovici; Giuseppe Mangione Nicola Manzari
- Starring: Rhonda Fleming; Ricardo Montalbán
- Cinematography: Gábor Pogány
- Music by: Renzo Rossellini
- Production companies: Panthéon Productions; Rialto
- Release date: October 28, 1954 (Italy)
- Running time: 98 minutes
- Country: Italy
- Language: Italian

The Queen of Babylon (Italian: La cortigiana di Babilonia) is a 1954 Italian peplum film set in the Neo-Babylonian Empire in the year 600 BC.

This film was directed by Carlo Ludovico Bragaglia.

== Plot ==
Semiramis, a simple keeper of goats, is taken to Babylon for having lodged Amal, the leader of the Chaldeans, pursued by King Ashur. She is noticed by the latter, who would like to make her his favorite. But the beauty has thoughts only for her attractive Amal who managed to escape and comes to visit her discreetly at the palace. Captured again, Amal escapes death thanks to Semiramis who gives in to the king, and he finds himself with his compatriots to toil in the quarries. The deceit of Sibari, the Prime Minister, will change his fate.

== Cast ==
- Rhonda Fleming as Semiramis
- Ricardo Montalbán as Amal (credited as Ricardo Montalban)
- Roldano Lupi as Assur
- Carlo Ninchi as Sibari
- Tamara Lees as Lysia
- Furio Meniconi as Bolgias
- Gildo Bocci

== See also ==
- I Am Semiramis
- War Gods of Babylon
