= Once in a Blue Moon (1935 film) =

- Directed by: Ben Hecht; Charles MacArthur
- Written by: Ben Hecht; Charles MacArthur
- Produced by: Ben Hecht; Charles MacArthur
- Starring: Jimmy Savo; Nikita Balieff; Cecilia Loftus
- Cinematography: Lee Garmes
- Music by: George Antheil
- Production company: Hecht-MacArthur Productions
- Distributed by: Paramount Pictures
- Release date: May 10, 1935
- Running time: 67 minutes
- Country: United States
- Language: English

Once in a Blue Moon is a 1935 American drama film directed by Ben Hecht and Charles MacArthur and starring Jimmy Savo, Nikita Balieff and Cecilia Loftus. It was one of four films the writing-directing team produced at the Astoria Studios in New York. It was, along with Soak the Rich, a critical and commercial disaster. Hecht and MacArthur also attempted, unsuccessfully, to avoided certification problems with the film by ignoring the Production Code Administration and sending it straight to Joseph Breen.

The film score was composed by George Antheil. who later The film was Howard da Silva's Hollywood debut. It was one of several films, along with others such as Red Salute and Tovarich, released by studios to counter the alleged red menace and according to critic John Gladchuck, Once in a Blue Moon "amplified anticommunist fear". It was one of "a dozen relatively minor anti-Russian films" released by several Hollywood studios in the years preceding World War II.

It was condemned by contemporary film critics—and has since been described as "an unmitigated disaster" and "virtually unreleasable"—and Paramount Pictures, in expectation of such a reaction, came close to not releasing it at all. In the event its release was delayed by almost two years. Hecht himself later commented that "our script for Once in a Blue Moon was a dud". When it did eventually screen, the poor exhibition previews made it difficult to find cinemas willing to show it. One Boston theatre that was forced to screen it due to its commitment to block booking did not advertise the film under its title, but listed it as "The Worst Picture Ever Made", which may in fact have improved its eventual box office.

== Plot ==
A clown is kidnapped by Bolsheviks.

== Cast ==
- Jimmy Savo as Gabbo the Great
- Nikita Balieff as Gen. Onyegin
- Cecilia Loftus as Duchess
- Whitney Bourne as Nina
- Edwina Armstrong as Princess Hena
- Sándor Szabó as Ivan
- J. Charles Gilbert as Captain
- Hans Steinke as Count Bulba
- George Mitchell as Kolla
- Jackie Boren as The General
- Michael Dalmatoff as Nikita
- George Beranger as Kolia

== Bibliography ==
- Barton, Ruth. Hedy Lamarr: The Most Beautiful Woman in Film. University Press of Kentucky, 2010.
- Fine, R., Hollywood and the Profession of Authorship, 1928-1940. UMI Research Press, 1985.
- Fyne, R. (1985). "From Hollywood to Moscow". Literature/Film Quarterly, 13(3), 194–199.
- Gladchuck, J. D., Hollywood and Anticommunism: HUAC and the Evolution of the Red Menace, 1935-1950.
- Gorbach, Julien. The Notorious Ben Hecht: Iconoclastic Writer and Militant Zionist. Purdue University Press, 2019.
- Koszarski, Richard. Hollywood on the Hudson: Film and Television in New York from Griffith to Sarnoff. Rutgers University Press, 2008.
- Magliozzi, R. S., & Turner, C. L. (2000). "Witnessing the Development of Independent Film Culture in New York: An Interview with Charles L. Turner". Film History, 12(1), 72–96.
- Manchel, F., Film Study: An Analytical Bibliography II. Fairleigh Dickinson University Press, 1990.
- Monaco, J., The Movie Guide. Putnam, 1992.
- Sligar, S. (2019). "Reserving the Kill: The Suicide Ban and Criminal Punishment in Code-Era Hollywood Film". Film History, 31(4), 1–29.
