= That's My Story (film) =

1937 American film directed by Sidney Salkow

- Directed by: Sidney Salkow
- Screenplay by: Barry Trivers
- Story by: Vee Terrys Perlman
- Produced by: Robert Presnell Sr.
- Starring: William Lundigan; Claudia Morgan; Herbert Mundin
- Cinematography: Elwood B. Bredell
- Edited by: Maurice Wright
- Music by: Charles Previn
- Production company: Universal Pictures
- Release date: October 24, 1937 (US)
- Running time: 63 minutes
- Country: United States
- Language: English

That's My Story is a 1937 American drama film directed by Sidney Salkow from a screenplay by Barry Trivers. The film stars William Lundigan, Claudia Morgan, and Herbert Mundin.

== Cast ==
- William Lundigan as Howard Fields
- Claudia Morgan as Janet Marlowe
- Herbert Mundin as Hiram
- Hobart Cavanaugh as Sheriff Otis
- Bernadene Hayes as Bonnie Rand
- Eddie Garr as Jenks
- Ralph Morgan as B. K. Carter
- Harlan Briggs as Sheriff Allen
- Edward Gargan as John
- Henry Hunter as Foster
- Charles Wilson as Cummings
- Charles Trowbridge as B. L. Martin
- Sam Hayes as Announcer
- Murray Alper as Blackie
