= Rhonda Fleming =

American actress and singer (1923–2020)

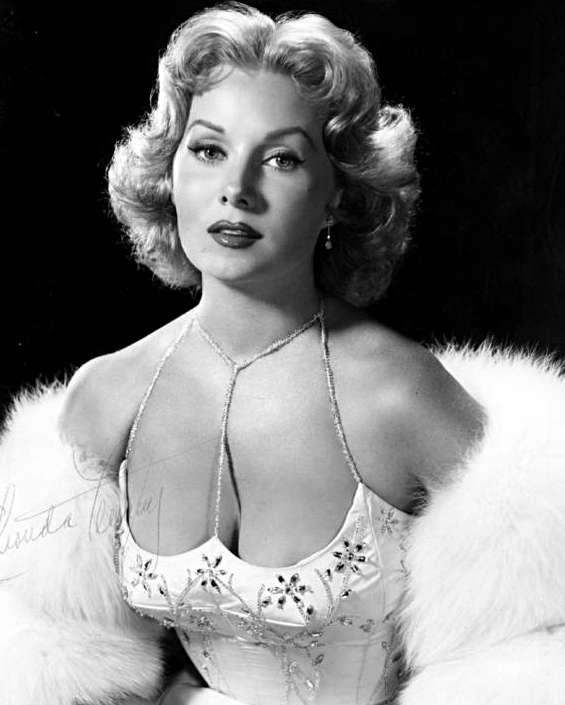
- Publicity photo, c. 1950s
- Born: Marilyn Louis; August 10, 1923; Los Angeles, California, U.S.
- Died: October 14, 2020 (aged 97); Santa Monica, California, U.S.
- Resting place: Hillside Memorial Park Cemetery, Culver City, California, U.S.
- Occupations: Actress; singer
- Years active: 1943–1991
- Political party: Republican
- Spouses: Thomas Wade Lane (m. 1940; div. 1942) Lewis V. Morrill (m. 1952; div. 1954) Lang Jeffries (m. 1960; div. 1962) Hall Bartlett (m. 1966; div. 1972) Ted Mann (m. 1977; died 2001) Darol Wayne Carlson (m. 2003; died 2017)
- Children: 1

Rhonda Fleming (born Marilyn Louis; August 10, 1923 – October 14, 2020) was an American film and television actress and singer. She acted in more than 40 films, mostly in the 1940s and 1950s, and became renowned as one of the most glamorous actresses of her day, nicknamed the "Queen of Technicolor" because she photographed so well in that medium.

== Career ==
=== Early life ===
Fleming was born Marilyn Louis in Hollywood, California to Harold Cheverton Louis, an insurance salesman, and Effie Graham, a stage actress who had appeared opposite Al Jolson in the musical Dancing Around at New York's Winter Garden Theatre from 1914 to 1915. Fleming's maternal grandfather was John C. Graham, an actor, theater owner, and newspaper editor in Utah. She was named after Marilyn Miller, who was a friend of her mother.

Fleming began working as a film actress while attending Beverly Hills High School, graduating in 1941. She was discovered by the well-known Hollywood agent Henry Willson, who changed her name from Marilyn Louis to Rhonda Fleming.

Fleming said later, "It's so weird ... He stopped me crossing the street. It kinda scared me a little bit – I was only 16 or 17. He signed me to a seven-year contract without a screen test. It was a Cinderella story, but those things could happen in those days."

=== David O. Selznick ===
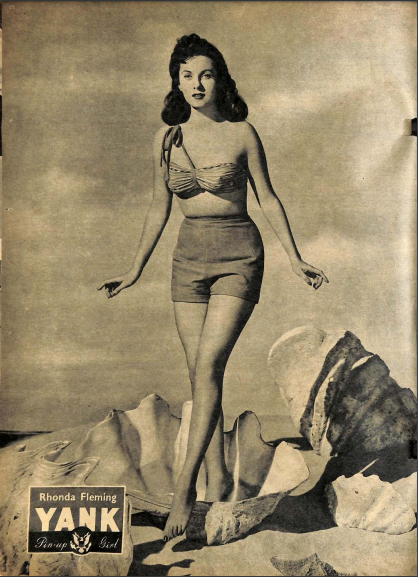
Pin-up photo of Fleming for Yank, the Army Weekly in 1944

Fleming's agent Willson went to work for David O. Selznick, who signed her to a contract. She had bit parts in In Old Oklahoma (1943), Since You Went Away (1944) for Selznick, and When Strangers Marry (1944).

Fleming received her first substantial role in the thriller Spellbound (1945), produced by Selznick and directed by Alfred Hitchcock. She later said, "Hitch told me I was going to play a nymphomaniac. I remember rushing home to look it up in the dictionary and being quite shocked." The film was a success and Selznick offered her another good role in the thriller The Spiral Staircase (1946), directed by Robert Siodmak.

Selznick lent her to appear in supporting parts in the Randolph Scott Western Abilene Town (1946) at United Artists and the film noir classic Out of the Past (1947) with Robert Mitchum and Kirk Douglas at RKO.

Fleming's first leading role came in Adventure Island (1947), a low-budget action film produced for Pine-Thomas Productions at Paramount Pictures in the two-color Cinecolor process and costarring fellow Selznick contract player Rory Calhoun.

Fleming auditioned for the female lead in the Bing Crosby film in A Connecticut Yankee in King Arthur's Court (1949), a musical loosely based on the story by Mark Twain. Fleming exhibited her singing ability, dueting with Crosby on "Once and For Always" and soloing with "When Is Sometime". They recorded the songs for a three-disc, 78-rpm Decca album conducted by Victor Young, who wrote the film's orchestral score. Fleming's vocal coach Harriet Lee praised her "lovely voice", saying, "she could be a musical comedy queen." The film was Fleming's first in Technicolor. Her fair complexion, bright red hair, and green eyes photographed exceptionally well and she was nicknamed the "Queen of Technicolor".

Fleming next starred with Bob Hope in the hit film The Great Lover (1949), which established her as a star. She later said, "After that, I wasn't fortunate enough to get good directors. I made the mistake of doing lesser films for good money. I was hot—they all wanted me—but I didn't have the guidance or background to judge for myself."

In February 1949, Selznick sold his contract players to Warner Bros., but he kept Fleming.

In 1950 Fleming portrayed John Payne's love interest in the Western film The Eagle and the Hawk.

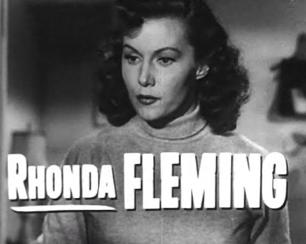
Fleming in the trailer for Cry Danger (1951)

Fleming was lent to RKO to play a femme fatale opposite Dick Powell in the film noir Cry Danger (1951). Back at Paramount, she played the title role in the Western The Redhead and the Cowboy (1951), costarring with Glenn Ford.

In 1950, she ended her association with Selznick after eight years, although five years remained in her contract with him.

=== Paramount ===
Fleming signed a three-picture deal with Paramount. Pine-Thomas cast her as Ronald Reagan's leading lady in the Western The Last Outpost (1951), John Payne's leading lady in the adventure film Crosswinds (1951) and with Reagan again in Hong Kong (1951).

Fleming was top-billed for Sam Katzman's The Golden Hawk (1952) with Sterling Hayden, then was reunited with Reagan for Tropic Zone (1953) at Pine-Thomas. In 1953, Fleming portrayed Cleopatra in Katzman's Serpent of the Nile for Columbia. That same year, she appeared with Charlton Heston in the Western Pony Express for Paramount and in two films shot in 3D, Inferno with Robert Ryan at Fox and the musical Those Redheads From Seattle with Gene Barry for Pine-Thomas. The following year, she starred with Fernando Lamas in Jivaro, her third 3D film, at Pine-Thomas. She went to Universal for Yankee Pasha (1954) with Jeff Chandler. Fleming also traveled to Italy to play Semiramis in Queen of Babylon (1954).

=== Late 1950s ===
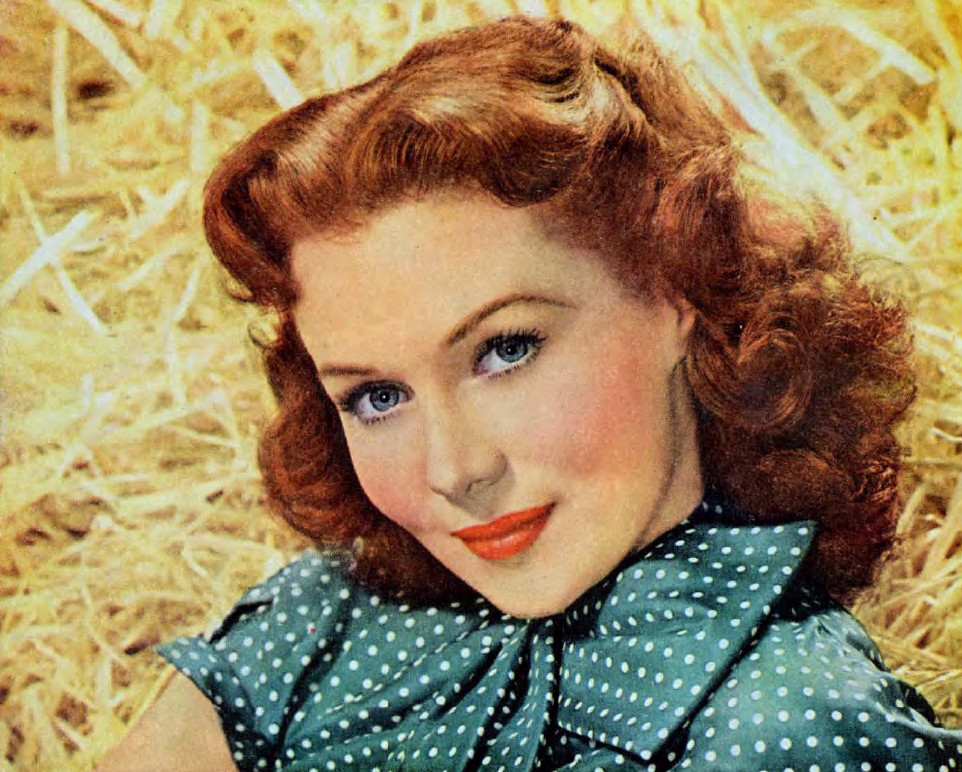
Fleming on location in 1951

Fleming was a member of a gospel singing quartet along with Jane Russell, Connie Haines and Beryl Davis.

Much of the location work for Fleming's 1955 Western Tennessee's Partner, in which she appeared with Payne and Reagan, was filmed at the Iverson Movie Ranch in Chatsworth, California. A distinctive monolithic sandstone feature behind which Fleming's character hides during an action sequence later became known as the Rhonda Fleming Rock. The rock is part of a section of the former movie ranch known as Garden of the Gods, which has been preserved as public parkland.

Fleming was reunited with Payne and fellow redhead Arlene Dahl in a noir at RKO, Slightly Scarlet (1956). She appeared in other thrillers that year: The Killer Is Loose (1956) with Joseph Cotten and Fritz Lang's While the City Sleeps (1956), costarring Dana Andrews, at RKO. Fleming was top-billed in an adventure film for Warwick Films, Odongo (1956).

Fleming played the female lead in John Sturges's hit film Gunfight at the O.K. Corral (1957), costarring Burt Lancaster and Kirk Douglas. She supported Donald O'Connor in The Buster Keaton Story (1957) and Stewart Granger in Gun Glory (1957) at MGM.

In May 1957, Fleming began performing a successful nightclub act at the Tropicana in Las Vegas. She later said, "I just wanted to know if I could get out on that stage – if I could do it. And I did! ... My heart was to do more stage work, but I had a son, so I really couldn't, but that was in my heart." She later appeared at the Hollywood Bowl in a one-woman concert.

Fleming was Guy Madison's costar in Bullwhip (1958) for Allied Artists and supported Jean Simmons in Home Before Dark (1958) in a role that she later considered her favorite.

Fleming was reunited with Bob Hope in Alias Jesse James (1959) and appeared on an episode of Wagon Train. She appeared in the Irwin Allen/Joseph M. Newman production of The Big Circus (1959), costarring Victor Mature and Vincent Price, for Allied Artists, whom Fleming later sued for unpaid profits.

Fleming traveled to Italy again to film The Revolt of the Slaves (1959) and was second-billed in The Crowded Sky (1960).

=== Semiretirement ===
In 1960, Fleming described herself as "semi-retired," having earned money through real-estate investments. That year, she toured her nightclub act in Las Vegas and Palm Springs.

=== Television ===
During the 1950s, 1960s and into the 1970s, Fleming frequently appeared on television with guest-starring roles on The Red Skelton Show, The Best of Broadway, The Investigators, Shower of Stars, The Dick Powell Show, Wagon Train, Burke's Law, The Virginian, McMillan & Wife, Police Woman, Kung Fu, Ellery Queen and The Love Boat.

On September 30, 1951, Fleming sang live on NBC's Colgate Comedy Hour, broadcast from the El Capitan Theater in Hollywood.

In 1958, Fleming recorded her only LP, entitled Rhonda. For the album, which was released by Columbia Records, she blended current songs such as "Around the World" with standards such as "Love Me or Leave Me" and "I've Got You Under My Skin". Conductor-arranger Frank Comstock provided the musical direction.

On March 4, 1962, Fleming appeared in one of the final segments of ABC's Follow the Sun in a role opposite Gary Lockwood. She played a Marine in the episode titled "Marine of the Month".

In December 1962, Fleming was cast as the glamorous Kitty Bolton in the episode "Loss of Faith" of the syndicated anthology series Death Valley Days, hosted by Stanley Andrews.

=== Later career ===
In the 1960s, Fleming became involved with other businesses and began performing regularly on stage and in Las Vegas.

One of her final film roles was a bit part as Edith von Secondburg in the comedy The Nude Bomb (1980) starring Don Adams. Her final film appearance was in the TV movie Waiting for the Wind (1991) with Robert Mitchum and Jameson Parker.

Fleming has a star on the Hollywood Walk of Fame. In 2007, a Golden Palm Star on the Palm Springs Walk of Stars was dedicated to her.

== Personal life and death ==
Fleming worked for several charities and was a supporter of numerous organizations fighting cancer, homelessness, and child abuse, and served on the committees of many related organizations. For example, in 1991, with her fifth husband Ted Mann, she established the Rhonda Fleming Mann Clinic for Women's Comprehensive Care, and the Rhonda Fleming Mann Resource Center for Women with Cancer, at the UCLA Medical Center, in 1988, she was a founding member of STOP CANCER, a non-profit funding initiative for cancer research and prevention, was an ambassador for Childhelp, committed to the treatment of victims of child abuse, established two Rhonda Fleming Family Centers for P.A.T.H. (People Assisting the Homeless), supported the Providence Saint John’s Health Center, and established The Rhonda Fleming Mann Research Fellowship at the City of Hope Hospital, a National Cancer Institute Designated Cancer Center. Further, she supported the ARCS Foundation (Achievement Rewards for College Scientists), was a Life Associate of Pepperdine University, supported the Alzheimer's Research Foundation in France (Fondation Recherche Alzheimer), was a lifetime member of the Freedoms Foundation, was a benefactor of the Los Angeles Music Center, was a trustee board member of World Opportunities International (WOI) (a faith-based religious and broadcast ministry), and a trustee of The UCLA Foundation.

In 1964, Fleming spoke at the Project Prayer rally attended by 2,500 at the Shrine Auditorium in Los Angeles. The gathering, which was hosted by Anthony Eisley, a star of ABC's Hawaiian Eye series, sought to flood the United States Congress with letters in support of mandatory school prayer following two United States Supreme Court decisions in 1962 and 1963 that invalidated the practice. Joining Fleming and Eisley at the rally were Walter Brennan, Lloyd Nolan, Dale Evans, Pat Boone and Gloria Swanson. Fleming declared, "Project Prayer is hoping to clarify the First Amendment to the Constitution and reverse this present trend away from God." Eisley and Fleming added that John Wayne, Ronald Reagan, Roy Rogers, Mary Pickford, Jane Russell, Ginger Rogers and Pat Buttram would also have attended the rally had their schedules not been in conflict.

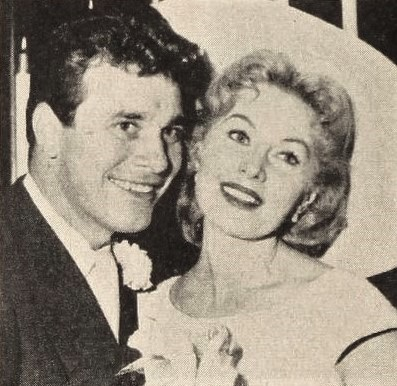
Fleming with her third husband Lang Jeffries in 1960

Fleming married six times:

- Thomas Wade Lane, interior decorator, (1940–1942; divorced), one son
- Lewis V. Morrill, Hollywood physician, (July 11, 1952 – 1954; divorced)
- Lang Jeffries, actor, (April 3, 1960 – January 11, 1962; divorced)
- Hall Bartlett, producer, (March 27, 1966 – 1972; divorced)
- Ted Mann, theater owner and producer, (March 11, 1977 – January 15, 2001; his death)
- Darol Wayne Carlson, businessman, (2003 – October 31, 2017; his death)

Through her son, Fleming had two granddaughters, four great-grandchildren, and two great-great-grandchildren.

Fleming was a Presbyterian. She was interred in the plot of her fifth husband, Ted Mann, at the Jewish Hillside Memorial Park Cemetery in Culver City, California, upon her death. Her obituary mentioned that she had been a "faithful and devoted Christian".

Fleming was a member of the Republican Party, was a lifelong activist in the party, and was good friends with Ronald Reagan since working with him in the 1950s.

In 1995, she was honored with the Women's International Center Living Legacy Award, and on the 100th anniversary of Fleming's birth, Turner Classic Movies honored her on Summer Under the Stars, programming a 24-hour block of her films. It was Fleming's first time on the lineup.

Fleming died on October 14, 2020, due to complications from aspiration pneumonia at Saint John's Health Center, Santa Monica at the age of 97.

== Filmography ==
Year	Title	Role	Notes
1943	In Old Oklahoma	Dance-hall girl	Uncredited
1944	Since You Went Away	Girl at dance	Uncredited
1944	When Strangers Marry	Girl on train	
1945	Spellbound	Mary Carmichael	
1946	Abilene Town	Sherry Balder	
1946	The Spiral Staircase	Blanche	
1947	Adventure Island	Faith Wishart	
1947	Out of the Past	Meta Carson	
1949	A Connecticut Yankee in King Arthur's Court	Alisande La Carteloise	
1949	The Great Lover	Duchess Alexandria	
1950	The Eagle and the Hawk	Mrs. Madeline Danzeeger	
1951	Cry Danger	Nancy Morgan	
1951	The Redhead and the Cowboy	Candace Bronson	
1951	The Last Outpost	Julie McQuade	Re-released in 1962 titled Cavalry Charge
1951	Little Egypt	Izora	
1951	Crosswinds	Katherine Shelley	
1952	Hong Kong	Victoria Evans	
1952	The Golden Hawk	Captain Rouge	
1953	Tropic Zone	Flanders White	
1953	Serpent of the Nile	Cleopatra	
1953	Pony Express	Evelyn Hastings	
1953	Inferno	Geraldine Carson	
1953	Those Redheads From Seattle	Kathie Edmonds	
1954	Jivaro	Alice Parker	
1954	Yankee Pasha	Roxana Reil	
1955	Queen of Babylon	Semiramis	
1955	Tennessee's Partner	Elizabeth "Duchess" Farnham	
1956	The Killer Is Loose	Lila Wagner	
1956	Slightly Scarlet	June Lyons	
1956	While the City Sleeps	Dorothy Kyne	
1956	Odongo	Pamela Muir	
1957	The Buster Keaton Story	Peggy Courtney	
1957	Gunfight at the O.K. Corral	Laura Denbow	
1957	Gun Glory	Jo	
1958	Bullwhip	Cheyenne O'Malley	
1958	Home Before Dark	Joan Carlisle	
1959	Alias Jesse James	Cora Lee Collins	
1959	The Big Circus	Helen Harrison	
1960	The Crowded Sky	Cheryl "Charro" Heath	
1960	The Revolt of the Slaves	Fabiola	
1964	The Patsy	Herself	
1964	Pão de Açúcar	Pamela Jones DeSantis	
1965	Run for Your Wife	Nyta	
1976	Won Ton Ton, the Dog Who Saved Hollywood	Herself	
1980	The Nude Bomb	Edith Von Secondberg	
1991	Waiting for the Wind	Hannah	TV Movie with Robert Mitchum and Jameson Parker (final film role)

== Television ==
Year	Series title	Role	Episode title	Ref
1952	Colgate Comedy Hour	guest with Abbott and Costello and Errol Flynn		
1955	What's My Line?	celebrity mystery guest		
1955	The Red Skelton Show	Phyllis	"Freddy's Romance"	
1958	Wagon Train	Jennifer Churchill	"The Jennifer Churchill Story"	
1961	Wagon Train	Patience Miller	"The Patience Miller Story"	
1961	Here's Hollywood	celebrity guest with third husband, Lang Jeffries		
1961	The Dick Powell Show	Margo Haley	"John J. Diggs"	
1963	Wagon Train	Sandra Cummings	"The Sandra Cummings Story"	
1964	The Virginian	guest star	"We've Lost a Train"	
1964	Bob Hope Presents the Chrysler Theatre	Purity	"Have Girls, Will Travel"	
1973	Needles and Pins	guest star	"It W a Very Good Line"	
1974	McMillan and Wife	guest star	"Cross and Double-cross"	
1975	Kung Fu	Jennie Malone	"Ambush"	
1978	The Love Boat	celebrity guest		

== Radio appearances ==
Date	Program	Episode	Ref
March 22, 1951	Screen Directors Playhouse	"The Great Lover"	

== Theater ==
Dates	Title	Role	Theater	Ref
April 25, 1973 - June 17, 1973	The Women	Miriam Aarons	Broadway: 46th Street Theatre now Richard Rodgers Theatre	
Summer 1975	The Boy Friend	Madame Dubonnet	Touring including at Packard Music Hall and Memorial Hall, Ohio	
