= The Lady Fights Back =

1937 film

- Theatrical release poster
- Directed by: Milton Carruth
- Screenplay by: Brown Holmes; Robert T. Shannon
- Based on: Heather of the High Hand; 1937 novel by Arthur Stringer
- Produced by: Edmund Grainger
- Starring: Kent Taylor; Irene Hervey; William Lundigan; Willie Best; Joe Sawyer; Paul Hurst
- Cinematography: Milton Krasner
- Edited by: Paul Landres
- Music by: Charles Previn
- Production company: Universal Pictures
- Distributed by: Universal Pictures
- Release date: October 1, 1937
- Running time: 61 minutes
- Country: United States
- Language: English

The Lady Fights Back is a 1937 American action film directed by Milton Carruth and written by Brown Holmes and Robert T. Shannon. It is based on the 1937 novel Heather of the High Hand by Arthur Stringer. The film stars Kent Taylor, Irene Hervey, William Lundigan, Willie Best, Joe Sawyer, and Paul Hurst. The film was released on October 1, 1937, by Universal Pictures.

== Plot ==
The plot follows Power company worker Owen Merrill as goes into Muskalala River to make surveys for a dam site, when the head of Muskalala Salmon Club Heather McHale finds out about his intentions, she decides to stop him from building the dam.

== Cast ==
- Kent Taylor as Owen Merrill
- Irene Hervey as Heather McHale
- William Lundigan as Doug McKenzie
- Willie Best as McTavish
- Joe Sawyer as Swede Jannsen
- Paul Hurst as Maloney
- Chick Chandler as Steve Crowder
- Ernest Cossart as Commissioner Allan
- Si Jenks as Villager with Automobile
- Gerald Oliver Smith as Sir Daniel McAndrews
