= A Shot in the Dark (1941 film) =

1941 film by William C. McGann

- Theatrical release poster
- Directed by: William C. McGann
- Screenplay by: M. Coates Webster
- Based on: No Hard Feelings; 1938 story in Black Mask by Frederick Nebel
- Produced by: Bryan Foy
- Starring: William Lundigan; Nan Wynn; Ricardo Cortez; Regis Toomey
- Cinematography: James Van Trees
- Edited by: Harold McLernon
- Music by: William Lava
- Production company: Warner Bros. Pictures
- Distributed by: Warner Bros. Pictures
- Release date: April 5, 1941
- Running time: 57 minutes
- Country: United States
- Language: English

A Shot in the Dark is a 1941 American comedy mystery film directed by William C. McGann and starring William Lundigan, Nan Wynn and Ricardo Cortez. It was released by Warner Bros. Pictures on April 5, 1941. The film was based on the short story "No Hard Feelings" by Frederick Nebel in the Black Mask magazine. The movie is also a remake of the Torchy Blane film Smart Blonde (1937).

== Plot ==
Nightclub owner Philip Richards announced that he will marry Helen Armstrong and is selling his business to George Kilpatrick. A local racketeer, Schaffer, wants to know why Philip refused his higher offer and makes a threat against George Kilpatrick. Philip's ex-girlfriend Clare Winters try to stop him from selling the club and hold a gun on him, which he takes away and puts in his safe. A reporter, Peter Kennedy who is in love with the club's singer Dixie Waye meets George Kilpatrick at the airport, who on his way to the taxi is shot and killed.

Peter's rival for Dixie's affections, lieutenant William Ryder question Philip about George Kilpatrick's murder. At Philip's apartment, William is introduced to Philip's fiancée Helen and her brother Roger. Waiting at Clare's, Peter finds out that Clare is missing. Later, William and Peter learn that Roger has been attacked in his apartment, and the attacker left behind a handkerchief with the initials "A. M". Peter thinks it might belong to Philip's right-hand man, Al Martin who recently left town. Clare's body is later found, along with the gun that Philip took away from her. The elevator boy reveals that he saw a man matching Philip's description on the same floor where Clare's room is.

William arrests Philip who confesses to the murder but pulls a gun and escapes. William thinks he is protecting someone else and didn't really kill Clare. Dixie accepts a date with Roger and a photographer snap a picture of them together. In a jealous rage, Helen fires Dixie and Peter takes her jealousy that she's not really Roger's sister. William and Peter questions them and Helen confesses that she killed Clare in self-defense when Clare threatened her life. William learns over the telephone that Clare is George Kilpatrick's ex-wife. He later confronts Helen, and Philip who has been hiding in her home comes out. Helen and Roger escape in the confusion. After a chase, they are captured and confess to both murders. William tells Peter that Al and Clare wanted to break Philip's engagement and that Philip was trying to take the blame for Clare's murder to protect Helen. Afterward, they both approach Dixie for a date, but she leaves with a naval officer.

== Cast ==
- William Lundigan as Peter Kennedy
- Nan Wynn as Dixie Waye
- Ricardo Cortez as Philip Richards
- Regis Toomey as William Ryder
- Maris Wrixon as Helen Armstrong
- Lucia Carroll as Clare Winters
- Don Douglas as Roger Armstrong
- Noel Madison as Al Martin
- Emory Parnell as Marsotti

== Songs ==
- For You – music by Joe Burke and lyrics by Al Dubin.
- I'm Just Wild About Harry – music by Eubie Blake and lyrics by Noble Sissle.
- It Just Happened – music by Jimmy McHugh and lyrics by Ralph Freed.

== Bibliography ==
- Fetrow, Alan G. Feature Films, 1940-1949: a United States Filmography. McFarland, 1994.
