= State Department: File 649 =

1949 film by Sam Newfield

- Directed by: Sam Newfield (as Peter Stewart)
- Written by: Milton Raison
- Produced by: Sigmund Neufeld
- Starring: William Lundigan; Virginia Bruce; Jonathan Hale
- Cinematography: Jack Greenhalgh
- Edited by: Holbrook N. Todd
- Music by: Lucien Cailliet
- Distributed by: Film Classics, Inc
- Release date: 11 February 1949
- Running time: 87 minutes
- Country: United States
- Language: English
- Budget: $750,000

State Department: File 649 is a 1949 American Cinecolor film noir directed by Sam Newfield (as "Peter Stewart") and starring William Lundigan, Virginia Bruce and Jonathan Hale. The film is also known as Assignment in China in the United Kingdom.

== Plot ==
Kenneth Seeley, a member of the U. S. State Department's Foreign Service Bureau, and Marge Weldon, a morale worker with the bureau, are assigned to an area in Mongolia dominated by an outlaw warlord. The latter captures the village where they reside and they'll have to make a plan to escape.

== Cast ==
- William Lundigan as Kenneth R. Seeley
- Virginia Bruce as Margaret 'Marge' Weldon
- Jonathan Hale as Director General of Foreign Service
- Frank Ferguson as Consul-General Reither
- Richard Loo as Marshal Yun Usu
- Philip Ahn as Col. Aram
- Raymond Bond as Consul Howard Brown
- Milton Kibbee as Bill Sneed, white trader
- Victor Sen Yung as Johnny Hon, houseboy
- Lora Lee Michel as Jessica Morse
- John Holland as Wilfred Ballinger
- Harlan Warde as Rev. Dr. Morse
- Carole Donne as Mrs. Sarah Morse
- Barbara Woodell as Carrie Willoughby, pianist
- Lee Bennett as Agent Don Logan
- Robert Stevenson as Mongolian Spy
- H.T. Tsiang as Mayor Wan-too
- Joseph Crehan as Junior Official
- Ray Bennett as Fur Trader
- Nana Bryant as Mrs. Peggy Brown

== Production ==
Filming started 15 September at Nassour Studios.
