= Scott Corbett =

American novelist and educator

W. Scott Corbett
- Born: July 27, 1913; Kansas City, Missouri, U.S.
- Died: March 6, 2006 (aged 92); Providence, Rhode Island, U.S.
- Occupation: Writer
- Writing career
- Period: 1950–1985
- Genres: Novels, mystery fiction, speculative fiction
- Subject: Mechanical processes for beginning readers

W. Scott Corbett (July 27, 1913 – March 6, 2006) was an American novelist and educator. Beginning in 1950 he wrote five adult novels, then began writing books for children. He retired from teaching in 1965 to write full-time. His best-known book is The Lemonade Trick, a novel for children. One of his books, entitled The Reluctant Landlord (1950), was made into the 1951 film Love Nest. He wrote his first children's book, Susie Sneakers, in 1956. According to a Providence Journal obituary, he wrote 81 books, "including 34 that he aimed at children". According to the de Grummond Children's Literature Collection, which holds his papers, he wrote "at least sixty-seven fiction and non-fiction books for children".

Corbett received a bachelor of journalism degree from the University of Missouri in 1934. During World War II he was a member of the 42nd Infantry Division of the United States Army. In this position, he also served as a correspondent for Stars and Stripes, the United States's military newspaper in Europe, and also served as the last editor of Yank, the Army Weekly, an Army magazine based in Paris. He was one of the first correspondents to enter the Dachau concentration camp in Germany just before the end of the war.

Corbett moved with his wife to Providence, Rhode Island, in 1957, and, in addition to his writing, taught at the Moses Brown School. He died at his home in Providence at the age of ninety-two. He was a member of the Rhode Island Heritage Hall of Fame. His novel Cutlass Island won the Edgar Allan Poe award in 1962 from the Mystery Writers of America as the best mystery written for children. In 1976, The Home Run Trick won the Mark Twain Award, an honor voted by the schoolchildren of Missouri. Many of Corbett's books were written while at sea, as he and his wife traveled extensively via freighter.

== Works ==
=== Fiction ===
- Susie Sneakers (1956)
- Tree House Island (1959)
- Dead Man's Light (1960)
- Cutlass Island (1962)
- Danger Point: The Wreck of the Birkenhead (1962)
- The Cave Above Delphi (1965)
- One By Sea (1965)
- Pippa Passes (1966)
- Diamonds are Trouble (1967)
- Cop's Kid (1968)
- Diamonds are More Trouble (1969)
- Ever Ride a Dinosaur? (1969)
- The Baseball Bargain (1970)
- The Mystery Man (1970)
- Steady, Freddie! (1970)
- The Big Joke Game (1972)
- Dead Before Docking (1972)
- The Red Room Riddle (1972)
- Dr. Merlin's Magic Shop (1973)
- Run for the Money (1973)
- The Great Custard Pie Panic (1974)
- Here Lies the Body (1974)
- Take a Number (1974)
- The Boy Who Walked on Air (1975)
- Captain Butcher's Body (1976)
- The Hockey Girls (1976)
- The Discontented Ghost (1978)
- The Foolish Dinosaur Fiasco (1978)
- The Donkey Planet (1979)
- The Mysterious Zetabet (1979)
- Jokes to Read in the Dark (1980)
- The Deadly Hoax (1981)
- Grave Doubts (1982)
- Down With Wimps! (1984)
- Jokes to Tell Your Worst Enemy (1984)
- Witch Hunt (1985)

The Trick series

- The Lemonade Trick (1960)
- The Mailbox Trick (1961)
- The Disappearing Dog Trick (1963)
- The Limerick Trick (1964)
- The Baseball Trick (1965)
- The Turnabout Trick (1967)
- The Hairy Horror Trick (1969)
- The Hateful Plateful Trick (1971)
- The Home Run Trick (1973)
- The Hockey Trick (1974)
- The Black Mask Trick (1976)
- The Hangman's Ghost Trick (1977)

Inspector Tearle series

- The Case of the Gone Goose (1966)
- The Case of the Fugitive Firebug (1969)
- The Case of the Ticklish Tooth (1971)
- The Case of the Silver Skull (1974)
- The Case of the Burgled Blessing Box (1975)

The Great McGoniggle Series

- The Great McGoniggle's Gray Ghost (1975)
- The Great McGoniggle's Key Play (1976)
- The Great McGoniggle Rides Shotgun (1977)
- The Great McGoniggle Switches Pitches (1980)

=== Academic and other works ===
- States of the Nation: Rhode Island (1969)
- What About the Wankel Engine? (1974)
- Bridges (1978)
- Home Computers: A Simple and Informative Guide (1980)

What Makes... series

- What Makes a Car Go? (1963)
- What Makes T.V. Work? (1965)
- What Makes a Light Go On? (1966)
- What Makes a Plane Fly? (1967)
- What Makes a Boat Float? (1970)

== Awards ==
- Edgar Allan Poe Award for Best Juvenile (1963) for Cutlass Island (1962)
- Mark Twain Readers Award (1976) for The Home Run Trick (1973)
