= Atlantic City (1944 film) =

1944 film by Ray McCarey

- Original theatrical poster
- Directed by: Ray McCarey
- Screenplay by: Doris Gilbert; Frank Gill Jr. George Carleton Brown
- Story by: Arthur Caesar
- Produced by: Albert J. Cohen
- Starring: Constance Moore; Brad Taylor; Charley Grapewin
- Cinematography: John Alton
- Edited by: Richard L. Van Enger
- Music by: Joseph Dubin; Walter Scharf
- Production company: Republic Pictures
- Distributed by: Republic Pictures
- Release date: September 15, 1944 (United States)
- Running time: 87 minutes
- Country: United States
- Language: English
- Budget: $1 million

Atlantic City is a 1944 American musical romance film directed by Ray McCarey and starring Constance Moore. The film concerns the formative years of Atlantic City, New Jersey. Vaudeville acts are re-created in the story of how Atlantic City became a famous resort. The supporting cast features Louis Armstrong and Dorothy Dandridge. The film was reissued in 1950 under the title Atlantic City Honeymoon.

It was the most expensive film in Republic's history.

== Plot ==
In 1915, Atlantic City is a sleepy seaside resort, but Brad Taylor, son of a small hotel and vaudeville house proprietor, has big plans: he thinks it can be "the playground of the world." Brad's wheeling and dealing proves remarkably successful in attracting big enterprises and big shows, but brings him little success in personal relationships.

== Cast ==
- Constance Moore as Marilyn Whitaker
- Brad Taylor (Stanley Brown) as Bradley Taylor
- Charley Grapewin as Jake Taylor
- Paul Whiteman as himself
- Louis Armstrong as himself
- Robert B. Castaine as Carter Graham
- Dorothy Dandridge as Singer
- Adele Mara as Barmaid
- Ford L. Buck as himself
- John W. Bubbles as himself
- Gus Van as himself
- Mildred Kornman as schoolgirl (uncredited)

Stanley Brown, playing a character named Brad Taylor, is listed in the opening credits as Brad Taylor, and continued to use this name in all subsequent films.

== See also ==
- List of American films of 1944
