= West Bound Limited =

1937 American action film directed by Ford Beebe

- Theatrical release poster
- Directed by: Ford Beebe
- Screenplay by: Maurice Geraghty
- Story by: Ford Beebe
- Produced by: Ben Koenig; Henry MacRae
- Starring: Lyle Talbot; Polly Rowles; Frank Reicher; Henry Brandon; Henry Hunter; William Lundigan
- Cinematography: Jerome Ash; Elwood Bredell
- Edited by: Philip Cahn
- Production company: Universal Pictures
- Distributed by: Universal Pictures
- Release date: July 11, 1937
- Running time: 76 minutes
- Country: United States
- Language: English

West Bound Limited is a 1937 American action film directed by Ford Beebe and starring Lyle Talbot, Polly Rowles, Frank Reicher, Henry Brandon, Henry Hunter and William Lundigan. Written by Maurice Geraghty, the film was released on July 11, 1937, by Universal Pictures. The film was recorded at various locations along the South Pacific Coast Railroad in Santa Cruz County, California.

== Plot ==
Night-dispatcher Dave Tolliver is found guilty of negligence after not changing the tracks for a passenger train, when trying to stop a masked robber, he later escapes prison and goes cover for a dispatcher that has fallen ill, then he founds out that the robber works in that station.

== Cast ==
- Lyle Talbot as Dave Tolliver aka Bob Kirk
- Polly Rowles as Janet Martin
- Frank Reicher as Pop Martin
- Henry Brandon as Joe Forbes
- Henry Hunter as Howard
- William Lundigan as Dispatcher
