= Jimmy Savo =

American actor (1892–1960)

- Savo in 1926
- Born: Vincenzo Rocco Sava or James Vincent Sava; July 31, 1892; New York City, U.S.
- Died: September 3, 1960 (aged 68); Guardea, Terni, Italy
- Occupations: Comic entertainer, actor

Jimmy Savo (born James Vincent Sava or Vincenzo Rocco Sava; July 31, 1892 – September 3, 1960) was an American vaudeville, Broadway, nightclub, film and television performer, comedian, juggler, and mime artist.

== Early life ==
Jimmy Savo was born in New York City in 1892, the son of Giuseppe Sava, a shoemaker, and his wife Carmela (née Baione), who were immigrants to the United States from the village of Stigliano, in southern Italy. He grew up in poor areas of Manhattan and then the Bronx, and first became noted as a juggler in amateur contests. By the age of twelve, he was billed as "The Child Wonder Juggler" on vaudeville bills.

== Career ==
He made his first professional appearance at Hammerstein's Victoria Theatre in 1912. Over the years, he added such skills as rope walking, singing, dancing, and joke telling to his act, and performed in burlesque shows as well as vaudeville. By 1918, he had become a headlining act. He made his debut on Broadway in 1924, appearing with Fred Allen, and made many Broadway appearances over the following decade, co-starring in Earl Carroll's Vanities of 1930. In 1938, he originated the role of "Dromio of Syracuse" in The Boys from Syracuse, and in 1940 he starred in a one-man revue, Mum's the Word, at the Belmont Theatre.

He appeared in several movies, the first being the 1928 Canadian-made drama Carry on, Sergeant!. He also starred in Once in a Blue Moon (1935) written by Ben Hecht and Charles MacArthur. The film was not a success, costing Paramount Pictures $350,000. His final movie appearances were in Reckless Living and Merry-Go-Round of 1938.

In 1942 Isidore Herk and the Shubert brothers co-produced a Broadway show called Wine, Women and Song, starring Jimmy Savo and Margie Hart. The show was advertised as a combination of vaudeville, burlesque and Broadway revue, and ran for seven weeks. The revue included striptease, which shocked some of the audiences. Wine, Women and Song was closed by court order in December 1942. Savo also featured in the 1943 Broadway musical by Lerner and Loewe, What's Up?.

After he underwent a leg amputation in 1946, Savo continued to perform in nightclub settings, notably at the Plaza Hotel in New York. In 1950 he had his own television program, The Jimmy Savo Show on NBC.

Savo was the author of two books: the children's book Little World, Hello! (1947), and the posthumously published memoir I Bow to the Stones: Memories of a New York Childhood (1963).

== Personal life ==
He married the actress Frances Victoria Browder (1896–1962) in 1918; they divorced in 1935. His second wife, Lina Farina (1902–1988), was an Italian-American journalist.

He died in Guardea, Terni, Italy in 1960, at the age of 68, while on vacation visiting some of his wife's family's properties.
