= East of the River =

- Theatrical release poster
- Directed by: Alfred E. Green
- Screenplay by: Fred Niblo, Jr.
- Story by: John Fante; Ross B. Wills
- Produced by: Jack L. Warner
- Starring: John Garfield; Brenda Marshall; Marjorie Rambeau; George Tobias; William Lundigan; Moroni Olsen
- Cinematography: Sidney Hickox
- Edited by: Thomas Pratt
- Music by: Adolph Deutsch
- Production company: Warner Bros. Pictures
- Distributed by: Warner Bros. Pictures
- Release date: November 9, 1940
- Running time: 74 minutes
- Country: United States
- Language: English

East of the River is a 1940 American drama film directed by Alfred E. Green and written by Fred Niblo, Jr. The film stars John Garfield, Brenda Marshall, Marjorie Rambeau, George Tobias, William Lundigan and Moroni Olsen. The film was released by Warner Bros. Pictures on November 9, 1940.

== Plot ==
Mama Teresa runs a small New York cafe. She keeps son Joe Lorenzo out of reform school and adopts his hopeless, homeless pal Nick, hoping they'll stay out of trouble.

Joe's life of crime pays for Nick's education. He pretends to be out west running a ranch, but Joe is actually doing time in San Quentin prison for his crimes. He gets out and returns to New York with his girl, Laurie Romayne, a convicted forger, to see Nick graduate from college.

Laurie is drawn to Mama's wholesome way of life and also falls for Nick. Joe has come to New York City looking for trouble, and finds it. He hunts up Scarfi and Turner, who he insists framed him into San Quentin. Pretending to let bygones be bygones, Joe convinces them to give him a $15,000.00 advance to join on an important safe-cracking job. Joe then anonymously tips the police.

The night of the job, Joe makes his escape in the dark. Scarfi panics and kills a police officer, for which he is eventually electrocuted. When Joe hears Turner has escaped, he realizes he is on the spot. He makes excuses and leaves New York City.

Joe gets wind of Laurie and Nick's upcoming wedding while hiding out in Tijuana, Mexico. Returning to New York, Joe plays the good sport at a lavish pre-wedding party. But when alone with Laurie he threatens to reveal her prison record to Nick unless she calls off the wedding and comes back to him. Overhearing this, Mama Lorenzo confronts Joe, revealing that she has always known that he was in the penitentiary, delivering a blistering denunciation of Joe as a bad seed she wishes had never been born.

Shamed, Joe goes to Laurie's room to apologize---only to find her being held captive by Turner and his men. Joe says they can do whatever they want with him, if they agree to drop Laurie at the church en route to taking him for a one-way ride. Turner agrees.

When they arrive at the crowded church, Joe escapes his captors long enough to assault a police officer. Turner doesn't dare try to grab Joe back, and makes a hasty retreat. As Joe is taken away to the safety of jail, he happily waves goodbye to the wedding party.

== Cast ==
- John Garfield as Joseph Enrico 'Joe' Lorenzo
- Brenda Marshall as Laurie Romayne
- Marjorie Rambeau as Mama Teresa Lorenzo
- George Tobias as Tony Scaduto
- William Lundigan as Nicholas Antonio 'Nick' Lorenzo
- Moroni Olsen as Judge R.D. Davis
- Douglas Fowley as Cy Turner
- Jack La Rue as Frank 'Frisco' Scarfi
- Frank Faylen as bus tour guide
- Jack Carr as 'No Neck' Griswold
- Paul Guilfoyle as Balmy
- Russell Hicks as Warden
- Charley Foy as Customer
- Ralph Volkie as Smith, Turner's Henchman
- Jimmy O'Gatty as Turner's Henchman
- Robert Homans as Patrolman Shanahan
- Joe Conti as Joe (as a boy)
- O'Neill Nolan as Nick (as a boy)
