= Home Before Dark (film) =

1958 film by Mervyn LeRoy

- Theatrical release poster
- Directed by: Mervyn LeRoy
- Screenplay by: Eileen Bassing; Robert Bassing
- Based on: Home Before Dark; 1957 novel by Eileen Bassing
- Produced by: Mervyn LeRoy
- Starring: Jean Simmons; Dan O'Herlihy; Rhonda Fleming; Efrem Zimbalist Jr.
- Cinematography: Joseph F. Biroc
- Edited by: Philip W. Anderson
- Music by: Ray Heindorf
- Distributed by: Warner Bros. Pictures
- Release date: November 16, 1958
- Running time: 136 minutes
- Country: United States
- Language: English
- Budget: $1.4 million
- Box office: $1.9 million (US/Canada rentals)

Home Before Dark is a 1958 American drama film directed and produced by Mervyn LeRoy and starring Jean Simmons, Dan O'Herlihy, Rhonda Fleming, and Efrem Zimbalist Jr. The screenplay was written by Eileen and Robert Bassing, based on the novel by Eileen Bassing. The title song was written by Sammy Cahn with music by Jimmy McHugh.

The film, and Simmons' performance in particular, attracted positive critical comment. Pauline Kael of the New Yorker wrote, "Jean Simmons gives a reserved, beautifully modulated performance," and film critic Philip French believed it contained "perhaps her finest performance."

== Plot ==
After a year inside a Massachusetts state mental hospital, Charlotte Bronn, with hair dyed platinum blonde, leaves to resume life with her professor husband, Arnold Bronn. Dr. Collins worries Charlotte will be among the many patients who relapse when they return to the same situations that caused their problems. Charlotte's stepmother, Inez, and stepsister, Joan, live with Charlotte and her husband in the house wealthy Charlotte owns. Though she has no memory of it, Charlotte was told that she attacked Joan in a fit of jealousy. A stranger also now lives in the house, a boarder, Dr. Jake Diamond, on temporary assignment at the college where Arnold teaches. Arnold offered hospitality to Jake to please the soon-to-retire department head, whose job Arnold wants. An irascible cook, Mattie, completes the household. Arnold sees no reason to change things because of Charlotte’s return.

At breakfast, Inez bosses Charlotte, issuing commands about everything from the food she eats to a new wardrobe. Arnold has been sleeping on the couch in his library. When Charlotte begs him to come back to their room, he lies, telling her that Dr. Collins says she should stay alone for a while. Charlotte struggles to adjust, but expresses she "can't get well in a vacuum". Arnold observes that she has changed since they married.

A flashback to a student-faculty dance reveals Charlotte as a brunette. Hamilton “Ham” Gregory, who loves her, declares she has not been acting like herself for weeks. She has been emulating her sister’s big personality and habit of calling everybody "Ducky". Charlotte predicts that Arnold, who likes her new personality, will propose to her before the party ends.

When Arnold tells Charlotte he is attracted by her youth, quick mind, gaiety, and free spirit, Charlotte demurs that she is none of those things. Arnold confides that he does not know how to show emotion, unable to remember crying, even as a child. Confessing that he is jealous seeing her with Ham, Arnold tries to express that he loves her and kisses her.

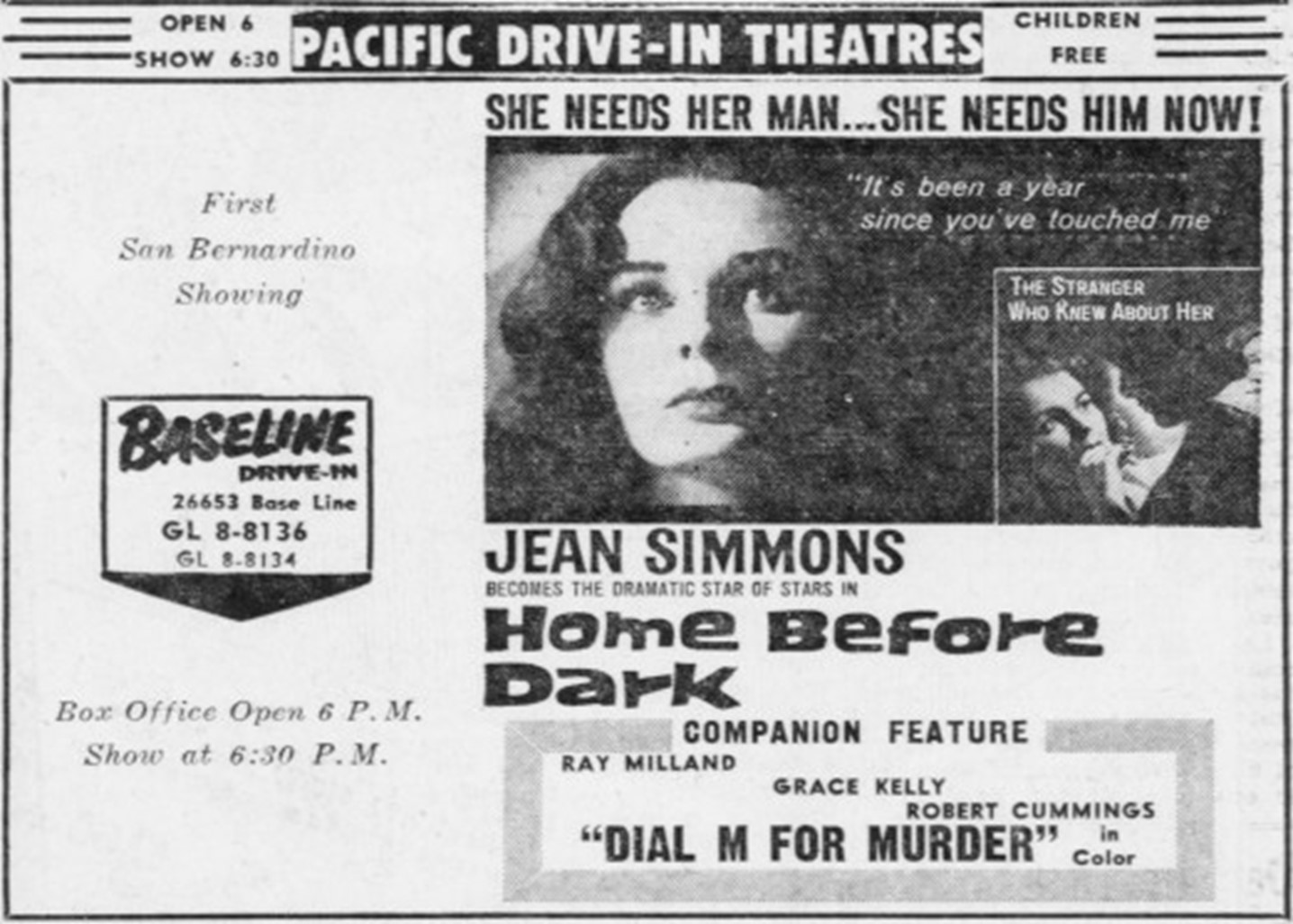
Drive-in advertisement from 1958

Back in the present, Inez and Charlotte meet Inez's friend in Boston, where they encounter Ham. When Charlotte and Ham talk over lunch he makes a drunken pass at her; he asks whether she is sure her suspicions of her sister's and husband's affair were wrong. Charlotte's old friend, Cathy Bergner, whose unfaithful spouse has confessed, asks Charlotte for advice, convinced Charlotte has experience with spousal infidelity. Shaken again by others' beliefs that Charlotte had not imagined the infidelity, Charlotte demands a straight answer from Arnold, who tells her she is relapsing. Afraid of being committed, she promises the family doctor she will be "good".

Befriending Charlotte, Jake also suggests she see a psychiatrist. Urged by Charlotte, Arnold takes her to Boston for Christmas, where he tries to avoid having his friends meet her. At lunch, Charlotte asks lawyer Ham to help her regain control of her finances. When she tells him Arnold is drugging her food, Ham also urges her to see a psychiatrist.

After a manic shopping spree, Charlotte copies Joan's flamboyant hairstyle and buys a gold lamé evening dress, several sizes too big, appropriate for Joan's voluptuous figure. The oversized dress is falling off her when she joins Arnold and his friends in the dining room, introducing herself as "Joan".

In the hotel room, Arnold weeps. Seeing something clearly wrong, Charlotte asks why, wanting the truth. Though not admitting infidelity, he finally tells her that he does not love her. They agree to divorce, though Charlotte promises to wait until end of the college semester in deference to Arnold's career.

At a New Year's party, Charlotte looks like herself again in her natural hair color. Joan is a hit in the gold dress that fits her figure; Charlotte realizes Arnold married an imitation of Joan. Finally aware of those against her in her own house, Charlotte fires Mattie and tells Arnold, Joan, and Inez they must vacate the house after the semester break. Calling Jake, Charlotte asks him to drive her to Boston. She asks Ham to arrange an appointment that day with his recommended psychiatrist. Jake drives her away into a wintry dawn.

== Cast ==
- Jean Simmons as Charlotte Bronn
- Dan O'Herlihy as Arnold Bronn
- Rhonda Fleming as Joan Carlisle
- Efrem Zimbalist Jr. as Jacob "Jake" Diamond
- Mabel Albertson as Inez Winthrop
- Steve Dunne as Hamilton "Ham" Gregory
- Joanna Barnes as Cathy Bergner
- Joan Weldon as Frances Barrett
- Kathryn Card as Mattie
- Marjorie Bennett as Hazel Evans
- Eleanor Audley as Mrs. Hathaway
- Johnstone White as Malcolm Southey
- Ed Prentiss as Dr. Collins (uncredited)

== Reception ==
When Bosley Crowther reviewed the film in the November 11, 1958, issue of The New York Times, he praised Simmons' portrayal of Charlotte Bronn, but little else: “For more than two hours, this hapless creature, whom the lovely Miss Simmons plays with a great deal more passion and sincerity than the hollow script justifies, tears her poor self to tatters in a situation that is slightly absurd, not only in its psychological pretense but also in the stilted way it is staged. Fetched home from a mental hospital by her curiously chilly spouse, … she finds herself once more confronted with the same circumstances that impelled her into the asylum in the first place. If anything, they are worse. …Miss Simmons thrashes around in this unnatural situation, stifling her love and jealousy, backing away from the temptatious boarder and getting progressively worse. Finally, after she has jumped her trolley and made an embarrassing scene in a Boston hotel, she asks the questions that have been obvious to any adult all along: "Why haven't I been taken to a psychiatrist?"—and, to her husband, "Do you love me?" He answers "No."That's about it. … the direction of Mr. LeRoy contributes to the thinness of the drama. While he has over-elaborated his sets, he has underelaborated his characters with the graphic glints that might make them meaningful….Happily, we are spared one superfluity…"Home Before Dark" is filmed appropriately in plain old-fashioned black and white.”

Variety staff wrote: “Home before Dark should give the Kleenex a vigorous workout. … it is a romantic melodrama of considerable power and imprint. The screenplay… sometimes seems rather skimpy in its character motivation. It is also difficult at times to understand the mental tone of the mentally ill heroine (Jean Simmons). But while the tale is unfolding it is made so gripping that factual discrepancies are relatively unimportant. (Simmons') stepmother (Mabel Albertson) and her stepsister (Rhonda Fleming)… are masterful females who could drive anyone to the edge of madness. Her only real ally in the house is a stranger (Efrem Zimbalist Jr), who is also an alien in the setting of the inbred New England college community…The whole picture is seen from Simmons’ viewpoint, which means she is ‘on’ virtually the whole time. Her voice is a vibrant instrument, used with thoughtful articulation and placement, the only vital part of her at times. Joseph Biroc's photography is suited to the grim New England atmosphere. It is winter, a depressingly gray winter, and the locations in Massachusetts give the picture the authentic feel.”

== Award nominations ==
The film was nominated for three Golden Globe awards: Jean Simmons for Best Actress (drama), Best Picture (drama), and Zimbalist for Best Supporting Actor.

== Home media ==
Home Before Dark was released to DVD by Warner Home Video on July 8, 2011, via its Warner Archive MOD DVD service.

== See also ==
- List of American films of 1958
