= State Police (film) =

1938 action film directed by John Rawlins

- Directed by: John Rawlins
- Screenplay by: George Waggner
- Story by: George Waggner
- Produced by: Paul Malvern
- Starring: John 'Dusty' King; William Lundigan; Constance Moore; Larry J. Blake; J. Farrell MacDonald; David Oliver
- Cinematography: Harry Neumann
- Edited by: Charles Craft
- Production company: Universal Pictures
- Distributed by: Universal Pictures
- Release date: March 18, 1938
- Running time: 61 minutes
- Country: United States
- Language: English

State Police is a 1938 American action film directed by John Rawlins and written by George Waggner. The film stars John 'Dusty' King, William Lundigan, Constance Moore, Larry J. Blake, J. Farrell MacDonald and David Oliver. The film was released on March 18, 1938, by Universal Pictures.

== Plot ==
When his son is expelled from college, Colonel Clarke, head of the State Police, assigns him to the patrol of Sergeant Dan Prescott as Private Smith. "Smith" disobeys Dan's order and makes a play for his girl Helen Evans. During a shutdown of unprofitable coal mines at Minersburg, the gang of racketeer "Trigger" Magee levies tribute on the miners who are mining coal for their own use. Magee kills Albert Morgan for opposing him, and Dan gets order to arrest Magee and clean up the situation. "Smith" quits the force and becomes involved with the gangsters headquartered at "The Oaks," a notorious resort ran by Helen's brother Jack. The latter double-crosses Magee and is killed by him. Magee is arrested, escapes and makes "Smith" a prisoner and beats him unconscious for refusing to phone his father to call off the police hunt. Miners, led by Joe Palmer and Charlie, organize to clean out the gangsters while Dan's troopers are also closing in.

== Cast ==
- John 'Dusty' King as Sgt. Dan Prescott
- William Lundigan as Pvt. Smith / Bill Clarke
- Constance Moore as Helen Evans
- Larry J. Blake as Trigger Magee
- J. Farrell MacDonald as Charlie Wheeler
- David Oliver as Cpl. Duffy
- Ted Osborne as Jack Evans
- Pierre Watkin as Col. C.B. Clarke
- Guy Usher as Hughes
- Charles C. Wilson as Capt. Halstead
- Eddy Waller as Const. Higgins
- Sam Flint as Deputy Joe Palmer
