= The Underwater City =

1962 film by Frank McDonald

- Film poster
- Directed by: Frank McDonald
- Written by: Ruth Alexander (story); Alex Gordon; Orville H. Hampton
- Screenplay by: Owen Harris
- Produced by: Alex Gordon
- Starring: William Lundigan; Julie Adams
- Cinematography: Gordon Avil
- Edited by: Al Clark; Don Starling
- Music by: Ronald Stein
- Production company: Neptune Productions
- Distributed by: Columbia Pictures
- Release date: August 2, 1962
- Running time: 78 minutes
- Country: United States
- Language: English
- Budget: $350,000 (estimated)

The Underwater City is a 1962 American science fiction film in Eastmancolor, about overcoming engineering obstacles for establishing an underwater living environment. The film was directed by Frank McDonald, produced by Alex Gordon and written by Gordon's wife Ruth Alexander. Columbia Pictures released the film as a double feature with The Three Stooges Meet Hercules.

== Plot ==
Dr. Halstead (Carl Benton Reid) of the Institute of Oceanography hires Bob Gage (William Lundigan) to supervise the construction of an underwater city. If humans are going to blow themselves sky-high at some point in the future, then it might be a good idea to have an escape hatch down at the bottom of the ocean. Gage falls in love with Dr. Halstead's niece, Dr. Monica Powers (Julie Adams). A series of underwater living units are carefully created and tested until it seems that they are ready for residents to move in. What no one considers is that the sea floor and the sea itself may not be as stable as expected.

== Cast ==
- William Lundigan as Cmdr. Bob Gage
- Julie Adams as Dr. Monica Powers
- Roy Roberts as Tim Graham
- Carl Benton Reid as Dr. Junius Halstead
- Chet Douglas as Chuck Marlow
- Paul Dubov as George Burnett
- Karen Norris as Phyllis Gatewood
- Kathie Browne as Dottie Steele
- Edward Mallory as Lt. Wally Steele

== Production ==
Originally shown in black and white in the theaters, it was later released to television in color. The filming was fraught with conflict, leading to a lawsuit by Neptune Productions against Columbia Pictures.

Alex Gordon recalls that his wife was inspired by an article in American Weekly magazine about scientists growing food on the ocean floor. Gordon also recalled that the original choice for Dr. Halstead, Raymond Massey was replaced when he couldn't arrive in time to commence production. The film was originally supposed to be the first of a six-picture deal with Columbia for Gordon but the deal was dropped.

== Comic book adaptation ==
- Dell Four Color #1328 (1962)
