= Serpent of the Nile =

1953 film by William Castle

- Directed by: William Castle
- Written by: Robert E. Kent
- Produced by: Sam Katzman
- Starring: Rhonda Fleming; William Lundigan; Raymond Burr
- Narrated by: Fred F. Sears
- Cinematography: Henry Freulich
- Edited by: Gene Havlick
- Music by: Mischa Bakaleinikoff
- Production companies: Sam Katzman Productions; Esskay Productions
- Distributed by: Columbia Pictures
- Release date: May 8, 1953
- Running time: 81 minutes
- Country: United States
- Language: English

Serpent of the Nile is a 1953 American Technicolor historical adventure film produced by Sam Katzman and directed by William Castle. The film starred Rhonda Fleming, Raymond Burr, William Lundigan, and Michael Ansara. In an early role, actress Julie Newmar (credited as Julie Newmeyer) appears as an exotic dancer clad only in gold paint (and a gold fabric bikini of early 1950s style). It also stars William Lundigan as Lucilius and Michael Fox as Octavius.

== Plot ==
The film opens in 44 BC, just after the assassination of Julius Caesar, and tells the story of the Egyptian Queen Cleopatra (Fleming) and her relationship with the Roman general Mark Antony (Burr) from that time until their mutual suicide in 30 BC. Lucilius, having previously accompanied Julius Caesar to Egypt and having been a close witness to Caesar's romance with Cleopatra, believes that Cleopatra is a woman highly skilled in besotting men to promote her own agenda, in this case to bind Mark Antony to her desire to become queen of Rome and to make her son by Caesar the eventual ruler of the Roman Empire. In the meantime, as Lucilius becomes aware, Cleopatra is beguiling Antony with continuous showings of feasting and luxury while the vast population of Egypt is suffering in hunger and poverty. When Lucilius reveals his concerns to Cleopatra, she makes an unsuccessful attempt to seduce him, in order to win him to her side. Cleopatra persuades Antony that all this disaffection is the work of her younger half-sister, Arsinoe, and Lucilius is sent on an expedition against her in which she is (unhistorically) killed. Lucilius returns from this trip wounded by Cleopatra's own soldiers and even more distrustful of her, and is confined to his apartments as an honored prisoner, while Antony continues to have his judgment clouded with constant feasting and drinking (and, although this is not mentioned, some sort of physical contact with Cleopatra's person). But Antony dimly realizes that he has failed in his duties to Rome, most specifically in his role as a member of the ruling triumvirate, and that Cleopatra is scheming to use him to conquer Rome to make him king and herself queen and Caesar's son the next absolute ruler of Rome, but he knows that Romans will never accept such a development; so he enables Lucilius to escape, with instructions to return to Rome and warn Octavius of what is happening in Egypt. (Unlike the Elizabeth Taylor version, this Cleopatra is not madly in love with Antony, but is merely using him as a stepping stone). Soon enough Octavius brings Roman armies to Egypt to subdue this incipient mutiny. In this movie it would appear that a conscience-stricken Antony stays in Cleopatra's palace, refusing to lead an Egyptian army against his beloved Rome. As Octavius closes in, Antony stabs himself, Lucilius breaches the palace gates in time to bring a dying Antony to Cleopatra's chamber, and Cleopatra, in despair of the complete frustration of her ambitions, uses a snake to kill herself. This brings the movie to its end before we see Cleopatra die.

== Cast ==
- Rhonda Fleming as Cleopatra
- William Lundigan as Lucilius
- Raymond Burr as Marcus Antonius
- Jean Byron as Charmian
- Michael Ansara as Captain Florus
- Michael Fox as Octavius
- Conrad Wolfe as Elderly Assassin
- John Crawford as Captain Domitius
- Jane Easton as Cytheris
- Robert Griffin as Brutus
- Frederic Berest as Marculius
- Julie Newmar as The Golden Girl (Credited as Julie Newmeyer)
- Ted Hecht as Serapian, Viceroy of Cypress
- Steven Ritch
- Fred F. Sears as The Narrator

== Production ==
In November 1951 Katzman announced he would make the movie based on Cleopatra by H. Rider Haggard. It was part of an eight-film slate he was making at Columbia, others including Prince of Pirates with Paul Henreid, Slaves of Babylon, Cairo to Suez, Jack McCall, Desperado, The Pathfinder, Siren of Bagdad, and Flame of Calcutta.

In May 1952 Katzman said the film would start in August. It was not made until 1953, when it was William Castle's first film at Columbia after a number of years at Universal. According to Castle, Katzman told the director this was Katzman's most ambitious film to date. Castle says the film was sold to the public as "2 years in the making" when Katzman had in reality only been talking about making it for two years. Castle said the correct ad copy should have been "2 Years in The Talking. Fifteen days in the making." By July, Rhonda Fleming and William Lundigan were attached to star.

The title was apparently adapted from Shakespeare's Antony and Cleopatra, Act I, scene 5.

The film had a very low budget. It was shot on the sets left over from Rita Hayworth's Salome. One sequence depicts a chariot racing through the sands of Egypt towards a sand dune in the distance, behind which looms a pyramid. It is extremely obvious that this composition (like many others) is a matte shot: the pyramid in the background is a superimposed painting, with the sand dune concealing the join between the live action and the matte. Elsewhere in the film, Rhonda Fleming as Cleopatra is clearly wearing a "bullet bra" of the style that was fashionable in the 1950s, and the Egyptian dancing girls are wearing bikinis of the same era.
