= Inferno (1953 film) =

1953 American drama/thriller by Roy Ward Baker

- Theatrical release poster
- Directed by: Roy Ward Baker
- Screenplay by: Francis Cockrell
- Produced by: William Bloom
- Starring: Robert Ryan; Rhonda Fleming; William Lundigan
- Cinematography: Lucien Ballard
- Edited by: Robert L. Simpson
- Music by: Paul Sawtell
- Distributed by: 20th Century-Fox
- Release date: August 12, 1953 (United States)
- Running time: 83 minutes
- Country: United States
- Language: English
- Budget: $1,055,000

Inferno is a 1953 American thriller drama starring Robert Ryan, William Lundigan and Rhonda Fleming, directed by Roy Ward Baker. It was shot in Technicolor and shown in 3-D, with stereophonic sound.

== Plot ==
When millionaire industrialist Donald Carson III breaks his leg during a trip through the Mojave Desert, his wife Gerry and her lover, mining engineer Joe Duncan, tell him they will seek medical aid. They deliberately don't return, however, hoping Carson will perish while he is stranded in the desert. He vows to survive in order to exact revenge on his adulterous wife and her accomplice, who have flown to Carson's mansion in Los Angeles while waiting for him to either succumb to the desert heat, or commit suicide. Instead, Carson fashions a splint for his leg, which allows him to limp down the rocks where he was abandoned and make his way through the desert. He successfully digs a well and shoots a deer, making strips of dried meat that last several days.

Law-enforcement officers had hoped to find the missing Carson, but, after several unsuccessful attempts, decide to call off further search efforts. Joe is getting nervous though; to make sure Carson is dead, he flies a small plane over the area and spots the remnants of a fire. Suspecting Carson is still alive, Joe and Gerry drive back into the desert to look for him and finish him off if necessary. Joe discovers Carson still limping through the desert; he is about to shoot him when an old prospector called Elby, driving a jalopy, encounters Carson and gives him a ride back to his shack. On returning to his own car, Joe finds that in her haste to leave him, Gerry has accidentally driven his car over a large rock, rupturing the oil pan. The damage makes it impossible for them to drive out of the desert. Joe sees a pair of binoculars on the car seat and he suddenly realizes that her real intention when she moved the car was to abandon both him and her husband. Joe walks away, leaving Gerry to fend for herself.

That evening at his shack, Elby prepares a supper for Carson, who confesses to his rescuer that although revenge is what sustained him, the treachery of his wife and her lover no longer seem important. As Elby goes outside to his well for water, he is knocked out by Joe, who spotted the light emanating from his shack. Joe shoots at Carson, but misses. The two men engage in a desperate, brutal fist-fight inside the shack. A toppled stove causes the shack to catch fire. With both men barely conscious, Elby comes to just in time to drag Carson to safety while Joe perishes in the blaze. The next day, as Elby is driving Carson to the nearest town, they spy Gerry walking alone on a long, remote stretch of desert road. Elby stops his car beside her and Carson calmly tells her that she can either wait for the authorities to find her, or ride into town with them. She reluctantly climbs onto the back of the car and the car continues down the road.

== Cast ==
- Robert Ryan as Donald Whitley Carson III
- Rhonda Fleming as Geraldine Carson
- William Lundigan as Joseph Duncan
- Larry Keating as Dave Emory
- Henry Hull as Sam Elby
- Carl Betz as Lt. Mike Platt
- Robert Burton as Sheriff
- Robert Adler as Ken, Ranch Hand
- Harry Carter as Deputy Fred Parks
- Everett Glass as Mason, Carson's Butler
- Adrienne Marden as Emory's Secretary
- Barbara Pepper as Waitress
- Charles Tannen as voice of police radio broadcaster
- Dan White as Lee, Ranch Hand

== Production ==
Inferno was 20th Century Fox's first 3-D film.

== Release ==
The 2-D version of the film was released on October 8, 1953.

=== Critical response ===
"The remarkable suspense passage of Carson (Robert Ryan) alone in the desert owed much to the three-dimensional color process for which Inferno was made. Unluckily, Inferno was completed just as the 3-D vogue of the early Fifties was on the wane, and, in many cinemas Inferno was shown flat. By a stroke of good fortune, I caught a screening in 3-D before this decision was made [in the 1950s]. The process, [though] technically crude...had suffered during the vogue for lack of imagination. The potential was squandered in a welter of funfair trickery, with much emphasis on throwing things ‘out of’ the screen ‘into’ the audience. Certainly Inferno had its rearing rattlesnake and hurtling rocks, but it was the only film of the 3-D phase that in Hollywood to take proper dramatic advantage of depth in the background. The vastness of the desert, stretching away toward a distant horizon, intensified Carson’s isolation to a degree much greater than one might have supposed...the background depth of the desert scenes in Baker’s film gave me cause to regret that, on the very brink of discovery, the possibilities of the 3-D process were thrown away.” —Film historian Gordon Gow in Suspense in the Cinema (1968)

When the film was released, The New York Times gave the film a positive review and lauded the direction of the picture and the acting, writing,

[A]s fragmentary realism the picture rings true and persuasive. Mr. Ryan's portrayal of the gritty, determined protagonist is, of course, a natural. Miss Fleming, one of Hollywood's coolest, prettiest villainesses, knows how to handle literate dialogue, which, in this case, she shares.

In a positive review, Time Out Film Guide called the film, "A tight and involving essay in suspense which works on the ingenious idea of leaving the audience alone in the desert with an unsympathetic and selfish character," and noted the finer aspects of the 3-D film, writing,

Inferno was one of the best and last movies to be made in 3-D during the boom in the early '50s. Certainly its use of space emphasized the dramatic possibilities of 3-D and reveals, as more than one person has observed, that the device had largely been squandered in other films made at the time.

Film critic Dennis Schwartz liked the film and wrote,

Inferno loses something when not seen in 3-D as intended when released, nevertheless it remains as a taut survival thriller. It makes good use of 3-D, in fact it does it better than most other such gimmicky films ... The desert photography by Lucien Ballard is stunning.

=== Revival screenings ===
On February 1, 2013, Inferno was shown in digital 3-D in a double feature with Man in the Dark (1953) in the Noir City Film Festival at the Castro Theater in San Francisco.

=== Home media ===
Inferno has been made available on Hulu in anaglyph 3D (not its native format), and was released as a 3D Blu-ray disc in the UK by Panamint, and in the United States by Twilight Time.

== Remake ==
Inferno was remade for television in 1973 as Ordeal, with Arthur Hill in the Robert Ryan part and Diana Muldaur and James Stacy as his would-be murderers.

== See also ==
- List of 3D films
- Survival film
