= Freshman Year (film) =

1938 film by Frank McDonald

- Directed by: Frank McDonald
- Starring: Constance Moore; William Lundigan
- Production company: Universal
- Release date: 1938
- Running time: 65 mins
- Country: United States
- Language: English

Freshman Year is a 1938 film, notable as the uncredited film debut of actor Arthur O'Connell.
