= Love Nest =

1951 film by Joseph M. Newman

- VHS release cover art
- Directed by: Joseph Newman
- Written by: I.A.L. Diamond
- Based on: The Reluctant Landlord a 1950 novel by Scott Corbett
- Produced by: Jules Buck
- Starring: June Haver; William Lundigan; Frank Fay; Marilyn Monroe; Jack Paar
- Cinematography: Lloyd Ahern
- Edited by: J. Watson Webb Jr.
- Music by: Cyril Mockridge
- Production company: Twentieth Century-Fox
- Distributed by: Twentieth Century-Fox
- Release date: October 10, 1951
- Running time: 85 minutes
- Country: United States
- Language: English

Love Nest is a 1951 American comedy-drama film directed by Joseph Newman and starring June Haver, William Lundigan, Frank Fay, Jack Paar and Marilyn Monroe in an early supporting role. The film marks the final screen appearances by Fay and silent-film star Leatrice Joy.

== Plot ==
When American serviceman and writer Jim Scott returns from Paris after World War II, he is flabbergasted to discover that his well-meaning but unrealistic wife Connie has invested his wages in a dilapidated apartment building in the Gramercy Park neighborhood of Manhattan. Despite Connie's hope that being a landlord will give Jim the freedom to write a novel, he spends most of his time with building maintenance.

Smooth-talking Charley Patterson, a confidence man who romances and swindles wealthy widows, leases a vacant apartment and targets gentle but poor widow Eadie Gaynor. Jim persuades Connie to rent an apartment to an old Army buddy, who is revealed to be a stunning former WAC named Roberta Stevens.

An FBI agent visits the Scotts to ask about Mr. Patterson, but will not divulge any information. The Scotts spot Patterson, who is supposed to be out of town on business, at a fancy restaurant dancing with and romancing a woman.

A building inspector informs the Scotts that they must repair exposed wiring in their building within 15 days or the building will be condemned, but Jim learns that the repair will be so expensive that he must sell the building.. Charley and Eadie announce their engagement and depart the next day to be married. When Charley returns, he lends Jim $800 for the repairs, bur Jim still wants to sell, as he is convinced that the building is a money pit. After arguing with Connie, Jim sleeps in a backyard hammock. When the hammock breaks, Jim, knowing that Bobbie is away on a modeling assignment, goes to sleep in her empty apartment, but she returns the next morning before he awakens and Connie mistakenly believes that Bobbie, of whom she is already jealous, and Jim have spent the night together.

After a newspaper story fingers Charley as having hoodwinked another old widow, Connie and Jim confront Charley, who does not deny his guilt but assures them that he truly loves Eadie and has just finished his last con. When Jim mentions the visit from the FBI agent, Charley starts packing, but the police arrive before he can escape. Charley reassures Eadie that she is the only woman whom he has ever loved.

Charley, who wishes to plead guilty and pay the price for his crimes, arranges for Jim's arrest for receiving the $800 from him, as it was part of the money that he had swindled from the old woman. Jim is infuriated, but Charley explains that he has been offered $5,000 for a series of articles on his escapades that Jim must write. The articles lead to a bestselling book.

After 18 months, Charley is released from prison and reunites with Eadie. Jim and Connie, who have beautified the apartment building with Jim's royalties, watch in amusement as Eadie and Charley take their infant twin daughters for a walk.

== Cast ==
- June Haver as Connie Scott
- William Lundigan as Jim Scott
- Frank Fay as Charles Kenneth "Charley" Patterson
- Marilyn Monroe as Roberta "Bobbie" Stevens
- Jack Paar as Ed Forbes
- Leatrice Joy as Eadie Gaynor
- Henry Kulky as George Thompson

Uncredited

- Marie Blake as Mrs. Quigg
- Lois Wilde as Mrs. Mackey
- Martha Wentworth as Mrs. Thompson
- Bob Jellison as Fain
- Patricia Miller as Florence Gaynor
- Maude Wallace as Mrs. Arnold
- Ray Montgomery as Gray
- Faire Binney as Gladys Frazier
- Harry Hines as Building Inspector
- Charles Calvert as Knowland
- Jack Daly as Clark

== Production ==
Set in New York City just after World War II, the film's screenplay was adapted by I.A.L. Diamond from Scott Corbett's 1950 novel The Reluctant Landlord. The film's title is derived from the song "Love Nest", written by Louis Hirsch (music) and Otto A. Harbach (lyrics). The song, which is sung by a chorus over the opening credits, was also used as the theme song for The Burns and Allen Show on radio and The George Burns and Gracie Allen Show on television.

== Reception ==
In a contemporary review for The Philadelphia Inquirer, critic Mildred Martin called the film an "amiable, ambling little comedy" and wrote: "Although the film's surprise tag may verge upon the questionable, it's still good for a gasp and a giggle which is all it is aimed at. ... Apparently partial to the senior members of the cast, Joseph Newman hasn't bothered to put much variety into his direction of Lundigan, Miss Haver or the other comparative youngsters who are left too much to their own. not especially resourceful resources for the film's good."

In the Chicago Tribune, critic Mae Tinée wrote: "Thanks to a moderately bright script and some likable people in the cast, this movie adds up to airy and amiable entertainment."
