= The Redhead and the Cowboy =

1951 film by Leslie Fenton

- Theatrical release poster
- Directed by: Leslie Fenton
- Written by: Jonathan Latimer; Liam O'Brien
- Produced by: Irving Asher
- Starring: Rhonda Fleming; Glenn Ford; Edmond O'Brien
- Cinematography: Daniel Fapp
- Edited by: Arthur P. Schmidt
- Music by: David Buttolph
- Distributed by: Paramount Pictures
- Release dates: March 15, 1951 (Los Angeles); June 5, 1951 (New York)
- Running time: 82 minutes
- Country: United States
- Language: English
- Box office: $1.25 million (U.S. rentals)

The Redhead and the Cowboy is a 1951 American Western film directed by Leslie Fenton and starring Glenn Ford and Rhonda Fleming.

== Plot ==
Late in the American Civil War, the New Mexico Territory is full of spies and guerrillas for both sides. Cowboy Gil Kyle, realizing that many of these people are merely criminals out for themselves, tries to steer clear of the conflict but finds violence and hostility. After a brief encounter with a beautiful new saloon girl, he stumbles into a crime scene and becomes a fugitive wanted for murder.

His only alibi is the girl, Candace Bronson, who has disappeared. She is aiding the Confederate cause and has fled to deliver a vital message about a Union gold shipment. Kyle pursues her, and along the way, he encounters desperadoes, government agents, guerrilla fighters and renegades, some of whom have unclear loyalties.

== Cast ==
- Glenn Ford as Gil Kyle
- Edmond O'Brien as Maj. Dunn Jeffers
- Rhonda Fleming as Candace Bronson
- Alan Reed as Col. Lamartine
- Morris Ankrum as the Sheriff
- Edith Evanson as Mrs. Barrett
- Perry Ivins as Mr. Barrett
- Janine Perreau as Mary Barrett
- Douglas Spencer as Perry
- Ray Teal as Brock
- Ralph Byrd as Capt. Andrews
- King Donovan as Munro
- Tom Moore as Gus
- Jeff York as Lt. Wylie (uncredited)
- Emory Parnell as Northern Sympathizer Barfly

== Reception ==
In a contemporary review for The New York Times, critic Bosley Crowther wrote: "'The Redhead and the Cowboy' ... is one that may easily fool you, if you go by the sound of the tag. For that title conveys an expectation of a knockout dude-ranch farce, entangling a chick from the city and a bow-legged lone-prairee boy. Guess again. It's a tight-reined Western spy film, stuffed with murders and mystery, ending up with a wagon-train gun fight, and not bad, as such roughage goes."

Critic Edwin Schallert of the Los Angeles Times wrote: "'The Redhead and the Cowboy' strains at times for action, and is complex almost to the point of being confusing in its plot. But its melodramatic values are of a high grade, and the activities and characterizations that are demanded of its principals will cast no serious shadow over their efforts."
