= Sunday Punch (film) =

1942 film by David Miller

- Theatrical release poster
- Directed by: David Miller
- Written by: Fay Kanin; Michael Kanin; Allen Rivkin
- Produced by: Irving Starr
- Starring: William Lundigan; Jean Rogers; Dan Dailey
- Cinematography: Paul C. Vogel
- Edited by: Albert Akst
- Music by: David Snell
- Distributed by: Metro-Goldwyn-Mayer
- Release date: May 8, 1942
- Running time: 76 minutes
- Country: United States
- Language: English
- Budget: $305,000
- Box office: $373,000

Sunday Punch is a 1942 comedy film directed by David Miller and starring William Lundigan and Jean Rogers.

== Plot ==
Boxers managed by Bassler and trained by Roscoe live in an all-male Brooklyn boardinghouse, where the arrival of the landlady's niece Judy gets their attention.

Judy gets to know Ken Burke, who quit medical school to try boxing, and Ole Jensen, the young janitor. Bassler is concerned that Ken's interest in Judy is distracting him, so he tries to find her a job as a singer.

Ole packs a "Sunday punch" that knocks out a pro. He decides to be a prizefighter to earn money to impress Judy, but no one except "Pops" Muller will agree to train him. Ken and Ole rise in the ranks, but reject a $30,000 offer to fight each other due to their friendship.

Their managers conspire to set up the bout. Judy roots for Ole to win, but only because that way Ken might give up boxing and become a doctor. Their story climaxes with the big fight.

== Cast ==
- William Lundigan as Ken Burke
- Jean Rogers as Judy Galestrum
- Dan Dailey as Olaf Jensen
- Guy Kibbee as Pops Muller
- J. Carrol Naish as Matt Bassler
- Connie Gilchrist as Ma Galestrum
- Sam Levene as Rosco
- Leo Gorcey as Biff
- "Rags" Ragland as Killer Connolly
- Douglass Newland as Baby Fitzroy
- Anthony Caruso as Nat Cucci

== Reception ==
The film earned $229,000 in the US and Canada and $144,000 elsewhere during its initial theatrical run, making MGM a loss of $79,000.

== See also ==
- List of boxing films
