= William Lundigan =

American actor (1914–1975)

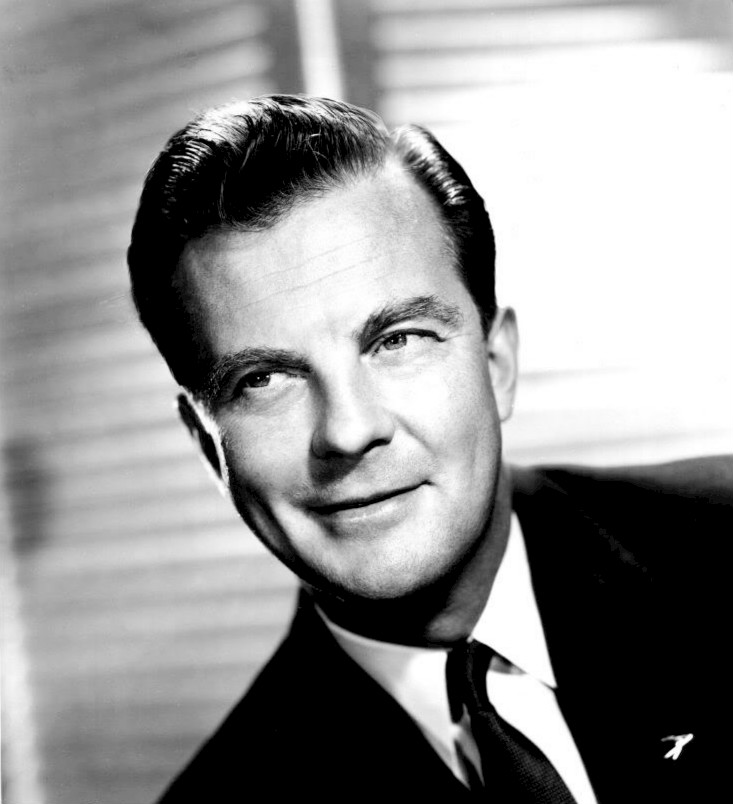
- Lundigan in 1957
- Born: William Paul Lundigan; June 12, 1914; Syracuse, New York, U.S.
- Died: December 20, 1975 (aged 61); Duarte, California, U.S.
- Occupation: Actor
- Years active: 1937–1971
- Spouse: Rena Morgan (m. 1945)
- Children: 1

William Paul Lundigan (June 12, 1914 – December 20, 1975) was an American film actor. His more than 125 films include Dodge City (1939), The Fighting 69th (1940), The Sea Hawk (1940), Santa Fe Trail (1940), Dishonored Lady (1947), Pinky (1949), Love Nest (1951) with Marilyn Monroe, The House on Telegraph Hill (1951), I'd Climb the Highest Mountain (1951) and Inferno (1953).

== Biography ==
Growing up in Syracuse, New York, Lundigan was the oldest of four sons. His father, Michael F. Lundigan, owned a shoe store (at which Lundigan worked) in the same building as a local radio station, WFBL. Becoming fascinated by radio, he was playing child roles on radio and producing radio plays at 16.

A graduate of Nottingham High School, Lundigan studied law at Syracuse University, earning money as a radio announcer at WFBL. He graduated and passed the bar examination before events changed his career path. Charles Rogers, a Universal Pictures production chief, heard Lundigan's voice, met him, arranged a screen test and signed him to a motion picture contract in 1937.

== Universal ==
He was in Armored Car (1937) billed as "Larry Parker". Then his name was changed to "William Lundigan" for West Bound Limited (1937).

Lundigan was billed third in The Lady Fights Back (1937) and then promoted to male lead for That's My Story! (1937). He was back down the cast list for The Black Doll (1938) and Reckless Living (1938) but was the male lead for State Police (1938). He had support parts in Wives Under Suspicion (1938) directed by James Whale, Danger on the Air (1938), The Missing Guest (1938), and Freshman Year (1938).

Lundigan was one of the romantic leads in Three Smart Girls Grow Up (1939). Warners borrowed him for a support part in Dodge City (1939).

Lundigan was top billed in They Asked for It (1939) then was Sigrid Gurie's leading man in The Forgotten Woman (1939). He supported in Legion of Lost Flyers (1939). He said "nothing much happened" of his time at Universal and left the studio.

== Warner Bros ==
Lundigan signed with Warner Bros, where he had support roles in The Old Maid (1939), The Fighting 69th (1940), 3 Cheers for the Irish (1940), The Man Who Talked Too Much (1940), Young America Flies (1940, a short), The Sea Hawk (1940), Service with the Colors (1940, a short), East of the River (1940), and Santa Fe Trail (1940).

Lundigan later described this period as "I was always turning up as Olivia de Havilland's weak brother. Well, I got in a rut - that old bugaboo, type casting - and made one quickie after another."

Warners promoted him to the lead of some "B"s, The Case of the Black Parrot (1941) and A Shot in the Dark (1941); he was support in The Great Mr. Nobody (1941), Highway West (1941) and International Squadron (1941).

Lundigan then had a lead in Sailors on Leave (1941) for Republic Pictures.

== MGM ==
Lundigan went to MGM where he had support roles in The Bugle Sounds (1942) and The Courtship of Andy Hardy (1942). He was promoted to the lead of a "B", Sunday Punch (1942) and had the second lead in Apache Trail (1942) and Northwest Rangers (1942).

He reprised his role from the Andy Hardy series in Andy Hardy's Double Life (1942) and supported in Dr. Gillespie's Criminal Case (1943) and Salute to the Marines (1943). Republic asked him back to play the lead in Headin' for God's Country (1943).

== World War II ==
He enlisted in the U.S. Marine Corps during World War II and served as a combat cameraman in the Battle of Peleliu and the Battle of Okinawa, returning at war's end as a corporal. He was wounded on Okinawa.

== Post War ==
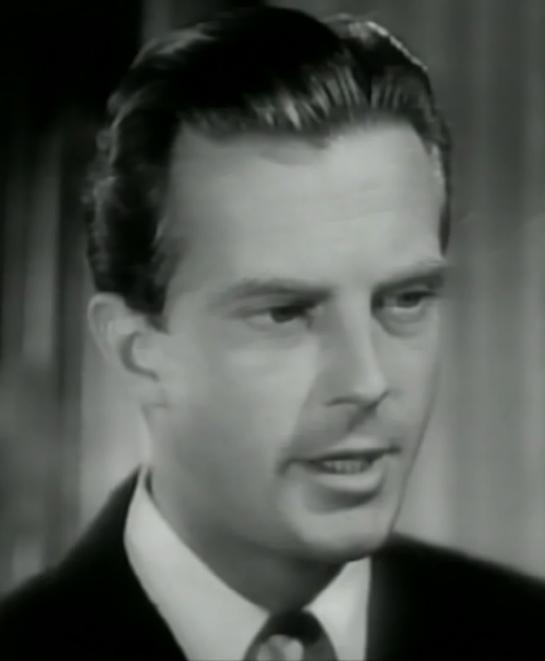
Lundigan in The Fabulous Dorseys (1947)

Lundigan returned to Hollywood and tried freelancing. He had support roles in some independent movies, The Fabulous Dorseys (1947) and Dishonored Lady (1947). He was the leading man in Republic's The Inside Story (1948) and was top billed in Mystery in Mexico (1948), State Department: File 649 (1949) and Follow Me Quietly (1949). He decided to try acting on stage and was cast by John Ford in a revival of What Price Glory?.

== 20th Century Fox ==
Lundigan's career revived when he successfully auditioned for the role of Jeanne Crain's romantic interest in Pinky (1949) at 20th Century Fox, initially directed by Ford (Elia Kazan took over). The movie was a huge hit and the studio signed him to a long-term contract. He went on to be leading man to Dorothy McGuire in Mother Didn't Tell Me (1950), June Haver in I'll Get By (1950) and Love Nest (1951), Susan Hayward in I'd Climb the Highest Mountain (1951).

He was also in The House on Telegraph Hill (1951) and Elopement (1951), and was the male lead in Down Among the Sheltering Palms (1952) and Serpent of the Nile (1953). The New York Times called him "the male counterpart to the girl next door".

He had a good part in Inferno (1953).

== Television ==
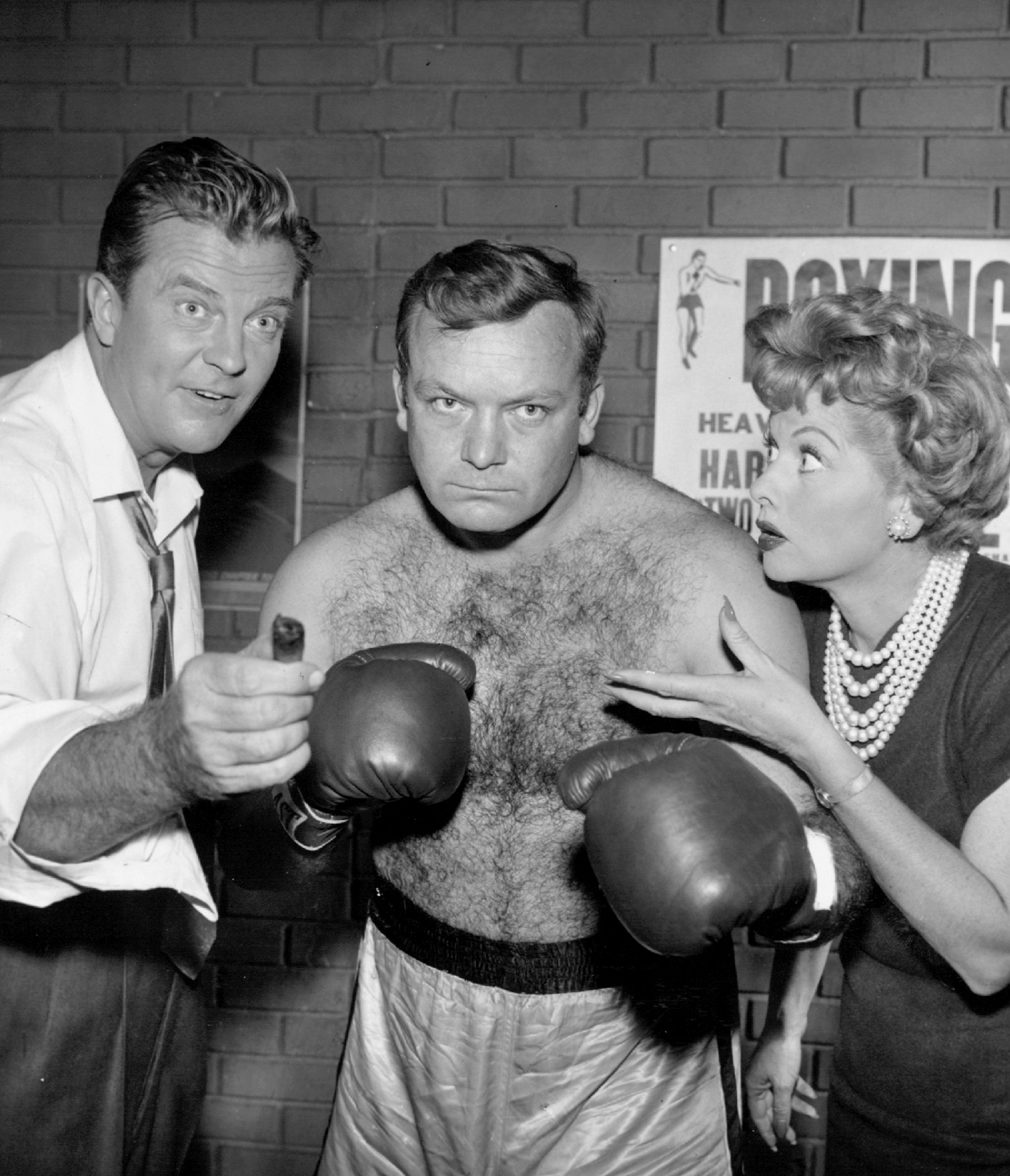
In an episode of Desilu Playhouse, "K.O. Kitty", L-R: William Lundigan, Aldo Ray, and Lucille Ball (1958).

Lundigan began appearing on TV shows like Lux Video Theatre, Schlitz Playhouse, General Electric Theater, The Ford Television Theatre, and The Star and the Story and was host for Climax! and Shower of Stars.

He had the lead in some low budget films like Riders to the Stars (1954), Dangerous Voyage (1954) and The White Orchid (1954), the latter for Reginald LeBorg. He mostly worked on television now, such as episodes of Science Fiction Theatre, Playhouse 90 and Westinghouse Desilu Playhouse, and travelled the country extensively selling automobiles, including, in 1955, making a commercial for the Chrysler turbine engine.

From September 30, 1959, to September 7, 1960, Lundigan portrayed Col. Edward McCauley in the CBS television series, Men into Space.

In 1961, Lundigan was cast as Nathaniel Norgate in the episode, "Dangerous Crossing", on the syndicated anthology series, Death Valley Days, hosted by Stanley Andrews. The story focuses on religious settlers who encounter outlaws operating an illegal tollgate.

He had the lead in The Underwater City (1962) and guest starred on The Dick Powell Theatre , Run for Your Life, Medical Center and Marcus Welby, M.D.. His last film was The Way West (1967).

== Politics ==
In 1963 and 1964, Lundigan joined fellow actors Walter Brennan, Chill Wills, and Efrem Zimbalist, Jr., in making appearances on behalf of U.S. Senator Barry M. Goldwater, the Republican nominee in the campaign against U.S. President Lyndon B. Johnson.

Lundigan himself waged an unsuccessful campaign for a nominally non-partisan seat on the Los Angeles City Council.

== Family ==
Lundigan married Rena Morgan, and they had a daughter, Anastasia.

== Death ==
Lundigan died at the age of 61 of apparent heart failure at City of Hope Medical Center in Duarte, California.

== Radio appearances ==
- 1951 Screen Guild Players ("Apartment for Peggy")
- 1952 Stars in the Air ("Deep Waters")

== Filmography ==
- 1937: Armored Car as Henry Hutchins
- 1937: West Bound Limited as Dispatcher
- 1937: The Lady Fights Back as Doug McKenzie
- 1937: That's My Story as Howard Field
- 1937: A Girl with Ideas as Herman (uncredited)
- 1937: Prescription for Romance as Officer (uncredited)
- 1938: The Jury's Secret as Announcer (uncredited)
- 1938: The Black Doll as Rex Leland
- 1938: Reckless Living as Stanley Shaw
- 1938: The Crime of Doctor Hallet as Party Guest (uncredited)
- 1938: State Police as Pvt. Smith / Bill Clarke
- 1938: Sinners in Paradise as Radio Announcer (voice, uncredited)
- 1938: Wives Under Suspicion as Phil
- 1938: Danger on the Air as Dave Chapman
- 1938: Letter of Introduction as Minor Role (uncredited)
- 1938: The Missing Guest as Larry Dearden
- 1938: Freshman Year as Bob Potter
- 1939: Three Smart Girls Grow Up as Richard Watkins
- 1939: Dodge City as Lee Irving
- 1939: They Asked for It as Steve Lewis
- 1939: The Forgotten Woman as Terence Kennedy
- 1939: The Old Maid as Lanning Halsey
- 1939: Legion of Lost Flyers as Ralph Perry
- 1940: The Fighting 69th as Timmy Wynn
- 1940: Three Cheers for the Irish as Michael Flaherty
- 1940: The Man Who Talked Too Much as John L. Forbes
- 1940: Young America Flies (Short) as Bill Brown
- 1940: The Sea Hawk as Danny Logan
- 1940: Service with the Colors (Short) as Thomas Stanton
- 1940: East of the River as Nicholas Antonio 'Nick' Lorenzo
- 1940: Santa Fe Trail as Bob Holliday
- 1941: The Case of the Black Parrot as Jim Moore
- 1941: The Great Mr. Nobody as Richard Amesworth
- 1941: A Shot in the Dark as Peter Kennedy
- 1941: Highway West as Dave Warren
- 1941: International Squadron as Lt. Rog Wilkins
- 1941: Sailors on Leave as Chuck Stephens
- 1942: The Bugle Sounds as Joe 'Joey' Hanson
- 1942: The Courtship of Andy Hardy as Jeff Willis
- 1942: Sunday Punch as Ken Burke
- 1942: Apache Trail as Tom Folliard
- 1942: Northwest Rangers as James Kevin Gardiner
- 1942: Andy Hardy's Double Life as Jeff Willis
- 1943: Dr. Gillespie's Criminal Case as Alvin F. Peterson
- 1943: Salute to the Marines as Rufus Cleveland
- 1943: Headin' for God's Country as Michael Banyan
- 1947: The Fabulous Dorseys as Bob Burton
- 1947: Dishonored Lady as Jack Garet
- 1948: The Inside Story as Waldo 'Bill' Williams
- 1948: Mystery in Mexico as Steve Hastings
- 1949: State Department: File 649 as Ken Seely
- 1949: Follow Me Quietly as Police Lt. Harry Grant
- 1949: Pinky as Dr. Thomas Adams
- 1950: Mother Didn't Tell Me as Dr. William Wright
- 1950: I'll Get By as William Spencer
- 1951: I'd Climb the Highest Mountain as Rev. William Asbury Thompson
- 1951: The House on Telegraph Hill as Major Marc Bennett
- 1951: Love Nest as Jim Scott
- 1951: Elopement as Matt Reagan
- 1953: Down Among the Sheltering Palms as Capt. W.W. 'Bill' Willoby
- 1953: Serpent of the Nile as Lucilius
- 1953: Lux Video Theatre (TV Series) as Jim
- 1953: Inferno as Joseph Duncan
- 1953–1954: Ford Television Theatre (TV Series) as Nels Wolcott / Bart Sayer
- 1954: Riders to the Stars as Dr. Richard Stanton
- 1954: Schlitz Playhouse of Stars (TV Series) as Jack Fuller
- 1954: General Electric Theater (TV Series) as Charlie
- 1954: Dangerous Voyage as Peter Duncan
- 1954: Shower of Stars (TV Series) as Host
- 1954: The White Orchid as Robert Burton
- 1954–1958: Climax! (TV Series) as Himself - Host
- 1955: Fireside Theatre (TV Series) as Sam Weston
- 1955: The Star and the Story (TV Series) as Edward Mansell
- 1955: Science Fiction Theatre (TV Series) as Maj. Fred Gunderman
- 1958: Playhouse 90 (TV Series) as Ben Gammon
- 1958: Westinghouse Desilu Playhouse (TV Series) as David Pierce
- 1959–1960: Men Into Space (TV Series) as Col. Edward McCauley
- 1961: Death Valley Days (TV Series) as Nathaniel Norgate
- 1962: The Underwater City as Bob Gage
- 1963: The Dick Powell Theatre (TV Series) as Frank Jeffers
- 1966: Run for Your Life (TV Series) as David Phillips
- 1967: The Way West as Michael Moynihan
- 1968: Where Angels Go, Trouble Follows as Mr. Clancy (uncredited)
- 1971: Medical Center (TV Series) as Willoughby
- 1971: Marcus Welby, M.D. (TV Series) as Jack Crowley (final appearance)
