= Is Everybody Happy? (1943 film) =

1943 film by Charles Barton

- Directed by: Charles Barton
- Written by: Monte Brice
- Produced by: Irving Briskin
- Starring: Ted Lewis; Michael Duane; Nan Wynn; Larry Parks
- Cinematography: L. William O'Connell
- Edited by: James Sweeney
- Music by: John Leipold
- Distributed by: Columbia Pictures
- Release date: October 28, 1943
- Running time: 73 minutes
- Country: US

Is Everybody Happy? is an American black and white musical film released in 1943. The movie was in effect a biopic for Ted Lewis.

The taglines for the film were: "18 of the grand songs made famous by the High-Hatted Tragedian of Song", "A FAST-STEPPING MUSICAL JAMBOREE!", "GET HAPPY! – Here comes the sweetest show in town!" and "IT'S GAY IN A GREAT BIG WAY!".

== Cast ==
- Ted Lewis – Ted Lewis aka Tom Todd
- Michael Duane – Tom Todd
- Nan Wynn – Kitty O'Riley
- Larry Parks – Jerry Stewart
- Lynn Merrick – Ann
- Bob Stanton – Artie (as Bob Haymes)
- Dick Winslow – Joe
- Harry Barris – Bob
- Robert Stanford – Frank Stewart Jr.
- Fern Emmett – Mrs. Broadbelt, Landlady
- Eddie Kane – Salbin
- Ray Walker – Lou Merwin
- Anthony Marlowe – Carl Muller
- George Reed – Missouri

== Soundtrack ==
- "Am I Blue?"

Music by Harry Akst
Lyrics by Grant Clarke
Sung by Nan Wynn

- "Cuddle Up a Little Closer"

Music by Karl Hoschna
Lyrics by Otto Harbach

- "On the Sunny Side of the Street"

Music by Jimmy McHugh
Lyrics by Dorothy Fields

- "St. Louis Blues"

Written by W. C. Handy

- "It Had to Be You"

Music by Isham Jones
Lyrics by Gus Kahn

- "Chinatown, My Chinatown"

Music by Jean Schwartz
Lyrics by William Jerome

- "Way Down Yonder in New Orleans"

Music by Turner Layton
Lyrics by Henry Creamer

- "By the Light of the Silvery Moon"

Music by Gus Edwards
Lyrics by Edward Madden

- "When My Baby Smiles at Me"

Music by Bill Munro
Lyrics by Andrew Sterling and Ted Lewis

- "I Wonder Who's Kissing Her Now"

Music by Joseph E. Howard and Harold Orlob
Lyrics by William M. Hough and Frank R. Adams

- "Whispering"

Music by John Schonberger
Lyrics by Malvin Schonberger

- "Moonlight Bay"

Music by Percy Wenrich
Lyrics by Edward Madden

- "Put on Your Old Grey Bonnet"

Music by Percy Wenrich
Lyrics by Stanley Murphy

- "It's a Long, Long Way to Tipperary"

Music by Jack Judge
Lyrics by Harry Williams

- "Smiles"

Music by Lee S. Roberts
Lyrics by J. Will Callahan

- "Pretty Baby"

Music by Tony Jackson and Egbert Van Alstyne
Lyrics by Gus Kahn

- "I'm Just Wild About Harry"

Music by Eubie Blake
Lyrics by Noble Sissle

== See also ==
- Is Everybody Happy?
