= The Forgotten Woman (1939 film) =

- Theatrical release poster
- Directed by: Harold Young
- Screenplay by: Lionel Houser; Harold Buchman
- Story by: John Kobler
- Produced by: Edmund Grainger
- Starring: Sigrid Gurie; William Lundigan; Eve Arden; Donald Briggs; Donnie Dunagan; Elisabeth Risdon
- Cinematography: Stanley Cortez
- Edited by: Charles Maynard
- Production company: Universal Pictures
- Distributed by: Universal Pictures
- Release date: July 7, 1939
- Running time: 63 minutes
- Country: United States
- Language: English

The Forgotten Woman is a 1939 American drama film directed by Harold Young and written by Lionel Houser and Harold Buchman. The film stars Sigrid Gurie, William Lundigan, Eve Arden, Donald Briggs, Donnie Dunagan and Elisabeth Risdon. The film was released on July 7, 1939, by Universal Pictures.

== Plot ==
A gorgeous woman, who is forced to help gangsters in a robbery, is arrested as their accessory.

== Cast ==
- Sigrid Gurie as Anne Kennedy
- William Lundigan as Terrence Kennedy
- Eve Arden as Carrie Ashburn
- Donald Briggs as Dist. Atty. Burke
- Donnie Dunagan as Terry Kennedy Jr.
- Elisabeth Risdon as Margaret Burke
- Paul Harvey as Charles Courtenay
- Ray Walker as Marty Larkin
- Virginia Brissac as Mrs. Kimball
- Joe Downing as Johnny Bradshaw
- Norman Willis as Stu Mantle
- George Walcott as Frank Lockridge
- John Hamilton as Dr. May
