= Reckless Living (1938 film) =

Film directed by Frank McDonald

- Theatrical release poster
- Directed by: Frank McDonald
- Screenplay by: Charles Grayson
- Based on: Riders Up by Gerald Beaumont
- Produced by: Val Paul
- Starring: Robert Wilcox; Nan Grey; Jimmy Savo; William Lundigan; Frank Jenks; Harry Davenport
- Cinematography: Elwood Bredell
- Edited by: Frank Gross
- Music by: Score: Frank Skinner; Songs: Jimmy McHugh (music); Harold Adamson (lyrics)
- Production company: Universal Pictures
- Distributed by: Universal Pictures
- Release date: March 1, 1938
- Running time: 65 minutes
- Country: United States
- Language: English

Reckless Living is a 1938 American comedy film directed by Frank McDonald and written by Charles Grayson. It is based on the 1922 novel Riders Up by Gerald Beaumont. The film stars Robert Wilcox, Nan Grey, Jimmy Savo, William Lundigan, Frank Jenks and Harry Davenport. The film was released on March 1, 1938, by Universal Pictures.

== Plot ==
1938 comedy . About a boarding house full of horse racing enthusiasts.

== Cast ==
- Robert Wilcox as Danny Farrell
- Nan Grey as Laurie Andrews
- Jimmy Savo as Stuffy
- William Lundigan as Stanley Shaw
- Frank Jenks as Freddie
- Harry Davenport as 'General' Jeff
- May Boley as Mother Ryan
- Charles Judels as Harry Myron
- Harlan Briggs as 'Colonel' Harris
- Eddie "Rochester" Anderson as Dreamboat
