= Edward Gargan =

American actor (1902-1964)

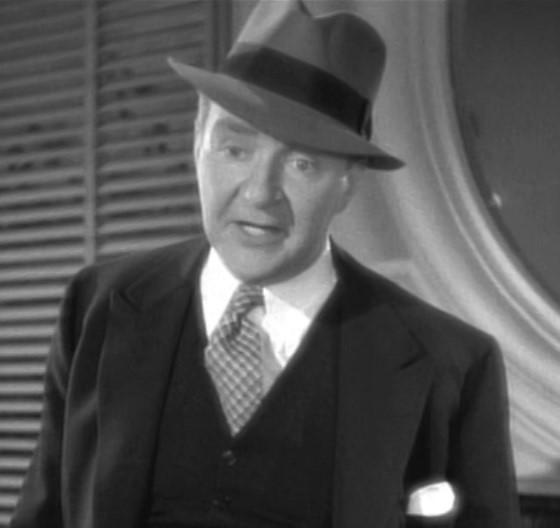
- Gargan in My Man Godfrey, 1936
- Born: July 17, 1902; New York City, U.S.
- Died: February 19, 1964 (aged 61); New York City, U.S.
- Occupation: Actor
- Years active: 1931–1953
- Spouse: Catherine Conlan (m. 1938)
- Relatives: William Gargan (brother)

Edward Gargan (July 17, 1902 – February 19, 1964) was an American film and television actor.

== Career ==
Gargan was born of Irish parents in Brooklyn, New York. He was the elder brother of actor William Gargan.

As soon as Gargan had left college, he went onto the stage and had extensive acting experience gained in plays like My Maryland, Rose Marie, and Good News before going into films. His Broadway credits include Face the Music (1931), Polly of Hollywood (1926) and Black Boy (1926).

In 1930, Gargan played Patrolman Mulligan in a production of Strictly Dishonorable.

Many of Gargan's appearances were uncredited.

== Personal life and death ==
Gargan was married to the former Catherine Conlan. He died February 19, 1964, at Columbus Hospital in New York City. He was 62. He is buried in Holy Cross Cemetery in Brooklyn, New York.

== Selected filmography ==
- Tarnished Lady (1931) – Al – Man in Bar (uncredited)
- The Girl Habit (1931) – Detective
- The Girl in 419 (1933) – Lt. 'Babs' Riley
- Gambling Ship (1933) – Deputy (uncredited)
- Pilgrimage (1933) – Marty – Reporter (uncredited)
- Mary Stevens, M.D. (1933) – 'Captain' the Policeman (uncredited)
- Three-Cornered Moon (1933) – Mike the Landlord (uncredited)
- Turn Back the Clock (1933) – Pete – Checkers Player (uncredited)
- Bombshell (1933) – Second Immigration Officer (uncredited)
- Ace of Aces (1933) – Whitaker – Mechanic (uncredited)
- Jimmy and Sally (1933) – Married Meatpacker (uncredited)
- Gallant Lady (1933) – Policeman on Street (uncredited)
- Queen Christina (1933) – Drinker (uncredited)
- Fugitive Lovers (1934) – Policeman (uncredited)
- David Harum (1934) – Bill Montague (uncredited)
- Good Dame (1934) – House Detective (uncredited)
- Three on a Honeymoon (1934) – Poker Player (uncredited)
- Registered Nurse (1934) – Officer Pat O'Brien
- Wild Gold (1934) – Eddie Sparks
- Side Streets (1934) – Cop (uncredited)
- She Was a Lady (1934) – Bull (uncredited)
- Belle of the Nineties (1934) – Stogie
- The Lemon Drop Kid (1934) – Sullivan (uncredited)
- She Had to Choose (1934) – Higgins
- Port of Lost Dreams (1934) – Porky the Freda's 'Crew'
- We Live Again (1934) – Warden's Assistant (uncredited)
- Behold My Wife! (1934) – Det. Connolly (uncredited)
- The Band Plays On (1934) – Lumberjack (uncredited)
- Bachelor of Arts (1934) – Policeman (uncredited)
- A Notorious Gentleman (1935) – Detective (uncredited)
- The Gilded Lily (1935) – Subway Guard
- One New York Night (1935) – Trench (uncredited)
- Behind the Green Lights (1935) – Moran – a Cop
- Hold 'Em Yale (1935) – Detective Kelly (uncredited)
- Ginger (1935) – Detective (uncredited)
- So Red the Rose (1935) – Cavalryman (uncredited)
- The Irish in Us (1935) – Tough Guy Slugged by Danny (uncredited)
- Man on the Flying Trapeze (1935) – Patrolman No.1
- We're in the Money (1935) – Policeman Clancy O'Rourke
- Two for Tonight (1935) – Taxi Driver (uncredited)
- Here Comes Cookie (1935) – Policeman (uncredited)
- Barbary Coast (1935) – Bill – Henchman (uncredited)
- Hands Across the Table (1935) – Pinky Kelly (uncredited)
- False Pretenses (1935) – Mike O'Reilly
- Miss Pacific Fleet (1935) – Shore Patrol Chief with Telephone (uncredited)
- The Bride Comes Home (1935) – Cab Driver
- Ceiling Zero (1936) – Doc Wilson
- Anything Goes (1936) – Detective
- Dangerous Waters (1936) – Bosun
- The Walking Dead (1936) – Guard Sitting Outside Warden's Office (uncredited)
- Sutter's Gold (1936) – Wagon Driver (uncredited)
- Boulder Dam (1936) – Pa's Guest (uncredited)
- Mr. Deeds Goes to Town (1936) – Bodyguard (uncredited)
- Roaming Lady (1936) – Andy
- Hearts in Bondage (1936) – 'Mac' McPherson
- Nobody's Fool (1936) – Tom
- A Son Comes Home (1936) – Second Truck Driver (uncredited)
- Grand Jury (1936) – Police Officer Tim Burke
- My Man Godfrey (1936) – Detective (uncredited)
- Stage Struck (1936) – Rordan
- Wives Never Know (1936) – Officer (uncredited)
- Valiant Is the Word for Carrie (1936) – (uncredited)
- Two in a Crowd (1936) – Policeman (uncredited)
- Wild Brian Kent (1936) – Joe – Waiter
- Under Your Spell (1936) – Detective (uncredited)
- Great Guy (1936) – Al
- We're on the Jury (1937) – Police Officer Clark
- The Great O'Malley (1937) – Policeman Driving Radio Car (uncredited)
- Nancy Steele Is Missing! (1937) – Guard (uncredited)
- When Love Is Young (1937) – Policeman (uncredited)
- The Man Who Found Himself (1937) – Policeman in Park (uncredited)
- Jim Hanvey, Detective (1937) – O.R. Smith
- You Can't Buy Luck (1937) – Butch (uncredited)
- The Go Getter (1937) – Police Officer Riley (uncredited)
- San Quentin (1937) – 'Captain' Road Gang Guard (uncredited)
- Wake Up and Live (1937) – Murphy, Tour Guide Supervisor
- High, Wide and Handsome (1937) – Foreman
- Big City (1937) – Policeman with Banana (uncredited)
- Back in Circulation (1937) – Policeman at Train Wreck (uncredited)
- Madame X (1937) – Mate of Dorcas (uncredited)
- That's My Story (1937) – John
- A Girl with Ideas (1937) – Eddie
- Danger Patrol (1937) – John Donovan
- Thoroughbreds Don't Cry (1937) – Park Policeman (uncredited)
- 45 Fathers (1937) – Policeman (uncredited)
- Wallaby Jim of the Islands (1937) – Buck Morgan
- Bringing Up Baby (1938) – Zoo Official (uncredited)
- Love on a Budget (1938) – Big Furniture Mover (uncredited)
- Goodbye Broadway (1938) – Bus Driver (uncredited)
- Crime School (1938) – Officer Hogan (credited as Ed Gargan)
- Rascals (1938) – Police Officer (uncredited)
- The Devil's Party (1938) – Police Sgt. Enders (uncredited)
- The Rage of Paris (1938) – Truck Driver (uncredited)
- Men Are Such Fools (1938) – 2nd Policeman in Car (uncredited)
- The Amazing Dr. Clitterhouse (1938) – Police Sergeant (uncredited)
- Gateway (1938) – Guard (uncredited)
- Keep Smiling (1938) – First Electrician (uncredited)
- The Texans (1938) – Sgt. Grady (uncredited)
- Give Me a Sailor (1938) – Chief Petty Officer (uncredited)
- Carefree (1938) – Policeman (uncredited)
- Time Out for Murder (1938) – Apartment Doorman (uncredited)
- Straight, Place and Show (1938) – Detective Globe
- Five of a Kind (1938) – Tim Kelly – Bartender (uncredited)
- Thanks for the Memory (1938) – Flanahan
- Annabel Takes a Tour (1938) – Longshoreman at Dance
- Spring Madness (1938) – Jim (uncredited)
- Up the River (1938) – Tiny
- Road Demon (1938) – Beefy Hogan (uncredited)
- While New York Sleeps (1938) – Police Sgt. White
- Newsboys' Home (1938) – Policeman (uncredited)
- Boy Trouble (1939) – Cop (uncredited)
- Honolulu (1939) – 2nd Detective
- Cafe Society (1939) – Cop (uncredited)
- Yes, My Darling Daughter (1939) – Police Officer
- Blondie Meets the Boss (1939) – Garden Café Doorman (uncredited)
- The Saint Strikes Back (1939) – Pinky Budd
- Winner Take All (1939) – Bettor (uncredited)
- The Family Next Door (1939) – Cop (uncredited)
- The Flying Irishman (1939) – Jim 'J.R.' Robinson (uncredited)
- Fixer Dugan (1939) – Jake
- For Love or Money (1939) – Bubbles
- Lucky Night (1939) – Policeman
- Boy Friend (1939) – Bugsie (uncredited)
- It Could Happen to You (1939) – Bartender (uncredited)
- They All Come Out (1939) – George Jacklin – 'Bugs'
- The Spellbinder (1939) – Tom – Taxi Driver (uncredited)
- Night Work (1939) – Police Officer Flannigan
- $1,000 a Touchdown (1939) – Ironmansky (uncredited)
- On Your Toes (1939) – First Policeman (uncredited)
- Pack Up Your Troubles (1939) – Sentry
- 20,000 Men a Year (1939) – Dunk
- Heaven with a Barbed Wire Fence (1939) – Truck Driver (uncredited)
- Another Thin Man (1939) – Detective Quinn (uncredited)
- A Child Is Born (1939) – Officer Riley – Police Guard (uncredited)
- Brother Rat and a Baby (1940) – Taxicab Driver
- Wolf of New York (1940) – W. Thornton Upshaw
- The Saint's Double Trouble (1940) – Police Sergeant (uncredited)
- Castle on the Hudson (1940) – Death Row Guard (uncredited)
- Northwest Passage (1940) – Capt. Butterfield (uncredited)
- Charlie Chan in Panama (1940) – Plant Workman (uncredited)
- Adventure in Diamonds (1940) – Lou
- Three Cheers for the Irish (1940) – Policeman O'Brien (uncredited)
- Road to Singapore (1940) – Bill – Sailor (uncredited)
- Johnny Apollo (1940) – Detective (uncredited)
- It All Came True (1940) – Police Desk Sergeant (uncredited)
- Two Girls on Broadway (1940) – Policeman Guarding Courtroom (uncredited)
- Buck Benny Rides Again (1940) – Policeman (uncredited)
- The Doctor Takes a Wife (1940) – George – Doorman (uncredited)
- An Angel from Texas (1940) – New York Policeman (uncredited)
- I Can't Give You Anything But Love, Baby (1940) – Policeman at Robbery (uncredited)
- Susan and God (1940) – Cabbie (uncredited)
- Queen of the Mob (1940) – Bank Guard
- Girl from God's Country (1940) – Poker Player #1
- Girl from Avenue A (1940) – First Doorman (uncredited)
- City for Conquest (1940) – Joe – Foreman (uncredited)
- Spring Parade (1940) – Inga – the Fortune Teller
- The Villain Still Pursued Her (1940) – Bartender (uncredited)
- Slightly Tempted (1940) – Gottlieb, Policeman (uncredited)
- Tugboat Annie Sails Again (1940) – Policeman (uncredited)
- Street of Memories (1940) – Mike Sullivan
- The Lone Wolf Keeps a Date (1940) – Chimp
- Go West (1940) – Railroad Ticket Seller (uncredited)
- This Thing Called Love (1940) – Police Officer (uncredited)
- The San Francisco Docks (1940) – Hank
- Bowery Boy (1940) – Mr. Hanson
- Four Mothers (1941) – Harry (uncredited)
- Tall, Dark and Handsome (1941) – Store Detective (uncredited)
- Flight from Destiny (1941) – Hotel Doorman (uncredited)
- Meet the Chump (1941) – Muldoon
- Here Comes Happiness (1941) – Joe
- Men of Boys Town (1941) – Detective Arresting Whitey (uncredited)
- Thieves Fall Out (1941) – Kane
- Affectionately Yours (1941) – Traffic Policeman (uncredited)
- Million Dollar Baby (1941) – Customs Officer (uncredited)
- Tight Shoes (1941) – Blooch
- Three Sons o' Guns (1941) – Sylvester, the Milkman (uncredited)
- Tillie the Toiler (1941) – Policeman
- Ice-Capades (1941) – Joe, the Bouncer (uncredited)
- Lady Be Good (1941) – Policeman (scenes deleted)
- Navy Blues (1941) – Hawaii Club Proprietor (uncredited)
- Niagara Falls (1941) – Chuck
- Ellery Queen and the Murder Ring (1941) – Dumb Henchman (uncredited)
- The Night of January 16th (1941) – Cop Who Helps the Drunk (uncredited)
- A Date with the Falcon (1942) – Detective Bates (uncredited)
- Fly-by-Night (1942) – Officer Charlie Prescott
- Dr. Kildare's Victory (1942) – Willie Brooks
- What's Cookin'? (1942) – Minor Role (uncredited)
- My Favorite Blonde (1942) – Mulrooney
- Meet the Stewarts (1942) – Moving Man
- Flying with Music (1942) – Joe
- The Falcon Takes Over (1942) – Detective Bates (uncredited)
- Miss Annie Rooney (1942) – Policeman (uncredited)
- Ten Gentlemen from West Point (1942) – Bombardier (uncredited)
- They All Kissed the Bride (1942) – Private Policeman
- Lady in a Jam (1942) – Deputy
- Blondie for Victory (1942) – Sergeant
- A-Haunting We Will Go (1942) – Police Lt. Foster
- Between Us Girls (1942) – Cab Driver (uncredited)
- My Sister Eileen (1942) – Murphy – Policeman (uncredited)
- The Falcon's Brother (1942) – Detective Bates
- Mrs. Wiggs of the Cabbage Patch (1942) – Doorman (uncredited)
- My Heart Belongs to Daddy (1942) – Mr. Johnson – Detective (uncredited)
- Over My Dead Body (1942) – Police Sergeant
- Andy Hardy's Double Life (1942) – Motorcycle Policeman (uncredited)
- The Meanest Man in the World (1943) – Hotel Detective (uncredited)
- Something to Shout About (1943) – Detective Stone (uncredited)
- They Got Me Covered (1943) – Cop at Bridge (uncredited)
- Prairie Chickens (1943) – Bus Driver (uncredited)
- The Falcon Strikes Back (1943) – Detective Bates
- Tahiti Honey (1943) – George, the Bartender
- Taxi, Mister (1943) – Willie, Court Bailiff / Cabby / Ballplayer (uncredited)
- Hit the Ice (1943) – Bank Policeman (uncredited)
- The Falcon in Danger (1943) – Detective Bates
- The West Side Kid (1943) – Donovan
- Thank Your Lucky Stars (1943) – Doorman (uncredited)
- Princess O'Rourke (1943) – Slugged Pedestrian (uncredited)
- My Kingdom for a Cook (1943) – Duke
- The Falcon and the Co-eds (1943) – Detective Bates
- In Old Oklahoma (1943) – Kelsey – Waiter (uncredited)
- The Falcon Out West (1944) – Detective Bates
- The Great Alaskan Mystery (1944, Serial) – Kurtz [Chs. 4–13]
- Once Upon a Time (1944) – Cop Outside Flynn Theater (uncredited)
- Detective Kitty O'Day (1944) – Mike
- Song of the Open Road (1944) – Poultry Truck Driver (uncredited)
- San Fernando Valley (1944) – Keno
- San Diego, I Love You (1944) – Policeman (uncredited)
- The Thin Man Goes Home (1944) – Mickey Finnegan (uncredited)
- Music for Millions (1944) – Detective (uncredited)
- High Powered (1945) – Cal Williams
- See My Lawyer (1945) – Furniture Mover (uncredited)
- Earl Carroll Vanities (1945) – Policeman
- It's in the Bag! (1945) – Chair Delivery Man (uncredited)
- Diamond Horseshoe (1945) – Grogan – Stagehand (uncredited)
- The Bullfighters (1945) – Vasso – Man Practicing Speech (uncredited)
- The Great John L. (1945) – (scenes deleted)
- Twice Blessed (1945) – Outraged Baseball Fan (uncredited)
- That's the Spirit (1945) – Cop (uncredited)
- A Sporting Chance (1945) – Mike Ryan
- Dangerous Partners (1945) – Police Sgt. at Kempen's Apartment (uncredited)
- Wonder Man (1945) – Policeman in Park
- The Naughty Nineties (1945) – Baxter – Saloon Bartender (uncredited)
- The Beautiful Cheat (1945) – Blue Moon Manager
- Guest Wife (1945) – Waiter (uncredited)
- Her Highness and the Bellboy (1945) – 1st Cop
- Sing Your Way Home (1945) – Jailer
- She Wouldn't Say Yes (1945) – Cab Driver (uncredited)
- Life with Blondie (1945) – Dogcatcher (uncredited)
- Follow That Woman (1945) – Butch
- Pardon My Past (1945) – Policeman at Pemberton Home (uncredited)
- Gay Blades (1946) – Bartender
- Deadline at Dawn (1946) – Bouncer (uncredited)
- Little Giant (1946) – Policeman (uncredited)
- Cinderella Jones (1946) – Riley
- Blonde Alibi (1946) – Police Sergeant (uncredited)
- Behind the Mask (1946) – Detective Dixon
- The Dark Horse (1946) – Eustace Kelly
- The Inner Circle (1946) – Parking Ticket Cop
- Faithful in My Fashion (1946) – Cop (scenes deleted)
- Crack-Up (1946) – Cop in Arcade (uncredited)
- The Brasher Doubloon (1947) – Truck Driver (uncredited)
- The Ghost Goes Wild (1947) – Newsstand Man
- It Happened on Fifth Avenue (1947) – Policeman in Park (uncredited)
- That's My Gal (1947) – Mike
- Saddle Pals (1947) – Jailer
- Web of Danger (1947) – Dolan, Restaurant Owner
- Little Miss Broadway (1947) – Uncle George
- The Trouble with Women (1947) – Mr. Fogarty (uncredited)
- Exposed (1947) – Big Mac
- Linda, Be Good (1947) – Frankie
- Campus Honeymoon (1948) – Motorcycle Cop
- Scudda Hoo! Scudda Hay! (1948) – Ted (uncredited)
- Are You with It? (1948) – Spectator (uncredited)
- Smart Woman (1948) – Interrogator at Police Line-Up (uncredited)
- The Dude Goes West (1948) – Train Conductor
- Waterfront at Midnight (1948) – Minor Role (uncredited)
- The Babe Ruth Story (1948) – Policeman (uncredited)
- Daredevils of the Clouds (1948) – Tap–It Bowers
- A Southern Yankee (1948) – Male Nurse (scenes deleted)
- You Gotta Stay Happy (1948) – Detective (uncredited)
- Strike It Rich (1948) – Mack – the Bartender
- Adventures of Gallant Bess (1948) – Deputy
- Blondie's Secret (1948) – The Butcher (uncredited)
- Hold That Baby! (1949) – Burton – Policeman
- Mighty Joe Young (1949) – Bar Patron (uncredited)
- That Midnight Kiss (1949) – Traffic Cop (uncredited)
- Love Happy (1949) – Cop Who Captures Harpo (uncredited)
- Feudin' Rhythm (1949) – Fire Chief (uncredited)
- Key to the City (1950) – S.F. Cop – Fire Escape (uncredited)
- The Kid from Texas (1950) – Blacksmith (uncredited)
- Belle of Old Mexico (1950) – Sam
- Square Dance Katy (1950) – Police Officer Casey
- Father of the Bride (1950) – Moving Man with Door (uncredited)
- Triple Trouble (1950) – Police Officer Murphy
- Hit Parade of 1951 (1950) – Garrity
- Valentino (1951) – Cop in Central Park (uncredited)
- Bedtime for Bonzo (1951) – Policeman Bill
- Cuban Fireball (1951) – Ritter
- Abbott and Costello Meet the Invisible Man (1951) – Milt (uncredited)
- Little Egypt (1951) – Police Sergeant (uncredited)
