= Fay Helm =

American actress (1909–2003)

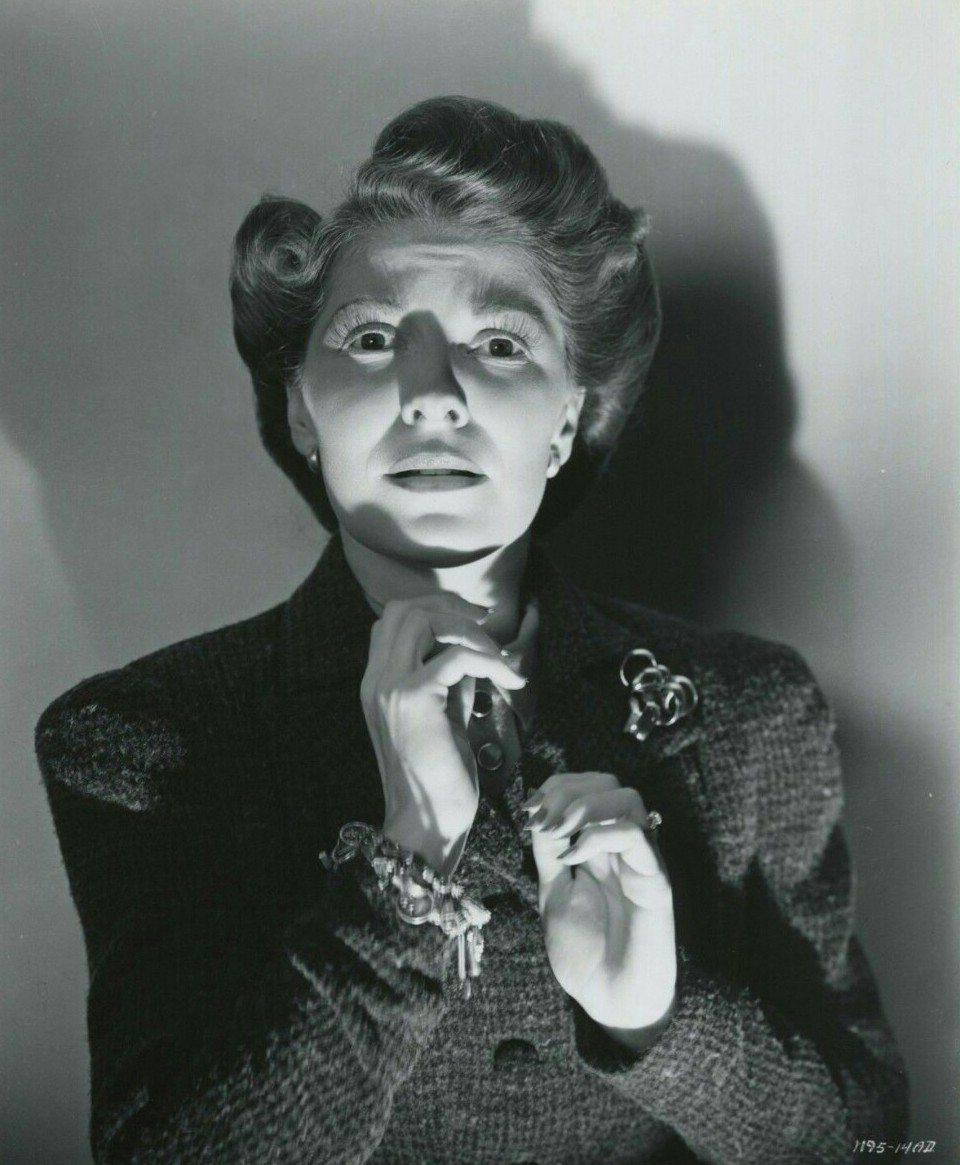
- Born: April 9, 1909; Bakersfield, California, U.S.
- Died: September 27, 2003 (aged 94); Santa Monica, California, U.S.
- Education: University of Oregon
- Occupation: Actress
- Years active: 1936-1946
- Spouses: Norman Main (m. 19??; div. 1940) Jack Hardy (m. 1941; div. 194?); Albert O. Farmer (m. 1947; died 1957)
- Children: 1

Fay Helm (April 9, 1909 – September 27, 2003) was an American film actress. Born in Bakersfield, California, she appeared in about 65 films between 1936 and 1946. She is perhaps better known for films like A Child is Born (1939), The Wolf Man (1941 film) (1941), Phantom Lady (1944), Lady in the Dark (1944) and Sister Kenny (1946).

== Early years ==
Helm was the daughter of Mr. and Mrs. L.G. Helm of Bakersfield, California. Her father was "a widely known oil operator" in Bakersfield. She participated in drama as a student at the University of Oregon and acted in productions at The Portland Civic Theatre. She also acted in the Bakersfield Community Theatre. Helm came to Hollywood in 1936 at the age of 22.

== Personal life and death ==
Helm married attorney Jack Hardy February 15, 1941. Before that, she was married to assistant district attorney Norman Main. She and Main divorced in 1940. She died on September 27, 2003, and was buried on October 15, 2003, in The Holy Cross Cemetery Culver City Los Angeles County, California, Section Y, Tier 12, Grave 54.

== Film credits ==
- Fury (1936) - Townswoman (uncredited)
- San Francisco (1936) - Earthquake Survivor (uncredited)
- Under Cover of Night (1937) - Maggie - Janet's Maid (uncredited)
- Song of the City (1937) - Marge
- A Girl with Ideas (1937) - Genevieve (uncredited)
- Merry-Go-Round of 1938 (1937) - Dainty Doris
- Midnight Intruder (1938) - Marion Loring (uncredited)
- Racket Busters (1938) - Mrs. Smith
- I Am the Law (1938) - Mrs. Butler
- Blondie (1938) - Mrs. Fuddle (uncredited)
- Peck's Bad Boy with the Circus (1938) - Mrs. De Cava
- Sergeant Madden (1939) - Nurse (uncredited)
- Dark Victory (1939) - Miss Dodd
- They All Come Out (1939) - Mamie Jacklin (uncredited)
- Our Leading Citizen (1939) - Tonia
- Hollywood Cavalcade (1939) - Nurse (uncredited)
- Blondie Brings Up Baby (1939) - Mrs. Fuddle
- A Child Is Born (1939) - The Woman
- The Light That Failed (1939) - Red-Haired Girl (uncredited)
- Abe Lincoln in Illinois (1940) - Mrs. Seth Gale (uncredited)
- Parole Fixer (1940) - Rita Mattison
- Blondie on a Budget (1940) - Mrs. Fuddle
- Little Orvie (1940) - Mrs. Balliser
- Women Without Names (1940) - Millie
- Dr. Kildare's Strange Case (1940) - Mrs. Henry Adams
- Untamed (1940) - Miss Olcott
- Blondie Has Servant Trouble (1940) - Mrs. Fuddle
- Dancing on a Dime (1940) - Miss Greenfield
- Life with Henry (1940) - Office Secretary (uncredited)
- Kitty Foyle (1940) - Prim Girl (uncredited)
- Ride, Kelly, Ride (1941) - Nurse (uncredited)
- The Wagons Roll at Night (1941) - Wife (uncredited)
- Million Dollar Baby (1941) - Mrs. Grayson
- The Hard-Boiled Canary (1941) - Miss Wilson
- Blossoms in the Dust (1941) - Leta Eldredge (adopting Tony) (uncredited)
- Two in a Taxi (1941) - Ethel
- The Wolf Man (1941) - Jenny
- Wings for the Eagle (1942) - Miss Baxter
- Give Out, Sisters (1942) - Susan Waverly
- Halfway to Shanghai (1942) - Marion Mills
- Night Monster (1942) - Margaret Ingston
- Life Begins at Eight-Thirty (1942) - Ruthie (uncredited)
- The Crystal Ball (1943) - Brad Cavanaugh's Secretary (uncredited)
- Young and Willing (1943) - Miss Harris (uncredited)
- Captive Wild Woman (1943) - Nurse Strand
- Hers to Hold (1943) - Hannah Gordon
- Honeymoon Lodge (1943) - Mrs. Mary Thomas (uncredited)
- Calling Dr. Death (1943) - Mrs. Duval
- Moonlight in Vermont (1943) - Lucy Meadows
- Phantom Lady (1944) - Ann Terry
- Ladies Courageous (1944) - WAVE (uncredited)
- Lady in the Dark (1944) - Miss Bowers
- Mademoiselle Fifi (1944) - The Manufacturer's Wife
- One Body Too Many (1944) - Estelle Hopkins
- A Song to Remember (1945) - Madame Chopin (uncredited)
- Son of Lassie (1945) - Joanna
- The Falcon in San Francisco (1945) - Doreen Temple
- Dangerous Intruder (1945) - Millicent
- Sister Kenny (1946) - Mrs. McIntyre
- The Locket (1946) - Mrs. Bonner
- That Brennan Girl (1946) - Helen, Ziggy's Neighbor (final film role)
