= Henry O'Neill =

American actor (1891–1961)

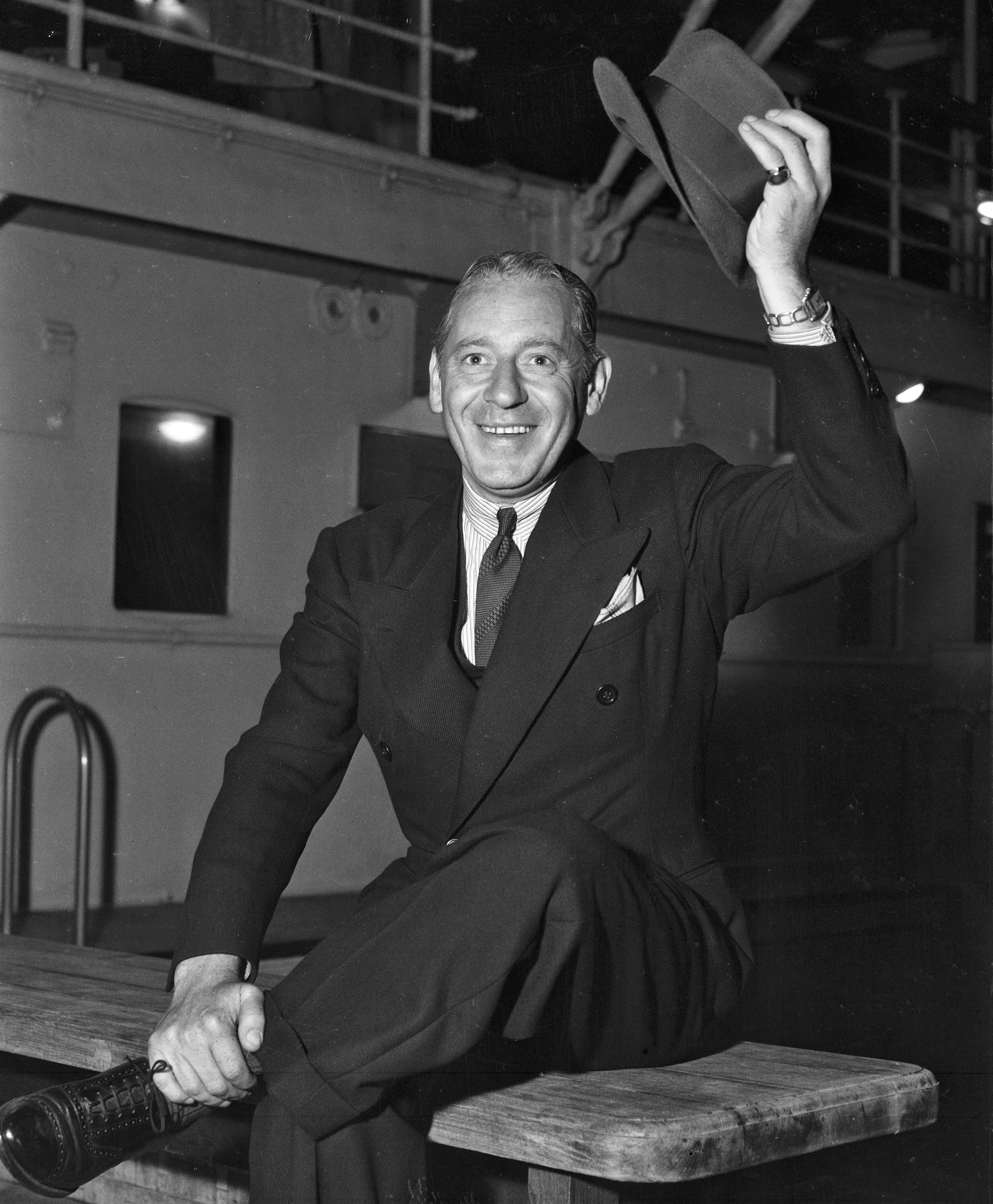
- O'Neill in 1936
- Born: August 10, 1891; Orange, New Jersey, U.S.
- Died: May 18, 1961 (aged 69); Hollywood, California, U.S.
- Resting place: San Fernando Mission Cemetery
- Occupation: Actor
- Years active: 1930–1957
- Spouse: Anna Barry (m. 1924)
- Children: 1

Henry O'Neill (August 10, 1891 – May 18, 1961) was an American actor known for playing gray-haired fathers, lawyers, and similarly dignified roles in over 175 movies between the 1930s and 1950s.

== Early life ==
Henry O'Neill was born in Orange, New Jersey on August 10, 1891 where he grew up before moving to Los Angeles, California. His grandparents came from Ireland to the United States. His education went through one year of college, after which he joined a stock theater troupe that went through his community.

== Career ==
O'Neill began his acting career on the stage, after dropping out of college to join a traveling theater company. He served in the Navy as a chief petty officer in World War I, after which he worked at several jobs, including being an usher in a funeral home. Eventually, he returned to the stage, joining a road show to tour the United States in 1919. His Broadway debut came in The Spring (1921), and his final Broadway appearance was in Shooting Star (1933). He also acted with the Provincetown Players and the Celtic Players.

In the early 1930s he began appearing in films, including The Big Shakedown (1934), the Western Santa Fe Trail (1940), the musical Anchors Aweigh (1945), The Green Years (1946), and The Reckless Moment (1949). His last film was The Wings of Eagles (1957), starring John Wayne.

An article in The New York Times said of O'Neill:

Whether he is playing a banker. lawyer or doctor, the quiet dignity of his characters, combined with forcefulness and a kind of directness, makes him akin to vast numbers of his wide audience. Even his appearance, as a slender, straight, conservatively dressed man with graying hair and aristocratic features, is true to the conservative, conventional type of American business man.

== Personal life ==
O'Neill was not related to Eugene O'Neill, but his first major Broadway role was Paddy in the latter's The Hairy Ape. The two men became good friends thereafter, and the actor performed in a number of the writer's plays.

He was on the board of directors of the Screen Actors Guild and has a star on the Hollywood Walk of Fame.

In 1924, O'Neill married Anna Barry. They had one child and remained wed until his death.

On May 18, 1961, O'Neill died in Hollywood, California, at the age of 69. His remains are interred at San Fernando Mission Cemetery in North Hollywood.

== Selected filmography ==
- I Loved a Woman (1933) as Mr. Farrell
- Ever in My Heart (1933) as Naturalization Judge (uncredited)
- The Kennel Murder Case (1933) as Dubois, Police Fingerprint Man (uncredited)
- From Headquarters (1933) as Inspector Donnelly
- The World Changes (1933) as Orin Nordholm Sr.
- Son of a Sailor (1933) as Naval Officer (uncredited)
- The House on 56th Street (1933) as Baxter, the Lawyer (uncredited)
- Lady Killer (1933) as Ramick
- The Big Shakedown (1934) as Mr. Sheffner
- Massacre (1934) as J.R. Dickinson
- Bedside (1934) as Dr. William Chester
- I've Got Your Number (1934) as John P. Schuyler
- Fashion Follies of 1934 (1934) as Duryea
- Wonder Bar (1934) as Richard, the Maitre'd
- Midnight (1934) as Ingersoll
- Journal of a Crime (1934) as Doctor
- Upper World (1934) as Banker Making Toast at banquet
- Twenty Million Sweethearts (1934) as Lemuel Tappan
- The Key (1934, aka High Peril) as Dan
- Fog Over Frisco (1934) as Porter
- The Personality Kid (1934) as Stephens
- Now I'll Tell (1934) as Tommy Doran
- Madame DuBarry (1934) as Duc de Choiseul
- Side Streets (1934) as George Richards
- Midnight Alibi (1934) as Jonathan Ardsley
- The Man with Two Faces (1934) as Inspector Crane
- Big Hearted Herbert (1934) as Goodrich Sr.
- Gentlemen Are Born (1934) as Mr. Harper
- Flirtation Walk (1934) as Gen. Fitts
- Murder in the Clouds (1934) as John Brownell
- The Secret Bride (1934) as Jim Lansdale
- The Man Who Reclaimed His Head (1934) as Fernand de Marnay
- Bordertown (1935) as Attorney J.L. Chase (uncredited)
- Sweet Music (1935) as Louis Trumble
- The Great Hotel Murder (1935) as Mr. Harvey
- Living on Velvet (1935) as Harold Thornton
- While the Patient Slept (1935) as Dimuck
- The Florentine Dagger (1935) as Victor Ballau
- Black Fury (1935) as Hendricks
- Alias Mary Dow (1935) as Henry Dow
- Dinky (1935) as Colonel Barnes
- Oil for the Lamps of China (1935) as Edward Hartford
- Stranded (1935) as Mr. Tuthill
- Bright Lights (1935) as J.C. Anderson
- We're in the Money (1935) as Lawyer Stephen 'Dinsy' Dinsmore
- Special Agent (1935) as District Attorney Roger Quinn
- The Case of the Lucky Legs (1935) as District Attorney Manchester
- Dr. Socrates (1935) as Greer
- Personal Maid's Secret (1935) as Mr. Wilton Palmer
- I Found Stella Parish (1935) as Trailer Narrator (voice, uncredited)
- Two Against the World (1936) as Jim Carstairs
- Freshman Love (1936) as Pres. Simpkins
- The Petrified Forest (1936) as Trailer Narrator (voice, uncredited)
- The Story of Louis Pasteur (1936) as Dr. Emile Roux
- Road Gang (1936) as George Winston
- The Walking Dead (1936) as District Attorney Werner
- Boulder Dam (1936) as Mr. Agnew
- The Golden Arrow (1936) as Mr. Appleby
- Bullets or Ballots (1936) as Ward Bryant
- The Big Noise (1936) as Charlie Caldwell
- The White Angel (1936) as Dr. Scott
- Anthony Adverse (1936) as Father Xavier
- Rainbow on the River (1936) as Father Josef
- Green Light (1937) as Dr. Endicott
- The Great O'Malley (1937) as Attorney for the Defense
- Marked Woman (1937) as District Attorney Arthur Sheldon
- Draegerman Courage (1937) as Dr. Thomas Haslett
- The Go Getter (1937) as Commander Tisdale
- The Singing Marine (1937) as Captain Skinner
- Mr. Dodd Takes the Air (1937) as D.M. Gateway
- The Life of Emile Zola (1937) as Colonel Georges Picquart
- Submarine D-1 (1937) as Admiral Thomas
- First Lady (1937) as George Mason
- Wells Fargo (1937) as Henry Wells
- The Great Garrick (1937)
- White Banners (1938) as Sam Trimble
- Gold Is Where You Find It (1938) as Judge
- Jezebel (1938) as General Theopholus Bogardus
- Yellow Jack (1938) as Gorgas
- Racket Busters (1938) as Governor
- The Amazing Dr. Clitterhouse (1938) as Judge
- The Chaser (1938) as Mr. Calhoun
- Girls on Probation (1938) as Judge
- Brother Rat (1938) as Colonel Ramm
- Torchy Blane in Chinatown (1939) as Senator Baldwin
- Wings of the Navy (1939) as Prologue Speaker
- Confessions of a Nazi Spy (1939) as Attorney Kellogg
- Dodge City (1939) as Col. Dodge
- The Man Who Dared (1939) as Matthew Carter
- Juarez (1939) as General Miguel Miramon
- Lucky Night (1939) as Calvin Jordan
- Sons of Liberty (1939, Short) as Member of Continental Congress
- Everybody's Hobby (1939) as Thomas 'Tom' Leslie
- The Angels Wash Their Faces (1939) as Remson Sr.
- A Child Is Born (1939) as Dr. Lee
- Four Wives (1939) as Dr. Clinton Forrest, Sr.
- Invisible Stripes (1939) as Parole Officer Masters
- The Fighting 69th (1940) as The Colonel
- Calling Philo Vance (1940) as Markham
- Dr. Ehrlich's Magic Bullet (1940) as Dr. Lentz
- Castle on the Hudson (1940) as District Attorney
- 'Til We Meet Again (1940) as Dr. Cameron
- They Drive by Night (1940) as District Attorney (uncredited)
- Money and the Woman (1940) as Mr. Mason
- Service with the Colors (1940, Short) as Col. Nelson
- Knute Rockne, All American (1940) as Doctor
- Santa Fe Trail (1940) as Cyrus Holliday
- Keeping Company (1940)
- Brother Rat and a Baby (1940)
- Maisie Was a Lady (1941) as Minor Role (scenes deleted)
- The Trial of Mary Dugan (1941) as Galway
- Men of Boys Town (1941) as Mr. Maitland
- Billy the Kid (1941) as Tim Ward
- The Get-Away (1941) as Warden Alcott
- Blossoms in the Dust (1941) as Judge
- Whistling in the Dark (1941) as Philip Post
- Down in San Diego (1941) as Col. Halliday
- Honky Tonk (1941) as Daniel Wells
- Shadow of the Thin Man (1941) as Maj. Jason I. Sculley
- Johnny Eager (1941) as Mr. Verne
- The Bugle Sounds (1942) as Lt. Col. Harry Seton
- Mr. and Mrs. North (1942) as Undetermined Role (scenes deleted)
- Born to Sing (1942) as Frank Eastman
- This Time for Keeps (1942) as Arthur Freeman
- Tortilla Flat (1942) as Father Ramon
- Pierre of the Plains (1942) as Undetermined Role (scenes deleted)
- White Cargo (1942) as The Reverend Dr. Roberts
- Stand By for Action (1942) as Cmdr. Stone M.C
- The Human Comedy (1943) as Charles Steed
- Air Raid Wardens (1943) as Rittenhause
- Dr. Gillespie's Criminal Case (1943) as Warden Kenneson
- Best Foot Forward (1943) as Maj. Reeber
- Thousands Cheer (1943) as Captain in Frank Morgan Skit (uncredited)
- Girl Crazy (1943) as Mr. Churchill Sr.
- Lost Angel (1943) as Professor Josh Pringle
- A Guy Named Joe (1943) as Col. Sykes
- Whistling in Brooklyn (1943) as Inspector Holcomb
- Main Street Today (1944, Short) as Vance Clark
- The Heavenly Body (1944) as Prof. Stowe
- Rationing (1944) as Sen. Edward A. White
- Two Girls and a Sailor (1944) as John Dyckman Brown II
- Barbary Coast Gent (1944) as Colonel Watrous
- Nothing but Trouble (1944) as Mr. Hawkley
- This Man's Navy (1945) as Lt. Cmdr. Roger Graystone
- Keep Your Powder Dry (1945) as Major General Lee Rand
- Between Two Women (1945) as Larry Goff, Theatrical Agent (uncredited)
- Dangerous Partners (1945) as Police Lt. Duffy
- Anchors Aweigh (1945) as Admiral Hammond
- The Hoodlum Saint (1946) as Lewis J. Malbery
- The Green Years (1946) as Canon Roche
- The Virginian (1946) as Mr. Taylor
- Bad Bascomb (1946) as Gov. Winton
- Little Mr. Jim (1946) as Chaplain
- Three Wise Fools (1946) as Prof. Horace Appleby
- The Beginning or the End (1947) as General Thomas F. Farrell
- The Return of October (1948) as President Hotchkiss
- Leather Gloves (1948) as Dudley
- Alias Nick Beal (1949) as Judge Hobson
- You're My Everything (1949) as Professor Adams
- Strange Bargain (1949) as Timothy Hearne
- The Reckless Moment (1949) as Tom Harper
- Holiday Affair (1949) as Mr. Crowley
- No Man of Her Own (1950) as Mr. Harkness
- The Second Woman (1950) as Ben Sheppard
- Convicted (1950) as Detective Dorn
- The Milkman (1950) as Roger Bradley Sr.
- The Flying Missile (1950) as RAdm. Thomas A. Scott
- The People Against O'Hara (1951) as Judge Keating
- The Family Secret (1951) as Donald Muir
- Scandal Sheet (1952) as Charlie Barnes
- Scarlet Angel (1952) as Morgan Caldwell
- The Sun Shines Bright (1953) as Joe D. Habersham
- Untamed (1955) as Squire O'Neill
- The Wings of Eagles (1957) as Capt. Spear
- North by Northwest (1959) as Man in Plaza Bar (uncredited) (final film role)
