= Racket Busters =

1938 film by Lloyd Bacon

- Directed by: Lloyd Bacon
- Screenplay by: Robert Rossen; Leonardo Bercovici
- Produced by: Samuel Bischoff
- Starring: Humphrey Bogart; George Brent; Gloria Dickson; Allen Jenkins; Walter Abel
- Cinematography: Arthur Edeson
- Edited by: James Gibbon
- Music by: Adolph Deutsch
- Production company: Cosmopolitan Productions
- Distributed by: Warner Bros. Pictures
- Release date: July 16, 1938
- Running time: 71 minutes
- Country: United States
- Language: English

Racket Busters is a 1938 American crime film directed by Lloyd Bacon. The film stars Humphrey Bogart and George Brent and is about a crime in the trucking industry.

== Plot ==
Attorney Hugh Allison is appointed Special Prosecutor to investigate and strike down gangster John "Czar" Martin's racketeering scheme in the trucking industry. This is Martin's first step in controlling New York's produce market. However, Alison is unable to get testimony from witnesses because of Martin's brutal coercion. Denny Jordan, a popular and influential trucker, refuses to join Martin's gang, and his truck is vandalized, causing Jordan to crash his truck on the side of a hill. To provide for his pregnant wife Nora, Jordan robs Martin's office but is caught. Martin agrees to forgive him if he joins his "protective association". Jordan reluctantly complies. This allows the other truckers to also join Martin's corrupt organization, while Allison begins jailing witnesses who refuse to testify. Jordan's oldest friend, Pop Wilson, is murdered after testifying against Martin, and Jordan's partner, "Skeets" Wilson, quits trucking and begins selling tomatoes. Although Jordan is arrested by Allison and his wife leaves him, he refuses to testify against Martin. In a move to control the entire produce market, Martin incites the truckers to go on strike, thereby causing a food shortage, until every commission merchant and produce dealer join his association. But, Wilson refuses Martin's entreaties and is killed by his gang. Jordan then leads the truckers into breaking the strike, and a free-for-all breaks out between the truckers and the racketeers. Jordan defeats Martin in a hand-to-hand fight as the police arrive. Denny eventually testifies against Martin, leading to his conviction.

== Cast ==
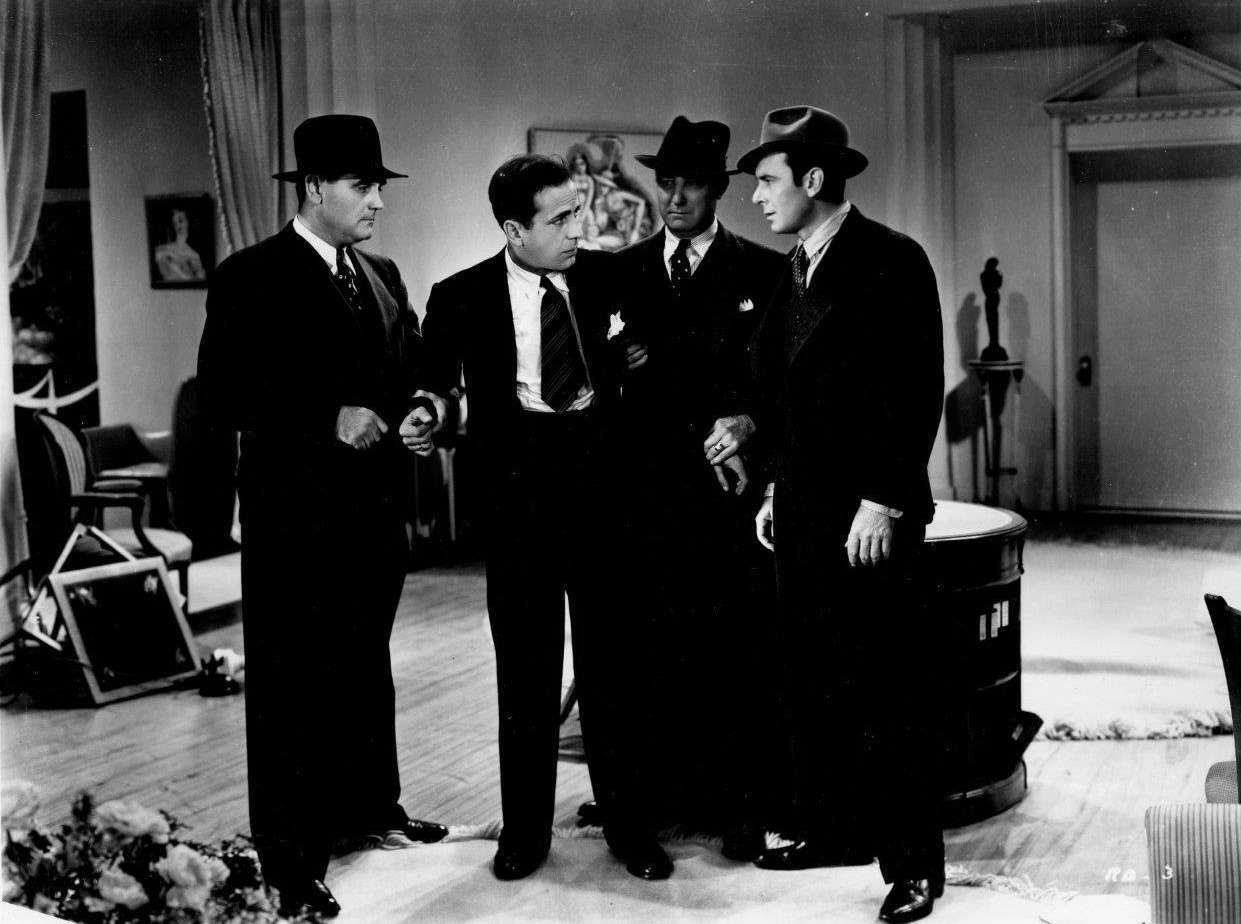
Humphrey Bogart and George Brent in Racket Busters

- Humphrey Bogart as John 'Czar' Martin
- George Brent as Denny Jordan
- Gloria Dickson as Nora Jordan
- Allen Jenkins as 'Skeets' Wilson
- Walter Abel as Hugh Allison
- Henry O'Neill as Governor
- Penny Singleton as Gladys Christie
- Anthony Averill as Dave Crane, Martin's Henchman
- Oscar O'Shea as Pop Wilson
- Elliott Sullivan as Charlie Smith
- Fay Helm as Mrs. Smith
- Joe Downing as Joe Pender, Martin's Henchman
- Norman Willis as Gus Hawkins, Martin's Henchman
- Don Rowan as Cliff Kimball

== Production ==
The film was based on the prosecution of real-life trucking racketeering schemes in New York City during Thomas E. Dewey's campaign against organized crime in the 1930s.

== Release ==
Racket Busters was released on July 16, 1938. According to the Hollywood Reporter the film's title was changed on its release in Paris to Threat Over the City so that the tennis fans would not think the film was about the sport.

== See also ==
- 1938 New York City truckers strike
