= Home Town Story =

1951 film by Arthur Pierson

- Theatrical release poster
- Directed by: Arthur Pierson
- Written by: Arthur Pierson
- Produced by: Arthur Pierson
- Starring: Jeffrey Lynn; Donald Crisp; Marjorie Reynolds; Marilyn Monroe; Alan Hale Jr.
- Cinematography: Lucien N. Andriot
- Edited by: William F. Claxton
- Music by: Louis Forbes; Alfred Newman
- Distributed by: Metro-Goldwyn-Mayer
- Release date: May 18, 1951
- Running time: 61 minutes
- Country: United States
- Language: English
- Box office: $334,000

Home Town Story is a 1951 American drama film written and directed by Arthur Pierson and starring Jeffrey Lynn, Donald Crisp, Marjorie Reynolds, Marilyn Monroe and Alan Hale Jr.

== Plot ==
Defeated politician Blake Washburn becomes the editor of a small-town newspaper in an effort to promote his reelection. His campaign is intended as a continuing exposé of the evils of large industry, and his strategy is to publish daily screeds against enormous corporate profits that enrich shareholders.

On a school outing to an abandoned mine, Washburn's younger sister is trapped in the collapse of a mine tunnel caused by a disgruntled employee's negligence, and the town's businesses come to her rescue. The sister is rescued, prompting Washburn to experience a change of heart and recognize that large corporations are necessary because "it takes bigness to do big things".

== Cast ==
- Jeffrey Lynn as Blake Washburn
- Donald Crisp as John MacFarland
- Marjorie Reynolds as Janice Hunt
- Alan Hale Jr. as Slim Haskins
- Marilyn Monroe as Iris Martin
- Barbara Brown as Mrs. Washburn
- Melinda Plowman as Katie Washburn
- Renny McEvoy as Leo, the taxi driver
- Glenn Tryon as Ken Kenlock
- Byron Foulger as Berny Miles
- Griff Barnett as Uncle Cliff Washburn
- Virginia Campbell as Phoebe Hartman
- Harry Harvey as Andy Butterworth
- Nelson Leigh as Dr. Johnson
- Speck Noblitt as motorcycle officer

== Reception ==
Critic Mildred Martin of The Philadelphia Inquirer called Home Town Story "a pleasant if suspiciously starry-eyed film".

According to MGM records, the film grossed $243,000 in the United States and Canada and $91,000 elsewhere, returning a profit of $195,000.
