= Lucky Night =

1939 American comedy film directed by Norman Taurog

- Theatrical release poster
- Directed by: Norman Taurog
- Screenplay by: Vincent Lawrence; Grover Jones
- Based on: Lucky Night; 1935 story in Collier's by Oliver Claxton
- Produced by: Louis D. Lighton
- Starring: Robert Taylor; Myrna Loy
- Cinematography: Ray June
- Edited by: Elmo Veron
- Music by: Franz Waxman
- Production company: Metro-Goldwyn-Mayer
- Distributed by: Loew's Inc.
- Release date: May 5, 1939
- Running time: 82 minutes
- Country: United States
- Language: English
- Budget: $589,000
- Box office: $1,080,000

Lucky Night (1939) is a comedy movie from MGM starring Robert Taylor and Myrna Loy, directed by Norman Taurog.

== Plot ==
Two people meet in a park, Cora, played by Myrna Loy, and William "Bill" Overton, played by Robert Taylor). They become acquainted and each discovers that the other is poor. Bill is authentically poor, homeless, and living in the park, while Cora is secretly an heiress looking to find love with a man who doesn't want her for her wealth. Neither having any money at the moment, they try to find 50 cents to eat, but a man complains to the police. They convince the policeman to give them 50 cents by saying that they are engaged (which they are not).

While walking, Bill drops the money without knowing it. When their bill at the diner comes to 50 cents, Bill suddenly realizes he must have lost it on the street. Another customer leaves a dime on the counter, Bill tells Cora to swipe it and put the dime in a slot machine hanging on the wall of the diner. Cora does so and hits the jackpot, with dozens of coins falling to the floor, which Bill and Cora gather eagerly. The two of them go to a casino, triumph in every game of chance they play, win a car in a raffle, and continue gambling and winning.

Later that night they get drunk, and the next morning wake up to find out they are married. When Cora tells her father of the impulsive marriage to the handsome but indigent drifter, he says "Cora, I tremble for your future. You're hooked with a poet who doesn't write." To prove him wrong, Bill quickly gets a job selling paint and they move into a modest apartment, living happily, frugally, and sensibly. Bill does well at his job, soon getting a raise. However, Bill becomes restless living so practically and, on a manic whim, quits his job. He announces to Cora that henceforth they should live full-time according to "The Idea"--i.e., existing recklessly on the edge, pursuing a "carpe diem" lifestyle, gambling, and "always celebrating--win, lose, or draw."

Cora considers "The Idea" philosophy foolish, inherently unstable, and impractical. Bill refuses to return to living a more settled, mundane lifestyle, so they separate, and Cora moves into the family mansion. One night Bill gets drunk, goes to Cora's house, and Bill and Cora's father become extremely inebriated together, singing, playing duets on the piano, and sharing contrasting life philosophies (Cora's father is practical and conservative; Bill is capricious and devil-may-care).

The next morning Cora approaches Bill, who is asleep and hungover in her childhood bed. Bill announces in a surly, dismissive manner that he'll be on his way soon, Cora replies "Isn't that fine? As if I didn't catch it enough from my old man last night. He said anyone who was related to him who couldn't appreciate you and 'The Idea' ought to be kicked out of the house bodily. Hmmph!" Bill asks where she was the night before, and she tells him she was "Eating my heart out for you. Not knowing where I might find you tomorrow. And here you are--in my own bed. Oh boy!" They share a passionate embrace, and that's the end.

== Credited cast ==
- Robert Taylor as William 'Bill' Overton
- Myrna Loy as Cora Jordan Overton
- Joseph Allen as Joe Hilton
- Henry O'Neill as H. Calvin Jordan, Cora's father
- Douglas Fowley as George, Bill's friend
- Bernard Nedall as 'Dusty' Sawyer
- Charles Lane as Mr. Carpenter, Paint Store Owner
- Bernadene Hayes as Blondie, Clerk at Carpenters
- Gladys Blake as Blackie, Clerk at Carpenters
- Marjorie Main as Mrs. Briggs, the Land Lady
- Edward Gargan as Police Man in Park
- Irving Bacon as Bus Conductor
- Oscar O'Shea as Lieutenant Murphy

== Box office ==
According to MGM records the film earned $716,000 in the US and Canada and $364,000 elsewhere resulting in a profit of $126,000.
