= Jeffrey Lynn =

American actor (1909–1995)

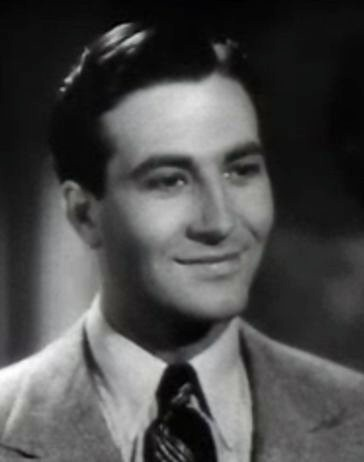
- Lynn in Four Daughters (1938)
- Born: Ragnar Godfrey Lind; February 16, 1909; Auburn, Massachusetts, U.S.
- Died: November 24, 1995 (aged 86); Burbank, California, U.S.
- Resting place: Forest Lawn Memorial Park; Hollywood Hills, California, U.S.
- Education: Bates College
- Occupations: Actor, film producer
- Years active: 1935–1990
- Spouses: Robin Chandler (m. 1946; div. 1958) Patricia Lynn (m. 1965; died 1974) Helen Lynn (m. 1986)

Jeffrey Lynn (born Ragnar Godfrey Lind; February 16, 1909 – November 24, 1995) was an American stage-screen actor and film producer who worked primarily through the Golden Age of Hollywood establishing himself as one of the premier talents of his time. Throughout his acting career, both on stage and in film, he was typecast as "the attractive, reliable love interest of the heroine," or "the tall, stalwart hero."

Born and raised in Massachusetts, he attended Bates College, before working as a teacher. He was tapped to act in his first film in 1938, which convinced him to move to Hollywood, California. His second film–Four Daughters (1938)–propelled him into national fame sparking two sequels: Four Wives (1939) and Four Mothers (1941), with Lynn reprising his role in each of them, along with Daughters Courageous (1939), which included the same cast but had a different storyline. He was at the center of the Gone with the Wind (1939) casting controversy: he was the top contender to play Ashley Wilkes but the director eventually chose Leslie Howard. Lynn was asked to join James Cagney and Humphrey Bogart in The Roaring Twenties (1939), a gangster noir that garnered him critical praise. His success continued with such films as The Fighting 69th (1940) in which he portrayed poet-soldier Joyce Kilmer opposite Cagney, It All Came True (1940), All This, and Heaven Too (1940) and Million Dollar Baby (1941).

His movie career was put on hold for World War II draft, where he received a Bronze Star for his service in Italy and Austria as a combat intelligence captain. He returned to the screen in 1948 and was in the popular A Letter to Three Wives (1949), which went on to be nominated for best picture in the 1950 prime time Academy Awards. A year later he joined that cast of Home Town Story (1951) billed alongside Marilyn Monroe. His later film career credits include: BUtterfield 8 (1960) along with Elizabeth Taylor and Laurence Harvey, and Tony Rome (1967) with Frank Sinatra.

Lynn also began to act on Broadway and was featured in such plays as Any Wednesday (1966) and Dinner at Eight (1967). Later on in his career he found mixed critical success television starring in hit shows such as Robert Montgomery Presents, Your Show of Shows, My Son Jeep (with young Martin Huston), and Lux Video Theatre.

He died in November 1995 in Burbank, California from natural causes and was buried at Forest Lawn Memorial Park in the Hollywood Hills. Actor Jeffrey Lynn "Jeff" Goldblum is named in honor of Jeffrey Lynn.

== Early life and education ==
Ragnar Godfrey Lind was born in Auburn, Massachusetts.

He attended Bates College in Lewiston, Maine and graduated in 1930 with a B.A. degree in education. While in college, he was a part of the secret society, Nova Scotia, and participated in the 1930 Penn Relays where he was part of the winning two-mile track & field relay team. His interest in acting developed in college.

At one time he intended to go into law school but decided to enter the workplace instead. He worked for the New England Telephone Co. and later taught English, speech and drama in high school, then decided to try acting as a career.

=== Theatre ===
Lynn started acting professionally at the Barter Theater in Abingdon, Virginia. He got small parts on Broadway and in road companies, supplementing his earnings with part-time jobs. including department store clerk, and movie usher.

Lynn was appearing in a production of Brother Rat in Chicago. He was spotted by a Warners talent scout and given a screen test. In January 1938 they signed him to a long-term contract.

== Film career ==
=== Early career and rise to fame: 1938–1941 ===
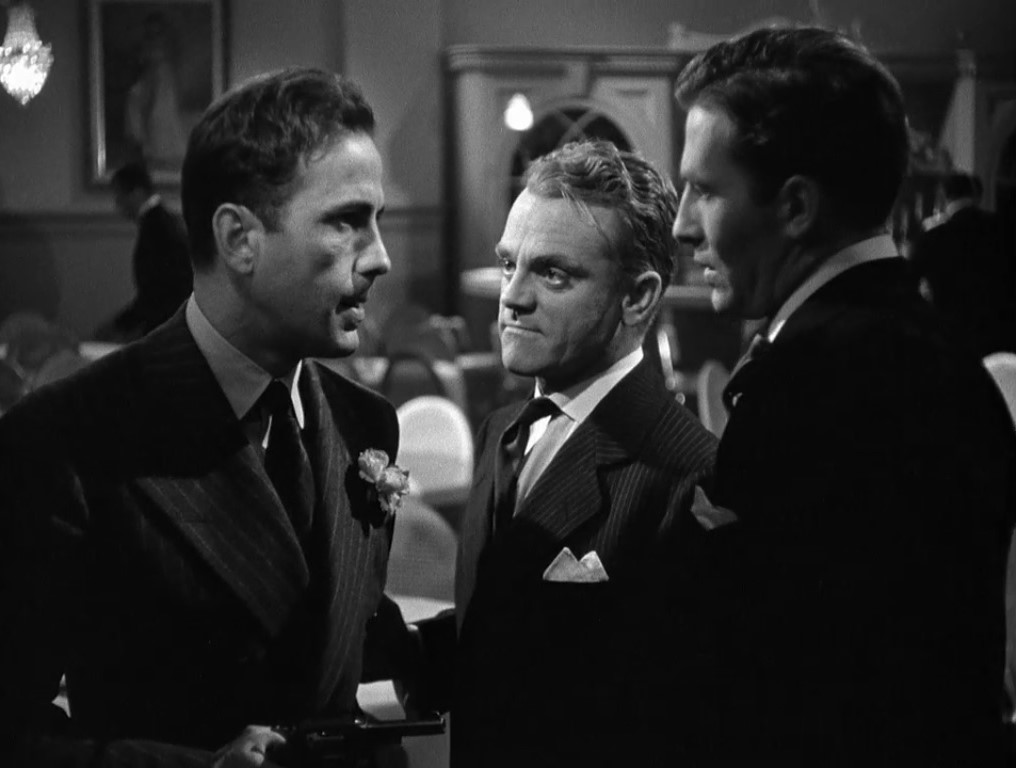
Humphrey Bogart, James Cagney, and Jeffrey Lynn in The Roaring Twenties (1939)

Lynn made his film debut in short Out Where the Stars Begin (1938). He had a supporting role in When Were You Born (1938) with Anna May Wong and a bit part in Cowboy from Brooklyn (1938) with Dick Powell.

In April 1938 Lynn was cast in a role originally turned down by Errol Flynn: one of the romantic male love interests in Four Daughters (1938) (first called Sister Act). Lynn appeared alongside the Lane Sisters, Claude Rains and John Garfield.

Lynn was promptly reteamed with Priscilla Lane in Yes, My Darling Daughter (1939) and then Daughters Courageous (1939), a film with the same director and stars as Four Daughters but a different storyline.

After the success of Four Daughters, Lynn was screen tested for the role of Ashley Wilkes in Gone with the Wind (1939). He was considered to be the front runner for the role, partly due to his physical resemblance to the character as written. Lynn was used extensively during the "Search for Scarlett" playing Ashley in the screen tests for many of the actresses who tried out for the part. David O. Selznick eventually cast the more experienced and popular Leslie Howard. It was during this time that he received typecasting as "the handsome romantic husband or boyfriend," "the attractive, reliable love interest of the heroine," and "the tall, stalwart hero."

Warners gave him the third lead in Espionage Agent (1939) alongside Joel McCrea and Brenda Marshall, and a lead role in The Roaring Twenties (1939), a gangster film that reunited him with Four Daughters star Priscilla Lane, as well as James Cagney and Humphrey Bogart. As one of a trio of friends, and the only one not to "go bad", Lynn won excellent reviews.

Lynn reprised his Four Daughters role in Four Wives (1939). He was the male lead in A Child Is Born (1939) co-starring with Geraldine Fitzgerald, and he was reunited with Cagney in The Fighting 69th (1940), though billed beneath Pat O'Brien and George Brent. He played poet-soldier Joyce Kilmer.

Lynn was Ann Sheridan's love interest in It All Came True (1940), battling Humphrey Bogart, and was third billed in All This, and Heaven Too (1940) with Bette Davis and Charles Boyer. Lynn was Olivia de Havilland's leading man in My Love Came Back (1940), replacing George Brent.

He was top billed in Money and the Woman (1940), a crime drama with Brenda Marshall. Lynn did a second sequel to Four Daughters, Four Mothers (1941), and was reunited with Fitzgerald in Flight from Destiny (1941).

Lynn was offered a role in Singapore (also Jinx Woman) but turned it down and was put on suspension. It was lifted in December 1940 when he agreed to make Miss Pinkerton with Fitzgerald.

He starred in Million Dollar Baby (1941) with Priscilla Lane and Ronald Reagan, was top billed in the war film Underground (1941), and was Constance Bennett's leading man in Law of the Tropics (1941). He was tested for the lead in Kings Row but the studio cast Robert Cummings.

Lynn's final film before entering the Air Corps was the comedy The Body Disappears (1941), with Jane Wyman; Lynn was top billed. In 1941, Lynn was voted 7th in the "Top Ten Stars of Tomorrow" two spots behind then-actor and future U.S. President Ronald Reagan.

=== Service in WWII & critical acclaim: 1941–1948 ===
His movie career was interrupted by service during World War II, with Lynn joining the United States Army Air Forces in February 1942. He served with a bomber unit and in May 1945 was promoted to captain. Lynn earned a bronze star as a combat intelligence captain in Italy and Austria, and was discharged in 1946 as Special Intelligence Officer.

While in service, Lynn often worked as a bartender in his unit's Officer's Club.

He legally changed his name to his stage name while in service, as he noted "that he wanted to serve his country during World War II under the name that had become popular."

Lynn returned to Hollywood in November 1946. In April 1947, Lynn was about to begin work on his first post-war picture when he was in a car accident with his first wife at the Donner Pass while coming back from a ski trip. That same year, he signed with Columbia to make Let's Fall in Love, but the picture was made as Slightly French without him.

=== Return to filmmaking: 1948–1970 ===
He returned to the screen in 1948 with Black Bart (1948) at Universal, supporting Yvonne De Carlo and Dan Duryea, stepping into a role intended for Edmond O'Brien. At the same studio he was one of Deanna Durbin's leading men in For the Love of Mary (1948) then returned to Warners for Whiplash (1948), where he was billed beneath Dane Clark, Alexis Smith and Zachary Scott.

Lynn had a decent part in A Letter to Three Wives (1949) at 20th Century Fox, playing the husband of Jeanne Crain. At RKO he was Martha Scott's leading man in Strange Bargain (1949), a role originally meant for Pat O'Brien.

Lynn then supported John Payne and Gail Russell in Captain China (1950) for Pine-Thomas Productions. In 1950 he was announced for the lead in Forty Notches but it appears to have not been made.

=== Television ===
Lynn made his television debut in an episode of Suspense (1949) and an adaptation of Miracle in the Rain for Studio One in Hollywood (1950) under the direction of Franklin J. Schaffner. He went on to appear in episodes of Lights Out, Faith Baldwin Romance Theatre, Cameo Theatre, Lux Video Theatre, The Clock, and Family Theatre.

Lynn had a support role in Up Front (1951) and the lead in Home Town Story (1951).

He appeared on Broadway in The Long Days (1951) which only ran three performances, and Lo and Behold! (1951–52) which ran for 38 performances under the direction of Burgess Meredith.

Lynn guest starred on episodes of Schlitz Playhouse, Tales of Tomorrow, The Philco-Goodyear Television Playhouse, Checkmate (a TV movie), Goodyear Playhouse, Philip Morris Playhouse, Suspense again, The Elgin Hour, Danger, Robert Montgomery Presents, Justice, and Appointment with Adventure. He had a recurring role in a series My Son Jeep (1953) which only ran 11 episodes. He worked extensively in summer stock.

Lynn returned to features with Lost Lagoon (1957) and was in The United States Steel Hour. In 1957 he appeared in Arms and the Man in Michigan.

=== Later television, film, and broadway work: 1960–1990 ===
In 1960, he starred in BUtterfield 8 (1960) along with Elizabeth Taylor and Laurence Harvey.

He was in Play of the Week and a 1961 adaptation of The Spiral Staircase. He did A Call on Kuprin (1961) on Broadway which ran for 12 performances.

In 1966 he joined the cast of the long-running Any Wednesday (1966) to mixed reception.

In 1967–68 he appeared on the TV show The Secret Storm.

In 1966 he went back to Broadway to act in Dinner at Eight (1967), directed by Tyrone Guthrie which ran for 127 performances.

Later in the year he received a call from the director of Tony Rome (1967), asking him to star in the movie. Lynn initially declined the offer in pursuit of side projects but came around after the director brought on Frank Sinatra.

Soon after his film with Sinatra, Lynn decided to go back into television beginning with Ironside (1969) as Professor Halstead and The Bold Ones: The New Doctors (1969) as Thomas Cleary.

In 1971 he appeared on The Edge of Night.

In 1973, he appeared on Barnaby Jones as himself. In 1975, he moved to Tarzana, California to be closer to production studios.

In 1982, he played the lead role in Forbidden Love as Dr. Brinkley an appeared in The Diary of Anne Frank on stage in Los Angeles.

He starred in two episodes of Simon & Simon as Perkins Oliphant in 1983. In 1985, he established himself as an actor and producer at the Los Angeles' Center Theater. A year later he produced The Diary of Anne Frank at the Centre in 1986.

In 1987, Lynn starred in an unusual episode of the TV mystery series Murder, She Wrote. The episode, entitled “The Days Dwindle Down,” was a sequel to the 1949 feature film Strange Bargain, in which he had also starred, with a slight reimagining of the original plot. Once again, Lynn played the role of "Sam Wilson", and his original co-stars, Martha Scott, and Harry Morgan also reprised their roles.

In 1990, he played Ambrose McGee in the television series, Midnight Caller and starred in Knots Landing as Mr. Ahern.

== Personal life ==
Lynn married his first wife Robin Chandler in 1946 and divorced in 1958. He married his second wife Patricia, in 1965; she died in 1974. He married Helen in 1986, and they remained married until his death.

== Death ==
Lynn died at St. Joseph's Hospital in Burbank, California, aged 89, and was buried in Forest Lawn Memorial Park in Los Angeles.

His New York Times obituary cited him as "the handsome leading man in a string of Warner Brothers films." Denis Gifford of The Independent noted that "his good looks and sincere playing won him a place in the memories of all film fans of Hollywood's golden age."

== Filmography ==
Year	Film	Role	Director	Notes
1938	Out Where the Stars Begin			Short
1938	When Were You Born	Reporter Davis	William C. McGann	Gemini
1938	Cowboy from Brooklyn	Chronicle Reporter	Lloyd Bacon	
1938	Four Daughters	Felix Deitz	Michael Curtiz	
1939	Yes, My Darling Daughter	Douglas Hall	William Keighley	
1939	Daughters Courageous	John S. 'Johnny' Heming	Michael Curtiz	
1939	Espionage Agent	Lowell Warrington	Lloyd Bacon	
1939	The Roaring Twenties	Lloyd Hart	Raoul Walsh	
1939	A Child Is Born	Jed Sutton	Lloyd Bacon	
1939	Four Wives	Felix Dietz	Michael Curtiz	
1940	The Fighting 69th	Joyce Kilmer	William Keighley	
1940	It All Came True	Tommy Taylor	Lewis Seiler	
1940	All This, and Heaven Too	Henry Martyn Field	Anatole Litvak	
1940	My Love Came Back	Tony Baldwin	Curtis Bernhardt	
1940	Money and the Woman	Dave Bennett	William K. Howard	Bennet in Newspaper Story
1941	Four Mothers	Felix Deitz	William Keighley	
1941	Flight from Destiny	Michael Farroway	Vincent Sherman	
1941	Million Dollar Baby	James Amory	Curtis Bernhardt	
1941	Underground	Kurt Franken	Vincent Sherman	
1941	Law of the Tropics	Jim Conwoy	Ray Enright	
1941	The Body Disappears	Peter DeHaven	D. Ross Lederman	
1948	Black Bart	Lance Hardeen	George Sherman	
1948	For the Love of Mary	Phillip Manning	Frederick de Cordova	
1948	Whiplash	Dr. Arnold Vincent	Lewis Seiler	
1949	A Letter to Three Wives	Brad Bishop	Joseph L. Mankiewicz	
1949	Strange Bargain	Sam Wilson	Will Price	
1950	Captain China	Capt. George Brendensen	Lewis R. Foster	
1951	Up Front	Capt. Ralph Johnson	Alexander Hall	
1951	Home Town Story	Blake Washburn	Arthur Pierson	
1953	Checkmate			TV movie
1953	Main Street to Broadway	First Nighter	Tay Garnett	Uncredited
1954	Doorway to Suspicion	Paul Stapleton		
1957	Lost Lagoon	Charlie Walker		
1960	BUtterfield 8	Bingham Smith	Daniel Mann	
1961	The Spiral Staircase	Doctor Parry		TV movie
1967	Tony Rome	Adam Boyd	Gordon Douglas	
