= Yes, My Darling Daughter (film) =

1939 film by William Keighley

- Directed by: William Keighley
- Screenplay by: Casey Robinson
- Based on: Yes, My Darling Daughter; 1937 play by Mark Reed
- Produced by: Hal B. Wallis
- Starring: Priscilla Lane; Jeffrey Lynn
- Cinematography: Charles Rosher
- Edited by: Ralph Dawson
- Music by: Heinz Roemheld
- Distributed by: Warner Bros. Pictures
- Release date: February 25, 1939
- Running time: 86 minutes
- Country: United States
- Language: English

Yes, My Darling Daughter is a 1939 American screwball comedy film directed by William Keighley and starring Priscilla Lane. Ellen Murray (Lane) is a young woman determined to spend a weekend with her lover, Douglas Hall (Jeffrey Lynn) before he takes off to Europe for his new job.

== Cast ==
- Priscilla Lane as Ellen Murray
- Jeffrey Lynn as Douglas 'Doug' Hall
- Roland Young as Titus 'Jay' Jaywood
- Fay Bainter as Ann 'Annie' Murray
- May Robson as Granny Whitman
- Genevieve Tobin as Aunt Connie Nevins
- Ian Hunter as Lewis Murray
- Robert Homans as Police Sergeant Murphy
- Edward Gargan as Dayfield Motorcycle Policeman
- Spencer Charters as Angus Dibble
- Lottie Williams as Martha, the Maid
- Paul Panzer as Peter (scenes deleted)
- George Tobias as Dock Worker (uncredited)
- Clem Bevans as Henry (baggage man) (uncredited)
- John Harron as Belga Line Steward (uncredited)
- Vera Lewis as Mrs. Dibble (uncredited)
- Jack Richardson as Husband Leaving Train (uncredited)
- Rosella Towne as Edith Colby (uncredited)
