= Martha Scott =

American actress (1912–2003)

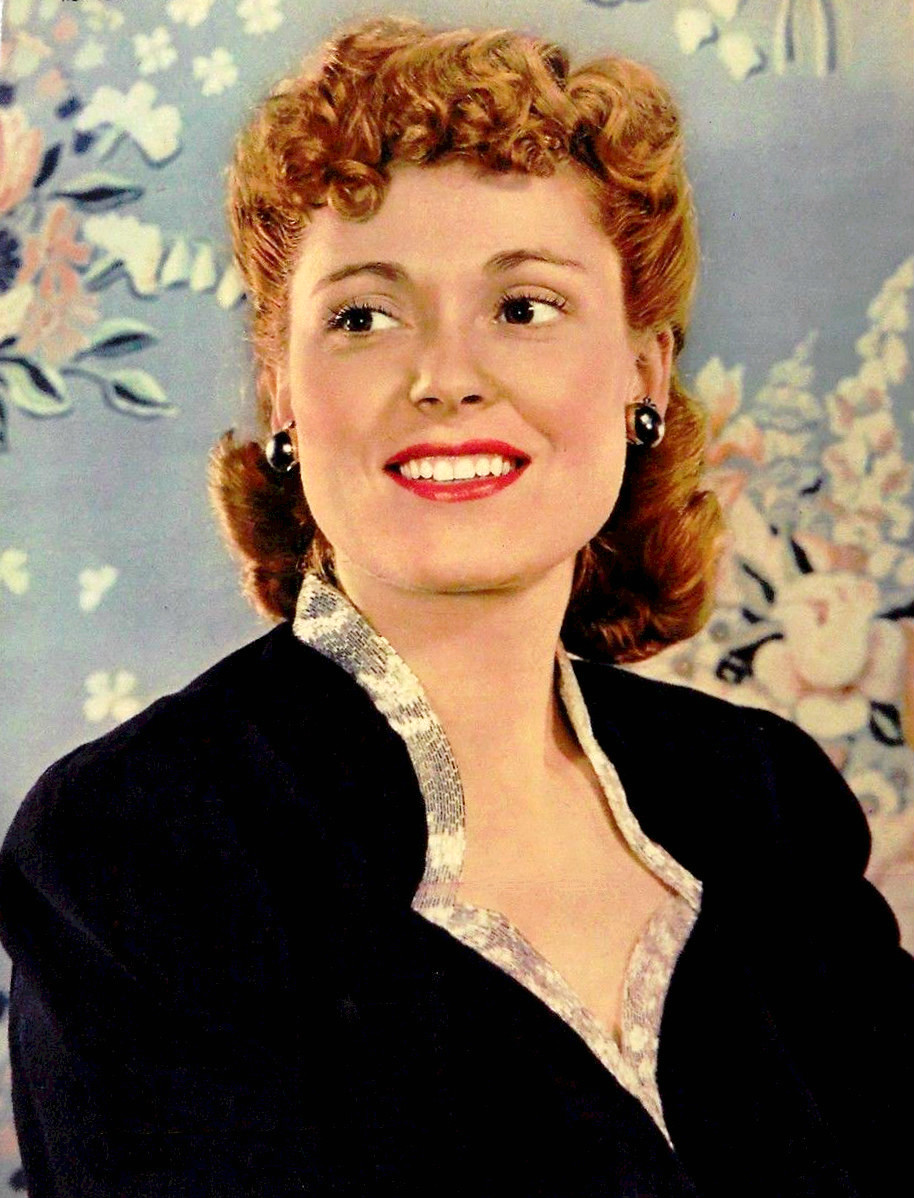
- Scott in 1942
- Born: Martha Ellen Scott; September 22, 1912; Jamesport, Missouri, U.S.
- Died: May 28, 2003 (aged 90); Los Angeles, California, U.S.
- Resting place: Masonic Cemetery
- Education: University of Michigan (BA)
- Occupation: Actress
- Years active: 1934–1990
- Spouses: Carlton Alsop (m. 1940; div. 1946); Mel Powell (m. 1946; died 1998)
- Children: 3

Martha Ellen Scott (September 22, 1912 – May 28, 2003) was an American actress. She was featured in major films such as Cecil B. DeMille’s The Ten Commandments (1956), and William Wyler's Ben-Hur (1959). Martha played the mother of Charlton Heston's character in both films. She originated the role of Emily Webb in Thornton Wilder's Our Town on Broadway in 1938, and later recreated the role in the 1940 film version, for which she was nominated for the Academy Award for Best Actress.

== Early life ==
Scott was born in Jamesport, Missouri. She was the daughter of Letha (née McKinley) and Walter Alva Scott. Walter was an engineer and garage owner. Her mother was a second cousin of U.S. President William McKinley. The Scott family remained in Jamesport until Martha was 13 years old. At that time, they moved to Kansas City, Missouri. Eventually, they relocated in Detroit, Michigan. Scott became interested in acting while in high school. She furthered this interest by attending the University of Michigan, where she earned a teaching certificate and a Bachelor of Arts degree in drama in 1934.

== Career ==
=== Stage ===
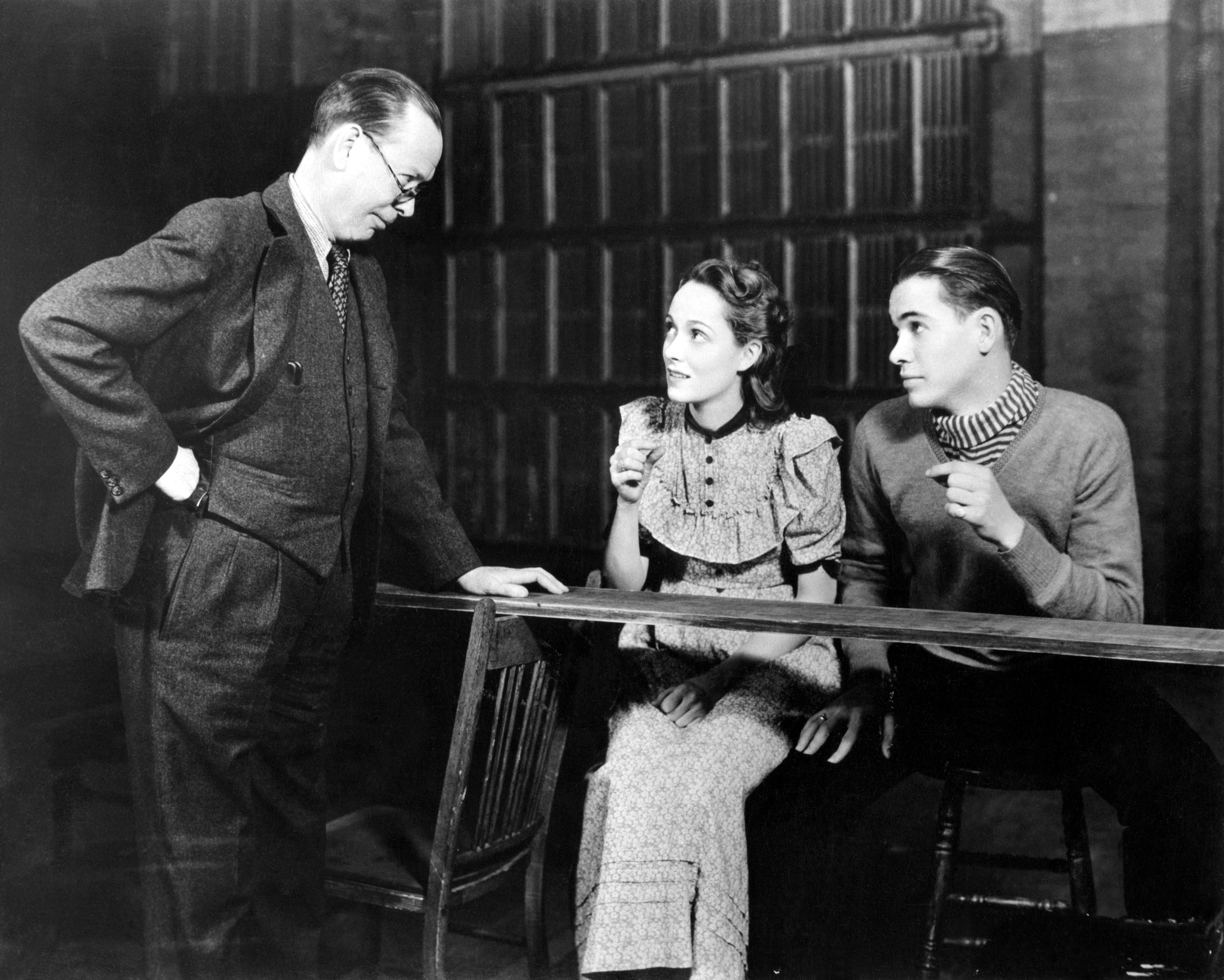
Frank Craven, Martha Scott and John Craven in the original Broadway production of Our Town (1938)

Scott appeared with the Globe Theatre Troupe in a series of Shakespeare productions at the Century of Progress world's fair in Chicago in 1934. Following that, she moved to New York City, where she found steady work both in stock stage productions and radio dramas. In 1938, she made her Broadway debut in the original staging of Thornton Wilder's play Our Town as Emily Webb, the tragic young woman who dies in childbirth.

=== Film ===
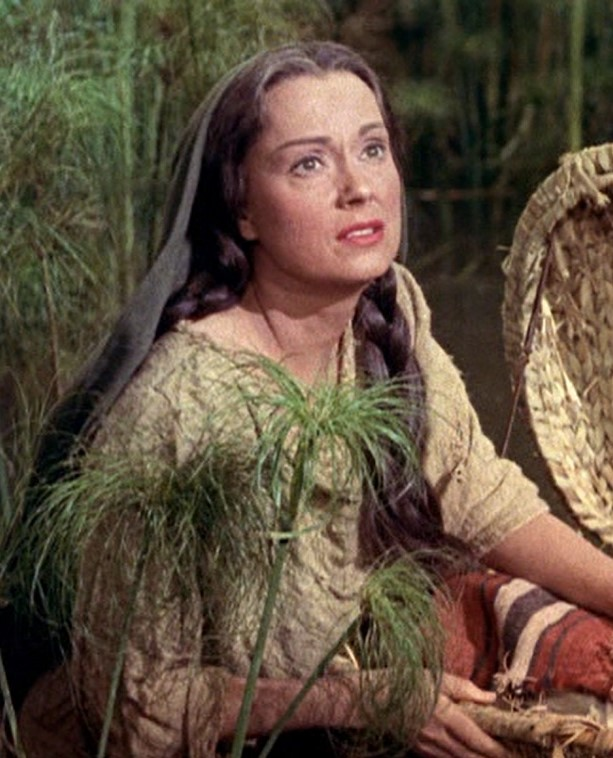
Scott as Moses' mother, Yochabel, in The Ten Commandments (1956)

Two years later, Scott reprised the role of Emily in her film debut when Our Town was made into a movie. Her critically acclaimed performance earned her an Academy Award nomination for Best Actress.

Scott found steady movie work for the next four decades, appearing in major epics such as The Ten Commandments, Ben-Hur, The Desperate Hours, and Airport 1975. Charlton Heston was a frequent co-star with Scott on both stage and screen. As she told an interviewer in 1988, "I played his mother twice and his wife twice. I was his mother in Ben Hur and The Ten Commandments. I was his wife on the stage in New York in Design for a Stained Glass Window and The Tumbler in London."

=== Producer ===
In 1968, Scott joined Henry Fonda and Robert Ryan in forming a theatrical production company called the Plumstead Playhouse. It later became the Plumstead Theatre Company and moved to Los Angeles. The company produced First Monday in October, both on stage and on film. Scott co-produced both versions. Her last production was Twelve Angry Men, which was performed at the Henry Fonda Theatre in Hollywood, California.

=== Television ===
Scott began appearing in TV roles in the medium's early days. On November 2, 1950, she starred in "The Cut Glass Bowl" on The Nash Airflyte Theater, followed by several guest appearances on Robert Montgomery Presents and other shows of television's "golden age", including two episodes of Alfred Hitchcock Presents. This pattern of guest roles continued through the 1960s with appearances on Route 66, Ironside, and The Courtship of Eddie's Father, among others. In the mid-1950s, Scott was the narrator for Modern Romances, an afternoon program on NBC-TV.

Scott was also a frequent TV guest star in the 1970s. She had recurring roles as Bob Newhart's mother on The Bob Newhart Show, the mother of Colonel Steve Austin (Lee Majors) on both The Six Million Dollar Man and The Bionic Woman, as well as Patricia Shepard, Sue Ellen and Kristin's mother on Dallas during its early years and later during the 1986 season. Scott was cast in single-episode guest appearances on several hit shows of the era, such as The Sandy Duncan Show, Columbo: Playback (1975), The Mod Squad, Marcus Welby, M.D., and The Love Boat. She played the role of Jennifer Talbot, Terri Brock's nasty grandmother, on General Hospital for six months (1986–1987), which ended when her character was murdered and stuffed in a drain pipe.

In the 1980s, she had a regular role on the short-lived series Secrets of Midland Heights and appeared in several television movies and in single episodes of shows such as Magnum, P.I., The Paper Chase, and Highway to Heaven. In 1987 she costarred with Jeffrey Lynn in an episode of Murder, She Wrote, which was a direct sequel to their 1949 feature film Strange Bargain. Scott's final acting role on television was in 1990 in the movie Daughter of the Streets.

== Personal life ==
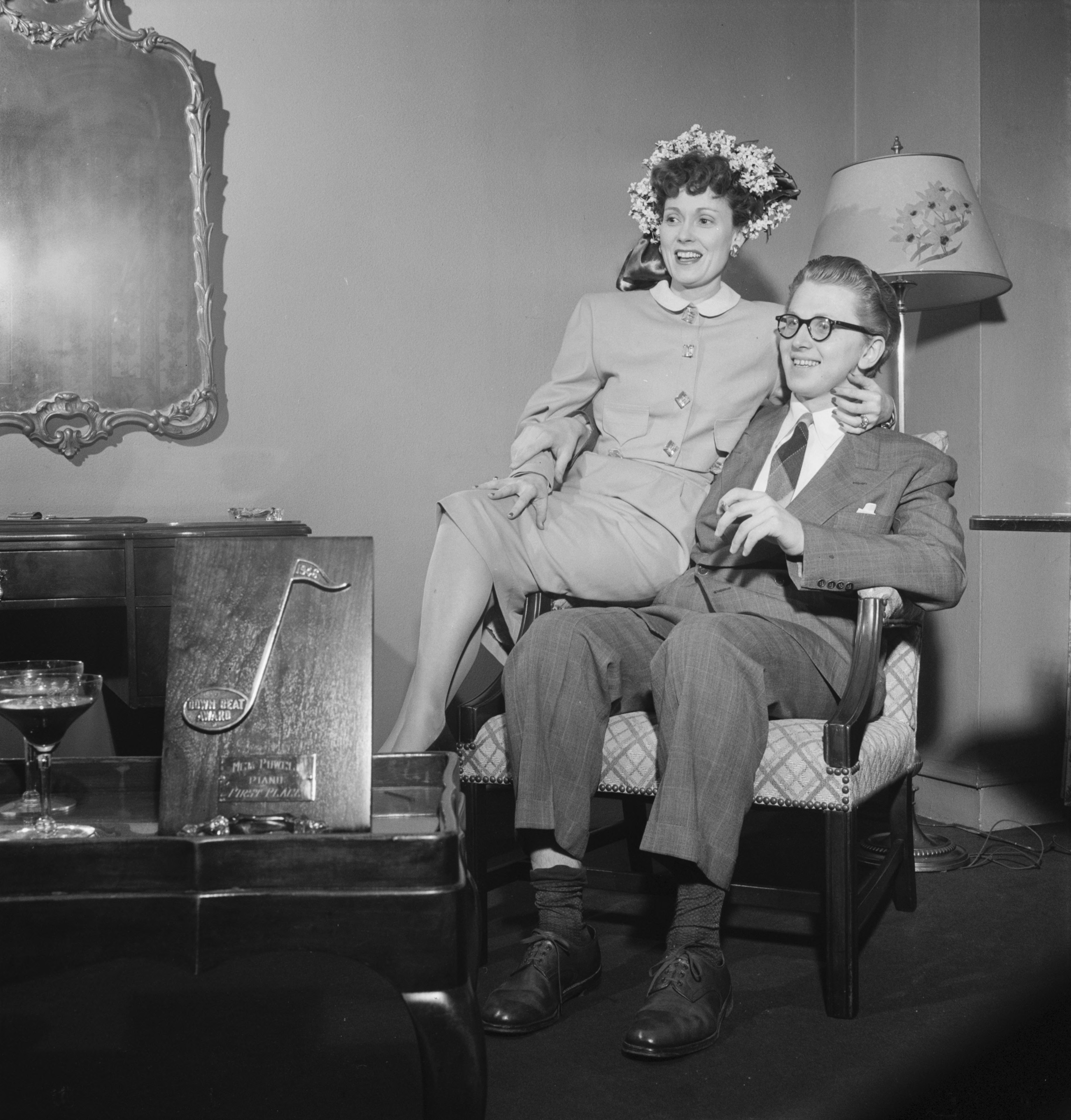
Scott with second husband Mel Powell in 1947

Gravesite of Martha Scott and husband Mel Powell in Jamesport, Missouri

Scott was married twice, first to radio producer and announcer Carleton William Alsop from 1940 to 1946, and then to jazz pianist and composer Mel Powell from 1946 until his death in 1998. She had one child with Alsop, son Carleton Scott Alsop, and two daughters—Mary Powell Harpel and Kathleen Powell—with her second husband.

According to her son, Scott never forgot about her childhood hometown, using the mental image of a Jamesport cemetery in preparation for her Oscar-nominated role in Our Town. Said Alsop, "She told me she used that place as her image because it's so serene and beautiful" and that her deceased McKinley and Scott relatives "became the Gibbs and the Webbs in the play".

== Death ==
Scott died on May 28, 2003, in Van Nuys, Los Angeles, aged 90, from natural causes. She was interred next to Powell in the Masonic Cemetery in her native Jamesport, Missouri.

== Honors ==
For her contribution in the theatre, Scott has a star on the Hollywood Walk of Fame at 6126 Hollywood Boulevard.

== Filmography ==
=== Film ===
Year	Title	Role	Notes
1936	Lloyds of London	Court room accuser	Uncredited
1940	Our Town	Emily Webb	
1940	The Howards of Virginia	Jane Peyton-Howard	
1941	Cheers for Miss Bishop	Ella Bishop	
1941	They Dare Not Love	Marta Keller	
1941	One Foot in Heaven	Hope Morris Spence	
1943	Stage Door Canteen	Martha Scott	
1943	Hi Diddle Diddle	Janie Prescott Phyffe	
1943	In Old Oklahoma	Catherine Elizabeth Allen	Alternate title: "War of the Wildcats"
1947	So Well Remembered	Olivia	
1949	Strange Bargain	Georgia Wilson	
1951	When I Grow Up	Mother Reed (1890's)	
1955	The Desperate Hours	Ellie Hilliard	
1956	The Ten Commandments	Yochabel	
1957	Eighteen and Anxious	Lottie Graham	
1957	Sayonara	Mrs. Webster	
1959	Ben-Hur	Miriam	
1973	Charlotte's Web	Jane Arable	Voice
1974	Airport 1975	Sister Beatrice	
1977	The Turning Point	Adelaide	
1981	First Monday in October		Cameo Appearance (uncredited)
1988	Doin' Time on Planet Earth	Virginia Camalier	

=== Television ===
Year	Title	Role	Notes
1950	The Nash Airflyte Theater		Season 1 Episode 7: "The Cut Glass Bowl"
1950–1957	Robert Montgomery Presents	Ellen Scott / Julia Brougham / Madeleine / Marietta Jackson	5 episodes
1951	Lux Video Theatre	Esmerelda	Season 1 Episode 19: "The Choir Rehearsal"
1951	Lights Out	Phyllis	Season 3 Episode 39: "The Cat's Cradle"
1951	The Clock		Season 3 Episode 1: "Journey Across the River"
1951	Somerset Maugham TV Theatre	Martha Jones	2 episodes
1952	Betty Crocker Star Matinee		Season 1 Episode 20: "Woman in His Life"
1952	Armstrong Circle Theatre		Season 2 Episode 29: "Way of Courage"
1953	The Web	Harriet	Season 3 Episode 37: "Dear Sister"
1953	The Revlon Mirror Theater		Season 1 Episode 2: "Salt of the Earth"
1953	Willys Theatre Presenting Ben Hecht's Tales of the City		Season 1 Episode 4: "Episode #1.4"
1953	Medallion Theatre		Season 1 Episode 9: "Scent of the Roses"
1953	Suspense		Season 6 Episode 1: "The Sister"
1954	Center Stage		Season 1 Episode 6: "The Desdemona Murder Case"
1955	TV Reader's Digest	Mrs. Robert Louis Stevenson	Season 1 Episode 3: "Mrs. Robert Louis Stevenson"
1956	Kraft Television Theatre	Joanna	Season 9 Episode 43: "Prairie Night"
1956–1957	Goodyear Television Playhouse	Kate Douglas	2 episodes
1957	Modern Romances	Narrator	Episode: "The Misguided Man: Part 5"
1958	Matinee Theater		Season 3 Episode 150: "The Gardenia Bush"
1959	Playhouse 90	Mrs. Austin	Season 3 Episode 25: "A Trip to Paradise"
1959	Markham	Marie Vaughn	Season 1 Episode 19: "Grave and Present Danger"
1959	The United States Steel Hour	Grace Sullivan	Season 7 Episode 3: "Rachel's Summer"
1960	New Comedy Showcase	Kit Tyler	Season 1 Episode 1: "You're Only Young Twice"
1961	The Play of the Week	Clara	Season 2 Episode 26: "The Wooden Dish"
1961–1962	Route 66	Helen Watson / Ruth O'Brien	2 episodes
1962	Follow the Sun	Betty Stover	Season 1 Episode 19: "Ghost Story"
1963	The DuPont Show of the Week	Helen Adams	Season 2 Episode 11: "Two Faces of Treason"
1963	The Nurses	Edith Arnold	Season 1 Episode 26: "A Dark World"
1963	The Greatest Show on Earth	Claire Kyle	Season 1 Episode 3: "No Middle Ground for Harry Kyle"
1965	Slattery's People	Fran Stevens	Season 2 Episode 10: "Color Him Red"
1967	Cimarron Strip	Mrs. Kihlgren	Season 1 Episode 9: "The Search"
1967	The F.B.I.	Katharine Lamberth	Season 3 Episode 8: "Overload"
1969	Ironside	Francine Miller	Season 2 Episode 18: "The Prophecy"
1970	The Courtship of Eddie's Father	Grandmother	Season 1 Episode 21: "Guardian for Eddie"
1970	Paris 7000	Amy Westerly	Season 1 Episode 9: "The Last Grand Tour"
1971	Longstreet	Louisa De Carie	Season 1 Episode 4: "So, Who's Fred Hornbeck?"
1971	Lemonade	Mabel	TV Movie
1972	Honeymoon Suite		Season 1 Episode 0: "First Pilot"
1972	The Sandy Duncan Show	Harriet	Season 1 Episode 1: "Hooray for Harriet"
1972	The Delphi Bureau	Martha	Season 1 Episode 1: "The Deadly Little Errand"
1972–1977	The Bob Newhart Show	Mrs. Martha Hartley	7 episodes
1973	The Devil's Daughter	Mrs. Stone	TV Movie
1973	The Mod Squad	Belle Fuller	Season 5 Episode 19: "Put Out the Welcome Mat for Death"
1973	Marcus Welby, M.D.	Mrs. Loring	Season 4 Episode 22: "The Other Martin Loring"
1973	Owen Marshall, Counselor at Law	Mildred	Season 3 Episode 8: "The Sin of Susan Gentry"
1974	Sorority Kill	House Mother	TV Movie
1974	The Man from Independence	Mamma Truman	TV Movie
1974	Police Story	Mary Ryan	Season 1 Episode 19: "Fingerprint"
1974	Thursday's Game	Mrs. Reynolds	TV Movie
1974	Murder in the First Person Singular	Mrs. Emerson	TV Movie
1974	The Wide World of Mystery	House Mother / Mrs. Emerson	2 episodes
1974	Police Woman	Mrs. Wadsworth	Season 1 Episode 3: "Warning: All Wives"
1974–1975	The Six Million Dollar Man	Helen Elgin	3 episodes
1975	The Abduction of Saint Anne	Mother Michael	TV Movie
1975	Columbo	Margaret Midas	Season 4 Episode 5: "Playback"
1975	The Legendary Curse of the Hope Diamond	Mumsie	TV Movie
1975	Medical Story	Miss McDonald	TV Movie
1976–1977	The Bionic Woman	Helen Elgin	6 episodes
1978	The Word	Sarah Randall	Miniseries
1979	Charleston	Mrs. Farrell-Aunt Louisa	TV Movie
1979	Married: The First Year	Elizabeth Gorey	2 episodes
1979	The Love Boat	Janet Latham	Season 3 Episode 6: "Gopher's Greatest Hits/The Vacation/One Rose a Day"
1979–1985	Dallas	Patricia Shepard	10 episodes (Recurring role)
1980	Beulah Land	Penelope Pennington	Miniseries
1980	Father Figure	Hilda Wollman	TV Movie
1980–1981	Secrets of Midland Heights	Margaret Millington	Series regular
1983	Summer Girl	Martina Shelburne	TV Movie
1983	Adam	Gram Walsh	TV Movie
1983	Magnum, P.I.	Jeanie LaSalle	Season 4 Episode 5: "Limited Engagement"
1984	The Paper Chase	Marion Grey	Season 2 Episode 13: "Limits"
1985–1986	General Hospital	Jennifer Talbot	10 episodes
1985–1987	Hotel	Estelle / Roz Campbell	2 episodes
1986	Adam: His Song Continues	Gram Walsh	TV Movie
1986	Highway to Heaven	Laura Swann	2 episodes
1987	Murder, She Wrote	Georgia Wilson	Season 3 Episode 21: "The Days Dwindle Down"
1989	Love and Betrayal	Ginger	TV Movie
1990	Daughter of the Streets	Sarah	TV Movie

== Radio appearances ==
Year	Program	Episode/source
1941	Philip Morris Playhouse	Made for Each Other
1941	Lux Radio Theatre	Cheers for Miss Bishop
1942	Lux Radio Theatre	One Foot in Heaven
1948	Suspense	"Crisis"
1949	The Great Gildersleeve	Birthday Party Conflicts
1953	Theatre Guild on the Air	Kate Fennigate
