= Strange Bargain =

1949 film by Will Price

- Theatrical release poster
- Directed by: Will Price
- Screenplay by: Lillie Hayward
- Story by: J.H. Wallis
- Produced by: Sid Rogell
- Starring: Martha Scott; Jeffrey Lynn; Harry Morgan
- Cinematography: Harry J. Wild
- Edited by: Frederic Knudtson
- Music by: Friedrich Hollaender
- Production company: RKO Pictures
- Release dates: September 29, 1949 (premiere-New York City); November 5, 1949 (US)
- Running time: 68 minutes
- Country: United States
- Language: English

Strange Bargain is a 1949 American crime mystery starring Martha Scott and Jeffrey Lynn. It is directed by Will Price. Harry Morgan appears in support.

It is the story of a bookkeeper in need of money who agrees against his own better judgment to help a wealthy man carry out a duplicitous suicide plan.

== Plot ==
Harried by his wife, deferential but financially stressed assistant bookkeeper Sam Wilson goes to his boss, Malcolm Jarvis, to ask for a raise. Instead, he learns he is about to lose his job because the firm is badly failing. Jarvis then offers a strange bargain, revealing he intends to commit suicide to provide for his cosseted wife Edna and son Sydney, but needs somebody to make it look like murder in order for his life insurance policies to pay off. He will give Sam $10,000 to help him.

Sam declines, but later tries to head Jarvis off after he receives a call indicating the suicide plan has been put in motion. When he arrives and finds Jarvis’ dead body, he reluctantly goes through with the scheme. He pockets an envelope Jarvis has left for him, fires two shots through the library windows as instructed, throws the revolver in the ocean, hides the $10,000 payoff money from his wife, then burns Jarvis’ instruction note.

Celebrated local detective Lt. Webb becomes suspicious of Jarvis's contentious business partner, Timothy Hearne, who is hiding that he had visited Jarvis at his home and argued with him earlier that night. Webb also uncovers Jarvis’ scheme to bolster his regular $50,000 life insurance policy with $200,000 in supplemental coverage, both of which become voided by a finding of suicide.

Sam's conscience gets the better of him. He decides to go see Edna and confess his role in her husband's scheme, which admission will leave her penniless. Offering her his $10,000 payoff as partial restitution for losing her husband, he is ridiculed for his kindness and shamed as a coward. Edna then reveals she killed her husband when he didn’t have the guts to go through with it, and is about to shoot Sam in the back when Webb shows up in the nick of time. Thanks to his cane Edna only wings Sam in the arm at point blank range.

== Cast ==
- Martha Scott as Georgia Wilson
- Jeffrey Lynn as Sam Wilson
- Harry Morgan (credited as Henry Morgan) as Lt. Richard Webb
- Katherine Emery as Edna Jarvis
- Richard Gaines as Malcolm Jarvis
- Henry O'Neill as Timothy Hearne
- Walter Sande as Sgt. Cord
- Michael Chapin as Roddy Wilson
- Arlene Gray as Hilda Wilson
- Raymond Roe as Sydney Jarvis
- Robert Bray as Det. McTay

== Reception ==
A. H. Weiler, the film critic for The New York Times penned a fairly positive review. He wrote, "As a modest entry from Hollywood, Strange Bargain, [...] is surprisingly diverting fare. [...] a melodrama that presents an extraordinary situation fairly suspensefully and, for the most part, through intelligent dialogue and direction. And, while it follows a familiar outline as a crime and punishment adventure, it does so neatly and with competent characterizations."

In 2019 online film critic Dennis Schwartz called the film "[a] well-conceived mystery B-film, but strictly second feature material."

The film has been broadcast on the Turner Classic Movies show 'Noir Alley', hosted by Eddie Muller.

== Murder, She Wrote ==
In 1987, the television series Murder, She Wrote broadcast an episode that served as a sequel of sorts to Strange Bargain, but discounted the original ending, instead seeing Jessica Fletcher being recruited to attempt to prove Sam Wilson's innocence following his 30-year prison sentence. The episode, “The Days Dwindle Down”, saw the stars of the film, Martha Scott, Jeffrey Lynn, and Harry Morgan reprising their original roles and included scenes from the film as flashbacks.
