= Katherine Emery =

American actress (1906–1980)

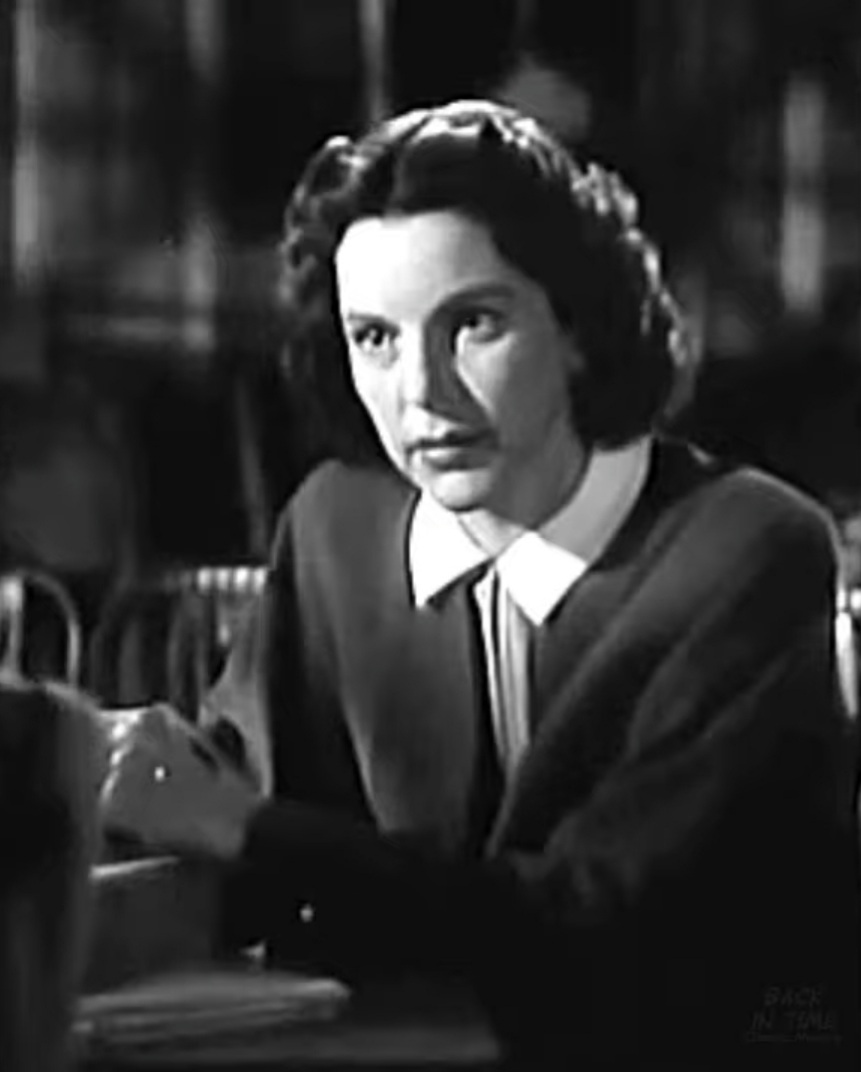
- Emery in Eyes in the Night (1942)
- Born: Katherine Drewry Emery; October 11, 1906; Birmingham, Alabama, U.S.
- Died: February 7, 1980 (aged 73); Portland, Maine, U.S.
- Education: Sweet Briar College
- Occupation: Actress
- Years active: 1923–1980
- Spouse: Paul Eaton (m. 1944; died 1975)
- Children: 2, including Rebecca Eaton

Katherine Drewry Emery (October 11, 1906 – February 7, 1980) was an American stage and film actress.

== Early life and education ==
Emery was born in Birmingham, Alabama. She graduated from Sweet Briar College in 1928 and then went home to Montclair, New Jersey, to act in semi-professional plays and direct plays for children.

== Career ==
Emery debuted professionally with the University Players in West Falmouth, Massachusetts, in 1932.

Her movie roles include Eyes in the Night (1942), Isle of the Dead (1945), The Locket (1946), The Walls Came Tumbling Down (1946), The Private Affairs of Bel Ami (1947), Arch of Triumph (1948), Chicken Every Sunday (1949), Strange Bargain (1949), Payment on Demand (1951), Hiawatha (1952), and Untamed Frontier (1952). Her final role was in The Maze (1953).

She is also known for her stage roles, including creating the role of Karen Wright in the original 1934 Broadway production of The Children's Hour. Other Broadway productions include The Cherry Orchard, Proof Thro' the Night, The Three Sisters, Everywhere I Roam, Roosty, As You Like It, Strangers at Home, and Carry Nation.

== Personal life ==
Emery was married to literature professor Paul Conant Eaton. She is the mother of television producer and film producer Rebecca Eaton and James E. C. Eaton.

== Death ==
She died on February 7, 1980, at a medical center in Portland, Maine from lung disease at aged 73.

== Filmography ==
Year	Title	Role	Notes
1942	Eyes in the Night	Cheli Scott	
1945	Isle of the Dead	Mrs. Mary St. Aubyn	
1946	The Walls Came Tumbling Down	Mrs. Stoker	
1946	The Locket	Mrs. John Ewart Willis Sr.	
1947	The Private Affairs of Bel Ami	Madame Walter	
1948	Arch of Triumph	Grim Nurse	Uncredited
1949	Chicken Every Sunday	Mrs. Mildred Lawson	
1949	Strange Bargain	Edna Jarvis	
1951	Payment on Demand	Mrs. Gates	
1952	Untamed Frontier	Camilla Denbow	
1952	Hiawatha	Nokomis	
1953	The Maze	Edith Murray	
