= Money and the Woman =

- Theatrical release poster
- Directed by: William K. Howard
- Screenplay by: Robert Presnell Sr.
- Story by: James M. Cain
- Produced by: Bryan Foy
- Starring: Jeffrey Lynn; Brenda Marshall; John Litel; Lee Patrick; Henry O'Neill; Roger Pryor
- Cinematography: L. William O'Connell
- Edited by: Frank Magee
- Music by: Bernhard Kaun
- Production company: Warner Bros. Pictures
- Distributed by: Warner Bros. Pictures
- Release date: August 17, 1940
- Running time: 67 minutes
- Country: United States
- Language: English

Money and the Woman is a 1940 American drama film directed by William K. Howard and written by Robert Presnell Sr.. The film stars Jeffrey Lynn, Brenda Marshall, John Litel, Lee Patrick, Henry O'Neill and Roger Pryor. The film was released by Warner Bros. Pictures on August 17, 1940.

== Cast ==
- Jeffrey Lynn as Dave Bennett
- Brenda Marshall as Barbara Patteson
- John Litel as Jeremy 'Jerry ' Helm
- Lee Patrick as Miss Martha Church
- Henry O'Neill as Mr. Mason
- Roger Pryor as Charles 'Charlie' Patteson
- Guinn 'Big Boy' Williams as Mr. Adler
- Henry Kolker as Mr. Rollins
- William Gould as Chief Detective Dyer
- Edward Keane as Mr. Kaiser
- William Marshall as Bank Clerk
- Peter Ashley as Bank Teller
- Mildred Coles as Secretary at Bank
- Sandra Stephenson as Jeannie Patteson
- Willie Best as George Washington Jones
