= Lost Lagoon (film) =

1958 American film by John Rawlins

- Theatrical release poster
- Directed by: John Rawlins
- Screenplay by: Milton Subotsky; John Rawlins; Jeffrey Lynn
- Produced by: John Rawlins
- Starring: Jeffrey Lynn; Lelia Barry; Peter Donat; Don Gibson; Roger Clark; Jane Hartley
- Cinematography: Harry W. Smith
- Edited by: David Rawlins
- Music by: Terry Brannon; Hubert Smith
- Production company: Bermuda Studio Productions
- Distributed by: United Artists
- Release date: February 1958
- Running time: 79 minutes
- Country: United States
- Language: English

Lost Lagoon is a 1958 American drama film directed by John Rawlins and written by Milton Subotsky, John Rawlins and Jeffrey Lynn. The film stars Jeffrey Lynn, Lelia Barry, Peter Donat, Don Gibson, Roger Clark and Jane Hartley. It was released in February 1958 by United Artists.

== Plot ==
Presumed lost at sea in a storm, a man washes up in the Bahamas where he finds a new life and love. But guilt and an insurance agent may cut his dream short.

== Cast ==
- Jeffrey Lynn as Charlie Walker
- Lelia Barry as Elizabeth Moore
- Peter Donat as David Burnham
- Don Gibson as Mr. Beakins
- Roger Clark as Millard Cauley
- Jane Hartley as Bernadine Walker
- Celeste Robinson as Colima
- Stanley Seymour as native
- Isabelle Jones as native
- Hubert Smith as himself

== Critical reception ==
The Monthly Film Bulletin wrote: "In the context of the cinema of crime and horror and cynicism and galloping horses, it is refreshing to find an old-fashioned piece of sentimental novelette as frank as this. It is a pity there is not more to praise though than its intentions. The direction is mechanical, the romance desultory, and the players (apart from the coloured ones, who steal the show) just not good enough."
