= The Fighting 69th =

1940 film by William Keighley

- VHS cover
- Directed by: William Keighley
- Written by: Norman Reilly Raine; Fred Niblo, Jr. Dean Riesner
- Produced by: Louis F. Edelman; Hal B. Wallis
- Starring: James Cagney; Pat O'Brien; George Brent; Dennis Morgan; Alan Hale, Sr.
- Cinematography: Tony Gaudio
- Edited by: Owen Marks
- Music by: Adolph Deutsch
- Color process: Black and white
- Production company: Warner Bros. Pictures
- Distributed by: Warner Bros. Pictures
- Release dates: January 26, 1940 (New York City); January 27, 1940 (US)
- Running time: 90 minutes
- Country: United States
- Language: English
- Box office: $2,313,000

The Fighting 69th is a 1940 American war film starring James Cagney, Pat O'Brien, and George Brent. The plot is based upon the actual exploits of New York City's 69th Infantry Regiment during World War I. The regiment was given that nickname when opposing General Robert E. Lee during the American Civil War.

Real people portrayed in The Fighting 69th include Father Francis P. Duffy, the chaplain; battalion commander and future OSS leader "Wild Bill" Donovan; Lt. Oliver Ames, a platoon commander; and then-Sgt. Joyce Kilmer (Jeffrey Lynn), a famous poet, who was killed in battle on July 30, 1918.

Most of The Fighting 69th was filmed at Warner Bros.' Calabasas Ranch location, which served as Camp Mills, the regiment's training base, various French villages, and numerous battlefields.

== Plot ==
The plot centers on misfit Jerry Plunkett (James Cagney), a tough-talking New Yorker who displays a mixture of bravado and disrespect for officers. Caught up in patriotic fervor when the United States enters WWI, he joins the 69th with aim of winning medals by singlehandedly defeating the Germans.

However, Plunkett's inexperience and disrespect for command lead to him making errors in battle and eventually show him to be a coward. The chaplain, Father Francis P. Duffy (Pat O'Brien) believes there to be something more in the young man and begs the 69th's commanding officer Major "Wild Bill" Donovan (George Brent) to give Plunkett one more chance. Donovan reluctantly agrees and when the 69th is ordered to send a squad into no man's land to capture German soldiers for intel, Donovan orders Plunkett to join them.

Plunkett's inexperience and nervousness lead to him accidentally disclosing the squad's position and leads to the deaths of many of his fellow men, including two well respected soldiers Lieutenant "Long John" Wynn (Dick Foran) and Private Timothy "Timmy" Wynn (William Lundigan). Donovan is outraged and ultimately orders Plunkett to be court-martialed. However, while he is awaiting execution, Father Duffy approaches Plunkett in one last attempt to save him spiritually. Plunkett begs the priest to release him so he can desert the army and escape the war. As Father Duffy declines his request, the jail cell is destroyed by a German shell and Plunkett is freed, saving Father Duffy from the rubble. He then witnesses Father Duffy ministering to several wounded troops immediately afterwards, urging them to keep their faith and have courage.

Shamed and inspired by Duffy's actions, Plunkett decides to rejoin his unit at the front and support their advance. However, when he catches up with the 69th he spots that the battalion has been stopped by a fierce German bombardment. Coming across a mortar whose crew have almost all been killed, he finds Sgt. "Big Mike" Wynn and implores the older man to tell him how to operate the mortar. Sgt. Wynn initially refuses as he recalls how Plunkett had caused the death of his two brothers.

Plunkett though perseveres and starts to use the mortar to counter the German bombardment and allow the 69th to push ahead with the advance. The Germans though counter and throw a grenade into the trench where Plunkett and Sgt. Wynn are. Without pause, Plunkett sacrifices himself by diving on the grenade in a bid to protect "Big Mike". Plunkett is mortally wounded and succumbs to his wounds leaving Major Donovan and Sgt Wynn in shock at the young man's true bravery.

While Jerry Plunkett was a fictional character, Father Duffy, Major Donovan, Lt. Ames, and poet Joyce Kilmer were all real members of the 69th. Many of the events depicted (training at Camp Mills, the Mud March, dugout collapse at Rouge Bouquet, crossing the Ourcq River, Victory Parade, etc.) actually happened.

== Cast ==
- James Cagney as Private Jerry Plunkett
- Pat O'Brien as Father Francis P. Duffy
- George Brent as Major "Wild Bill" Donovan
- Jeffrey Lynn as Sergeant Joyce Kilmer
- Alan Hale, Sr. as Sergeant "Big Mike" Wynn
- Frank McHugh as Terence "Crepe-Hanger" Burke
- Dennis Morgan as Lieutenant Oliver Ames
- Dick Foran as Lieutenant "Long John" Wynn
- William Lundigan as Private Timothy "Timmy" Wynn
- Guinn Williams as Paddy Dolan
- Henry O'Neill as The Colonel
- John Litel as Captain Mangan

- Sammy Cohen as "Mike Murphy"
- Harvey Stephens as Major Alex Anderson
- William Hopper as Private Turner
- Tom Dugan as Private McManus
- Frank Wilcox as Lieutenant John Norman
- George Reeves as Jack O'Keefe
- Frank Coghlan, Jr. as Jimmy
- Herbert Anderson as Casey
- Richard Clayton as Tierney
- Eddie Dew as Regan
- Frank Mayo as Capt. Bootz (uncredited)
- Roland Varno as German Officer (uncredited)

== Production ==
John T. Prout, an Irish American who was a former Captain in the regiment and a general in the Irish Army, served as the film's technical advisor.

Priscilla Lane was initially cast as one of the soldiers' girls back home, but the part was cut prior to production. No female characters are seen in the film.

== Reception ==
According to Warner Bros. records, the film made $1,822,000 domestically and $491,000 foreign, for a worldwide total of $2,313,000.
