= Bakersfield Community Theatre =

Coordinates: 35.33312°N 119.01416°W

Bakersfield Community Theatre (BCT) in Bakersfield, California is the oldest continuing community theatre in California; and the second oldest amateur community theatre in the Western United States: the Tacoma Little Theatre, est. 1918 in Tacoma, Washington, is the oldest.

Officially established in 1927, BCT has been putting on a full season of plays and musicals starting when Albert Johnson directed the beginning of a continuous string of productions.

The theatre has been remodeled a few times, and is currently capable of holding an audience of 181.

== History ==
Bakersfield Community Theatre was founded in May 1927. Prior to this date, community theatre productions were frequently produced in Bakersfield by various clubs. The Bakersfield Woman's Club presented theatre productions, as well as the Elks, DeMolay, and the Plymouth Guild. Albert Johnson worked to make community theatre part of Bakersfield culture.

In November 1926, Gilmor Brown of the Pasadena Playhouse gave a speech before the Bakersfield Woman's Club outlining possible procedures for organizing a local community theatre. "Call a mass meeting," he advised. "Do not depend too much on the names always associated with important community activities. Sincere workers and promising talent will be found in unexpected places if the proposition is presented as a real community project."

In early May 1927, a group of women met one night at the Woman's Club building to found a community theatre. They included Alma Campbell, Ethel Robinson, Mrs. George Shearer, and Helen T. Peairs. Using telephones and the newspaper, they announced a public meeting to be held a few days later on May 16, 1927 at the clubhouse. More than fifty people attended and the founding group expanded to include Mrs. Ross C. Miller, Evelyn Derby, Dwight Clark, Thomas McManus and Laurence Taylor. Ten days later the founders had finished writing the constitution and bylaws and had taken on 98 paid season members. The name Bakersfield Community Theatre (BCT) was adopted.

Another public meeting was called on May 31, 1927 at the courthouse for election of board members and officers. Paid membership had grown to 125 members. By the end of the evening the new community theatre was underway and committee chairmen had received their assignments. The total time to found the theatre was a little over two weeks. On October 31, 1927 the first BCT production was presented: The First Year by Frank Craven, performed at Bakersfield High School's auditorium before an audience of more than 400 people. Alma Campbell directed the production. Four productions were presented each season for the first nine years. For many years there was only one performance given for each production. The number of performances for each production has gradually increased, going from one a year to four by the mid-1950s. Currently, the typical adult production at BCT, whether musical or not, has six full=length productions, plus their Annual One-Act Festival every August.

=== Mid-20th century ===
Commencing with the 1936-1937 season, five productions were presented. With few exceptions, each season since has been made up of, at least, five shows. Since the theatre did not have a playhouse to call home, between 1927 and 1961 the productions were presented in the auditoriums at Washington Junior High School (which is now the administration building for Bakersfield City School District), Standard Junior High School, Golden State Junior High School (now the Blair Learning Center), and the old auditorium at Bakersfield High School.

In April 1961, BCT opened the new playhouse with a production of For The Love Of Maggie, written by Barbara Gardener and Ann Agabashian (both of Bakersfield) and directed by Howard Miller. This production was presented between the 4th and 5th productions of the 1960-1961 season. The playhouse (located at 2400 South Chester Avenue) has been the location for all productions presented since April 1961 with the exception of two presented at the Bakersfield College Indoor Theatre in 1968 and 1983.

In the summer of 1976, remodeling of the playhouse began under the supervision of Roger Benischek, and the approval of the Board of Directors of BCT, with Richard ‘Stubby” Newman, the President at that time. The design to give the theatre a new look was drafted by Joseph Licastro. The first remodeling was of the auditorium interior, completed just prior to the opening night of “Play It Again, Sam” The ticket office was revamped to include an office, ticket counter, and a lounge with posters on the walls of past productions. The front of the theatre was refurbished in the summer of 1980. New features included a brick patio with plants and a metal sculpture (created by Frank Wattron), a lawn with a high white stucco wall, a ramp and deck overlooking the patio, a new light booth, two small lobbies and a white electric sign with "Bakersfield Community Theatre" in blue lettering on it. All of these features were completed a few hours prior to the opening of Side by Side by Sondheim in September 1980. Since then a rehearsal hall and workshop has been added to the back of the theatre. The most recent remodeling was done in the summer of 1983 when the auditorium seats were replaced with 181 new ones. The interior was again remodeled to match the decor of the seats.

=== Present day ===
Bakersfield Community Theatre continues to present five main productions (as well as an annual one act festival and numerous youth theatre shows) each theatre season. The theatre has staged seasons uninterrupted since 1927.

== Shows ==
Following is a partial list of the many productions put on over the years at BCT:

=== Musicals ===
Kiss Me Kate °° The Music Man °° Babes In Arms °° South Pacific °° Sound Of Music °° Guys And Dolls °° West Side Story °° The King And I °° Oklahoma °° Wonderful Towns °° Damn Yankees °° George M °° My Fair Lady °° Annie Get Your Gun °° Gypsy °° Bye Bye Birdie °° How To Succeed In Business Without Really Trying °° Carnival °° Camelot °° A Funny Thing Happened On The Way To The Forum °° Oliver! °° Hello Dolly! °° Fiddler On The Roof °° Man Of La Mancha °° Peter Pan °° Sweet Charity °° Cabaret °° I Do! I Do! °° Mame °° Promises, Promises °° Two Gentlemen Of Verona °° A Little Night Music °° A Chorus Line °° Annie

=== Non-musical ===
==== Drama ====
The Miracle °° Deathtrap °° The Gin Game °° In The Boom Boom Room °° Glengarry Glen Ross °° The Grapes Of Wrath °° The Diary Of Anne Frank °° Death Of A Salesman °° Private Lives °° The Mousetrap

==== Comedy ====
Plaza Suite °° Barefoot In The Park °° Noises Off °° Cactus Flower °° You Can't Take It With You °° No Sex Please, We’re British °° Play It Again, Sam °° Life With Father °° I Remember Mama °° Harvey °° Arsenic And Old Lace °° Butterflies Are Free
