= Boulder Dam (film) =

1936 film by Frank McDonald

- Directed by: Frank McDonald
- Screenplay by: Sy Bartlett; Ralph Block
- Produced by: Samuel Bischoff
- Starring: Ross Alexander; Patricia Ellis; Lyle Talbot; Eddie Acuff; Henry O'Neill; Egon Brecher
- Cinematography: Arthur L. Todd
- Edited by: Jack Saper
- Music by: Heinz Roemheld
- Production company: Warner Bros. Pictures
- Distributed by: Warner Bros. Pictures
- Release date: March 7, 1936
- Running time: 70 minutes
- Country: United States
- Language: English

Boulder Dam is a 1936 American drama film directed by Frank McDonald and written by Sy Bartlett and Ralph Block. The film stars Ross Alexander, Patricia Ellis, Lyle Talbot, Eddie Acuff, Henry O'Neill and Egon Brecher. The film was released by Warner Bros. Pictures on March 7, 1936.

== Plot ==
Rusty Noonan is a mechanic in Detroit, Michigan. During an altercation with his boss he kills the man in self-defense. After fleeing Detroit he finds himself in Las Vegas, Nevada. He befriends a woman named Ann and finds work helping construct the Boulder Dam. Eventually Rusty sees the error in his past behavior and sets out to change himself.

== Cast ==
- Ross Alexander as Rusty Noonan
- Patricia Ellis as Ann Vangarick
- Lyle Talbot as Lacy
- Eddie Acuff as Ed Harper
- Henry O'Neill as Mr. Agnew
- Egon Brecher as Pa Vangarick
- Eleanor Wesselhoeft as Ma Vangarick
- Joseph Crehan as Ross
- George Breakston as Stan Vangarick
- William Pawley as Wilson
- Ronnie Cosby as Peter Vangarick

== See also ==
- List of films set in Las Vegas
