= Flight from Destiny =

1941 film by Vincent Sherman

- Theatrical release poster
- Directed by: Vincent Sherman
- Screenplay by: Barry Trivers
- Based on: Trial and Error; 1937 novel by Anthony Berkeley Cox
- Produced by: Bryan Foy
- Starring: Geraldine Fitzgerald; Thomas Mitchell; Jeffrey Lynn; James Stephenson; Mona Maris; Jonathan Hale
- Cinematography: James Van Trees
- Edited by: Thomas Richards
- Music by: Heinz Roemheld
- Production company: Warner Bros. Pictures
- Distributed by: Warner Bros. Pictures
- Release date: February 8, 1941
- Running time: 75 minutes
- Country: United States
- Language: English

Flight from Destiny is a 1941 American drama film noir directed by Vincent Sherman and written by Barry Trivers. The film stars Geraldine Fitzgerald, Thomas Mitchell, Jeffrey Lynn, James Stephenson, Mona Maris and Jonathan Hale. The film was released by Warner Bros. Pictures on February 8, 1941.

== Synopsis ==
After his doctor informs him he will die in six months, Professor Henry Todhunter (Thomas Mitchell) decides to spend his last days killing someone who contributes nothing but harm to society. When Henry learns that his friend Betty's (Geraldine Fitzgerald) husband, Michael (Jeffrey Lynn), has been painting forgeries of ancient paintings for gallery owner Ketti Moret (Mona Maris), he investigates the fraudulent dealer's life. Judging that Ketti is truly evil, Henry prepares to murder her.

== Cast ==
- Geraldine Fitzgerald as Betty Farroway
- Thomas Mitchell as Professor Henry Todhunter
- Jeffrey Lynn as Michael Farroway
- James Stephenson as Dr. Lawrence Stevens
- Mona Maris as Ketti Moret
- Jonathan Hale as District Attorney
- David Bruce as Saunders
- Thurston Hall as Dean Somers
- Mary Gordon as Martha
- John Eldredge as Peterson
- Hardie Albright as Ferrers
- William Forrest as Prentiss
- Weldon Heyburn as Brooks
- William Hopper as Travin
- Alexander Lockwood as Conway
- Frank Reicher as Edward Kreindling
- Willie Best as George
- Libby Taylor as Maid

== Reception ==
T.M.P. of The New York Times said, "What would you do if you only had six months to live? That is the problem which confronts Thomas Mitchell as an elderly professor suffering from an aortic aneurysm in Flight From Destiny. The same question has been pondered before on the screen, but seldom has it been dealt with so intelligently and entertainingly as in the new Warner drama at the Palace. Scenarist Barry Trivers has avoided artfully the pitfalls of a morbid theme by having Professor Todhunter regard his plight philosophically. And it was most fortunate that an actor of Mr. Mitchell's ability was selected to interpret the role, for he is a tower of strength."
