= A Girl with Ideas =

1937 film by S. Sylvan Simon

A Girl With Ideas
- Directed by: S. Sylvan Simon
- Written by: Bruce Manning; Robert T. Shannon; William Rankin
- Produced by: Edmund Grainger
- Starring: Wendy Barrie; Walter Pidgeon; Kent Taylor
- Cinematography: Milton R. Krasner
- Edited by: Philip Cahn
- Music by: Charles Previn
- Production company: Universal Pictures
- Distributed by: Universal Pictures
- Release date: November 1, 1937
- Running time: 70 minutes
- Country: United States
- Language: English

A Girl With Ideas is a 1937 American comedy drama film directed by S. Sylvan Simon and starring Wendy Barrie, Walter Pidgeon, and Kent Taylor. It was produced and distributed by Universal Pictures.

== Plot ==
After his newspaper libels heiress Mary Morton, Mickey McGuire is ordered to pay her a large sum of money. The only way he can do this is to hand her ownership of the newspaper. However he encourages the editor to undermine the title through sabotage, hoping that he will then be able to regain control.

== Cast ==
- Wendy Barrie as Mary Morton
- Walter Pidgeon as Mickey McGuire
- Kent Taylor as Frank Barner
- Dorothea Kent as Isabelle Foster
- George Barbier as John Morton
- Henry Hunter as William Duncan
- Samuel S. Hinds as Rodding Carter
- Edward Gargan as Eddie
- Ted Osborne as Bailey
- Horace McMahon as Al
- George Humbert as Toni
- Norman Willis as Hanson

== Bibliography ==
- Tucker, David C. S. Sylvan Simon, Moviemaker: Adventures with Lucy, Red Skelton and Harry Cohn in the Golden Age of Hollywood. McFarland, 2021.
