= It All Came True =

1940 film by Lewis Seiler

- Film poster
- Directed by: Lewis Seiler
- Screenplay by: Michael Fessier; Lawrence Kimble; Delmer Daves (uncredited)
- Based on: Better Than Life; 1936 short story Hearst's International Cosmopolitan by Louis Bromfield
- Produced by: Mark Hellinger
- Starring: Ann Sheridan; Jeffrey Lynn; Humphrey Bogart
- Cinematography: Ernest Haller
- Edited by: Thomas Richards
- Music by: Heinz Roemheld (uncredited)
- Production company: Warner Bros. Pictures
- Distributed by: Warner Bros. Pictures
- Release dates: April 5, 1940 (New York City); April 6, 1940 (United States)
- Running time: 97 minutes
- Country: United States
- Language: English

It All Came True is a 1940 American musical comedy crime film starring Ann Sheridan as a fledgling singer and Humphrey Bogart, who was third-billed on movie posters, as a gangster who hides from the police in a boarding house. It is based on the Louis Bromfield novel Better Than Life. Sheridan introduced the hit song "Angel in Disguise". The picture was produced by Mark Hellinger and directed by Lewis Seiler. The cast also featured Jeffrey Lynn as the leading man, Zasu Pitts, and Una O'Connor.

== Plot ==
Aspiring songwriter Tommy Taylor pins his hopes on the promises of his employer, gambler and gangster "Chips" Maguire. However, Chips uses the gun he had registered under Tommy's name to kill Monks when he betrays Chips to the police. It turns out Chips had Tommy carry the gun for just such a situation, to provide him with a fall guy. Needing a place to hide out, Chips blackmails Tommy into taking him to the boarding house owned by his mother, Nora Taylor, and her longtime friend, Maggie Ryan, by threatening to turn the gun over to the police.

Nora is overjoyed to see her son after an absence of five years. Tommy introduces them to Chips, who pretends to be a man named Grasselli recovering from a nervous condition. By chance, Maggie's showgirl daughter, Sarah Jane, returns the same day. The two mothers dream of their children getting married, but Tommy seems indifferent to Sarah Jane.

Sarah Jane becomes suspicious of Grasselli, who does his best to avoid being seen. She eventually hides in the hall bathroom and recognizes him, having worked for him once. Unwilling to get Nora and Maggie in trouble, she agrees to keep Chips's secret. Nora starts mothering Chips, as does Maggie after a while. Tired of hiding in his room all the time, Chips emerges and becomes acquainted with the other boarders: Miss Flint, Mr. Salmon, washed-up magician The Great Boldini, and Mr. Van Diver. In the parlor, Chips enjoys an amateur show put on by Tommy, Sarah Jane, and the boarders.

When Sarah Jane learns that Nora and Maggie are about to lose their house due to unpaid taxes, she turns to Chips for help, encouraging his attentions, even though she is in love with Tommy. He provides the money, but as that will only postpone their financial problem, he suggests (out of sheer boredom) that they set up the boarding house to bring in money by turning it into an exclusive nightclub, with the added advantage that Tommy and Sarah Jane can showcase their talents. Nora is enthusiastic, but it takes some persuasion to get Maggie to go along.

In the meantime, Miss Flint sees Chips's picture in a crime magazine. Sarah Jane intimates that Chips will have her killed in a gruesome manner if she tells anyone what she knows. But on opening night, after drinking too much champagne, she becomes frightened by Chips's taunts and goes to the police station. Two detectives spot Chips in the nightclub, but agree to let him watch the rest of the show. Tommy sees the cops and assumes the worst. He goes to the roof to be alone. When Sarah Jane joins him there, he finally admits he loves her. She urges him to flee, but he refuses to run away. Though he can easily incriminate Tommy, Chips decides to confess to the murder, allowing the young lovers to make a clean beginning.

== Cast ==
- Ann Sheridan as Sarah Jane Ryan
- Jeffrey Lynn as Tommy Taylor
- Humphrey Bogart as Grasselli/Chips Maguire
- ZaSu Pitts as Miss Flint
- Una O'Connor as Maggie Ryan
- Jessie Busley as Mrs. Nora Taylor
- John Litel as "Doc" Roberts
- Grant Mitchell as Mr. Rene Salmon
- Felix Bressart as The Great Boldini
- Charles Judels as Henri Pepi de Bordeaux, the head waiter Chips hires for the nightclub
- Brandon Tynan as Mr. Van Diver
- Howard Hickman as Mr. Prendergast
- Herb Vigran as Monks (credited as Herbert Vigran)
- Tommy Reilly
- The Elderbloom Chorus as Group Performers
- Bender and Daum as Performing Duo
- White and Stanley as Performing Duo
- The Lady Killers' Quartet as Singing Quartet

== Production ==
The film was based on a novella by Louis Bromfield. According to producer David Lewis, "It was written by a fine author well enough to rise above its banalities. Casey Robinson had long wanted to do it, and I thought it way above most of the material on tap, and so we were given a green light to proceed. We did the script with a very light touch in keeping with Bromfield’s story. It emerged a charming little piece."

Lewis always considered Anne Sheridan for the lead. George Raft and John Garfield were offered the male lead prior to Bogart taking the part. According to Lewis, Bogart wanted to play the role as he was friends with Bromfield; the actor persuaded Raft to drop out by saying the part was beneath him.

Lewis wrote "Unfortunately, the film was assigned to director Lewis Seiler, who had done many Warner pictures. He was a heavy-handed director, somewhat dense though amiable. I hated every foot he shot. Without knowing better, he was vulgarizing the whole thing, but he was a good Warner boy and I couldn’t budge the front office. " During filming Lewis was assigned to a remake of One Way Passage.

Years later, Warners re-issued the movie with refilmed opening credits giving Bogart top billing above Sheridan. As this is the version currently airing on Turner Classic Movies, it can be presumed that the original titles have not survived.

During filming Lewis was assigned off the film to Til We Meet Again and that film's producer Mark Hellinger was put on It All Came True.

== Home media ==
A DVD of the film was released by the Warner Archive Collection in February 2012.

The film was released on Blu-ray by the Warner Archive Collection on March 31, 2026. The release comes with the original theatrical trailer, as well as the classic Warner Bros. Cartoons shorts The Sour Puss and Circus Today.

== Notes ==
- Lewis, David (1993). Curtis, James (ed.). The Creative Producer. Metuchen: Scarecrow Press. ISBN 0-8108-2720-4.
