= Million Dollar Baby (1941 film) =

1941 film by Curtis Bernhardt

- Directed by: Curtis Bernhardt
- Written by: Casey Robinson; Richard Macaulay; Jerry Wald
- Based on: Miss Wheelwright Discovers America by Leonard Spigelgass
- Produced by: Hal B. Wallis
- Starring: Priscilla Lane; Jeffrey Lynn; Ronald Reagan
- Cinematography: Charles Rosher
- Edited by: Rudi Fehr
- Music by: Frederick Hollander
- Production company: Warner Bros. Pictures
- Distributed by: Warner Bros. Pictures
- Release date: May 31, 1941
- Running time: 100 minutes
- Country: United States
- Language: English

Million Dollar Baby is a 1941 American romantic comedy film directed by Curtis Bernhardt and starring Priscilla Lane, Jeffrey Lynn, Ronald Reagan, May Robson and Lee Patrick. The film was based on a short story by Leonard Spigelgass. It was produced and distributed by Warner Bros. Pictures.

== Plot ==
When wealthy American expatriate Cornelia Wheelwright is informed by her longtime lawyers that her late father swindled his partner, Fortune McCallister, out of $700,000, she acts decisively. First, because James Amory is the only lawyer in the firm to be outraged by the injustice, she hires him and fires the rest of the firm. His first task is to locate all of McCallister's heirs. It turns out there is only one: granddaughter Pam McCallister.

Pam works in Lacey's Department Store and lives in a boardinghouse in New York City. To find out what kind of person she is, Cornelia becomes a fellow tenant. Cornelia also meets Pam's boyfriend, composer and piano player Pete Rowan (Reagan).

Cornelia then has Jim give Pam a million dollars. Pam is excited at first, buying gifts for her boardinghouse friends, and her boyfriend, who lives across the hall from her. Much to her surprise, her friends and boyfriend seem to change overnight. They are not as overjoyed at her good fortune as she imagines they would be, and rather resent her. As the last straw, her boyfriend tells her she's an Elsie Dinsmore and breaks it off with her. Pam finally decides on a course of action that makes her happy, as well as those around her.

== Cast ==
- Priscilla Lane as Pamela "Pam" McAllister
- Jeffrey Lynn as James "Jimmy" Amory
- Ronald Reagan as Peter "Pete" Rowan
- May Robson as Cornelia Wheelwright / Miss White
- Lee Patrick as Josie "Lou" La Rue
- Helen Westley as Mrs. Galloway, the landlady
- George Barbier as Mr. Marlin
- Nan Wynn as Flo Turner
- John Qualen as Dr. Patterson
- Walter Catlett as Mr. Simpson, Lacey's Department Store floorwalker
- Fay Helm as Mrs. Grayson
- Richard Carle as George
- John Ridgely as Ollie Ward
- Maris Wrixon as Diana Bennet
- James Burke as Callahan, Lacey's Department Store detective
- Charles Halton as John Parkinson
- John Sheffield as Alvie Grayson
- Jack Mower as Charlie

== Production ==
Producer David Lewis said the original story had a weak ending a problem they were never able to fix. Lewis said Olivia de Havilland wanted to play the lead but the role was given to Priscilla Lane. He called the film "program stuff and found its own market."

== Bibliography ==
- Fetrow, Alan G. Feature Films, 1940-1949: a United States Filmography. McFarland, 1994.
- Lewis, David (1993). The Creative Producer. Scarecrow Press.
- Vaughn, Stephen. Ronald Reagan in Hollywood: Movies and Politics. Cambridge University Press, 1994.
