= They All Come Out =

1939 film by Jacques Tourneur

- Theatrical release poster
- Directed by: Jacques Tourneur; E. J. Babille (assistant)
- Screenplay by: John C. Higgins
- Story by: John C. Higgins
- Produced by: Jack Chertok
- Starring: Rita Johnson; Tom Neal; Bernard Nedell; Edward Gargan; John Gallaudet; Addison Richards
- Cinematography: Clyde De Vinna; Paul C. Vogel
- Edited by: Ralph Goldstein
- Music by: David Snell; Edward Ward
- Production company: Metro-Goldwyn-Mayer
- Distributed by: Metro-Goldwyn-Mayer
- Release date: August 4, 1939
- Running time: 70 minutes
- Country: United States
- Language: English

They All Come Out is a 1939 American crime film directed by Jacques Tourneur, written by John C. Higgins, and starring Rita Johnson, Tom Neal, Bernard Nedell, Edward Gargan, John Gallaudet and Addison Richards. It was released on August 4, 1939, by Metro-Goldwyn-Mayer.

== Plot ==
The film opens in a documentary style with narration and the introduction of two government officials associated with the prison system, as themselves, talking across a desk in an office setting. The story is then presented as being based on events in the lives of many prisoners.

Kitty is involved with a gang planning a bank robbery when she meets and helps down-and-out Joe in a diner. Joe can't pay for what has been his first meal in three days, and has been unable to find work due to a broken wrist that was never set. Kitty recommends him for the bank robbery when a driver is needed. With the gang on the run from the law after the robbery, Kitty is shot and Joe saves her from being left behind. Eventually, the entire gang is captured.

The benevolent, compassionate, and highly effective prison system of 1939 offers help and understanding to all of the gang members, but only some—including Kitty and Joe—are willing to put their lives back on the right path. The prison doctor operates successfully on Joe's wrist and Kitty is allowed to correspond with Joe. After being paroled, both Kitty and Joe are immediately accepted and trusted in new jobs on the outside, but face challenges when another criminal attempts to draw them back into trouble.

== Cast ==
- Rita Johnson as Kitty
- Tom Neal as Joe Z. Cameron
- Bernard Nedell as Clyde "Reno" Madigan
- Edward Gargan as George Jacklin
- John Gallaudet as Albert Crane
- Addison Richards as Warden
- Frank M. Thomas as Superintendent
- George Tobias as 'Sloppy Joe'
- Ann Shoemaker as Dr. Ellen Hollis
- Charles Lane as Psychiatrist
- Adrian Morris as Judge in Kangaroo Court
