= A Child Is Born (film) =

1939 film by Lloyd Bacon

- Theatrical release poster
- Directed by: Lloyd Bacon
- Screenplay by: Robert Rossen
- Based on: Life Begins; 1932 play by Mary McDougal Axelson
- Produced by: Samuel Bischoff
- Starring: Geraldine Fitzgerald; Jeffrey Lynn; Gladys George; Gale Page; Spring Byington; Johnnie Davis
- Cinematography: Charles Rosher
- Edited by: Jack Killifer
- Music by: Heinz Roemheld
- Production company: Warner Bros. Pictures
- Distributed by: Warner Bros. Pictures
- Release dates: December 7, 1939 (Kansas City, Missouri); January 6, 1940 (U.S.)
- Running time: 79 minutes
- Country: United States
- Language: English

A Child Is Born is a 1939 American drama film directed by Lloyd Bacon and written by Robert Rossen. The film stars Geraldine Fitzgerald, Jeffrey Lynn, Gladys George, Gale Page, Spring Byington, and Johnnie Davis. The film was released by Warner Bros. Pictures on December 7, 1939. It was a remake of the 1932 film Life Begins starring Loretta Young. A further remake Love Story was made in Italy in 1942.

== Plot ==
Film about several mothers at hospital maternity ward. The nurses care for the mothers and their new born babies. The relationship that are formed with the mothers to be and the expectant fathers.

== Cast ==
- Geraldine Fitzgerald as Grace Sutton
- Jeffrey Lynn as Jed Sutton
- Gladys George as Florette
- Gale Page as Miss Bowers
- Spring Byington as Mrs. West
- Johnnie Davis as Ringer Banks
- Henry O'Neill as Dr. Lee
- John Litel as Dr. Brett
- Gloria Holden as Mrs. Kempner
- Johnny Downs as Johnny Norton
- Eve Arden as Miss Pinty
- Fay Helm as The Woman
- Louis Jean Heydt as Mr. Kempner
- Nanette Fabray as Gladys Norton
- Jean Sharon as Mrs. Banks
- Hobart Cavanaugh as Mr. West
- George Irving as Dr. Cramm
- Nella Walker as Mrs. Twitchell
- Winifred Harris as Mrs. Holt

== Censorship ==
Numerous regional censor boards heavily edited or banned the film because they believed its discussions of childbirth would frighten women from pursuing motherhood. British Columbia rejected the film because "The showing of this picture would have the effect of creating a fear in the minds of expectant mothers."
