= Corra White Harris House, Study, and Chapel =

Historic house in Georgia, United States

- U.S. National Register of Historic Places
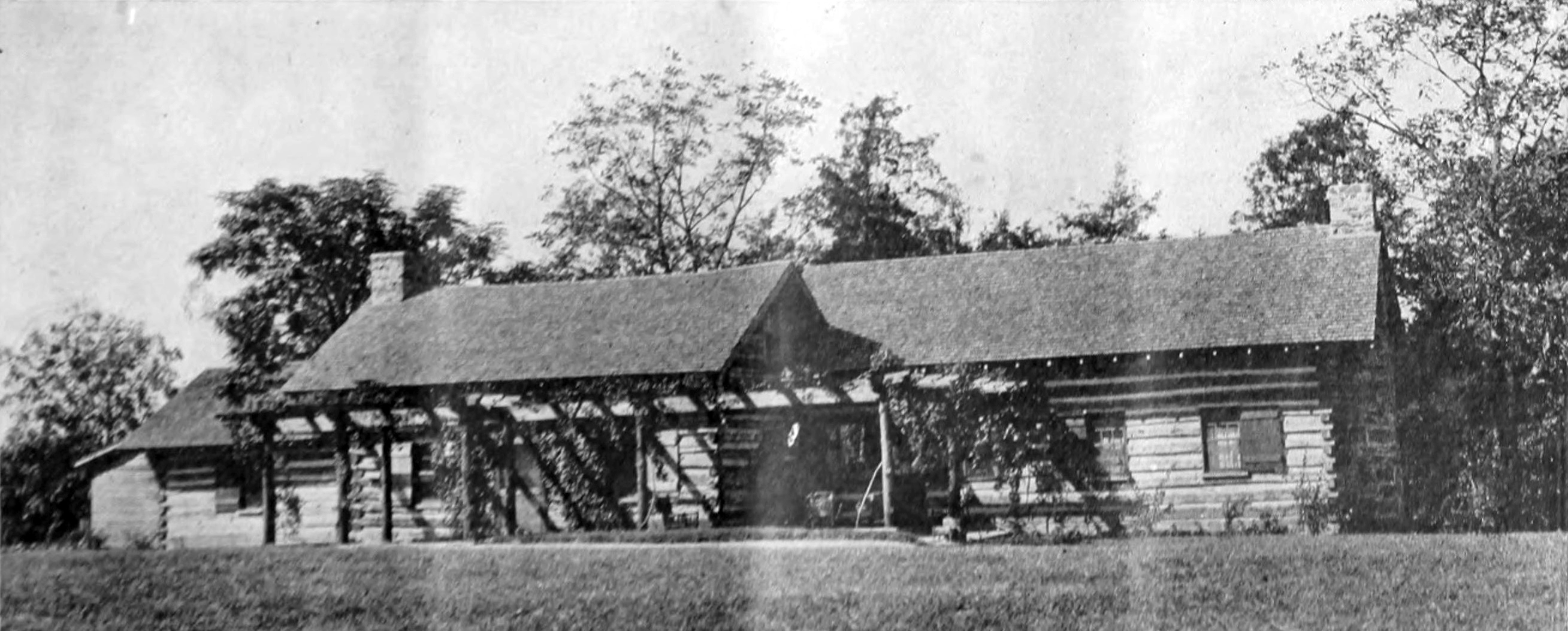
- Corra White Harris House in 1916

- Location within Georgia Location within the United States
- Location: 659 Mt. Pleasant Rd., NE., Rydal, Georgia
- Coordinates: 34.37093°N 84.76093°W
- Area: 57 acres (23 ha)
- Built: c.1830
- Architectural style: Log cabin
- NRHP reference No.: 97000249
- Added to NRHP: July 25, 1997

The Corra White Harris House, Study, and Chapel, also known as In the Valley, is a hilltop complex located in Rydal, Georgia.

It was home of Corra White Harris, a writer made famous by her 1910 book A Circuit Rider's Wife, which eventually became the 1951 film I'd Climb the Highest Mountain. She purchased the property in 1913 and died in 1935.

In 1916, she wrote "In the Valley", published in The Independent 87, pp. 123–124. She wrote about it in numerous other pieces, including in the follow articles with "Valley" in their titles:

- (1914). "New York as Seen from a Georgia Valley: In the Valley," The Independent 77, pp. 97–99.
- (1914). "The Valley: After New York," The Independent 79, pp. 63–65.
- (1915). "From the Peace Zone in the Valley," The Independent 81, pp. 190–192.
- (1916). "Politics and Prayers in the Valley," The Independent 87, pp. 135–136.
- (1917). "War Time in the Valley," The Independent 91, p. 471.

The center part of the house was reportedly built c. 1830 by Pine Log, a Cherokee chieftain.

The complex was listed on the National Register of Historic Places in 1997. A 57-acre (23 ha) area is listed with five contributing buildings and one other contributing structure.
