= Ladies Must Live =

Ladies Must Live may refer to:

- Ladies Must Live (1921 film), American silent societal drama
- Ladies Must Live (1940 film), American romantic comedy

== See also ==
- Ladies Must Love, 1933 American comedy-drama
