= A Night at the Ritz =

1935 film by William C. McGann

- Directed by: William C. McGann
- Written by: Manuel Seff; Albert J. Cohen; Robert T. Shannon
- Produced by: Samuel Bischoff
- Starring: William Gargan; Patricia Ellis; Allen Jenkins
- Cinematography: James Van Trees
- Edited by: Jack Killifer
- Music by: Leo F. Forbstein
- Production company: Warner Bros. Pictures
- Distributed by: Warner Bros. Pictures
- Release date: March 23, 1935
- Running time: 62 minutes
- Country: United States
- Language: English

A Night at the Ritz is a 1935 American comedy film directed by William C. McGann and starring William Gargan, Patricia Ellis and Allen Jenkins. The art direction was by Esdras Hartley. The film is of interest because the storyline, involving a con artist trying to profit off an impersonation, somewhat anticipates the more-famous Nothing Sacred two years later.

== Plot ==
Leopold Jaynos dreams of becoming a famous chef, despite the fact that he can't cook a whit. Fast-talking press agent Duke Regan, who's dating his sister Marcia, comes up with a scheme: He goes to the Ritz Hotel and tells manager Vincent that a world-famous Hungarian chef is coming to visit and to roll out the red carpet for him and his entourage (meaning Regan and sidekick Gyp). Vincent happily agrees, but with his own job on the line, begs Regan to get Leopold to become the new chef for the hotel. Problem: Regan doesn't know that Leopold can't really cook—those delicious meals he had at the Jaynos home were actually cooked by their mother.

== Cast ==
- William Gargan as Duke Regan
- Patricia Ellis as Marcia Jaynos
- Allen Jenkins as Gyp Beagle
- Dorothy Tree as Kiki Lorraine
- Erik Rhodes as Leopold Jaynos
- Berton Churchill as Stephen Vincent
- Gordon Westcott as Joe Scurvin
- Bodil Rosing as Mama Jaynos
- Arthur Hoyt as Mr. Hassler
- Paul Porcasi as Henri
- William B. Davidson as Connolly, an Editor
- Mary Treen as Isabelle, Hassler's Secretary
- Mary Russell as Miss Barry, Vincent's Secretary

== Bibliography ==
- Christine Gledhill. Stardom: Industry of Desire. Psychology Press, 1991.
