= She Gets Her Man =

She Gets Her Man may refer to:

- She Gets Her Man (1935 film), an American comedy film
- She Gets Her Man (1945 film), an American comedy film
