= Puddin' Head =

Puddin' Head or Pudd'nhead may refer to:

- the title character of Pudd'nhead Wilson, a Mark Twain novel, or the lost 1916 film adaptation of the same title
- Willie Jones (third baseman) (1925–1983), nicknamed "Puddin' Head", Major League Baseball third baseman
- Puddin' Head (film), a 1941 American comedy film
- a pejorative term used to describe someone of low intelligence
