= David Diamond (producer) =

American film producer (1900–1979)

David Diamond (1900–1979) was an American film producer.

== Select credits ==
- She Gets Her Man (1935)
- The Raven (1935)
- The Affair of Susan (1935)
- Swing It, Sailor! (1938)
- A Modern Marriage (1950)
- I Was an American Spy (1951)
- A Bullet for Joey (1954)
- The Phenix City Story (1955)
- Screaming Eagles (1955)
- Revolt in the Big House (1958)
- Operation Eichman (1961)
- The Big Bankroll (1961)
- Frigid Wife (1962)
- The Strangler (1964)
