= Our Leading Citizen (1939 film) =

1939 American film by Alfred Santel

- Theatrical release poster
- Directed by: Alfred Santell
- Screenplay by: Jack Moffitt
- Story by: Irvin S. Cobb
- Produced by: George M. Arthur
- Starring: Bob Burns; Susan Hayward; Joseph Allen; Elizabeth Patterson; Gene Lockhart; Charles Bickford
- Cinematography: Victor Milner
- Edited by: Hugh Bennett
- Music by: Gerard Carbonara
- Production company: Paramount Pictures
- Distributed by: Paramount Pictures
- Release date: August 23, 1939
- Running time: 89 minutes
- Country: United States
- Language: English

Our Leading Citizen is a 1939 American comedy film directed by Alfred Santell and written by Jack Moffitt. The film stars Bob Burns, Susan Hayward, Joseph Allen, Elizabeth Patterson, Gene Lockhart and Charles Bickford. The film was released on August 23, 1939, by Paramount Pictures.

== Cast ==
- Bob Burns as Lem Schofield
- Susan Hayward as Judith Schofield
- Joseph Allen as Clay Clinton
- Elizabeth Patterson as Aunt Tillie
- Gene Lockhart as J.T. Tapley
- Charles Bickford as Shep Muir
- Otto Hoffman as Mr. Stoney
- Clarence Kolb as Jim Hanna
- Paul Guilfoyle as Jerry Peters
- Fay Helm as Tonia
- Kathleen Lockhart as Mrs. Barker
- Hattie Noel as Druscilla
- Kathryn Sheldon as Miss Swan
- Monte Blue as Frank
- Jim Kelso as Chief of Police
- Harry C. Bradley as Director
- Frances Morris as Maid
- Thomas Louden as Frederick the Butler
- Olaf Hytten as Charles
- Phil Dunham as Janitor
- Gus Glassmire as Doctor
