= Esdras Hartley =

American art director (1892–1946)

- Born: September 3, 1892; New York, New York, United States
- Died: January 27, 1946; Los Angeles, California; United States
- Occupation: Art director
- Years active: 1923–1941 (film)

Esdras Hartley (1892–1946) was the art director for the 1935 film Don't Bet on Blondes. He worked on over a hundred films during his career, many of them at the Hollywood studio Warner Brothers.

== Selected filmography ==
- Miss Pacific Fleet (1935)
- A Night at the Ritz (1935)
- Bengal Tiger (1936)
- Times Square Playboy (1936)
- Talent Scout (1937)
- South of Suez (1940)
- River's End (1940)
- Ladies Must Live (1940)
- An Angel from Texas (1940)
- King of the Lumberjacks (1940)
- Three Cheers for the Irish ( 1940)
- The Case of the Black Parrot (1941)
- Flight from Destiny (1941)
- Highway West (1941)
- The Body Disappears (1941)
