= The Inspector General (1949 film) =

1949 film by Henry Koster

- Theatrical release poster
- Directed by: Henry Koster
- Screenplay by: Philip Rapp; Harry Kurnitz
- Based on: The Government Inspector; 1836 play by Nikolai Gogol
- Produced by: Jerry Wald
- Starring: Danny Kaye; Walter Slezak; Barbara Bates; Elsa Lanchester
- Cinematography: Elwood Bredell
- Edited by: Rudi Fehr
- Music by: Sylvia Fine (lyrics and music); Johnny Green (musical direction and incidental score)
- Production company: Warner Bros. Pictures
- Distributed by: Warner Bros. Pictures
- Release date: December 31, 1949
- Running time: 100 minutes
- Country: United States
- Language: English
- Budget: $2,873,000
- Box office: $3,910,000 $2.2 million (US rentals)

The Inspector General is a 1949 American Technicolor musical comedy film directed by Henry Koster and starring Danny Kaye, Walter Slezak, Barbara Bates, and Elsa Lanchester. Original music and lyrics are by the associate producer Sylvia Fine, who was married to Danny Kaye, with Johnny Green credited for musical direction and incidental score. The film is loosely based on Nikolai Gogol's play The Inspector General. The plot is re-located from the Russian Empire into an unspecified corrupt region of a European country that suddenly finds itself under the supervision of the First French Empire.

== Plot ==
The full film

Georgi, a naive and kind-hearted member of a band of Gypsies is kicked out by their leader Yakov after revealing to some villagers that the elixir they were peddling was fake. Tired and hungry, he wanders into the small town of Brodny. Whilst trying to eat from a horse's feedbag, he is arrested as a horse thief and sentenced to hang the next day.

Brodny is run by a corrupt Mayor whose underlings are all his equally corrupt relations. They are frightened when they learn that the Inspector General, an emissary appointed by Napoleon Bonaparte to weed out corruption, is in their region and known to come in disguise. They mistake Georgi for the Inspector, and they coddle him whilst trying to make him leave as soon as possible. Georgi reunites with Yakov, who poses as his advisor and reveals the suffering the Mayor inflicted on the townsfolk. To buy back a church organ the Mayor bought with the people's tax money and then sold to another town, Yakov convinces Georgi to collect bribes, but Yakov privately negotiates with the Mayor for a much larger sum. Meanwhile, the mayor's wife falls for Georgi, hoping he will whisk her away from her inattentive husband—though Georgi has fallen in love with Leza, the mayor's kitchen maid, who inspires him to be a good person and rescue the town.

At a party in his honor, Georgi narrowly avoids being exposed by a friend of the real Inspector General. The Mayor and his cronies plot to have Georgi killed, and they lure him to a barn for a woodcutter to murder him. Instead, Yakov learns of the plot beforehand, knocks Georgi unconscious, poses Georgi with his head through a hole in a table (as if he had been decapitated), and the Mayor pays him. Georgi awakens, stops Yakov from absconding with the money, and flees with Leza instead.

The real Inspector General arrives, and Georgi is arrested when he returns with Leza and the church organ. Yakov picks the Inspector's pocket for his credentials, briefly saving Georgi's life, but Georgi refuses to have the real Inspector executed and admits his true identity. Moved by his honesty, the Inspector gives Georgi the Mayor's chain of office and names him the new Mayor of Brodny, while telling the prior mayor "We'll put something else around your neck." Yakov becomes the new chief of police, Leza and Georgi become a couple, and the town celebrates Georgi's official appointment.

== Cast ==
- Danny Kaye as Georgi
- Walter Slezak as Yakov
- Barbara Bates as Leza
- Elsa Lanchester as Maria
- Gene Lockhart as The Mayor
- Alan Hale as Kovatch
- Walter Catlett as Colonel Castine
- Rhys Williams as Inspector General

=== Uncredited (in order of appearance) ===
- Buddy Roosevelt as Sentry
- Jeff York as Guard
- Joan Vohs as Peasant Girl
- Fred Kelsey as Villager
- Maudie Prickett as Townswoman
- Ida Moore as Old lady in the village
- Barbara Pepper as Buxom girl in the village
- Nestor Paiva as Gregor
- Jack Mower as Villager
- Paul Newlan as Viertel the woodchopper
- Herbert Heywood as Goatherd
- Byron Foulger as Burbis
- George Davis as Ladislaus
- Benny Baker as Telecki
- Jimmy Conlin as Jailer

== Score ==
Johnny Green won a Golden Globe for Best Motion Picture Score for his work on the film. Kaye's wife Sylvia Fine wrote the original songs "The Inspector General" and "Happy Times," both sung by Kaye in the film. "Happy Times" was, in fact, the working title of the film.

== Reception ==
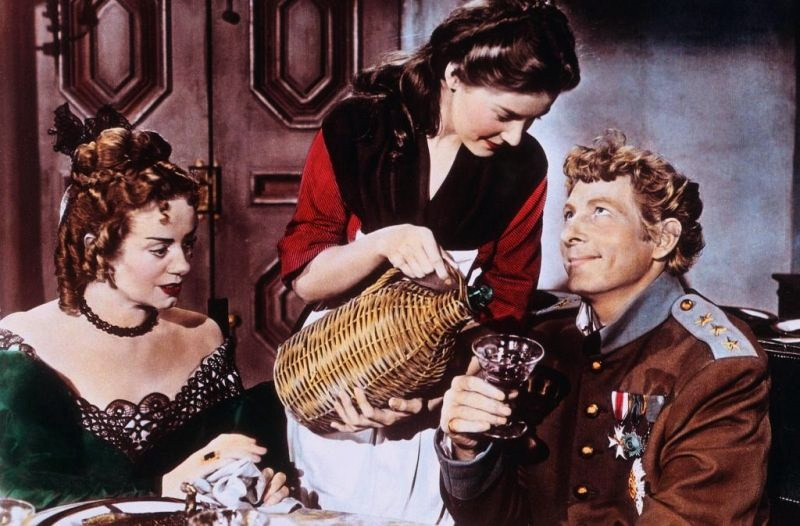
Elsa Lanchester, Barbara Bates, and Danny Kaye

=== Box Office ===
According to Warner Bros records the film earned $2,154,000 domestically and $1,756,000 foreign.

== Copyright status ==
The Inspector General is one of a number of major Hollywood productions from the 1940s and 1950s that have lapsed into the public domain in the United States. The last copyright holder was United Artists Television (later Metro-Goldwyn-Mayer, and finally Turner Entertainment) and later absorbed by Time Warner (later WarnerMedia & Warner Bros. Discovery).

== See also ==
- List of films in the public domain in the United States
- Revizor (film)
