= A Christmas Carol (1938 film) =

1938 American Christmas film directed by Edwin L. Marin

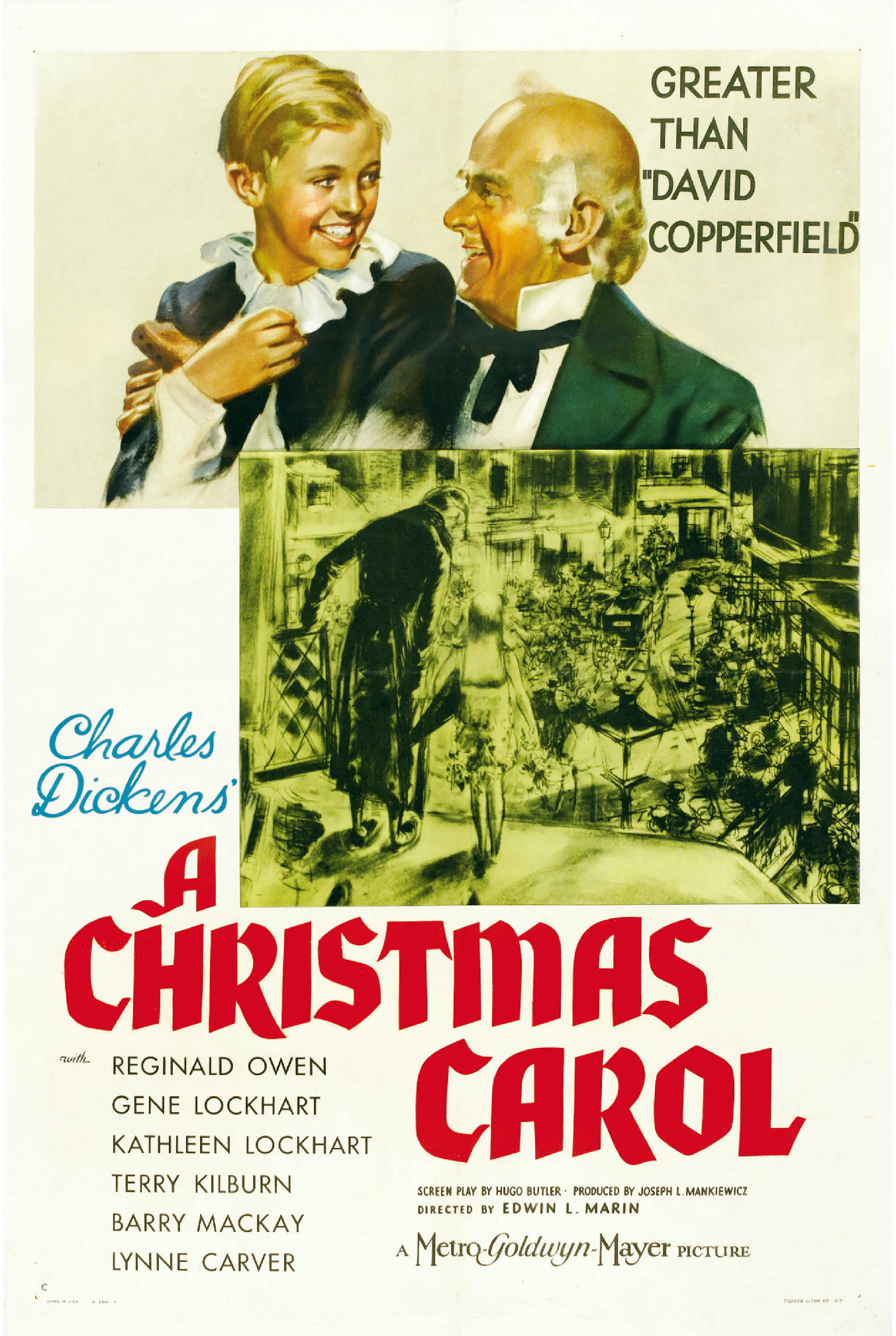
- Theatrical release poster
- Directed by: Edwin L. Marin
- Screenplay by: Hugo Butler
- Based on: A Christmas Carol; 1843 novella by Charles Dickens
- Produced by: Joseph L. Mankiewicz
- Starring: Reginald Owen; Gene Lockhart; Kathleen Lockhart; Terry Kilburn; Barry MacKay; Lynne Carver
- Cinematography: Sidney Wagner; John F. Seitz; (additional scenes, uncredited)
- Edited by: George Boemler
- Music by: Franz Waxman
- Production company: Metro-Goldwyn-Mayer
- Distributed by: Loew's, Inc.
- Release date: December 16, 1938
- Running time: 69 minutes
- Country: United States
- Language: English

A Christmas Carol is a 1938 American fantasy drama film adaptation of Charles Dickens's 1843 novella of the same name, starring Reginald Owen as Ebenezer Scrooge, an elderly miser who learns the error of his ways on Christmas Eve after visitations by three spirits. The film was directed by Edwin L. Marin from a script by Hugo Butler. A Christmas Carol has a 100% rating on the review-aggregator Rotten Tomatoes, based on 13 reviews. June Lockhart makes an uncredited appearance in this film.

== Plot ==
On Christmas Eve in 19th-century London, Ebenezer Scrooge's nephew Fred is sliding on ice on a sidewalk. He meets Peter and Tim Cratchit, sons of Scrooge's clerk, Bob Cratchit. When Fred reveals that Scrooge is his uncle, the boys take off in terror.

Fred soon arrives at the counting-house of the miserly Ebenezer. After declining an invitation from his nephew to dine with him on Christmas, Scrooge rudely dismisses two gentlemen collecting money for charity. That night, Scrooge reluctantly allows Bob to have Christmas off but orders him to come into work early the day after. Later Bob accidentally knocks off Scrooge's hat with a snowball. Scrooge fires him and withholds a week's salary to compensate for the ruined hat, also demanding a shilling to make up the difference. Bob spends the last of his wages on food for his family's Christmas dinner.

In his house, Scrooge is confronted by the ghost of his deceased business partner Jacob Marley, who warns Scrooge to repent of his wicked ways, or he will be condemned in the afterlife as Marley was. He tells Scrooge he will next be haunted by three spirits.

At 1 a.m, Scrooge is visited by the youthful Ghost of Christmas Past, who takes him back in time to his early life. Scrooge is shown his unhappiness when he was left to spend the holidays alone at school and his joy when his sister Fan came to take him home for Christmas. The spirit reminds Scrooge that Fan, dead for some years, is the mother of his nephew. Scrooge is shown his early career in business and money lending as an employee under the benevolent Fezziwig.

At two o'clock, Scrooge meets the merry Ghost of Christmas Present, who shows Scrooge how others keep Christmas. At a church service, Fred and his fiancée Bess are seen as happy and in love. The couple must wait to marry because of Fred's financial circumstances, and the spirit observes that perhaps they will not marry at all and that their love may end. Scrooge next sees the Cratchit home. Despite wearing a cheery manner for his family's sake, Bob is deeply troubled by the loss of his job, though he confides in no one except his daughter Martha. The spirit hints that Bob's youngest son Tim will die of a crippling illness by the same time next year if things do not change.

At 3 a.m., the Ghost of Christmas Yet to Come arrives, appearing as a silent, cloaked figure. The spirit shows Scrooge what will happen if he does not change. Scrooge discovers that Tiny Tim will die and his family mourn for him, while he himself will die alone and forgotten. Scrooge promises to repent and returns home to awaken in his own bed on Christmas Day.

Scrooge is a changed man. He asks a boy in the street to buy the large turkey in the butcher shop's window for him, meaning to take it to the Cratchits. Running into the two men who petitioned him for charity on Christmas Eve, Scrooge gives them a large donation. He visits Fred and makes him his new partner, then goes to the Cratchit house where he gives everyone gifts and rehires Bob with an increase in his wages.

== Cast ==
- Reginald Owen as Ebenezer Scrooge
- Gene Lockhart as Bob Cratchit
- Kathleen Lockhart as Mrs. Cratchit
- Terry Kilburn as Tiny Tim Cratchit (last surviving cast member)
- Barry MacKay as Fred (Scrooge's nephew)
- Lynne Carver as Bess (Fred's fiancée)
- Bunny Beatty as Martha Cratchit (uncredited)
- June Lockhart as Belinda Cratchit (uncredited)
- John O'Day as Peter Cratchit (uncredited)
- Leo G. Carroll as Marley's Ghost
- Ann Rutherford as Ghost of Christmas Past
- Lionel Braham as Ghost of Christmas Present
- D'Arcy Corrigan as Ghost of Christmas Yet to Come
- Ronald Sinclair as Young Scrooge
- Elvira Stevens as Fran Scrooge (uncredited)
- Forrester Harvey as Old Fezziwig (uncredited)
- Olaf Hytten as Schoolmaster (uncredited)
- Harry Cording as Waiter (uncredited)
- Halliwell Hobbes as Clergyman (uncredited)
- Charles Coleman as First Solicitor (uncredited)
- Matthew Boulton as Second Solicitor (uncredited)
- John Rogers as Chestnut Vendor (uncredited)
- Lydia Bilbrook as Fred's housemaid
- Clifford Severn as Boy Buying Turkey (uncredited)
- I. Stanford Jolley <ref>Mayer, Geoff . Encyclopedia of American Film Serials. McFarland. p. 162. ISBN 9780786477623</ref>

== Production ==
Lionel Barrymore had played the role of Scrooge on network radio annually since 1934. In May 1938 Metro-Goldwyn-Mayer planned to star him in a film version, with MGM child star Freddie Bartholomew as Tiny Tim. According to Robert Osborne, the late host of Turner Classic Movies, the goal was not to turn A Christmas Carol into a lavish MGM production as it was to simply get Barrymore's performance as Scrooge on film. The idea was tabled, then rescheduled in July 1938, as noted in the press: "Metro has revived plans to film Charles Dickens' Christmas Carol. It was announced earlier, but was abandoned when Freddie Bartholomew was deemed too old for the role of Tiny Tim. This part will now be played by Terry Kilburn, with Lionel Barrymore as Scrooge."

On September 28, 1938, syndicated press releases reported that MGM contract player Reginald Owen would play Jacob Marley opposite Lionel Barrymore's Ebenezer Scrooge. Only three days later, Barrymore was forced to withdraw due to of illness. Although plagued with advanced arthritis, Barrymore attributed his indisposition to a broken hip. Barrymore offered to play the part in a wheelchair, but the studio decided against it and offered to postpone production until the following year. Barrymore demurred, declaring "If the world ever needed Dickens's message of peace on earth, good will to men, it is now." Barrymore's observation came just as war clouds were looming over Europe.

With Barrymore absent from the project, the studio abandoned any plans for a major motion picture and mounted it as an economical "B" picture with a second-echelon cast of featured players instead of star names and a running time of only 69 minutes (especially short by MGM standards). Cast member June Lockhart confirmed that despite being an MGM production, it was "a 'B' picture". Reginald Owen took over the leading role of Scrooge, and he approved of the film's modest trappings: "Thank heaven it is being made as simply and sincerely as Dickens himself would have made it. It is not an epic, it is not colossal, it is simple and human and homely." Leo G. Carroll replaced Owen as Jacob Marley. Composer Franz Waxman was credited for the musical score, in contrast to the important MGM films of the period where music was credited to studio supervisor Herbert Stothart. A Christmas Carol was rushed into production in October 1938 and was finished in a matter of weeks.

Although Gene Lockhart was physically not a match for the Dickens' Bob Cratchit – Lockhart appears to be too prosperously well-fed for a starvation-salaried clerk – he was chosen for the film because he was known for hosting annual Hollywood Christmas parties in which he and his family staged readings of the Dickens story. Thus his wife Kathleen Lockhart and daughter June Lockhart, making her screen debut, were also cast in the film.

== Dramatic license ==
Hugo Butler's script streamlines the Dickens story in the interest of condensing the narrative for screen purposes. The film opens not in Scrooge's office but in the London streets where a lengthy prologue introduces Scrooge's nephew Fred. The characters of Fred and his fiancée Bess (his wife in the novelette) were greatly expanded to play up the romance that Dickens mentioned only in passing. The couple was played by Barry MacKay and Lynne Carver. It was one of Carver's few ingenue leads; she was usually seen in supporting roles in the studio's "B" features and featured roles in short subjects. Ann Rutherford, better known as Polly Benedict in the MGM Andy Hardy film series and as Carreen O'Hara in Gone with the Wind, was a young and attractive Ghost of Christmas Past, rather than the somewhat unusual creation that Dickens described.

In a scene invented for the screen, Bob Cratchit is shown teaching street urchins how properly to pack a snowball, and he lets loose at an unsuspecting target: Scrooge. Scrooge actually fires Cratchit rather than just threatening to do so. Scrooge's sister, named Fan in the original story, is renamed Fran in the film. Scrooge's own youthful romance is omitted from the screenplay, as is Scrooge's growing passion for money; these are summed up in a few lines of dialogue by the Ghost of Christmas Past. As the narrative speeds toward its conclusion, the two children symbolizing "Want" and "Ignorance" are omitted, as are the undertaker and charwomen redeeming Scrooge's possessions. As part of an ending that varies slightly from the Dickens work, the now repentant Scrooge makes Fred a partner in his firm, ensuring security for the nephew and his new bride. Screenwriter Butler is careful to include much of the Dickens dialogue verbatim, but he also simplifies many of the speeches.

== Promotion ==
Although Lionel Barrymore had withdrawn from the feature film, he did consent to appear in the coming-attractions trailer, titled A Fireside Chat with Lionel Barrymore. Barrymore tells the audience about the enduring Charles Dickens classic and the memorable character of Scrooge.

Barrymore was expected to repeat his annual radio performance of Scrooge in 1938, but in deference to MGM he withdrew from that commitment as well, yielding the radio role to Reginald Owen. This allowed MGM to promote Owen in the film then playing in theaters.

== Theatrical release ==
A Christmas Carol opened in December 1938 at New York City's Radio City Music Hall. In an early example of saturation booking—familiar from children's matinées of later years, where multiple local theaters all played the same picture—MGM made 375 prints of A Christmas Carol for widespread distribution to guarantee first-run playdates during the Christmas season. A Christmas Carol became a fixture in the regional MGM branch offices, where exhibitors could bring the film back to new audiences year after year.

== Reception ==
The Hollywood Reporter applauded the film: "MGM's classic contribution that definitely belongs in the Special Treat class. A fine, hardy perennial that should make the boxoffice bloom with health in its due and proper season. A really nice picture to be able to count on for the holiday season and special matinées. The production given it by Joseph Mankiewicz is a credit to MGM for the reason that it makes no attempt to be pretentious. In the direction of Edwin Marin, the same straightforward simplicity and homeliness are the things that make it a superior offering." Edwin Schallert of the Los Angeles Times took the film's dramatic liberties in stride: "The picture, even though it may seem to have some slight fantastic misadventures, still possesses all the qualities that should endear it to audiences... [Gene] Lockhart might have stepped from the Dickens page." The Boston Globe reviewer agreed with Schallert: "If there are any minor disappointments, as the too-Hollywood appearance of Ann Rutherford as a Christmas angel or the lack of certain scenes beloved in the Dickens story, the film as a whole makes up for them. The acting is near perfection, with Reginald Owen giving a remarkably convincing portrayal of the man who hated Christmas and the spirit of love. Gene Lockhart as Bob Cratchit does such a fine characterization that the audience is virtually in tears when he loses his job because of snowballing Old Scrooge." Nelson B. Bell of The Washington Post noted, "It is perhaps spun off at slightly too brisk a pace, but the warmly human quality of the imaginative tale, nevertheless, is its most welcomely obtrusive element." Bell also took exception to the Ghost of Christmas Past: "It is not Miss Rutherford's fault. Whosoever the blame, the fact remains that Miss Rutherford gives rather more the impression of a blonde glamour girl than the gentle spirit conceived by Dickens."

In a surprising turn of events for a Christmas-themed picture, A Christmas Carol continued to play in second-run neighborhood theaters through May 1939, and in Canada through June 1939. MGM re-released the film to theaters for dates in November and December 1939 and 1940. Local theaters booked it seasonally well into the 1940s, and MGM formally reissued it in 1949.

In 1955 the studio prepared an abridged version for its TV series MGM Parade. MGM first syndicated the entire feature to TV stations in 1956, and it became a perennial throughout the 1960s and 1970s (it was a staple of Chicago's Family Classics on WGN-TV). It ran in syndication through the 1990s until the advent of cable television. Since the late 1990s, it has been broadcast on Turner Classic Movies, airing several times during December.

== Home media ==
In 1988, MGM/UA Home Video and Turner Entertainment released A Christmas Carol on VHS celebrating its 50th anniversary, for the first time in a colorized version. The color version was released once again on VHS by Warner Home Video in 2000. On DVD, the original black-and-white version has seen multiple releases in various Christmas-movie boxed sets. A Blu-ray edition was released in November 2014.

== See also ==
- List of Christmas films
- List of ghost films
- List of A Christmas Carol adaptations
