= The Affair of Susan =

1935 film by Kurt Neumann

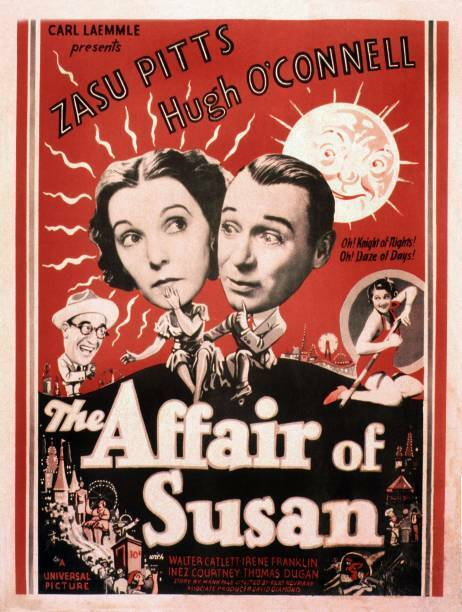
- Directed by: Kurt Neumann
- Written by: Mann Page; Clarence Marks; Andrew Bennison; H.M. Walker
- Produced by: David Diamond; Fred S. Meyer
- Starring: Zasu Pitts; Hugh O'Connell; Walter Catlett
- Cinematography: Norbert Brodine
- Edited by: Philip Cahn
- Music by: Score: Franz Waxman; Songs: Franz Waxman (music); Yip Harburg (lyrics)
- Production company: Universal Pictures
- Distributed by: Universal Pictures
- Release date: September 1, 1935
- Running time: 62 minutes
- Country: United States
- Language: English

The Affair of Susan is a 1935 American comedy film directed by Kurt Neumann and starring Zasu Pitts, Hugh O'Connell and Walter Catlett. It is a remake of the 1928 silent film Lonesome.

== Plot ==
Two lonely people meet at an amusement park on Coney Island.

== Cast ==
- Zasu Pitts as Susan Todd
- Hugh O'Connell as Dudley Stone
- Walter Catlett as Gilbert
- Tom Dugan as Jeff Barnes
- Inez Courtney as Mrs. Barnes
- James Burke as Hogan
- Nan Grey as Miss Skelly
- Irene Franklin as Miss Perkins
- William Pawley as Policeman

== Bibliography ==
- Lowe, Denise. An Encyclopedic Dictionary of Women in Early American Films: 1895-1930. Routledge, 2014.
