= Men Are Such Fools =

1938 film by Busby Berkeley

- Theatrical release poster
- Directed by: Busby Berkeley
- Screenplay by: Norman Reilly Raine; Horace Jackson
- Based on: Men Are Such Fools; 1936 novel by Faith Baldwin
- Produced by: Jack L. Warner
- Starring: Wayne Morris; Priscilla Lane; Humphrey Bogart; Hugh Herbert; Johnnie Davis; Penny Singleton
- Cinematography: Sidney Hickox Charles Schoenbaum
- Edited by: Jack Killifer
- Music by: Heinz Roemheld
- Production company: Warner Bros. Pictures
- Distributed by: Warner Bros. Pictures
- Release date: July 16, 1938
- Running time: 69 minutes
- Country: United States
- Language: English

Men Are Such Fools is a 1938 American romantic comedy directed by Busby Berkeley and written by Norman Reilly Raine and Horace Jackson. The film stars Wayne Morris, Priscilla Lane, Humphrey Bogart, Hugh Herbert, Johnnie Davis, and Penny Singleton. It was released by Warner Bros. Pictures on July 16, 1938. Men Are Such Fools is adapted from the novel with the same name by Faith Baldwin.

== Plot ==
Linda Lawrence skyrockets from a stenographer's desk to a job as account executive in an advertising agency. Although more interested in a career than in marriage, she falls in love with ex-football hero Jimmy Hall after his forceful courtship. They marry after Jimmy promises that he will not ask Linda to resign her position. Linda is pursued by her boss, Harvey Bates, and by Harry Galleon, a big radio contact man who can further her career if she will be "nice" to him. Jimmy becomes jealous, and Linda steps down to become a suburban housewife just as her name is becoming famous in the advertising and radio worlds.

Deciding that Jimmy is unambitious and content in a futureless job, Linda secretly promotes a junior partnership for him in an expanding firm. He refuses the job and she walks out on him, returning to her career. Jimmy accepts the partnership and becomes successful, crashing the newspaper chatter columns as a Broadway playboy. After waiting a year for Jimmy to get in touch with her, Linda announces a trip to Paris, ostensibly to get a divorce and marry Harry, who has converted his proposition to a proposal. That brings Jimmy on the run to stop her, which of course is what she wanted all along. Their reconciliation throws Harry into the arms of Beatrice Harris, a sardonic vamp whom he had cast aside years before.

== Cast ==
- Wayne Morris as Jimmie Hall
- Priscilla Lane as Linda Lawrence
- Humphrey Bogart as Harry Galleon
- Hugh Herbert as Harvey Bates
- Johnnie Davis as Tad Turkel
- Penny Singleton as Nancy
- Mona Barrie as Beatrice Harris
- Marcia Ralston as Wanda Townsend
- Gene Lockhart as Bill Dalton
- Kathleen Lockhart as Mrs. Dalton
- Donald Briggs as George Onslow
- Nedda Harrigan as Mrs. Nelson
- Eric Stanley as Mr. Nelson
- Claud Allister as Rudolf
- Renie Riano as Mrs. Pinkel (credited as Reine Riano)
- James Nolan as Bill Collyer (uncredited)
- Carole Landis as June Cooper (uncredited)
- Vivienne Osborne as Lili Arno (uncredited)

== Production ==
The film was produced by David Lewis who had just joined Warners from MGM. Lewis recalled:

There were several unusable scripts around, all trying to make a great deal out of a basically innocuous, though pleasant, piece of work. It was sort of a B-plus, a small budget picture, and I was assigned Norman Reilly Raine to write it... He stronglylacked a sense of dramatic construction... In time, Warren Duff, a staff writer who was a good organizer of material, came on the project and we finally gota script we could shoot. It was nothing to be proud of, but it was ready. Horace Jackson, a good dialogue writer, did some additional work that helped as well. All this took eight to ten weeks.

== Notes ==
- Lewis, David (1993). Curtis, James (ed.). The Creative Producer. Metuchen: Scarecrow Press. ISBN 0-8108-2720-4.
