= Hugh O'Connell =

American actor

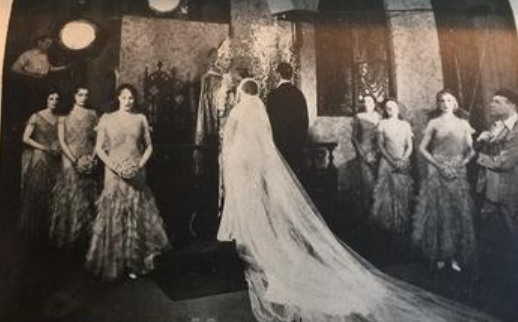
- O'Connell (extreme right) in the 1930 play Once in a Lifetime.
- Born: August 4, 1898; New York, New York; United States
- Died: January 19, 1943 (aged 44); Hollywood, California; United States
- Occupation: Actor
- Years active: 1929–1942 (film)

Hugh O'Connell (August 4, 1898 – January 19, 1943) was an American film actor and performed on Broadway.

== Early years ==
Hugh O'Connell was born on August 4, 1898, in New York City. After being orphaned at an early age, he went to live with a farmer near Green Bay, Wisconsin. He studied business at the Appleton Business College in Wisconsin. After working at a depot of the Northwestern Railroad, he became an usher at a theater in Chicago. The Cal Stewart Stock Company was playing at that venue, and when the troupe went on the road, he went with it.

== Career ==
O'Connell's experience with the Stewart company led to jobs with stock companies in Juneau, Alaska, the province of Saskatchewan in Canada, and other places. He left a touring troupe in Seattle, hoping to find better opportunities on the West Coast. When he failed to find such opportunities there and in San Francisco, he went East with another company and acted in "a lot of one-night stands" before joining road companies based in New York. His Broadway credits include Face Value (1921), Zeno (1923), Cousin Sonia (1925), The Wisdom Tooth (1926), Sure Fire (1926), Ballyhoo (1927), Fog (1927), The Racket (1927), Gentlemen of the Press (1928), Week-End (1929), Once in a Lifetime (1930), Face the Music (1932), A Saturday Night (1933), The Milky Way (1934), Ziegfeld Follies of 1936 (1936), and Run Sheep Run (1938). An Associated Press review of The Milky Way said it was "the best performance of Hugh O'Connell, who is undoubtedly the funniest actor on the stage ..."

== Personal life and death ==
O'Connell was married and had a son. He died on January 19, 1943, in Hollywood, California.

== Filmography ==
Year	Title	Role	Notes
1931	The Smiling Lieutenant	Niki's Orderly	
1931	Secrets of a Secretary	Charlie Rickenbacker	
1931	Personal Maid	Kipp	
1933	Broadway Through a Keyhole	Chuck Haskins	
1933	All at Sea		
1934	Gift of Gab	Patsy	
1934	Cheating Cheaters	Steve Wilson	
1934	Strange Wives	Warren	
1934	The Man Who Reclaimed His Head	Minor Role	Uncredited
1935	It Happened in New York	Greg Haywood	
1935	Chinatown Squad	Sergeant McLeash	
1935	Manhattan Moon	Speed	
1935	She Gets Her Man	Windy	
1935	The Affair of Susan	Dudley Stone	
1935	Diamond Jim	Charles B. Horsley	
1937	Ready, Willing, and Able	Truman Hardy	
1937	Fly-Away Baby	Hughie Sprague	
1937	Marry the Girl	Michael 'Mike' Forrester	
1937	The Footloose Heiress	John C. Allyn	
1937	That Certain Woman	Virgil Whitaker	
1937	The Perfect Specimen	Waldorf Hotel Clerk	
1938	Swing Your Lady	Smith	
1938	Accidents Will Happen	John Oldham	
1938	Torchy Blane in Panama	Skinner	
1938	Women Are Like That	George Dunlap	
1938	Mystery House	Newell Morse	
1938	Penrod's Double Trouble	Professor Caligostro	
1940	My Favorite Wife	Johnson - Insurance Adjuster	
1940	Lucky Partners	Niagara Clerk	
1941	The Mad Doctor	Lawrence Watkins	
1941	The People vs. Dr. Kildare	Process Server	Uncredited
1941	Puddin' Head	Kincaid	
1941	My Life with Caroline	Muirhead	
1941	Three Girls About Town	Chief of Police	
1941	Moonlight in Havana	Charlie	(final film role)

== Bibliography ==
- Fleming, E.J. Carole Landis: A Tragic Life in Hollywood. McFarland, 2005.
