= Career Woman (film) =

1936 film by Lewis Seiler

- Theatrical release poster
- Directed by: Lewis Seiler
- Screenplay by: Lamar Trotti
- Story by: Gene Fowler
- Produced by: Sol M. Wurtzel
- Starring: Claire Trevor; Michael Whalen; Isabel Jewell; Eric Linden; Virginia Field; Gene Lockhart
- Cinematography: Robert H. Planck; James Van Trees
- Edited by: Louis R. Loeffler
- Production company: 20th Century Fox
- Distributed by: 20th Century Fox
- Release date: December 18, 1936
- Running time: 76 minutes
- Country: United States
- Language: English

Career Woman is a 1936 American drama film directed by Lewis Seiler and written by Lamar Trotti. The film stars Claire Trevor, Michael Whalen, Isabel Jewell, Eric Linden, Virginia Field and Gene Lockhart. The film was released on December 18, 1936, by 20th Century Fox.

== Cast ==
- Claire Trevor as Carroll Aiken
- Michael Whalen as Barry Conant
- Isabel Jewell as Gracie Clay
- Eric Linden as Everett Clark
- Virginia Field as Fifi Brown
- Gene Lockhart as Uncle Billy Burly
- Edward Brophy as Doc Curley
- El Brendel as Chris Erleson
- Guinn "Big Boy" Williams as Bede Sanders
- Sterling Holloway as George Rogers
- Charles Middleton as Matt Clay
- Charles Waldron as Milt Clark
- Kathleen Lockhart as Mrs. Milt Clark
- Frank McGlynn, Sr. as Sheriff Duncan
- June Storey as Edith Clark
- Lynne Berkeley as Helen Clark
- Raymond Brown as Judge Hite
- George Meeker as Mr. Smith
- Howard Hickman as Judge Whitman
- Spencer Charters as Coroner McInery
- Erville Alderson as Dr. Anderson
- Eily Malyon as Miss Brinkerhoff
- Otto Hoffman as Frank Jackson
