= June Lockhart =

American actress (1925–2025)

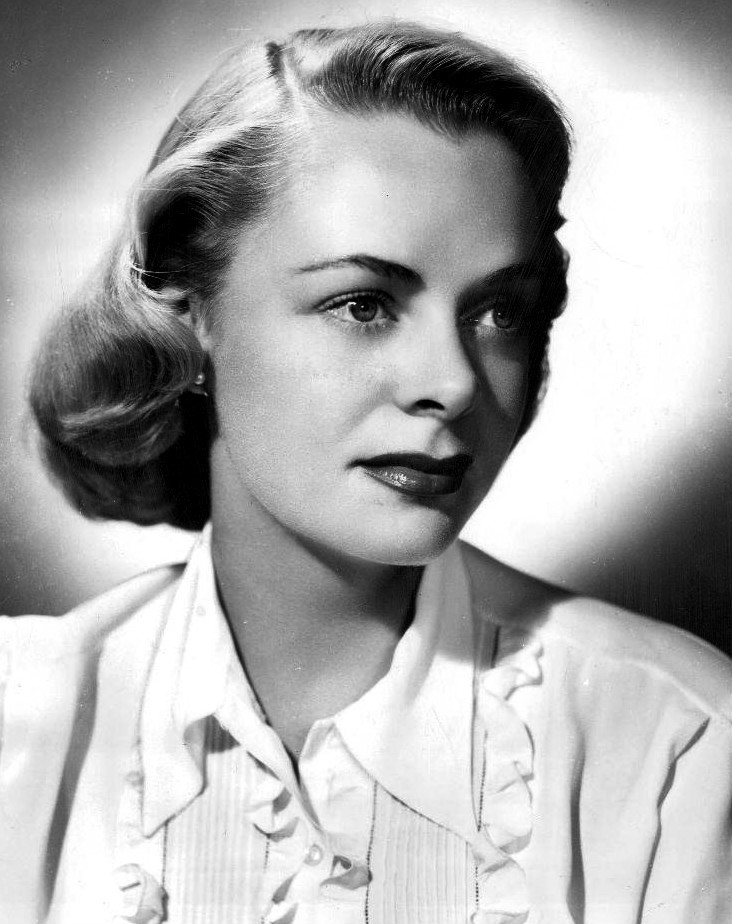
- Lockhart in 1947
- Born: June Kathleen Lockhart; June 25, 1925; New York City, U.S.
- Died: October 23, 2025 (aged 100); Santa Monica, California, U.S.
- Resting place: Holy Cross Cemetery, Culver City
- Education: Westlake School for Girls
- Occupation: Actress
- Years active: 1933–2021
- Known for: Lassie; Lost in Space
- Spouses: John F. Maloney (m. 1951; div. 1959); John Lindsay (m. 1959; div. 1970)
- Children: 2, including Anne
- Parents: Gene Lockhart (father); Kathleen Lockhart (mother)
- Awards: Special Tony Award

June Kathleen Lockhart (June 25, 1925 – October 23, 2025) was an American actress, beginning a film career in the 1930s and 1940s in films such as A Christmas Carol and Meet Me in St. Louis. She appeared primarily in 1950s and 1960s television and with performances on stage and in film. She became most widely known for her work on two television series, Lassie and Lost in Space, in which she played mother roles. Lockhart also portrayed Dr. Janet Craig on the CBS television sitcom Petticoat Junction (1968–70). She was a two-time Emmy Award nominee and a Tony Award winner. With a career spanning nearly 90 years, Lockhart was one of the last surviving actors from the Golden Age of Hollywood.

== Early life ==
June Kathleen Lockhart was born on June 25, 1925, in Manhattan in New York City. She was the daughter of Canadian-American actor Gene Lockhart, who came to prominence on Broadway in 1933 in Ah, Wilderness! and English-born actress Kathleen Lockhart (née Arthur). Her grandfather was John Coates Lockhart, "a concert-singer".

Lockhart attended the Westlake School for Girls in Beverly Hills, California.

== Film ==
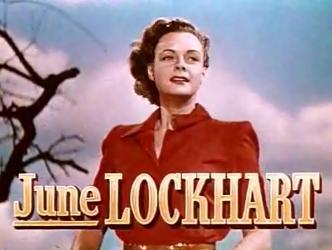
Lockhart in Son of Lassie (1945)

Lockhart made her film debut with her parents at age thirteen in a film version of A Christmas Carol in 1938. She also played supporting parts in All This, and Heaven Too (1940), Sergeant York (1941, as Alvin York's sister), Meet Me in St. Louis (1944), and The Yearling (1946). She played a key role in Son of Lassie (1945), a concept that she revisited at length during the television series Lassie more than a dozen years later. She was the top-billed star of She-Wolf of London (1946).

In 1986, Lockhart appeared in the fantasy film Troll. The younger version of her character in that film was played by her daughter, Anne Lockhart. They had previously played the same woman at two different ages in the "Lest We Forget" episode of the television series Magnum, P.I. (1981).

== Stage ==
Lockhart debuted on stage at the age of 8, playing Mimsey in Peter Ibbetson, presented by the Metropolitan Opera. In 1947, her acting in For Love or Money brought her out of her parents' shadow and gained her notice as "a promising movie actress in her own right". One newspaper article began, "June Lockhart has burst on Broadway with the suddenness of an unpredicted comet."

In 1951, Lockhart starred in Lawrence Riley's biographical play Kin Hubbard opposite Tom Ewell.

== Television ==
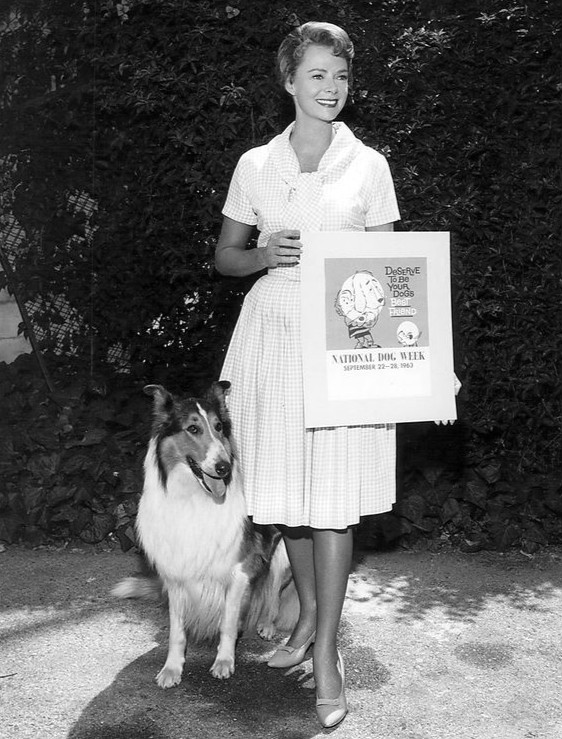
Lockhart as Ruth Martin in Lassie (1963)

In 1955, Lockhart appeared in an episode of CBS's Appointment with Adventure. About this time, she also made several appearances on NBC's legal drama Justice, based on case files of the Legal Aid Society of New York. In the late 1950s, Lockhart guest-starred in several popular television Westerns, including Wagon Train (in the episode "The Ricky and Laura Bell Story") and Cimarron City (in the episode "Medicine Man" with Gary Merrill) on NBC, Gunsmoke, Have Gun – Will Travel, and Rawhide on CBS.

In 1958, Lockhart was the narrator for Playhouse 90's telecast of the George Balanchine version of Tchaikovsky's The Nutcracker, featuring Balanchine himself as Drosselmeyer, along with the New York City Ballet.

Lockhart is also famous for her roles as TV mothers, first as Ruth Martin, the wife of Paul Martin (portrayed by Hugh Reilly) and the mother of Timmy Martin (played by Jon Provost) in the 1950s CBS series Lassie (a role that she played from 1958 to 1964). She replaced actress Cloris Leachman, who in turn had replaced Jan Clayton. Following her five-year run on Lassie, Lockhart made a guest appearance on Perry Mason as defendant Mona Stanton Harvey in "The Case of the Scandalous Sculptor". Lockhart then starred as Dr. Maureen Robinson in Lost in Space, which ran from 1965 to 1968 on CBS, opposite veteran actors Guy Williams and Jonathan Harris.

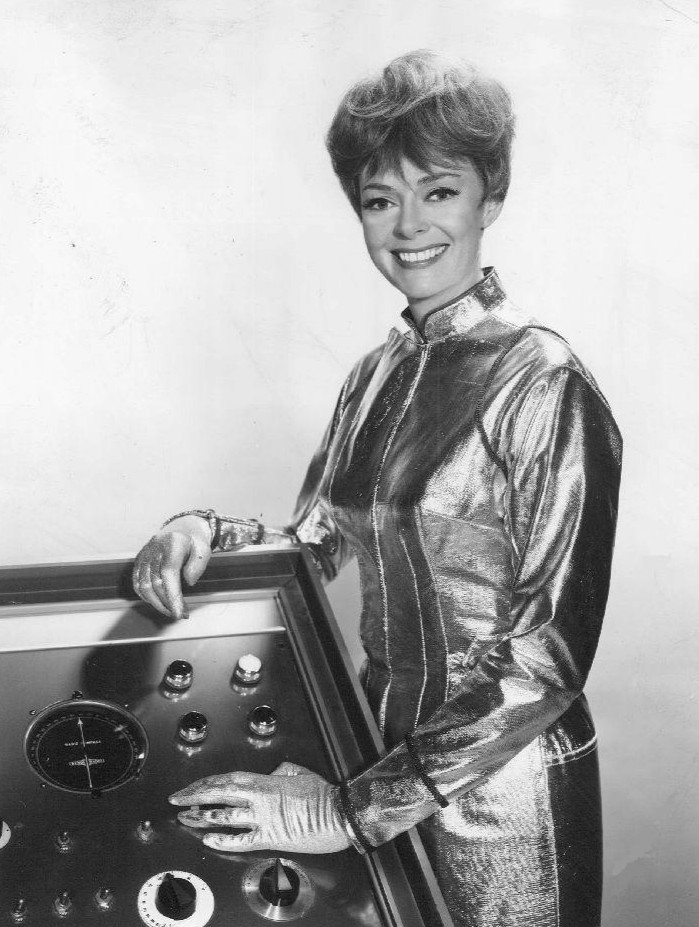
Lockhart played Maureen Robinson in the sci-fi series Lost in Space (1965–1968)

In 1965, Lockhart played librarian Ina Coolbrith, first poet laureate of California, in the episode "Magic Locket" of the syndicated Western series Death Valley Days. She then appeared as Dr. Janet Craig on the final two seasons of the CBS sitcom Petticoat Junction (1968–1970); her character was brought in to fill the void created after Bea Benaderet died during the run of the show. Lockhart was a regular in the ABC soap opera General Hospital during the 1980s and 1990s, and was also a voice actress, providing the voice of the lead character in the Hanna-Barbera animated series These Are the Days on ABC for one season in 1974.

Lockhart appeared as a hostess for CBS broadcasts of the Miss USA Pageant for six years, the Miss Universe Pageant for six years, the Tournament of Roses Parade for eight years, and the Thanksgiving Parade for five years.

In 1991, Lockhart appeared as Miss Wiltrout, Michelle Tanner's kindergarten teacher, on the TV sitcom Full House. She also had a cameo in the 1998 film Lost in Space, based on the television series in which she had starred 30 years earlier. In 2002, she appeared in two episodes of The Drew Carey Show as Lewis's mother, Misty Kiniski.

In 2004, Lockhart voiced the role of Grandma Emma Fowler in Focus on the Family's The Last Chance Detectives audio cases. Lockhart starred as James Caan's mother in an episode of Las Vegas and subsequently guest-starred in episodes of Cold Case and Grey's Anatomy, in the 2007 ABC Family television film Holiday in Handcuffs, and in the 2007 feature film Wesley as Susanna Wesley, mother of the founder of Methodism, John Wesley.

In May 2014, Lockhart appeared in Tesla Effect, a video game that combines live-action footage with three-dimensional graphics.

== Personal life and death ==
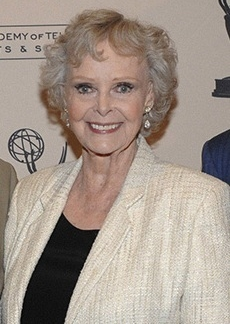
Lockhart in 2009

In 1951, Lockhart married John F. Maloney. They had two daughters, Anne Kathleen and June Elizabeth. The couple divorced in 1959. She married architect John Lindsay that same year, but they divorced in October 1970 and she never remarried. A Roman Catholic, Lockhart and her daughter Anne and actress Kay Lenz met Pope John Paul II in 1985.

Lockhart had a lifelong fascination with American presidential candidates and the media's coverage of them. Her friend reporter Merriman Smith arranged for her to travel with both major-party candidates Dwight D. Eisenhower and Adlai Stevenson during the 1956 presidential election and again with both campaigns in the 1960 election. Between 1957 and 2004, Lockhart attended many presidential briefings.

Although a child of the Greatest Generation, Lockhart embraced rock music and listened to emerging rock bands. In an interview, her Lost in Space co-star Bill Mumy stated that she took Angela Cartwright and him to the Whisky a Go Go nightclub in Hollywood "to hang out with The Allman Brothers Band". Appearing on The Virginia Graham Show in 1970 with Art Metrano and LGBT cleric Troy Perry, Lockhart confronted Graham about her moralizing tone toward gay people.

Lockhart died of natural causes in her sleep at her home in Santa Monica, California, on October 23, 2025, at age 100.

== Recognition ==
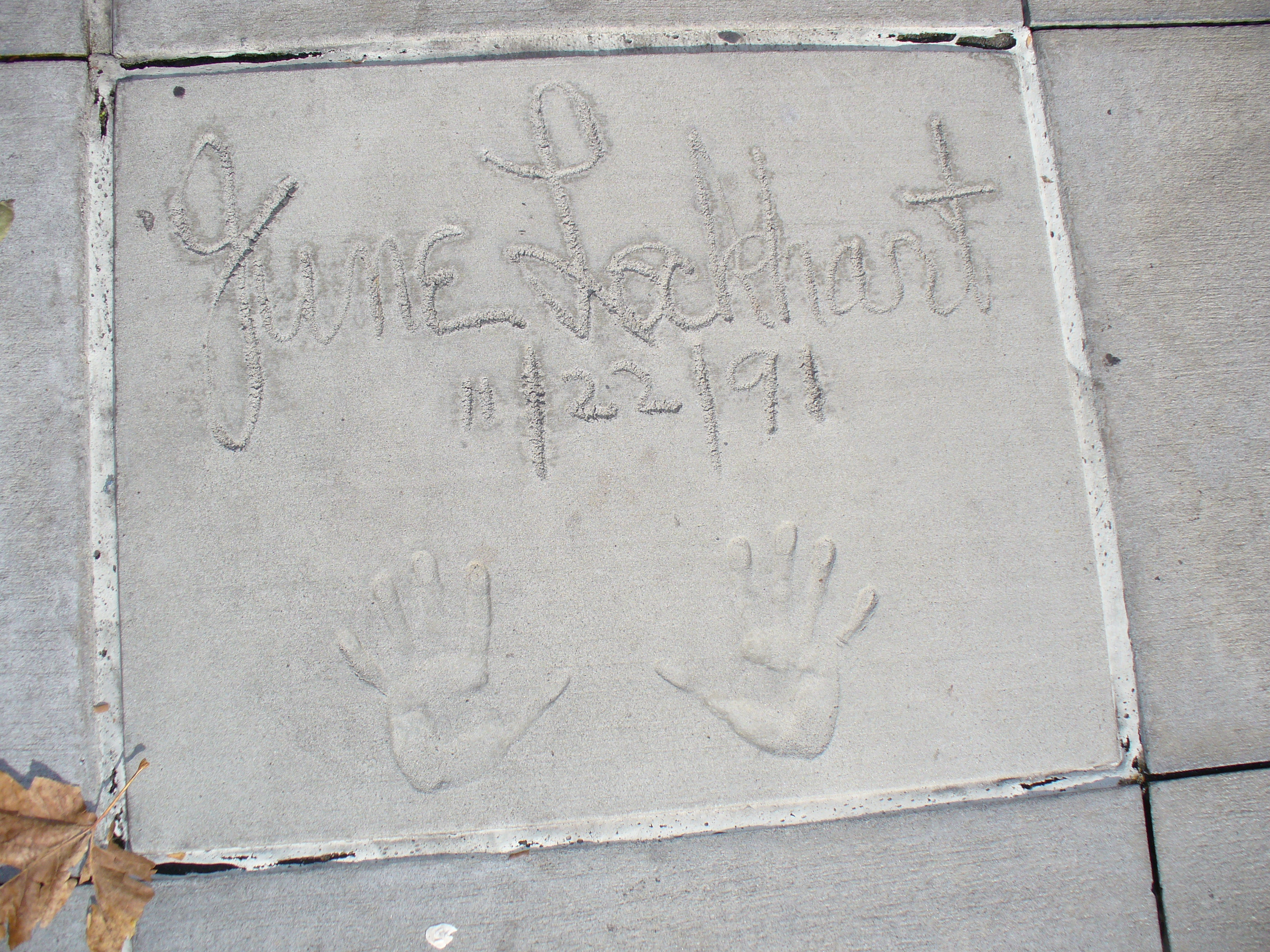
The handprints of June Lockhart in front of Hollywood Hills Amphitheater at Walt Disney World's Disney's Hollywood Studios theme park

In 1948, Lockhart received a Special Tony Award for Outstanding Performance by a Newcomer (a category that no longer exists) for her role on Broadway in For Love or Money. Lockhart donated her Tony Award to the Smithsonian Institution in 2008 for display in the permanent entertainment archives of the National Museum of American History.

Lockhart was nominated for two Emmy awards. In 1953, she was nominated for Best Actress. In 1959, she was nominated for Best Actress in a Leading Role (Continuing Character) in a Dramatic Series for her role in Lassie.

Lockhart has two stars on the Hollywood Walk of Fame, one for motion pictures (6323 Hollywood Boulevard) and one for television (6362 Hollywood Boulevard). Both were dedicated on February 8, 1960. In 2013, the National Aeronautics and Space Administration (NASA) awarded her the Exceptional Public Achievement Medal for inspiring the public about space exploration.

== Partial filmography ==
=== Films ===
Year	Film	Role	Notes	Refs.
1938	A Christmas Carol	Belinda Cratchit		
1940	All This, and Heaven Too	Isabelle		
1941	Adam Had Four Sons	Vance		
1941	Sergeant York	Rosie York		
1942	Miss Annie Rooney	Stella Bainbridge		
1943	Forever and a Day	Girl in air raid shelter	Alternate title: The Changing World	
1944	Meet Me in St. Louis	Lucille Ballard		
1944	The White Cliffs of Dover	Betsy Kenney at age 18	Uncredited	
1945	Keep Your Powder Dry	Sarah Swanson		
1945	Son of Lassie	Priscilla		
1946	She-Wolf of London	Phyllis Allenby		
1947	Bury Me Dead	Barbara Carlin		
1947	It's a Joke, Son!	Mary Lou Claghorn		
1947	T-Men	Mary Genaro		
1957	Time Limit	Mrs. Cargill		
1981	Peter-No-Tail	Mother	Voice, English version	
1982	Butterfly	Mrs. Gillespie		
1982	Deadly Games	Marge		
1982	Aladdin and the Magic Lamp	Aladdin's Mother	Voice, English version	
1983	Strange Invaders	Mrs. Bigelow		
1986	Troll	Eunice St. Clair		
1988	Rented Lips	Archie's mother		
1989	C.H.U.D. II: Bud the C.H.U.D.	Gracie		
1989	The Big Picture	Janet Kingsley		
1991	Dead Women in Lingerie	Ma		
1994	Sleep with Me	Caroline		
1998	Lost in Space	Principal Cartwright		
1999	Deterrence	Secretary of State Clift		
2000	The Thundering 8th	Margaret Howard		
2001	One Night at McCool's	Bingo Player	Uncredited	
2009	Wesley	Susanna Wesley		
2009	Super Capers	Mother		
2012	Zombie Hamlet	Hester Beauchamps		
2016	The Remake	Irene O'Connor		
2019	Bongee Bear and the Kingdom of Rhythm	Mindy the Owl	Voice	

=== Television ===
Year	Title	Role	Notes	Refs.
1949	The Ford Theatre Hour	Amy March	1 episode	
1952	Hallmark Hall of Fame	Dolly Madison	Episode: Mistress of the White House	
1956	Science Fiction Theatre	Eve Patrick	Episode: "Death at My Fingertips"	
1957	The Joseph Cotten Show	Julie Baggs	1 episode	
1957	The Kaiser Aluminum Hour	Verna	1 episode	
1957	Have Gun – Will Travel	Dr. Phyllis Thackeray	2 episodes	
1958	Shirley Temple's Storybook	Beauty's Sister	Episode: "Beauty and the Beast"	
1958	Wagon Train	Sarah Drummond	Episode: "The Sarah Drummond Story"	
1958	NBC Matinee Theater	Connie	1 episode	
1958	Gunsmoke	Beula	Episode: "Dirt"	
1958	Playhouse 90	Narrator	1 episode	
1958–1964	Lassie	Ruth Martin	200 episodes	
1959	Rawhide	Rainy Dawson	Episode: "Incident at Barker Springs"	
1959	General Electric Theater	Vera	1 episode	
1960	Wagon Train	Laura Bell	Episode: "The Ricky and Laura Bell Story"	
1964	Perry Mason	Mona Stanton Harvey	Episode: "The Case of the Scandalous Sculptor"	
1964	Bewitched	Mrs. Burns	Episode: "Little Pitchers Have Big Ears"	
1964	Voyage to the Bottom of the Sea	Dr. Ellen Bryce	Episode: "The Ghost of Moby Dick"	
1964	The Man from U.N.C.L.E.	Sarah Taub	Episode: "The Dove Affair"	
1965	Branded	Mrs. Sue Pritchett	Episode: "The Vindicator"	
1965	Death Valley Days	Miss Ina Coolbrith	Episode: "The Magic Locket"	
1965	The Alfred Hitchcock Hour	Martha	Episode: "The Second Wife"	
1965	Mr. Novak	Mrs. Nelby	Episode: "Once a Clown"	
1965–1968	Lost in Space	Maureen Robinson	84 episodes	
1968–1970	Petticoat Junction	Dr. Janet Craig	45 episodes	
1968	Family Affair	Miss Evans	3 episodes	
1971	The Man and the City	Ellen Lewis	1 episode	
1974	Marcus Welby, M.D.	Lila	1 episode	
1974	Adam-12	Mrs. Whitney	Episodes: "Camp" Part 1 & 2	
1974	These Are the Days		1 season	
1975	Ellery Queen	Claudia Wentworth	1 episode	
1975	New Zoo Revue	Penelope Potter	1 episode	
1976	Happy Days	Judge MacBride	1 episode	
1976	Quincy, M.E.	Clara Rhoades	1 episode	
1978	The Hardy Boys/Nancy Drew Mysteries	Mrs. Migley	Episode: "The Pirates"	
1981	Vega$	Dr. Michaels	1 episode	
1981	Magnum, P.I.	Diane Westmore Pauley	1 episode	
1981	Darkroom	Margo Haskell	Episode: "Uncle George"	
1982	Falcon Crest	Mara Wingate	1 episode	
1982	Knots Landing	Hilda Grant	1 episode	
1981	The Greatest American Hero	Mrs. Davidson	2 episodes	
1984	Whiz Kids	Mrs. Butterfield	1 episode	
1984	The Night They Saved Christmas	Mrs. Claus	TV movie	
1985	Murder, She Wrote	Beryl Hayward	1 episode	
1985; 1992; 1993	General Hospital	Mariah Ramirez	14 episodes	
1986	The Colbys	Dr. Sylvia Heywood	2 episodes	
1986	Hotel	Betty Archer	1 episode	
1986	Amazing Stories	Mildred	Episode: "The Pumpkin Connection"	
1987	Pound Puppies	Aunt Millie	1 episode	
1989	The New Lassie	Mrs. Chadwick	1 episode	
1991	Full House	Miss Wiltrout	2 episodes	
1992	Danger Island	Kate	TV movie	
1993	The John Larroquette Show	John's mother	1 episode	
1994	The Mommies	Bev – Barb's Mom	1 episode	
1994	Babylon 5	Dr. Laura Rosen	Episode: "The Quality of Mercy"	
1994	'Tis The Season: A Hawaiian Christmas Story	Mrs. Livingston	Television film	
1994	The Ren & Stimpy Show	Dr. Brainchild's Mother	1 episode	
1995	The Critic	Herself	1 episode	
1995	The Colony	Mrs. Billingsley	Television film	
1995	Duckman	Oppressed Wife	1 episode	
1995	Roseanne	Leon's mother	1 episode	
1995	Out There	Donna	Television film	
1996	Step by Step	Helen Lambert	3 episodes	
1997	7th Heaven	Veterinarian	1 episode	
1997	Beverly Hills, 90210	Celia Martin	4 episodes	
2001	Au Pair II	Grandma Nell Grayson	Television film	
2002	The Drew Carey Show	Misty Kiniski	2 episodes	
2003	Andy Richter Controls the Universe	Grandma Evelyn	1 episode	
2004	Complete Savages	Grammy Na-Na	2 episodes	
2004	Las Vegas	Bette Deline	1 episode	
2006	Grey's Anatomy	Agnes	1 episode	
2006	Cold Case	Muriel Bartleby	1 episode	
2007	Holiday in Handcuffs	Grandma	Television film	
2021	Lost in Space	June, aka the Voice of Alpha Control	1 episode; Netflix series	

== See also ==
- List of centenarians (actors, filmmakers and entertainers)

== Sources ==
- Dye, David (1988). Child and Youth Actors: Filmographies of Their Entire Careers, 1914-1985. McFarland. p. 132. ISBN 978-0-89950-247-2.
- Inman, David (1991). The TV Encyclopedia. Perigee Books. pp. 531–532. ISBN 978-0-399-51704-4.
- Lentz, Harris (1997). Television Westerns Episode Guide. McFarland & Co. p. 61. ISBN 0786403772.
- Lentz, Harris M. (2001). Science Fiction, Horror & Fantasy Film and Television Credits. McFarland. p. 362. ISBN 978-0-7864-0942-6.
- Monush, Barry (2003). The Encyclopedia of Hollywood Film Actors: From the Silent Era to 1965. Hal Leonard Corporation. pp. 432–433. ISBN 1-55783-551-9.
- Romanko, Karen A. (2025). "Coolbrith, Ina (1841–1928)". Historical Women on Television: Portrayals of 120 Notable Figures in Scripted Programs. McFarland. ISBN 978-1-4766-5597-0.
- Tate, Marsha Ann; Houser, Earl (2022). What America Watched: Television Favorites from the Cornfields to the Cosmos, 1960s-1990s. McFarland. p. 236. ISBN 978-1-4766-4465-3.
- Weaver, Tom (1995). They Fought in the Creature Features. McFarland. p. 197. ISBN 978-1-4766-1686-5.
