= Penrod's Double Trouble =

1938 film by Lewis Seiler

- Theatrical release poster
- Directed by: Lewis Seiler
- Screenplay by: Crane Wilbur
- Based on: Penrod; 1914 novel by Booth Tarkington
- Produced by: Bryan Foy
- Starring: Billy Mauch; Bobby Mauch; Dick Purcell; Gene Lockhart; Kathleen Lockhart; Hugh O'Connell
- Cinematography: Arthur L. Todd
- Edited by: Frank DeWar
- Music by: Howard Jackson
- Production company: Warner Bros. Pictures
- Distributed by: Warner Bros. Pictures
- Release date: July 23, 1938
- Running time: 61 minutes
- Country: United States
- Language: English

Penrod's Double Trouble is a 1938 American comedy film directed by Lewis Seiler, written by Crane Wilbur, and based on stories by Booth Tarkington. The film stars Billy Mauch, Bobby Mauch, Dick Purcell, Gene Lockhart, Kathleen Lockhart and Hugh O'Connell. The film was released by Warner Bros. Pictures on July 23, 1938.

== Cast ==
- Billy Mauch as Penrod Schofield
- Bobby Mauch as Danny Dugan
- Dick Purcell as Tex Boyden
- Gene Lockhart as Mr. Frank Schofield
- Kathleen Lockhart as Mrs. Laura Schofield
- Hugh O'Connell as Professor Caligostro
- Charles Halton as Mr. Bitts
- Bernice Pilot as Delia
- Jackie Morrow as Rodney Bitts
- Philip Hurlic as Verman
- Lillian Yarbo as Mrs. Washington (uncredited)
