= A Bullet for Joey =

1955 film by Lewis Allen

- Theatrical Poster
- Directed by: Lewis Allen
- Screenplay by: Daniel Mainwaring; A. I. Bezzerides
- Story by: James Benson Nablo
- Produced by: Samuel Bischoff; David Diamond
- Starring: Edward G. Robinson; George Raft; Audrey Totter
- Cinematography: Harry Neumann
- Edited by: Leon Barsha
- Music by: Harry Sukman
- Production company: Bischoff-Diamond Corporation
- Distributed by: United Artists
- Release date: April 15, 1955 (U.S.)
- Running time: 87 minutes
- Country: United States
- Language: English

A Bullet for Joey is a 1955 film noir directed by Lewis Allen and starring Edward G. Robinson and George Raft. The picture involves a gangster who sneaks into Canada to kidnap a scientist for the communists. The supporting cast features Audrey Totter, Peter van Eyck, George Dolenz and Peter Hansen.

== Plot ==
Communist agents in Canada are spying on Dr. Carl Macklin, an atomic physicist whose knowledge they want to steal. To kidnap him, Eric Hartman, the party's top man in Montreal, offers $100,000 to deported American criminal Joe Victor.

Joe's former flame Joyce Geary is blackmailed into helping with the plan. Police inspector Leduc of the Royal Canadian Mounted Police investigates. A thug working for Victor kills the scientist's secretary after using her to gain information. Leduc is taken prisoner aboard a ship as Hartman and Victor attempt to take Dr. Macklin with them to Europe.

Leduc pleads with Victor, who misses his native country, to do the right thing and help stop the communists. A shootout ensues between Victor and Hartman and they kill each other. Joyce's innocence is proven to the satisfaction of Leduc and the law.

== Cast ==
- Edward G. Robinson as Inspector Leduc
- George Raft as Joe Victor
- Audrey Totter as Joyce Geary
- Peter van Eyck as Eric Hartman
- George Dolenz as Dr. Carl Macklin
- Peter Hansen as Fred
- Sally Blane as Marie Tremblay
- Bill Bryant as Jack Allen
- Alan Wells as Armand

== Production ==
The film was originally titled Canada's Great Manhunt. It was inspired by a magazine article by Stephen Brott. The article was built into a full story by James Benson Nablo, and it was optioned by Samuel Bischoff and David Diamond. Geoffrey Homes wrote the script and George Raft and Edward G. Robinson were signed to play the leads. Gloria Grahame was sought to play the female lead.

Filming began on December 10, 1954. Robinson and Raft each paid writer A. I. Bezzerides to assist with their dialogue.

== Release ==
A Bullet for Joey was released in New York on April 15, 1955. The film was released in London at the Exhibitors' Trade Show on April 7, 1955 and in Australia on March 16, 1956.

== Reception ==
Dorothy Masters of the New York Daily News wrote: "The story is laid right on the line in a semi-documentary style. It begins well, accumulating a lot of tension in the crescendo, but overextends on the climax, by which time the tally of corpses is nearing astronomical figures. Although the presentation is not geared to thespian indulgences, Robinson manages to convey conviction and authority in his portrayal."

Fred W. Fox of the Los Angeles Mirror wrote: "'A Bullet for Joey' may not be Oscar fare but it is neat melodrama that holds the spectator's attention."

John L. Scott of the Los Angeles Times called the film a "moderately exciting crime thriller" with a "somewhat lugubrious plot."

== Home video ==
A Bullet for Joey was released on Blu-ray in November 2015 and on DVD by Kino Lorber Studio Classics on July 10, 2007 and November 17, 2015.

== See also ==
- List of American films of 1955
