= A Circuit Rider's Wife =

1910 novel by Corra May Harris

A Circuit Rider's Wife is a 1910 novel by Corra May Harris that is thought to be largely autobiographical, Circuit rider here meaning a travelling clergyman. It was published by Henry Altemus Company in Philadelphia. The book is Harris's best known work.

The book was made into the successful 1951 film, I'd Climb the Highest Mountain.
