= Highway West =

1941 film

- Directed by: William C. McGann
- Written by: Charles Kenyon; Kenneth Gamet
- Based on: Heat Lightning; 1933 play by George Abbott; Leon Abrams
- Produced by: Edmund Grainger
- Starring: Brenda Marshall; Arthur Kennedy; William Lundigan
- Cinematography: Ted D. McCord
- Edited by: Jack Killifer
- Music by: William Lava
- Production company: Warner Bros. Pictures
- Distributed by: Warner Bros. Pictures
- Release date: August 7, 1941
- Running time: 64 minutes
- Country: United States
- Language: English

Highway West is a 1941 American crime film directed by William C. McGann and starring Brenda Marshall, Arthur Kennedy and William Lundigan. It is a remake of the 1934 film Heat Lightning. It was produced and distributed by Warner Bros. Pictures. The film's sets were designed by the art director Esdras Hartley.

== Plot ==
A woman discovers that her apparently respectable businessman husband is in fact a notorious bank robber.

== Cast ==
- Brenda Marshall as Claire Foster
- Arthur Kennedy as George Foster
- William Lundigan as Dave Warren
- Olympe Bradna as Myra Abbott
- Slim Summerville as Gramps Abbott
- Noel Madison as Salvo - Henchman
- Dorothy Tree as Salvo's Moll
- Willie Best as Bub Wellington
- Pat Flaherty as Eddie - Motorcycle Cop
- Frank Wilcox as Murph - Motorcycle Cop
- John Ridgely as Alex - Armored Car Guard
- William B. Davidson as Gorman
- Dick Rich as Mike - Trucker at Cafe
- James Westerfield as Swede - Trucker at Cafe
- Victor Zimmerman as Jake
- Creighton Hale as Waiter
- Jack Mower as Police Patrolman
- Paul Panzer as Gas Station Attendant
- Frank Mayo as Police Patrolman
- Wade Boteler as Sheriff at Cafe-Bar

== Bibliography ==
- Goble, Alan. The Complete Index to Literary Sources in Film. Walter de Gruyter, 1999.
