= Kathleen Lockhart =

English actress

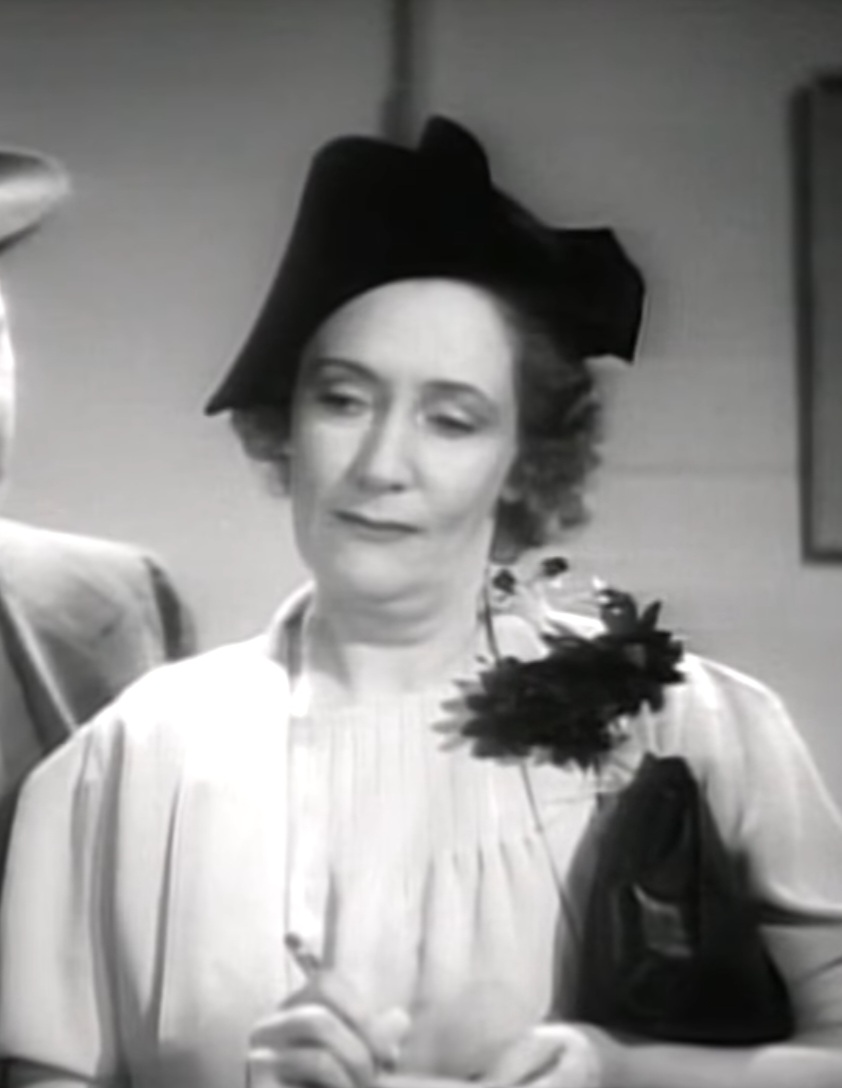
- Lockhart in Something to Sing About (1937)
- Born: Kathleen Arthur; 9 August 1894; Southsea, Hampshire, England
- Died: 18 February 1978 (aged 83); Los Angeles, California, U.S.
- Resting place: Holy Cross Cemetery, Culver City, California
- Occupation: Actress
- Years active: ?–1960
- Spouse: Gene Lockhart (m. 1924; died 1957)
- Children: June Lockhart
- Relatives: Anne Lockhart (granddaughter)

Kathleen Lockhart (née Arthur; 9 August 1894 – 18 February 1978) was a prolific English-American stage and screen actress and musician, having started her career in theatre in her native United Kingdom, she emigrated to the United States where she appeared in productions for nearly forty years.

== Early life ==
Kathleen Arthur was born on 9 August 1894 in Southsea, Hampshire, England.

== Career ==
Lockhart's entertainment career began on the stage in Britain. In June 1935 she appeared in Lea Freeman's comedy "A Widow in Green," directed by Dickson Morgan, and starring Grace Stafford, Daisy Belmore, and others at Harold Lloyd's Beverly Hills Little Theatre for Professionals, a showcase for those moving from stage to screen. Lockhart later appeared on stage and in Hollywood films for almost forty years. Lockhart has more than 30 film credits.

Lockhart and her husband, Gene, occasionally starred opposite each other, most notably as Mr. and Mrs. Bob Cratchit in A Christmas Carol (1938). Lockhart's daughter, June also appeared with them in that film, portraying one of their daughters.

After 1957, Lockhart retired from acting and made no more film appearances, except for a small role in The Purple Gang (1960).

Lockhart has a star on the Hollywood Walk of Fame at 6241 Hollywood Boulevard.

== Personal life ==
In 1924, Lockhart immigrated to the United States. Lockhart's husband was Canadian-American actor Gene Lockhart (died 1957). The Lockharts had a daughter, June Lockhart, and a granddaughter Anne Lockhart, both actresses.

On 18 February 1978, Lockhart died in Los Angeles, California, following a long illness. Lockhart is buried at Holy Cross Cemetery in Culver City.

== Partial filmography ==
- 1936: Brides Are Like That as Mrs. Ella Robinson
- 1936: Times Square Playboy as Lottie Bancroft.
- 1936: The Devil is a Sissy as Mrs. Murphy
- 1936: Mr. Cinderella as Aunt Penelope 'Penny' Winfield.
- 1936: Career Woman as Mrs. Milt Clark
- 1937: Something to Sing About as Miss Amy Robbins
- 1938: Men Are Such Fools as Mrs. Dalton
- 1938: Penrod's Double Trouble as Mrs. Laura Schofield
- 1938: Give Me a Sailor as Mrs. Hawks (scenes deleted)
- 1938: Blondie as Mrs. Miller
- 1938: A Christmas Carol as Mrs. Cratchit
- 1938: Sweethearts as Aunt Amelia
- 1939: What a Life as Mrs. Pike
- 1939: Man of Conquest as Mrs. Allen
- 1939: Outside These Walls as Miss Thornton
- 1939: Our Leading Citizen as Mrs. Barker
- 1939: What a Life as Miss Pike
- 1941: Love Crazy as Mrs. Bristol
- 1942: Are Husbands Necessary? as Laura Atterbury
- 1943: Mission to Moscow as Lady Chilston (uncredited)
- 1943: The Good Fellows as Mary Hilton
- 1943: Lost Angel as Mrs. Catty
- 1945: Roughly Speaking as Mrs. Henrietta Louise Randall
- 1945: Bewitched as Mrs. Ann Ellis
- 1946: Two Years Before the Mast as Mrs. Gordon Stewart (uncredited)
- 1946: The Strange Woman as Mrs. Partridge
- 1946: Lady in the Lake as Mrs. Grayson
- 1947: Mother Wore Tights as Mrs. Clarkman (uncredited)
- 1947: Gentleman's Agreement as Mrs. Jessie Minify (uncredited)
- 1949: The Sickle or the Cross as Martha Deems
- 1950: The Big Hangover as Mrs. Parkford (uncredited)
- 1951: I'd Climb the Highest Mountain as Mrs. Brock
- 1952: Plymouth Adventure as Mary Brewster (uncredited)
- 1953: Confidentially Connie as Mrs. Martha Magruder
- 1953: Walking My Baby Back Home as Mrs. Millard
- 1953: The Glenn Miller Story as Mrs. Miller
- 1960: The Purple Gang as Nun (final film role)

== See also ==
- List of stars on the Hollywood Walk of Fame
