= Confidentially Connie =

1953 film by Edward Buzzell

- Directed by: Edward Buzzell
- Screenplay by: Max Shulman
- Story by: Max Shulman; Herman Wouk
- Produced by: Stephen Ames
- Starring: Van Johnson; Janet Leigh; Louis Calhern
- Cinematography: Harold Lipstein
- Edited by: Frederick Y. Smith
- Music by: David Rose
- Production company: Metro-Goldwyn-Mayer
- Distributed by: Loew's Inc.
- Release date: March 13, 1953
- Running time: 74 minutes
- Country: United States
- Language: English
- Budget: $502,000
- Box office: $733,000

Confidentially Connie is a 1953 American romantic comedy film directed by Edward Buzzell. It stars Van Johnson as a dedicated, but poorly paid college professor, Janet Leigh as his pregnant wife, and Louis Calhern as Johnson's father, whose schemes to get his son to return to the family ranch in Texas widen the previously existing gulf between father and son when they deprive him of a desirable promotion and a much needed raise.

== Plot ==
Maine housewife Connie Bedloe is pregnant, but the family's limited income from her husband Joe's college teaching job means that they can't buy the meat her obstetrician recommends. Connie gives up smoking to be able to afford lamb chops. Joe does not buy her explanation that she is doing this because she is pregnant, because the obstetrician's office is “like a forest fire.” He is not providing for her: He talks about going back to his father's cattle ranch, the “second biggest in Texas,” despite his father's interfering ways. The daughter of a teacher, Connie knew what she was getting into. However, she does want the apolitical Joe to lobby for a new job opening. He makes a mess of it, and they begin an ongoing debate: Go to the ranch, or stay in the home they love and raise a child without the security money can bring.

Joe's father, Opie, comes to visit, determined to persuade Joe to move the family back to the ranch. A dedicated and inspiring teacher, Joe is wounded by his father's contempt for his work. (Teaching is fit only for women who can't find husbands.) He eloquently defends the work of American teachers, asking, rhetorically, why teachers are paid less than TV repairmen.

Opie is delighted to learn that Connie is pregnant and horrified to see her eating fish. Believing that pregnant women “gotta have meat,” he arranges for the local butcher, Spangenberg, to cut his prices in half, to 69 cents a pound, (with Opie paying the difference) so that Connie can have the meat she needs. Connie sees through Opie immediately, but gives in, using a gigantic steak to impress the Dean and others. At the party, the guests find out that the butcher sold the steak to Opie at half price. The next day, they all head to Spangenberg's: A price war ensues in town. Seeing the way the faculty react—one professor says he has not seen a rib roast since 1948–Opie starts to rethink his attitude toward teachers.

When Connie tells Opie that Joe will stay if he gets the promotion, Opie lies to the Dean, telling him his son plans to leave at end of term. The promotion goes to another man, who calls Joe to share the news. It looks as if Opie has won, but Spangenberg storms in, begging Opie to make up the losses of the other butchers. Joe is angry, but Connie defends Opie for putting meat on their table. They agree to go to the ranch, The next morning a group of students comes with a going away present. One of them, a football player, gives an eloquent speech thanking Joe, who is touched—and puzzled. They just decided. The students tell how they went to the Dean, to complain. He told them he would have given the job to Joe, but Opie said his son was leaving. Joe tells his students that he and Connie will be there until they are retired. Opie packs to leave.

At a special meeting, the Dean announces a generous anonymous endowment that will fund $1,000 a year in raises for all the teachers. Joe is furious. He knows Opie is behind it. The Dean tries to calm him, speaking seriously about the difference that $1,000 ($10,000 today) can make in the life of a family: “the difference between living in dignity and living on the ragged edge…It can turn a man sour. It can make him small, and petty, and mean. I know.”

Joe arrives at the train station, ready for a fight, as Opie's train is boarding. Opie tells Joe that he set up the endowment after seeing what happened during the meat price war. He was horrified that people as important as teachers were treating meat like pure gold. Yes, he has changed. It took some time. The train leaves.

Cut to the ranch. Opie goes to welcome Joe, Connie and his grandson, Opie T. (for, T-bone.) Bedloe, here for their regular summer vacation at the ranch. “I came along just in time,” Opie says. “Your name might have been Sardine.”

== Cast ==
- Van Johnson as Joe Bedloe
- Janet Leigh as Connie Bedloe
- Louis Calhern as Opie Bedloe
- Walter Slezak as Emil Spangenberg, Butcher
- Gene Lockhart as Dean Edward E. Magruder
- Marilyn Erskine as Phyllis Archibald
- Hayden Rorke as Prof. Simmonds
- Robert Burton as Dr. Willis Shoop
- Kathleen Lockhart as Mrs. Martha Magruder
- Arthur Space as Prof. Archie Archibald
- Barbara Ruick as Barbara
- June Whitley Taylor as Betty Simmons
- Emory Parnell as Mr. Daveney
- Kathleen O'Malley as Nurse
- Byron Foulger as Prof. Rosenberg
- Kathleen Freeman as Mother of Twins
- Mae Clarke as Happy Shopper

== Reception ==
According to MGM records the film made $574,000 in the US and Canada and $159,000 elsewhere, resulting in a loss of $51,000.

In May 1953, The New York Times reported several times on a list created by the Schools Motion Picture Committee, “a voluntary organization composed of teachers and parents of pupils in local public and private elementary and high schools” of films suitable for children 8 to 14 years old. Confidentially Connie was on the list.
