= Times Square Playboy =

1936 film by William C. McGann

- Directed by: William C. McGann
- Written by: Roy Chanslor
- Based on: The Home Towners (1926 play) by George M. Cohan
- Produced by: Hal B. Wallis
- Starring: Warren William; June Travis; Barton MacLane
- Cinematography: L. William O'Connell
- Edited by: Jack Killifer
- Music by: Leo F. Forbstein; Heinz Roemheld
- Production company: Warner Bros. Pictures
- Distributed by: Warner Bros. Pictures
- Release date: May 9, 1936
- Running time: 62 minutes
- Country: United States
- Language: English

Times Square Playboy is a 1936 American romance film directed by William C. McGann and starring Warren William, June Travis and Barton MacLane. It is based on the 1926 play Hometowners by George M. Cohan, and was produced and distributed by Warner Bros. Pictures. It is also known by the alternative title of His Best Man. The film's art direction was by Esdras Hartley, its costume design by Orry-Kelly.

== Plot ==
Hardworking New York City stockbroker Vic Arnold is elated to announce at a business meeting that Beth Calhoun has agreed to marry him. He invites his best friend, Ben "Pig Head" Bancroft, to come from his home town of Big Bend, Indiana, to be his best man.

However, Ben becomes convinced that the much younger Beth is only marrying Vic for his money and that she is secretly still attached to college football star and admirer Joe Roberts, who is about her age. Despite the efforts of his wife Lottie, he accuses Beth of being a gold digger, and her brother Wally and their parents of complicity. Insulted, Beth makes Vic choose between them. Vic refuses to give up his best friend, so Beth gives him back his engagement ring.

Later, Ben finds out he was mistaken. Wally returns a $40,000 bracelet Vic gave Beth; he also reveals that Joe, who has repeatedly proposed to Beth, is actually much richer than Vic. However, when Vic opens the jewelry case, it is empty. The Calhouns show up to defend themselves from the insinuation that Beth kept the bracelet. Ben then admits he hid it in order to bring everybody together. He even resorts to putting Wally in a half nelson to get him to stay and listen to his heartfelt apology. In the end, he succeeds in reuniting the couple.

== Cast ==
- Warren William as Victor "Vic" Arnold
- June Travis as Beth Calhoun, aka Fay Melody
- Barton MacLane as Casey, Vic's butler / trainer
- Gene Lockhart as P.H. Ben "Pig Head" Bancroft
- Kathleen Lockhart as Lottie Bancroft
- Dick Purcell as Wally Calhoun
- Craig Reynolds as Joe Roberts
- Granville Bates as Mr. Mort Calhoun
- Dorothy Vaughan as Mrs. Nellie Calhoun

== Reception ==
The New York Times gave the film a lukewarm review, calling it "a noisy comedy which manages to be alternately amusing and dull" and "suffers in the main because it is too reverent an adaptation of the parent work", though the "principal rôles are in capable hands and are played for what they are worth by Warren William and Gene and Kathleen Lockhart".
