= Barbara Bates =

American actress (1925–1969)

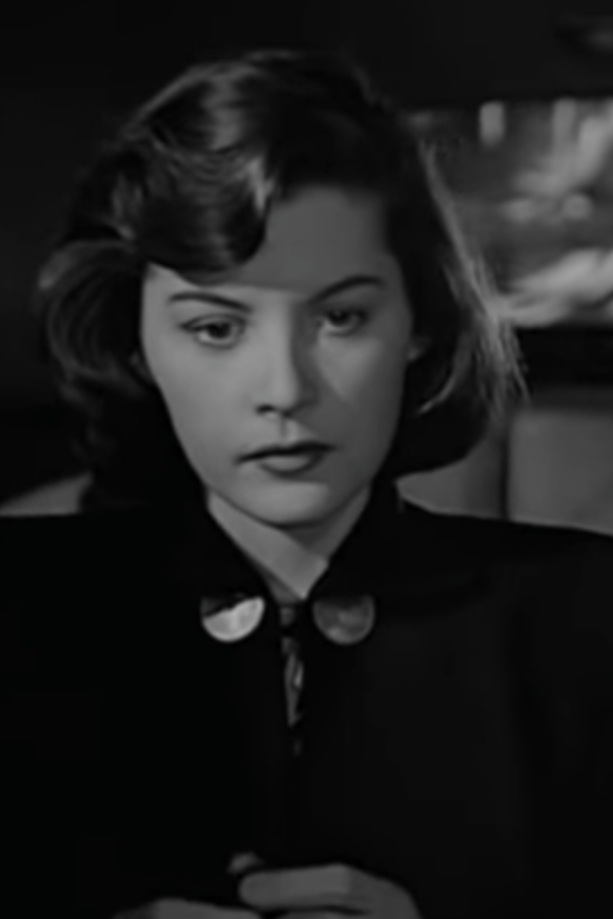
- Bates in Quicksand (1950)
- Born: Barbara Jane Bates; August 6, 1925; Denver, Colorado, U.S.
- Died: March 18, 1969 (aged 43); Denver, Colorado, U.S.
- Resting place: Crown Hill Cemetery, Jefferson County, Colorado
- Occupation: Actress
- Years active: 1945–1962
- Spouses: Cecil Coan (m. 1945; died 1967) William Reed (m. 1968)

Barbara Jane Bates (August 6, 1925 – March 18, 1969) was an American singer and actress, most notable for her portrayal of Phoebe in the 1950 drama film All About Eve and as Katy Morgan on It's a Great Life (1954–1956).

== Early life ==
The eldest of three daughters, Bates was born in Denver, Colorado. While growing up in Denver, she studied ballet and worked as a teen fashion model. The shy teen was persuaded to enter a local beauty contest and won, receiving two round-trip train tickets to Hollywood, California. Two days before returning to Denver, Bates met Cecil Coan (1903–1967), a United Artists publicist, whom she would later marry.

== Career ==
In September 1944, 19-year-old Bates signed a contract with Universal Pictures after Cecil Coan introduced her to producer Walter Wanger. Soon after, she was cast as one of the "Seven Salome Girls" in the 1945 drama, Salome Where She Danced starring Yvonne De Carlo. Around this time, she fell in love with Coan, who was married with two sons and two daughters. In March 1945, Coan divorced his wife Helen Coan and secretly married Bates, on March 25, 1945, in Chihuahua, Mexico. Bates spent the next few years as a stock actress, landing bit parts in movies and doing cheesecake layouts for magazines such as Yank, the Army Weekly and Life. One of those photo sessions caught the eye of executives at Warner Bros., which signed her in 1947. Warner Bros. highlighted her "girl-next-door" image and her acting career took off. She appeared with some of the biggest stars of the day, including Bette Davis in June Bride and Danny Kaye in The Inspector General.

In 1949, Bates's contract with Warner Bros. was terminated when she refused to go to New York City to promote The Inspector General. Despite being fired by Warner Bros., she signed a contract with 20th Century-Fox later that year.

In late 1949, Bates auditioned for the small role of Phoebe in Fox's upcoming All About Eve. In competition for the part were Zsa Zsa Gabor and others, but Bates impressed the producers and was given the part. She made a short but important appearance as the devious schemer, Phoebe, at the end of the film. Bates's image is enshrined in the film's last scene, posing in front of a three-way mirror, while holding the award won by her idol Eve Harrington, played by Anne Baxter. This memorable final scene left critics and audiences intrigued by the young actress, who they thought would star in a sequel to All About Eve. The Hollywood Reporter said of her performance, "Barbara Bates comes on the screen in the last few moments to more or less sum up the whole action and point of the story. It's odd that a bit should count for so much, and in the hands of Miss Bates, all the required points are fulfilled."

After her appearance in All About Eve, Bates co-starred in Cheaper by the Dozen, and its sequel Belles on Their Toes, with Jeanne Crain and Myrna Loy. In 1951, she landed a role opposite MacDonald Carey and Claudette Colbert in the comedy Let's Make It Legal. Fox refused to lend out Bates for the role of the suicidal ballerina saved by Charlie Chaplin's aging vaudevillian in Limelight (1952). She co-starred with Donna Reed as the love interests of Dean Martin and Jerry Lewis in the 1953 hit comedy The Caddy.

== Decline ==
Despite a seemingly successful career, Bates's life, both on and off screen, started unravelling. She became a victim of extreme mood swings, insecurity, ill health, and chronic depression. In 1954, she won the role of Cathy on the NBC sitcom It's a Great Life, co-starring Frances Bavier as her mother, Amy Morgan, and James Dunn as her uncle, Earl Morgan. After 26 episodes, she was written out of the show due to her erratic behavior, depression, and instability. Bates tried to salvage her career and traveled to England to find work. She was signed on as a contract player with the Rank Organisation, only to be replaced in two leading roles before filming began. Bates continued to be too emotionally unstable to work, and in 1957, her contract with the Rank Organisation was cancelled.

Upon returning to the United States in 1957, Bates and her husband got an apartment in Beverly Hills. Later that year, Bates made her last film, Apache Territory, which was released in September 1958. She then appeared in two television commercials, one for floor wax and another endorsing a now unknown product with Buster Keaton. In 1960, Bates's husband Cecil Coan was diagnosed with cancer. Bates put her career on hold to care for her ailing husband. The strain eventually became too much for her. She attempted suicide by slashing her wrists and was rushed to Cedars-Sinai Hospital, where she soon recovered. She made her final onscreen appearance in an episode of The Saint that aired in November 1962.

== Later years and death ==
In January 1967, Bates's husband died of cancer. Devastated by his death, Bates grew more depressed, and she again became suicidal. Later that year, she returned to Denver and fell out of public view. For a time, Bates worked as a secretary, dental assistant, and hospital aide. In December 1968, she married for the second time, to a childhood friend, sportscaster William Reed. Despite her new marriage and location, Bates remained increasingly despondent and depressed.

On March 18, 1969, just months after her marriage to Reed, Barbara Bates died by suicide in her mother's garage by carbon monoxide poisoning. She was 43 years old. She is buried at Crown Hill Cemetery in Jefferson County, Colorado.

== Filmography ==
Film
Year	Title	Role	Notes
1945	Strange Holiday	Peggy Lee Stevenson	Alternative titles: Terror on Main Street; The Day After Tomorrow
1945	Salome Where She Danced	Salome girl	Uncredited
1945	Lady on a Train	Hat Check Girl	Uncredited
1945	This Love of Ours	Mrs. Dailey	Uncredited
1945	The Crimson Canary	Girl	Uncredited
1946	Night in Paradise	Palace Maiden	Uncredited
1947	The Fabulous Joe	Debbie Terkel	
1947	The Hal Roach Comedy Carnival	Debbie Terkle, in Fabulous Joe	
1947	Always Together	Ticket Seller	Uncredited
1948	April Showers	Secretary	Uncredited
1948	Romance on the High Seas	Stewardess	Uncredited
1948	Johnny Belinda	Gracie Anderson	Uncredited
1948	June Bride	Jeanne Brinker	
1948	Adventures of Don Juan		Uncredited
1949	One Last Fling	June Payton	
1949	The House Across the Street	Beth Roberts	
1949	The Inspector General	Leza	
1950	Quicksand	Helen Calder	
1950	Cheaper by the Dozen	Ernestine Gilbreth	
1950	All About Eve	Phoebe	
1951	I'd Climb the Highest Mountain	Jenny Brock	
1951	The Secret of Convict Lake	Barbara Purcell	
1951	Let's Make It Legal	Barbara Denham	
1952	Belles on Their Toes	Ernestine Gilbreth	
1952	The Outcasts of Poker Flat	Piney Wilson	
1953	All Ashore	Jane Stanton	
1953	The Caddy	Lisa Anthony	
1954	Rhapsody	Effie Cahill	
1956	House of Secrets	Judy Anderson	
1957	Town on Trial	Elizabeth Fenner	
1958	Apache Territory	Jennifer Fair	

Television
Year	Title	Role	Notes
1953	The Revlon Mirror Theater		Episode: "Summer Dance"
1954–1955	It's a Great Life	Cathy "Katy" Morgan	26 episodes
1955	The Millionaire	Marian Curtis	Episode: "The Uncle Robby Story"
1955	Studio 57	Elaine Hilton	Episode: "Night Tune"
1962	The Saint	Helen Ravenna	Episode: "The Loaded Tourist"

== See also ==
- List of American film actresses
- List of people from Denver, Colorado
- Pin-ups of Yank, the Army Weekly
