= Chinatown Squad =

1935 film

- Directed by: Murray Roth
- Screenplay by: Dore Schary
- Story by: Lawrence G. Blochman
- Starring: Lyle Talbot; Valerie Hobson; Hugh O'Connell; Andy Devine
- Cinematography: George Robinson
- Edited by: Maurice E. Wright
- Production company: Universal Pictures Corp.
- Distributed by: Universal Pictures Corp.
- Release date: 20 May 1935
- Running time: 66 minutes
- Country: United States

Chinatown Squad is a 1935 American mystery film directed by Murray Roth, written by Dore Schary and Ben Ryan starring Lyle Talbot, Valerie Hobson, Hugh O'Connell, and Andy Devine, and featuring Leslie Fenton and Bradley Page. The film was released on May 31, 1935, by Universal Pictures.

== Cast ==
- Lyle Talbot as Ted Lacey
- Valerie Hobson as Janet Baker
- Hugh O'Connell as Sergeant McLeash
- Andy Devine as George Mason
- Leslie Fenton as Su Quong
- Bradley Page as Claude Palmer
- E. Alyn Warren as John Yee
- Clay Clement as Earl Raybold
- Arthur Hoyt as William Ward
- Wallis Clark as Police Lieutenant Norris

== Production ==
Chinatown Squad was developed under the working titles of Frisco Lady and Frisco Nights. It was shot on location in San Francisco between March 18 and April 6, 1935.

== Release ==
Chinatown Squad was distributed by Universal Pictures on May 20, 1935.

== Reception ==
From contemporary reviews, Variety declared the film as "Usual whodunit pattern" and that the "cast works nicely for common good without gaining much personal distinction. Direction neat." Motion Picture Herald stated that the film was "a lively combination of mystery, aptly set in atmosphere of San Francisco's Chinatown, and melodrama [...] this picture has those elements which are salabale in that they appeal two basic and perennial interests of the motion picture going public, action and mystery." Film Daily found the film to be a "fair murder mystery" noting "nothing very pretentious, but a generally entertaining Chinatown melodrama that ought to satisfy the not too meticulous murder mystery fans." A review in Harrison's Reports concluded that the film's plot was "somewhat complicated and far-fetched. But because of the fact the identity of the murderer is not made known until the end one's attention is held fairly well."

From retrospective reviews, Michael R. Pitts in his book Thrills Untapped described the feature as a "speedy affair" that was "hampered by mediocre direction but enhanced by a good cast."
