= Swing It, Sailor! =

1938 film by Raymond Joseph Cannon

- Swing it, Sailor.(1938).Isabel Jewell, Wallace Ford, and friend.
- Directed by: Raymond Cannon
- Written by: Clarence Marks (original story) and David Diamond (original story); Clarence Marks (screenplay) and David Diamond (screenplay)
- Produced by: David Diamond (producer); Gaston Glass (associate producer) (uncredited)
- Starring: See below
- Cinematography: Richard Fryer
- Edited by: Aaron Nibley; Gene Milford
- Distributed by: Grand National
- Release date: February 4, 1938
- Running time: 57 minutes
- Country: United States
- Language: English

Swing It, Sailor! is a 1938 American film directed by actor/screenwriter Raymond Cannon.

== Plot summary ==
Sailor Husky proposes marriage to every girl in every port. He can't swim, and is ready to be discharged from the Navy, but he's always helping his pal, Pete. Pete would hate to see Husky leave, as Pete has to do all the work himself. Husky's new girl is Myrtle, who goes through men like Kleenex, trolling for a well-heeled catch. Pete tries to save his friend from her; but, is it only for himself? It looks like they are in for a fight.

== Cast ==
- Wallace Ford as Pete Kelly
- Ray Mayer as Husky Stone
- Isabel Jewell as Myrtle Montrose
- Mary Treen as Gertie Burns
- Max Hoffman Jr. as Bos'n Hardy
- Cully Richards as Shamus O'Shay
- George Humbert as Pet Shop Proprietor
- Tom Kennedy as Policeman
- Alexander Leftwich as Captain
- Kenneth Harlan as First Officer
- Archie Robbins as Second Officer
- Kernan Cripps as Doctor
- Rex Lease as Intern
