= The Footloose Heiress =

1937 film by William Clemens

- Theatrical release poster
- Directed by: William Clemens
- Screenplay by: Robertson White
- Produced by: Bryan Foy
- Starring: Craig Reynolds; Ann Sheridan; Anne Nagel; William Hopper; Hugh O'Connell; Teddy Hart
- Cinematography: Arthur Edeson
- Edited by: Louis Hesse
- Music by: Howard Jackson
- Production company: Warner Bros. Pictures
- Distributed by: Warner Bros. Pictures
- Release date: August 21, 1937
- Running time: 59 minutes
- Country: United States
- Language: English

The Footloose Heiress is a 1937 American comedy film directed by William Clemens and written by Robertson White. The film stars Craig Reynolds, Ann Sheridan, Anne Nagel, William Hopper, Hugh O'Connell and Teddy Hart. The film was released by Warner Bros. Pictures on August 21, 1937.

== Plot ==
Kay Allyn (Ann Sheridan) is the spoiled daughter of eccentric advertising tycoon John C. Allyn (Hugh O'Connell). To win a $5,000 bet with a friend, Kay must wed society boy Jack Pierson (William Hopper) before midnight on her 18th birthday. As Jack has no means of supporting himself, her father is not impressed, and tries to foil his daughter's plans with the aid of hobo Bruce 'Butch' Baeder (Craig Reynolds). Taking a shine to the young man, the tycoon creates a job for him as a radio copy man, and Kay eventually falls for him. An added attraction is that hobo Bruce turns out to be the son of a famous Boston advertising millionaire.

== Cast ==
- Craig Reynolds as Bruce 'Butch' Baeder
- Ann Sheridan as Kay Allyn
- Anne Nagel as Linda Pierson
- William Hopper as Jack Pierson
- Hugh O'Connell as John C. Allyn
- Teddy Hart as Charlie McCarthy
- Hal Neiman as Luke Peaneather
- Frank Orth as Justice Abner Cuttler
- William Eberhardt as Wilbur Frost
- Loia Cheaney as Sarah Cuttler

== Critical reception ==
Allmovie wrote, "a few broad swipes at radio advertising aside, Footloose Heiress is as predictable as sunrise and sunset"; while Leonard Maltin wrote, "pretty funny screwball comedy bubbles along at a dizzy pace."
