= Gene Lockhart =

Canadian-American actor (1891–1957)

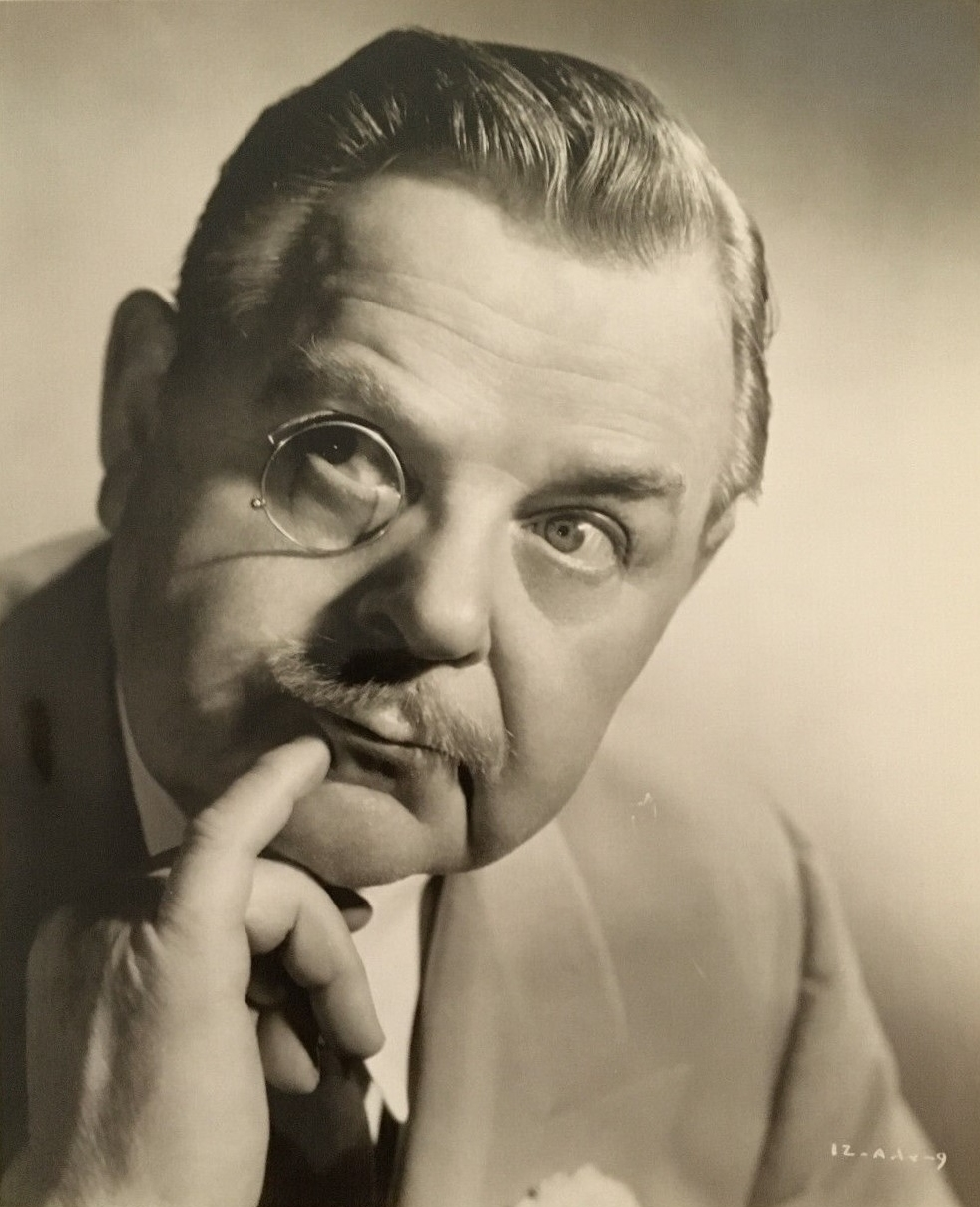
- Lockhart in a 1941 publicity image
- Born: Edwin Eugene Lockhart; July 18, 1891; London, Ontario, Canada
- Died: March 31, 1957 (aged 65); Santa Monica, California, U.S.
- Education: London Oratory School
- Occupations: Actor; singer; playwright
- Years active: 1912–1957
- Known for: A Christmas Carol; Miracle on 34th Street
- Spouse: Kathleen Arthur (m. 1924)
- Children: June Lockhart
- Relatives: Anne Lockhart (granddaughter)

Edwin Eugene Lockhart (July 18, 1891 – March 31, 1957) was a Canadian-American character actor, playwright, singer, and lyricist. He appeared in over 300 films, and received an Academy Award nomination for Best Supporting Actor for his role as Regis in Algiers (1938), the American remake of Pépé le Moko.

== Early life ==
Lockhart was born in London, Ontario, Canada, and made his professional debut at the age of six when he appeared with the Kilties Band of Canada. He later appeared in sketches with Beatrice Lillie.

Lockhart was raised Catholic and educated in Canadian schools and at the London Oratory School in London, England. He played football for the Toronto Argonauts.

== Stage ==
Lockhart had a long stage career; he also wrote professionally and taught acting and stage technique at the Juilliard School of Music in New York City. He also wrote theatrical sketches, radio shows, special stage material, song lyrics and articles for stage and radio magazines.

He made his Broadway debut in 1916, in the musical The Riviera Girl.

He was a member of the traveling play The Pierrot Players (for which he wrote the book and lyrics). This play introduced the song, The World Is Waiting for the Sunrise, for which Lockhart wrote the lyrics along with Canadian composer Ernest Seitz. (The song was subsequently made popular by Les Paul and Mary Ford in the 1950s.) He wrote and directed the Broadway musical revue Bunk of 1926. He sang in Die Fledermaus for the San Francisco Opera Association. On Broadway, Lockhart originated the roles of Uncle Sid in Eugene O'Neill's only comedy, Ah, Wilderness! (1933), and Fortesque in Arthur Schwartz's Virginia (1937).

In 1949, he took over from Lee J. Cobb as Willy Loman, during the original run of Arthur Miller's Death of a Salesman.

== Film ==
Lockhart made his film debut in Smilin' Through (1922) as the Rector, but he made few additional appearances during the silent era. His full-talkie debut was in the film By Your Leave (1934), where he played the playboy "Skeets". Lockhart subsequently appeared in more than 300 motion pictures. He often played villains, including a role as the treacherous informant Regis in Algiers (1938), the American remake of Pépé le Moko, which gained him an Academy Award nomination for Best Supporting Actor. He played the suspicious Georges de la Trémouille, the Dauphin's chief counselor, in Joan of Arc (1948), starring Ingrid Bergman.

He also had a great succession of "good guy" supporting roles including Bob Cratchit in A Christmas Carol (1938) and Judge Harper in Miracle on 34th Street (1947).

Upon the arrival of Orson Welles in Hollywood in 1940, Lockhart wrote a short poem satirizing Welles entitled "Little Orson Annie". The poem was a parody of the 1885 poem "Little Orphant Annie" by James Whitcomb Riley.

Lockhart played a bumbling sheriff in His Girl Friday (1940), opposite Cary Grant and Rosalind Russell. He appeared in the movie The Sea Wolf (1941), adapted from the novel by Jack London, as a ship's doctor. He played the Starkeeper in Carousel (1956). His last film role was that of the Equity Board President in the film Jeanne Eagels (1957).

== Personal life ==
Lockhart was married to actress Kathleen Lockhart from June 12, 1924, until his death. They had one child together, actress June Lockhart, through whom he is the grandfather of actress Anne Lockhart.

Lockhart became an American citizen in 1939.

== Death ==
Lockhart died March 31, 1957, from a coronary thrombosis at the age of 65 in St. John's Hospital, Santa Monica, California.

== Legacy ==
Lockhart has two stars on the Hollywood Walk of Fame—one for motion pictures, at 6307 Hollywood Boulevard, and one for television at 6681 Hollywood Boulevard. Both were dedicated February 8, 1960.

== Filmography ==
- Smilin' Through (1922) as Village Rector (film debut)
- The No Man (1933, Short)
- Paul Revere, Jr. (1933, Short) as Miles Standish (uncredited)
- By Your Leave (1934) as Skeets
- The Gay Bride (1934) as Jim Smiley (uncredited)
- Captain Hurricane (1935) as Capt. Jeremiah Taylor
- I've Been Around (1935) as Sammy Ames
- Storm Over the Andes (1935) as Cracker
- Star of Midnight (1935) as Horatio Swayne
- Thunder in the Night (1935) as Police Lt. Gabor
- Crime and Punishment (1935) as Lushin
- The Garden Murder Case (1936) as Lowe Hammle
- Brides Are Like That (1936) as John Robinson
- The First Baby (1936) as Mr. Ellis
- Times Square Playboy (1936) as P.H. "Ben"/"Pig Head" Bancroft
- Earthworm Tractors (1936) as George Healey
- The Gorgeous Hussy (1936) as Maj. William O'Neal
- The Devil Is a Sissy (1936) as Mr. Murphy
- Wedding Present (1936) as Archduke Gustav Ernest
- Come Closer, Folks (1936) as Elmer Woods
- Career Woman (1936) as Uncle Billy Burly
- Mind Your Own Business (1936) as Bottles
- Mama Steps Out (1937) as Mr. Sims
- Too Many Wives (1937) as Winfield Jackson
- The Sheik Steps Out (1937) as Samuel P. Murdock
- Something to Sing About (1937) as Bennett O. "B.O." Regan
- Algiers (1938) as Regis
- Of Human Hearts (1938) as Quid
- Sinners in Paradise (1938) as Senator Corey
- Stock and Blondes (1938, Short)
- Men Are Such Fools (1938) as Bill Dalton
- Penrod's Double Trouble (1938) as Mr. Frank Schofield
- Meet the Girls (1938) as Homer Watson
- Listen, Darling (1938) as Mr. Drubbs
- Blondie (1938) as C.P. Hazlip
- A Christmas Carol (1938) as Bob Cratchit
- Sweethearts (1938) as Augustus
- I'm from Missouri (1939) as Porgie Rowe
- The Story of Alexander Graham Bell (1939) as Thomas Sanders
- Hotel Imperial (1939) as Elias
- Tell No Tales (1939) as Arno
- Bridal Suite (1939) as Cornelius McGill
- Our Leading Citizen (1939) as J.T. Tapley
- Blackmail (1939) as William Ramey
- Geronimo (1939) as Gillespie
- His Girl Friday (1940) as Sheriff Peter B. Hartwell
- Abe Lincoln in Illinois (1940) as Stephen Douglas
- Edison, the Man (1940) as Mr. Taggart
- We Who Are Young (1940) as C.B. Beamis
- South of Pago Pago (1940) as Lindsay
- Dr. Kildare Goes Home (1940) as George Winslow
- A Dispatch from Reuter's (1940) as Otto Bauer
- Keeping Company (1940) as Mr. Hellman
- Meet John Doe (1941) as Mayor Lovett
- The Sea Wolf (1941) as Dr. Prescott
- Billy the Kid (1941) as Dan Hickey
- One Foot in Heaven (1941) as Preston Thurston
- International Lady (1941) as Sidney Grenner
- The Devil and Daniel Webster (1941) as Squire Slossum
- They Died with Their Boots On (1941) as Samuel Bacon, Esq.
- Steel Against the Sky (1941) as John Powers
- Juke Girl (1942) as Henry Madden
- The Gay Sisters (1942) as Herschell Gibbon
- You Can't Escape Forever (1942) as Carl Robelink
- Forever and a Day (1943) as Cobblewick
- Hangmen Also Die (1943) as Emil Czaka
- Mission to Moscow (1943) as Premier Molotov
- Find the Blackmailer (1943) as John M. Rhodes
- Northern Pursuit (1943) as Ernst
- Madame Curie (1943) (uncredited)
- The Desert Song (1943) as Pere FanFan
- Action in Arabia (1944) as Josef Danesco
- Going My Way (1944) as Ted Haines Sr.
- Man from Frisco (1944) as Joel Kennedy
- That's the Spirit (1945) as Jasper Cawthorne
- The House on 92nd Street (1945) as Charles Ogden Roper
- Leave Her to Heaven (1945) as Dr. Saunders
- Meet Me on Broadway (1946) as John Whittaker
- A Scandal in Paris (1946) as Prefect of Police Richet
- The Strange Woman (1946) as Isaiah Poster
- The Shocking Miss Pilgrim (1947) as Saxon
- Honeymoon (1947) as Consul Prescott
- Miracle on 34th Street (1947) as Judge Henry X. Harper
- Cynthia (1947) as Dr. Fred I. Jannings
- The Foxes of Harrow (1947) as Viscount Henri D'Arceneaux
- Her Husband's Affairs (1947) as Peter Winterbottom
- The Inside Story (1948) as Horace Taylor
- I, Jane Doe (1948) as Arnold Matson
- Apartment for Peggy (1948) as Prof. Edward Bell
- Joan of Arc (1948) as Georges de la Trémoille
- That Wonderful Urge (1948) as Judge Parker
- Down to the Sea in Ships (1949) as Andrew L. Bush
- The Sickle or the Cross (1949) as James John
- Madame Bovary (1949) as J. Homais
- Red Light (1949) as Warni Hazard
- The Inspector General (1949) as The Mayor
- Riding High (1950) as J.P. Chase
- The Big Hangover (1950) as Charles Parkford
- I'd Climb the Highest Mountain (1951) as Jeff Brock
- Rhubarb (1951) as Thaddeus J. Banner
- Texas Lady (1951) as Judge George Jeffers
- A Girl in Every Port (1952) as Garvey
- Hoodlum Empire (1952) as Senator Tower
- Down Among the Sheltering Palms (1953) as Rev. Paul Edgett
- Bonzo Goes to College (1952) as Clarence B. Gateson
- Apache War Smoke (1952) as Cyril R. Snowden
- Face to Face (1952) as Capt. Archbold ('The Secret Sharer')
- Tales of Tomorrow (1952, TV) as Prof. Vanya
- Androcles and the Lion (1952) as Menagerie Keeper
- Confidentially Connie (1953) as Dean Edward E. Magruder
- The Lady Wants Mink (1953) as Mr. Heggie
- Francis Covers the Big Town (1953) as Tom Henderson
- World for Ransom (1954) as Alexis Pederas
- The Father Who Had No Sons (1955, TV Movie) as Milton Hershey
- The Vanishing American (1955) as Blucher
- Carousel (1956) as Starkeeper/Dr. Selden
- The Man in the Gray Flannel Suit (1956) as Bill Hawthorne
- Science Fiction Theatre (1956, TV) as Dr. Richard Hewitt/Dr. Elwood Dove
- Telephone Time (1956, TV) as Louis P. Cashman
- Jeanne Eagels (1957) as Equity Board President (final film, released posthumously)

== See also ==
- List of actors with Academy Award nominations

== Sources ==
- "Gene Lockhart of Stage, Screen Actor of Supporting Roles Dies — Had First Broadway Part in 1916", New York Times, April 1, 1957.
