= Puddin' Head (film) =

1941 film by Joseph Santley

- Theatrical release poster
- Directed by: Joseph Santley
- Screenplay by: Jack Townley; Milt Gross
- Story by: Jack Townley
- Produced by: Albert J. Cohen
- Starring: Judy Canova; Francis Lederer; Raymond Walburn; Slim Summerville; Astrid Allwyn; Eddie Foy Jr. Alma Kruger; Hugh O'Connell; Chick Chandler
- Cinematography: Jack A. Marta
- Edited by: Ernest J. Nims
- Music by: Mort Glickman; Walter Scharf
- Production company: Republic Pictures
- Distributed by: Republic Pictures
- Release date: June 25, 1941
- Running time: 80 minutes
- Country: United States
- Language: English

Puddin' Head is a 1941 American comedy film directed by Joseph Santley and written by Jack Townley and Milt Gross. The film stars Judy Canova, Francis Lederer, Raymond Walburn, Slim Summerville, Astrid Allwyn, Eddie Foy Jr., Alma Kruger, Hugh O'Connell and Chick Chandler. It was released on June 25, 1941, by Republic Pictures.

== Plot ==
Harold l. Montgomery, the scatterbrain vice president of the United Broadcasting System, is dismayed when he learns that a minuscule portion of the ground on which the station's new building sits is part of the adjoining lot belonging to hillbilly girl Judy Goober, who could sue the company for millions. Afraid of his domineering, ill-tempered sister Matilda, who is the president of the company, Montgomery says nothing to her about the problem. He takes his equally scatterbrained son Junior to the Ozarks to convince Judy to sell the property before she learns the truth. However, when Judy does not agree to sell, Montgomery hires handsome Prince Karl, a Russian who faces jail for back alimony payments, to close the deal.

== Cast ==
- Judy Canova as Judy Goober
- Francis Lederer as Prince Karl
- Raymond Walburn as Harold Montgomery Sr.
- Slim Summerville as Uncle Lem
- Astrid Allwyn as Yvonne Jones
- Eddie Foy Jr. as Harold L. Montgomery Jr.
- Alma Kruger as Matilda Montgomery
- Hugh O'Connell as Kincaid
- Chick Chandler as Herman
- Paul Harvey as Mr. Harvey
- Nora Lane as Miss Jenkins
- Gerald Oliver Smith as Hudson
- Wendell Niles as Randall
- Vince Barnett as Otis Tarbell
- Betty Blythe as Mrs. Bowser
- M. J. Frankovich as Broadcaster
- Bill Days as Member of The Sportsmen Quartet
- John Rarig as Member of The Sportsmen Quartet
- Thurl Ravenscroft as Member of The Sportsmen Quartet
- Max Smith as Member of The Sportsmen Quartet
- Jack George as Tough
- Victor Potel as Hillbilly
