= Jack Killifer =

American film editor

- Born: November 19, 1898; Los Angeles, California, United States
- Died: August 6, 1956 (aged 57); Los Angeles, California, United States
- Occupation: Editor
- Years active: 1928–1955 (film)

Jack Killifer (1898–1956) was an American film editor. He was employed by Warner Brothers from 1928 to 1943.

== Selected filmography ==
- Lights of New York (1928)
- The Terror (1928)
- Conquest (1928)
- The Time, the Place and the Girl (1929)
- So Long Letty (1929)
- The Matrimonial Bed (1930)
- A Soldier's Plaything (1930)
- Smart Money (1931)
- The Match King (1932)
- Union Depot (1932)
- Female (1933)
- The Mayor of Hell (1933)
- Fashions of 1934 (1934)
- Babbitt (1934)
- Little Big Shot (1935)
- G Men (1935)
- Smarty (1935)
- Broadway Hostess (1935)
- The Right to Live (1935)
- Road Gang (1936)
- Times Square Playboy (1936)
- Bullets or Ballots (1936)
- That Certain Woman (1937)
- Marked Woman (1937)
- Swing Your Lady (1938)
- Men Are Such Fools (1938)
- They Made Me a Criminal (1939)
- The Roaring Twenties (1939)
- Torrid Zone (1940)
- High Sierra (1941)
- The Smiling Ghost (1941)
- Highway West (1941)
- The Man Who Came to Dinner (1942)
- Gentleman Jim (1943)
- Northern Pursuit (1943)
- Background to Danger (1943)
- The Hoodlum (1951)
- The Beast with a Million Eyes (1955)

== Bibliography ==
- Thomas McNulty. Errol Flynn: The Life and Career. McFarland, 2011.
