= I'd Climb the Highest Mountain =

1951 film

- Video cover
- Directed by: Henry King
- Written by: Lamar Trotti
- Based on: A Circuit Rider's Wife; 1910 novel by Corra Harris
- Produced by: Lamar Trotti
- Starring: Susan Hayward; William Lundigan; Rory Calhoun; Barbara Bates; Gene Lockhart; Alexander Knox; Lynn Bari
- Cinematography: Edward Cronjager
- Edited by: Barbara McLean
- Music by: Sol Kaplan
- Distributed by: Twentieth Century-Fox
- Release dates: February 6, 1951 (Atlanta); May 9, 1951 (New York)
- Running time: 88 minutes
- Country: United States
- Language: English
- Box office: $2,150,000 (US rentals)

I'd Climb the Highest Mountain is a 1951 Technicolor religious drama film directed by Henry King, produced by Lamar Trotti and starring Susan Hayward and William Lundigan. The screenplay was written by Trotti based the 1910 novel A Circuit-Rider's Wife by Corra Harris about a minister and his wife in southern Appalachia.

== Plot ==
William Thompson is a minister from the Deep South who has recently married Mary Elizabeth, a city woman. William is assigned a new parish and moves with his wife to a town in Georgia's Blue Ridge Mountains, where he tends to the spiritual and emotional needs of his small church. The poverty and isolation of the region, and the everyday problems of local people, put a strain on the couple's faith and marriage.

The townspeople have doubts about the new minister, and he must help his city-bred wife adjust to life in the country. As he leads his congregation through hardships, including an epidemic causing some deaths, he proves his worth as a pastor.

== Cast ==
- Susan Hayward as Mary Elizabeth Eden Thompson
- William Lundigan as Rev. William Asbury Thompson
- Rory Calhoun as Jack Stark
- Barbara Bates as Jenny Brock
- Gene Lockhart as Jeff Brock
- Lynn Bari as Mrs. Billywith
- Ruth Donnelly as Glory White
- Kathleen Lockhart as Mrs. Brock
- Alexander Knox as Tom Salter

== Production ==
The film was shot in Dawsonville, Georgia, in the Appalachian Mountains, an unusual and obscure location. Other scenes were filmed in the Georgia towns of Sautee-Nacoochee, Demorest and Cleveland.

On May 31, 1950, Hayward was nearly killed when she slipped at Amicalola Falls, which she had been photographing during a break from production. William Gray, a studio chauffeur, caught her and they escaped with only minor injuries.

== Release ==
The film's world premiere was held at the Paramount Theatre in Atlanta on February 6, 1951 with the film's star Susan Hayward and director Henry King in attendance. All proceeds were donated to Tallulah Falls School.

== Reception ==
In a contemporary review for The New York Times, critic Bosley Crowther wrote: "'I'd Climb the Highest Mountain' ... is not what you'd call a picture with a strong dramatic plot, rising to peaks of high excitement or theatrical suspense. It is rather a loosely rambling recount of touching and amusing episodes in the lives of a country parson and his inexperienced city-bred wife as they patiently devote themselves to the service of the people back in the hills. But it is done with such winning affection and it is so agreeably played by William Lundigan as the parson that it carries a warm and cheering glow."
