= Corra Mae Harris =

American journalist (1869 – 1935)

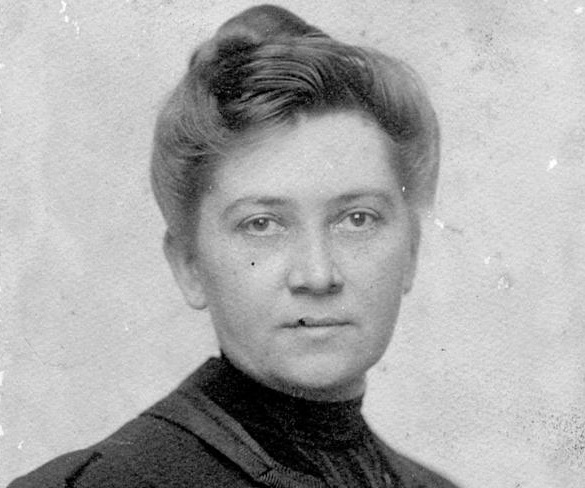
- Born: Corra Mae White; 17 March 1869; Elbert County, Georgia
- Died: 7 February 1935 (aged 65); Atlanta, Georgia
- Occupations: Novelist, journalist
- Spouse: Lundy Howard Harris

Corra Mae Harris (March 17, 1869 – February 7, 1935) was an American writer and journalist. She was one of the first women war correspondents to go abroad in World War I.

== Biography ==
Corra Mae White was born in Elbert County, Georgia, March 17, 1869, the daughter of the Confederate veteran Tinsley Rucker White (1843–1930) and Mary Elizabeth Matthews (1846–1890). Her grandfather was a State senator (1853–1854) named William Bowling White (1811–1858). He owned 46 enslaved women, children and men in the 1830 U.S. census and 33 in 1860. Her father, at age 17, owned five slaves, who were emancipated by the federal government three years later.

A stone monument marks her birthplace, the ancestral plantation of the White Family, who arrived November 11, 1792, and began growing tobacco in the region south of Ruckersville. The marker, on Highway 72 to the east of Elberton, reads: "Farm Hill: Girlhood Home of Corra Harris."

Her great-great-grandfather, Thomas White, and his second wife, came from a tobacco plantation along the Rapidan River at White's Ford north of Scuffletown, near the intersection today of Greene and Orange Counties in Piedmont Virginia. He was the son of John White (1696-1787), the emigrant of Leicestershire, England, who was granted 235 acres (95 ha) from George II, in 1738, in Orange County. He later purchased 356 acres (144 ha), part of the Octonio Grant, signed by the father of future president, James Madison, on the banks of the Rapidan River that included White's Ford.

Corra White had a formal education limited to teacher training at nearby female academies, though she never graduated from any of the schools she attended.

In 1887, she married Methodist minister and educator Lundy Howard Harris (1858–1910). They had one child survive to adulthood, a daughter named Faith (1887–1919). For roughly two decades Harris struggled through various personal tragedies, including a troubled marriage; the death of two infant sons; scandal and humiliation surrounding the abandonment, betrayal, and return of her husband in 1898 and his public confessions of adultery; the financial destitution resulting from the loss of his teaching position at Emory College; his suicide in 1910; her daughter's death in 1919; and her sister's death shortly after that. Harris remained a widow until her death 25 years later.

Harris was, for a time, the most widely known woman from the state of Georgia. Her literary reputation during her life and legacy since are connected with A Circuit Rider's Wife published in 1910. Reputedly autobiographical, the novel is at most a spiritual autobiography, with little else that resembles her actual life.

She wrote more than two dozen books, nineteen of which were published. Two were autobiographies, one a travel journal, and two became feature-length movies, the best known was I'd Climb the Highest Mountain, released in 1951 and inspired by, A Circuit Rider's Wife. The other was the 1920 film Husbands and Wives. She published over 200 articles and short stories, and well over a thousand book reviews.

She was one of the first women war correspondents to go abroad in World War I. She lived the last two decades of her life at the place she named In the Valley in Bartow County, Georgia, having purchased the land through Colonel Paul F. Akin. She wrote lovingly of "The Valley" where she lived as early as 1914.

A plaque erected in 1997 by Georgia Department of Natural Resources commemorates her life, located near Pine Log, on Mount Pleasant Road, at her "In the Valley" property, where she lived between 1913 until 1935.

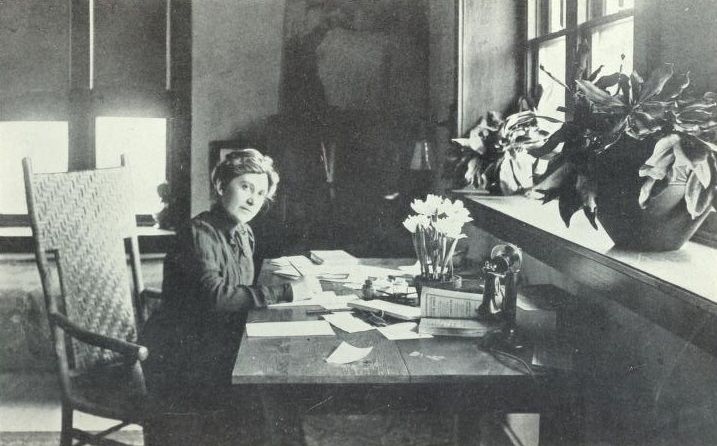
Mrs. Corra Harris, c. 1910s.

== Legacy ==
Although she became famous for her fiction, Harris's reputation for reactionary conservatism lasted throughout her life and became part of her contradictory legacy. Such a reputation resulted in part from her first nationally published piece in 1899. After the lynching of Thomas Wilkes, alias Sam Hose, near Newnan, Georgia, William Hayes Ward, editor-in-chief at the Independent, published an editorial denouncing the act. Harris wrote, and the Independent published, "A Southern Woman's View", a reply upholding the peculiar and brutal Southern practice, with the reasoning that lynching was a deterrent, and protected innocent white women from malevolent black men. The anti-lynching activist Ida B. Wells-Barnett (Ida B. Wells) called the reasoning "threadbare."

Editors at the Independent asked Harris for more, which launched her writing career. One editor called her writing "a degree of masculinity combined with homespun and relatable ease." Afterward, she wrote several non-fiction essays on southern identity that furthered conventional images of Southerners during the first decade of the century. They also tied her reputation then and after to regional apologia (apologists), an image that belies the complexity of her body of work.

After A Circuit Rider's Wife was published in 1910, Harris wrote and published prolifically, both fiction and non-fiction, throughout the nineteen-teens. During the 1920s, her most successful works were two autobiographies published in the middle of the decade. By the early 1930s Harris's publishing was limited largely to local areas. The last four years of her life, from 1931 to 1935, she published what critics have called some of her best writing in a tri-weekly "Candlelit Column" in the Atlanta Journal. Some critics have dismissed Harris's fiction as domestic or sentimental, but others find nuanced social and cultural critique in her works, especially of the South's gender and racial mores.

Harris died in Atlanta on February 7, 1935.

== Works ==
- (1904). The Jessica Letters, in collaboration with Paul Elmer More.
- (1910). A Circuit Rider's Wife.
- (1910). Eve's Second Husband.
- (1912). The Recording Angel.
- (1913). In Search of a Husband.
- (1915). The Co-Citizens.
- (1915). Justice.
- (1916). A Circuit Rider's Widow.
- (1918). Making Her His Wife.
- (1919). From Sunup to Sundown.
- (1919). In Search of a Husband.
- (1920). Happily Married.
- (1921). My Son.
- (1922). The Eyes of Love.
- (1923). A Daughter of Adam.
- (1923). The House of Helen.
- (1924). My Book and My Heart.
- (1925). As a Woman Thinks.
- (1926). Flapper Anne.
- (1927). The Happy Pilgrimage.

=== Selected articles ===
- (1914). "New York as Seen from a Georgia Valley: In the Valley," The Independent 77, pp. 97–99.
- (1914). "The Abomination of Cities," The Independent 77, pp. 129–131.
- (1914). "Men and Women: And the 'Woman Question'," The Independent 77, pp. 164–165.
- (1914). "Marriage: New Profession or Old Miracle?," The Independent 77, pp. 234–235.
- (1914). "The Streets of the City," The Independent 77, pp. 306–308.
- (1914). "How New York Amuses Itself," The Independent 77, pp. 374–376.
- (1914). "The Literary Spectrum of New York," The Independent 77, pp. 441–443.
- (1914). "If You Must Come to New York," The Independent 78, pp. 29–32.
- (1914). "The Valley: After New York," The Independent 79, pp. 63–65.
- (1915). "From the Peace Zone in the Valley," The Independent 81, pp. 190–192.
- (1915). "War and Bride in June," The Independent 81, p. 506.
- (1916). "Why We Should Read Books," The Independent 85, pp. 117–118.
- (1916). "What Men Know About Women," The Independent 85, p. 379.
- (1916). "June Brides," The Independent 85, p. 377.
- (1916). "The Woman of Yesterday," The Independent 85, pp. 484.
- (1916). "In the Valley," The Independent 87, pp. 123–124.
- (1916). "Politics and Prayers in the Valley," The Independent 87, pp. 135–136.
- (1917). "War Time in the Valley," The Independent 91, p. 471.
- (1919). "Was Eve a Feminist?," The Independent 97, p. 338.

=== Short stories ===
- (1912). "Jeff," The Independent 73, pp. 714–724.
- (1913). "On the Instalment Plan," Harper's Monthly Magazine, Vol. CXXVII, pp. 342–353.
- (1915). "The Other People," Harper's Monthly Magazine, Vol. CXXVII, pp. 54–57.

== See also ==
- Corra White Harris House, Study, and Chapel, her home "In the Valley", which is listed on the National Register of Historic Places
