= Ladies Must Live (1940 film) =

- Directed by: Noel M. Smith
- Written by: George M. Cohan (play); Robert E. Kent
- Based on: The Hometowners; 1926 play by George M. Cohan
- Produced by: William Jacobs; Bryan Foy
- Starring: Wayne Morris; Rosemary Lane; Lee Patrick
- Cinematography: Ted D. McCord
- Edited by: Everett Dodd
- Music by: Howard Jackson
- Production company: First National Pictures
- Distributed by: Warner Bros. Pictures, Inc.
- Release date: July 27, 1940
- Running time: 58 minutes
- Country: United States
- Language: English

Ladies Must Live is a 1940 American romantic comedy film directed by Noel M. Smith and starring Wayne Morris, Rosemary Lane and Lee Patrick.

It is a B movie produced by the major Hollywood studio Warner Bros. Pictures. The film's sets were designed by the art director Esdras Hartley.

== Cast ==
- Wayne Morris as Corey Lake
- Rosemary Lane as Pat Halliday
- Lee Patrick as Mary Larrabee
- Roscoe Karns as Pete H. "Pighead" Larrabee
- George Reeves as George Halliday
- Ferris Taylor as Paul Halliday
- Lottie Williams as Mrs. Laura Halliday
- William Hopper as Joe Barton
- Cliff Saum as Chief Thunderbird, Corey's Indian Valet
- Billy Dawson as Tommy "Tom"
- Mildred Gover as Lettie, Pat's maid
- Margaret Hayes as Chorus girl
- Mildred Coles as Chorus girl
- Phyllis Hamilton as Hat check girl
- Wendell Niles as Radio commentator (voice)
- Leo White as Pierre, Headwaiter of Club Two-Time
