= She Gets Her Man (1935 film) =

1935 American comedy film by William Nigh

- Directed by: William Nigh
- Screenplay by: Aben Kandel
- Story by: David Diamond; Aben Kandel
- Produced by: David Diamond
- Starring: ZaSu Pitts; Hugh O'Connell; Helen Twelvetrees; Lucien Littlefield; Edward Brophy; Warren Hymer
- Cinematography: Norbert Brodine
- Edited by: Bernard W. Burton
- Music by: Karl Hajos; Arthur Morton
- Production company: Universal Pictures
- Distributed by: Universal Pictures
- Release date: August 5, 1935
- Running time: 65 minutes
- Country: United States
- Language: English

She Gets Her Man is a 1935 American comedy film directed by William Nigh and written by Aben Kandel. The film stars ZaSu Pitts, Hugh O'Connell, Helen Twelvetrees, Lucien Littlefield, Edward Brophy, and Warren Hymer. It was released on August 5, 1935, by Universal Pictures.

== Plot ==
The cook in a small-town Arkansas diner (Pitts) manages to foil a gang planning a bank robbery, and as a result receives acclaim in the national press. Although this attention leads the gang to later kidnap her, she ingratiates herself with the gang to the extent that they not only release her, but they decide to give up their criminal activities.

== Cast ==
- ZaSu Pitts as Esmeralda
- Hugh O'Connell as Windy
- Helen Twelvetrees as Francine
- Lucien Littlefield as Elmer
- Edward Brophy as Flash
- Warren Hymer as Spike
- Bert Gordon as Goofy
- Ward Bond as Chick
