= Gig Young =

American actor (1913–1978)

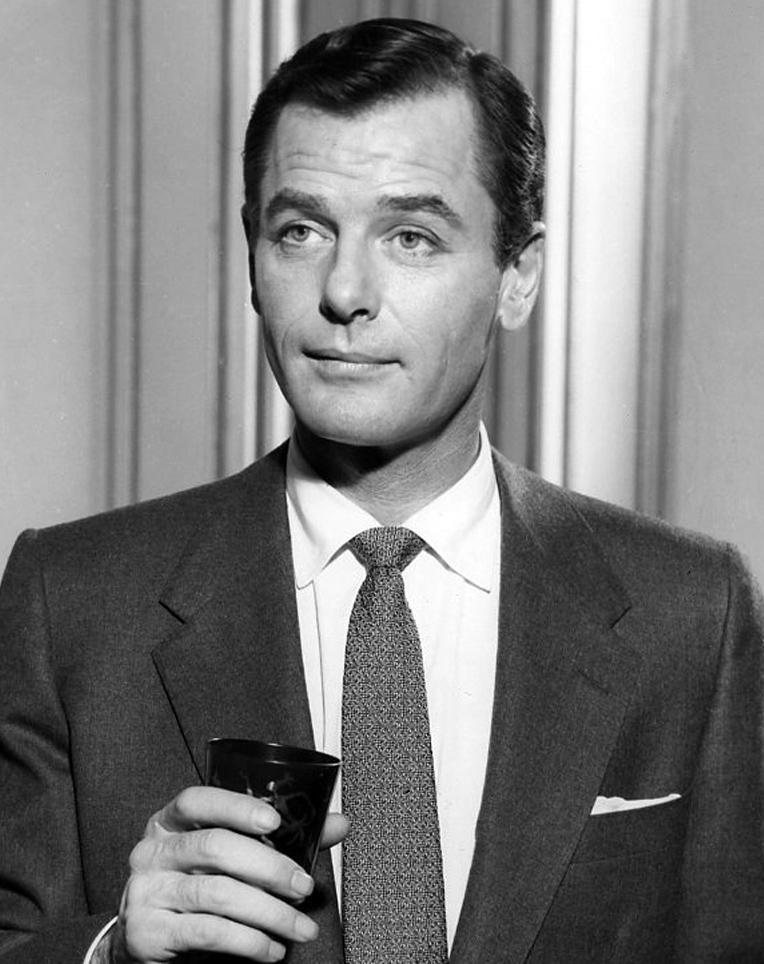
- Young in 1953
- Born: Byron Elsworth Barr; November 4, 1913; St. Cloud, Minnesota, U.S.
- Died: October 19, 1978 (aged 64); New York City, U.S.
- Cause of death: Ballistic trauma (murder–suicide)
- Occupation: Actor
- Years active: 1940–1978
- Spouses: Sheila Stapler (m. 1940; div. 1947) Sophie Rosenstein (m. 1950; died 1952) Elizabeth Montgomery (m. 1956; div. 1963) Elaine Williams (m. 1963; div. 1966) Kim Schmidt (m. 1978; died 1978)
- Children: 1

Gig Young (born Byron Elsworth Barr; November 4, 1913 – October 19, 1978) was an American actor. He was active in film, television, and theater from the late 1930s through the 1970s, and was initially known for his portrayals of characters with "light-hearted sophistication." He won the Academy Award for Best Supporting Actor for his performance in They Shoot Horses, Don't They? (1969), with two previous nominations for Come Fill the Cup (1952) and Teacher's Pet (1959).

Young's career was hampered by a troubled personal life. Dissatisfied with the quality of roles, his worsening alcoholism caused him to lose several high-profile parts, severely hurting his career prospects. In 1978, Young murdered his 31-year-old wife three weeks after their wedding before turning the gun on himself and committing suicide at the age of 64.

== Early life ==
Born Byron Elsworth Barr in St. Cloud, Minnesota, he and his older siblings were raised by his parents, John and Emma Barr, in Washington, D.C., where his father was a reformatory chef. He attended McKinley High School, where he developed his first love of acting appearing in school plays.

== Career ==
=== Theater ===
After graduating from high school he worked as a used car salesman and studied acting at night. He moved to Hollywood when a friend offered him a ride if he would pay for half the gas. After some amateur experience, he applied for and received a scholarship to the Pasadena Playhouse. "I had two jobs to support me, never rested, but it was great training and when I landed the part at Warner Bros., I was ready for it," he said.

Barr made early appearances in Misbehaving Husbands (1940), credited as "Byron Barr", and in the short Here Comes the Cavalry (1941). While acting in Pancho, a south-of-the-border play by Lowell Barrington, he and the leading actor in the play, George Reeves, were spotted by a Warner Brothers talent scout. Both actors were signed to supporting player contracts with the studio.

=== Warner Bros. as Byron Barr ===
His early work was uncredited or as Byron Barr (not to be confused with another actor with the same name, Byron Barr) or Byron Fleming. It included appearances in Sergeant York (1941), Dive Bomber (1941), Navy Blues (1941), and One Foot in Heaven (1941). Barr had a bigger part in the short The Tanks Are Coming (1941), which was nominated for an Oscar.

He was also in They Died with Their Boots On (1941) and You're in the Army Now (1941). He had an uncredited bit part in the 1942 Bette Davis film The Man Who Came to Dinner, saying, in his distinctive voice, "How's the ice?." He was also in Captains of the Clouds (1942), and The Male Animal (1942). Warners loaned him to Fox for The Mad Martindales (1942).

=== The Gay Sisters and becoming Gig Young ===
In 1942, six months into his Warner Brothers contract, he was given his first notable role in the feature film The Gay Sisters as a character named Gig Young. Preview cards praised the actor Gig Young, and the studio determined that Gig Young should become Barr's stage and professional name. About the name change, Young later admitted to having "some hesitancy...but I weighed the disadvantages against the advantages of having it stick indelibly in the mind of audiences. There'd be no confusion with some other actor called Gig." His parts began to get better: a co-pilot in Howard Hawks' Air Force (1943); and Bette Davis' love interest in Old Acquaintance (1943).

Young took a hiatus from his movie career and enlisted in the U.S. Coast Guard in 1941, where he saw combat service as a pharmacist's mate in the Pacific Theatre through the end of World War II. On Young's return stateside, he was cast as Errol Flynn's rival for Eleanor Parker in Escape Me Never (1947). The film was directed by Peter Godfrey, who also helmed Young and Parker in The Woman in White (1948), after which Young left Warners, unhappy with his salary.

=== Post-Warner Bros. ===
Young began freelancing at various studios, eventually obtaining a contract with Columbia Pictures before returning to freelancing. He came to be regarded as a popular and likable second lead, playing the brothers or friends of the principal characters. In a 1966 interview he said "Whenever you play a second lead and lose the girl, you have to make your part interesting yet not compete with the leading man. There are few great second leads in this business. It's easier to play a lead – you can do whatever you want. If I'm good, it always means the leading man has been generous."

Young was Porthos in Metro-Goldwyn-Mayer's The Three Musketeers (1948). He supported John Wayne in Wake of the Red Witch (1948) at Republic Pictures and Glenn Ford in Columbia's Lust for Gold (1949). Also at Columbia, he supported Rosalind Russell and Robert Cummings in Tell It to the Judge (1949). Young had his first lead in a feature film at RKO in Hunt the Man Down (1951), a film noir. He returned to supporting roles for Target Unknown (1951) a war film at Universal; and Only the Valiant (1951), a western.

Young began to appear in TV on shows such as The Silver Theatre, Pulitzer Prize Playhouse, and The Bigelow Theatre.

=== Come Fill the Cup and first Oscar nomination ===
Young received critical acclaim for his dramatic work as an alcoholic in the 1951 film Come Fill the Cup, with James Cagney back at Warner Brothers. He was nominated for both an Oscar and Golden Globe for Best Supporting Actor. Young later gave Cagney a great deal of the credit for his performance.

=== Metro-Goldwyn-Mayer ===
Young supported Van Johnson in the MGM comedy Too Young to Kiss (1952). The studio liked Young so much that he was signed to a term contract. After supporting Peter Lawford in You for Me (1952), Young was promoted by MGM to leading man for Holiday for Sinners (1952). The film was a box office failure, however. More popular was The Girl Who Had Everything (1953).

MGM loaned Young to Republic Pictures for City That Never Sleeps (1953), where he had the starring role as a disillusioned cop. In 2008 Martin Scorsese selected this film to open a Republic Pictures retrospective that he curated at New York's Museum of Modern Art, citing the movie's amazing energy and creativity. Back at MGM, Young was the lead in the 3-D western Arena (1953), which was a hit. He was a second male lead again – to Michael Wilding – in the Joan Crawford vehicle Torch Song (1953). Promptly after completing both films, the trade magazine Hollywood Reporter told its readers that MGM had just assigned Gig Young to the fourth leading role in the film Gypsy Colt. Likely noticing that his roles were now moving in the wrong direction, he left MGM. "I played terrible parts there", he later said. He then moved to New York.

=== Broadway ===
Young said he rarely performed in comedies until he appeared on Broadway in Oh Men! Oh Women! (1953–1954), which ran for 382 performances. Young said "It was a big smash hit but never helped change my type in Hollywood for quite some time. I still played dull, serious parts like Errol Flynn's brother. Yet on Broadway, they offered me nothing but comedies."

During this time, Young appeared on TV shows shot in New York, such as Robert Montgomery Presents, Schlitz Playhouse, Producers' Showcase, and Lux Video Theatre.

=== Return to Warner Bros. ===
When Oh Men! Oh, Women ended its run, Young retunred to Warner Bros in Young at Heart (1955). In 1955, Young became the host of Warner Bros. Presents, an umbrella title for three television mini-series (Casablanca, Kings Row, and Cheyenne) that aired during the 1955-1956 season on ABC Television. He played a supporting role the same year in the Humphrey Bogart thriller The Desperate Hours and in Desk Set (1957). He continued to appear on TV in such shows as The United States Steel Hour, Climax!, Goodyear Theatre, and Studio One in Hollywood (the latter starring Elizabeth Montgomery, whom he married in 1956).

Young is remembered by many James Dean fans for the "driving safety" interview made shortly before Dean's fatal car accident in September 1955. Dean wears a cowboy outfit as he was taking a break from shooting the 1956 film Giant while playing with a lasso and counseling the audience to drive carefully.

=== Teacher's Pet and second Oscar nomination ===
George Seaton saw Young on Broadway and cast him as a charming intellectual in Teacher's Pet (1958), starring Clark Gable and Doris Day. It earned Young a second Best Supporting Actor Oscar nomination. Young was promptly reunited with Day in The Tunnel of Love (1958). Also at MGM, he appeared with Shirley MacLaine and David Niven in Ask Any Girl (1959). Young had a change of pace in The Story on Page One (1959).

On TV, he appeared in a 1959 Twilight Zone episode titled "Walking Distance". He had some parts – all male leads – in TV adaptations of The Philadelphia Story (1959), The Prince and the Pauper, Ninotchka (1960), and The Spiral Staircase (1961). He guest-starred on The Alfred Hitchcock Hour and Kraft Suspense Theatre.

Young returned to Broadway with Under the Yum-Yum Tree (1960-1961), which ran for 173 performances. Some announced film projects fell through, so he played second lead in That Touch of Mink (1962). He was in Kid Galahad (1962) and in Five Miles to Midnight (1962). After supporting Kirk Douglas in For Love or Money (1963), he was given a rare male lead in MGM's A Ticklish Affair (1963).

=== The Rogues ===
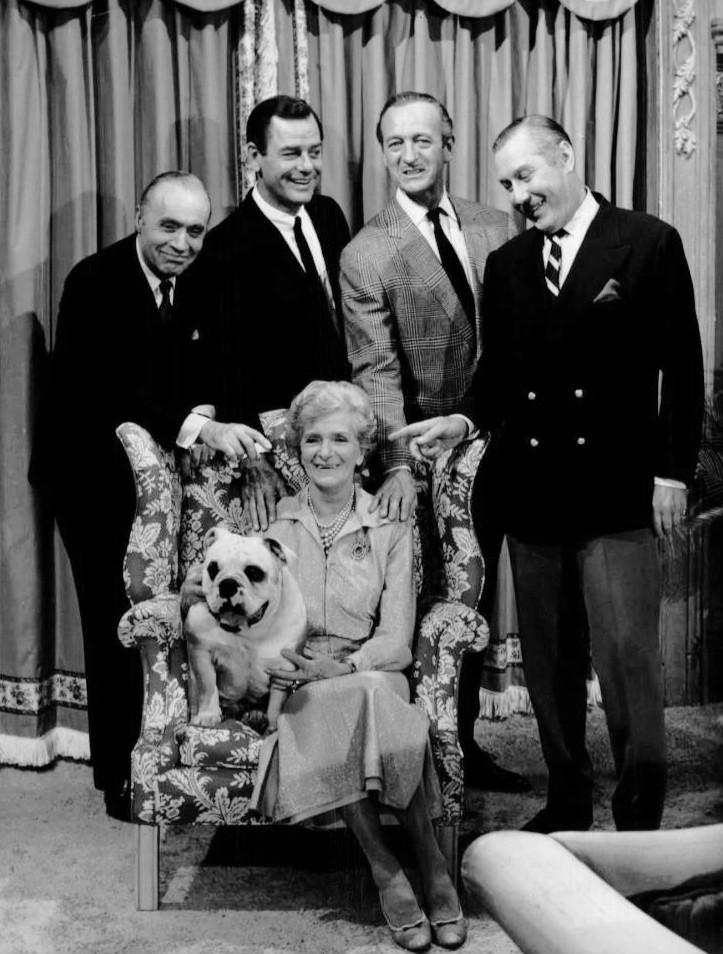
The cast of The Rogues (1964) with Charles Boyer, Gig Young, David Niven, Robert Coote and Gladys Cooper

On the 1964-1965 TV series The Rogues, he shared appearances on a rotating basis with David Niven and Charles Boyer, but Young played in the greater number of episodes. The charming con man he played on this show was one of Young's favorite roles, and it raised his profile with the television viewing public. He later said "I loved it, the public loved it, only NBC didn't love it." Despite its popularity and critical acclaim, The Rogues was cancelled after one 30-episode season.

During the filming of The Rogues, Young's alcoholism was starting to take a toll on his career; Larry Hagman had to be brought in as a substitute for the final two episodes. After the show ended, Young went on tour as Harold Hill in The Music Man, his first stage musical. He supported Rock Hudson in the comedy Strange Bedfellows (1965), had the lead in a British horror film The Shuttered Room (1967), and starred in a TV mystery movie Companions in Nightmare (1968). He enjoyed a successful return to Broadway in the hit comedy from Britain There's a Girl in My Soup (1967-1968), which ran for 322 performances.

=== They Shoot Horses, Don't They? ===
Young won the Academy Award for Best Supporting Actor for his role as Rocky, the alcoholic dance marathon emcee and promoter in the 1969 film They Shoot Horses, Don't They? Young had not been the choice of director Sydney Pollack, but his casting was mandated by the head of ABC Pictures, Marty Baum, Young's former agent. According to his fourth wife, Elaine Williams, "What he was aching for, as he walked up to collect his Oscar, was a role in his own movie—one that they could finally call 'a Gig Young movie.' For Gig, the Oscar was literally the kiss of death, the end of the line."

Young had said to Louella Parsons after failing to win in 1951 "so many people who have been nominated for an Oscar have had bad luck afterwards." However, when he finally won, Young called the Oscar "the greatest moment of his life."

Young had a good part in the popular Lovers and Other Strangers (1970), also from ABC Pictures, and toured in Nobody Loves an Albatross (1970) in summer stock. He was in the TV movie The Neon Ceiling (1971), his performance earning him an Emmy nomination. A profile of Young around this time stated "The well-established image of the boozy charmer Gig plays on and off camera fools you. That armour surrounds an intense dedicated artist, constantly involved with his profession."

=== Career decline ===
Young's worsening alcoholism began to cost him roles. Originally cast as The Waco Kid, Young collapsed on the set of the comedy film Blazing Saddles during his first day of shooting due to alcohol withdrawal and was fired by director Mel Brooks. Brooks replaced him with Gene Wilder. He was also replaced as the lead of the Disney comedy Superdad. Young had a supporting role in Bring Me the Head of Alfredo Garcia (1974), directed by Sam Peckinpah, and was in A Black Ribbon for Deborah (1974). He was in the TV movies The Great Ice Rip-Off (1974) and The Turning Point of Jim Malloy (1975); Peckinpah used him again in The Killer Elite (1975). In 1976, Aaron Spelling cast Young as the offscreen Charlie in his new action show Charlie's Angels. However, Young's alcoholism prevented him from performing the role, even only as a voice actor, and he was replaced by John Forsythe.

Young was one of several names to star in The Hindenburg (1975). He guest-starred on McCloud, had supporting roles in Sherlock Holmes in New York (1976) and Spectre (1977), and was a semi-regular on the TV series Gibbsville (1976-1977), a spinoff from the TV movie The Turning Point of Jim Malloy. His last role was in the 1978 revised version of Game of Death, released six years after the film's original star Bruce Lee died during production in 1973.

== Personal life ==
Young was married five times. His first marriage to Sheila Stapler, a Pasadena Playhouse classmate, lasted seven years, ending in 1947. "We were too young, it couldn't have lasted", he later said. In 1950, he married Sophie Rosenstein, the resident drama coach at Paramount who was several years Young's senior. She was soon diagnosed with cancer and died just short of two years after the couple's wedding. For a time, he was engaged to actress Elaine Stritch.

Young met actress Elizabeth Montgomery after she appeared in an episode of Warner Bros. Presents in 1956, and the two married later that year. In 1963, Montgomery divorced Young because of his worsening alcoholism. Young married his fourth wife, real estate agent Elaine Williams, nine months after his divorce from Montgomery was final. Williams was pregnant at the time and gave birth to their only child, Jennifer, in April 1964. After three years of marriage, the couple divorced. During a legal battle over child support with Williams, Young denied that Jennifer was his biological child. After five years of court battles, Young lost his case.

On September 27, 1978, Young, age 64, married his fifth wife, 31-year-old German magazine editor Kim Schmidt, whom he had met in Hong Kong while working on Game of Death.

== Death ==
On October 19, 1978, three weeks after his marriage to Schmidt, the couple was found dead in their apartment at The Osborne in Manhattan. Police surmised that Young shot his wife and then himself. Young was found face down on the floor of his bedroom with a .38 caliber Smith & Wesson pistol in his hand. His wife was found face down beside him. Young had apparently shot himself in the mouth, and the bullet exited the back of his head. His wife had been shot in the back of the head. No suicide note was found.

A motive for the murder of his wife, and Young's suicide, was never discovered. Police said there was a diary opened to September 27 with "we got married today" written on it. The couple appear to have died around 2:30 p.m., when shots were heard by a building employee, and their bodies were found five hours later. Young was at one time under the care of the psychologist and psychotherapist Eugene Landy, who later had his professional California medical license revoked amid accusations of ethical violations and misconduct with patients.

Young's funeral was held in Beverly Hills, California, and he was buried in Green Hill Cemetery in Waynesville, North Carolina, under his birth name, Byron E. Barr, in his family's plot along with his parents, siblings, and an uncle.

Young's will, which covered a $200,000 estate, left his Academy Award to his agent Martin Baum and Baum's wife Bernice. Young's daughter Jennifer launched a campaign in the early 1990s to get the award from his agent and struck an agreement that she would be given the Oscar upon the agent's death, which occurred in 2010.

== Legacy ==
For his contribution to the television industry, Young has a star on the Hollywood Walk of Fame at 6821 Hollywood Boulevard.

== Filmography ==
=== Film ===
Year	Title	Role	Notes
1940	Misbehaving Husbands	Floor Walker	Credited as 'Byron Barr'
1941	Here Comes the Cavalry	Trooper Rollins	Short, credited as 'Byron Barr'
1941	Sergeant York	Marching soldier	Uncredited
1941	Dive Bomber	Pilot Abbott	Uncredited
1941	Navy Blues	Sailor in storeroom	Uncredited
1941	One Foot in Heaven	First groom asking for dog license	Uncredited
1941	The Tanks Are Coming	Jim Allen	Short, credited as 'Byron Barr'
1941	They Died with Their Boots On	Lieutenant Roberts	Uncredited
1941	You're in the Army Now	Soldier	Uncredited
1942	The Man Who Came to Dinner	Bit part	Uncredited
1942	Captains of the Clouds	Student pilot	Credited as 'Byron Barr'
1942	The Male Animal	Student	Uncredited
1942	The Mad Martindales	Peter Varney	Credited as 'Byron Barr'
1942	The Gay Sisters	Gig Young	Initially credited as 'Byron Barr'
1943	Air Force	Co-Pilot	
1943	Old Acquaintance	Rudd Kendall	
1946	They Made Me a Killer	Steve Reynolds	Credited as 'Byron Barr'
1947	Escape Me Never	Caryl Dubrok	
1948	The Woman in White	Walter Hartright	
1948	The Three Musketeers	Porthos	
1948	Wake of the Red Witch	Samuel 'Sam' Rosen	
1949	Lust for Gold	Pete Thomas	
1949	Tell It to the Judge	Alexander Darvac	
1950	Tarnished	Joe Pettigrew	
1950	Hunt the Man Down	Paul Bennett	
1951	Target Unknown	Captain Reiner	
1951	Only the Valiant	Lieutenant William Holloway	
1951	Slaughter Trail	Ike Vaughn	
1951	Come Fill the Cup	Boyd Copeland	
1951	Too Young to Kiss	John Tirsen	
1952	You for Me	Dr. Jeff Chadwick	
1952	Holiday for Sinners	Dr. Jason Kent	
1953	The Girl Who Had Everything	Vance Court	
1953	City That Never Sleeps	Johnny Kelly	
1953	Arena	Hob Danvers	
1953	Torch Song	Cliff Willard	
1954	Rear Window	Jeff's Editor (voice)	Uncredited
1954	Young at Heart	Alex Burke	
1955	The Desperate Hours	Chuck Wright	
1957	Desk Set	Mike Cutler	
1958	Teacher's Pet	Dr. Hugo Pine	
1958	The Tunnel of Love	Dick Pepper	
1959	Ask Any Girl	Evan Doughton	
1959	The Story on Page One	Larry Ellis	
1962	That Touch of Mink	Roger	
1962	Kid Galahad	Willy Grogan	
1962	Five Miles to Midnight	David Barnes	
1963	For Love or Money	'Sonny' John Dayton Smith	
1963	A Ticklish Affair	Key Weedon	
1965	Strange Bedfellows	Richard Bramwell	
1967	The Shuttered Room	Mike Kelton	
1969	They Shoot Horses, Don't They?	Rocky	
1970	Lovers and Other Strangers	Hal Henderson	
1974	Bring Me the Head of Alfredo Garcia	Quill	
1974	Deborah	Ofenbauer	
1975	The Killer Elite	Lawrence Weyburn	
1975	The Hindenburg	Edward Douglas	
1978	Game of Death	Jim Marshall	

=== Television ===
Year	Title	Role	Notes
1950	The Silver Theater	Tim Davis	Season 1 Episode 32: "Lady with Ideas"
1951	Pulitzer Prize Playhouse	George Callahan	Season 1 Episode 15: "Ned McCobb's Daughter"
1951	The Bigelow Theatre		Season 1 Episode 6: "Rewrite for Love"
1953	Robert Montgomery Presents	Tony Marino	Season 5 Episode 8: "The Sunday Punch"
1953	Schlitz Playhouse of Stars	Jimmy Sampson	Season 3 Episode 16: "Part of the Game"
1954	Producers' Showcase	Simon Gayforth	Season 1 Episode 1: "Tonight at 8:30" (Segment: "Shadow Play")
1954	Lux Video Theatre		Season 5 Episode 13: "Captive City"
1955–56	Warner Brothers Presents	Himself (host)	36 episodes
1956	The United States Steel Hour	Dave Corman	Season 4 Episode 3: "Sauce for the Goose"
1957	Climax!	Edgar Holt	Season 4 Episode 1: "Jacob and the Angels"
1957	Studio One	Philip Adams / Alan Fredericks	Season 10 Episode 23: "A Dead Ringer"
1958	Goodyear Theatre	Herman Worth	Season 2 Episode 3: "The Spy"
1959	The Twilight Zone	Martin Sloan	Season 1 Episode 5: "Walking Distance"
1960	Shirley Temple's Storybook	Miles Hendon	Season 2 Episode 7: "The Prince and the Pauper"
1962	The Alfred Hitchcock Hour	John 'Jack' 'Duke' Marsden	Season 1 Episode 1: "A Piece of the Action"
1963	Kraft Suspense Theatre	Hugo Myrich	Season 1 Episode 3: "The End of the World, Baby"
1964–65	The Rogues	Tony Fleming	22 episodes
1965	The Andy Williams Show	Himself (guest)	1 episode
1976	McCloud	Jack Haferman	Season 6 Episode 6: "The Day New York Turned Blue"
1976–77	Gibbsville	Ray Whitehead	13 episodes

==== TV films, specials, and miniseries ====
Year	Title	Role
1959	The Philadelphia Story	C.K. Dexter Haven
1960	Ninotchka	Leon Dolga
1961	The Spiral Staircase	Stephen Warren
1968	Companions in Nightmare	Eric Nicholson
1971	The Neon Ceiling	Jones
1974	The Great Ice Rip-Off	Harkey Rollins
1975	Gibbsville	Ray Whitehead
1976	Sherlock Holmes in New York	Mortimer McGrew
1977	Spectre	Dr. Amos "Ham" Hamilton

== Stage credits ==
Year	Title	Role	Venue	Notes
1939	Pancho	Howard Curtis	Pasadena Playhouse, Pasadena	
1940	Pancho	Howard Curtis	University Club of Pasadena, Pasadena	
1960–61	Under the Yum Yum Tree	Hogan	Henry Miller's Theatre, New York	
1965	The Music Man	Professor Harold Hill	U.S. tour	
1967–68	There's a Girl in My Soup	Robert Danvers	Music Box Theatre, New York	
1968	On a Clear Day You Can See Forever	Dr. Mark Bruckner	Starlite Music Theatre, Colonie	
1968	On a Clear Day You Can See Forever	Dr. Mark Bruckner	Butler University, Indianapolis	
1973	Under the Yum-Yum Tree	Hogan	Westchester Country Playhouse, Yonkers	

== Awards and nominations ==
Award	Year	Category	Work	Results	Ref.
Academy Awards	1951	Best Supporting Actor	Come Fill the Cup	Nominated	
Academy Awards	1958	Best Supporting Actor	Teacher's Pet	Nominated	
Academy Awards	1969	Best Supporting Actor	They Shoot Horses, Don't They?	Won	
British Academy Film Awards	1970	Best Actor in a Supporting Role	They Shoot Horses, Don't They?	Nominated	
Golden Globe Awards	1958	Best Supporting Actor – Motion Picture	Teacher's Pet	Nominated	
Golden Globe Awards	1969	Best Supporting Actor – Motion Picture	They Shoot Horses, Don't They?	Won	
Kansas City Film Critics Circle Awards	1970	Best Supporting Actor	They Shoot Horses, Don't They?	Won	
Laurel Awards	1958	Top Male Comedy Performance	Teacher's Pet	4th place	
Laurel Awards	1959	Top Male Supporting Performance	The Tunnel of Love	Won	
Laurel Awards	1963	Top Male Supporting Performance	That Touch of Mink	Won	
Primetime Emmy Awards	1971	Outstanding Single Performance by an Actor in a Leading Role	The Neon Ceiling	Nominated	
