= A. I. Bezzerides =

American writer (1908-2007)

A. I. "Buzz" Bezzerides
- Born: Albert Isaac Bezzerides; August 9, 1908; Samsun, Ottoman Empire
- Died: January 1, 2007 (aged 98); Los Angeles, California, U.S.
- Occupations: Novelist, screenwriter

Albert Isaac "Buzz" Bezzerides (buh ZER uh deez August 9, 1908 – January 1, 2007) was an American novelist and screenwriter, best known for writing films noir and action motion pictures, especially several of Warners' "social conscience" films of the 1940s.

== Personal life ==
Bezzerides was born in Samsun, Ottoman Turkey, to a Greek father and an Armenian mother, who emigrated to America before he was two years old. His father worked in farm fields before becoming a trucker hauling produce.

Bezzerides resided in Rudolph Schindler's Van Dekker House, Woodland Hills, California.

From the late 1940s on, Bezzerides' companion was Silvia Richards, a screenwriter; they married in 1953.

Bezzerides died at the Motion Picture & Television Hospital in Woodland Hills.

== Career ==
Bezzerides began writing short stories as a student at the University of California, Berkeley, where he studied electrical engineering. He was first published in a 1935 issue of Story Magazine, which printed his story, "Passage Into Eternity." He wrote the 1938 novel The Long Haul, about the trucking business. In 1940, Warner Bros. offered him $2,000 for movie rights to the story. He learned later that the script based on the book had already been written by others. The resulting film, They Drive By Night, starring Humphrey Bogart and George Raft, was a critical and commercial hit.

The studio also offered Bezzerides a contract to be a screenwriter at a salary of $300 a week. At the time, he was working as a communications engineer for the Los Angeles Department of Water and Power. He later commented, "I had no idea whether it was guilt or conscience, or greed to swindle more stories out of me, that motivated Warner Bros. to offer me a seven-year contract ... Whatever their reason, I grabbed their offer so I could quit my putrid career as a communications engineer by becoming a writer, writing scripts in an entirely new world.. His first screenplay was for 1942's Juke Girl, which starred Ann Sheridan and Ronald Reagan.

Films based on his novels or screenplays included Desert Fury (1947), Thieves' Highway (1949), On Dangerous Ground (1952), Beneath the 12 Mile Reef (1953) and Track of the Cat (1954). He wrote the screenplay for the 1962 espionage thriller The Angry Hills, which was set in Nazi-occupied Greece during World War II and based on a novel by Leon Uris. He wrote prolifically for television in the 1950s and '60s and was a co-creator of the Western television series The Big Valley.

Bezzerides' script for Kiss Me Deadly (1955) transformed the novel by Mickey Spillane into an apocalyptic, atomic-age paranoia film noir. When asked about his script, and his decision to make "the great whatsit" the Pandora's Box objective of a ruthless cast of characters, Bezzerides commented: "People ask me about the hidden meanings in the script, about the A-bomb, about McCarthyism, what does the poetry mean, and so on. And I can only say that I didn't think about it when I wrote it . . . I was having fun with it. I wanted to make every scene, every character, interesting. A girl comes up to Ralph Meeker, I make her a nympho. She grabs him and kisses him the first time she sees him. She says, "You don't taste like anybody I know." I'm a big car nut, so I put in all that stuff with the cars and the mechanic. I was an engineer, and I gave the detective the first phone answering machine in that picture. I was having fun."

== Work ==
=== Novels ===
- 1938 : The Long Haul
- 1942 : There Is a Happy Land
- 1949 : Thieves' Market. University of California Press. 1 January 1997. ISBN 978-0-520-20746-2.

=== Filmography ===
- They Drive By Night (1940, Warner Bros.) - based on his novel The Long Haul
- Juke Girl (1942, Warner Bros.) - co-sccreenplay
- Action in the North Atlantic (1943, Warner Bros.) - additional dialogue
- Desert Fury (1947, Paramount) - co-screenplay [uncredited]
- Thieves' Highway (1949, 20th Century-Fox) - screenplay, based on his novel Thieves' Market
- Sirocco (1951, Columbia) - co-screenplay
- On Dangerous Ground (1951, RKO) - co-screenplay, based on the novel Mad with Much Heart by Gerald Butler (writer)
- Holiday for Sinners (1952, MGM) - co-screenplay
- Beneath the 12-Mile Reef (1953, 20th Century-Fox) - screenplay
- Track of the Cat (1954, Warner Bros.) - screenplay, based on the novel by Walter Van Tillburg Clark
- A Bullet for Joey (1955, United Artists) - co-screenplay
- Kiss Me Deadly (1955, United Artists) - screenplay, based on the novel by Mickey Spillane
- The Angry Hills (1959, MGM) - screenplay, based on the novel by Leon Uris
- The Jayhawkers (1959, Paramount) - co-screenplay

== Legacy ==
- The Long Haul of A. I. Bezzerides, 2005
- Buzz 2006
