= The Tanks Are Coming =

The Tanks Are Coming may refer to:

- The Tanks Are Coming (1941 film), a short recruitment or propaganda film
- The Tanks Are Coming (1951 film), a war film
