= Companions in Nightmare =

- Directed by: Norman Lloyd
- Written by: Robert L. Joseph
- Produced by: Norman Lloyd
- Starring: Melvyn Douglas; Gig Young; Anne Baxter; Leslie Nielsen
- Cinematography: William Margulies
- Edited by: Douglas Stewart
- Music by: Bernard Herrmann
- Distributed by: Universal; NBC (Original Airing)
- Release date: November 23, 1968
- Running time: 100 minutes
- Country: United States
- Language: English

Companions in Nightmare is a 1968 crime-drama film. It had early roles for Louis Gossett Jr. and Bettye Ackerman, and it also starred Gig Young, Melvyn Douglas, Patrick O'Neal and Leslie Nielsen.

== Plot ==
Dr. Lawrence Strelson (Melvyn Douglas) is a famous psychiatrist who conducts a group-therapy session with several high-priced professionals. It turns out that one of the patients is a murderer; the truth will come out, and it will be a shocker. Among the special guest suspects are Eric Nicholson (Gig Young), Carlotta Mauridge (Anne Baxter), Jeremy Siddack (Patrick O'Neal), Julie Klanton (Dana Wynter) and Dr. Neesden (Leslie Nielsen).

== Cast ==
- Gig Young as Eric Nicholson
- Anne Baxter as Carlotta Mauridge
- Patrick O'Neal as Jeremy Siddack
- Dana Wynter as Julie Klanton
- Leslie Nielsen as Dr. Neesden
- Melvyn Douglas as Dr. Lawrence Strelson
- William Redfield as Richard Lyle
- Bettye Ackerman as Sara Nicholson
- Louis Gossett Jr. as Lt. Adam McKay
