= The Bigelow Theatre =

American TV anthology series (1950–1951)

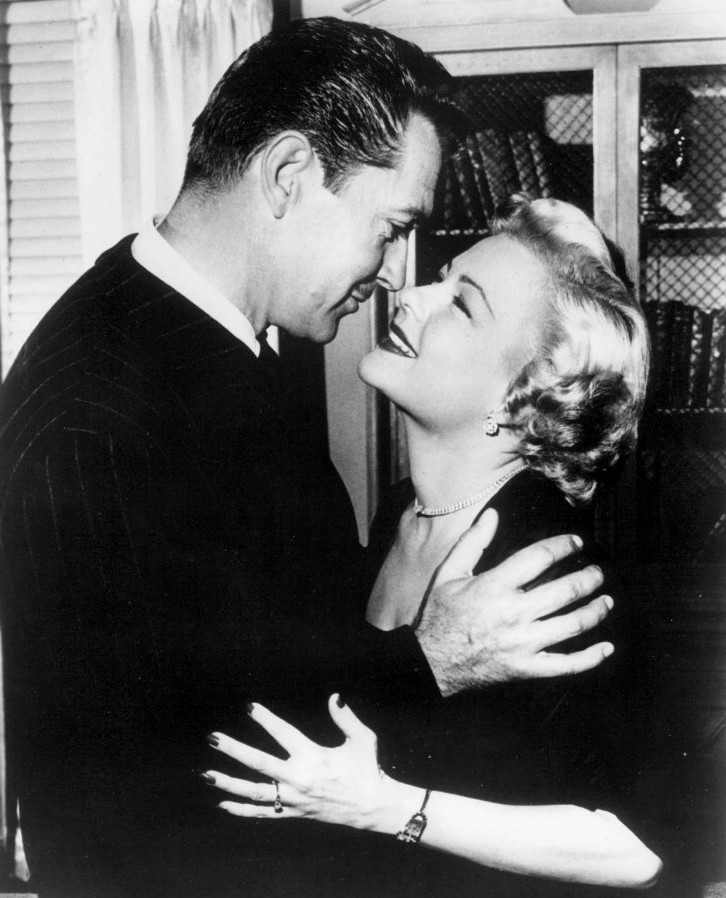
- Kent Taylor and Marjorie Reynolds in "A Case of Marriage" in October 1951.
- Also known as: Bigelow-Sanford Theater; Hollywood Half Hour; Marquee Theater
- Genre: Anthology
- Created by: Jerry Fairbanks
- Country of origin: United States
- Original language: English
- No. of episodes: 27 (CBS); 15 (DuMont)

Production
- Camera setup: Single-camera
- Running time: 25 mins.

Original release
- Network: CBS (1950-1951); DuMont (1951)
- Release: December 10, 1950 – December 27, 1951

The Bigelow Theatre (also known as Bigelow-Sanford Theater and as Hollywood Half Hour and Marquee Theater in syndication) is an American anthology series originally broadcast on CBS Television and on the DuMont Television Network.

This series is not to be confused with the similarly named The Bigelow Show, a musical variety program which aired on NBC and CBS in the late 1940s.

The series was sponsored by the Bigelow-Sanford Carpet Company.

== Broadcast history ==
The series aired on CBS on Sunday nights at 6pm EST from December 10, 1950, to June 3, 1951. There were no regularly featured actors on The Bigelow Theatre, but guest stars included James Dean, George C. Scott, Raymond Burr, Cesar Romero, Lloyd Bridges, Martin Milner, Gig Young, Ann Dvorak, Ruth Warrick, Gale Storm, and Chico Marx.

After the series ended on CBS because the network was unable to get enough stations to carry it, the show was retitled The Bigelow-Sanford Theatre and aired on DuMont on Thursdays at 10pm EST from September 6 through December 27, 1951. There were 27 episodes on CBS, and 15 on DuMont, however, some of the DuMont episodes were reruns of the CBS series.

Seventeen filmed episodes of the program were leased and run after having been shown originally on The Silver Theatre.

== Episode status ==
Nine episodes are held by the UCLA Film and Television Archive, at least two of which (October 4 and the December 27 finale) aired on DuMont.

Partial List of Episodes of The Bigelow Theatre
Date	Episode	Actor(s)
May 23, 1951	"Charming Billy"	Spring Byington, Mary Anderson.
September 6, 1951	"Mechanic on Duty"	Raymond, Storm
November 15, 1951	"A Woman's Privilege"	Don DeFore, John Howard, Greta Granstedt
December 20, 1951	"Agent from Scotland Yard"	Lynn Bari, Patric Knowles, Alan Mowbray
December 27, 1951	"Always a Bridesmaid"	DeFore, Audrey Long
March 11, 1951	"The First Hundred Years"	William Frawley, Barbara Whiting, Jimmy Lydon, Allene Roberts, Ted Osborn, Myra Marsh, Nana Bryant

== Production ==
The Bigelow Theatre was filmed in Los Angeles at Jerry Fairbanks's studios. Production of episodes used multiple cameras that were "directed and monitored by a control room staff" as was done with live TV, but the cameras' output was recorded on film. Frank Woodruff was the producer and director.

== Critical response ==
Jack Gould, reviewing the premiere episode in The New York Times, deemed it "acceptable". He complimented the work of the actors, led by Victor Jory, and wrote, "the work held interest and did not try to do too much in the limited time." The review's major complaint was about the use of film for the episode, "which was hard to watch in comparison with the quality of the average 'live' show."

A review of the September 6, 1951, episode in the trade publication Billboard said the story "while paper-thin, was nevertheless amusing light entertainment ..." It complimented the performances of Raymond and Storm, and it said the commercials "were well-filmed and not too intrusive, effectively dramatizing selling points."

== See also ==
- List of programs broadcast by the DuMont Television Network
- List of surviving DuMont Television Network broadcasts
- 1951-52 United States network television schedule

== Bibliography ==
- David Weinstein, The Forgotten Network: DuMont and the Birth of American Television (Philadelphia: Temple University Press, 2004) ISBN 1-59213-245-6
