= Holiday for Sinners =

1952 film

- Directed by: Gerald Mayer
- Written by: A.I. Bezzerides
- Based on: Days Before Lent; 1939 novel by Hamilton Basso
- Produced by: John Houseman
- Starring: Gig Young; Keenan Wynn; Janice Rule
- Cinematography: Paul C. Vogel
- Edited by: Fredrick Y. Smith
- Music by: Alberto Colombo
- Production company: Metro-Goldwyn-Mayer
- Distributed by: Metro-Goldwyn-Mayer
- Release dates: June 26, 1952 (Hartford, Connecticut); August 13, 1952 (Los Angeles); September 19, 1952 (New York)
- Running time: 72 minutes
- Country: United States
- Language: English
- Budget: $767,000
- Box office: $383,000

Holiday for Sinners is a 1952 American drama film directed by Gerald Mayer and starring Gig Young, Keenan Wynn and Janice Rule.

== Plot ==
Three men who were reared together in New Orleans have drifted apart as adults, each facing a crisis during the last weekend of Mardi Gras. Dr. Jason Kent must decide between a chance to become famous as a research scientist, which will mean leaving New Orleans and the girl he loves, or staying in his father's practice among the poor. Father Victor Carducci is refused permission to open a clinic and is considering leaving the church. Prizefighter Joe Piavi is barely surviving and is trying to collect $1,500 owed to him by his former manager Mike Hennighan. Brash reporter Danny Farber learns of the debt and needles Hennighan about Joe and then tells Joe that Henninghan is threatening to send him to an asylum.

== Cast ==
- Gig Young as Dr. Jason Kent
- Keenan Wynn as Joe Piavi
- Janice Rule as Susan Corvier
- William Campbell as Danny Farber
- Richard Anderson as Father Victor Carducci
- Michael Chekhov as Dr. Konndorff
- Sandro Giglio as Nick Muto
- Edith Barrett as Mrs. Corvier
- Porter Hall as Louie
- Ralph Dumke as Mike Hennighan
- Jack Raine as Dr. Surtees
- Frank Dekova as the Wiry Man
- Will Wright as the Man with a Cigar

== Release ==
Holiday for Sinners opened in Hartford, Connecticut on June 26, 1952.

== Reception ==
In a contemporary review for The New York Times, critic Oscar Godbout wrote: "The error of allowing a basic situation to be dissipated in irrelevancies has resulted, as it often does, in a weakened total impression ... ‘Holiday for Sinners,’ while lacking solidity, is worth seeing.”

According to MGM records, the movie earned $303,000 in the U.S. and Canada and $80,000 elsewhere, resulting in a loss to the studio of $562,000.
