= Come On Marines! =

1934 film by Henry Hathaway

- Theatrical poster
- Directed by: Henry Hathaway
- Written by: Joel Sayre; Byron Morgan (screenplay); Philip Wylie (story)
- Starring: Richard Arlen; Ida Lupino
- Edited by: James Smith
- Music by: Ralph Rainger
- Distributed by: Paramount Pictures
- Release date: March 23, 1934
- Running time: 70 minutes
- Country: United States
- Language: English

Come On Marines! is a 1934 American pre-Code drama film directed by Henry Hathaway and starring Richard Arlen and Ida Lupino.

== Plot ==
Ladies' man and U.S. Marines sergeant "Lucky" Davis is leading a squadron on an expedition through a Philippine jungle where an outlaw bandit is leading a guerrilla-war rebellion. Their assignment is to rescue a group of children from an island mission, but when they arrive, the troops are surprised to discover that the inhabitants are actually a group of young women blissfully bathing in a pool while awaiting rescue.

== Cast ==
- Richard Arlen as Lucky Davis
- Ida Lupino as Esther Smith-Hamilton
- Roscoe Karns as Spud McGurke
- Grace Bradley as Jojo La Verne
- Fuzzy Knight as Wimpy
- Monte Blue as Lt. Allen
- Ann Sheridan as Loretta (billed as Clara Lou Sheridan)
- Toby Wing as Dolly
- Lona Andre as Shirley

== Reception ==
In a contemporary review for The New York Times, critic Mordaunt Hall called the film a "sturdy comedy" but wrote: "When the picture tires of violent outbursts and slangy retorts, it turns to infantile patter as a means to stir up mirth. ... From the moment Lucky Davis appears on the screen one knows that he is going to get into hot water and likewise there is never the slightest doubt but that he and Esther Cabot, the dominant member of the stranded debutantes, will in the end be on their way to get married or that the handsome leatherneck will become an officer in the corps."
