= Ann Sheridan =

American actress and singer (1915–1967)

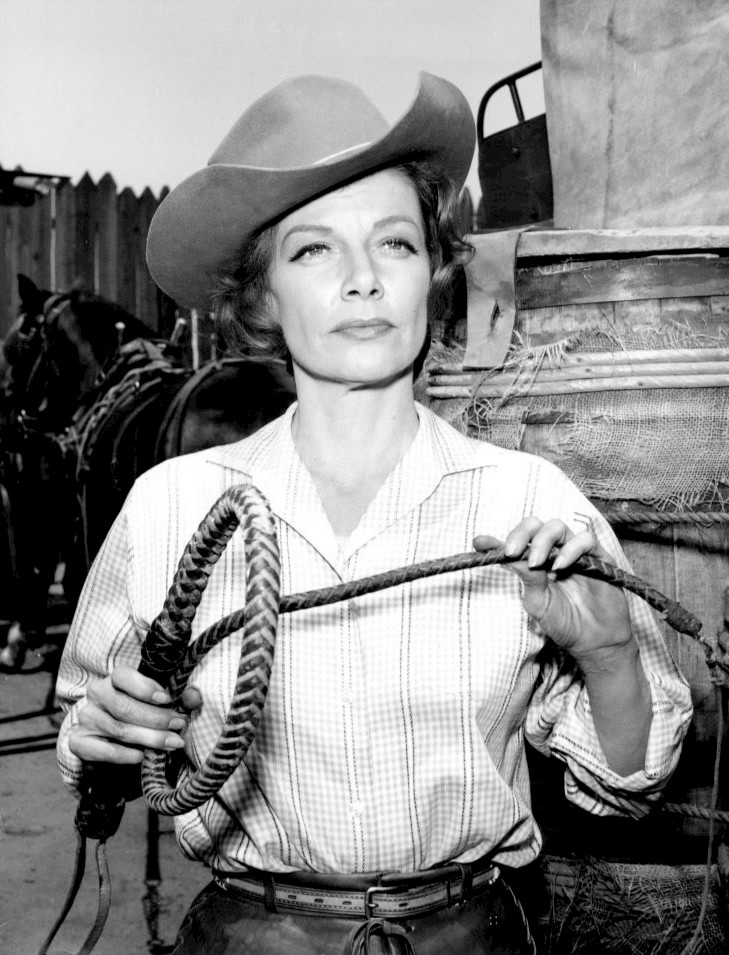
- Sheridan in Wagon Train, 1962
- Born: Clara Lou Sheridan; February 21, 1915; Denton, Texas, U.S.
- Died: January 21, 1967 (aged 51); Los Angeles, California, U.S.
- Resting place: Hollywood Forever Cemetery, Los Angeles, California, U.S.
- Occupations: Actress; singer
- Years active: 1934–1967
- Spouses: Edward Norris (m. 1936; div. 1938) George Brent (m. 1942; div. 1943) Scott McKay (m. 1966)
- Partner(s): Rodolfo Acosta (1953–1958)

Clara Lou "Ann" Sheridan (February 21, 1915 – January 21, 1967) was an American actress and singer. She is best known for her roles in the films San Quentin (1937), Angels with Dirty Faces (1938), They Drive by Night (1940), City for Conquest (1940), The Man Who Came to Dinner (1942), Kings Row (1942), Nora Prentiss (1947), and I Was a Male War Bride (1949).

== Early life ==
Sheridan was born in Denton, Texas, the youngest of five children of garage mechanic George W. Sheridan and Lula Stewart (née Warren). According to Sheridan, her father was a grandnephew of Civil War Union general Philip Sheridan.

She was active in dramatics at Denton High School, where she was class president, and at North Texas State Teachers College. She also sang with the college's stage band and played basketball on the North Texas women's basketball team. She said, "I can whistle through my fingers, bulldog a steer, light a fire with two sticks, shoot a pistol with fair accuracy, set type, and teach school." In 1933, at 18 years old, Sheridan won the prize of a bit part in an upcoming Paramount film, Search for Beauty, when her sister entered Sheridan's photograph into a beauty contest.

== Career ==
=== Paramount ===
After the release of Search for Beauty in 1934, Paramount put the 19-year-old under contract at a starting salary of $75 a week (equivalent to $1,810 in 2025), where she played mostly uncredited bit parts for the next two years. She can be glimpsed in the following 1934 films, and if credited, as Clara Lou Sheridan: Bolero, Come On Marines!, Murder at the Vanities, Shoot the Works, Kiss and Make-Up with Cary Grant, The Notorious Sophie Lang, College Rhythm (directed by Norman Taurog whom Sheridan admired), Ladies Should Listen with Cary Grant, You Belong to Me, Wagon Wheels, The Lemon Drop Kid with Lee Tracy, Mrs. Wiggs of the Cabbage Patch, Ready for Love, Limehouse Blues with George Raft and Anna May Wong, and One Hour Late.

Along with fellow contractees, Sheridan worked with Paramount's drama coach Nina Moise and performed on the studio lot in such plays as The Milky Way and The Pursuit of Happiness. While in The Milky Way, Paramount decided to change her first name from Clara Lou to the same as her character Ann.

Sheridan was then cast in the film Behold My Wife! (1934) at the behest of director and friend Mitchell Leisen. The role provided two standout scenes for the actress, including one in which her character commits suicide, to which she attributed Paramount's keeping her under contract.

She continued with bit parts in Enter Madame (1935) with Elissa Landi and Cary Grant, Home on the Range (1935) with Randolph Scott and Evelyn Brent, and Rumba (1935) with George Raft and Carole Lombard, until her first lead role in Car 99 (1935), with Fred MacMurray. "No acting, it was just playing the lead, that's all", she later said. She next had a support role as the romantic interest in Rocky Mountain Mystery (1935), a Randolph Scott Western.

She then appeared in Mississippi (1935) with Bing Crosby and W. C. Fields, The Glass Key (1935) with George Raft in a brief speaking role for which she was billed as "Nurse" in the cast list at the end of the film, and (having one line) The Crusades (1935) with Loretta Young. In her last picture under her deal with Paramount, the studio loaned her out to Poverty Row production company Talisman to make The Red Blood of Courage (1935) with Kermit Maynard. After this, Paramount declined to renew her contract. Sheridan made Fighting Youth (1935) at Universal and then signed a contract with Warner Bros. in 1936.

=== Warner Bros. ===
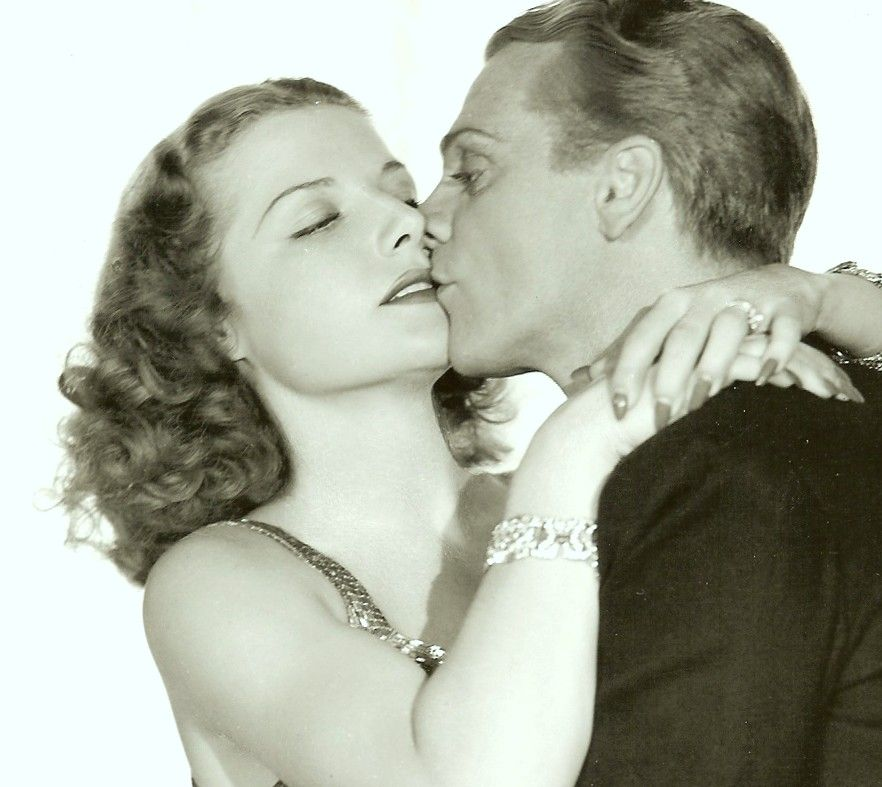
Sheridan and James Cagney in Angels with Dirty Faces (1938)

Sheridan's career prospects began to improve at her new studio. Her early films for Warner Bros. included Sing Me a Love Song (1936); Black Legion (1937) with Humphrey Bogart; The Great O'Malley (1937) with Pat O'Brien and Bogart, her first real break; San Quentin (1937), with O'Brien and Bogart, singing for the first time in a film; and Wine, Women and Horses (1937) with Barton MacLane.

Sheridan moved into B picture leads: The Footloose Heiress (1937); Alcatraz Island (1937) with John Litel; and She Loved a Fireman (1937) with Dick Foran for director John Farrow. She was a lead in The Patient in Room 18 (1937) and its sequel Mystery House (1938). Sheridan was in Little Miss Thoroughbred (1938) with Litel for Farrow and supported Dick Powell in Cowboy from Brooklyn (1938).

Universal borrowed her for a support role in Letter of Introduction (1938) at the behest of director John M. Stahl. For Farrow, she was in Broadway Musketeers (1938), a remake of Three on a Match (1932).

Sheridan's notices in Letter of Introduction impressed Warner Bros. executives and she began to get roles in better-quality pictures at her own studio starting with Angels with Dirty Faces (1938), wherein she played James Cagney's love interest; Bogart, O'Brien and the Dead End Kids had supporting roles. The film was a big hit and critically acclaimed.

Sheridan was reunited with the Dead End Kids in They Made Me a Criminal (1938) starring John Garfield. She was third-billed in the Western Dodge City (1939), playing a saloon owner opposite Errol Flynn and Olivia de Havilland. The film was another success.

=== Oomph girl ===
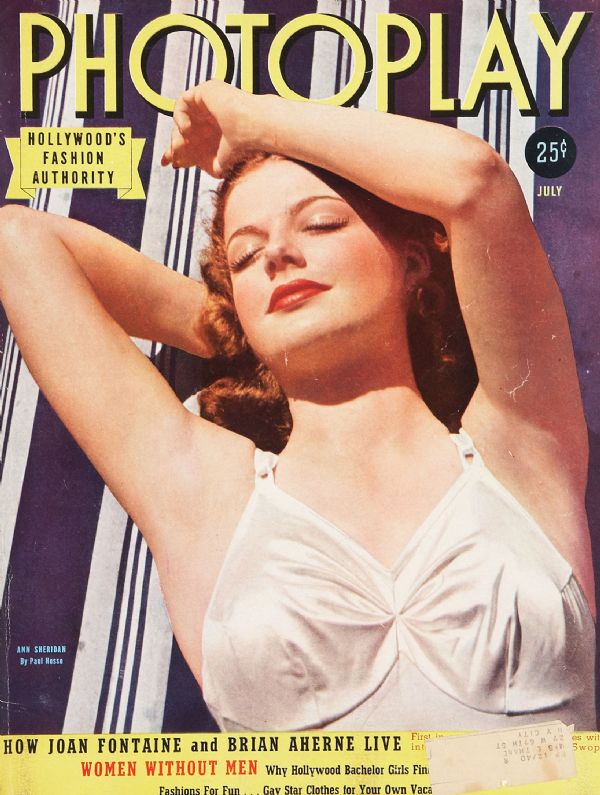
Sheridan in 1940

In March 1939, Warner Bros. announced Sheridan had been voted by a committee of 25 men as the actress with the most "oomph" in America. "Oomph" was described as "a certain indefinable something that commands male interest".

She received as many as 250 marriage proposals from fans in a single week. Sheridan reportedly loathed the sobriquet that made her a popular pin-up girl in the early 1940s. However, she expressed in a February 25, 1940, news story distributed by the Associated Press that she no longer "bemoaned the 'oomph' tag." She continued, "But I'm sorry now. I know if it hadn't been for 'oomph' I'd probably still be in the chorus."

This was later referenced and spoofed in the 1941 animated short Hollywood Steps Out.

=== Stardom ===
Sheridan co-starred with Dick Powell in Naughty but Nice (1939) and played a wacky heiress in Winter Carnival (1939).

She was top billed in Indianapolis Speedway (1939) with O'Brien and Angels Wash Their Faces (1939) with the Dead End Kids and Ronald Reagan. Castle on the Hudson (1940) put her opposite Garfield and O'Brien.

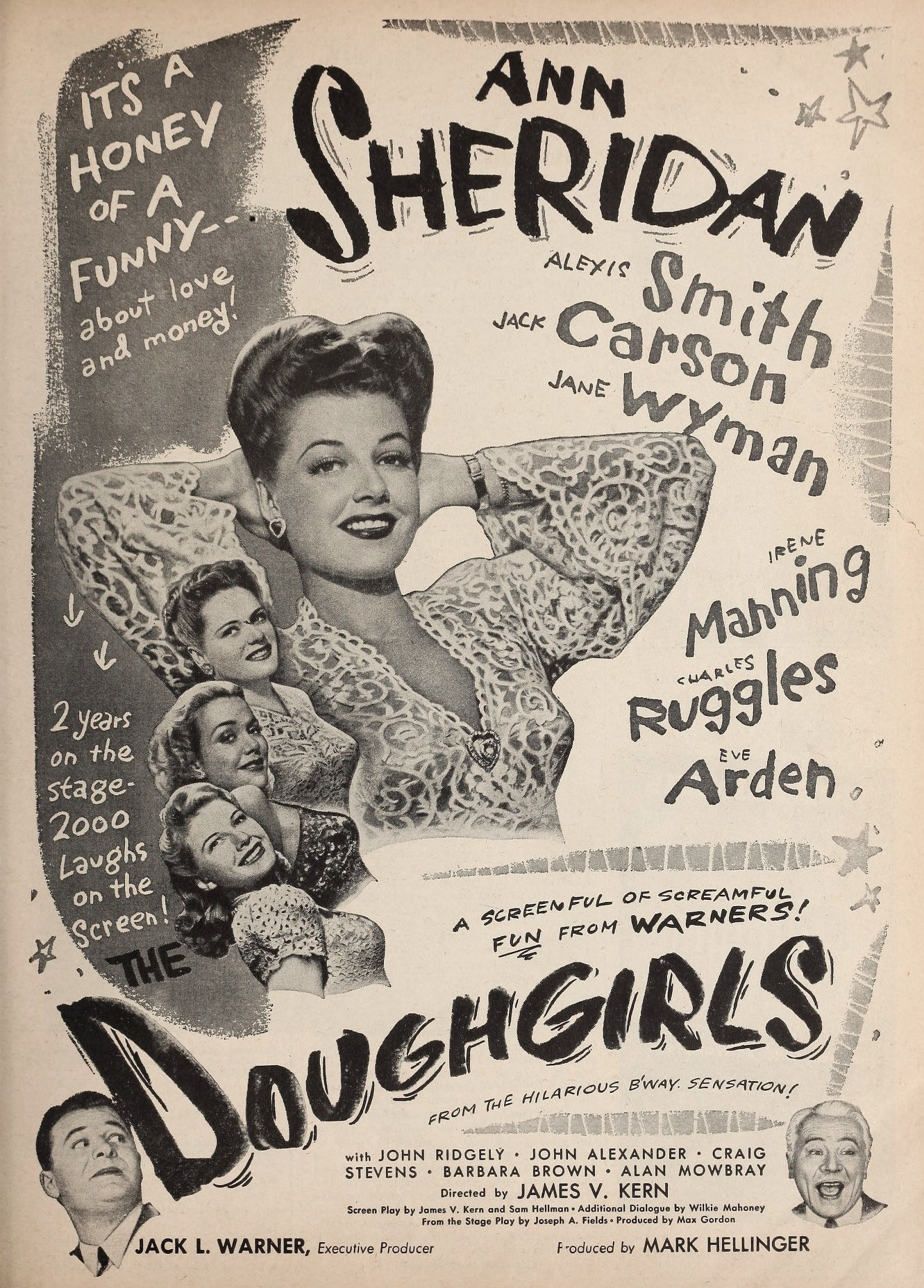
Magazine ad for The Doughgirls (1944)

Sheridan's first real starring vehicle was It All Came True (1940), a musical comedy costarring Bogart and Jeffrey Lynn. She introduced the song "Angel in Disguise".

Sheridan and Cagney were reunited in Torrid Zone (1940) with O'Brien in support. She was with George Raft, Bogart and Ida Lupino in They Drive by Night (1940), a smash-hit trucking melodrama. Sheridan was back with Cagney for City for Conquest (1941) and then made Honeymoon for Three (1941), a comedy with George Brent.

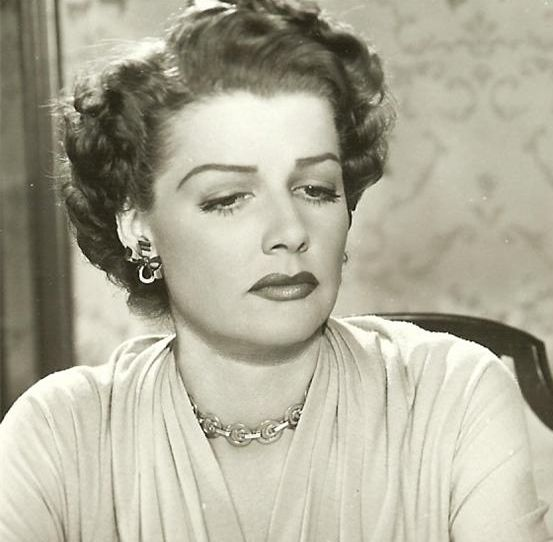
Sheridan in 1950

Sheridan did two lighter films: Navy Blues (1941), a musical comedy, and The Man Who Came to Dinner (1942) with Bette Davis, wherein she played a character modeled on Gertrude Lawrence. She then made Kings Row (1942), in which she received top billing playing opposite Ronald Reagan, Robert Cummings, and Betty Field. It was a major success and one of Sheridan's most memorable films.

Sheridan and Reagan were reunited for Juke Girl (1942) released about six weeks after Kings Row. She was in the war film Wings for the Eagle (1942) and made a comedy with Jack Benny, George Washington Slept Here (1943). She played a Norwegian resistance fighter in Edge of Darkness (1943) with Errol Flynn and was one of the many Warner Bros. stars who had cameos in Thank Your Lucky Stars (1943).

She was the heroine of a novel, Ann Sheridan and the Sign of the Sphinx, written by Kathryn Heisenfelt and published by Whitman Publishing Company in 1943. While the heroine of the story was identified as a famous actress, the stories were entirely fictitious. The story was probably written for a young teenaged audience and is reminiscent of the adventures of Nancy Drew. It is part of a series known as "Whitman Authorized Editions", 16 books published between 1941 and 1947 that always featured a film actress as heroine.

Sheridan was given the lead in the musical Shine On, Harvest Moon (1944), playing Nora Bayes, opposite Dennis Morgan. She was in a comedy, The Doughgirls (1944).

Sheridan was absent from screens for over a year, touring with the USO to perform in front of the troops as far afield as China. She returned in One More Tomorrow (1946) with Morgan. She had an excellent role in the noir Nora Prentiss (1947), which was a hit. It was followed by The Unfaithful (1948), a remake of The Letter, and Silver River (1948), a Western melodrama with Errol Flynn.

Leo McCarey borrowed her to support Gary Cooper in Good Sam (1948). She was meant to star in Flamingo Road. She then left Warner Bros., saying: "I wasn't at all satisfied with the scripts they offered me."

=== Freelance star ===
Her role in I Was a Male War Bride (1949), directed by Howard Hawks and starring Cary Grant, was another success. In 1950, she appeared on the ABC musical television series Stop the Music.

She made Stella (1950), a comedy with Victor Mature at Fox.

In April 1949, she announced she wanted to produce Second Lady, a film based on a story by Eleanore Griffin. She was going to make My Forbidden Past (originally titled Carriage Entrance) at RKO. They fired her and Sheridan sued for $250,000 (equivalent to $3.4 million today) The New York Times reported the amount as $350,000 ($4.7 million today). Sheridan ultimately won $55,162 ($750,000 today).

=== Universal ===
Sheridan made Woman on the Run (1950), a noir also starring Dennis O'Keefe which she produced. She wanted to make a film called Her Secret Diary.

Woman on the Run was distributed by Universal, and Sheridan signed a contract with that studio. While there, she made Steel Town (1952), Just Across the Street (1952), and Take Me to Town (1953), a comedy with Sterling Hayden that was the first film directed by Douglas Sirk in the United States.

=== Later career ===
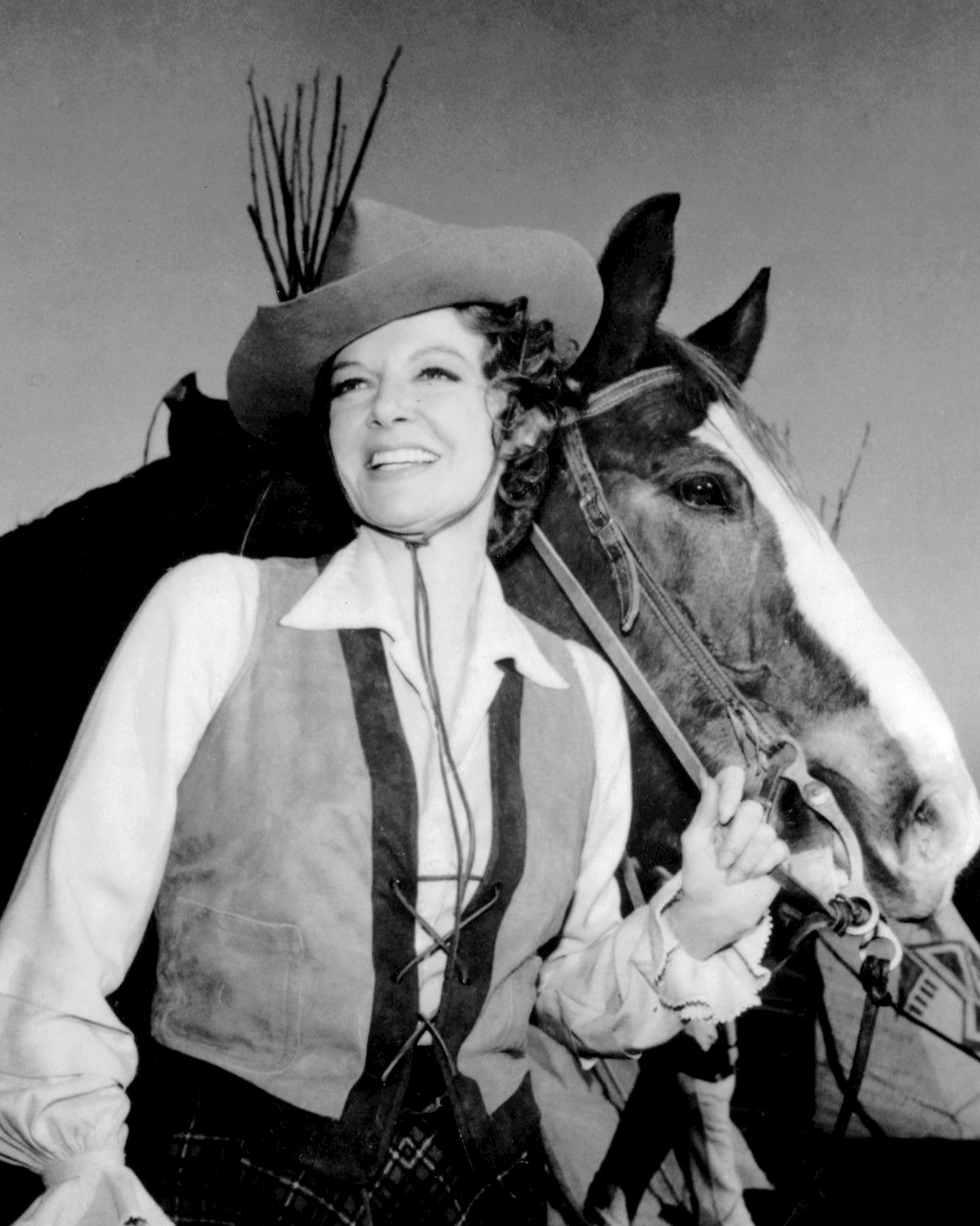
Pistols 'n' Petticoats

Sheridan starred with Glenn Ford in Appointment in Honduras (1953), directed by Jacques Tourneur. She appeared opposite Steve Cochran in Come Next Spring (1956) and was one of several stars in MGM's The Opposite Sex (1956), a remake of The Women starring June Allyson, Joan Collins, Dolores Gray, Sheridan and Ann Miller. Her last film, Woman and the Hunter (1957), was shot in Africa.

She performed in stage tours of Kind Sir (1958) and Odd Man In (1959), and The Time of Your Life at the Brussels World Fair in 1958. In all three shows, she acted with Scott McKay, whom she later married.

In 1962, she played the lead in the Western series Wagon Train episode titled "The Mavis Grant Story".

In the mid-1960s, Sheridan appeared on the NBC soap opera Another World.

Her final role was as Henrietta Hanks in the television comedy Western series Pistols 'n' Petticoats, which was filmed while she became increasingly ill in 1966, and was broadcast on CBS on Saturday nights. The 19th episode of the series, "Beware the Hangman", aired as scheduled on the same day that she died in 1967.

For her contributions to the motion picture industry, Ann Sheridan has a star on the Hollywood Walk of Fame at 7024 Hollywood Boulevard.

== Personal life ==
Sheridan married actor Edward Norris August 16, 1936, in Ensenada, Mexico. They separated a year later and divorced in 1939. On January 5, 1942, she married fellow Warner Bros. star George Brent, who co-starred with her in Honeymoon for Three (1941); they divorced exactly one year later. Following her divorce from Brent, she had a long-term relationship with publicist Steve Hannagan that lasted until his death in 1953. Hannagan bequeathed Sheridan $218,399 (equivalent to $2.6 million today).

Sheridan engaged in a romantic affair with Mexican actor Rodolfo Acosta, with whom she appeared in 1953's Appointment in Honduras. She and the married Acosta shared an apartment in Mexico City for several years, and Sheridan was charged with criminal adultery in Mexican federal court in October, 1956, following an accusation by Acosta's wife, Jeanine Cohen Acosta. Mexican authorities issued a warrant for Sheridan's arrest. Nothing came of the criminal charges, and the relationship ended c. 1958.

On June 5, 1966, Sheridan married actor Scott McKay, who was with her when she died seven months later.

Sheridan supported Thomas E. Dewey in the 1948 presidential elections.

== Death ==
In 1966, Sheridan began starring in a new television series, a Western-themed comedy called Pistols 'n' Petticoats. She became ill during the filming and died of esophageal cancer with massive liver metastases, at age 51, on January 21, 1967, in Los Angeles. She was cremated and her ashes were interred in the private vault at Chapel of the Pines Crematory in Los Angeles until they were reinterred in a niche in the Chapel Columbarium at the Hollywood Forever Cemetery in 2005.

== Biography ==
Michael D. Rinella, Ann Sheridan - The Life and Career of Hollywood's Oomph Girl. McFarland Publishers. 2024 ISBN 9781476694184

== Filmography ==
Year	Film	Role	Notes
1934	Search for Beauty	Dallas Beauty Winner	uncredited
1934	Bolero	Minor Role	uncredited
1934	Come On Marines!	Loretta	
1934	Murder at the Vanities	Earl Carroll Girl	uncredited
1934	Many Happy Returns	Chorine	uncredited
1934	Shoot the Works	Hanratty's Secretary	uncredited
1934	Kiss and Make Up	Beautician	
1934	The Notorious Sophie Lang	Mannequin	uncredited
1934	Ladies Should Listen	Adele	
1934	You Belong to Me	Wedding Party Guest	uncredited
1934	Wagon Wheels	Young Lady	uncredited
1934	The Lemon Drop Kid	Minor Role	uncredited
1934	Mrs. Wiggs of the Cabbage Patch	Town Girl	uncredited
1934	College Rhythm	Chorine / Gloves Salesgirl	uncredited
1934	Ready for Love	Priscilla at Basket Social	uncredited
1934	Star Night at the Cocoanut Grove	Sands of the Desert Model	Short; uncredited
1934	Behold My Wife	Mary White	
1934	Limehouse Blues	Minor Role	uncredited
1934	One Hour Late	Girl	uncredited
1935	Enter Madame	Flora's Shipboard Friend	
1935	Home on the Range	Singer	
1935	Rumba	Chorus Girl	uncredited
1935	Car 99	Mary Adams	
1935	Rocky Mountain Mystery	Rita Ballard	
1935	Mississippi	Schoolgirl	uncredited
1935	The Red Blood of Courage	Elizabeth Henry	
1935	The Glass Key	Nurse	
1935	The Crusades	Christian Slave Girl	uncredited
1935	Hollywood Extra Girl	Genevieve	Documentary short
1935	Fighting Youth	Carol Arlington	
1937	Sing Me a Love Song		
1937	Black Legion	Betty Grogan	
1937	The Great O'Malley	Judy Nolan	
1937	San Quentin	May Kennedy aka May De Villiers	
1937	The Footloose Heiress	Kay Allyn	
1937	Wine, Women and Horses	Valerie	
1937	Alcatraz Island	Flo Allen	
1937	She Loved a Fireman	Marjorie "Margie" Shannon	
1938	The Patient in Room 18	Sarah Keate	
1938	Mystery House	Sarah Keate	
1938	Out Where the Stars Begin	Herself	Short; uncredited
1938	Little Miss Thoroughbred	Madge Perry Morgan	
1938	Cowboy from Brooklyn	Maxine Chadwick	
1938	Letter of Introduction	Lydia Hoyt	
1938	Broadway Musketeers	Fay Reynolds Dowling	
1938	Angels with Dirty Faces	Laury Martin	
1939	They Made Me a Criminal	Goldie	
1939	Dodge City	Ruby Gilman	
1939	Naughty but Nice	Zelda Manion	
1939	Indianapolis Speedway	"Frankie" Merrick	
1939	Winter Carnival	Jill Baxter	
1939	The Angels Wash Their Faces	Joy Ryan	
1940	Castle on the Hudson	Kay	
1940	It All Came True	Sarah Jane Ryan	
1940	Torrid Zone	Lee Donley	
1940	They Drive by Night	Cassie Hartley	
1940	City for Conquest	Peggy Nash	
1941	Honeymoon for Three	Anne Rogers	
1941	Navy Blues	Marge Jordan	
1942	The Man Who Came to Dinner	Lorraine Sheldon	
1942	Kings Row	Randy Monaghan	
1942	Juke Girl	Lola Mears	
1942	Wings for the Eagle	Roma Maple	
1942	George Washington Slept Here	Connie Fuller	
1943	Edge of Darkness	Karen Stensgard	
1943	Thank Your Lucky Stars	Ann Sheridan	
1944	Shine On, Harvest Moon	Nora Bayes	
1944	The Doughgirls	Edna Stokes Cadman	
1946	Cinderella Jones	Red Cross Nurse	uncredited
1946	One More Tomorrow	Christie Sage	
1947	The Unfaithful	Chris Hunter	
1947	Nora Prentiss	Nora Prentiss	
1948	Silver River	Georgia Moore	
1948	Good Sam	Lu Clayton	
1949	I Was a Male War Bride	1st Lt. Catherine Gates	
1950	Stella	Stella Bevans	
1950	Woman on the Run	Eleanor Johnson	also co-producer
1952	Steel Town	"Red" McNamara	
1952	Just Across the Street	Henrietta Smith	
1953	Take Me to Town	Vermilion O'Toole aka Mae Madison	
1953	Appointment in Honduras	Sylvia Sheppard	
1956	Come Next Spring	Bess Ballot	
1956	Sneak Preview	Terry Conway	TV series Episode: "Calling Terry Conway"
1956	The Opposite Sex	Amanda Penrose	
1957	Woman and the Hunter	Laura Dodds	
1962	Wagon Train	Mavis Grant	TV series Episode: "The Mavis Grant Story"
1967	The Far Out West	Henrietta "Hank" Hanks	archive footage

== Radio appearances ==
Year	Program	Episode	Ref
1943	Screen Guild Players	Love Is News	
1952	Stars in the Air	Good Sam	

== Honors ==
Year	Organization	Category	Work	Result	Ref.
1960	Hollywood Walk of Fame	Star - Motion Pictures	—N/a	Honored	
