= The Neon Ceiling =

1971 American television film

- Genre: Drama
- Teleplay by: Carol Sobieski; Howard Rodman (as Henri Simoun)
- Story by: Carol Sobieski
- Directed by: Frank Pierson
- Starring: Gig Young; Lee Grant
- Music by: Billy Goldenberg
- Country of origin: United States
- Original language: English

Production
- Producer: William Sackheim
- Cinematography: Edward Rosson
- Editor: Robert F. Shugrue
- Running time: 100 minutes
- Production company: Universal Television

Original release
- Network: NBC
- Release: February 8, 1971

The Neon Ceiling is a 1971 American drama television film starring Gig Young and Lee Grant that aired on NBC Monday Night at the Movies. It was written by Carol Sobieski and directed by Frank Pierson. The film score was composed by Billy Goldenberg.

== Plot ==
An unhappy housewife takes her precocious teenage daughter and leaves their suburban home in the middle of the night, stopping at a lonely diner in the California desert when her 1960 Ford Galaxie runs into car trouble. She runs up against, and eventually befriends, the diner's owner, a gruff, beer-drinking mechanic and artist whose life's work are the neon sculptures he creates and attaches to the ceiling.

== Cast ==
- Gig Young as Jones
- Lee Grant as Carrie Miller
- Denise Nickerson as Paula Miller
- Herb Edelman as Harry
- William Smithers as Doctor Miller
- Robert Pratt as Carnival Boy
- James McEachin as Highway Patrolman

== Production ==
Lee Grant was set to appear in a TV film of The Price with George C. Scott when Universal sent her the script for “The Neon Ceiling”. "The moment I read that script I was hooked and couldn't let it go", she said. "It's a real departure from what is normally seen on TV."

== Reception ==
The Los Angeles Times called it "an extraordinary experience... a work of art."

== Awards and nominations ==
| Year | Award | Category | Nominee(s) | Result | Ref. |
|---|---|---|---|---|---|
| 1971 | Primetime Emmy Awards | Outstanding Single Performance by an Actor in a Leading Role | Gig Young | Nominated | |
| 1971 | Primetime Emmy Awards | Outstanding Single Performance by an Actress in a Leading Role | Lee Grant (Note: Also nominated in the same category for an episode of Columbo.) | Won | |
| 1971 | Primetime Emmy Awards | Outstanding Achievement in Cinematography for Entertainment Programming – For a Special or Feature Length Program Made for Television | Edward Rosson | Nominated | |
| 1971 | Primetime Emmy Awards | Outstanding Achievement in Film Editing for Entertainment Programming – For a Special or Feature Length Program Made for Television | Robert F. Shugrue | Nominated | |
