= Ninotchka (1960 film) =

- Directed by: Tom Donovan
- Written by: Roger O. Hirson (1960 adaptation); Melchior Lengyel (story)
- Screenplay by: Charles Brackett (1939 screenplay)); Walter Reisch (1939 screenplay); Billy Wilder (1939 screenplay)
- Based on: Ninotchka; 1939 film by Ernst Lubitsch
- Produced by: David Susskind
- Starring: Maria Schell; Gig Young; Zsa Zsa Gabor
- Distributed by: American Broadcasting Company
- Release date: April 20, 1960 (United States)
- Country: United States
- Language: English

Ninotchka is a 1960 American TV film. It is a remake of the 1939 Greta Garbo film Ninotchka. It was directed by Tom Donovan.

== Plot summary ==
Ninotchka (Maria Schell) is a dedicated Soviet official on assignment in Paris to barter jewels for farm machinery. Her perspective on life changes when she falls in love.

== Cast ==
- Maria Schell as Ninotchka
- Gig Young as Leon
- Zsa Zsa Gabor
- Leon Belasco as Iranoff
- Mischa Auer as Buljanoff
- Henry Lascoe as Kopalski
- Friedrich von Ledebur
- William Hansen
- Gerald Hiken
- Anne Meara as Anna
- Boris Tumarin

== Production ==
It was one of a series of movies that David Susskind and his Talent Associates adapted for television. The starring role was given to Maria Schell who had just appeared in a TV adaptation of For Whom the Bell Tolls. Schell said she had not seen the film. She added that Billy Wilder told her "This is a girl who feels she has to be in love with mankind -and she falls in love with a man."

== Reception ==
The Los Angeles Times called it an "expert production". The Chicago Tribune said Schell "couldn't have been a bigger hit." The New York Times called it a "highly polished production" which had "dated".
