= The Long Haul (novel) =

1938 novel by A. I. Bezzerides

- Author: A. I. Bezzerides
- Language: English
- Publication date: 1938

The Long Haul, originally Long Haul, is a 1938 novel by American writer A. I. Bezzerides that depicts the lives of truckers. Its central characters are Nick & Paul Benay, who transport fruit and other perishable goods between Northern and Southern California. It was adapted into the 1940 film They Drive by Night, starring George Raft and Humphrey Bogart. In the movie, the brothers name were changed to Joe (George Raft) and Paul Fabrini (Humphrey Bogart). The book was also reprinted with the title They Drive by Night, published by Dell (book #416.)
