= Nora Prentiss =

1947 film by Vincent Sherman

- Theatrical release poster
- Directed by: Vincent Sherman
- Screenplay by: N. Richard Nash
- Story by: Paul Webster; Jack Sobell
- Produced by: William Jacobs
- Starring: Ann Sheridan; Kent Smith; Bruce Bennett; Robert Alda
- Cinematography: James Wong Howe
- Edited by: Owen Marks
- Music by: Franz Waxman
- Production company: Warner Bros. Pictures
- Distributed by: Warner Bros. Pictures
- Release date: February 21, 1947 (New York City)
- Running time: 111 minutes
- Country: United States
- Language: English
- Budget: $1,487,000
- Box office: $2.4 million (US rentals) or $3,324,000

Nora Prentiss is a 1947 American film noir directed by Vincent Sherman and starring Ann Sheridan, Kent Smith, Bruce Bennett, and Robert Alda. It was produced and distributed by Warner Bros. Pictures. The cinematography is by James Wong Howe and the music was composed by Franz Waxman. The film's sets were designed by the art director Anton Grot.

== Plot ==
Dr. Richard Talbot, unhappy with the dull routine of his married life in San Francisco, meets nightclub singer Nora Prentiss by chance after he sees her get struck by a truck near his office. The two gradually begin to have an affair, causing disruption in Richard's home and professional lives. He tries to cool things down with Nora after he forgets his daughter's birthday, but, when Nora says she wants to break things off entirely and he is so shaken that he almost kills a patient during surgery, he realizes he is not willing to lose her. Not knowing how to ask his wife for a divorce, he seizes an opportunity to fake his death when a patient who looks somewhat like him and who he knows does not have any family or friends dies in his office. He puts his wedding ring on the corpse, puts the body in his car, and sets the car on fire and pushes it off a cliff before moving with Nora to New York with a large sum of money he has withdrawn from the bank. Shortly after arriving, Richard learns that the circumstances surrounding his death are under investigation.

Richard does not tell Nora what he has done until it becomes clear that she is not buying his fake explanations for why he is living under an alias and never wants to leave their hotel. Even though the truth means they will not be able to get married and that Richard will not be able to practice medicine any more, Nora says she will stick by him and starts singing at the new club her boss from San Francisco has opened in New York. Left alone while she rehearses, Richard begins to drink heavily and becomes increasingly jealous. While fleeing the scene after a fight with Nora's boss, he crashes his car and his face is badly cut and burned. The police, not realizing who the injured man is, arrest Richard as a suspect in the murder of Dr. Talbot when his fingerprints are found to be a match with some found at the crime scene.

Back in San Francisco, Richard refuses to reveal his identity or speak in his defense, since he feels that doing so will only serve to cause his family more suffering because he has already ruined any chance he may have had at a tolerable future. He convinces Nora to help him keep his secret so that he can be convicted and executed for his own murder.

== Cast ==
- Ann Sheridan as Nora Prentiss
- Kent Smith as Dr. Richard Talbot
- Bruce Bennett as Dr. Joel Merriam, Richard's business partner
- Robert Alda as Phil Dinardo, a nightclub owner
- Rosemary DeCamp as Lucy Talbot, Richard's wife
- John Ridgely as Walter Bailey, a patient who dies in Richard's office
- Robert Arthur as Gregory Talbot, Richard's son
- Wanda Hendrix as Bonita 'Bunny' Talbot, Richard's daughter
- Helen Brown as Miss Judson, Richard and Joel's nurse
- Rory Mallinson as Fleming, Richard's lawyer
- Henry Shannon as Police Lieutenant
- James Flavin as District Attorney
- Douglas Kennedy as Doctor
- Don McGuire as Truck Driver
- Clifton Young as Policeman

== Reception ==
=== Box office ===
According to records at Warner Bros., the film earned $2,229,000 in the U.S. and $1,095,000 in other markets.

=== Critical response ===
When the film was released, the staff at Variety gave the film an unfavorable review:

Nora Prentiss is an overlong melodrama, a story of romance between a married man and a girl. But it's never quite believable. Ann Sheridan makes much of her role but the production has unsympathetic slant for leads and a lack of smoothness...Sheridan is the singer, and has two tunes to warble. As the doctor, Kent Smith is okay dramatically in a part that doesn't hold much water. Bruce Bennett, co-starred, has little to do as a medico friend of Smith.

The New York Times recapped its plot and continued, "the playing of the story is every bit as ridiculous as its sounds. Miss Sheridan is practically a cipher and Kent Smith, who plays the poor doc, gives a walking representation of a love-smitten telephone pole. Nobody else really figures. This is major picture-making at its worst."

The Brooklyn Eagle review was mixed: “Miss Sheridan…acquits herself beautifully, acts the rest of the cast into the shadow, and brings a ray of distinction to a screenplay that otherwise might have been an entirely conventional affair. That doesn’t mean…that all of the shortcomings of ‘Nora Prentiss’ as a film story disappear at the wave of Miss Sheridan’s magic wand. But ‘Nora Prentiss’ does take on a degree of sincereity, at times even of genuine credibility, thanks to her honest portrayal of a nightclub singer in love with a prominent married doctor who hasn’t the courage to ask his wife for a divorce….There is a startling twist in the plot of ‘Nora Prentiss’ that promises for a time to be another prop to this wobbly romantic triangle….That gives the proceedings a new lease on life until the climax comes along to convert ‘Nora Prentiss’ into just another of the screen’s far-fetched melodramas.”

=== Noir analysis ===
Film historian Bob Porfirio wrote (1993): "If there were a category of 'women's noir,' Nora Prentiss should certainly rank at the top. Unlike such other Ann Sheridan or Joan Crawford motion pictures as The Unfaithful, Flamingo Road, and The Damned Don't Cry!, Nora Prentiss does not lapse into a romantic melodrama that might detract from the maudit sensibility, the quintessential element of film noir."
