= They Drive by Night =

1940 film by Raoul Walsh

- Theatrical release poster
- Directed by: Raoul Walsh; Hugh MacMullen (dialogue)
- Screenplay by: Jerry Wald; Richard Macaulay
- Based on: Long Haul; 1938 novel by A. I. Bezzerides
- Produced by: Mark Hellinger
- Starring: George Raft; Ann Sheridan; Ida Lupino; Humphrey Bogart
- Cinematography: Arthur Edeson
- Edited by: Thomas Richards
- Music by: Adolph Deutsch
- Production company: Warner Bros. Pictures
- Distributed by: Warner Bros. Pictures
- Release dates: July 26, 1940 (New York City); August 3, 1940 (U.S.)
- Running time: 93 minutes
- Country: United States
- Language: English
- Budget: $539,000
- Box office: $1,596,000

They Drive by Night is a 1940 American film noir directed by Raoul Walsh and starring George Raft, Ann Sheridan, Ida Lupino, and Humphrey Bogart, and featuring Gale Page, Alan Hale, Roscoe Karns, John Litel and George Tobias. The picture involves a pair of embattled truck drivers and was released in the UK under the title The Road to Frisco. The film was based on A. I. Bezzerides' 1938 novel Long Haul, which was later reprinted under the title They Drive by Night to capitalize on the success of the film. They Drive by Night was also the sixth film collaboration between Sheridan and Bogart, after San Quentin, The Great O'Malley, and Black Legion (all 1937), Angels with Dirty Faces (1938), and It All Came True (1940).

Part of the film's plot – that of Ida Lupino's character murdering her husband by carbon monoxide poisoning – was borrowed from another Warner Bros. film, Bordertown (1935) with Paul Muni and Bette Davis.

== Plot ==
Brothers Joe and Paul Fabrini are independent truck drivers who make a meager living transporting goods. Joe convinces Paul to start their own small, one-truck business, staying one step ahead of loan shark Farnsworth, who is trying to repossess their truck.

At a diner, Joe is attracted to waitress Cassie Hartley. Later, on their way to Los Angeles, the brothers pick up a hitchhiker; Joe is pleased when it turns out to be Cassie, who quit after her boss tried to get a bit too friendly with her. They park at a diner for a meal and chat with a trucker acquaintance, McNamara, who is extremely overworked and tired; later, back on the road, the brothers and Cassie find themselves driving behind McNamara and soon become aware that he must be asleep at the wheel. They put themselves in danger trying to awaken him, but McNamara's truck goes off the road and explodes in flames.

At his home just outside of Los Angeles, Paul is reunited with his patient though worried wife, Pearl, who would rather have Paul settle down in a safer, more regular job. Paul is troubled about his future, too, but will not leave his brother "out on a limb as long as he thinks we have a chance in this business". In the city, Joe finds Cassie a place to stay. They talk and begin to establish a relationship.

The next morning, from a window overlooking the market, Joe's good friend Ed Carlsen watches Joe get into a brief fistfight. Ed is a trucking business owner and former driver; he calls Joe up to his office and offers him a job. Joe insists on remaining independent. Ed's wife, Lana Carlsen, has wanted Joe for years, but he has always rebuffed her advances.

Ed gives Joe a tip on a load which results in the brothers earning enough money to finally pay off Farnsworth. On the return trip, Paul falls asleep at the wheel, causing an accident which costs him his right arm and wrecks the truck. Joe feels guilty on account of how his brother had wanted to take a break, but Joe had convinced him to keep going in order to finish the job.

When Ed hires Joe as a driver, Lana persuades her husband to make him the traffic manager instead; she starts dropping by the office frequently. Joe continues to spurn her advances. One night, when Lana drives a drunk, unconscious Ed home from a party, she murders him on impulse by leaving him in the garage with the car motor still idling. When the police investigate, it appears to be an accident. She later gives Joe a half-interest as a partner in the business in a subsequent attempt to attract him.

Paul has been bitter over his inability to land a proper job in order to support his wife and plan a family. He returns to work as a dispatcher for Joe. Joe does a fine job managing the business, but when Lana learns he plans to marry Cassie, she becomes so enraged she reveals to him that she killed Ed so that she could have him. She then goes to the police, accusing Joe of forcing her to help commit murder. Joe is tried based on no evidence except Lana's accusation. During the trial, a guilt-ridden Lana breaks down on the witness stand, laughing hysterically and claiming the electric garage doors made her do it. After Lana is determined to be insane, the case is dismissed.

Joe considers going back to the road, but Cassie, Paul - who happily announces that Pearl and he are having a baby - and the boys manage to convince him otherwise. He thus returns to the trucking business that he had dreamed of owning, with his brother as traffic manager and Cassie as his bride-to-be.

== Cast ==
- George Raft as Joe Fabrini
- Ann Sheridan as Cassie Hartley
- Ida Lupino as Lana Carlsen
- Humphrey Bogart as Paul Fabrini
- Gale Page as Pearl Fabrini
- Alan Hale Sr. as Ed J. Carlsen
- Roscoe Karns as "Irish" McGurn
- John Litel as Harry McNamara
- George Tobias as George Rondolos

Uncredited

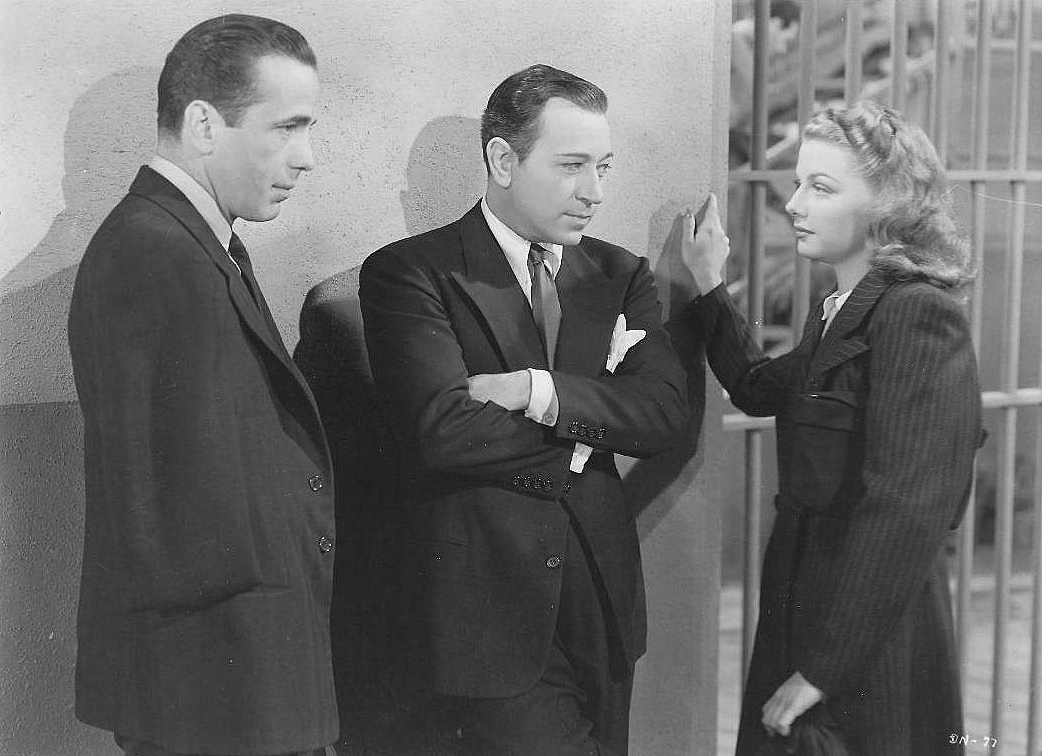
Left to right: Bogart, Raft, and Sheridan.

- Henry O'Neill as District Attorney
- Charles Haltom as Farnsworth, the loan shark
- John Ridgely as Hank Dawson
- George Lloyd as Barney
- Joyce Compton as Sue Carter
- Charles C. Wilson as Mike Williams
- Pedro Regas as McNamara's Helper
- Joe Devlin as Fatso
- William Haade as Driver
- Vera Lewis as Landlady
- John Hamilton as Defense Attorney
- Lillian Yarbo as Chloe

== Production ==
Production on They Drive by Night began in late April 1940.

Walsh said Raft's acting "had improved" since they worked together on The Bowery (1933). "He was better at memorizing dialogue and he was careful about the way he dressed."

== Home media ==
They Drive by Night was first released on DVD by Warner Bros. Discovery Home Entertainment (then-Warner Home Video) on November 4, 2003. It was then re-released for the same format on June 27, 2017, as part of the Warner Archive Collection. The film was released on Blu-ray on March 26, 2024, as part of Warner Archive.

== Reception ==
=== Box office ===
The film was a big box office success. According to Warner Bros., it earned $1,092,000 domestically and $504,000 foreign in its initial run. Raft's biographer claims the film eventually earned $4 million.

=== Critical response ===
When the film was released, The New York Times film critic, Bosley Crowther, gave the film a positive review, writing, "But for fanciers of hard-boiled cinema, They Drive By Night still offers an entertaining ride. As Mr. Raft modestly remarks of his breed, 'We're tougher than any truck ever come off an assembly line.' That goes for the picture, too."

Filmink magazine called it "a sensationally entertaining flick that was a solid box office success and should have convinced Raft that his new employers knew what they were doing, but his judgement continued to get worse. "

The film review aggregator website Rotten Tomatoes reported that 94% of critics gave the film a positive review, based on 17 reviews.

== Adaptations ==
Lux Radio Theatre presented a radio adaptation of the film in 1941 starring Raft, Lana Turner and Lucille Ball.
