= Broadway Musketeers =

1938 film by John Farrow

- Directed by: John Farrow
- Written by: Don Ryan; Kenneth Gamet
- Produced by: Bryan Foy
- Starring: Margaret Lindsay; Ann Sheridan; Marie Wilson; John Litel; Janet Chapman
- Cinematography: L. William O'Connell
- Edited by: Thomas Pratt
- Production company: Warner Bros.–First National
- Distributed by: Warner Bros. Pictures
- Release date: October 8, 1938
- Running time: 62–63 minutes
- Country: United States
- Language: English

Broadway Musketeers is a 1938 American musical drama film directed by John Farrow for Warner Bros. Pictures. Starring Margaret Lindsay, Ann Sheridan and Marie Wilson as three women who grew up in an orphanage and cross paths later in life, it is a remake of the Warners pre-code crime drama film, Three on a Match.

== Plot ==
Isabel Dowling, Fay Reynolds, and Connie Todd are three women who grew up together in an orphanage, and who meet again later in life. Each woman's life has taken a very different path: Isabel is married with a young daughter, Connie is an office secretary, and Fay performs in nightclubs. The three are reunited when Fay is arrested for performing a striptease, and Isabel and Connie arrive to bail her out. They make plans to keep in touch every year on the same day, at the same restaurant.

Isabel is bored and unhappy in her marriage. Her husband, Stanley Dowling, goes away to California. When she and Connie go to a nightclub to watch Fay sing, she meets gambler Phil Peyton and they soon begin an affair. They are in an automobile accident that makes the headlines just as Stanley returns to New York. Their daughter's nurse, Anna, meets the train and tells him about the affair. At the hospital, Fay tries unsuccessfully to cover for Isabel. Dowling divorces Isabel and retains custody of their daughter Judy. Isabel marries Phil, whose gambling soon ruins them. Meanwhile, Fay and Stanley fall in love and marry.

Isabel has been separated from her daughter for some time when Fay takes pity on her and one day allows her to take Judy for a visit. Phil puts the child up as security against his debts. The gangsters to whom he owes money discover he has deceived them. They kill Phil in retribution and decide to hold on to Judy, planning to demand a ransom, and leaving police to assume that Isabel killed Phil. Eventually, Isabel overhears the gangsters deciding to kill the two of them to cover their crimes. One of them, Milt, has grown fond of Judy. He protests and is killed. In a bid to save her daughter, Isabel tears the front page off a newspaper with the headline "Held by Murder Gang" over photos of herself and Judy, clutches it in her fist, and plunges through a closed window to die on the pavement below, trading her life to reveal Judy's whereabouts to police. Judy is rescued. At the trio's next ritual birthday meeting—a celebration of Connie's impending marriage to her boss, who turns out to be love-sick rather than hypochondriacal— little Judy arrives to take her mother's place at the table.

== Cast ==
- Margaret Lindsay as Isabel Dowling
- Ann Sheridan as Fay Reynolds
- Marie Wilson as Connie Todd
- John Litel as Stanley Dowling
- Janet Chapman as Judy Dowling
- Richard Bond as Phil Peyton
- Dick Purcell as Vincent Morrell
- Anthony Averill as Nick
- Horace MacMahon as Gurk
- Dewey Robinson as Milt
- Dorothy Adams as Anna
- James Conlon as Skinner
- Jan Holm as Schoolteacher

== Production ==
The film was announced in May 1938 under the title Three Girls on Broadway.

The black-and-white film was produced from late May to late June 1938. At the end of filming Sheridan had her contract renewed for three years and Lyndsay's for two years.

M.K. Jerome and Jack Scholl wrote two songs for the film, both sung by Sheridan: "Has It Ever Occurred to You?" and "Who Said That This Isn't Love?"

== Release ==
Released October 8, 1938, Broadway Musketeers garnered tepid to poor reviews. The New York Times reviewer Frank Nugent compared the film to a nightmare in its difficulty to follow, while Variety called it "a programmer of average distinction". The review in Film Daily found the cast superior to the story, saying that the plot elements did not "add up". An Orlando Sentinel reviewer called it a "sordid melodrama."

Decades later, Leonard Maltin gave the film two and a half out of four stars in his Movie Guide and called it "a snappy remake ... with some interesting plot variations".
