= Southside 1-1000 =

1950 film by Boris Ingster

- Theatrical release poster
- Directed by: Boris Ingster
- Screenplay by: Boris Ingster; Leo Townsend
- Story by: Bert C. Brown; Milton M. Raison
- Produced by: Frank King; Maurice King
- Starring: Don DeFore; Andrea King; George Tobias
- Narrated by: Gerald Mohr
- Cinematography: Russell Harlan
- Edited by: Christian Nyby
- Music by: Paul Sawtell
- Production company: King Brothers Productions
- Distributed by: Allied Artists Pictures
- Release date: November 12, 1950 (United States)
- Running time: 73 minutes
- Country: United States
- Language: English

Southside 1-1000 is a 1950 semidocumentary-style film noir directed by Boris Ingster featuring Don DeFore, Andrea King, George Tobias and Gerald Mohr as the off-screen narrator. Based on a true story, it is about a Secret Service agent (DeFore) who goes undercover and moves into a hotel run by a beautiful female manager (King), so that he can investigate a counterfeiting ring. The agent is up against hardened felons such as the gang member played by Tobias, an unusual example of casting against type for the typically comic actor. It is one of Ingster's two films noir, the other being Stranger on the Third Floor (1940), an early picture in the genre.

== Plot ==
The US Secret Service searches for a gang of counterfeiters, whose brilliant engraver Eugene Deane (Morris Ankrum) has secretly made his plates while doing life in San Quentin. A priest was tricked into serving as a mule smuggling them out. A narrator explains the crucial role of paper currency in underpinning trade in the economy, and how the US Treasury Department ensures it is safeguarded by tracking down counterfeiters.

When phony $10 bills start showing up at casinos and racetracks across the country the Treasury realizes that the bills are Deane's work. Surveillance is set up, which leads to a travelling salesman who has been distributing them across the country. However, before he can be captured and interrogated a ruthless gang member (George Tobias) throws him out a window to his death.

The Secret Service then puts undercover agent John Riggs (Don DeFore) on the case. He poses as a thief interested in buying and selling counterfeit bills. Clues leads him to a Los Angeles hotel where the salesman lived. Riggs moves in, and is recruited by gang members. He also meets the beautiful hotel manager, Nora Craig (Andrea King).

While Riggs is romantically attracted to Craig, he also realizes that she may be connected to the gang. He learns she is not only the gang boss but Deane's daughter. Riggs' cover is blown and he is threatened with death. Federal agents and police descend on the gang's hideout, which catches fire. A pitched gun battle erupts amidst cable car rail trestles and bridges, with Craig plunging to her death.

== Cast ==
- Don DeFore as John Riggs/Nick Starnes
- Andrea King as Nora Craig
- George Tobias as Reggie
- Barry Kelley as Bill Evans
- Morris Ankrum as Eugene Deane
- Robert Osterloh as Albert
- Charles Cane as Harris
- Kippee Valez as Singer
- Joe Turkel as Frankie
- John Harmon as Nimble Willie
- G. Pat Collins as Hugh B. Pringle – Treasury Agent
- Douglas Spencer as Prison Chaplain
- Joan Miller as Mrs. Clara Evans
- William Forrest as Prison Warden

== Production ==
A scene towards the end was filmed aboard Los Angeles' famed "Angels Flight", a narrow gauge funicular railway in the Bunker Hill district of Downtown.

It was the last in a series of movies King Brothers Productions made for Allied Artists.

== Reception ==
A November 1950 review in The New York Times commented: "In the cinema's library of routine gangster fiction, Southside 1-1000 merits a comfortable middle-class rating being neither especially exciting nor particularly dull".

Film critic Craig Butler of Allmovie wrote, "Southside 1-1000 is a good pseudo-noir film told in pseudodocumentary fashion, but it also must register as a bit of a disappointment. It's functional and all the parts fit together smoothly, making it run like a fairly well-oiled machine -- but it lacks real spark. Given director Boris Ingster's impressive work on the seminal Stranger on the Third Floor, one expects something a bit more unusual or off the beaten path – or at least distinctive. Instead, Southside looks like it could have been the work of any competent director". In 2012 Michael Barrett of PopMatters rated it 4/10 stars and called it "an unnecessary and forgettable entry in the genre".
