= Torrid Zone =

1940 film by William Keighley

- Theatrical poster
- Directed by: William Keighley
- Written by: Richard Macaulay; Jerry Wald
- Produced by: William Cagney (uncredited)
- Starring: James Cagney; Ann Sheridan; Pat O'Brien
- Cinematography: James Wong Howe
- Edited by: Jack Killifer
- Music by: Adolph Deutsch
- Distributed by: Warner Bros. Pictures
- Release dates: May 18, 1940 (New York City); May 25, 1940 (US)
- Running time: 88 minutes
- Country: United States
- Language: English

Torrid Zone is a 1940 adventure film directed by William Keighley and starring James Cagney, Ann Sheridan, and Pat O'Brien. The supporting cast features Andy Devine and George Reeves.

== Plot ==
Steve Case has to deal with trouble at his tropical fruit company's Central American banana plantation. A revolutionary, Rosario La Mata, is stirring up unrest among the workers, and the only man who can handle the situation, foreman Nick Butler, has just quit. Steve manages to persuade Nick to stick around (for a big bonus). Adding to the complications is Lee Donley, a woman whom Steve has ordered out of the region for causing a different kind of trouble among the men.

== Cast ==
- James Cagney as Nick Butler
- Ann Sheridan as Lee Donley
- Pat O'Brien as Steve Case
- Andy Devine as Wally Davis
- Helen Vinson as Mrs. Gloria Anderson
- Jerome Cowan as Bob Anderson
- George Tobias as Rosario La Mata
- George Reeves as Sancho
- Victor Kilian as Carlos
- Frank Puglia as Police Chief Juan Rodriguez
- Frank Yaconelli as Lopez
- Dick Botiller as Hernandez
