= Juke Girl =

1942 film by Curtis Bernhardt

- Directed by: Curtis Bernhardt
- Screenplay by: A. I. Bezzerides
- Story by: Kenneth Gamet
- Based on: Land of the Jook; 1941 article in The Saturday Evening Post by Theodore Pratt
- Produced by: Jack Saper; Jerry Wald
- Starring: Ann Sheridan; Ronald Reagan; Richard Whorf
- Cinematography: Bert Glennon
- Edited by: Warren Low
- Music by: Adolph Deutsch
- Production company: Warner Bros. Pictures
- Distributed by: Warner Bros. Pictures
- Release date: May 30, 1942
- Running time: 90 minutes
- Country: United States
- Language: English
- Box office: $1.1 million (US rentals)

Juke Girl is a 1942 American drama film directed by Curtis Bernhardt, written by A. I. Bezzerides, and starring Ann Sheridan and Ronald Reagan. The supporting cast includes Richard Whorf, George Tobias, Gene Lockhart, Alan Hale Sr., Howard Da Silva, Donald MacBride, Faye Emerson, Willie Best, and Fuzzy Knight. The plot focuses on the plight of exploited farmers and farmworkers in the South. When released, one of the film's taglines read, "Shapely Ann Sheridan is starred with Ronald Reagan in the story of a dime-a-dance girl who discovers her veneer of hardness is not so solid as she had thought."

== Plot ==
Farm workers Steve and Danny seek jobs in the fields surrounding Cattail, Florida, a small town where businessman Henry Madden runs just about everything. This includes Muckeye John's Club, the area's principal amusement center. Madden also owns a big packing plant, the town's largest source of jobs. Madden uses strong-arm tactics to prevent local farmers from selling their crops directly to anyone but himself—and usually on consignment. Danny likes Madden's set-up. He gets a job at the plant and soon moves up the organization's ladder. But Steve, who was raised on a small Kansas farm, refuses to work for Madden, a man who takes every possible advantage of the plight suffered by farmers during the Great Depression.

Steve meets and falls in love with Lola Mears, a "juke girl" employed at Muckeye's. They befriend farmer Nick Garcos, a hard-working Greek immigrant who bucks Madden's monopoly by selling his crops directly to an Atlanta food distributor. This small revolt is almost foiled by Madden's henchmen, but Steve deliberately stalls one of Nick's hired trucks at the distributor's only entrance gate. He refuses to move the vehicle until a deal for Nick's entire crop is completed. This daring strategy works, and Nick, for the first time in his life, is a successful farmer. Upon his return to Cattail, Nick celebrates his victory over Madden at Muckeye's, where he becomes completely pie-eyed.

Feeling good about everything and everyone, he approaches Madden, who is working on his books alone at the plant. Nick's intention is to befriend his old antagoist, but Madden will have none of it. He tells Nick to leave the premises. Nick refuses. In the fight that inevitably results, Nick is accidentally killed by Madden, who then attempts to frame Steve and Lola for murder. Madden's guilt, however, is uncovered, resulting in the arrest and certain imprisonment of the area's biggest employer. As a result, Cattail is no longer the boom town it once was. Steve and Lola, along with Madden's ex-employees, decide to pack up and resume their lives elsewhere.

== Cast ==
- Ann Sheridan as Lola Mears
- Ronald Reagan as Steve Talbot
- Richard Whorf as Danny Frazier
- George Tobias as Nick Garcos
- Gene Lockhart as Henry Madden
- Alan Hale as Yippee
- Betty Brewer as Skeeter
- Howard Da Silva as Cully
- Donald MacBride as "Muckeye" John
- Willard Robertson as Mister Just
- Faye Emerson as Violet "Murph" Murphy
- Willie Best as Jo-Mo

== Production ==
The picture was released a month after Kings Row, which also starred Sheridan and Reagan as a couple.
