= The Silver Theatre =

American anthology TV series (1949–1950)

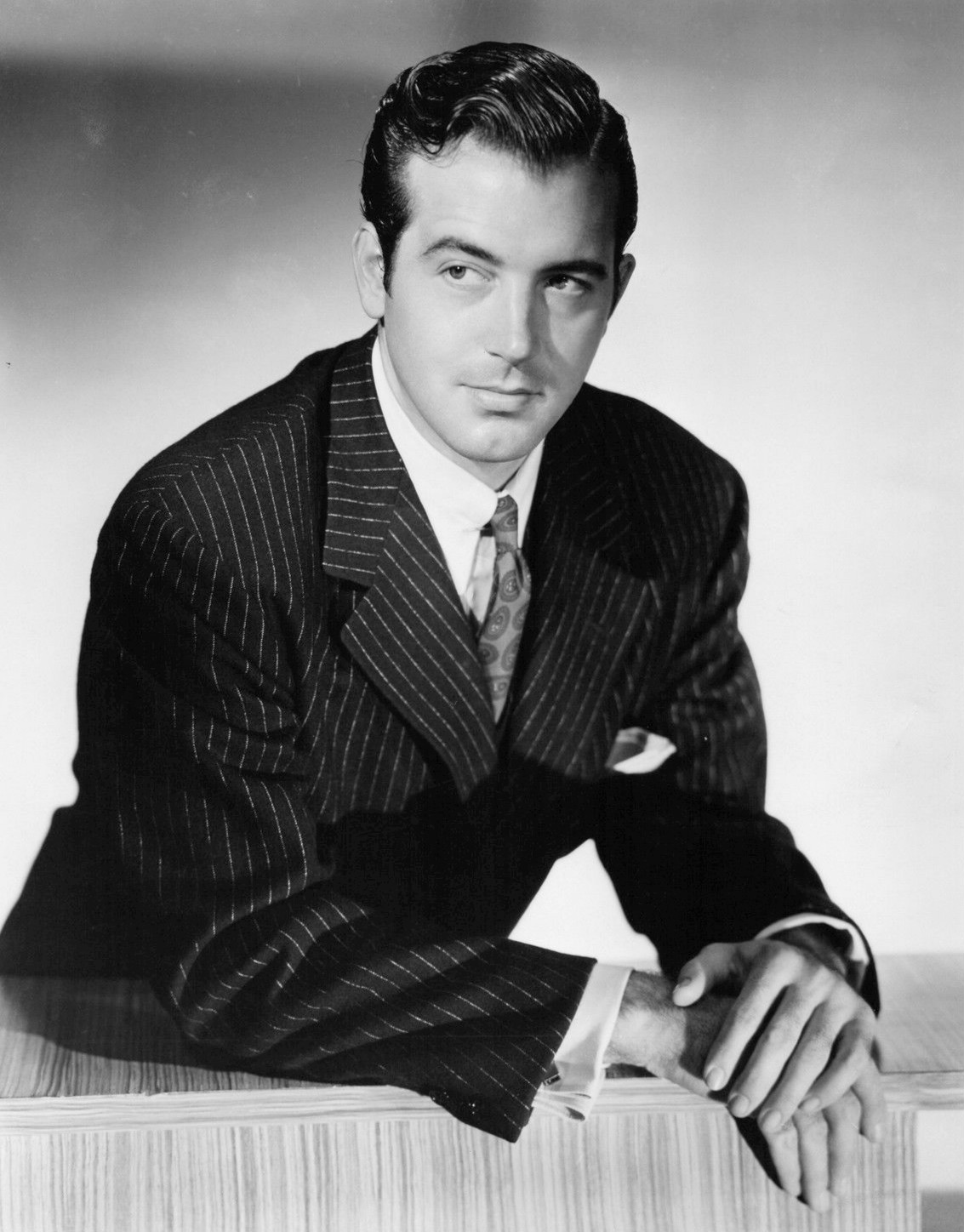
John Payne appeared in the Silver Theatre presentation of "School for Love" in 1949

The Silver Theatre is an American television series that was broadcast on CBS from October 3, 1949, to June 26, 1950, and was hosted by Conrad Nagel. It was also known as Silver Theater.

Most of the show's episodes focused on "the humorous, silly, frustrating, futile, and rewarding aspects" of romance.

Among its guest stars were Hugh Beaumont, Ward Bond, Ann Dvorak, William Frawley, Eva Gabor, Margaret Hamilton, Marsha Hunt, Kim Hunter, Paul Lukas, Diana Lynn, Burgess Meredith, Felicia Montealegre Bernstein, John Payne, George Reeves, and Gig Young.

Each month a group of dramatic critics selected the winner of the Silver Award, which went to "the most deserving supporting performer" in the episodes presented that month.

== Episodes ==
Selected Episodes of Silver Theatre
Date	Title	Actor(s)
October 3, 1949	"L'Amour the Merrier"	Gabor, Meredith, Nagel
October 10, 1949	"'Til Death Do Us Part"	John Loder, Faye Emerson
October 17, 1949	"Rhapsody in Discord"	Paul Lukas, Kim Hunter
October 31, 1949	"Farewell Supper"	Charles Korvin
November 21, 1949	"Silent as the Grave	George Reeves, Marsha Hunt
December 26, 1949	"Four Callers"	Donald Buke, Mary K. Wells, Florence Robinson, Vaughn Taylor, Jim Engler
January 2, 1950	"The First Show of 1950"	George Reeves, Joyce Mathews
February 20, 1950	"My Brother's Keeper"	Bond, Glenn Corbett
April 10, 1950	"Minor Incident"	Nancy Kelly
April 24, 1950	"Bad Guy"	Lee Bowman, John Archer, Barbara Lawrence
May 1, 1950	"The First Hundred Years"	Barbara Whiting, Frawley, Jimmy Lydon, Allene Roberts
May 8, 1950	"Lady with Ideas"	Pamela Britton, Young, Mikhail Rasumny
May 15, 1950	"Papa Romani"	Frawley, Hamilton, Chico Marx
June 12, 1950	"My Heart's in the Highlands"	Howard da Silva

== Production ==
Frank Telford was the program's producer and director. Richard Stark was the announcer. The show was sponsored by the International Silver Company and was broadcast from 8 to 8:30 p.m. Eastern Time on Mondays. Its competition included The Chevrolet Tele-Theatre on NBC.

Episodes were presented live until February 20, 1950, when the program's first filmed episode, "My Brother's Keeper", was shown. Production techniques were similar to those for live broadcasts except for the use of film in the cameras. The change was "the initial attempt by video producers to overcome the deficiencies of kinescope recordings". By early March 1950, executives at the Young & Rubicam agency decided to film more episodes of the show "on a mass production basis on the Coast." Broadcasts originated from WCBS-TV.

Seventeen filmed episodes of the program were leased and rerun as episodes of The Bigelow Theatre.
