= The Spiral Staircase (1961 film) =

- Based on: Some Must Watch by Ethel Lina White
- Written by: Mel Dinelli
- Directed by: Boris Sagal
- Starring: Elizabeth Montgomery; Lillian Gish; Gig Young

Production
- Producer: Fred Coe
- Running time: 60 minutes

Original release
- Release: October 4, 1961

The Spiral Staircase is a 1961 American television film. It is a television adaptation of Ethel Lina White's novel Some Must Watch which was filmed in 1946 as The Spiral Staircase. It was directed by Boris Sagal.

== Plot summary ==
Helen Warren is a beautiful, mute girl, due to a childhood trauma, who unfortunately becomes the target of a mysterious killer who preys on young women with disabilities. There are many suspects at the mansion, and Helen feels she is the next victim. Eventually, she discovers the killer's identity, and they come face to face.

== Cast ==
- Elizabeth Montgomery as Helen Warren
- Lillian Gish as Mrs. Warren
- Gig Young as Stephen Warren
- Edie Adams as Blanche
- Eddie Albert as Albert Warren
- Jeffrey Lynn as Doctor Parry
- Frank McHugh as Constable Williams

== Production ==
The production was the idea of David Susskind who originally wanted Jane Fonda to play the lead.

It was part of a series on NBC called Theatre '62. Spiral Staircase was to be the first of eight productions of David O. Selznick movies. Eventually the lead role went to Elizabeth Montgomery and her then-husband Gig Young.

== Reception ==
"It was a routine play but they made it look pretty good", said the Los Angeles Times.
