= George Tobias =

American actor (1901–1980)

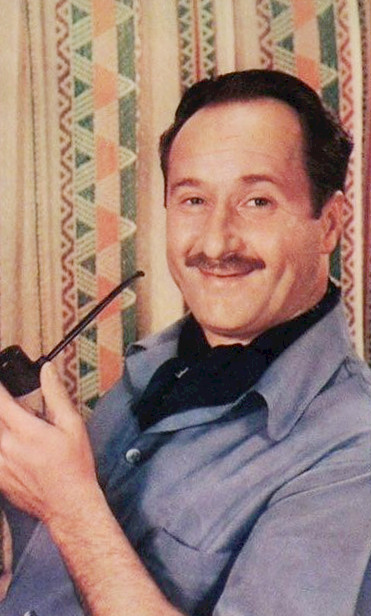
- Tobias in 1942
- Born: July 14, 1901; New York City, U.S.
- Died: February 27, 1980 (aged 78); Los Angeles, California, U.S.
- Resting place: Mount Carmel Cemetery, Glendale, Queens, New York City
- Occupation: Actor
- Years active: 1923–1977

George Tobias (July 14, 1901 – February 27, 1980) was an American theater, film and television actor. He had character parts and supporting roles in several major films of Hollywood's Golden Age. He is also known for his role as Abner Kravitz on the TV sitcom Bewitched from 1964 to 1971.

== Early life ==
Tobias was born in New York City on July 14, 1901, the younger of two sons of Russian-Jewish immigrants Esther and Samuel Tobias, both of whom were active in the Yiddish theatre, as was his older brother Benjamin. Far removed from the stereotypical stage parents, both Mr. and Mrs. Tobias did their utmost to discourage the acting bug in their youngest:

[T]hey made up their minds very definitely that I was not going to spend my life nearly starving as they did. They wanted me to be a doctor or lawyer, but I knew from a very early age that I would follow the same career as my mother, father and brother...So whenever I got an acting job in between my other jobs, I had to keep it secret from my family.

== Career ==
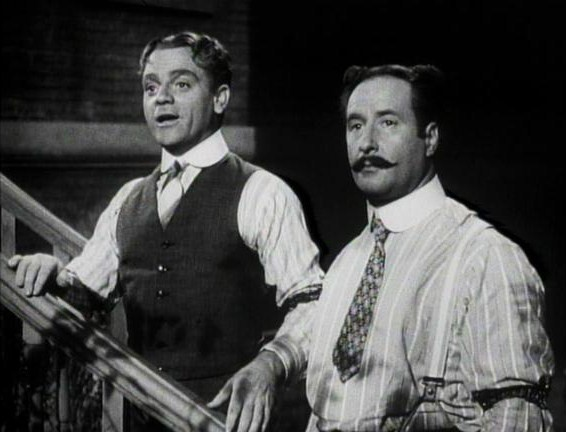
Tobias (right) with James Cagney (left) in Warner Bros. 1941 film The Strawberry Blonde.

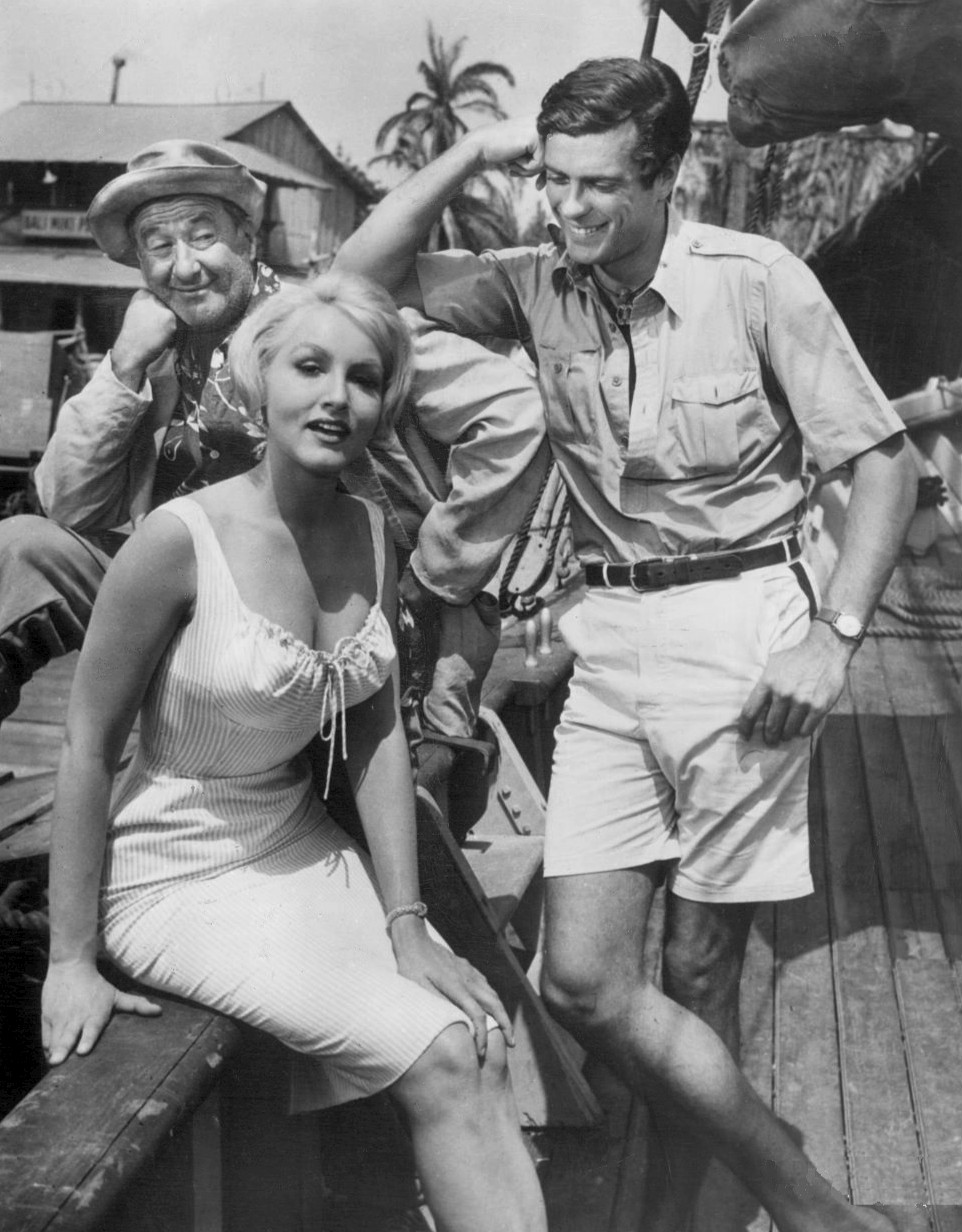
On set of ABC TV series Adventures in Paradise (1960), L–R: Tobias, Julie Newmar & Gardner McKay

Tobias began acting at age 15, at New York's Neighborhood Playhouse. He appeared in Eugene O'Neill's The Hairy Ape in 1922, and in Charles Méré's La Flamme and Channing Pollock's The Fool the following year, then made his Broadway debut in Maxwell Anderson's What Price Glory? in 1924.

In 1939, he signed with Warner Bros. and was cast in supporting roles, many times along with James Cagney, such as the musical Yankee Doodle Dandy (1942), and with Gary Cooper in the drama Sergeant York (1941) and Irving Berlin, Ronald Reagan, and George Murphy in This Is the Army (1943). In 1950, he was cast as a ruthless killer and felon in the film noir Southside 1-1000.

During the 1959 television season, Tobias was a regular on Hudson's Bay, playing Pierre Falcon.

Tobias portrayed Penrose in eight episodes of Adventures in Paradise (1959–1961). From 1964 to 1971, he played Abner Kravitz, the long-suffering neighbor on the ABC sitcom Bewitched. Tobias often appeared in an uncredited role as a courtroom spectator on Perry Mason, and he played Sidney Falconer in the episode titled "The Case of the Antic Angel" (1964).

In 1972-1973, Tobias appeared in an episode of The Waltons as junkman Vernon Rutley.

Tobias never married and he retired from acting in 1977 after he reprised his role as Abner Kravitz in a guest appearance on the Bewitched sequel Tabitha.

== Personal life and death ==
On February 27, 1980, Tobias died of bladder cancer at age 78 at Cedars Sinai Medical Center in Los Angeles. En route to the mortuary, the momentarily unattended station wagon transporting Tobias's body from the hospital was hijacked and driven three blocks before the thieves noticed the body, promptly abandoned the vehicle and—according to witnesses—"ran screaming" from the scene. The memorial service for Tobias took place as planned on February 29, 1980, at Mount Sinai Memorial Park. Tobias is buried at Mt. Carmel Cemetery #1 in Glendale, Queens, New York City.

== Work ==
=== Theater ===
Broadway productions:

- What Price Glory? (1924)
- The International (1928)
- The Road to Rome (1928)
- The Grey Fox (1928)
- Red Dust (1928)
- S. S. Glencairn (1929)
- Fiesta (1929)
- Sailors of Cattaro (1934)
- Black Pit (1935)
- Paths of Glory (1935)
- Hell Freezes Over (1935)
- Star Spangled (1936)
- You Can't Take It with You (1936)
- Good Hunting (1938)
- Silk Stockings (1955)

=== Complete filmography ===
- The Lunatic (1927)
- Yes, My Darling Daughter (1939) as Dock Worker (uncredited)
- Maisie (1939) as Rico
- They All Come Out (1939) as "Sloppy Joe"
- The Roaring Twenties (1939) as Soldier in American Army Barracks (uncredited)
- Ninotchka (1939) as Soviet Visa Official (uncredited)
- Balalaika (1939) as Slaski
- The Hunchback of Notre Dame (1939) as Beggar
- Music in My Heart (1940) as Sascha
- Saturday's Children (1940) as Herbert Smith
- Torrid Zone (1940) as Rosie La Mata
- The Man Who Talked Too Much (1940) as Slug "Canvasback" McNutt
- They Drive by Night (1940) as George Rondolos
- River's End (1940) as Andrew "Andy" Dijon
- The Baron and the Rose (1940, Short) as Henry Stiegel
- Calling All Husbands (1940) as Oscar Armstrong
- City for Conquest (1940) as Pinky
- East of the River (1940) as Tony Scaduto
- South of Suez (1940) as Eli Snedeker
- The Strawberry Blonde (1941) as Nicholas Pappalas
- Affectionately Yours (1941) as Pasha
- Out of the Fog (1941) as Igor Propotkin
- Sergeant York (1941) as Private Michael T. "Pusher" Ross
- The Bride Came C.O.D. (1941) as Peewee Defoe
- The Tanks Are Coming (1941, Short) as Malowski
- Captains of the Clouds (1942) as Blimp Lebec (bush pilot)
- Yankee Doodle Dandy (1942) as Dietz
- Juke Girl (1942) as Nick Garcos
- Wings for the Eagle (1942) as Jake Hanso
- My Sister Eileen (1942) as Appopolous
- Air Force (1943) as Asst. Crew Chief Weinberg
- Mission to Moscow (1943) as Freddie
- This Is the Army (1943) as Maxie Twardofsky
- Thank Your Lucky Stars (1943) as himself
- Passage to Marseille (1944) as Petit
- Between Two Worlds (1944) as Pete Musick
- Make Your Own Bed (1944) as Boris Fenilise
- Objective, Burma! (1945) as Cpl. Gabby Gordon
- Mildred Pierce (1945) as Mr. Chris (uncredited)
- Her Kind of Man (1946) as Joe Marino
- Nobody Lives Forever (1946) as Al Doyle
- Gallant Bess (1946) as Lug Johnson
- Sinbad the Sailor (1947) as Abbu
- My Wild Irish Rose (1947) as Nick Popoli
- The Judge Steps Out (1948) as Mike
- Adventures of Casanova (1948) as Jacopo
- The Set-Up (1949) as Tiny
- Everybody Does It (1949) as Rossi
- Southside 1-1000 (1950) as Reggie
- Rawhide (1951) as Gratz
- The Mark of the Renegade (1951) as Captain Bardoso
- The Magic Carpet (1951) as Razi
- Ten Tall Men (1951) as Londos
- Desert Pursuit (1952) as Ghazili
- The Glenn Miller Story (1954) as Si Schribman
- The Seven Little Foys (1954) as Barney Green
- The Tattered Dress (1957) as Billy Giles
- Silk Stockings (1957) as Vassili Markovitch
- Marjorie Morningstar (1958) as Maxwell Greech
- Hudson's Bay (1959-1960) as series regular Pierre Falcon
- A New Kind of Love (1963) as Joe Bergner
- Perry Mason (1964) as Sidney Falconer
- Bullet for a Badman (1964) as Diggs
- Nightmare in the Sun (1965) as Gideon
- The Glass Bottom Boat (1966) as Mr. Fenimore
- The Phynx (1970) as Markevitch
- Tora! Tora! Tora! (1970) as Captain on Flight Line at Hickam Field (uncredited)
