= Appointment in Honduras =

1953 film by Jacques Tourneur

- Theatrical release poster
- Directed by: Jacques Tourneur
- Written by: Mario Silvera; Jack Cornall; Karen DeWolf
- Produced by: Benedict Bogeaus
- Starring: Glenn Ford; Ann Sheridan; Zachary Scott
- Distributed by: RKO
- Release date: October 16, 1953 (US)
- Running time: 77 minutes
- Country: United States
- Language: English
- Box office: $1.15 million

Appointment in Honduras is a 1953 American adventure film directed by Jacques Tourneur and starring Glenn Ford, Ann Sheridan, and Zachary Scott.

== Plot ==
Taking place in 1910, during a fictional revolution in Honduras, Jim Corbett (Glenn Ford) was hired to ensure that a large sum of money came to the deposed political leader. Sylvia Sheppard (Ann Sheridan) and her wealthy husband Harry Sheppard (Zachary Scott) are unwilling hostages of Corbett, who is accompanied through the jungle by several wanted criminals. Sylvia, ever the unfaithful wife, eventually falls in love with Corbett. They encounter various dangers, including crocodiles, "tiger fish," large snakes, biting ants, a huge swarm of some unnamed, assumed stinging insects, malaria, and armed insurgents.

== Cast ==
Actor	Role
Glenn Ford	Jim
Ann Sheridan	Sylvia
Zachary Scott	Harry
Jack Elam	Castro
Rodolfo Acosta	Reyes
Stanley Andrews	Captain McTaggart
