= Nina Moise =

American actress, director

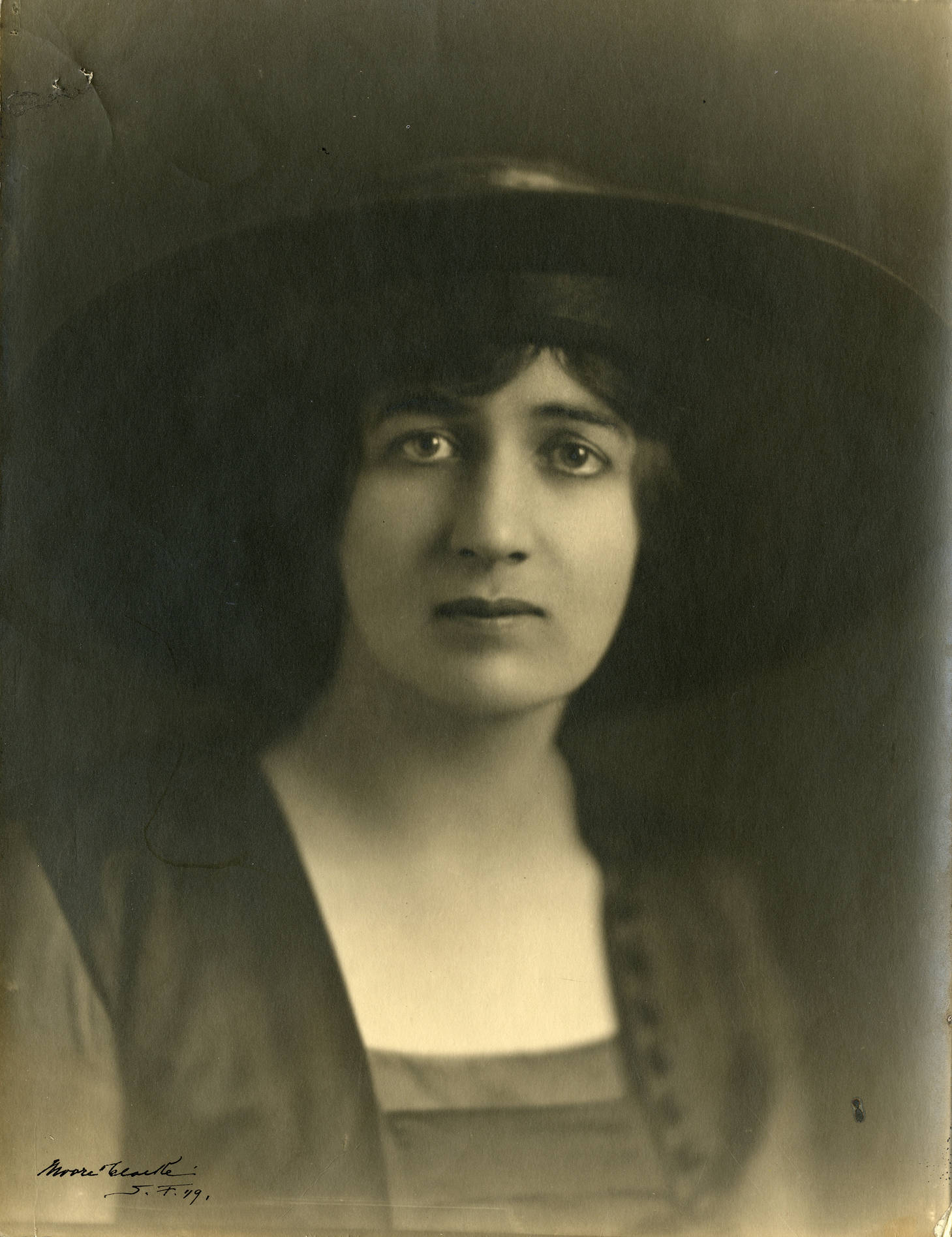
- Nina Moise, in 1919.
- Born: Nina Ethel Moise; July 15, 1890; San Francisco, California
- Died: December 14, 1968 (aged 78); Los Angeles, California
- Occupation(s): Actress, director

Nina Moise (July 15, 1890 – December 14, 1968) was an American actress, vocal coach, and theatrical and film director.

== Early life and education ==
Nina Ethel Moise was from San Francisco, the daughter of Philip Henry Moise and Emma Moise. She had older sisters Clarice and Hazel. Clarice married British explorer and author Arthur de Carle Sowerby in Shanghai in 1925, and was managing editor of The China Journal.

Nina Moise graduated from Girls' High School in 1908, and like her sisters attended Stanford University, where she was president of the Associated Women Students, and ran for editor of the school's literary monthly, the Sequoia. In 1911, she became the first woman student to address the Stanford student body. She graduated from Stanford in 1912.

== Career ==
=== Theatre ===
Moise was an actress who became a theatrical and film director. She was both an actress and director with the Jessie Bonstelle company in Detroit. In 1914, she gave a dramatic reading for the Ebell Club in Los Angeles. In 1917 she was named the first professional director of the Provincetown Players. "Tactful handling of temperaments on Nina's part pulled the whole bill through to success," recalled Edna Kenton. She directed seventeen productions, collaborating with playwrights Floyd Dell, Eugene O'Neill, Neith Boyce, and Susan Glaspell, among others, before she left the Provincetown Players in May 1918. Later in 1918, during World War I, she was head of the educational department of the San Francisco chapter of the American Red Cross.

In 1921, Moise began as company director of the Santa Barbara Community Arts Players. At Santa Barbara, she directed plays performed at the Lobero Theatre, and actors including Eva Le Gallienne. She also appeared on stage, including in the starring role in Within the Law in 1922, when the scheduled star fell ill. In 1922, she took a six-month leave to study developments in theatre in Europe. In 1924, she spoke at the annual meeting of the Drama League of America, on a panel titled "The Non-Professional Theatre". She left the Santa Barbara Players in 1926, succeeded by Irving Pichel.

=== Film ===
Moise became known as a film director in 1933. She told a newspaper that year, "I don't want to be hard-boiled, but it would be convenient right now if I could be." Her film credits included work as assistant to Cecil B. DeMille on This Day and Age (1933), as associate director on Cradle Song (1933), and as a dialogue coach on My Marriage (1936), High Noon (1952), and The Girl in the Red Velvet Swing (1955). She helped performers including Buster Crabbe, Akim Tamiroff, Simone Simon, and Claire Trevor improve their voices or change accents. She also coached the voice actors on Disney films including Snow White (1937) and Pinocchio (1940).

== Personal life ==
Moise may have had a personal relationship with Eugene O'Neill. In 1934 and 1935 she traveled to Shanghai. She died in 1968, aged 78, in Los Angeles, California.
