= The Tanks Are Coming (1941 film) =

1941 film

- Directed by: B. Reeves Eason
- Written by: Owen Crump
- Produced by: Gordon Hollingshead
- Starring: George Tobias; Richard Travis; Gig Young
- Narrated by: Knox Manning
- Cinematography: Bert Glennon
- Edited by: Everett Dodd
- Music by: William Lava; Howard Jackson
- Distributed by: Warner Bros.
- Release date: 1941
- Running time: 20 minutes
- Country: United States
- Language: English

The Tanks Are Coming is a 1941 American Technicolor short film directed by B. Reeves Eason and written by Owen Crump. It is primarily a recruitment film, but can also be regarded as a propaganda film or a documentary with some light relief. Like Dive Bomber (of the same year) it is a pre-Pearl Harbor film, made with the co-operation of the relevant branch of the US armed forces, showing off US military material to the US public, in lavish Technicolor. This material is shown in motion, both on the road and in the field; training equipment and methods are also featured.

It was nominated for an Academy Award at the 14th Academy Awards for Best Short Subject (Two-Reel).

== Plot ==
New York taxicab driver Malowski (George Tobias) enlists in the "First Armored Force", bringing his beloved taxi cab "Betsy" with him. He participates in large-scale mechanized maneuvers, during which the taxi is run over and crushed. The tanks featured in the short were the U.S Army's M2A4 light tank and the M2A1 medium tank.

== Cast ==
- George Tobias as Malowski
- Richard Travis as Pete
- Gig Young as Jim Allen
- Frank Wilcox as Colonel

A young Richard Egan appears uncredited in a few scenes and has a few lines. He enlisted in the Army in 1942 and achieved the rank of captain. He started his actual film career in 1949.
