= Here Comes the Cavalry =

1941 film

Here Comes the Cavalry is a 1941 American short Western film directed by D. Ross Lederman and starring Richard Travis, Ralph Byrd, Garry Owen, and Casey Johnson.
