= So This Is London =

So This Is London may refer to:

- So This Is London (play), by Arthur Goodrich
- So This Is London (1930 film), an American film
- So This Is London (1939 film), a British film

== See also ==
- This Is London (disambiguation)
