= London Calling (disambiguation) =

London Calling is a 1979 album by The Clash, and its title track.

London Calling may also refer to:

- "This is London Calling", the opening of BBC World Service broadcasts to occupied Europe during WWII
- "Ici Londres!" ("London calling!"), opening of Radio Londres broadcasts to Nazi-occupied France

== Film, television, and stage ==
- London Calling (play), by Geoffrey Kerr, 1930
- "London Calling", a 2008 episode of Instant Star
- London Calling, a 2009 film by director Babbar Subhash
- "London Calling" (Ugly Betty), a 2010 episode of the TV series
- London Calling, a 2012 BBC music documentary series presented by Jools Holland
- London Calling (film), a 2025 film by director Allan Ungar

== Literature ==
- London Calling (magazine), later renamed BBC Worldwide, then BBC On Air
- London Calling (Bloor novel), by Edward Bloor, 2006
- London Calling (Craig novel), by James Craig, 2011
- London Calling (Sheridan novel), by Sara Sheridan, 2013
- Tracer - London Calling, a 2020 Overwatch comic limited series

== Music ==
- London Calling (festival), a music festival in Amsterdam
- London Calling! (musical), a 1923 musical revue by Noël Coward
- "London Calling" (song), by The Clash, 1979
- London Calling, a 2009 album by Babutsa
- London Calling: Live in Hyde Park, a 2010 concert video by Bruce Springsteen and the E Street Band

== See also ==
- "London's Burning", another song by The Clash, 1977
- This Is London (disambiguation)
- London Falling, a comic strip
