= Granville Bates =

American actor (1882–1940)

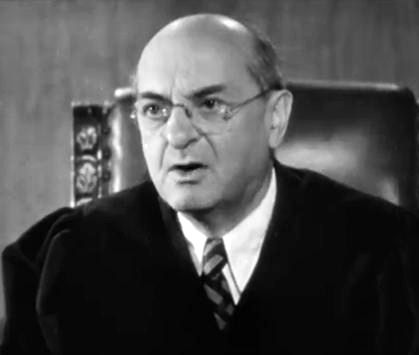
- Bates in My Favorite Wife (1940)
- Born: January 7, 1882; Chicago, Illinois, U.S.
- Died: July 8, 1940 (aged 58); Hollywood, California, U.S.
- Resting place: Graceland Cemetery, Chicago, Illinois
- Occupation: Actor
- Years active: 1917–1940
- Spouses: Pearl Dowell (m. 1913; div. 1919); Josephine Weller (m. 1930)

Granville Bates (January 7, 1882 – July 8, 1940) was an American character actor and bit player, appearing in over ninety films.

== Biography ==
Bates was born in Chicago in 1882 to Granville Bates, Sr., a developer and builder, and Adaline Bates (née Gleason). He grew up in the Lakeview neighborhood of Chicago on the southeast corner of Evanston (now Broadway) Ave. and Oakdale Ave. in a townhouse that his father later demolished, along with all of the others on the block, to redevelop as a four-story commercial building with apartments above.

Bates began his film career in the 1910s with Essanay Studios of the Chicago film industry, and his World War I draft Registration Card listed him as a travelling actor for Francis Owen & Co. He appeared on Broadway in the late 1920s and early 1930s, notably in the original production of Merrily We Roll Along (1934) by George S. Kaufman and Moss Hart. He was also the Conductor in the original production of Twentieth Century (1932).

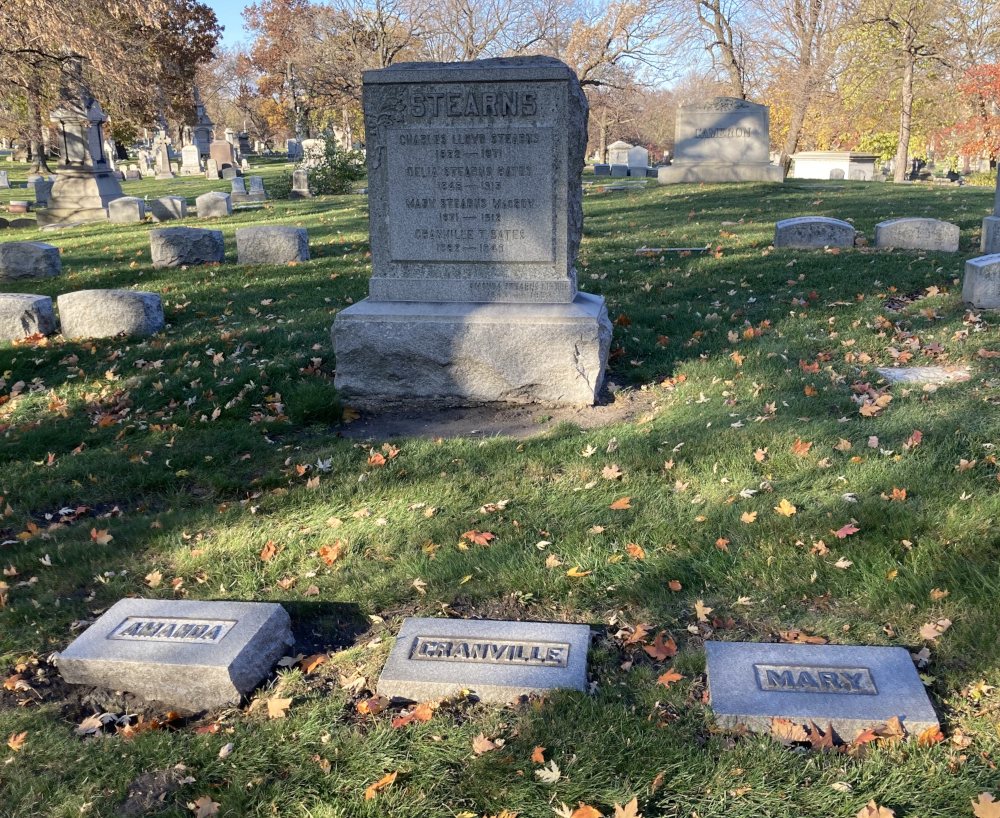
Bates' grave at Graceland Cemetery

From the 1930s, he appeared in a number of classic films, although sometimes uncredited. He received favorable notice for his character roles, such as in My Favorite Wife (1940), where he played an irascible judge – The New York Times critic Bosley Crowther wrote "Mr. Bates deserves a separate mention for his masterpiece of comic creation." Another New York Times reviewer noted that "Edward Ellis and Granville Bates provoked an early audience yesterday to gentle laughter in a brief but quietly amusing sequence" in Chatterbox (1936), while Crowther praised his work in Men Against the Sky (1940): "The players' performances are stock and pedestrian, excepting that of Granville Bates as a cynical banker".

Bates died of a heart attack in Hollywood on July 9, 1940. He was buried at Graceland Cemetery in Chicago.

== Select stage credits ==
Run	Title	Character	Playwright(s)	Theater/Location
Nov 12, 1924 - Jan 1925	Silence	Dr. Thorpe	Max Marcin	List: - National Theatre (Nederlander Theatre); - New York, NY
Oct 06, 1927 - Oct 22, 1927	My Princess	Mitchell	Edward Sheldon and Dorothy Donnelly	List: - Shubert Theatre; - New York, NY
Nov 07, 1927 - Nov 1927	The Stairs	Gianfranchi	Rosso di San Secondo	List: - Bijoy Theatre (Demolished 1982); - New York, NY
Aug 27, 1928 - Dec 1928	Gentlemen of the Press	Braddock	Ward Morehouse	List: - Henry Miller's Theatre (Stephen Sondheim Theatre); - New York, NY
Jan 08, 1930 - Jan 1930	So Was Napoleon (Sap from Syracuse)	Solomon Hycross	Jack O'Donnell and John Wray	List: - Sam H. Harris Theatre (demolished 1996); - New York, NY
Sep 24, 1930 - Sep 05, 1931	Once in a Lifetime	Bishop (replacement)	Moss Hart and George S. Kaufman	List: - Music Box Theatre/Plymouth Theatre (Music Box Theatre); - New York, NY
Feb 18, 1932 - Apr 1932	Trick for Trick	Lieutenant Jed Dodson	Vivian Crosby, Shirley Warde and Harry Wagstaff Gribble	List: - Sam H. Harris Theatre; - New York, NY
Sep 19, 1932 - Oct 1932	Lilly Turner	Dave Turner	George Abbott and Philip Dunning	List: - Morosco Theatre (demolished 1982); - New York, NY
Dec 29, 1932 - May 20, 1933	Twentieth Century	Conductor	Ben Hecht and Charles MacArthur; Based on a play by Charles Bruce Millholland	List: - Broadhurst Theatre; - New York, NY
Sep 21, 1933 - Jan 1934	Double Door	Mortimer Neff	Elizabeth McFadden	List: - Ritz Theatre (Walter Kerr Theatre); - New York, NY
May 15, 1934 - Jun 02, 1934	Come What May	Dr. Hughes	Richard F. Flournoy	List: - Plymouth Theatre (Gerald Schoenfeld Theatre); - New York, NY
Sep 29, 1934 - Feb 1935	Merrily We Roll Along	Mr. Murney	George S. Kaufman and Moss Hart	List: - Music Box Theatre; - New York, NY
Feb 12, 1935 - Mar 1935	Rain	Joe Horn	John Colton and Clemence Randolph; from a story by W. Somerset Maugham	List: - Music Box Theatre; - New York, NY

== Filmography ==
- Young Mother Hubbard (1917) - James
- The Kill-Joy (1917) - The Crab
- Jealousy (1929) - Lawyer
- The Sap from Syracuse (1930) - Nycross
- Honor Among Lovers (1931) - Clark
- The Smiling Lieutenant (1931) - Bill Collector (uncredited)
- The Wiser Sex (1932) - City Editor
- Midnight (1934) - Henry McGrath
- Woman in the Dark (1934) - Sheriff Grant
- Woman Wanted (1935) - Casey (scenes deleted)
- Pursuit (1935) - Auto Camp Proprietor
- O'Shaughnessy's Boy (1935) - Doctor
- I Live My Life (1935) - Yacht Captain (uncredited)
- Chatterbox (1936) - Philip Greene Sr
- Here Comes Trouble (1936)
- The Music Goes 'Round (1936) - Political Speaker (uncredited)
- 13 Hours by Air (1936) - Pop Andrews
- Times Square Playboy (1936) - Mr. Mort Calhoun
- Hearts Divided (1936) - Robert Livingston (uncredited)
- Poppy (1936) - Mayor Farnsworth
- The Captain's Kid (1936) - Sheriff Pengast
- The Plainsman (1936) - Van Ellyn
- Sing Me a Love Song (1936) - Mr. Goodrich (uncredited)
- Beloved Enemy (1936) - Ryan
- Larceny on the Air (1937) - Prof. Rexford Sterling
- Breezing Home (1937) - Head Politician (uncredited)
- Green Light (1937) - Sheriff
- The Great O'Malley (1937) - Jake - Bar Proprietor (uncredited)
- When's Your Birthday? (1937) - Judge O'Day
- Nancy Steele Is Missing! (1937) - Joseph F.X. Flaherty
- Waikiki Wedding (1937) - Uncle Herman
- Let's Get Married (1937) - Hank Keith
- The Good Old Soak (1937) - Sam (uncredited)
- Mountain Justice (1937) - Judge Crawley at Jeff's Trial
- Make Way for Tomorrow (1937) - Mr. Hunter (uncredited)
- Wings over Honolulu (1937) - Grocery Clerk (uncredited)
- They Won't Forget (1937) - Detective Pindar
- It Happened in Hollywood (1937) - Sam Bennett
- Back in Circulation (1937) - Dr. Evans
- The Perfect Specimen (1937) - Hooker - Garage Owner
- Under Suspicion (1937) - K.Y. Mitchell
- Mannequin (1937) - Mr. Gebhart (uncredited)
- Wells Fargo (1937) - Bradford - Banker
- The Buccaneer (1938) - Gentleman Wanting to Surrender (uncredited)
- The Jury's Secret (1938) - Judge Pendegast
- Gold Is Where You Find It (1938) - Nixon (scenes deleted)
- The Adventures of Marco Polo (1938) - Venetian Business Man (uncredited)
- Go Chase Yourself (1938) - Halliday
- Romance on the Run (1938) - Phelps
- Cowboy from Brooklyn (1938) - Pop Hardy
- Mr. Chump (1938) - Abner Sprague
- The Affairs of Annabel (1938) - Mr. Fletcher
- Youth Takes a Fling (1938) - Mr. Judd
- Garden of the Moon (1938) - Angus McGillicuddy
- A Man to Remember (1938) - George Sykes
- Young Dr. Kildare (1938) - Harry Cook (uncredited)
- The Sisters (1938) - Taft Election Announcer (uncredited)
- Hard to Get (1938) - Judge Harkness
- The Shining Hour (1938) - Second Man on Plane (uncredited)
- Next Time I Marry (1938) - H.E. Crocker
- The Great Man Votes (1939) - The Mayor
- Blackwell's Island (1939) - Prison Warden Stuart 'Stu' Granger
- Twelve Crowded Hours (1939) - James McEwen
- Sweepstakes Winner (1939) - Pop Reynolds
- Naughty but Nice (1939) - Judge Kennith B. Walters, Superior Court
- At the Circus (1939) - (uncredited)
- Indianapolis Speedway (1939) - Mr. Greer
- Espionage Agent (1939) - Phineas T. O'Grady
- Fast and Furious (1939) - Chief Miller
- Pride of the Blue Grass (1939) - Col. Bob Griner
- Eternally Yours (1939) - Ship Captain (uncredited)
- Our Neighbors – The Carters (1939) - Joseph Laurence
- Charlie McCarthy, Detective (1939) - Judge Black (uncredited)
- Of Mice and Men (1939) - Carlson
- Thou Shalt Not Kill (1939) - Mr. Miller
- Internationally Yours (1939)
- Brother Rat and a Baby (1940) - First Doctor (uncredited)
- Granny Get Your Gun (1940) - Tom Redding
- Millionaire Playboy (1940) - Stafford
- My Favorite Wife (1940) - Judge Bryson
- Brother Orchid (1940) - Pattonsville Superintendent
- The Mortal Storm (1940) - Professor Berg
- Anne of Windy Poplars (1940) - Dr. Walton (uncredited)
- Private Affairs (1940) - Judge Samuel Elmer Hamilton
- Flowing Gold (1940) - Charles Hammond / Shylock
- Men Against the Sky (1940) - Mr. Burdett (final film role)
