= First Lady (play) =

1935 American play

- Original language: English
- Written by: Katharine Dayton and George S. Kaufman
- Subject: Competition between political wives
- Genre: Satire
- Setting: Living room of Secretary of State's house; Judge Hibbard's Study; Secretary of State's home

Premiere
- Date: November 26, 1935
- Place: Music Box Theatre
- Directed by: George S. Kaufman

First Lady is a 1935 play written by Katharine Dayton and George S. Kaufman. It is a three-act comedy, with three settings and a large cast. There are four scenes, which occur at monthly intervals starting with the December prior to a presidential election year. The story concerns a Washington, D.C. socialite who almost lets her rivalry with another social maven impede her husband's political future. The title is a play on the usual term accorded to a president's wife, suggesting it really belongs to the leading society hostess in the capitol.

It was first produced by Sam H. Harris, staged by George S. Kaufman, with sets by Donald Oenslager, costumes by John Hambleton, and starred Jane Cowl. It ran on Broadway from November 1935 through June 1936. It was third on the Best Plays of the Season list by Burns Mantle of the New York Daily News. The play was adapted for a film of the same name in 1937, and was revived for a limited engagement on Broadway during 1952.

== Characters ==
For clarity, only the principal speaking parts are listed; some featured roles and walk-ons are omitted.

Lead

- Lucy Chase Wayne is a prominent social hostess in Washington, born and raised in the White House. (Note: Contemporary reviewers of the play were inconsistent about whether the character's father or grandfather had been president.)
- Sophy Prescott is Lucy's smooth, competent social secretary and confidant.
- Stephen Wayne is the secretary of state, a potential presidential candidate and Lucy's husband.
- Irene Hibbard is a much-married socialite, a bottle blonde from Ohio with a veneer of European education.

Supporting

- Emmy Paige is Lucy's young Southern niece.
- Belle Hardwick is the blunt wife of an older senator, who helps out at Lucy's reception.
- Mrs. Creevey is an exuberant "club-woman", who heads up the Women's Peace and Purity League.
- Senator Keane is an ambitious young western senator who has caught Irene's eye.
- Carter Hibbard is Irene's much older husband, a Supreme Court justice, who loves comic strips.
- Ellsworth T. Ganning is the owner of a chain of newspapers. (Note: The name suggests an association with Frank Ernest Gannett.)

Featured

- Charles is the butler in the Wayne household.
- Mrs. Ives called Mary, is a "tea-pourer" at Lucy's reception.
- Ann Forester is the attractive wife of a State department employee, an unofficial aide to Lucy.
- Tom Hardwick is a wise older senator, married to Belle. (Note: Through a program printing error, the character's surname appeared in reviews as "Hartwick".)
- Bleecker is the butler in the Hibbard household.
- George Mason is a judge who supports the Hibbard campaign scheme.
- Jason Fleming is a young employee of the State department, keen on Emmy.

== Synopsis ==
Lucy Chase Wayne, wife of the secretary of state, who exemplifies the pedigreed Washington hostess, is incensed with the upstart Irene Hibbard, wife of a Supreme Court justice. Irene has stolen away Lucy's cook, an unforgivable social transgression. It is doubly mortifying, for though Irene is only the daughter of a Midwest auto seller, she has acquired a sophisticated image from her European education and a brief prior marriage to a "Slovanian" prince. (Note: This is meant to be a fictional country, like Ruritania, with an unfortunate but coincidental likeness to Slovenia.) Furthermore, Lucy learns that Irene is contemplating divorce from her elderly and dyspeptic husband Carter, whose only interests are fishing, comic strips, and radio programs. Irene is ambitious to become First Lady, and has chosen for her vehicle a personable young senator Keane from the Western United States.

To thwart Irene, Lucy creates a rumor that Carter is highly thought of for his party's nomination. She spreads it by flattering Mrs. Creevey and Ellsworth T. Ganning with her "confidences". Her reasoning is that the rumors will force Irene to stick with Carter, whose age and unambitious nature is unlikely to excite a nominating committee. However, as the months go by she finds that a groundswell of popular opinion, now propelled by Irene, is floating Carter Hibbard's candidacy. Senator Hardwick remonstrates with Lucy, because the party elders had been contemplating her own husband Stephen Wayne for the nomination. Aghast, Lucy tries to find a way to stymie Irene's campaign. It comes from an unexpected source, Jason Fleming, a State department expert on the Balkans, who is dating her niece Emmy. Lucy learns that a treaty between the US and Slovania was never ratified, so the divorce Irene obtained in that country is not recognized in the states. Lucy uses her knowledge to pressure Irene into backing down, allowing Stephen's candidacy to gain momentum.

== Original production ==
=== Background ===
Katharine Dayton was a Washington newspaper correspondent and writer of political satire for the Saturday Evening Post. A literary agent suggested she write a play about Washington's social scene, and arranged for her to meet George S. Kaufman in 1933. However, it wasn't until 1935 that they actually started writing. Two acts were finished by April 8, 1935, and the rest completed by April 27, 1935. According to the New York Daily News, Kaufman and Dayton between them contributed one quarter of the show's initial funding.

Some columnists and critics assumed the author's main inspiration for Lucy Chase Wayne, and perhaps a source for the play, was Alice Roosevelt Longworth. Another suggestion was that Irene Hibbard was based on a more obscure Washington social figure named Dolly Gann. However, then real First Lady, Eleanor Roosevelt, upon seeing the play, told reporters "I think the authors picked out amusing incidents without stressing personalities".

Producer Sam H. Harris and the authors originally wanted Ina Claire for the main role of Lucy Chase Wayne, but she signed a three-year exclusive contract with the Theatre Guild in July 1935. Jane Cowl and Ruth Chatterton were next considered, but it took a while to get the former to agree. The negotiations coupled with Kaufman's delay in Hollywood for a Marx Brothers picture meant the Broadway premiere was pushed back from September 1935.

Rehearsals began October 14, 1935. Ann Andrews was originally cast for the second female lead (Irene Hibbard), but after the second week of rehearsals was replaced by Lily Cahill. Casting was complete and the tryout venue settled by October 27, 1935.

=== Cast ===
Principal cast for the tryout in Philadelphia and during the original Broadway run.
Role	Actor	Dates	Notes and sources
Sophy Prescott	Diantha Pattison	Nov 11, 1935 - Jun 20, 1936	
Lucy Chase Wayne	Jane Cowl	Nov 11, 1935 - Jun 20, 1936	
Stephen Wayne	Stanley Ridges	Nov 11, 1935 - Jun 13, 1936	
Stephen Wayne	Roy Gordon	Jun 15, 1936 - Jun 20, 1936	
Irene Hibbard	Lily Cahill	Nov 11, 1935 - Jun 13, 1936	
Irene Hibbard	Ann Mason	Jun 15, 1935 - Jun 20, 1936	Mason replaced Cahill for the last week of the Broadway run and the tour during Fall 1936.
Emmy Paige	Helen Brooks	Nov 11, 1935 - Jun 20, 1936	
Belle Hardwick	Jessie Busley	Nov 11, 1935 - Jun 13, 1936	
Belle Hardwick	Mary Cecil	Jun 15, 1936 - Jun 20, 1936	
Mrs. Creveey	Ethel Wilson	Nov 11, 1935 - Jun 20, 1936	
Senator Keane	Judson Laire	Nov 11, 1935 - Jun 20, 1936	
Carter Hibbard	Oswald Yorke	Nov 11, 1935 - Jun 20, 1936	
Ellsworth T. Ganning	Florenz Ames	Nov 11, 1935 - Jun 20, 1936	
Charles	James Seeley	Nov 11, 1935 - Jun 20, 1936	
Mrs. Ives	Regina Wallace	Nov 11, 1935 - Jun 13, 1936	She took over the Irene Hibbard role temporarily when Lily Cahill fell ill in April 1936.
Mrs. Ives	Judith Vosselli	Jun 15, 1936 - Jun 20, 1936	
Ann Forester	Rita Vale	Nov 11, 1935 - Jun 13, 1936	
Ann Forester	Marjorie Crossland	Jun 15, 1936 - Jun 20, 1936	
Tom Hardwick	Thomas Findlay	Nov 11, 1935 - Jun 20, 1936	
Bleecker	John M. Troughton	Nov 11, 1935 - Jun 13, 1936	
Bleecker	James Francis Robertson	Jun 15, 1936 - Jun 20, 1936	
George Mason	Frank Dae	Nov 11, 1935 - Jun 20, 1936	
Jason Fleming	Don Beddoe	Nov 11, 1935 - Jun 20, 1936	

=== Tryout ===
First Lady had a two-week tryout at the Garrick Theatre in Philadelphia starting November 11, 1935. The local reviewer found no weaknesses in the play and pronounced it a sure hit.

=== Premiere and reception ===
The Broadway premiere for First Lady occurred November 26, 1935 at the Music Box Theatre. Rowland Field of the Brooklyn Times Union said it was "a top hat and white ties affair", and he personally saw Tallulah Bankhead, John Golden, Arthur Hopkins, Max Gordon, Harpo Marx, Irving Berlin, Adolph Zukor, Moss Hart, Brock Pemberton, Ira Gershwin, Louis Calhern, Marion Davies, and Pat O'Brien among other celebrities in attendance. Jane Cowl had top billing in advertising, with her name the same size as the title, and no other performers listed.

Brooks Atkinson of The New York Times focused his positive review on Jane Cowl's performance: "What Miss Cowl has brought to the comedy by way of personal beauty, impeccability of manners, humorous vitality and simple command of the art of acting is of inestimable value to the pleasure of the evening". Atkinson was also complimentary to the staging, scenery, writing, and the other actors, but his paramount praise was for "one of our first ladies of the stage". Arthur Pollock in the Brooklyn Daily Eagle was more balanced in his accolades between Jane Cowl and Lily Cahill as the rivals. He pronounced First Lady as "something light, a little thing of jokes and intrigues", "pure unadulterated wit" and "nifty satire". Rowland Field in the Brooklyn Times Union thought the play was the "season's best comedy", while Burns Mantle in the New York Daily News recognized Lily Cahill had the more difficult role, requiring a certain amount of overplaying to match the advantages of Jane Cowl's character.

=== Closing ===
During the show's last week on Broadway the producer replaced six of the principal players with performers who would be with the touring company later that year. First Lady closed at the Music Box Theatre on June 20, 1936, after 245 performances. (Note: The count includes 237 from the cited reference plus 8 performances from the final week.)
