= Trick for Trick (film) =

1933 film by Hamilton MacFadden

- Directed by: Hamilton MacFadden
- Screenplay by: Howard J. Green
- Story by: Vivian Crosby; Harry Wagstaff Gribble; Shirley Warde
- Starring: Ralph Morgan; Victor Jory; Sally Blane; Tom Dugan; Luis Alberni; Edward Van Sloan
- Cinematography: L. William O'Connell
- Edited by: Robert Bischoff
- Music by: R.H. Bassett
- Production company: Fox Film Corporation
- Distributed by: Fox Film Corporation
- Release date: April 21, 1933
- Running time: 67 minutes
- Country: United States
- Language: English

Trick for Trick is a 1933 American pre-Code mystery film directed by Hamilton MacFadden, written by Howard J. Green, and starring Ralph Morgan, Victor Jory, Sally Blane, Tom Dugan, Luis Alberni and Edward Van Sloan. It was released on April 21, 1933, by Fox Film Corporation.

== Plot ==
Police investigate when the assistant of the magician Azrah is found dead in a river, but he manages at first to evade any responsibility for the incident.

== Cast ==
- Ralph Morgan as Azrah
- Victor Jory as La Tour
- Sally Blane as Constance Russell
- Tom Dugan as Albert Young
- Luis Alberni as Metzger
- Edward Van Sloan as John Russell
- Willard Robertson as Dr. Frank Fitzgerald
- Dorothy Appleby as Maisie Henry
- Boothe Howard as Detective Lt. Jed Dobson
- Phillip Trent as David Adams
- Adrian Morris as Boldy
