= Helen Mack =

American actress

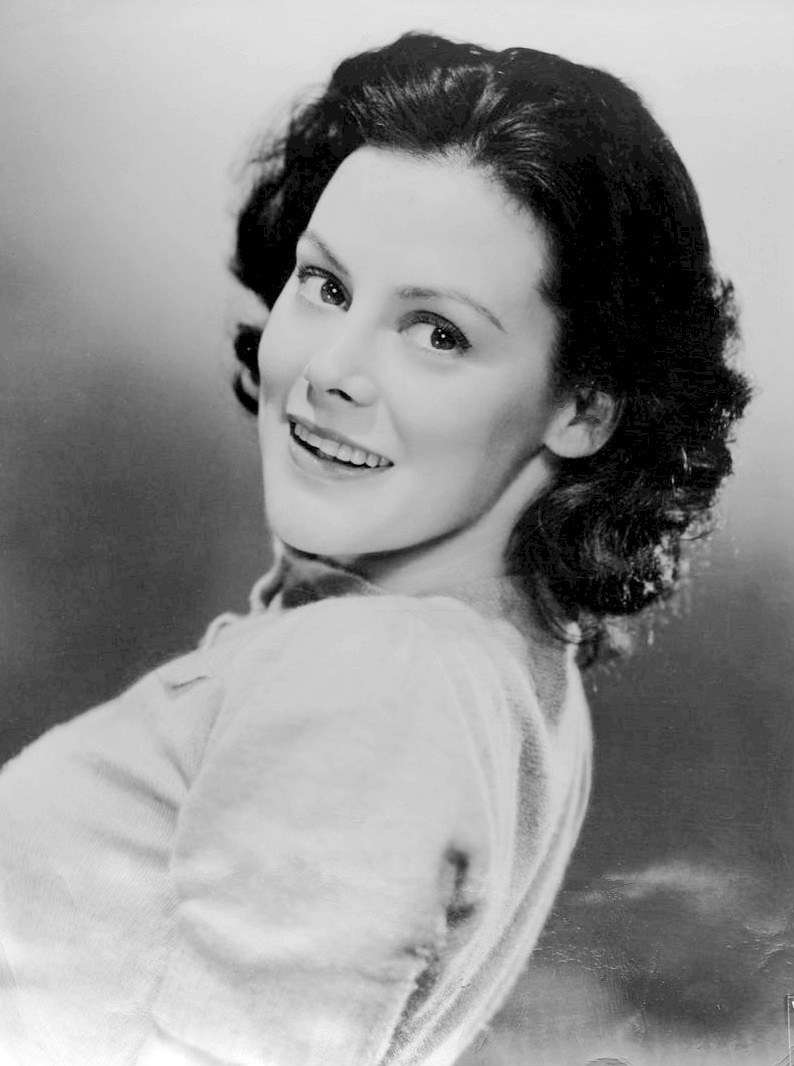
- Mack in April 1941
- Born: Helen McDougall; November 13, 1913; Rock Island, Illinois, U.S.
- Died: August 13, 1986 (aged 72); Beverly Hills, California, U.S.
- Occupations: Actress; writer; director; producer
- Years active: 1923–1971
- Known for: His Girl Friday; Son of Kong
- Spouses: Charles Irwin (m. 1935; div. 1938) Thomas McAvity (m. 1940; died 1972)

Helen Mack (born Helen McDougall; November 13, 1913 – August 13, 1986) was an American actress. She started her career as a child actress in silent films, moving to Broadway plays and touring one of the vaudeville circuits. Her greater success as an actress was as a leading lady in the 1930s. She made the transition to performing on radio and then into writing, directing, and producing shows during the Golden Age of Radio. She later wrote for Broadway, stage and television. Her career spanned the infancy of the motion picture industry, the beginnings of Broadway, the final days of vaudeville, the transition to sound movies, the Golden Age of Radio, and the rise of television.

== Youth and stage ==
Mack was born in Rock Island, Illinois, the daughter of William George McDougall, a barber, and Regina (née Lenzer) McDougall, who had a repressed desire to become an actress. She attended the Professional Children's School of New York City. Her friend Vera Gordon helped her along as a child actress. She appeared on Broadway and in vaudeville and debuted in films at age 10 in 1924. Her stage debut was in The Idle Inn with Jacob Benami. She performed with Roland Young in Pomeroy's Past, and toured America with William Hodge in Straight Through The Door.

== Film actress ==
Mack began her film career, first billed as Helen Macks, at the age of 10 in the 1923 silent Success, featuring Brandon Tynan, Naomi Childers and Mary Astor. In Zaza, Mack worked with Gloria Swanson. She had a small role in D. W. Griffith's last film The Struggle (1931).

Her Fox Film screen test came in March 1931, and within three weeks she was on the studio lot. She made her debut as a leading lady opposite Victor McLaglen in While Paris Sleeps (1932) and was cast with John Boles in his initial Fox Film venture Scotch Valley. She played in several westerns in the early 1930s, including Fargo Express (1933) with Ken Maynard and The California Trail with Buck Jones.

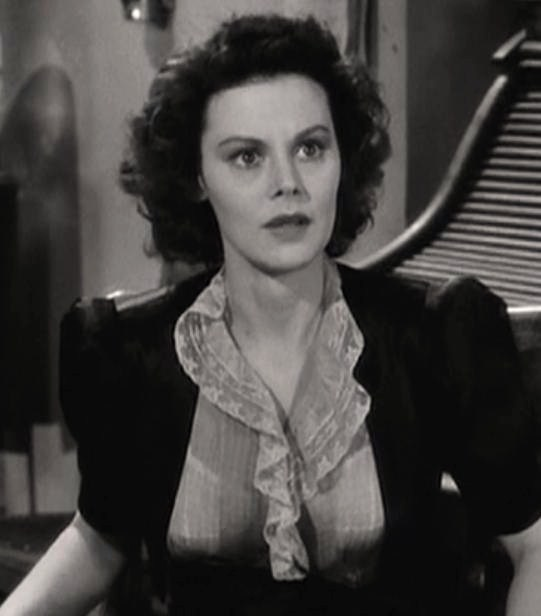
Mack in His Girl Friday (1940)

Before the film Sweepings (1933), Mack's career had declined for three years. Three of her productions failed. One reason was that she was usually a character star, and her employers had used her as an ingenue. RKO Radio Pictures Inc. offered her a second chance as Mamie Donahue in Sweepings.

She may be best remembered for the 1933 movie sequel The Son of Kong, as Harold Lloyd's sister in The Milky Way (1936), and as suicidal Molly Malloy in the screwball crime comedy His Girl Friday (1940) with Cary Grant and Rosalind Russell. She also played an important role as Tanya in Merian C. Cooper's production of H. Rider Haggard's She (1935). Her other roles included the bank-robbing ingenue opposite Richard Cromwell and Lionel Atwill in 1937's The Wrong Road for RKO.

== Later career ==
In the early 1940s, Mack performed in the radio series Myrt and Marge, replacing actress Donna Damerel after Damerel's sudden death in childbirth. She was chosen from more than 200 applicants for the role.

During that decade and the next, Mack also worked as a producer and director of radio programs, including such series as Richard Diamond, Private Detective; The Saint; and Meet Corliss Archer. She also co-wrote A Date with Judy with Aleen Leslie, and was its producer-director, one of the few women to fill that role in network radio. Her friend Leslie originally wanted Mack to play the title role, but they decided she was too old for the high-school-girl part when the series begain in 1941. As TV displaced radio, Mack continued to write plays and TV episodes until her death.

In 1949, she collaborated with Roger Price in writing the children's record Gossamer Wump, narrated by Frank Morgan and released by Capitol Records.

== Private life ==
Mack married lawyer Charles Irwin in San Francisco in February 1935,

Mack died from cancer at the home of her friend Aleen Leslie in Beverly Hills on August 13, 1986.

== Filmography ==
- Success (1923) as Ruth
- Zaza (1923) as Lucille Dufresne (uncredited)
- Under the Red Robe (1923) (uncredited)
- Grit (1924) (uncredited)
- Pied Piper Malone (1924) as Child
- The Struggle (1931) as A catty girl
- The Silent Witness (1932) as Sylvia Pierce
- While Paris Sleeps (1932) as Manon Cortaud
- Sweepings (1933) as Mamie Donahue
- The California Trail (1933) as Delores Ramirez
- Melody Cruise (1933) as Laurie Marlowe
- Blind Adventure (1933) as Rose Thorne
- Christopher Bean (1933) as Susan Haggett
- Fargo Express (1933) as Helen Clark
- Son of Kong (1933) as Hilda Petersen
- All of Me (1934) as Eve Haron
- Kiss And Make Up (1934) as Anne
- You Belong to Me (1934) as Florette Faxon
- The Lemon Drop Kid (1934) as Alice Deering
- College Rhythm (1934) as June Cort
- Captain Hurricane (1935) as Susan "Matey" Ann
- Four Hours to Kill! (1935) as Helen
- She (1935) as Tanya Dugmore
- The Return of Peter Grimm (1935) as Catherine
- The Milky Way (1936) as Mae Sullivan
- A Doctor's Diary (1937) as Nurse (uncredited)
- I Promise to Pay (1937) as Mary Lang
- You Can't Buy Luck (1937) as Betty McKay
- The Last Train from Madrid (1937) as Lola
- Fit for a King (1937) as Jane Hamilton / Princess Helen
- The Wrong Road (1937) as Ruth Holden
- King of the Newsboys (1938) as Mary Ellen Stephens
- I Stand Accused (1938) as Alison Cooper
- Secrets of a Nurse (1938) as Katherine MacDonald
- Gambling Ship (1938) as Mollie Riley
- Mystery of the White Room (1939) as Carole Dale
- Mickey the Kid (1939) as Telephone Operator (uncredited)
- Calling All Marines (1939) as Judy Fox
- His Girl Friday (1940) as Mollie Malloy
- Girls of the Road (1940) as Mickey
- Power Dive (1941) as Betty Coles
- And Now Tomorrow (1944) as Angelletta Gallo
- Strange Holiday (1945) as Miss Sims, Secretary
- Divorce (1945) as Martha Phillips

== Sources ==
- New York Times, "The Screen", July 10, 1923, Page 22.
- Los Angeles Times, "New Move Marks War On WAMPAS", August 24, 1931, Page A1.
- Los Angeles Times, "Helen Mack Wins Boles Lead", December 22, 1931, Page A7.
- Los Angeles Times, "Actress Assigned", November 8, 1932, Page 11.
- Los Angeles Times, "Newcomer, Helen Mack, Conspicuous", April 2, 1933, Page A3.
- Los Angeles Times, "Films' Revolting Daughters Turn Out To Be Meek Lambs", April 30, 1933, Page A7.
- Los Angeles Times, "Helen Mack Chimes Ring", February 14, 1935, Page 1.
- Lowell, Massachusetts Sun, "Helen Mack Born Actress", January 18, 1934, Page 42.
- Sheboygan, Wisconsin The Press, "Three Debutante Stars On Way To Stardom With Fox", September 11, 1931, Page 14.
- Picture Show, "Helen Mack and Her Films", August 17, 1935, Page 18.
- Syracuse Herald-Journal, "Hollywood", November 2, 1939, Page 21.
