= While Paris Sleeps (1932 film) =

1932 film

- Directed by: Allan Dwan
- Written by: Basil Woon
- Produced by: William Sistrom
- Starring: Victor McLaglen; Helen Mack; Rita La Roy
- Cinematography: Glen MacWilliams
- Edited by: Jack Murray; Paul Weatherwax
- Music by: Arthur Kay
- Production company: Fox Film Corporation
- Distributed by: Fox Film Corporation
- Release date: May 8, 1932
- Running time: 67 minutes
- Country: United States
- Language: English

While Paris Sleeps is a 1932 American pre-Code drama film directed by Allan Dwan and starring Victor McLaglen, Helen Mack and Rita La Roy.

== Plot ==
Jacques Costaud, a French war veteran is sentenced to life in prison for killing a man but soon escapes from a penal colony in French Guiana. He then flees to Paris to find his daughter Manon, who believes him dead. Now he must try to keep her from being abducted into a life of prostitution and keeping his true identity a secret.

== Cast ==
- Victor McLaglen as Jacques Costaud
- Helen Mack as Manon Costaud
- William Bakewell as Paul Renoir
- Jack La Rue as Julot
- Rita La Roy as Fifi
- Maurice Black as Roca
- Dot Farley as the Concierge
- Lucille La Verne as Mme. Golden Bonnet
- Paul Porcasi as Kapas
- Edward Dillon as the Concierge's husband
- Arthur Stone as Mouche
- Martin J. Faust as Apache
