= The Wrong Road =

1937 film by James Cruze

- Directed by: James Cruze
- Written by: Gordon Rigby (screenplay and story); Eric Taylor (writer)
- Produced by: Colbert Clark
- Starring: Richard Cromwell; Helen Mack; Lionel Atwill
- Cinematography: Ernest Miller
- Edited by: William Morgan
- Music by: Alberto Colombo
- Distributed by: Republic Pictures
- Release date: October 11, 1937
- Running time: 62 minutes 53 minutes (U.S. edited version for television)
- Country: United States
- Language: English

The Wrong Road is a 1937 American crime drama film directed by James Cruze and starring Richard Cromwell, Helen Mack, and Lionel Atwill. The film is now in the public domain.

== Plot ==
A young unmarried couple (Cromwell and Mack), whose plans for their life together have not turned out as expected, decide to steal $100,000 from the bank where the boyfriend works, then hide the money in a safe place and return for it after they serve out their prison sentences.

All goes according to plan until they get out of prison, when they find that they're being trailed by an insurance investigator (Atwill), who has a soft spot for the couple and would like to see them go straight, and the boyfriend's old cellmate, who wants a cut of the money.

== Cast ==
- Richard Cromwell as Jimmy Caldwell
- Helen Mack as Ruth Holden
- Lionel Atwill as Mike Roberts
- Horace McMahon as Blackie Clayton
- Russ Powell as Chief Ira Foster
- Billy Bevan as McLean
- Marjorie Main as Martha Foster
- Rex Evans as Victor J. Holbrook
- Joseph Crehan as District Attorney
- Arthur Hoyt as Beamish, bank teller
- Syd Saylor as Big Hobo
- Selmer Jackson as Judge
- Chester Clute as Dan O'Fearna
