= Yes or No? (1920 film) =

1920 film

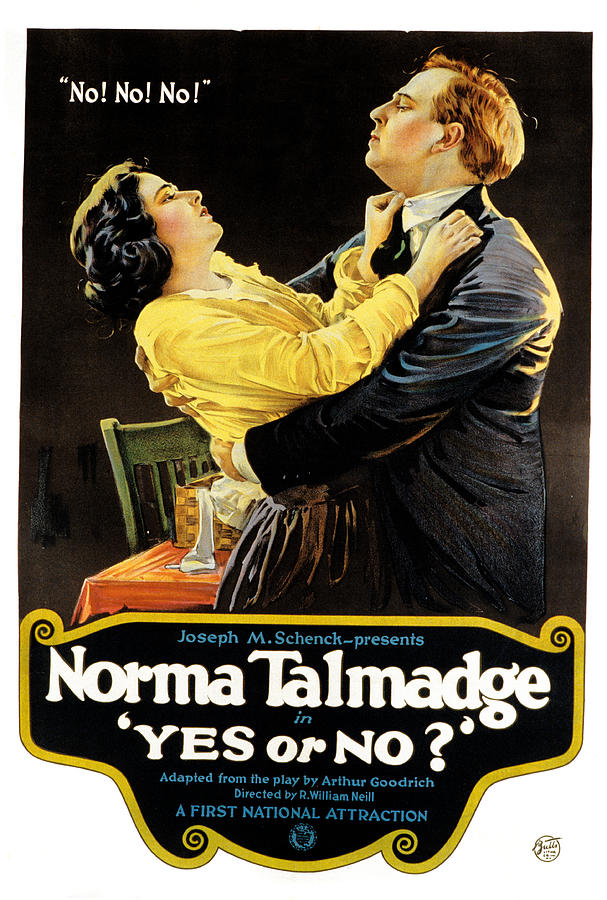
- Film poster: featuring images of Norma Talmadge and Gladden James
- Directed by: Roy William Neill
- Written by: Mary Murillo
- Based on: Yes or No by Arthur Goodrich
- Produced by: Norma Talmadge; Joseph Schenck
- Starring: Norma Talmadge; Lowell Sherman; Gladden James
- Cinematography: Ernest Haller
- Production company: Norma Talmadge Film Corporation
- Distributed by: First National
- Release date: June 28, 1920
- Running time: 72 minutes
- Country: United States
- Language: Silent (English intertitles)

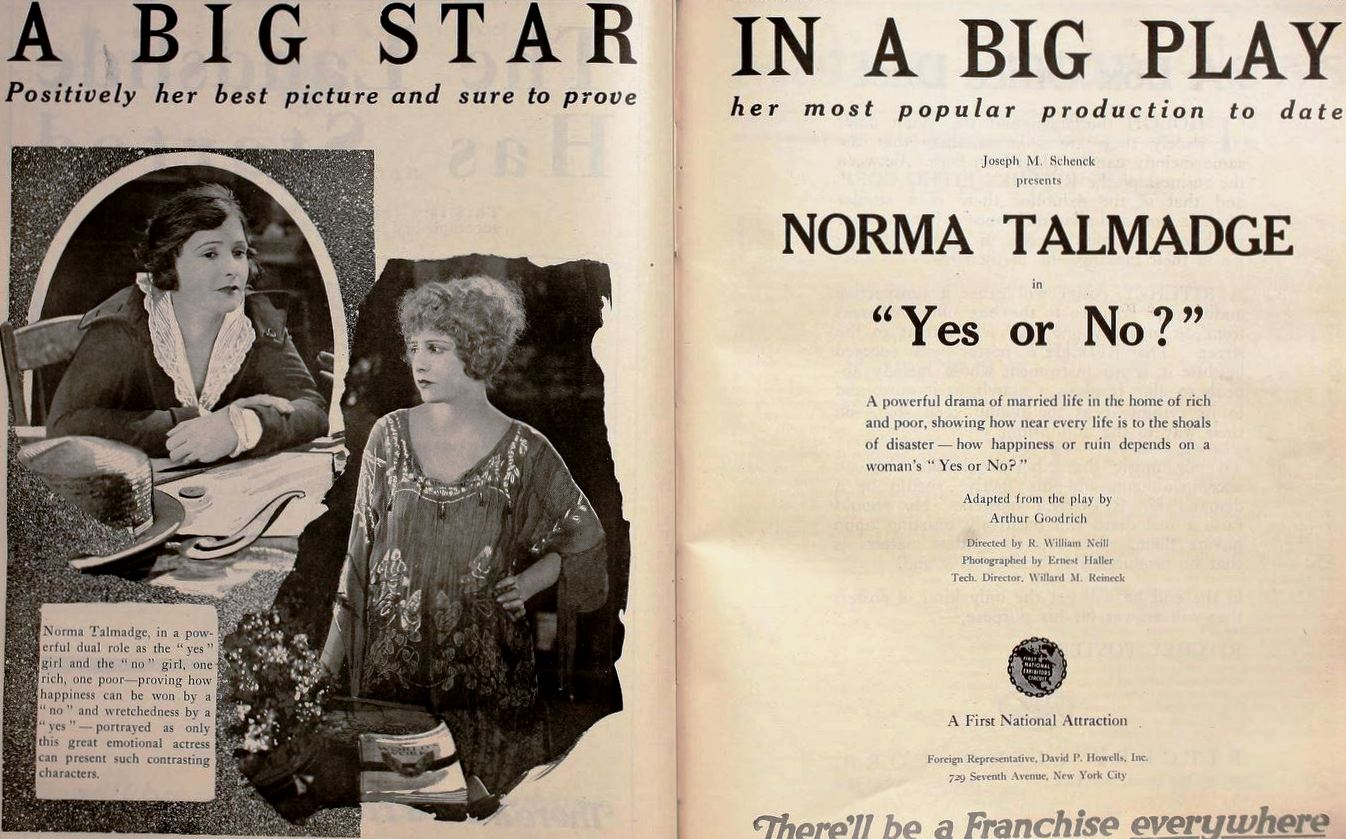
Ad for film.

Yes or No? is a 1920 American silent drama film directed by Roy William Neill and starring Norma Talmadge in a dual role. It is based on the 1917 Broadway play Yes or No by Arthur Goodrich. Talmadge and Joe Schenck produced the picture and released it through First National Exhibitors.

It is preserved at the Library of Congress Packard Campus for Audio-Visual Conservation.

Despite the title as displayed on the film's theatrical poster including a question mark, the film is very often referred to as Yes or No.

== Cast ==
- Norma Talmadge as Margaret Vane / Minnie Berry
- Frederick Burton as Donald Vane
- Lowell Sherman as Paul Derreck
- Lionel Adams as Dr. Malloy
- Rockliffe Fellowes as Jack Berry
- Natalie Talmadge as Emma Martin
- Edward Brophy as Tom Martin (credited as Edward S. Brophy)
- Dudley Clements as Horace Hooker
- Gladden James as Ted Leach
