= Are You There? (film) =

1931 film

- Directed by: Hamilton MacFadden
- Screenplay by: Harlan Thompson
- Starring: Beatrice Lillie; John Garrick; Olga Baclanova; George Grossmith Jr. Roger Davis; Jillian Sand
- Cinematography: Joseph Valentine
- Edited by: Alfred DeGaetano
- Production company: Fox Film Corporation
- Distributed by: Fox Film Corporation
- Release date: November 30, 1930
- Running time: 60 minutes
- Country: United States
- Language: English

Are You There? is a 1930 American pre-Code comedy film directed by Hamilton MacFadden and written by Harlan Thompson. The film stars Beatrice Lillie, John Garrick, Olga Baclanova, George Grossmith Jr., Roger Davis and Jillian Sand. The film was exhibited in small theaters on November 30, 1930, and was released nationally on May 3, 1931, by Fox Film Corporation.

== Cast ==
- Beatrice Lillie as Shirley Travis
- John Garrick as Lord Geoffrey Troon
- Olga Baclanova as Countess Helenka
- George Grossmith Jr. as Duke of St. Pancras
- Roger Davis as Barber
- Jillian Sand as Barbara Blythe
- Gustav von Seyffertitz as Barber
- Nicholas Soussanin as Barber
- Richard Alexander as International crook
- Henry Victor as International crook
- Lloyd Hamilton as Hostler
- Paula Langlen as Page
