= Loyal Lives =

1923 film

- Directed by: Charles Giblyn
- Written by: Dorothy Farnum; Charles G. Rich
- Produced by: Whitman Bennett
- Starring: Brandon Tynan; Mary Carr; Faire Binney
- Cinematography: Edward Paul
- Production company: Postman Pictures
- Distributed by: Vitagraph Company of America
- Release date: July 26, 1923
- Running time: 60 minutes
- Country: United States
- Languages: Silent; English intertitles

Loyal Lives is a 1923 American silent drama film directed by Charles Giblyn and starring Brandon Tynan, Mary Carr and Faire Binney.

== Cast ==
- Brandon Tynan as Dan O'Brien
- Mary Carr as Mary O'Brien
- Faire Binney as Peggy
- William Collier Jr. as Terrence
- Charles Mcdonald as Michael O'Hara
- Blanche Craig as Lizzie O'Hara
- Chester Morris as Tom O'Hara
- Tom Blake as Brady
- Blanche Davenport as Mrs. Brady
- Jack Hopkins as Judkins
- Mickey Bennett as Terrence, as a child

== Bibliography ==
- Munden, Kenneth White. The American Film Institute Catalog of Motion Pictures Produced in the United States, Part 1. University of California Press, 1997.
