= Youth Takes a Fling =

1938 film by Archie Mayo

- Directed by: Archie Mayo
- Written by: Myles Connolly (writer)
- Produced by: Joe Pasternak
- Cinematography: Rudolph Maté
- Edited by: Philip Cahn
- Distributed by: Universal Pictures
- Release date: September 23, 1938
- Running time: 77 minutes
- Country: United States
- Language: English
- Budget: $676,000

Youth Takes a Fling is a 1938 American comedy film directed by Archie Mayo and starring Joel McCrea.

One of Leeds relatively few films, both she and McCrea were loaned to Universal from Samuel Goldwyn.

== Plot ==
Joe Meadows, whose only ambition as a Kansas farm boy was a life at sea, moves to New York to try to get a job as a sailor. He finds it more difficult than he thought, and meets Helen Brown, who falls for him and uses her feminine wiles to try to prevent him leaving.

== Cast ==
- Joel McCrea as Joe Meadows
- Andrea Leeds as Helen Brown
- Frank Jenks as Frank Munson
- Dorothea Kent as Jean
- Isabel Jeans as Mrs. Merrivale
- Virginia Grey as Madge
- Grant Mitchell as Duke
- Henry Mollison as Dunham
- Brandon Tynan as Tad
- Oscar O'Shea as Captain Walters
- Granville Bates as Mr. Judd
- Roger Davis as Floorwalker
- Marion Martin as Girl on Beach
- Olaf Hytten as Dunham's Butler
- Willie Best as George
- Catherine Proctor as Mrs. Aspitt
- Yvonne Boisseau as Miss Beaton
- Arthur Housman as First Communist
- John Sheehan as Second Communist
- Chester Clute as Salesman
- Wade Boteler as Tugboat Captain
- Tom Dugan as Bum
- Eddie Acuff as Bum
- Mary Field as Maid
