= The California Trail =

1933 film

- Directed by: Lambert Hillyer
- Screenplay by: Lambert Hillyer
- Story by: Jack Natteford
- Starring: Buck Jones; Helen Mack; Luis Alberni; George Humbert; Charles Stevens; Carlos Villarías
- Cinematography: Benjamin H. Kline
- Edited by: Gene Milford
- Production company: Columbia Pictures
- Distributed by: Columbia Pictures
- Release date: March 24, 1933
- Running time: 67 minutes
- Country: United States
- Language: English

The California Trail is a 1933 American pre-Code Western film directed by Lambert Hillyer starring Buck Jones, Helen Mack and Luis Alberni.

== Cast ==
- Buck Jones as Santa Fe Stewart (as Charles 'Buck' Jones)
- Helen Mack as Dolores Ramirez
- Luis Alberni as Commandant Emilio Quierra
- George Humbert as Mayor Alberto Piedra (as George Humbart)
- Charles Stevens as Juan
- Carlos Villarías as Governor Carlos Moreno (as Carlos Villar)
- Chris-Pin Martin as Pancho (as Chrispin Martin)
- Carmen Laroux as Juan's wife (as Carmen La Roux)
- William Steele as Pedro (as Robert Steele)
- Al Ernest Garcia as Sergeant Florez (as Allan Garcia)
- Émile Chautard as Don Marco Ramirez (as Emile Chautard)
