= The Mind Reader =

1933 film by Roy Del Ruth

- Theatrical release poster
- Directed by: Roy Del Ruth
- Screenplay by: Robert Lord; Wilson Mizner
- Based on: a play by Vivian Cosby
- Produced by: Hal B. Wallis
- Starring: Warren William; Constance Cummings; Allen Jenkins; Natalie Moorhead; Mayo Methot; Clarence Muse
- Cinematography: Sol Polito
- Edited by: James Gibbon
- Music by: Bernhard Kaun
- Production company: First National Pictures
- Distributed by: Warner Bros. Pictures
- Release date: April 1, 1933
- Running time: 70 minutes
- Country: United States
- Language: English

The Mind Reader is a 1933 American pre-Code drama film directed by Roy Del Ruth and written by Robert Lord and Wilson Mizner. The film stars Warren William, Constance Cummings, Allen Jenkins, Natalie Moorhead, Mayo Methot and Clarence Muse. The film was released by Warner Bros. Pictures on April 1, 1933. The film was based on a play by Vivian Crosby.

== Plot ==
Following carnivals and performing small cons with his pals Frank and Sam, Chandra decides to have a go at a fake psychic scam, posing as a clairvoyant who can read minds and find lost items. Life becomes complicated when he falls in love with Sylvia, the niece of one of his marks, who believes his power to be real. The two marry, and Chandra tries to keep the truth from his bride, but a tragedy reveals his dishonesty.

== Cast ==
- Warren William as Chandra
- Constance Cummings as Sylvia
- Allen Jenkins as Frank
- Natalie Moorhead as Mrs. Austin
- Mayo Methot as Jenny
- Clarence Muse as Sam
- Earle Foxe as Don
- George Chandler as Reporter
- Wilson Benge as the bearded tooth pulling victim
