= Crime Without Passion =

1934 film by Ben Hecht

- Directed by: Ben Hecht; Charles MacArthur
- Written by: Ben Hecht; Charles MacArthur
- Produced by: Ben Hecht; Charles MacArthur
- Starring: Claude Rains
- Cinematography: Lee Garmes
- Distributed by: Paramount Pictures
- Release date: August 30, 1934
- Running time: 70 minutes
- Country: United States
- Language: English

Crime Without Passion is a 1934 American drama film directed by Ben Hecht and Charles MacArthur and starring Claude Rains. It is the first of four pictures written, produced and directed by Hecht and MacArthur for Paramount Pictures. Sixty to seventy percent of the film was directed by cinematographer Lee Garmes.

== Plot ==
The plot centers around a clever and suave but unscrupulous and dishonest lawyer Lee Gentry (Rains) who boasts that he "lives by lies". His attempts to finish his two-timing affair with a clinging, besotted cabaret artist do not go according to plan.

== Cast ==
- Claude Rains as Lee Gentry
- Margo as Carmen Brown
- Whitney Bourne as Katy Costello
- Stanley Ridges as Eddie White
- Leslie Adams as District Attorney O'Brien
- Alice Anthon as Extra (uncredited)
- Dorothy Bradshaw as A Fury (uncredited)
- Fanny Brice as Buster Molloy (uncredited)
- Jack Carr as Defendant (uncredited)
- Esther Dale as Miss Keeley (uncredited)
- Fraye Gilbert as A Fury (uncredited)
- Greta Granstedt as Della (uncredited)
- Helen Hayes as Extra in hotel lobby (uncredited)
- Ben Hecht as Court interviewer with pipe (uncredited)
- Ethelyne Holt as Extra (uncredited)
- Charles Anthony Hughes as Extra (uncredited)
- Alice Jefferson as Extra (uncredited)
- Charles Rann Kennedy as Police Lt. Norton (uncredited)
- Mickey King as Extra (uncredited)
- Charles MacArthur as 2d Interviewer (light suit) (uncredited)
- Cornelius MacSunday as Gentry's butler (uncredited)
- Marjorie Main as Backstage Wardrobe Woman (uncredited)
- Marion Martin as Theatre Cashier (uncredited)
- Fuller Mellish as Judge (uncredited)
- Betty Real as Waitress who slaps Lee Gentry (uncredited)
- Betty Sundmark as A Fury (uncredited)
- Bobby Duncan Troupe as Ensemble (uncredited)
- Paula Trueman (uncredited)

== Critical reception ==
In The New York Times, Mordaunt Hall found "a drama blessed with marked originality and photographed with consummate artistry," and cited one of its many pluses as "that of having Claude Rains in the main rôle."

== Bibliography ==
- Eames, John Douglas, The Paramount Story, London: Octopus Books, 1985 ISBN 0-5175-5348-1
