= Arthur Goodrich =

American dramatist (1878–1941)

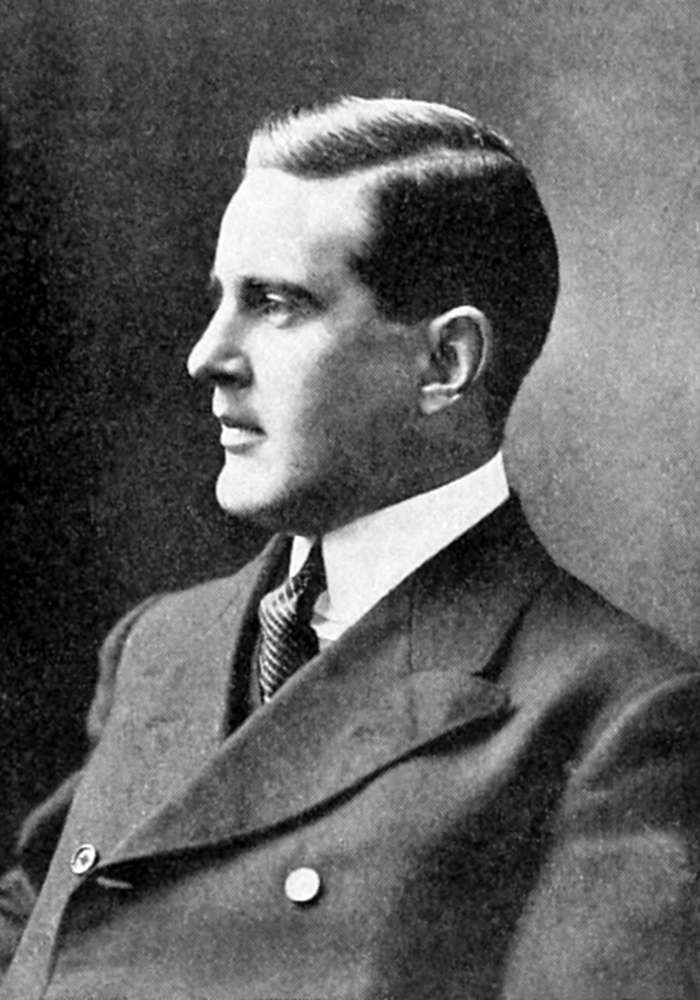
- Arthur Goodrich in 1906
- Born: February 18, 1878; New Britain, Connecticut; United States
- Died: June 26, 1941 (aged 63); New York, New York; United States
- Occupation: Playwright

Arthur Frederick Goodrich (February 18, 1878 – June 26, 1941) was an American novelist and playwright who was prominent on Broadway during the 1920s and 1930s. He wrote a mixture of crime and comedy plays. One of his greatest hits was the 1922 Anglo-American culture clash comedy So This Is London, which was turned into films twice. He wrote the libretto for an opera version of Caponsacchi.

== Selected works ==
=== Novels ===
- The Balance of Power (1906)

=== Plays ===
- Yes or No (1917) — filmed as Yes or No? (1919)
- So This Is London (1922) — filmed in 1930 and 1939
- The Joker (1925)
- The Plutocrat (1930)
- The Perfect Marriage (1932)
- A Journey by Night (1935)
