= First Lady (film) =

1937 film by Stanley Logan

- Directed by: Stanley Logan
- Screenplay by: Rowland Leigh
- Based on: First Lady; 1935 play by George S. Kaufman; Katharine Dayton
- Produced by: Harry Joe Brown (uncredited associate producer)
- Starring: Kay Francis; Preston Foster; Anita Louise; Walter Connolly; Verree Teasdale
- Cinematography: Sidney Hickox
- Edited by: Ralph Dawson
- Music by: Leo F. Forbstein
- Production company: Warner Bros. Pictures
- Distributed by: Warner Bros. Pictures
- Release date: December 4, 1937
- Running time: 83 minutes
- Country: United States
- Language: English
- Budget: $485,000
- Box office: $424,000

First Lady is a 1937 film about behind-the-scenes political maneuverings in Washington, D.C. directed by Stanley Logan and starring Kay Francis, Preston Foster, Anita Louise, Walter Connolly and Verree Teasdale. Francis and Teasdale portray bitter rivals in their pursuit of the title role of First Lady. The picture is based on the 1935 play of the same name by George S. Kaufman and Katharine Dayton.

== Plot ==
The granddaughter of a President of the United States, Lucy Chase Wayne discreetly campaigns to gain the presidential nomination for her beloved husband, Secretary of State Stephen Wayne. She tries to gain the support of rising Senator Gordon Keane, a victory that would be doubly sweet inasmuch as he is the protégé of her despised arch-rival, Irene Hibbard.

Lucy becomes concerned when rumors reach her that Irene intends to divorce her boring Supreme Court Justice spouse, Carter, marry Keane, and try to get him elected president. She concocts a scheme to deceive Irene into believing that Carter will be her party's candidate in the upcoming election (when she knows that he has no chance whatsoever) and force Irene to abort her own plans. Lucy convinces Lavinia Mae Creevey, the narrow-minded, provincial leader of an organization of five million women, to back Carter. To Lucy's horror, newspaper magnate Ellsworth T. Banning adds his support, and Carter is indeed offered the nomination.

Lucy learns that Prince Boris Gregoravitch, Irene's ex-husband, is in Washington for negotiations. Learning something interesting from the prince, she has her husband invite the foreign envoy to the dinner in which Carter is to announce his acceptance of the nomination. Gregoravitch is delighted to see Irene and gives her some "good" news. On behalf of his country, he has reached an agreement with the United States in which both sides will recognize each other's laws. Once the treaty is signed, he and Irene will be considered divorced by the American legal system. Until then however, Irene is technically a bigamist. Lucy blackmails Irene into getting Carter to decline the nomination, leaving the way free for her husband.

== Cast ==
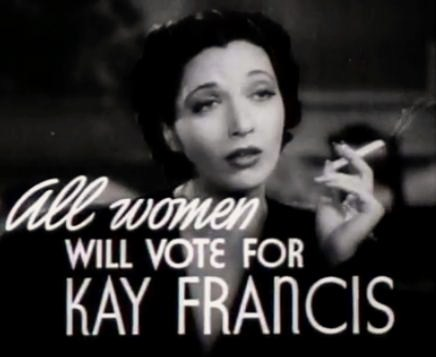
From the trailer

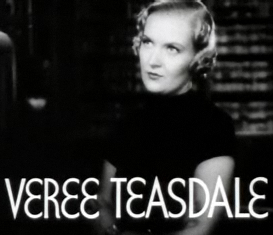
From the trailer

- Kay Francis as Lucy Chase Wayne
- Preston Foster as Stephen Wayne
- Anita Louise as Emmy Page, Lucy's niece
- Walter Connolly as Carter Hibbard
- Verree Teasdale as Irene Hibbard
- Victor Jory as Senator Gordon Keane
- Marjorie Rambeau as Belle Hardwick
- Marjorie Gateson as Sophy Prescott
- Louise Fazenda as Lavinia Mae Creevey
- Henry O'Neill as Judge George Mason
- Grant Mitchell as Ellsworth T. Banning
- Eric Stanley as Senator Tom Hardwicke
- Lucile Gleason as Mrs. Mary Ives (as Lucille Gleason)
- Sara Haden as Mrs. Mason
- Harry Davenport as Charles
- Gregory Gaye as Prince Boris Gregoravitch
- Olaf Hytten as Bleeker

== See also ==
- Rachel Jackson, who married future President Andrew Jackson in the mistaken belief that she was divorced

== Reception ==
Frank S. Nugent of The New York Times wrote that the film had "a number of superb minor performances," but "was still a talkative piece which only crosses the threshold of one drawing room to pull up before the fireplace of another. But the talk is good, if small; and if small, at least it stings." Variety called it "amusing, if somewhat chatty" with an "excellent cast, good direction and tasteful production". Harrison's Reports found the film "extremely well acted" and "good entertainment for high-class audiences", but thought that some of the subtle comedy "may go over the head of the ordinary picture-goer." John Mosher of The New Yorker called the film "lively" and was "delighted" by several of the performances.

According to Warner Bros records the film only earned $322,000 in the US and Canada and $102,000 elsewhere.
