= The Great Man Votes =

1939 film by Garson Kanin

- theatrical poster
- Directed by: Garson Kanin
- Screenplay by: John Twist; Garson Kanin (uncredited)
- Based on: "The Great Man Votes" (short story) by Gordon Malherbe Hillman
- Produced by: Cliff Reid
- Starring: John Barrymore
- Cinematography: Russell Metty
- Edited by: Jack Hively
- Music by: Roy Webb
- Distributed by: RKO Radio Pictures
- Release date: January 13, 1939 (US)
- Running time: 72 minutes
- Country: United States
- Language: English
- Budget: $265,000
- Box office: $432,000

The Great Man Votes is a 1939 American drama film starring John Barrymore as a widowed professor turned drunkard who has the deciding vote in an election for mayor. It was based on the short story of the same name by Gordon Malherbe Hillman published in the November 1933 issue of American Magazine. The plot of the 2008 movie Swing Vote has been compared to The Great Man Votes.

== Plot ==
Former Harvard professor Gregory Vance, now an outcast alcoholic in a small city, is introduced hitching a ride with the local milkman, who also delivers alcohol to him, after his shift in his current job as a night watchman. Despite his alcoholism, Vance cares for his children, Joan and Donald, bringing them up on the classics, teaching them Latin, and having them recite Shakespeare. They in turn look after their father and his reputation.

After an altercation between his children and some bullies, led by the son of "Iron Hat" McCarthy, the local political boss, Vance is visited by his children's teacher, Agnes Billow, and the two become friendly with each other, especially as she realizes that Vance is a writer she greatly respected and he reveals that his fall from respectability began with the death of the children's mother.

With a city election for mayor nearing, Iron Hat is informed that every vote in the city is already locked in place, with a likely tie between the boss's handpicked current mayor and a rival, with one exception in one crucial ward—Gregory Vance. At the same time, Vance's wealthy in-laws are threatening to take custody of his children, something Joan and Donald do not want, despite the material advantages that would offer them.

Trying to woo Vance for his vote, Iron Hat offers him a low-level job with the city, but the children are able to raise the bargaining stakes until Vance is offered the post of Commissioner of Education. Vance himself is reluctant to be a party to such dirty politics, but when he demands getting the job offer in writing, he is able to expose the corruption of the mayor and Iron Hat. Now socially respectable and a new man, Vance is able to turn over a new leaf, presumably along with Miss Billow.

== Cast ==
- John Barrymore as Gregory Vance
- Peter Holden as Donald Ainslee Vance
- Virginia Weidler as Joan Vance
- Katherine Alexander as Agnes Billow
- Donald McBride as Iron Hat McCarthy
- Benny Bartlett as Davy McCarthy
- Brandon Tynan as Chester Ainslee
- Elisabeth Risdon as Phoebe Ainslee
- Granville Bates as the Mayor
- Luis Alberni as Manos
- J. M. Kerrigan as Hot Shot Gillings
- William Demarest as Charles Dale
- Wayne and Warren Hull as Twins Running Alongside Car

== Reception ==
The film recorded a loss of $10,000.
