= So This Is London (play) =

Play written by Arthur Goodrich

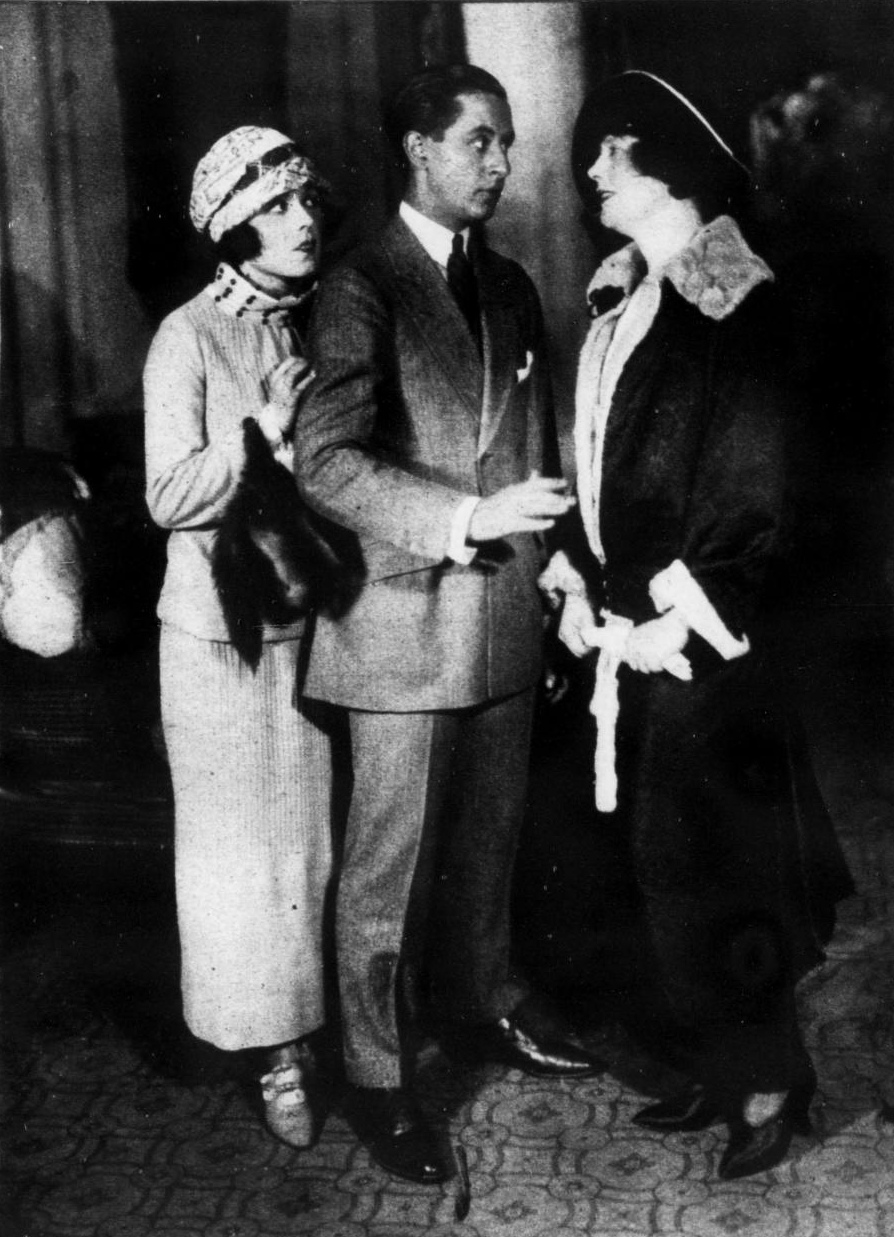
Marie Carroll, Donald Gallaher and Lily Cahill in the original Broadway production of So This Is London (1922)

So This Is London is a comedy play by the American writer Arthur Goodrich, first staged in 1922. The play depicts an Anglo-American culture clash, in which a wealthy anglophobic American shoe manufacturer arrives in London to discover his son is marrying the daughter of British aristocrats.

== Adaptations ==
The play was turned into a film of the same name on two occasions. The first, produced in America in 1930, starred Will Rogers and Irene Rich, and the second, produced in Britain in 1939, featured Alfred Drayton and George Sanders.

== Bibliography ==
- Bordman, Gerald. American Theatre: A Chronicle of Comedy and Drama 1914-1930. Oxford University Press, 1996.
- Kabatchnik, Amnon. Blood on the Stage, 1925-1950: Milestone Plays of Crime, Mystery and Detection. Scarecrow Press, 2010.
