= Success (1923 film) =

1923 film by Ralph Ince

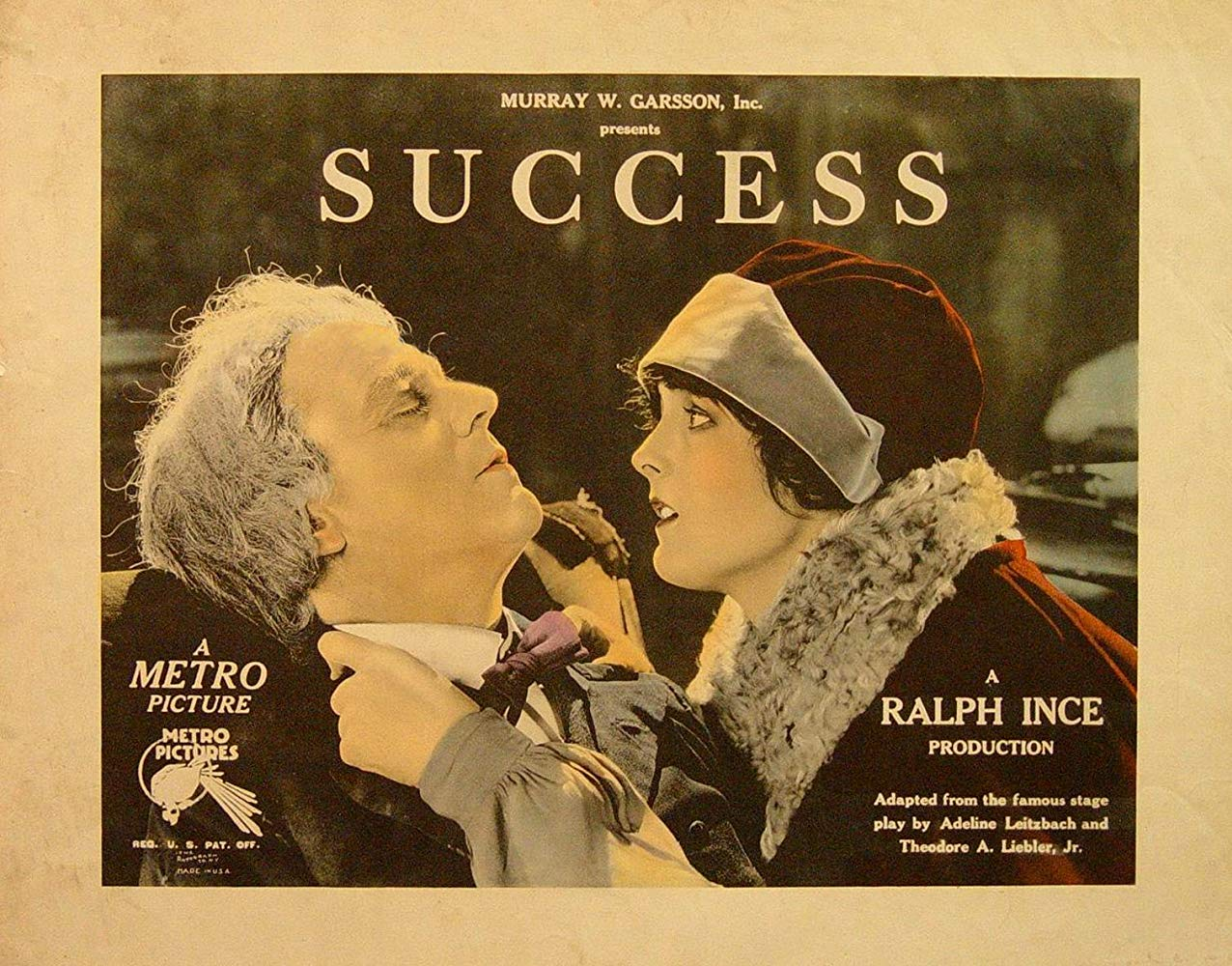
- Directed by: Ralph Ince
- Written by: George V. Hobart; Adeline Leitzbach; Theodore A. Liebler Jr.
- Produced by: Murray W. Garrson
- Starring: Brandon Tynan; Naomi Childers; Mary Astor
- Cinematography: William J. Black
- Production company: Murray W. Garsson Productions
- Distributed by: Metro Pictures Corporation
- Release date: February 25, 1923
- Running time: 70 minutes
- Country: United States
- Language: Silent (English intertitles)

Success is a 1923 American silent drama film directed by Ralph Ince and starring Brandon Tynan, Naomi Childers, and Mary Astor.

== Cast ==
- Brandon Tynan as Barry Carleton
- Naomi Childers as Jane Randolph
- Mary Astor as Rose Randolph
- Dore Davidson as Sam Lewis
- Lionel Adams as Willis Potter
- Stanley Ridges as Gilbert Gordon
- Robert Lee Keeling as Henry Briggs
- Billy Quirk as Nick Walker
- Helen Mack as Ruth
- Steve Pendleton as Joe
- John Woodford as Treadwell

== Preservation ==
With no prints of Success located in any film archives, it is a lost film.

== Bibliography ==
- Lowe, Denise. An Encyclopedic Dictionary of Women in Early American Films: 1895-1930. Routledge, 2014.
