= Sinners in Paradise =

1938 film by James Whale

- Directed by: James Whale
- Screenplay by: Lester Cole; Harold Buckley; Louis Stevens
- Story by: Harold Buckley
- Produced by: Ken Goldsmith
- Starring: Madge Evans; John Boles; Bruce Cabot; Marion Martin; Gene Lockhart
- Cinematography: George Robinson
- Edited by: Maurice Wright
- Color process: Black and white
- Production company: James Whale Productions
- Distributed by: Universal Pictures
- Release date: May 19, 1938 (United States)
- Running time: 65 minutes
- Country: United States
- Language: English
- Budget: $273,670

Sinners in Paradise is a 1938 American South Seas adventure film directed by James Whale and starring Madge Evans, John Boles, Bruce Cabot, Marion Martin, and Gene Lockhart. In 1966, the film entered the public domain in the United States because the claimants did not renew its copyright registration in the 28th year after publication.

== Plot ==
A passenger aircraft crashes in the mid-Pacific, and some of the survivors reach an island inhabited only by an American, Jim Taylor, with his Chinese servant, Ping. He declines to help them, telling them to build their own shelter and gather their own food, and though he has a boat and fuel, refuses to take them off. He wants to remain undisturbed because he is wanted for murder. In time, his attitude to the intruders softens as they, despite endless bickering, manage to form a working community, and he finds himself increasingly drawn to an attractive young nurse, Anne Wesson, who is running away from her husband. When the boat is prepared for a trip to civilization, two crooked businessmen from the party steal it with Ping on board. Gunfire is exchanged between the boat and those on shore, and Mrs. Sydney is fatally hit. In a fight, Ping kills both men, and fatally wounded, brings the boat back. The rest can then escape.

== Cast ==
- Madge Evans as Anne Wesson
- John Boles as Jim Taylor
- Bruce Cabot as Robert Malone a.k.a. the Torpedo
- Marion Martin as Iris Compton
- Gene Lockhart as Sen. Corey
- Charlotte Wynters as Thelma Chase
- Nana Bryant as Mrs. Franklin Sydney
- Milburn Stone as Honeyman
- Don "Red" Barry as Jessup (as Donald Barry)
- Morgan Conway as Harrison
- Willie Fung as Ping

== See also ==
- Public domain film
- List of American films of 1938
