= The Great Mike =

1944 film by Wallace Fox

- Directed by: Wallace Fox
- Written by: Martin Mooney (story); Raymond L. Schrock (writer)
- Produced by: Leon Fromkess (producer); Martin Mooney (associate producer)
- Starring: See below
- Cinematography: Jockey Arthur Feindel
- Edited by: Hugh Winn
- Music by: Lee Zahler
- Distributed by: Producers Releasing Corporation
- Release date: November 15, 1944
- Running time: 72 minutes 25 minutes (edited USA TV version)
- Country: United States
- Language: English

The Great Mike is a 1944 American film directed by Wallace Fox.

The film is also known as Great Mike Wins (American TV title).

== Plot summary ==
Young Jimmy Dolan loves his friends Mike the horse and Corky the dog.

While delivering newspapers on his route one day, Mike meets newcomer Colonel Whitley, a famous Kentucky horse breeder who has just leased a horse training farm in the area. Jimmy, a horse racing buff, eagerly introduces himself to the colonel and his horse trainer, James Spencer, and asks if he can watch the colonel's horses work out.

The next morning, Spencer gives Jimmy and his friend Speck a tour of the stables. When Jimmy boasts that Mike could beat the colonel's thoroughbreds, the colonel gruffly insults Mike's ability, causing Jimmy to challenge him to a race. After Mike nearly beats his reigning champion, the colonel, humbled, apologizes and invites Jimmy to breakfast. At the dining table, Jimmy relates the story of how his uncle Joe bought Mike from a famous horse breeder after the man's daughter, Mike's owner, unexpectedly died. Jimmy is saving money from his paper route to pay his uncle for the horse.

As Jimmy breakfasts with the colonel, a letter arrives at the Dolan house from his uncle, informing the boy that he plans to sell Mike to a racing stable for $700. When Jimmy, who has only saved $200, learns of his uncle's intentions, his sympathetic sister Erin suggests he make the horse unappealing to his prospective buyers. The next morning, when the representatives from the stable arrive to inspect Mike, Jimmy coats the horse with mud and instructs him to act lame. The stablemen see through the ruse, however, and while the boy is at school they return to claim the horse.

At his new home, Mike refuses to eat or train, and when the stablemen inform his new owner, movie star Kitty Tremaine, that the horse is lonesome for Corky, she decides to visit the Dolan house and buy the dog. When Kitty learns how heartbroken Jimmy is over Mike's loss, she agrees to sell back the horse, and to finance the deal, Jimmy offers Spencer half ownership in Mike. After Spencer and Jimmy become partners, Spencer warns Jimmy to avoid Erin's beau, William "Sandy" McKay, a jockey who was disbarred for allegedly throwing a race. When Jimmy questions Sandy about the allegations, Sandy replies that he was innocent but never defended himself against his accusers. Satisfied with Sandy's explanation, Jimmy asks him to ride Mike in the horse's first race at Santa Anita.

Meanwhile, a syndicate of gamblers pools its resources to bet on Speed Demon, who they deem to be a sure winner in the race. When Mike wins the race, he upsets the syndicate's plans and makes headlines as "The Great Mike." Spencer and Jimmy then decide to enter Mike in a handicap race, and when the syndicate learns of their plans, it hires Doc Slagle and his brother Bill to put the horse out of commission. One night, the pair sneak into Mike's stable, armed with a hypodermic needle filled with poison. Corky springs to Mike's defense, and when Jimmy hears the dog's growls coming from the barn, he calls Spencer for help. By the time Spencer arrives, however, the Slagles have killed Corky and fled, leaving behind the unused hypodermic needle bearing their fingerprints.

Grieving over Corky's loss, Mike again refuses to train or eat, forcing his withdrawal from the race. One day, after the Slagles have been arrested for their crime, Junior, Jimmy's friend, appears at the stable with news that his family is to be transferred out of state. Junior offers to sell Jimmy Corky's brother Mickey, and when Mickey and Mike begin to cavort, Jimmy realizes that Mike is ready to race again.

Spencer and Jimmy enter Mike in a race against the colonel's champion horse, and when Mike wins the race, he earns the colonel's admiration and a generous purse, which Jimmy uses to finance a newsboys' clubhouse.

== Cast ==
- Stuart Erwin as Jay Spencer
- Robert "Buzz" Henry as Jimmy Dolan
- Carl "Alfalfa" Switzer as Speck
- Edythe Elliott as Mrs. Dolan
- Pierre Watkin as Colonel Whitley
- Gwen Kenyon as Erin Dolan
- Bob Meredith as William "Sandy" McKay
- William Halligan as Doc Scott
- Lane Chandler as Sam Hildur
- Marion Martin as Kitty Tremaine
- Ed Cassidy as Dr. Pronnett
- Eddie Rocco as Bill Slagle
- Charles King as Doc Slagle
- Leon Tyler as Junior

== Soundtrack ==
Original score written by Lee Zahler, performed by MGM studio orchestra

== See also ==
- List of films about horses
- List of films about horse racing
