= The Phantom Speaks =

1945 film by John English

- Theatrical release poster
- Directed by: John English
- Screenplay by: John K. Butler
- Produced by: Donald H. Brown
- Starring: Richard Arlen; Stanley Ridges; Lynne Roberts; Tom Powers; Charlotte Wynters; Jonathan Hale
- Cinematography: William Bradford
- Edited by: Arthur Roberts
- Music by: Edward H. Plumb
- Production company: Republic Pictures
- Distributed by: Republic Pictures
- Release date: May 10, 1945
- Running time: 69 minutes
- Country: United States
- Language: English

The Phantom Speaks is a 1945 American supernatural film noir directed by John English and written by John K. Butler. The film stars Richard Arlen, Stanley Ridges, Lynne Roberts, Tom Powers, Charlotte Wynters and Jonathan Hale. The film was released on May 10, 1945, by Republic Pictures.

== Plot ==
Harvey Bogardus kills a man he believes is having an affair with his wife. After he is sentenced to the electric chair, reporter Matt Fraser is assigned to speak with Dr. Renwick, who is interviewing Bogardus. Matt is dating Renwick's daughter, and agrees. Renwick has a theory that strong-willed souls can survive death, and that Bogardus will do just that. Bogardus is executed. That night, Bogardus' spirit appears and takes over Renwick's mind. "Renwick" shoots and kills the attorney who represented Bogardus at trial, accusing him of incompetence. Matt and the police discover that the attorney was using his dictaphone at the time of his death, and Bogardus' voice is on the machine.

The possessed Renwick then kills Bogardus' wife. Renwick, realizing he has large memory gaps, tries to turn himself in, but Bogardus once more possesses him. "Renwick" now kills a man who was an eyewitness to Bogardus' crime. Bogardus wants Renwick to kill Matt as well as District Attorney Owen McAllister. Renwick attempts suicide, but Bogardus stops him. Matt, thinking Renwick is killing people, goes to McAllister's home to warn him. Matt and McAllister flee in Matt's car, but the possessed Renwick is in the back seat. Matt saves the day, and Renwick is convicted of murder and sentenced to the electric chair.

As Renwick walks to the death chamber, he is still possessed by Bogardus. He speaks in Bogardus' voice, and utters the same last words Bogardus did before his execution. Matt and McAllister, the only witnesses to Bogardus' execution, realize in horror what has happened.

== Cast ==
- Richard Arlen as Matt Fraser
- Stanley Ridges as Dr. Paul Renwick
- Lynne Roberts as Joan Renwick
- Tom Powers as Harvey Bogardus
- Charlotte Wynters as Cornelia Wilmont
- Jonathan Hale as Owen McAllister
- Pierre Watkin as Charlie Davis
- Marion Martin as Betty Hanzel
- Garry Owen as Louis Fabian
- Ralf Harolde as Frankie Teal
- Doreen McCann as Mary Fabian
