= Pirates of the Skies =

Film directed by Joseph A. McDonough

- Theatrical release poster
- Directed by: Joseph A. McDonough
- Screenplay by: Lester Cole; Ben Grauman Kohn
- Story by: Lester Cole
- Produced by: Barney Sarecky
- Starring: Kent Taylor; Rochelle Hudson; Regis Toomey; Marion Martin; Samuel S. Hinds; Ray Walker; Lucien Littlefield
- Cinematography: Jerome Ash
- Edited by: Charles Maynard (Ted Kent credited)
- Production company: Universal Pictures
- Distributed by: Universal Pictures
- Release date: February 3, 1939
- Running time: 60 minutes
- Country: United States
- Language: English

Pirates of the Skies (aka Plane 66) is a 1939 American action film directed by Joseph A. McDonough and written by Lester Cole and Ben Grauman Kohn. The film stars Kent Taylor, Rochelle Hudson, Regis Toomey, Marion Martin, Samuel S. Hinds, Ray Walker and Lucien Littlefield. Pirates of the Skies was released on February 3, 1939, by Universal Pictures.

== Plot ==
Pilot Nick Conlan (Kent Taylor) applies for a job in the State Air Police Force. Known as undisciplined, Nick is warned by Major Smith (Stanley Andrews), the commander, that any infraction of the rules will result in instant dismissal. Nick visits the cafe hangout of the Sky Police, where he encounters waitress Barbara Whitney (Rochelle Hudson), his estranged wife and former stewardess who ignores Nick.

Major Smith and Captain Higgins (Guy Usher) of the State Motor Police are stymied over a series of holdups in their sector. A band of clever crooks seem to have advance information on the movement of large payrolls, bank transfers and jewelry shipments. The secret of their success lies in having access to two locations: the cafe owned by Jerry Petri (Frank Puglia), who has microphones and tape recorders to record pilots, which are sent by carrier pigeon to Dr. Amos Pettingill (Lucien Littlefield), the brains behind the operation and owner of a health spa and pigeon farm.

After each holdup, the robbers, fly to Pettingill's health spa, where they pose as patients. Nick becomes suspicious of the doctor when he lands without orders, at the health spa, spotting several cans of high-test gas.

Nick is fired for disobedience and takes a job flying aircraft for a millionaire sportsman. Meanwhile, Barbara stumbles upon the secret recording room at the cafe and is taken prisoner by Petri. Nick, looking for Barbara at the cafe, discovers the pigeons. Unravelling the secret of the robberies, the major sends his crack pilot, Bill Lambert, (Regis Toomey) to intercept one of the doctor's planes. Nick follows and when Lambert is shot down, Nick calls headquarters and forces the criminal's aircraft down.

With the gang arrested, Nick is reinstated into the Sky Police, and Barbara comes back to him.

== Cast ==
- Kent Taylor as Nick Conlon
- Rochelle Hudson as Barbara Whitney
- Regis Toomey as Pilot Bill Lambert
- Marion Martin as Kitty
- Samuel S. Hinds as Police Commissioner
- Ray Walker as Pilot Hal Weston
- Lucien Littlefield as Dr. Amos Pettingill
- Stanley Andrews as Maj. Smith
- Guy Usher as Police Captain Higgins
- Frank Puglia as Jerry Petri

== Production ==
Under the working title of Plane 66, principal photography on Pirates of the Skies began mid-October and wrapped early November, 1938.

The aircraft in Pirates of the Skies were:

- Fairchild 24C-8C s/n 2664, N14792
- Lockheed Orion 9 s/n 180 NR1222
- Spartan Executive 7-W c/n 14, NC17615

== Reception ==
Although featuring some aerial action, aviation film historian James H, Farmer in Celluloid Wings: The Impact of Movies on Aviation (1984) dismissed Pirates of the Skies as, "a poor second bill offering for the juvenile crowd. In Stephen Pendo's landmark, Aviation in the Cinema (1985), Pirates of the Skies was just another "low-budget actioneer." (Note: Film historian Hugh H. Wynne in The Motion Picture Stunt Pilots and Hollywood's Classic Aviation Movies (1987) noted that Pirates of the Skies was one of a large group of 1930s films where aviation was incidental to the plot, even if the title suggested otherwise.)
