= Roger Davis (film actor) =

American actor (1884–1980)

- Born: January 20, 1884; Maryland, U.S.
- Died: March 3, 1980 (aged 96); Los Angeles, California, U.S.

Roger Davis (January 20, 1884 – March 3, 1980) was an American actor.

== Career ==
Davis was born in Maryland, and played small parts in a number of Hollywood films of the 1920s, 1930s, 1940s and 1950s. They included A Social Celebrity, (1926), Are You There? (1930) and Youth Takes a Fling (1938). He played roles such as butlers and waiters, and appeared in two of the Tracy-Hepburn vehicles, Adam's Rib (1949) and Pat and Mike (1952). Davis died of cancer on March 3, 1980, at the age of 96.
