= They're Always Caught =

1938 film

- Directed by: Harold S. Bucquet
- Written by: John C. Higgins
- Produced by: Jack Chertok
- Starring: Stanley Ridges; John Eldredge
- Music by: Carl W. Stalling
- Distributed by: Metro-Goldwyn-Mayer
- Release date: July 3, 1938
- Running time: 22 minutes
- Country: United States
- Language: English

They're Always Caught is a 1938 American short crime film directed by Harold S. Bucquet and starring Stanley Ridges. It was produced by MGM. In 1939, it was nominated for an Academy Award for Best Live Action Short Film, Two-Reel at the 11th Academy Awards.

== Cast ==
- Stanley Ridges as Doctor John Pritchard
- John Eldredge as Jimmy Stark
- Louis Jean Heydt as Eddie Diesel
- Charles Waldron as Mayor Fletcher
