= Marion Martin =

American actress (1909–1985)

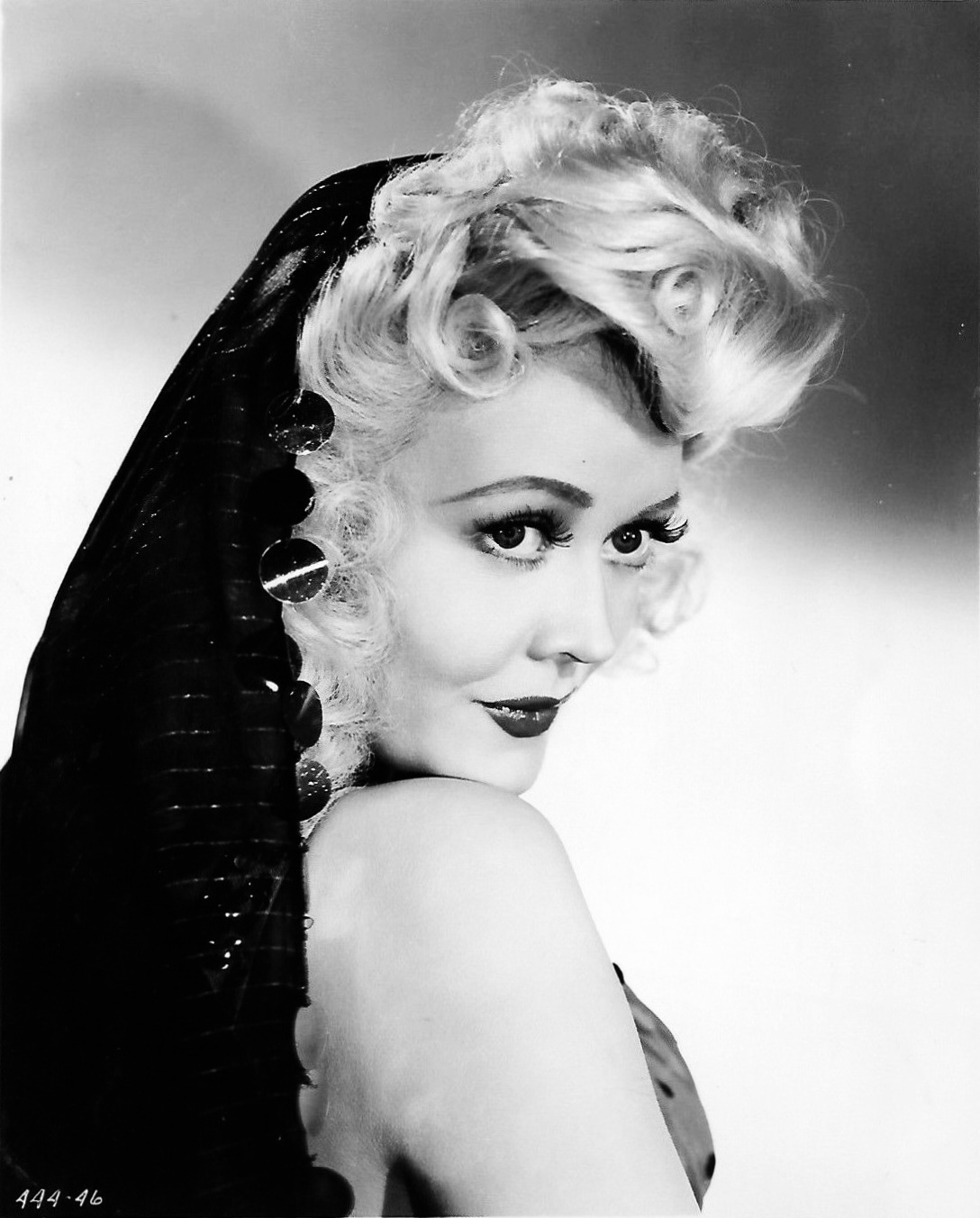
- 1930s Portrait Photo of Martin
- Born: Marion Suplee; June 7, 1909; Philadelphia, Pennsylvania, U.S.
- Died: August 13, 1985 (aged 76); Santa Monica, California, U.S.
- Resting place: Holy Cross Cemetery, Culver City
- Occupation: Actress
- Years active: 1934–1952
- Spouse: Jimmy Krzykowski (1950–1985 (her death)

Marion Suplee (June 7, 1909 – August 13, 1985), known professionally as Marion Martin, was an American film and stage actress.

== Biography ==
Martin was born in Philadelphia, Pennsylvania, the daughter of a Bethlehem Steel executive. She became an actress after her family fortune was lost in the Wall Street crash of 1929, and appeared in the Broadway productions Lombardi Ltd. and Sweet Adeline.

She made her film debut in She's My Lillie, I'm Her Willie and subsequently played minor roles, often as showgirls. Several of her early roles were in musicals, and she achieved some success as a singer. By the end of the decade, she had played leading female roles in several "B" pictures, including one of her most notable roles in James Whale's Sinners in Paradise (1938). Despite her success, she was often cast in minor roles in more widely seen films such as His Girl Friday (1940). Many of her roles were in comedies, but she also appeared in dramas such as Boom Town (1940) in which she played a dance-hall singer who is briefly romanced by Clark Gable. She played secondary roles in three Lupe Vélez "Mexican Spitfire" films in the early 1940s and was a comic foil for the Marx Brothers in The Big Store, where the back of her skirt is cut away by Harpo.

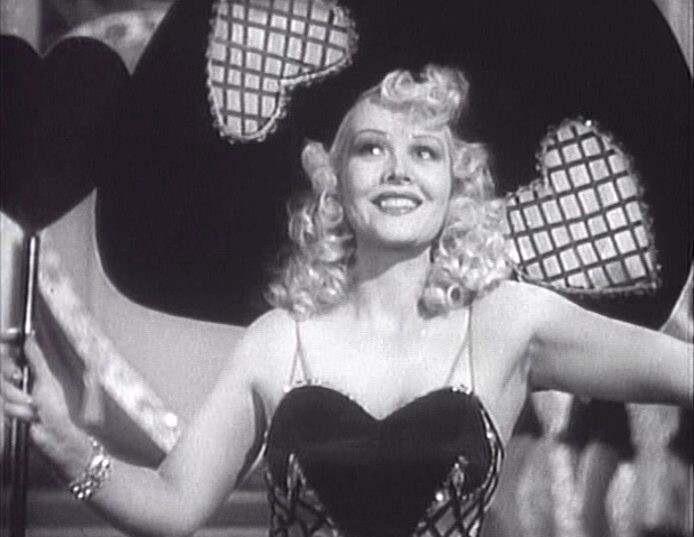
Martin in Lady of Burlesque (1943)

She played a ghost in Gildersleeve's Ghost, and was the subject of a legendary fistfight between Gildersleeve star Harold Peary and Warner Bros. studio mogul Bud Stevens at the Mocambo nightclub in 1943. Her more substantial roles included Alice Angel, a dizzy showgirl, in the murder mystery Lady of Burlesque, with Barbara Stanwyck, and Angel on My Shoulder. She also appeared in The Big Street (1942) with Lucille Ball, in the Western The Woman of the Town with Claire Trevor, and The Great Mike at PRC in 1944.

By the late 1940s, her roles were often minor. Three Stooges fans may remember her as Western cowgirl Gladys in Merry Mavericks. She played Belle Farnol in a 1950 episode of The Lone Ranger entitled "Pardon for Curley". She made her final film appearance in 1952. Married to a physicist, Martin retired, and although she expressed the desire to return to show business, suitable roles were not offered to her.

== Personal ==
She was awarded a star at 6915 Hollywood Boulevard on the Hollywood Walk of Fame for her contributions to motion pictures. She died of cardiac arrest in 1985 in Los Angeles, California, and was buried in Holy Cross Cemetery in Culver City, California.

== Partial filmography ==
- Crime Without Passion (1934) as Theatre Cashier (uncredited)
- Sinners in Paradise (1938) as Iris Compton
- Personal Secretary (1938) as Girl in Office (uncredited)
- Youth Takes a Fling (1938) as Girl on Beach
- The Storm (1938) as Jane, Bar Girl
- His Exciting Night (1938) as Gypsy McCoy
- Pirates of the Skies (1939) as Kitty
- Sergeant Madden (1939) as Charlotte LePage
- Invitation to Happiness (1939) as Lola Snow
- The Man in the Iron Mask (1939) as Mlle. de la Valliere
- Invisible Stripes (1939) as Blonde (uncredited)
- His Girl Friday (1940) as Evangeline (uncredited)
- Women in War (1940) as Starr's Date (uncredited)
- Untamed (1940) as 2nd Girl in Limousine (uncredited)
- Scatterbrain (1940) (uncredited)
- Boom Town (1940) as Whitey
- Ellery Queen, Master Detective (1940) as Cornelia
- Tall, Dark and Handsome (1941) as Dawn
- Blonde Inspiration (1941) as Wanda
- The Lady from Cheyenne (1941) as Gertie (uncredited)
- The Big Store (1941) as Peggy Arden
- Cracked Nuts (1941) as Flashy Blonde in Corridor (uncredited)
- Lady Scarface (1941) as Ruby, aka Mary Jordan
- New Wine (1941) as Mitzi
- Week-End for Three (1941) as Mrs. Weatherby
- The Mexican Spitfire's Baby (1941) as Fifi
- Harvard, Here I Come! (1941) as Oomphie (uncredited)
- Fly-by-Night (1942) as Blond Nurse
- Call Out the Marines (1942) as Pretty Blonde on Tour (uncredited)
- Mexican Spitfire at Sea (1942) as Fifi Russell
- Powder Town (1942) as Sue, Blonde Piano Player
- Tales of Manhattan (1942) as 'Squirrel'
- The Big Street (1942) as Mimi Venus
- Mexican Spitfire's Elephant (1942) as Diana De Corro
- Star Spangled Rhythm (1942) as Wife, Bob Hope Skit (uncredited)
- The McGuerins from Brooklyn (1942) as Myrtle, Marcia's friend
- They Got Me Covered (1943) as Gloria
- Lady of Burlesque (1943) as Alice Angel
- Swingtime Johnny (1943) as Flashy Blonde
- The Woman of the Town (1943) as Daisy Davenport
- Sweethearts of the U.S.A. (1944) as Ghost of Josephine
- It Happened Tomorrow (1944) as Nurse (uncredited)
- Gildersleeve's Ghost (1944) as Terry Vance
- The Merry Monahans (1944) as Soubrette
- Irish Eyes Are Smiling (1944) as Prima Donna (uncredited)
- Mystery of the River Boat (1944, Serial) as Celeste Eltree
- The Great Mike (1944) as Kitty Tremaine
- Eadie Was a Lady (1945) as Rose Allure
- The Phantom Speaks (1945) as Betty Hanzel
- Penthouse Rhythm (1945) as Irma King
- Gangs of the Waterfront (1945) as Rita
- On Stage Everybody (1945) as Bubbles (uncredited)
- Abbott and Costello in Hollywood (1945) as Miss Milbane
- Girls of the Big House (1945) as Dixie
- Cinderella Jones (1946) as Burlesque Queen
- Suspense (1946) as Shooting Gallery Blond (uncredited)
- Deadline for Murder (1946) as Laura Gibson
- Queen of Burlesque (1946) as Lola Cassell
- Black Angel (1946) as Millie
- Angel on My Shoulder (1946) as Mrs. Bentley
- Nobody Lives Forever (1946) as Lou, Blonde (uncredited)
- That Brennan Girl (1946) as Marion, Natalie's Girl Friend
- Lighthouse (1947) as JoJo, The Blonde
- New Orleans (1947) as Blonde Cashier (uncredited)
- That's My Gal (1947) as Pepper
- State of the Union (1948) as Blonde Girl (uncredited)
- Thunder in the Pines (1948) as Pearl
- My Dream Is Yours (1949) as Blonde at Club Babita (uncredited)
- Come to the Stable (1949) as Rossi's Manicurist (uncredited)
- Oh, You Beautiful Doll (1949) as Big Blonde (uncredited)
- Key to the City (1950) as Emmy
- Dakota Lil (1950) as Blonde Singer
- Journey into Light (1951) as Diana
- Oklahoma Annie (1952) as La Belle La Tour (uncredited) (final film role)
