= London Calling (Craig novel) =

2011 bestselling British political crime novel

- Author: James Craig
- Language: English
- Subject: Political crime novel
- Genre: Crime
- Published: London
- Publisher: Constable & Robinson
- Publication date: 2011
- Publication place: United Kingdom
- Pages: 312
- ISBN: 9781849015820
- Dewey Decimal: 823.92
- LC Class: 2010053874

London Calling is a 2011 book by British author James Craig. The book was an E-book bestseller before being published in print.

== Synopsis ==
The novel is set in the lead up to an election. A murderer is on the loose and stalking Edgar Carlton the man set to become Prime Minister. Inspector John Carlyle must track down the killer before Carlton takes the law into his own hands.

== Reception ==
In the Washington Times the book was described as a 'hard-bitten political thriller' while in the Milwaukee Journal-Sentinel the book was praised as a 'pitch-perfect debut'
