= Vivian Cosby =

American writer

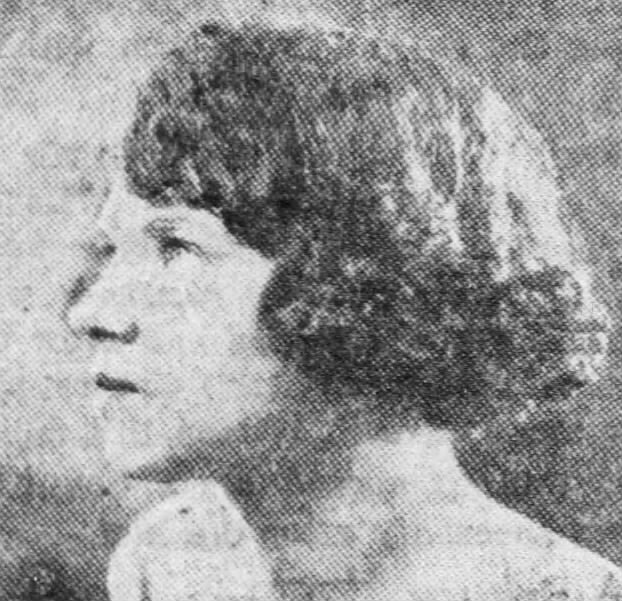
- Cosby c. 1922
- Born: June 6, 1901; Boston, Massachusetts, US
- Died: August 11, 1963 (aged 62); Los Angeles, California, US
- Other name: Vivian Crosby
- Occupations: Playwright; Novelist
- Years active: 1926-1949
- Notable work: Miss Happiness; Trick for Trick; The Pitchman

Vivian L. Cosby (June 6, 1901 – August 11, 1963), also spelled as Vivian Crosby, was an American playwright and novelist who produced scripts for theater and films from the 1920s through the 1940s. A Bostonian, Cosby began appearing in theater and writing plays and musical pieces from a young age. Her works started being adapted for the stage in the 1920s while she joined RKO Radio as a script writer.

Her popular Broadway works, such as Trick for Trick, had multiple Hollywood film studios try to hire her, but she chose to stay in theater and radio production. She was burned in a fire on January 1, 1939, which resulted in her spending three and a half years hospitalized. Her literary output, however, continued during this period and she broadened her connections to celebrities and major organizations from her hospital room. Upon her recovery, she immediately published several new theater scripts and began production work.

== Childhood and education ==
Born as Vivian L. Cosby on June 6, 1901, to Richard Cosby and Susan L. Dodsworth in Boston, Massachusetts, her first appearance in theatre was during a vaudeville dance scene at the age of three. Two years later, she began practicing her acting abilities and learning to play the violin. It wasn't until her teenage years that she started writing plays and singing music, which led to her specializing in writing and producing when she attended Boston University's School of Religious Education. During her time there, she helped produce and coach the members of the university's theater show, along with coaching the Futurists Revue club that played at the Somerville Theatre.

== Career ==
An early work of Cosby's that was turned into a stage musical comedy in 1926 was titled Miss Happiness, and later renamed Open Your Arms. She also wrote the music for the comedy, which was noted by The Evening Journal as helping lift the show "away from the humdrum comedy" that was written by her co-authors. The first play Cosby wrote that was picked up for general production was Just a Pal in 1930, which she made with actress Shirley Warde while Cosby was working as a script writer for RKO Radio. She was featured as one of the "foremost contemporary authors" on RKO's 1936-1937 special features program on the subject, noted for her "distinguished record of stage successes". During this time period, she lived in New York City and became well known for writing the story of the popular play Trick for Trick, alongside co-authors Fulton Oursler and Shirley Warde. Her success on Broadway had multiple Hollywood studios reach out to her for film scripts, but she decided to remain working on theater pieces instead.

On January 1, 1939, Cosby had moved into a new remote home in Beverly Hills, California to work on completing a play script. A safety guard on a gas heater in the bathroom had fallen off and, when she got too close in a long dress, caught herself on fire. The extensive third degree burns required multiple skin grafts and she was hospitalized at St. Vincent's Hospital. Not wanting to stay idle during her recovery she wrote an article for a magazine that attracted a lot of attention, as well as visits from the celebrities discussed in the article. From that point, she turned her hospital room into an impromptu office and began writing radio show scripts, sketches, articles, and assisted actresses she knew to get job offers. During her recovery, she wrote a book named The Pitchman, which had the potential to be turned into a Broadway play. The Pitchman was the first screen writing contract Cosby picked up after her recovery and also the first production for the newly formed Jimmy Dunn Productions, with the story being about spieler presenters. She was pronounced fully recovered after three and a half years, whereupon she immediately signed up for three different screen writing contracts for upcoming films.

When her only surviving relative, her brother Richard Crosby, a magician and band leader died, he left her all his magic and books. Vivian took lessons at Chavez School of Magic and joined the Hollywood Magigals. In December, 1951, she was featured as a magician on the cover of Genii magazine with an article about her written by her friend Joan Crawford.

Vivian's interesting life was featured on Ralph Edward's "This Is Your Life" program.

== Theater ==
- Just a Pal (1930), co-author with Shirley Warde
- Cynthia; or Miss Happiness, a 2-act musical comedy co-written with G. E. Stoddard (1927)
- The Pitchman (1947)

== Filmography ==
- The Mind Reader (1933), original story
- Trick for Trick (1933), co-author
- No Time for Romance (1949)

== Personal life ==
Cosby was engaged to librettist Erving Plummer on April 9, 1922, while both were attending Boston University and working together on the university's theatre production. She died on August 11, 1963, in Hollywood.
