= So This Is London (1930 film) =

1930 film by John G. Blystone

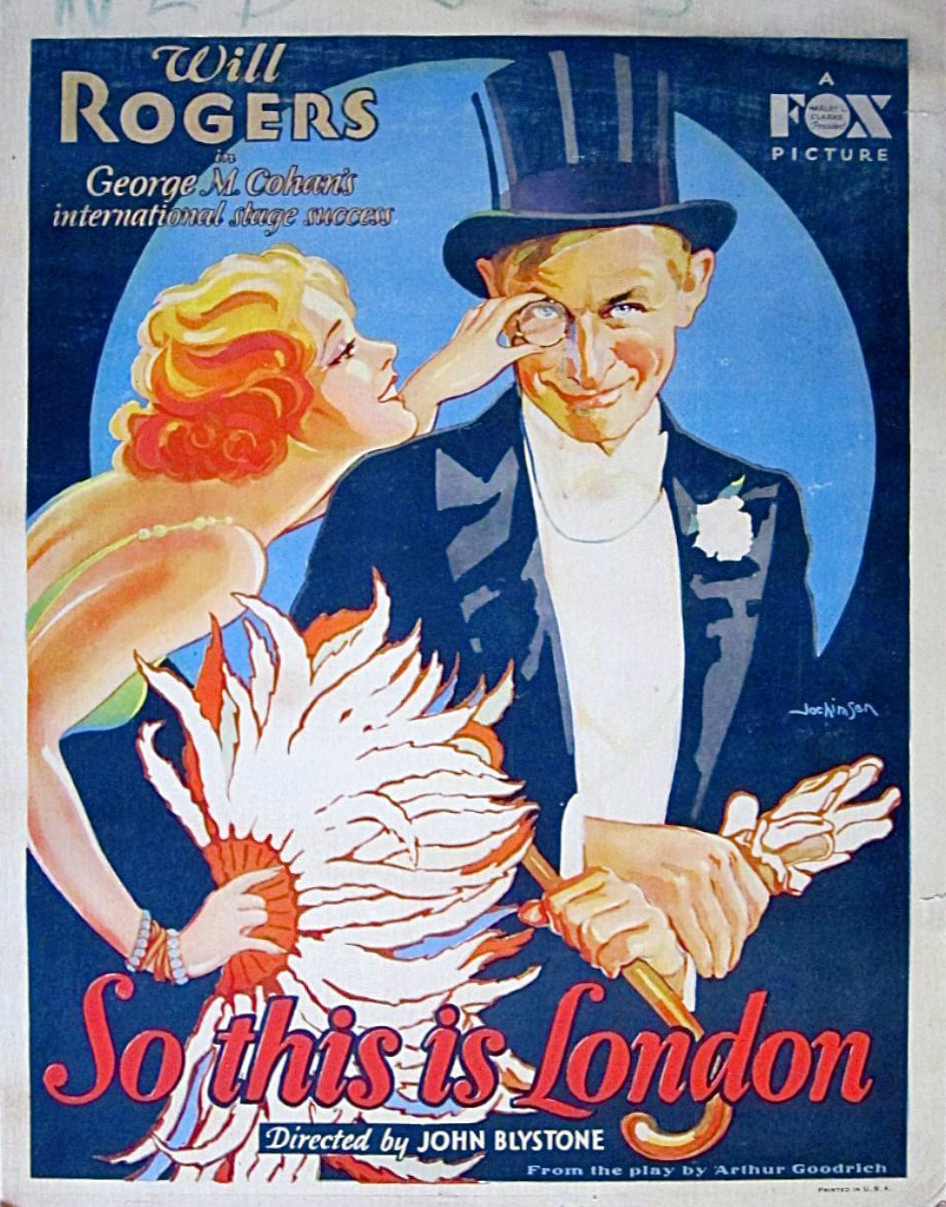
- Window poster featuring Will Rogers
- Directed by: John G. Blystone
- Written by: Sonya Levien; Owen Davis
- Based on: So This Is London by Arthur Goodrich
- Starring: Will Rogers; Irene Rich; Frank Albertson; Maureen O'Sullivan
- Cinematography: Charles G. Clarke
- Edited by: Jack Dennis
- Music by: James F. Hanley
- Production company: Fox Film Corporation
- Distributed by: Fox Film Corporation
- Release date: June 6, 1930
- Running time: 92 minutes
- Country: United States

So This Is London is a 1930 American pre-Code comedy film directed by John G. Blystone and starring Will Rogers, Irene Rich, Frank Albertson and Lumsden Hare.

It was based on the 1922 play So This Is London by Arthur Goodrich, which was adapted again in 1939. An American and an Englishman clash over which country is the greater, while their children have a secret love affair. The plot was relatively similar to They Had to See Paris (1929), a previous film starring Rogers.

== Cast ==
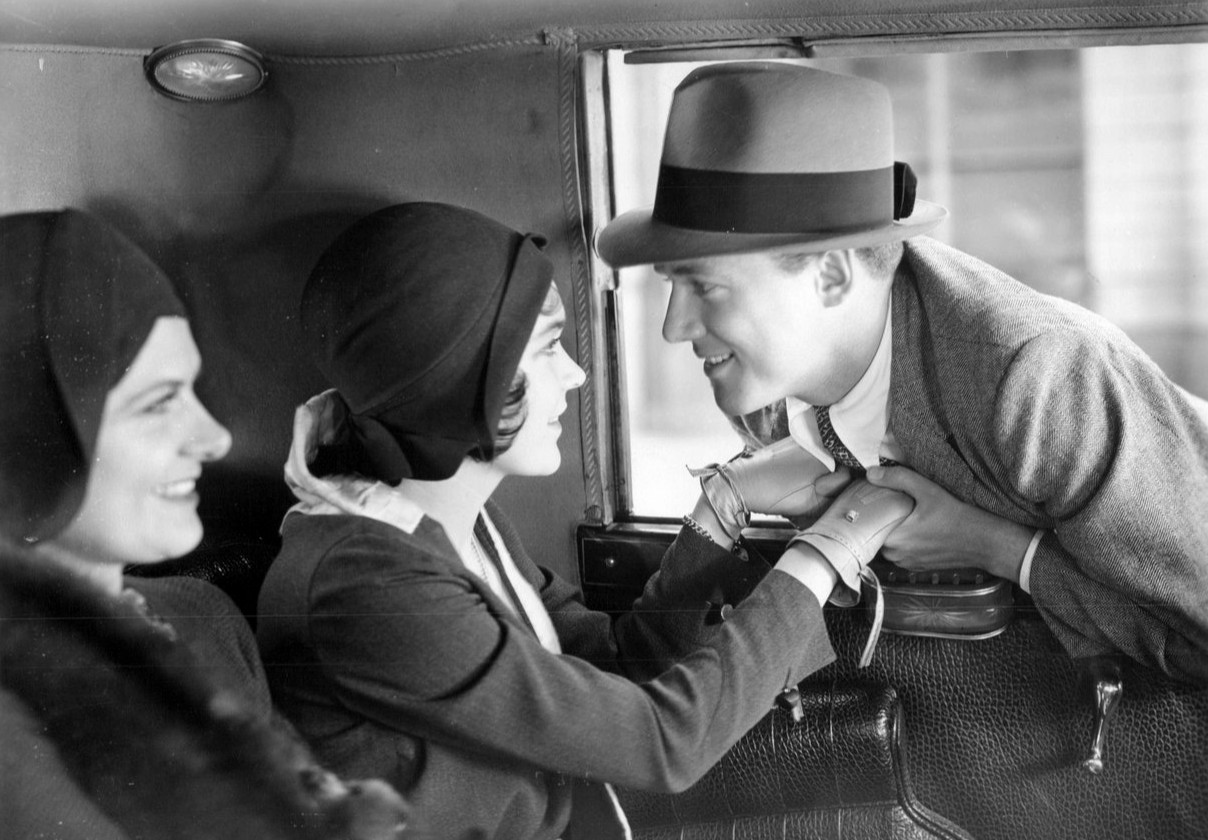
Mary Forbes, Maureen O'Sullivan and Frank Albertson in So This Is London

- Will Rogers as Hiram Draper
- Irene Rich as Mrs Hiram Draper
- Frank Albertson as Junior Draper
- Maureen O'Sullivan as Elinor Worthing
- Lumsden Hare as Lord Percy Worthing
- Mary Forbes as Lady Worthing
- Bramwell Fletcher as Alfred Honeycutt
- Dorothy Christy as Lady Amy Ducksworth
