= Brandon Tynan =

Irish-American actor (1875–1967)

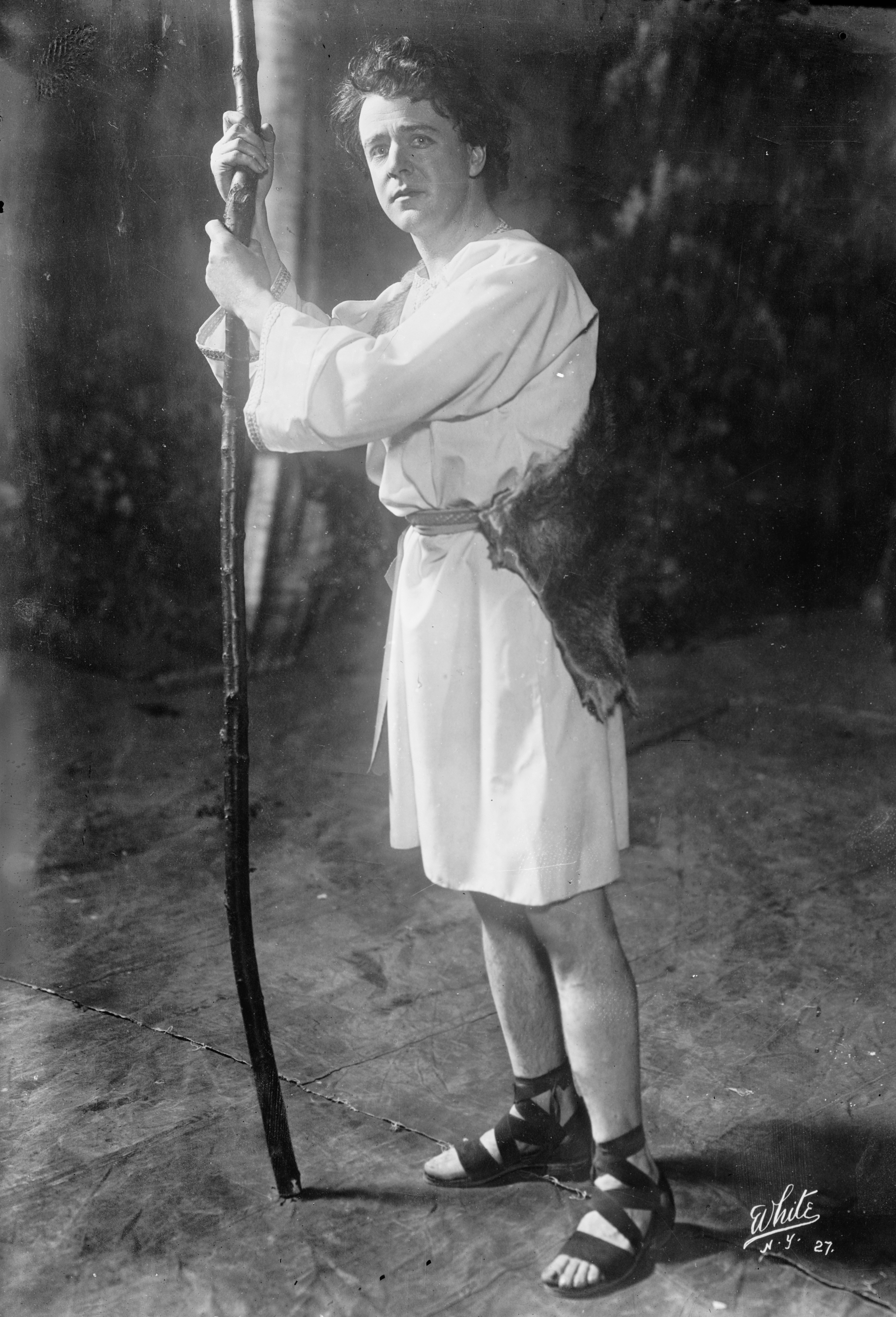
- Born: James William Tynan; April 11, 1875; Dublin, Ireland
- Died: March 19, 1967 (aged 91); New York City, U.S.
- Occupation: Actor
- Years active: 1900–1941
- Spouse(s): Caroline Whyte(died 1918); Lily Cahill

Brandon Tynan (born James William Tynan; April 11, 1875 – March 19, 1967) was an Irish-born American stage and screen actor. In his early stage career he appeared with Alla Nazimova on Broadway in her early years after migrating from Russia. He may have been briefly romantically involved with her. He was married to Caroline Whyte, a daughter of Isadore Rush, who died in 1918 and later to actress Lily Cahill.

Born in Dublin, Tynan appeared in films beginning in 1923 in silents. His last film appearance was in 1941. During his tenure in films he continued to appear in plays until 1936.

Tynan acted on stage in a production of the Ziegfeld Follies, impersonating David Belasco. He also wrote seven plays that were produced. His Broadway debut came in El Gran Galeoto (1899), and he concluded his Broadway work with Three Wise Fools (1936).

Tynan died at the Lynwood Nursing Home in New York on March 19, 1967, aged 91.

== Filmography ==
Year	Title	Role	Notes
1923	Success	Barry Carleton	
1923	Loyal Lives	Dan O'Brien	
1925	Unrestrained Youth	John Powers	
1937	Parnell	Redmond	
1937	Sh! The Octopus	Captain Cobb	
1937	Wells Fargo	Edwards – Newspaper Publisher	
1938	The Girl of the Golden West	The Professor	
1938	Youth Takes a Fling	Tad	
1938	Nancy Drew... Detective	Dr. Raymond 'Ray' Spires	Uncredited
1939	The Great Man Votes	Chester Ainslee	
1939	The Lone Wolf Spy Hunt	Senator Carson	
1939	Almost a Gentleman	Jason Troop	
1939	The Lady and the Mob	Mayor Jones	
1939	Remember?	Judge Sherman	Uncredited
1940	Dr. Ehrlich's Magic Bullet	Doctor	Uncredited
1940	Virginia City	Trenholm	Uncredited
1940	It All Came True	Mr. Van Diver	
1940	Lucky Partners	Mr. Sylvester	
1940	I Want a Divorce	Judge Williams	Uncredited
1940	Rangers of Fortune	Homer Granville Clayborn	
1941	Marry the Boss's Daughter	Mr. Dawson	(final film role)
