= This Is London =

This Is London may refer to:

- thisislondon.co.uk, a website belonging to The Standard (London newspaper)
- "This is London" or "This is London Calling", an opening message on the BBC World Service
- This Is London, a 1983 album by the band The Times
- This Is London, a book in the This Is... travel book series
- "This is London”, the opening phrase of American radio broadcaster Edward R. Murrow’s reports from The Blitz in the early days of World War II

== See also ==
- So This Is London (disambiguation)
