= Stanley Ridges =

English-American actor (1890–1951)

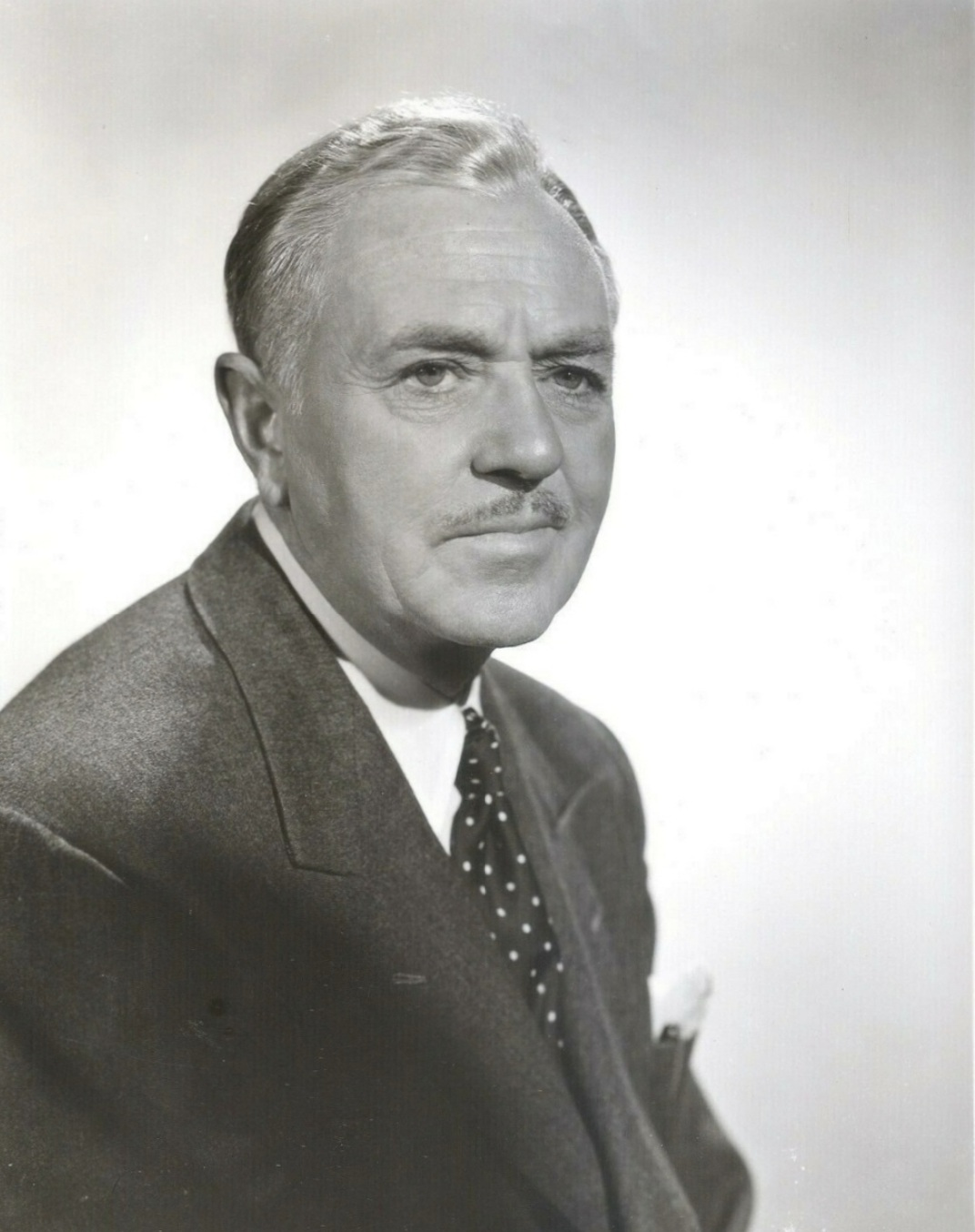
- Ridges in No Way Out (1950)
- Born: Stanley Charles Ridges; 17 July 1890; Southampton, Hampshire, England
- Died: 22 April 1951 (aged 60); Westbrook, Connecticut, U.S.
- Occupation: Actor
- Years active: 1917–1951
- Spouse(s): Anna McGauren (m. 1918; div. 19??) Dorothea C. Crawford (m. 1930)
- Children: 1

Stanley Charles Ridges (17 July 1890 – 22 April 1951) was an English-born American actor who made more than 100 appearances in theatre and movies from 1917 to 1951.

After his American film debut in Success (1923), he appeared in films such as Crime Without Passion (1934), The Scoundrel (1935), If I Were King and The Mad Miss Manton (both 1938), Black Friday (1940), Sergeant York (1941), Wilson (1944) and No Way Out (1950). He also had the starring role in the B-picture False Faces (1943).

== Early life ==
Stanley Charles Ridges was born on 17 July 1890, in Southampton, Hampshire. He later became a protégé of Beatrice Lillie, a star of musical stage comedies, and spent many years learning and honing his craft on the stage.

== Career ==
Eventually making his way to America, Ridges began as a song-and-dance man on Broadway, but later turned to dramatic roles onstage, appearing in such plays as Maxwell Anderson's Mary of Scotland (as Lord Morton) and Valley Forge (as Lieutenant Colonel Lucifer Tench), becoming a romantic leading man.

Ridges' silent film debut was in Success (1923). With his excellent diction and rich voice, he easily made the transition into sound films, with his career taking off at age 43, in Crime Without Passion (1934), with Claude Rains. Ridges found himself cast in character roles, as his greying hair put his romantic leading man days at an end.

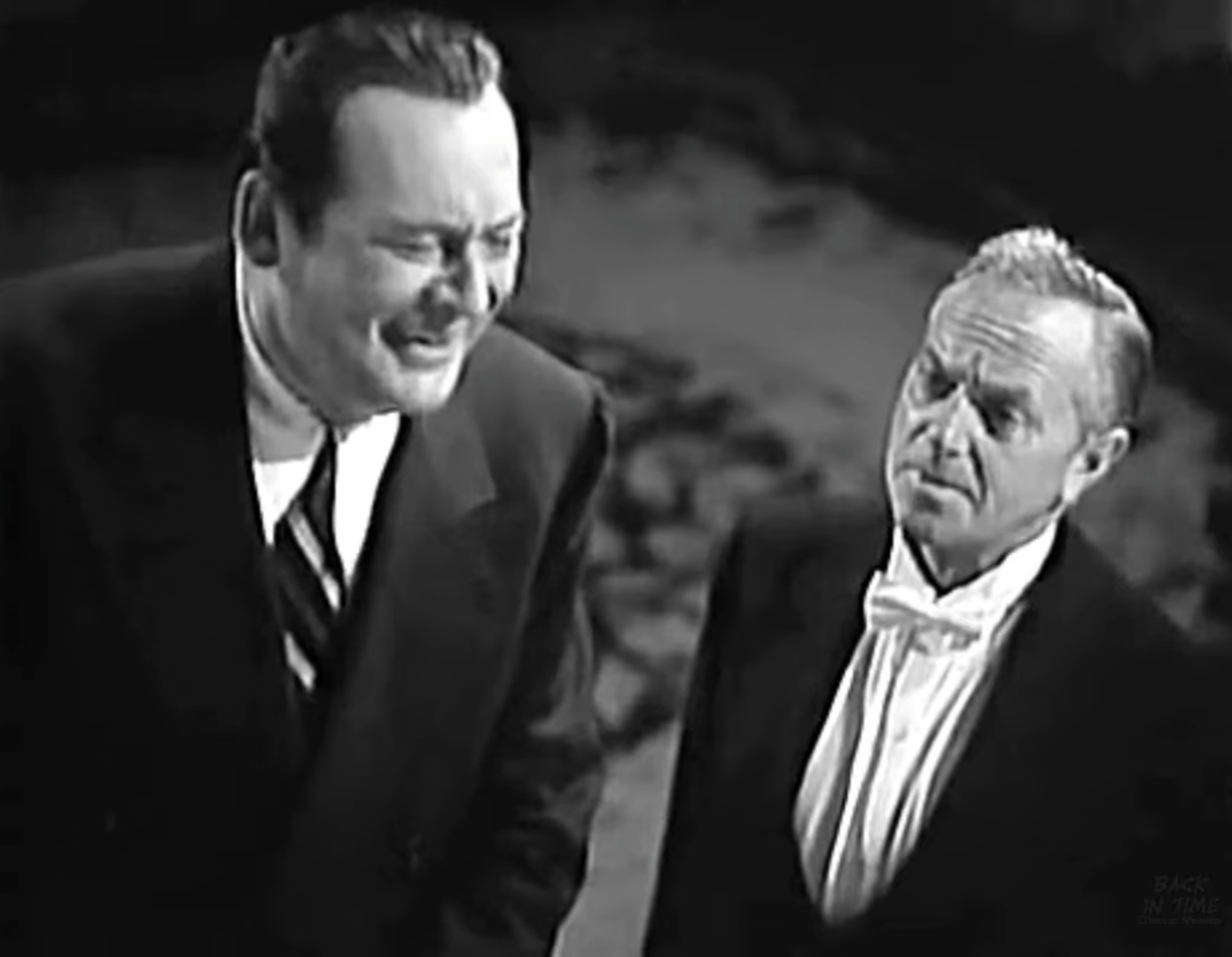
Edward Arnold and Ridges in Eyes in the Night (1942)

His better known roles were probably two different characters in one film, one of them the kindly Professor Kingsley and the other the murderous Red Cannon in the thriller Black Friday (1940). The Jekyll and Hyde transformations gave Ridges a chance to display his acting ability.

Ridges often was cast in supporting roles in many classic films, and played the lead only once, in the B-picture False Faces (1943).

Among Ridges's other film roles were as the Scotland Yard inspector who is shadowing Charles Laughton in the film The Suspect (1944), as Major Buxton (Gary Cooper's commanding officer) in Sergeant York (1941), as Professor Siletsky in To Be or Not to Be (1942), and as Cary Travers Grayson, the official physician for the president in Wilson (1944).

By 1950, he had just begun an appearing in television anthologies such as Studio One and The Philco Television Playhouse. His last feature film, the Ginger Rogers comedy The Groom Wore Spurs, in which he played a mobster, was released a month before he died.

== Death ==
Ridges died 22 April 1951 in Westbrook, Connecticut, aged 60.

== Filmography ==
=== Broadway roles ===
Year	Title	Role	Notes
1933	Mary of Scotland	Lord Morton	
1934	Valley Forge	Lt. Colonel Lucifer Tench	

=== Film ===
Year	Title	Role	Notes
1923	Success	Gilbert Gordon	
1930	The Poor Fish	George	short
1930	Let's Merge		short
1931	For Two Cents	Reporter	
1932	The Sign of the Cross	Chaplain Lloyd	uncredited, his footage was added especially for the 1944 re-release prologue only
1934	Crime Without Passion	Eddie White	
1935	The Scoundrel	Paul Decker	
1936	Winterset	Shadow	
1936	Sinner Take All	MacKelvey	
1937	Internes Can't Take Money	Innes	
1938	Yellow Jack	Dr. James Carroll	
1938	If I Were King	Rene de Montigny	
1938	The Mad Miss Manton	Edward Norris	
1938	They're Always Caught	Dr. John Pritchard	short
1938	There's That Woman Again	Tony Croy	
1939	Let Us Live	District Attorney	
1939	Silver on the Sage	Earl Brennan / Dave Talbot	
1939	Union Pacific	General Casement	
1939	Each Dawn I Die	Meuller	
1939	I Stole a Million	Downs	uncredited
1939	Dust Be My Destiny	Charlie Garrett	
1939	Espionage Agent	Hamilton Peyton	
1939	Nick Carter, Master Detective	Doctor Frankton	
1940	Black Friday	Prof. George Kingsley / Red Cannon	
1941	The Sea Wolf	Johnson	
1941	Mr. District Attorney	District Attorney Tom F. Winton	
1941	Sergeant York	Major Buxton	
1941	They Died with Their Boots On	Major Romulus Taipe	
1942	The Lady Is Willing	Kenneth Hanline	
1942	To Be or Not to Be	Professor Siletsky	
1942	The Big Shot	Martin T. Fleming, Attorney	
1942	Eagle Squadron	Air Minister	
1942	Eyes in the Night	Hansen	
1943	Tarzan Triumphs	Col. von Reichart	
1943	Air Force	Major Mallory	
1943	False Faces	District Attorney Stanley S. Harding	
1943	This is the Army	Maj. John B. Davidson	
1944	The Story of Dr. Wassell	Cmdr. William B. 'Bill' Goggins	
1944	Wilson	Dr. Cary Grayson	
1944	The Master Race	Phil Carson	
1944	The Suspect	Huxley	
1945	God Is My Co-Pilot	Col. Merian 'Steve' Cooper	
1945	The Phantom Speaks	Dr. Paul Renwick	
1945	Captain Eddie	Col. Hans Adamson	
1945	Because of Him	Charles Gilbert	
1946	Canyon Passage	Jonas Overmire	
1946	Mr. Ace	Toomey	
1947	Possessed	Dr. Harvey Willard	
1948	An Act of Murder	Doctor Walter Morrison	
1949	Streets of Laredo	Major Bailey	
1949	You're My Everything	Mr. Henry Mercer	
1949	Task Force	Sen. Bentley`	
1950	The File on Thelma Jordon	Kingsley Willis	
1950	Paid in Full	Dr. P.J. 'Phil' Winston	
1950	No Way Out	Dr. Sam Moreland	
1950	The Du Pont Story	Gen. Henry du Pont	
1951	The Groom Wore Spurs	Harry Kallen	final film role
