= Lily Cahill =

American actress

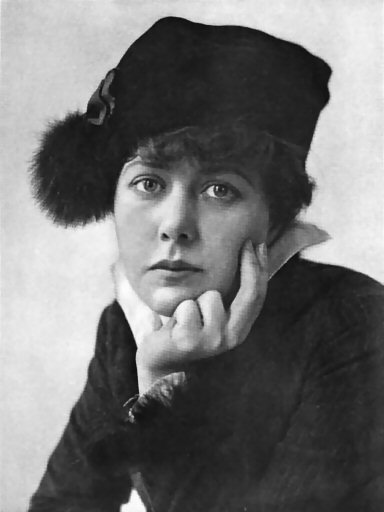
- Cahill in 1914
- Born: July 17, 1888; Lockhart, Texas, U.S.
- Died: June 20, 1955 (aged 66); San Antonio, Texas, U.S.
- Occupation: Actress
- Years active: 1910–1953
- Spouse: Brandon Tynan

Lily Cahill (July 17, 1888 – July 20, 1955) was an American stage and screen actress.

== Early life ==
Lily Cahill was born July 17, 1888, in San Antonio, Texas. She was the granddaughter of Confederate Army Colonel John Jacob Myers.

== Career ==
She began her career in 1910 at the age of 15 playing supporting roles in several silent films directed by D.W. Griffith. In 1911 she was given leading parts in A Victim of Circumstances and The Failure.

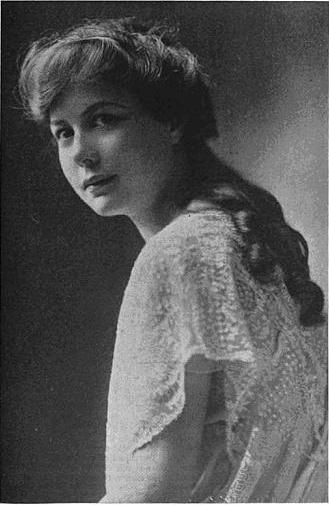
Actress Lily Cahill, ca. 1914, National Magazine

In 1912 Cahill abandoned her movie career for the stage, making her Broadway debut in the short-lived play The Road to Arcady by Edith Sessions Tupper. She remained highly active in the New York theatre scene up through 1941. Some of her notable appearances are:

- Roi Cooper Megrue's Under Cover (1914)
- Brandon Tynan's The Melody of Youth (1916)
- Henri Lavedan's The Marquis de Priola (1919)
- Matheson Lang's The Purple Mask (1920)
- Owen Davis's Opportunity (1920)
- Arthur Goodrich's So This Is London (1922)
- Jesse Lynch Williams's Lovely Lady (1925)
- Sil-Vara's Caprice (1928)
- Rachel Crothers's As Husbands Go (1931)
- Sidney Howard's Alien Corn (1933)
- S. N. Behrman's Rain From Heaven (1934)
- George S. Kaufman's First Lady (1935)
- Howard Lindsay and Russel Crouse's Life With Father (1941)

She also made appearances on the London stage and was active in regional theatre both in the Northeast United States and in her native Texas. Cahill returned periodically to films during her career, appearing in Colonel Carter of Cartersville (1915), My Sin (1931), and So This Is London (1939). She also appeared in one episode of the television series The Philco Television Playhouse in 1953.

== Personal life ==
She was briefly married to Irish-born American actor Brandon Tynan.
