= So This Is London (1939 film) =

- Directed by: Thornton Freeland
- Screenplay by: Tom Phipps; Ben Travers; William M. Conselman; Douglas Furber
- Based on: play So This Is London by Arthur Goodrich
- Produced by: Robert Kane
- Starring: Robertson Hare; Alfred Drayton; George Sanders; Berton Churchill
- Cinematography: Otto Kanturek
- Edited by: James B. Clark
- Music by: Bretton Byrd
- Production company: Fox-British
- Distributed by: Twentieth Century Fox
- Release dates: March 1939 (UK); 3 May 1940 (USA)
- Running time: 70 minutes
- Country: United Kingdom
- Language: English

So This Is London is a 1939 British comedy film directed by Thornton Freeland and starring Robertson Hare, Alfred Drayton and George Sanders. It was written by Tom Phipps, Ben Travers, William M. Conselman and Douglas Furber adapted from the 1922 play So This Is London by Arthur Goodrich which had previously been adapted into a 1930 film. It was made at Pinewood Studios by 20th Century Fox's British subsidiary.

An American clashes with an Englishman over the merits of their respective countries, only to find that their children have fallen in love.

== Preservation status ==
The British Film Institute National Archive holds a collection of ephemera and stills but no film or video materials.

== Plot ==
Lord Worthing of British Bakeries, Ltd., and Hiram Draper of American Bread Incorporated, aim to jointly acquire a Vitamin B4 flour formula. Worthing’s solicitor, Henry Honeycutt, is tasked with gathering all parties, including the formula's inventor Dr. Dereski, under one roof. He succeeds, but chaos erupts when Dereski falls for Henry's wife and is exposed as an impostor. Henry ultimately unmasks the fraud, and the Anglo-American business deal is sealed when Worthing’s son marries Draper’s daughter.

== Cast ==
- Robertson Hare as Henry Honeycutt
- Alfred Drayton as Lord Worthing
- George Sanders as Doctor de Reseke
- Berton Churchill as Hiram Draper
- Fay Compton as Lady Worthing
- Carla Lehmann as Elinor Draper
- Stewart Granger as Laurence
- Lily Cahill as Mrs. Draper
- Mavis Clair as Mrs. Honeycutt
- Ethel Revnell as Dodie
- Gracie West as Liz

== Critical reception ==
The Monthly Film Bulletin wrote: "The direction continually alternates between the comic and the pseudo-serious, never quite making up its mind – even about the title, So This is London. There is not really a glimpse of it."

Kine Weekly wrote: " Here we have a broad, breezy, but, at times, sprawling essay in Anglo-American business and domestic relationships. Alfred Drayton and Robertson Hare make the most of Ben Travers' lines – little more than the title remains of George M. Cohan's original stage farce – but Revnell and West, the B.B.C. stars, are out of their element. Still, although burdened with superfluous slapstick by-play, the film has the capacity to amuse the crowd; its strength is its wholesome ribaldry."

Variety wrote: "London has so many screamingly funny slapstick situations that indications are it will be an entertainment bonanza in this country. George M. Cohan's original stage comedy has been converted to suit the personalities of Alfred Drayton and Robertson Hare, English farceurs, and their craftsmanship is worthy. The characters are good to meet, the dialog is crisp and pungent, direction good and photography excellent."

TV Guide gave the film two out of four stars, and commented, "Clair, in a minor role, gets in a few laughs as a sleepwalker."
