= Shirley Warde =

American writer and actress

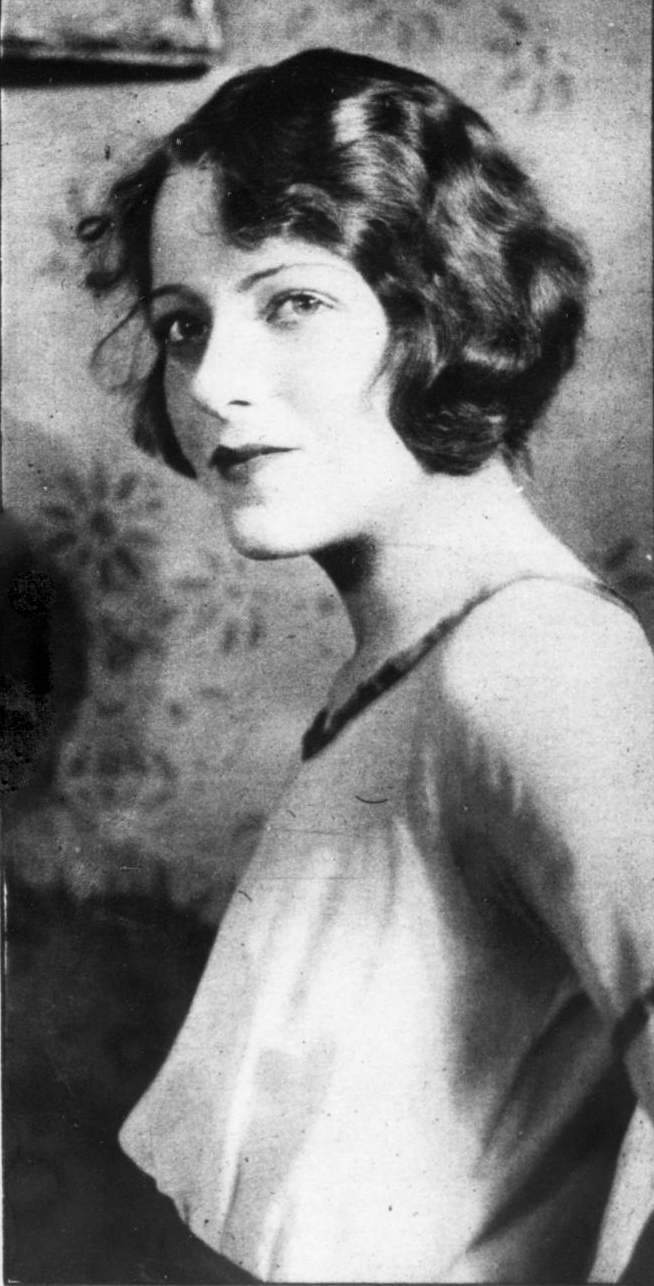
- Warde c. 1921
- Born: January 23, 1901; Washington Heights, Manhattan, United States
- Died: October 1991 (aged 90); Belize City, Belize
- Occupations: Actress; Playwright
- Years active: 1917–1965
- Notable work: Smooth as Silk (actress); Deep Yellow (actress); Trick for Trick (writer)
- Children: 1

Shirley Warde (January 23, 1901 – October 1991) was an American actress and playwright who starred in theater productions throughout the 1910s through the 1930s, movie productions from the 1930s through the 1940s, and produced theater and radio play scripts for most of her life from the 1920s onwards. Born and raised in New York City, she attended the Ethical Culture School for theater from a young age and began starring in shows even while still a teenager. She received multiple female lead character roles and was well known for her ambition to produce and direct theater as well.

While publishing short stories in popular magazines, Warde also began focusing more on script writing, officially abandoning theater in 1934 to move into radio production. This also led her to join the Writers' War Board during World War II. Throughout her adult life, she also heavily participated in the Baháʼí Faith, eventually traveling to Belize in the 1960s as a missionary and deciding to remain there as a local playwright.

== Career ==
Born in Washington Heights, Manhattan, Warde first began acting at the age of six when she put together a self-written play for her Ethical Culture School. At the drama school, she was taught by Ada Currier and worked on writing several plays in addition to acting. Her official debut was at fourteen in the cast of The Merry Wives of Windsor production at the Criterion Theatre. The theatre roles she had available expanded afterwards, leading to her having a major position in The Music Master and a series of stock company performances in the years following at the theater she personally opened and organized. Her follow-up major casting was as the female lead in Smooth as Silk. The play's massive success facilitated her lead positions in most productions afterwards, such as playing the "wicked woman" in the 1926 production of Yellow.

At the same time, she also had her own thoughts about plays and began writing pieces of plots and scripts in her free time, constantly carrying a notepad and pencil whenever she left home. She stated in a 1922 interview with The Boston Globe that she strongly desired to become a theater producer and be involved in every part of production, including choosing the cast and the sets, even directing. In 1924, she submitted her play script for What's the Use to a best American screenwriter competition. Rupert Hughes suggested to her in 1927 that she take her notes and put together full stories that could be submitted to magazines, which she started doing with her short stories in publications such as Nash's Magazine and Cosmopolitan.

By that time, she had also finished writing two full plays, which had already seen use by the stock company she had created in years prior. The manuscripts were being considered for full theatre production by separate theater managers in 1927. One of her stories was later in 1929 chosen for production in Samuel Goldwyn's talkies and Warde began working on a novel about theatrical life with Vivien Crosby as her co-author. During the same time period when she published her short story The Economist in the New York Daily News in 1934, Warde had officially quit acting and moved into radio broadcasting.

Warde joined the commercial production department of the Columbia Broadcasting Company in 1934 and was noted by Peter Dixon in The World-News as having made "a reputation as one of the most skillful producers and directors in radio." She ended up being writer and assistant producer for the Charlie McCarthy radio show. After the United States entered into World War II, she joined the Writers' War Board and began producing radio plays for the war effort.

== Theater ==
=== Writer ===
- What's the Use, a play in a prologue (1925)
- Just a Pal (1930)
- The Queen at Home (1930)
- What Could The Poor Girl Do (1931)
- Trick for Trick (1932)
- The Boss King (1965), reprised in 1976

=== Actress ===
- The Merry Wives of Windsor
- The Music Master (1917)
- All The King's Horses (1919)
- Aphrodite (1920) as Moussarian
- Smooth as Silk (1921) as Boots Carrola
- The Goose Hangs High (1924) as Dagmar Carroll
- The Cat and the Canary (1925)
- The Old Soak (1925)
- Kick In (1925)
- The Green Beetle (1926)
- Deep Yellow (1926) as Daisy Lingard
- Money From Home (1927) as Jennie Patrick
- Blood Money (1927) as Julie Jones
- Among the Married (1927)
- Red Dust (1928)
- The Lady Lies (1928) as Joyce Roamer
- House Unguarded (1929) as Laura Thorne
- Maggie the Magnificent (1929) as Margaret
- The First Mrs. Fraser (1933) as the second Mrs. Fraser

== Radio ==
=== Writer ===
- Little Cog (1942)
- All Out for Davy (1943)

== Filmography ==
- The Secret of Dr. Kildare (1939)
- Murder Over New York (1940) as Mrs. Felton
- We Who Are Young (1940)
- The Devil Commands (1941) as Helen Blair

== Personal life ==
During her theatre years, Warde lived in an apartment next to Central Park so she could engage in her hobby of horse riding. She married Reginald Warde and they had a daughter together. But she filed for divorce in September 1925, citing his abandonment of the family on July 26, 1925. In March 1927, Warde inherited her late uncle's horse farm in Mansfield, Wyoming and its 500 horses. She planned to not only breed more Blue Ribbon winning saddle horses, but also organized with New York City mayor Jimmy Walker to have some of the horses be used in Central Park and in summer camps so children could enjoy them.

Warde was a member of the Baháʼí Faith and frequently attended the annual public conference. She later became an expatriate to Belize as a missionary for the Baháʼí Faith in the 1960s and stayed longer than expected to produce local plays.

== See also ==
- Belizean Writers Series
