= Richard Macaulay =

American screenwriter

Richard Macaulay (1909–1969) was an American screenwriter. He wrote a number of films with Jerry Wald while under contract to Warner Bros.

He was a noted anti-Communist and was a member of the Motion Picture Alliance for the Preservation of American Ideals. He testified to Congress in 1947 and gave names of writers in the Writers Guild who he believed were communists.

He was survived by a wife and two daughters.

== Selected filmography ==
- Husband's Holiday (1935) – short
- Front Page Woman (1935)
- A Natural Born Salesman (1936) a.k.a. Earthworm Tractors
- Polo Joe (1936)
- When's Your Birthday (1937) (uncredited)
- All Is Confusion (1937)
- Ready, Willing and Able (1937)
- Melody for Two (1937)
- Varsity Show (1937)
- Hollywood Hotel (1938)
- Gold Diggers in Paris (1938)
- Hard to Get (1938)
- Going Places (1938)
- Garden of the Moon (1938)
- Brother Rat (1938)
- The Kid from Kokomo (1939)
- The Roaring Twenties (1939)
- On Your Toes (1939)
- Naughty But Nice (1939)
- Three Cheers for the Irish (1940)
- Brother Rat and a Baby (1940)
- Brother Orchid (1940) (uncredited)
- Baby Be Good (1940)
- Torrid Zone (1940)
- They Drive by Night (1940)
- Flight Angels (1940)
- Out of the Fog (1941)
- Navy Blues (1941)
- Million Dollar Baby (1941)
- Manpower (1941)
- Captains of the Clouds (1942)
- Wings for the Eagles (1942)
- Across the Pacific (1942)
- Tampico (1944)
- Young Widow (1946)
- Rookies Come Home (1947)
- Born to Kill (1947)
- Cosmopolitan Theatre (1951) – episode "The Secret Front"
- The Good Die Young (1954) – origina novel
- 77 Sunset Strip (1958) – episode "Vicious Circule"
- Perry Mason (1959) – episode "The Case of the Caretaker's Cat"
- Troubleshooters (1959) – episode "Downrange"
- Maverick (1959) – episode "Downrange"
- The Gallant Men (1963) – episode "The Warriors"
