= Jerry Wald =

American screenwriter and producer (1911–1962)

- Born: Jerome Irving Wald; September 16, 1911; New York City, New York, U.S.
- Died: July 13, 1962 (aged 50); Beverly Hills, California, U.S.
- Education: New York University
- Occupations: Screenwriter, film producer, radio producer
- Years active: 1932–1962
- Spouse(s): Constance M. Polan (1941–1962; his death; 2 children)

Jerome Irving Wald (September 16, 1911 – July 13, 1962) was an American screenwriter and producer of film and radio. He was twice nominated for the Academy Award for Best Picture, for Peyton Place (1957) and Sons and Lovers (1960), and received the Irving G. Thalberg Memorial Award in 1949.

== Life and career ==
=== Early life ===
Born to a Jewish family in Brooklyn, New York, he had a brother and sons who were active in show business. He attended James Madison High School.

He began writing a radio column for the New York Evening Graphic, while studying journalism at New York University. This led to him producing several Rambling 'Round Radio Row featurettes for Vitaphone, Warner Brothers' short subject division (1932–33).

=== Screenwriter ===
Wald's first feature credit was for the Warners movie Twenty Million Sweethearts (1934); he provided the story along with Paul Finder Moss at Warners. Wald provided the story (along with Philip Epstein) for Universal's Gift of Gab (1934).

Wald then signed with Warners where would be based for many years. He worked on the script for Maybe It's Love (1935) and the Rudy Vallée musical Sweet Music (1935).

==== Julius Epstein ====
Wald worked on a series of scripts with Julius J. Epstein: the drama Living on Velvet (1935); In Caliente (1935); Broadway Gondolier (1935) (both uncredited); Little Big Shot (1935); Stars Over Broadway (1935); I Live for Love (1935); and Sons o' Guns (1936) with Joe E. Brown.

Other writers with whom Wald regularly worked were Sig Herzig and Warren Duff who were both on Sing Me a Love Song (1937).

==== Richard Macaulay ====
Wald worked on Ready, Willing and Able (1937) based on a story by Richard Macaulay. Wald, Macaulay, Duff and Herzig worked on Varsity Show (1937). Wald did some work on Ever Since Eve (1937).

Wald and Macaulay collaborated on scripts for Hollywood Hotel (1937); The Gay Impostors (1938) for Vallée; Garden of the Moon (1938); Brother Rat (1938), based on the hit play; and Hard to Get (1938) with Dick Powell.

Wald and Herzig were among the writers on Going Places (1938) with Powell. He and Macaulay worked on The Kid from Kokomo (1939), from a story by Dalton Trumbo; Naughty But Nice (1939) for Powell; and On Your Toes (1939).

Wald and Macaulay had both mostly worked on musicals but they had a big hit with the gangster film The Roaring Twenties (1939), with James Cagney and Humphrey Bogart, co-written with Robert Rossen.

They worked on Brother Rat and a Baby (1939) (uncredited); 3 Cheers for the Irish (1940), a comedy; Torrid Zone (1940), with Cagney and Ann Sheridan; Flight Angels (1940); Brother Orchid (1940); They Drive by Night (1940) with George Raft and Bogart; Million Dollar Baby (1941), a comedy co written with Casey Robinson; Out of the Fog (1941) with Lupino, working with Rossen; Manpower (1941) with Raft, Edward G Robinson and Marlene Dietrich.

=== Producer ===
Wald was promoted to producer at the recommendation of Mark Hellinger. His first credit was Navy Blues (1941), which he also wrote with Macaulay.

Wald was associate producer on The Man Who Came to Dinner (1941), adapted by the Epsteins; All Through the Night (1942), with Bogart; Larceny, Inc. (1942) with Robinson; and Juke Girl (1942) with Sheridan and Ronald Reagan.

Wald was promoted to full producer, and soon established himself as one of the leading filmmakers on the lot: Across the Pacific (1942), with Bogart and director John Huston, written by Macaulay; George Washington Slept Here (1942) and The Hard Way (1943); he also contributed to the story of the latter, but had effectively given up writing.

Wald went on to produce Action in the North Atlantic (1943) with Bogart; Background to Danger (1943) with Raft; Destination Tokyo (1943) with Cary Grant and directed by Delmer Daves; In Our Time (1944) with Lupino; The Very Thought of You (1944) with Dennis Morgan and Eleanor Parker; Objective, Burma! (1945) with Errol Flynn; and Pride of the Marines (1945) with John Garfield.

Wald produced Joan Crawford's first film at Warners, Mildred Pierce (1945) which won her an Oscar and earned Wald an Oscar Nomination for Best Picture. He did her next film, Humoresque (1946), written by Clifford Odets and directed by Jean Negulesco.

Wald produced The Unfaithful (1947) with Ann Sheridan and director Vincent Sherman; Possessed (1947) with Crawford; Dark Passage (1947) with Bogart and Lauren Bacall for Daves; and To the Victor (1948) with Morgan and Dves.

He produced a series of classic films: Key Largo (1948) with Bogart, Bacall and Edward G. Robinson; Johnny Belinda (1948), which won an Oscar for star Jane Wyman; and Adventures of Don Juan (1948) with Flynn.

Wald's credits then included One Sunday Afternoon (1949), with Morgan; John Loves Mary (1949) with Ronald Reagan; Flamingo Road (1949) with Crawford; Daves' Task Force (1949) with Gary Cooper; Always Leave Them Laughing (1949) with Milton Berle; and The Inspector General (1949) with Danny Kaye.

Wald produced Young Man with a Horn (1950) with Kirk Douglas; Perfect Strangers (1950) with Morgan and Ginger Rogers; Sherman's The Damned Don't Cry (1950) with Crawford; Caged (1950), with Eleanor Parker; the first adaptation of The Glass Menagerie (1950); The Breaking Point (1950), from a Hemingway novel, with Garfield; and Storm Warning (1951), an anti-Ku Klux Klan film with Rogers, Reagan and Doris Day.

His story, Hot Air shot as Twenty Million Sweethearts (1934), was filmed as the Doris Day musical My Dream Is Yours (1949).

=== Wald-Krasna Productions ===
Wald and Norman Krasna formed Wald/Krasna Productions to release films through RKO Radio Pictures. Howard Hughes reportedly paid Warners $150,000 to release Wald from his contract with them. They were to make 12 films a year for five years with a budget of $50 million.

Their movies together included Two Tickets to Broadway (1951), a musical; The Blue Veil (1951), with Jane Wyman; Behave Yourself! (1952), a comedy with Shelley Winters; The Lusty Men (1952), a rodeo drama with Robert Mitchum; and Clash by Night (1953), from a play by Clifford Odets. Wald did some uncredited producing on Macao (1952) with Robert Mitchum.

Krasna and Wald dissolved their partnership because of interference from Howard Hughes, then head of RKO, in their productions.

=== Columbia ===
Wald went to Columbia in 1952 as vice president in charge of production.

At Columbia he produced Miss Sadie Thompson (1953) starring Rita Hayworth; Queen Bee (1955) with Crawford, directed by Ranald MacDougall; The Harder They Fall (1956), Bogart's last movie; and The Eddy Duchin Story (1957), a biopic with Tyrone Power and Kim Novak.

=== Jerry Wald Productions at 20th Century Fox ===
Wald signed a contract with 20th Century Fox where he established Jerry Wald Productions. He had a solid hit with An Affair to Remember (1957) starring Grant and Deborah Kerr, and some minor ones with No Down Payment (1957) directed by Martin Ritt, and Kiss Them for Me (1957) with Grant. Wald had one of the biggest successes of his career with Peyton Place (1957), directed by Mark Robson.

Wald also produced The Long, Hot Summer (1958) with Paul Newman and Joanne Woodward from the novel by William Faulkner for Ritt; In Love and War (1958), a war film with Robert Wagner and Jeffrey Hunter directed by Philip Dunne; Mardi Gras (1958) a musical with Pat Boone; and The Sound and the Fury (1959), more Faulkner from Ritt with Woodward and Yul Brynner.

During this time Wald told the press that a filmmaker's motto should be "Don't offend the innocent but don't frustrate the intelligent."

Wald produced The Best of Everything (1959) with Crawford, directed by Negulesco; Hound-Dog Man (1959), an attempt to make a film star of Fabian Forte; Beloved Infidel (1959) with Kerr and Gregory Peck; The Story on Page One (1959), written and directed by Odets, starring Hayworth.

=== Final films ===
Wald spent a period in England to make Sons and Lovers (1960). Back in Hollywood he produced Let's Make Love (also 1960), Marilyn Monroe's penultimate film; Return to Peyton Place (1961); Wild in the Country (1961), an Elvis Presley film written by Odets and directed by Dunne; Mr. Hobbs Takes a Vacation (1962) starring James Stewart and Fabian; Hemingway's Adventures of a Young Man (1962) for Ritt with Richard Beymer; The Stripper (1963) with Woodward and Beymer.

He also produced the Academy Awards telecast twice, the ceremonies for 1957 and 1958.

In July 1961 Wald's contract with Fox was expanded from ten films over three years to 18 films over three years, starting in September. Films announced included Adventures of A Young Man, Mr. Hobbs Takes A Vacation, The Enemy Within, Lost Girl, Ulysses, the remake of Of ‘Human Bondage, Let It Come Down, Sextette, Pink Tights and High Wind in Jamaica.

Among the films Wald was working on at the time of his death were adaptations of The Enemy Within, Ulysses and A High Wind in Jamaica.

== Impact ==
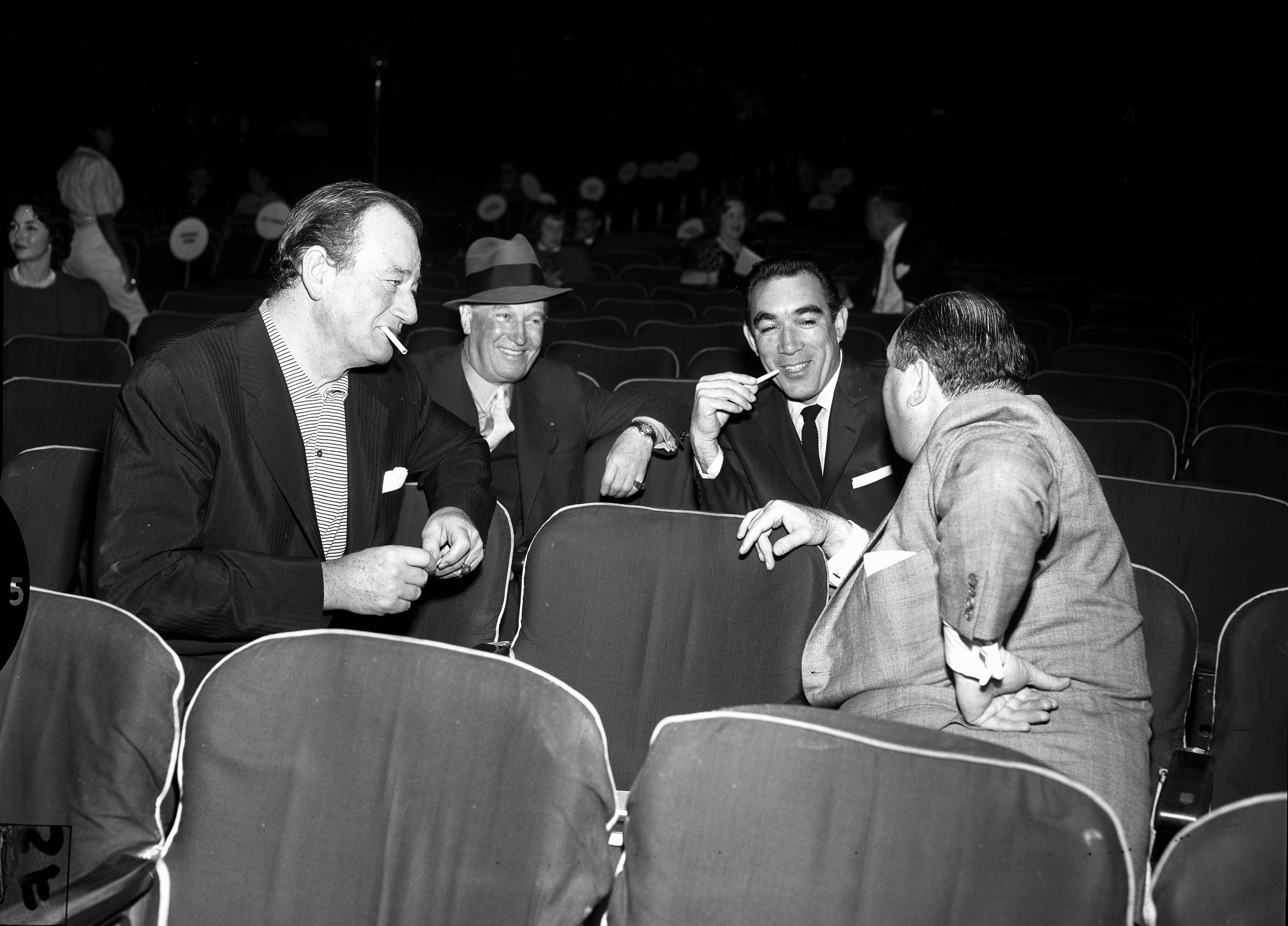
Wald (far right, facing away from camera) during rehearsals for the 1958 Academy Awards, with John Wayne, Maurice Chevalier and Anthony Quinn.

Wald is often cited as the real-life inspiration for the character Sammy Glick in the novel What Makes Sammy Run by Budd Schulberg although Schulberg himself denied this.

Jerry Wald, was a close friend of Joan Crawford in the forties, offering her many parts including the title role in Mildred Pierce, which he produced. He convinced director Michael Curtiz that she would succeed in the role, which brought her the Oscar for Best Actress in 1946. Jerry Wald not only produced Mildred Pierce, but also Humoresque (1946), considered one of the best performances of Crawford's career, Across the Pacific (1942), The Man Who Came to Dinner (1942), Possessed (1947), Flamingo Road (1949), The Damned Don't Cry (1950). After his career at Warner's fizzled out slowly even though he wished to remain with the studio, he bought out his contract.

He is alleged to have responded, when asked why he attended Harry Cohn's funeral, “Just to be sure the bastard was dead”

== Personal life ==
Wald married his wife Constance Emily "Connie" Polan (née Polan) on Christmas Day 1941; the couple had two sons. She became a California socialite and hostess whose dinner parties, frequented by her friend Audrey Hepburn, continued after her husband died.

=== Death ===
Wald had been ill for the last few years of his life, suffering three heart attacks. He died, aged 50, at his home in Beverly Hills, California from a heart attack.

== Partial filmography ==
=== Screenwriter ===
- Twenty Million Sweethearts (1934)
- Gift of Gab (1934)
- Living on Velvet (1935)
- I Live for Love (1935)
- Maybe It's Love (1935)
- Sweet Music (1935)
- In Caliente (1935)
- Broadway Gondolier (1935) – Additional Dialogue.
- Stars Over Broadway (1935)
- Little Big Shot (1935)
- Sweet Music (1935)
- Sons o' Guns (1936)
- Ever Since Eve (1937)
- Sing Me a Love Song (1937)
- Ready, Willing and Able (1937)
- Varsity Show (1937)
- Hard to Get (1938)
- Hollywood Hotel (1938)
- Gold Diggers in Paris (1938)
- Going Places (1938)
- Garden of the Moon (1938)
- Brother Rat (1938)
- The Kid from Kokomo (1939)
- The Roaring Twenties (1939)
- On Your Toes (1939)
- Naughty But Nice (1939)
- Three Cheers for the Irish (1940)
- Brother Rat and a Baby (1940)
- Brother Orchid (1940)
- Torrid Zone (1940)
- They Drive by Night (1940)
- Flight Angels (1940)
- Out of the Fog (1941)
- Navy Blues (1941)
- Million Dollar Baby (1941)
- Manpower (1941)
- The Hard Way (1943)
- Humoresque (1946)
- Possessed (1947)
- My Dream Is Yours (1949)
- The Damned Don't Cry! (1950)
- Peyton Place (1956)

=== Producer ===
- Navy Blues (1941)
- George Washington Slept Here (1942)
- The Man Who Came to Dinner (1942)
- All Through the Night (1942)
- Across the Pacific (1942)
- Larceny, Inc. (1942)
- Juke Girl (1942)
- Background to Danger (1943)
- The Hard Way (1943)
- Action in the North Atlantic (1943)
- Destination Tokyo (1944)
- The Very Thought of You (1944)
- In Our Time (1944)
- Objective, Burma! (1945)
- Mildred Pierce (1945)
- Pride of the Marines (1945)
- Humoresque (1946)
- The Unfaithful (1947)
- Dark Passage (1947)
- Possessed (1947)
- Key Largo (1948)
- Adventures of Don Juan (1948)
- Johnny Belinda (1948)
- To the Victor (1948)
- Flamingo Road (1949)
- Task Force (1949)
- Always Leave Them Laughing (1949)
- The Inspector General (1949)
- One Sunday Afternoon (1949)
- John Loves Mary (1949)
- The Damned Don't Cry (1950)
- Caged (1950)
- The Breaking Point (1950)
- Perfect Strangers (1950)
- Young Man with a Horn (1950)
- The Glass Menagerie (1950)
- Storm Warning (1951)
- The Blue Veil (1951)
- Behave Yourself! (1951)
- Clash by Night (1952)
- The Lusty Men (1952)
- Macao (1952)
- Miss Sadie Thompson (1954)
- Queen Bee (1955)
- The Eddy Duchin Story (1956)
- The Harder They Fall (1956)
- Kiss Them for Me (1957)
- Peyton Place (1957)
- An Affair to Remember (1957)
- No Down Payment (1957)
- Mardi Gras (1958)
- The Long, Hot Summer (1958)
- In Love and War (1958)
- The Story on Page One (1959)
- Beloved Infidel (1959)
- The Sound and the Fury (1959)
- The Best of Everything (1959)
- Hound-Dog Man (1959)
- Let's Make Love (1960)
- Sons and Lovers (1960)
- Return to Peyton Place (1961)
- Wild in the Country (1961)
- Mr. Hobbs Takes a Vacation (1962)
- Hemingway's Adventures of a Young Man (1962)
- The Stripper (1963)

== Accolades ==
He received two Academy Award nominations as producer of the following nominees for Best Picture: Peyton Place and Sons and Lovers. (Note: Wald also produced the Best Picture-nominees Mildred Pierce (1945) and Johnny Belinda (1948), but is not listed on the nominations.) Although he never won a competitive Oscar, he was awarded the Irving G. Thalberg Memorial Award in 1949.
