= John Ridgely =

American actor (1909–1968)

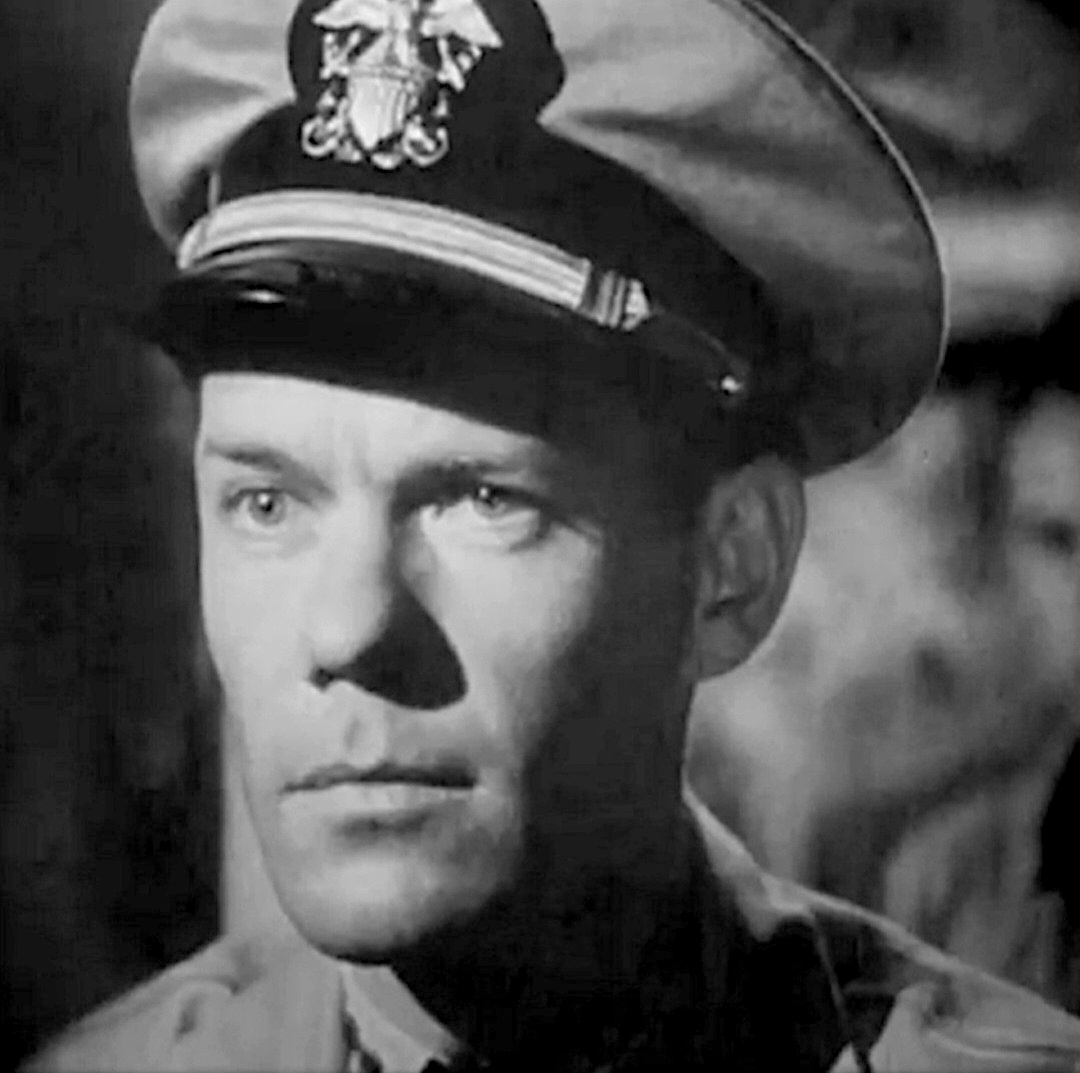
- Ridgely in the trailer for Destination Tokyo (1943)
- Born: John Huntington Rea; September 6, 1909; Chicago, Illinois, U.S.
- Died: January 18, 1968 (aged 58); New York City, U.S.
- Education: Stanford University
- Occupation: Actor
- Years active: 1935–1954
- Spouse: Virginia Robinson

John Ridgely (born John Huntington Rea, September 6, 1909 – January 18, 1968 ) was an American film character actor with over 175 film credits.

== Early years ==
Ridgely was born in Chicago, Illinois, the son of John Ridgely Rea. He completed his elementary schooling was in Hinsdale, Illinois, and he attended Kemper Military School in Boonville, Missouri. He also studied at Stanford University before making his movie debut.

== Film ==
He appeared in the 1946 Humphrey Bogart film The Big Sleep as blackmailing gangster Eddie Mars and had a pivotal role as a suffering heart patient in the film noir Nora Prentiss (1947). His most prominent other roles were his top-billed part as the bomber captain in Howard Hawks's Air Force and as real-life fighter pilot Tex Hill in 1945's God is My Co-Pilot.

The Chicago-born actor appeared in a large number of other films, particularly for Warner Bros., in the 1930s and 1940s.

Freelancing after 1948, Ridgely continued to essay general-purpose parts until he left films in 1953.

== Later life and death ==
He worked in summer-theater productions and television until his death from a heart attack at the age of 58 in 1968.

== Selected filmography ==
- Streamline Express (1935) as 2nd Steward (uncredited)
- They Won't Forget (1937) as Boy in Pool Room (uncredited)
- Submarine D-1 (1937) as Lieutenant Junior Grade (uncredited)
- Missing Witnesses (1937) as Train Ticket Clerk (uncredited)
- Hollywood Hotel (1937) as Tall Hotel Desk Clerk (uncredited)
- The Spy Ring (1938) as Spy Ring Member (uncredited)
- The Patient in Room 18 (1938) as Jim Warren
- The Invisible Menace (1938) as Pvt. Innes (scenes deleted)
- White Banners (1938) as Charles Ellis
- Blondes at Work (1938) as Regan
- Forbidden Valley (1938) as Duke Lafferty
- He Couldn't Say No (1938) as Ed the reporter
- Torchy Blane in Panama (1938) as Reynolds
- Crime School (1938) as Reporter Covering 'Escape' (uncredited)
- Western Trails (1938) as Ben McClure
- Little Miss Thoroughbred (1938) as Jim a.k.a. Slug, Becker's Henchman
- Men Are Such Fools (1938) as Jerry (uncredited)
- When Were You Born (1938) as Crenshaw, Policeman (uncredited)
- My Bill (1938) as Mr. Martin, Florist
- Cowboy from Brooklyn (1938) as Beacon Reporter
- Racket Busters (1938) as Yellow Stripe Truck Driver (uncredited)
- Boy Meets Girl (1938) as Simmons – Friday's Film Cutter (uncredited)
- Garden of the Moon (1938) as Sound Control Engineer (uncredited)
- Broadway Musketeers (1938) as Master of Ceremonies (scenes deleted)
- Hard to Get (1938) as Burke
- Torchy Gets Her Man (1938) as Bugs
- Nancy Drew... Detective (1938) as Radio Station Technician (uncredited)
- Going Places (1938) as Desk Clerk
- King of the Underworld (1939) as Jerry
- They Made Me a Criminal (1939) as Magee
- Torchy Blane in Chinatown (1939) as Submarine Officer (uncredited)
- Wings of the Navy (1939) as Dan Morrison
- Nancy Drew... Reporter (1939) as Hotel Clerk (uncredited)
- Secret Service of the Air (1939) as Joe LeRoy
- The Adventures of Jane Arden (1939) as Reporter
- You Can't Get Away with Murder (1939) as Gas Station Attendant
- On Trial (1939) as Radio Announcer (uncredited)
- Women in the Wind (1939) as Salesman (uncredited)
- Dark Victory (1939) as man Making Crack About Judith (uncredited)
- Confessions of a Nazi Spy (1939) as Army Hospital Clerk (uncredited)
- Torchy Runs for Mayor (1939) as Photographer in Mayor's Office (uncredited)
- The Kid from Kokomo (1939) as Sam, a 50% Owner
- Naughty but Nice (1939) as Harry, Hudson's Assistant (uncredited)
- Indianapolis Speedway (1939) as Ted Horn
- Waterfront (1939) as Orchestra Leader (uncredited)
- Each Dawn I Die (1939) as Reporter (uncredited)
- The Cowboy Quarterback (1939) as Mr. Walters
- Torchy Blane... Playing with Dynamite (1939) as Reporter at the Wrestling Match
- Everybody's Hobby (1939) as Ranger Mike Morgan
- The Angels Wash Their Faces (1939) as Reporter at Pillory (uncredited)
- Nancy Drew and the Hidden Staircase (1939) as Reporter
- Smashing the Money Ring (1939) as Policeman (uncredited)
- On Dress Parade (1939) as Fort Lewis Firing Range Sergeant (uncredited)
- The Roaring Twenties (1939) as Cab Driver (uncredited)
- Kid Nightingale (1939) as Whitey
- The Return of Doctor X (1939) as Rodgers
- A Child Is Born (1939) as Intern Going to See Operation (uncredited)
- Private Detective (1939) as Donald Norton
- Invisible Stripes (1939) as Employment Clerk (uncredited)
- The Fighting 69th (1940) as Moran (uncredited)
- Castle on the Hudson (1940) as Intake Guard (uncredited)
- Three Cheers for the Irish (1940) as Photographer (uncredited)
- 'Til We Meet Again (1940) as Junior Officer (uncredited)
- Saturday's Children (1940) as Mr. MacReady (voice, uncredited)
- Torrid Zone (1940) as Gardner
- Flight Angels (1940) as Lt. Parsons
- Brother Orchid (1940) as Texas Pearson
- Gambling on the High Seas (1940) as Police Radio Operator (uncredited)
- The Man Who Talked Too Much (1940) as Brooks
- They Drive By Night (1940) as Hank Dawson (uncredited)
- River's End (1940) as Constable Jeffers
- Money and the Woman (1940) as Doctor (uncredited)
- No Time for Comedy (1940) as Cashier (uncredited)
- Knute Rockne All American (1940) as Reporter (scenes deleted)
- The Letter (1940) as Driver (uncredited)
- Father Is a Prince (1940) as Salesman
- Lady with Red Hair (1940) as Actor Playing Paul (uncredited)
- Honeymoon for Three (1941) as Tomahawk Inn Desk Clerk (uncredited)
- The Great Mr. Nobody (1941) as Eddie Williams
- Here Comes Happiness (1941) as Jim
- Knockout (1941) as Pat Martin
- Strange Alibi (1941) as Tex
- The Wagons Roll at Night (1941) as Arch
- Million Dollar Baby (1941) as Ollie Ward
- Highway West (1941) as Alex – Armored Car Guard
- International Squadron (1941) as Bill Torrence
- Navy Blues (1941) as Jersey
- Nine Lives Are Not Enough (1941) as Mechanic (uncredited)
- They Died with Their Boots On (1941) as 2nd Lt. Davis (uncredited)
- Steel Against the Sky (1941) as Joe (uncredited)
- Dangerously They Live (1941) as John
- The Bride Came C.O.D. (1941) (uncredited)
- The Man Who Came to Dinner (1942) as Radio Man
- Bullet Scars (1942) as Hank O'Connor
- The Big Shot (1942) as Tim
- Wings for the Eagle (1942) as Johnson
- Secret Enemies (1942) as Agent John Trent
- Air Force (1943) as Capt. Quincannon, B-17 Pilot
- Northern Pursuit (1943) as Jim Austin
- Destination Tokyo (1943) as Reserve Officer Raymond
- The Doughgirls (1944) as Julian Cadman
- Arsenic and Old Lace (1944) as Officer Saunders
- Hollywood Canteen (1944) as himself
- God Is My Co-Pilot (1945) as David 'Tex' Hill
- Pride of the Marines (1945) as Jim Merchant
- Danger Signal (1945) as Thomas Turner
- My Reputation (1946) as Cary Abbott
- Two Guys from Milwaukee (1946) as Mike Collins
- The Big Sleep (1946) as Eddie Mars
- The Man I Love (1947) as Roy Otis
- Nora Prentiss (1947) as Walter Bailey, Heart Patient
- That Way with Women (1947) as Sam
- Possessed (1947) as Harker
- That's My Man (1947) as Ramsey
- Cheyenne (1947) as Chalkeye
- Cry Wolf (1947) as Jackson Laidell
- High Wall (1947) as David Wallace
- The Iron Curtain (1948) as RCMP Officer Murphy (uncredited)
- Night Wind (1948) as Walters
- Luxury Liner (1948) as Chief Officer Carver
- Sealed Verdict (1948) as Capt. Lance Nissen
- Trouble Makers (1948) as 'Silky' Thomas
- Command Decision (1948) as James Carwood
- Tucson (1949) as Ben
- Task Force (1949) as Dixie Rankin
- Once More, My Darling (1949) as Burke
- Border Incident (1949) as Mr. Neley
- Backfire (1950) as Plainclothesman (uncredited)
- Beauty on Parade (1950) as Jeffrey Woodstock
- The Lost Volcano (1950) as Fred Barton
- Edge of Doom (1950) as 1st Detective
- The Petty Girl (1950) as Patrolman
- South Sea Sinner (1950) as Don Williams
- Rookie Fireman (1950) as Harry Williams
- Saddle Tramp (1950) as Slim
- Al Jennings of Oklahoma (1951) as Railroad Detective Dan Hanes
- The Last Outpost (1951) as Sam McQuade
- A Place in the Sun (1951) as Coroner
- Thunder in God's Country (1951) as Bill Stafford
- Half Angel (1951) as Tim McCarey
- When the Redskins Rode (1951) as Christopher Gist
- When Worlds Collide (1951) as Chief Customs Inspector (uncredited)
- As You Were (1951) as Captain
- The Blue Veil (1951) as Doctor (uncredited)
- Room for One More (1952) as Harry Foreman
- The Greatest Show on Earth (1952) as Assistant Manager
- Fort Osage (1952) as Henry Travers
- The Outcasts of Poker Flat (1952) as Bill Akeley (uncredited)
- Off Limits (1952) as Lt. Cmdr. Parnell
- The Congregation (1952)

== Radio appearances ==
Year	Program	Episode/source
1938	Warner Brothers Academy Theater	Special Agent
