= Double or Nothing =

Double or nothing in gambling, is to repeat the same bet with the same wager.

Double or Nothing may also refer to:

== Films ==
- Double or Nothing (1936 film), a short film released by Warner Brothers
- Double or Nothing (1937 film), a musical feature film released by Paramount Pictures
- Double or Nothing (1940 film), a short film released by Warners with theme similar to 1936 film

== Books ==
- Double or Nothing (novel), a novel by Raymond Federman published in 1971
- Double or Nothing, a 2000 novel by Dennis Foon
- Double or Nothing, a 2008 autobiography by Thomas Breitling

== Television and radio ==
- "Double or Nothing" (Angel), a 2002 episode of the television series Angel
- Double or Nothing (radio show), a radio game show which aired from 1940 to 1954

== Music ==
- Double or Nothing (Big Sean and Metro Boomin album), 2017
- Double or Nothing (Erick Sermon album), 1995
- Double or Nothing (Lani Hall album), 1979
- Double or Nothing (Leaether Strip album), 1995
- "Double or Nothing", a song by B.o.B and Big Boi from the album Army of Two: The Devil's Cartel
- "Double or Nothing", a song by Booker T. & the M.G.'s from the album Hip Hug-Her

== Other uses ==
- AEW Double or Nothing, an annual professional wrestling event by All Elite Wrestling (AEW)

== See also ==
- Double or Quits (disambiguation)
