= Indianapolis Speedway (film) =

1939 film by Lloyd Bacon

- Theatrical release poster
- Directed by: Lloyd Bacon
- Screenplay by: Sig Herzig; Wally Kline
- Story by: Howard Hawks
- Produced by: Max Siegel
- Starring: Ann Sheridan; Pat O'Brien; John Payne; Gale Page; Frank McHugh; Grace Stafford
- Cinematography: Sidney Hickox
- Edited by: William Holmes
- Music by: Adolph Deutsch
- Production company: Warner Bros. Pictures
- Distributed by: Warner Bros. Pictures
- Release date: August 5, 1939
- Running time: 85 minutes
- Country: United States
- Language: English

Indianapolis Speedway is a 1939 American drama film directed by Lloyd Bacon and written by Sig Herzig and Wally Kline.The film stars Ann Sheridan, Pat O'Brien, John Payne, Gale Page, Frank McHugh and Grace Stafford. The film was released by Warner Bros. on August 5, 1939.

This film is a remake of The Crowd Roars, which starred James Cagney; McHugh repeats his role from the earlier film.

== Plot ==
Two auto racing brothers become rivals on the racetrack when the older brother tries to keep his younger one from dropping out of school and becoming a driver too. The stubborn younger brother just gets behind the wheel of someone else's car and the race is on. During the reckless running of the race, the older brother's best friend is killed precipitating the beginning of the end for the older driver.

== Cast ==
- Ann Sheridan as "Frankie" Merrick
- Pat O'Brien as Joe Greer
- John Payne as Eddie Greer
- Gale Page as Lee Mason
- Frank McHugh as "Spud" Connors
- Grace Stafford as Martha Connors
- Granville Bates as Mr. Greer
- John Ridgely as Ted Horn
- Regis Toomey as Dick Wilbur
- John Harron as "Red", Eddie's Pitman
- William B. Davidson as Duncan Martin
- Edward McWade as Tom Dugan
- Irving Bacon as Fred Haskill
- Tommy Bupp as Haskill's Son
- Robert Middlemass as Edward Hart
- Charles Halton as The Mayor
