= Double or Quits =

Double or Quits may refer to:

- Double or nothing, or often double or quits in the UK, a gamble to decide whether a loss or debt should be doubled
- Double or Quits (1938 film), a British crime film
- Double or Quits (1953 film), a French comedy film

== See also ==
- Double or Nothing (disambiguation)
