= Marry the Girl (1937 film) =

1937 film by William C. McGann

- Directed by: William C. McGann
- Written by: Sig Herzig; Pat C. Flick; Tom Reed
- Based on: Marry the Girl; 1935 story in American Magazine by Edward Hope
- Produced by: Bryan Foy
- Starring: Mary Boland; Frank McHugh; Hugh Herbert
- Cinematography: Arthur L. Todd
- Edited by: Warren Low
- Music by: Heinz Roemheld
- Production company: Warner Bros. Pictures
- Distributed by: Warner Bros. Pictures
- Release date: July 13, 1937
- Running time: 68 minutes
- Country: United States
- Language: English

Marry the Girl is a 1937 American romantic comedy film directed by William C. McGann. The 68 minute film, set at a newspaper syndicate, was written by Sig Herzig and Pat C. Flick, shot by cinematographer Arthur L. Todd, and was produced by Bryan Foy and Jack L. Warner under the Warner Bros. Pictures banner.

== Plot ==
Ollie Radway is a daffy dowager who, with equally eccentric brother John, runs a thriving newspaper. After firing the managing editor for failing to keep her niece Virginia out of the newspaper business, she hands the job to David Partridge, a minor employee with a crush on the girl. In short order, Partridge is assigned to keep Virginia away from fortune-hunting editorial artist Dimitri Kyeff.

== Cast ==
- Mary Boland as Ollie Radway
- Frank McHugh as David 'Party' Partridge
- Hugh Herbert as John B. Radway
- Carol Hughes as Virginia Radway
- Allen Jenkins as Specs
- Mischa Auer as Dimitri Kyeff
- Alan Mowbray as Dr. Hayden Stryker
- Hugh O'Connell as Michael 'Mike' Forrester
- Teddy Hart as Biff
- Tom Kennedy as Jasper
- Dewey Robinson as Buster
- Arthur Aylesworth as Third Southerner
- Olin Howland as First Southerner
- William B. Davidson as Drake
- Charles Judels as Andre Victor Antoine Descate

== Critical reception ==
Harrison's Reports provided a negative review, and wrote, "Poor! Competent comedians such as Mary Boland, Frank McHugh, Hugh Herbert, Mischa Auer, Alan Mowbray, and Allen Jenkins, struggle helplessly through their lines: they would have to be magicians to have put life into their parts. The story makes no sense; the characters, judged by what they say or do, seem insane."
