= Ready, Willing and Able (film) =

1937 film by Ray Enright

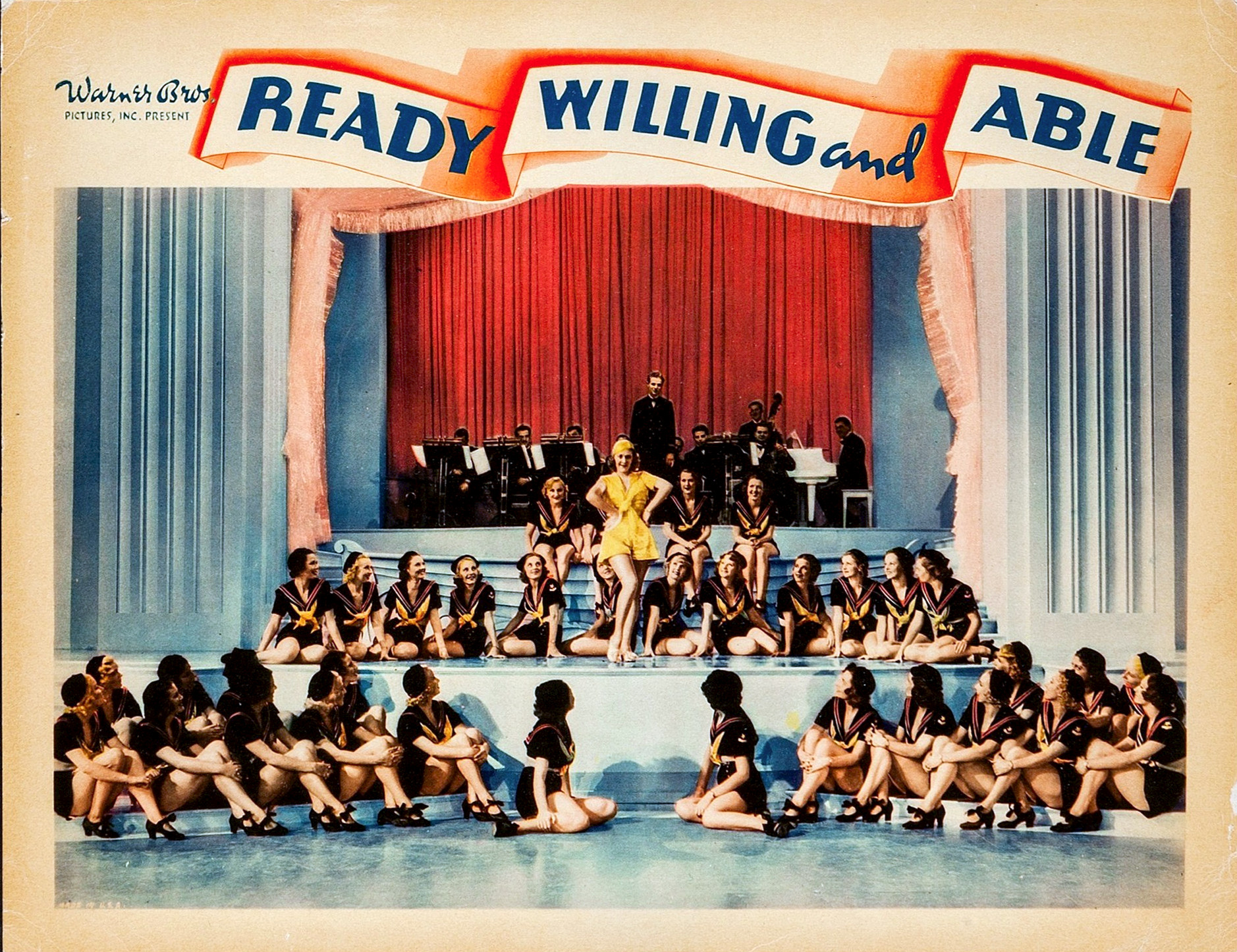
- Directed by: Ray Enright
- Written by: Maurice Leo; Pat C. Flick; Ben Markson; Mary C. McCall Jr. Lew Lipton
- Screenplay by: Warren Duff; Sig Herzig; Jerry Wald
- Based on: Ready, Willing and Able; 1935 story in The Saturday Evening Post by Richard Macaulay
- Produced by: Samuel Bischoff
- Starring: Ruby Keeler; Lee Dixon; Allen Jenkins
- Cinematography: Sol Polito
- Edited by: Doug Gould
- Music by: Heinz Eric Roemheld
- Production company: Warner Bros. Pictures
- Distributed by: Warner Bros. Pictures
- Release date: March 6, 1937
- Running time: 93 minutes
- Country: United States
- Language: English

Ready, Willing and Able is a 1937 American musical film directed by Ray Enright and starring Ruby Keeler, Lee Dixon, Allen Jenkins and Ross Alexander. It was produced and distributed by Warner Bros. Pictures. Songs in the film were written by composer Richard A. Whiting and lyricist Johnny Mercer. The most successful song introduced by Wini Shaw and Ross Alexander, and reprised throughout, was "Too Marvelous for Words", which has become a pop and jazz standard.

In the final production number choreographed by Bobby Connolly, Ruby Keeler and Lee Dixon tap across the keys of a giant-sized typewriter while dancers’ legs mimic typebars striking letters. The film was released to lackluster business in the aftermath of Alexander's suicide.

== Plot ==
Fledgling Broadway playwright Barry Granville (Ross Alexander) and his partner, songwriter Pinky Blair (Lee Dixon), get funding for their musical, contingent on hiring London stage star Jane Clarke as the lead. Greeting Clarke's ship from England at the pier in New York, the agent 'Katsy' Van Courtland mistakes an American college student, also named Jane Clarke (Ruby Keeler), for the British actress. Willing to try acting, the American Jane masquerades as the London star, and agrees to appear in the musical. Despite being willing, Jane struggles, avoiding singing in any rehearsals for weeks because of her lack of a British accent. Finally, she confesses the ruse to Barry. Meanwhile, the British Jane Clarke puts the show's prospects at risk by threatening to sue.

== Cast ==
- Ruby Keeler as Jane Clarke
- Lee Dixon as Pinky 'Pinkie' Blair
- Allen Jenkins as J. 'Katsy' Van Courtland
- Louise Fazenda as Clara Heineman
- Ross Alexander as Barry Granville
- Carol Hughes as Angie
- Hugh O'Connell as Truman Hardy
- Wini Shaw as The English Jane Clarke
- Teddy Hart as Yip Nolan
- Addison Richards as Edward 'Mac' McNeil
- E.E. Clive as Sir Buffington
- Jane Wyman as Receptionist
- Lillian Kemble-Cooper as Mrs. Buffington
- unbilled players include Beatrice Hagen, Virginia Dabney, and Milton Kibbee

== Bibliography ==
- Bubbeo, Daniel. The Women of Warner Brothers: The Lives and Careers of 15 Leading Ladies, with Filmographies for Each. McFarland, 2001.
