= Lee Dixon (actor) =

American actor

- Born: January 22, 1910; Brooklyn, New York, United States
- Died: January 8, 1953 (aged 42); New York City, New York, USA
- Occupations: Stage and vaudeville actor
- Years active: 1932–1947
- Spouse: Eileen Shirley (m. 1944)

Lee Dixon (January 22, 1910 – January 8, 1953) was an American tap dancer, singer, musician and actor in the 1930s and 1940s. He appeared in Hollywood musicals and other films, as well as on the Broadway stage.

== Biography ==
Dixon's parents were a dance team, and he first appeared on stage as an encore to their performance when he was 3 years old. He became established as a vaudeville performer before he was 17.

In his adulthood, Dixon worked at a variety of jobs before he became a full-time entertainer. An encounter with Rudy Vallee in 1934 provided the opportunity to make that transition. Dixon was master of ceremonies at the Cocoanut Grove night club in Boston when Vallee visited the club. He liked Dixon's performance well enough to offer him a contract to appear with his band, and he encouraged Dixon to have a screen test. Dixon took the contract, and a few months later he tested well enough to gain a contract with Warner Bros.

On Broadway, Dixon created Will Parker in Oklahoma! (He said that Rodgers and Hammerstein developed that role from watching him perform in a tryout of Heels Together. He said: "It seems they were thinking of adding a comedy character and had been hunting for an idea for one. When they saw me, they got an idea for building the part around a big, dumb cowboy who looked like me so they let me play him!") He also portrayed Mike O'Brien in Higher and Higher. He toured the United States in 1941 in the stage show Oomph in Swingtime.

As a Dancer, Dixon preferred to work solo, although producers usually wanted him to dance with a female partner or with a group of chorus girls.

Dixon was an alcoholic. On July 8, 1944, he married Eileen Shirley, a member of the Ziegfeld Follies, in New York. He died on January 8, 1953, in New York City.

== Filmography ==
- A Modern Cinderella (1932, short) as Male Dancer, uncredited
- Gold Diggers of 1937 (1936) as Boop Oglethorpe
- Ready, Willing and Able (1937) as Pinky Blair
- The Singing Marine (1937) as Slim Baxter
- Varsity Show (1937) as Johnny 'Rubberlegs' Stevens
- “Ready, Willing, and Able” (1937)
- Billy Rose's Casa Mañana Revue (1938, short) as Dixon
- Double or Nothing (1940, short) as Bill
- Double Rhythm (a.k.a. Musical Parade: Double Rhythm) (1946, short) as Happy
- Angel and the Badman (a.k.a. The Angel and the Outlaw) (1947) as Randy McCall, final film role

== Broadway ==
- Oklahoma! (1943-1948)
- Higher and Higher (1940)
