= The Kid from Kokomo =

1939 film by Lewis Seiler

- Theatrical release poster
- Directed by: Lewis Seiler
- Screenplay by: Richard Macaulay; Jerry Wald
- Story by: Dalton Trumbo
- Produced by: Samuel Bischoff
- Starring: Pat O'Brien; Wayne Morris; Joan Blondell; May Robson; Jane Wyman; Stanley Fields
- Cinematography: Sidney Hickox
- Edited by: Jack Killifer
- Music by: Adolph Deutsch
- Production company: Warner Bros. Pictures
- Distributed by: Warner Bros. Pictures
- Release date: May 23, 1939
- Running time: 93 minutes
- Country: United States
- Language: English

The Kid from Kokomo is a 1939 American comedy film directed by Lewis Seiler and written by Richard Macaulay and Jerry Wald. The film stars Pat O'Brien, Wayne Morris, Joan Blondell, May Robson, Jane Wyman and Stanley Fields. The film was released by Warner Bros. Pictures on May 23, 1939.

== Plot ==
In need of a new prizefighter, manager Billy Murphy and his sweetheart Doris Harvey come across one in Kokomo, Indiana, a kid called Homer Baston who's got great potential. The kid's a little dim, however, explaining how he can't leave Kokomo because his mother abandoned him as a baby but promised to come back.

Billy and Doris convince him to go on the road, where Homer will have a better chance of finding his long-missing mother. Homer gets homesick, so Billy pays the bail of a thief, Maggie Manell, hiring her to pretend to be Homer's ma. She begins spending most of Homer's money, and Billy's scheme to bring in her pal Muscles Malone backfires when Homer's led to believe Muscles is his dad.

While falling for Marian Bronson, a reporter, Homer trains for a title fight against Curley Bender, but is convinced by "Ma" to lose on purpose because she owes money to gamblers. In the ring, Curley insults his mother, so Homer knocks him out. Billy and Doris look on as a double wedding is held, Homer marrying Marian while a reluctant Maggie and Muscles do likewise, becoming his new foster parents.

== Cast ==
- Pat O'Brien as William Jennings 'Billy / 'Square Shooting Murph' Murphy
- Wayne Morris as Homer Baston
- Joan Blondell as Doris Harvey
- May Robson as Margaret 'Maggie' / 'Ma' Manell
- Jane Wyman as Marian Bronson
- Stanley Fields as Muscles Malone
- Maxie Rosenbloom as Curley Bender
- Sidney Toler as Judge William 'Gashouse' Bronson
- Edward Brophy as Eddie Black
- Winifred Harris as Mrs. Bronson
- Morgan Conway as Louie
- John Ridgely as Sam
- Ward Bond as Ladislaw Klewicki
- Paul Hurst as First Old Man in Fistfight

== See also ==
- List of boxing films
