= Navy Blues (1941 film) =

1941 film by Lloyd Bacon

- Theatrical release poster
- Directed by: Lloyd Bacon
- Screenplay by: Jerry Wald; Richard Macaulay; Arthur T. Horman; Sam Perrin
- Story by: Arthur T. Horman
- Produced by: Jerry Wald; Jack Saper (associate producers)
- Starring: Ann Sheridan; Jack Oakie; Martha Raye; Jack Haley; Navy Blues Sextet
- Cinematography: Tony Gaudio, A.S.C. dance sequences: Sol Polito, A.S.C. James Wong Howe, A.S.C.
- Edited by: Rudi Fehr
- Music by: Arthur Schwartz; Johnny Mercer (music and lyrics); Leo F. Forbstein (musical director)
- Production company: Warner Bros.–First National Pictures
- Distributed by: Warner Bros. Pictures
- Release date: September 13, 1941
- Running time: 108 minutes
- Country: United States
- Language: English
- Budget: $929,000
- Box office: $1,826,000

Navy Blues is a 1941 American musical comedy film produced by Warner Bros.–First National Pictures and starring Ann Sheridan, Jack Oakie, Martha Raye, and Jack Haley. It was directed by Lloyd Bacon and written by Jerry Wald, Richard Macaulay, Arthur T. Horman and Sam Perrin. Herbert Anderson and Jack Carson have prominent support roles, and Jackie Gleason appears in a bit part (billed as "Jackie C. Gleason" in his screen debut). The film was released by Warner Bros. Pictures on September 13, 1941.

== Plot ==
"Honolulu ...where "Aloha" means goodbye, and "Shore Leave" means trouble..."

Margie Jordan and her friend Lilibelle Bolton arrive in Honolulu, much to the surprise of Lillibelle's former husband, Powerhouse Bolton, a sailor who is behind on the alimony he owes her.

In need of cash, Powerhouse and his shipmate Cake O'Hara come up with a scheme. Learning that the crew is about to include Homer Matthews, the top big gun aimer in the Navy, they make bets with both shipmates and countless sailors from rival ships on how an upcoming shooting competition will turn out. The pals are then stunned when it turns out Homer's going home, his service hitch being up before the contest.

In a panic, Cake attempts to buy back others' bets on a discount - before they find about Homer leaving the Navy prior to the competition - only to discover they're in the know and ecstatic about seeing him set to take a big fall.

The boys put the comely Margie up to wooing Homer, giving him the line that she's only attracted to career Navy men. Although he misses the family farm desperately, Homer falls in love with her and re-enilsts. He wins the contest and Margie, too. Lilibelle grabs the prize money before Powerhouse can...only to lose it to shore patrol as "evidence" needed in an investigation of the hijinks.

== Cast ==
- Ann Sheridan as Margie Jordan
- Jack Oakie as Cake O'Hara
- Martha Raye as Lilibelle Bolton
- Jack Haley as Powerhouse Bolton
- Herbert Anderson as Homer Matthews
- Jack Carson as "Buttons" Johnson
- Jackie C. Gleason as Tubby
- William T. Orr as Mac
- Richard Lane as "Rocky" Anderson
- John Ridgely as Jersey
- Katharine Aldridge
- Georgia Carroll
- Marguerite Chapman
- Peggy Diggins
- Loraine Gettman
- Claire James
- Navy Blues Sextet

== Production ==
Johnny Mercer wrote the song "Strip Polka" for use in the film, but film censor Joseph Breen objected to the moral tone of the lyrics, so the song was not used.

== Box office ==
According to Warner Bros. records, the film had a budget of $929,000, and earned $1,243,000 in the U.S. and $583,000 elsewhere.
