= Varsity Show (film) =

1937 film by William Keighley

- Directed by: William Keighley
- Screenplay by: Jerry Wald; Reichard Macaulay; Sig Herzig; Warren Duff
- Story by: Warren Duff; Sig Herzig
- Starring: Dick Powell; Fred Waring and Waring's Pennsylvanians; Ted Healy; Priscilla Lane
- Cinematography: Sol Polito; George Barnes (finale)
- Edited by: George Amy
- Music by: Ray Heindorf (uncredited); Heinz Roemheld (uncredited)
- Distributed by: Warner Bros. Pictures
- Release date: October 4, 1937
- Running time: 121 minutes (original release); 80 minutes (edited release)
- Country: United States
- Language: English
- Budget: over $1 million

Varsity Show is a 1937 American musical film directed by William Keighley from a script by Jerry Wald, Richard Macaulay, Warren Duff and Sig Herzig and starring Dick Powell, Fred Waring and Waring's Pennsylvanians, Ted Healy and Priscilla Lane. Released by Warner Bros. Pictures, it features songs by Richard A. Whiting and many others. The finale was directed by Busby Berkeley.

== Plot ==
The film follows a group of students at fictional Winfield College who butt heads with their faculty advisor while producing the annual Varsity Show. They decide to enlist help from an alumnus, Chuck Daly (Dick Powell), who is now a Broadway producer, to direct the show. What they don't know is that Daly's last three shows were big flops.

Professor Biddle, Winfield's drama professor, wants a production in the fine tradition of College Circa 1900. The students want to stage a show that is au courant, backed by Professor Mason, Biddle's assistant. Inevitably, Daly and the students clash with the stodgy Biddle. There is also the complication that Hollywood wants Chuck to come out and direct a musical, and is pressing him for an answer.

A series of humorous events ensues, including an outbreak of mumps Chuck uses to temporarily get Biddle out of the picture; a counterstroke by Biddle involving exams that must be passed for the students to maintain eligibility for student activities; and a student strike protesting Biddle's continuing as producer of the Varsity Show that attracts national attention. On learning the Hollywood offer has been withdrawn and in need of money, Daly returns to New York City and signs a contract to perform in another show.

The Winfield students aren't willing to give up on Chuck. Led by Professor Mason, they follow him to the city. They take over the Stuyvesant Theater, and give their first performance to a significant percentage of the NYPD, the local National Guard unit, and the Mayor, who all came to eject them from their illegal occupation of the theater. The Varsity Show opens on Broadway with great success, and Daly's reputation as a producer is rehabilitated.

== Cast ==
- Dick Powell as Charles 'Chuck' Daly
- Fred Waring and His Pennsylvanians as Fred Waring Orchestra
- Ted Healy as William Williams
- Rosemary Lane as Barbara 'Babs' Steward
- Priscilla Lane as Betty Bradley
- Walter Catlett as Professor Sylvester Biddle
- Johnnie Davis as Buzz Bolton
- Ford Washington Lee as Buck
- John William Sublett as Bubbles
- Fred Waring as Ernie Mason
- Lee Dixon (actor) as Johnny 'Rubberlegs' Stevens
- Sterling Holloway as Trout
- Mabel Todd as Cuddles
- Scotty Bates as Scotty
- George MacFarland as Hap
- Poley McClintock as Poley

== Production ==
Almost the entirety of Varsity Show was filmed on the campus of Pomona College ("Winfield College" in the movie), which lead to students cutting classes. In 1937, Fred Waring was approached to play a starring role in this film. He brought his famous glee club, the Pennsylvanians, to the shoot and planned on using the college glee club from Pomona College for additional singers. When Waring arrived at the campus he found the Glee Club conductor was ill but his replacement was Robert Shaw. Shaw followed Fred Waring, after the movie was finished, to New York. There, Shaw founded the Collegiate Chorale and the Robert Shaw Chorale. Robert Shaw went on to be one of the most important personalities in American choral music in the 20th century.

== Bibliography ==
- Green, Stanley (1999) Hollywood Musicals Year by Year (2nd ed.), pub. Hal Leonard Corporation ISBN 0-634-00765-3 page 72
