= Jeepers Creepers (song) =

1938 song by Harry Warren and Johnny Mercer

"Jeepers Creepers" is a popular song and jazz standard. The music was written by Harry Warren and the lyrics by Johnny Mercer for the 1938 movie Going Places. It was premiered by Louis Armstrong and has been covered by many other musicians. The song was nominated for the Academy Award for Best Original Song in 1938 but lost to "Thanks for the Memory". The song was included in the 1984 Smithsonian collection American Popular Song: Six Decades of Songwriters and Singers and in the 1998 album The Songs of Harry Warren.

== Background ==
In the film Going Places, Louis Armstrong sang the song to a racehorse named Jeepers Creepers. The phrase "jeepers creepers", a minced oath for "Jesus Christ", predates both the song and film. Mercer said that the title came from a Henry Fonda line in an earlier movie. The lyrics include:

Jeepers Creepers, where'd ya get those peepers?
Jeepers Creepers, where'd ya get those eyes?

== 1939 recordings ==
- There were three popular versions of the song released in 1939, by Louis Armstrong, Larry Clinton, and Al Donahue. It served as a contrafact for the Tadd Dameron composition "Flossie Lou".

== Controversy ==
- Siouxsie and the Banshees's 1988 single "Peek-a-Boo" caused a minor controversy shortly after its release, as the lines of the chorus ("Golly jeepers/Where'd you get those weepers?/Peepshow, creepshow/Where did you get those eyes?") were found to be too similar to the lyrics of "Jeepers Creepers." To remedy the situation and to avoid legal action, the band gave co-songwriting credit on "Peek-a-Boo" to Warren and Mercer.
