= Sing Me a Love Song =

1936 film by Ray Enright

- Directed by: Ray Enright
- Screenplay by: Sig Herzig; Jerry Wald
- Story by: Harry Sauber
- Produced by: Samuel Bischoff
- Starring: James Melton; Patricia Ellis; Hugh Herbert; ZaSu Pitts; Allen Jenkins; Nat Pendleton
- Cinematography: Arthur L. Todd
- Edited by: Thomas Pratt
- Music by: Heinz Roemheld
- Production company: Cosmopolitan Productions
- Distributed by: Warner Bros. Pictures
- Release date: December 25, 1936 (New York City)
- Running time: 75 minutes
- Country: United States
- Language: English

Sing Me a Love Song is a 1936 American musical film directed by Ray Enright and written by Sig Herzig and Jerry Wald. The film stars James Melton, Patricia Ellis, Hugh Herbert, ZaSu Pitts, Allen Jenkins and Nat Pendleton. The Warner Bros. film premiered in New York City on Christmas Day 1936 and went into general release on January 9, 1937.

== Cast ==
- James Melton as Jerry Haines
- Patricia Ellis as Jean Martin
- Hugh Herbert as Siegfried Hammerschlag
- ZaSu Pitts as Gwen Logan
- Allen Jenkins as 'Chris' Cross
- Nat Pendleton as Rocky

== Reception ==
The New York Times reviewer found Sing Me a Love Song "really pretty gay fare", with "several catchy Dubin and Warren tunes."
