= Manpower (1941 film) =

1941 film directed by Raoul Walsh

- Theatrical release poster
- Directed by: Raoul Walsh
- Screenplay by: Richard Macaulay; Jerry Wald
- Produced by: Hal B. Wallis; Mark Hellinger
- Starring: Edward G. Robinson; Marlene Dietrich; George Raft
- Cinematography: Ernest Haller
- Edited by: Ralph Dawson
- Music by: Adolph Deutsch; Song: "He Lied and I Listened"; Frank Loesser (lyrics); Frederick Hollander (music)
- Production company: Warner Bros. Pictures
- Distributed by: Warner Bros. Pictures
- Release date: August 9, 1941
- Running time: 102-103 minutes
- Country: United States
- Language: English
- Budget: $918,000
- Box office: $1,842,000

Manpower is a 1941 American crime melodrama directed by Raoul Walsh and starring Edward G. Robinson, Marlene Dietrich, and George Raft. The picture was written by Richard Macaulay and Jerry Wald, and the supporting cast features Alan Hale, Frank McHugh, Eve Arden, Barton MacLane, Ward Bond and Walter Catlett.

== Plot ==
A leg injury causes Los Angeles power line worker Hank McHenry to give up field work and accept a promotion to foreman. His crew includes good friend Johnny Marshall and old Pop Duval.

Pop is killed during an ice storm. His daughter Fay's seeming indifference to the death irritates Johnny, but Hank is attracted to her. A hostess in a nightclub, Fay accepts money from Hank and also his marriage proposal, even though she does not love him.

Before a project that takes them to Boulder Dam, an injury befalls Johnny. He is taken into Hank's home to recuperate where, after a month together, Fay tells him she is attracted to him but Johnny resists her. Fay decides to leave Hank, but she is arrested in a raid while she is visiting her old club. Johnny pays her bail and stops her leaving Hank. However, she tells Hank that she is leaving him and is attracted to Johnny and a combination of circumstances means that Hank misconstrues the situation, believing Johnny has betrayed him.

In wet and windy weather, Hank climbs a pylon with his bad leg to attack Johnny, during which Hank falls to his death. Johnny is left to decide whether he is attracted to Fay or repelled by her; he makes his decision while Fay is waiting for the bus to leave town.

== Cast ==
- Edward G. Robinson as Hank "Gimpy" McHenry
- Marlene Dietrich as Fay Duval
- George Raft as Johnny Marshall
- Alan Hale, Sr. as Jumbo Wells
- Frank McHugh as Omaha
- Eve Arden as Dolly
- Barton MacLane as Smiley Quinn
- Ward Bond as Eddie Adams
- Walter Catlett as Sidney Whipple, Hank's hospital roommate
- Joyce Compton as Scarlett
- Lucia Carroll as Flo
- Egon Brecher as Pop Duval
- Cliff Clark as Cully
- Joseph Crehan as Sweeney
- Ben Welden as Al Hurst
- Barbara Pepper as Polly
- Dorothy Appleby as Wilma

== Production ==
Working titles for the film were "Handle with Care", "Hard to Get", and "Hard to Handle". Production took place from late March to mid-May 1941.

Humphrey Bogart had been considered for Robinson's role, but Raft refused to make the film with Bogart as his co-star; Broderick Crawford was also considered for Robinson's part. Victor McLaglen was also considered to play Robinson's role.

Raft chose to make Manpower over the remake of the 1931 pre-Code version of Dashiell Hammett's The Maltese Falcon, partly because it was a choice between untried first-time director John Huston and Walsh, the veteran director of Raft's 1933 hit The Bowery, plus Raft reasoned that a Hays Code-era remake may not be able to live up to its pre-Code predecessor, so the career-catapulting role of Sam Spade went to Bogart instead.

The script is one of many reworkings of the plotline for a 1932 Robinson movie called Tiger Shark, in which Robinson played essentially the same part, only as a tuna fisherman rather than an electric power lineman.

Mark Hellinger was intended to produce the film, but had a falling-out with executive producer Hal Wallis. Hellinger is credited as "Associate Producer".

Walsh was keen to make the film because he was getting a reputation as a "Man's" director and Marlene Dietrich had a lead role. Claire Trevor was considered to play Dietrich's role.

The film's screenplay by Richard Macaulay and Jerry Wald has strong similarities to two earlier Warners' films, Other Men's Women (1931) and Tiger Shark (1932).

=== Raft-Robinson conflict ===
Production was marked by several conflicts between Raft and Robinson, mostly initiated by Raft. Robinson recalled Raft as "touchy, difficult and thoroughly impossible to play with."

Raft was romantically interested in Dietrich, and believed that Robinson was as well. Raft verbally abused Robinson about a line of Robinson's dialogue; this was the subject of a complaint from Warner Bros to the Screen Actors Guild, causing Robinson to leave the set and production to halt for several hours. A few days later, Raft pushed Robinson around the set and verbally attacked him again; once more, filming was halted, for a full day this time. Raft later complained that Robinson tried to tell him how to act; he also felt the actor was miscast, preferring Victor McLaglen, who had been considered for the part. He resented having to accept third billing despite having the largest role in the film.

Robinson and Raft appeared together again 14 years later for a B-movie film noir entitled A Bullet for Joey (1955), after both their careers had seriously declined.

== Reception ==
Bosley Crowther wrote a positive review for the film in The New York Times, noting that the cast was outstanding: "With such exceptional material, the Warner blacksmiths couldn't help but make good—good, in this sense—meaning the accomplishment of a tough, fast, exciting adventure film." Channel 4's review of the movie notes the exciting setting makes it worth seeing, but goes on to pan the film: "Directed with the usual efficiency by Walsh, Manpower's weak script never manages to convince despite the setting and the strong cast." The film was a solid box office hit. According to Warner Bros records, it earned $1,180,000 domestically and $662,000 foreign.

== Adaptation ==
The film's three stars reprised their roles for a radio version broadcast by Lux Radio Theatre on March 16, 1942.
