= Across the Pacific =

1942 American spy film

- Directed by: John Huston; Vincent Sherman
- Screenplay by: Richard Macaulay
- Based on: "Aloha Means Goodbye" (1941 The Saturday Evening Post story) by Robert Carson
- Produced by: Jack Saper; Jerry Wald
- Starring: Humphrey Bogart; Mary Astor; Sydney Greenstreet
- Cinematography: Arthur Edeson
- Edited by: Frank Magee
- Music by: Adolph Deutsch
- Production company: Warner Bros. Pictures
- Distributed by: Warner Bros. Pictures
- Release date: September 4, 1942
- Running time: 97 minutes
- Country: United States
- Language: English
- Budget: $576,000
- Box office: $1.3 million (US rentals) $2,375,000 (worldwide)

Across the Pacific is a 1942 American spy film set on the eve of the entry of the United States into World War II. It was directed first by John Huston, then by Vincent Sherman after Huston joined the United States Army Signal Corps. It stars Humphrey Bogart, Mary Astor, and Sydney Greenstreet. Despite the title, the action never progresses across the Pacific, concluding in Panama. The original script portrayed an attempt to avert a Japanese plan to invade Pearl Harbor. When the real-life attack on Pearl Harbor occurred, production was shut down for three months, resuming on March 2, 1942, with a revised script changing the target to Panama.

The screenplay by Richard Macauley was an adaptation of a Saturday Evening Post serial by Robert Carson, "Aloha Means Goodbye", published June 28 – July 26, 1941.

Warner Bros. Pictures used the same title for a 1926 silent adventure film starring Monte Blue, who has a small role in this picture. However, the plots of the two films have no similarities.

== Plot ==
On November 17, 1941, on Governor's Island in New York City, Captain Rick Leland is court-martialed and discharged from the United States Army Coast Artillery Corps after he is caught stealing. He tries to join the Princess Patricia's Canadian Light Infantry but is coldly rebuffed. Ostensibly on his way to China to fight for Chiang Kai-shek, he boards a Japanese ship, the Genoa Maru, sailing from Halifax, Nova Scotia to Yokohama via the Panama Canal and Hawaii.

On board, Leland meets Canadian Alberta Marlow who claims to be from Medicine Hat, and a lighthearted romance begins. The other passengers are Dr. Lorenz and his servant, T. Oki. Lorenz, a professor of sociology, admires the Japanese and therefore is very unpopular in the Philippines, where he resides. Leland, in turn, makes it clear that he will fight for anyone willing to pay him enough.

During a stop in New York City, Leland is revealed as a secret agent when he reports to Colonel Hart, an undercover Army Intelligence officer. Lorenz is a known enemy spy, but Hart and Leland are uncertain about Marlow. Hart also warns him to look out for a Japanese criminal named Joe Totsuiko. Returning to the ship, Leland surprises a Filipino assassin about to shoot Lorenz. Leland gains Lorenz's confidence by remaining indifferent when Lorenz has the man killed. Totsuiko embarks as a passenger, in the guise of a wise-cracking young Nisei, and a different man returns as T. Oki. Lorenz pays Leland in advance for information concerning the military installations guarding the Panama Canal.

In Panama, Captain Higoto announces that Japanese ships are being denied entry into the Canal and must detour around Cape Horn. Leland, Marlow and Lorenz wait for another vessel at Sam's hotel. Crates addressed to Dan Morton, Bountiful Plantation, are unloaded. Lorenz demands that Leland procure up-to-date schedules for the air patrol. On December 6, 1941, Leland meets with his local contact, A. V. Smith, and convinces him to provide real timetables, as Lorenz would recognize fakes. Smith adds that plantation owner Morton is a rich dipsomaniac and that Marlow is a buyer for Rogers Fifth Avenue in New York City.

Leland hands over the schedules and is brutally beaten. He revives several hours later and immediately calls Smith, warning him to change the patrol schedule. Smith is killed after Leland hangs up. Lorenz and Marlow are gone. Sam sends Leland to a cinema, where a man whispers, "Go Bountiful Plantation..." and is killed. At the plantation, Leland sees a torpedo bomber being prepared. He is captured and brought to Lorenz. Also present are Totsuiko, Marlow, Morton, and the second T. Oki, who turns out to be a Japanese prince and pilot. Morton, whose weakness was exploited by the enemy agents to gain a base for their activities, is Marlow's father. Her only stake in the affair is his welfare.

Lorenz reveals that Smith is dead, so the prince can destroy the Panama Canal locks without interference. Totsuiko is left to guard the prisoners. When Morton staggers to his feet, Totsuiko shoots him, but that enables Leland to overpower Totsuiko. Outside, Leland seizes a machine gun, shoots down the bomber as it is taking off, and dispatches Lorenz's henchmen. In the house, a defeated Lorenz attempts to commit seppuku, but his nerve fails him. He begs Leland to kill him. Leland refuses, telling Lorenz he "has a date with Army Intelligence." Leland and Marlow clasp hands and look up at a sky filling with American planes.

== Cast ==
Alberta Marlow (Mary Astor) and Rick Leland (Humphrey Bogart) aboard the Genoa Maru.

- Humphrey Bogart as Rick Leland
- Mary Astor as Alberta Marlow
- Sydney Greenstreet as Dr. Lorenz
- Kam Tong as T. Oki
- Charles Halton as A.V. Smith
- Victor Sen Yung as Joe Totsuiko
- Roland Got as Sugi
- Lee Tung Foo as Sam Wing On
- Frank Wilcox as Captain Morrison
- Paul Stanton as Colonel Hart
- Lester Matthews as Canadian Major
- John Hamilton as Court-Martial President
- Roland Drew as Captain Harkness
- Monte Blue as Dan Morton
- Chester Gan as Captain Higoto
- Richard Loo as First Officer Miyuma
- Keye Luke as Steamship Office Clerk
- Rudy Robles as Filipino Assassin
- Spencer Chan as Chief Engineer Mitsuko
- Frank Mayo as Trial Judge Advocate
- Philip Ahn as Man in Theatre (uncredited)
- Anthony Caruso as Taxi Driver (uncredited)
- William Hopper as Orderly (uncredited)
- Jack Mower as Major (uncredited)

== Production ==
On Dec. 20, 1941, The New York Times reported the sale of Robert Carson's story "Aloha Means Goodbye", which was originally published in The Saturday Evening Post, for $12,500.

After the hiatus caused by the attack on Pearl Harbor, production resumed on March 2, 1942, and filming continued through May 2, 1942 (including retakes). The film opened in New York City on September 4, 1942.

Colonel J. G. Taylor was technical advisor for the court-martial scene that opens the film.

Turner Classic Movies' Bret Wood reports that John Huston created the effect of being on the ocean by having the set of the ship's deck built on a platform supported by hydraulic lifts to keep everything moving. In some of the interior shots, “The camera subtly, almost imperceptibly, edges toward and away from the actors, providing a vaguely disorienting effect that well serves the film's ever-shifting moral ground.”

=== Music ===
Adolph Deutsch turned the Engineers Hymn (as played to the tune of “The Son of a Gambolier”) into an evocative theme for the character of Richard Leland (Humphrey Bogart). A few poignant measures of West Point's “Alma Mater” are also heard after the court-martial, when Leland looks at his class ring and puts it back on his finger.

=== Changing directors ===
Director Huston was called up by the Army Service Forces Signal Corps during filming. In a later interview, he claimed that he deliberately left Leland tied up and held at gunpoint in a cliff-hanger set up for his replacement to solve. Vincent Sherman took over on April 22, 1942, and finished directing the film (minus the script that Huston had taken with him, explaining "Bogie will know how to get out"). Afterwards, Huston declared that Sherman's solution to the problem "lacked credibility“. The studio's solution to the problem was to discard Huston's footage of the impossible dilemma and write a new scenario.

=== Effect of internment ===
TCM reports that Mary Astor later recalled that the constantly expanding internment of Japanese Americans ordered by President Franklin D. Roosevelt on March 3, 1942, deprived Japanese actors of their jobs on the film. The file on Across the Pacific in the USC Cinema-Television Library shows that ethnically Chinese actors were cast as the Japanese characters from the beginning. Aside from technical advisor Dan Fujiwara and “a few bit players”, there were no ethnically Japanese participants in Across the Pacific.

== Reception ==
Variety commented, “Although the picture does not quite hit the edge-of-seat tension engendered by Maltese Falcon, it's a breezy and fast-paced melodrama. Huston directs deftly from thrill-packed script by Macauley.”

On Sept. 5, 1942, Bosley Crowther of The New York Times praised Huston's direction, writing “he has made a spy picture this time which tingles with fearful uncertainties and glints with the sheen of blue steel... (taking) his audience right into the picture by artful camera work dependent on close-ups... He never lets you know for certain just which way a character is going to jump...With these deceptive characters, with excellent dialogue and realistic mise en scéne, Mr. Huston has given the Warners a delightfully fear-jerking picture. It's like having a knife at your ribs for an hour and a half.”

== Radio adaptation ==
Across the Pacific was adapted as a radio play on The Screen Guild Theater's January 25, 1943, broadcast with Bogart, Astor and Sydney Greenstreet reprising their film roles.

== Real unit ==
The opening scene shows 198th Coast Artillery Command at Governors Island, New York City. In fact the 198th Coast Artillery Regiment was stationed at Wilmington, Delaware.

== Box office ==
According to Warner Bros. records, the film earned $1,381,000 domestically and $994,000 in overseas markets.

== See also ==
- John Huston filmography
