= Flight Angels =

- Theatrical release poster
- Directed by: Lewis Seiler
- Written by: Jerry Wald; Richard Macaulay
- Screenplay by: Maurice Leo
- Produced by: Edmund Grainger; Bryan Foy (Executive producer, uncredited)
- Starring: Virginia Bruce; Dennis Morgan; Wayne Morris; Ralph Bellamy
- Cinematography: L. William O'Connell
- Edited by: James Gibbon
- Music by: Heinz Roemheld (uncredited)
- Distributed by: Warner Bros.-First National Pictures
- Release date: May 18, 1940
- Running time: 74 minutes
- Country: United States
- Language: English

Flight Angels is a 1940 commercial aviation film from Warner Bros. Pictures, produced by Edmund Grainger and directed by Lewis Seiler, from an original story by Jerry Wald and Richard Macaulay. The film stars Virginia Bruce, Dennis Morgan, Wayne Morris, and Ralph Bellamy as airline employees, flying Douglas Sleepter Transport (DST) airliners.

The basic premise of the film follows the operational conditions of a commercial airline, while also following its stewardesses and pilots as they go through their daily routines, punctuated with the details of their personal lives. Real-life events such as the development of US commercial aviation in pre-WWII war years are featured but the underlying story of US military aviation preparation is also evident.

== Plot ==
"Ace" commercial airline pilot Chick Faber (Dennis Morgan) is grounded by Flight Superintendent Bill Graves (Ralph Bellamy) when a flight physical reveals that his eyesight is failing. Aided by stewardess Mary Norvell (Virginia Bruce) and her friend, Nan Hudson (Jane Wyman), Graves persuades Chick to take a job as teacher in the school for stewardesses. While he remains at the airline, along with engineer, Artie Dixon (Wayne Morris), he continues work on the design of a secret research aircraft, he calls the "stratosphere ship" that will revolutionize commercial aviation by flying faster and higher than any current type.

After Farber and Norvell get married, he finds that teaching is too restrictive and yearns to get back to his secret project. When he learns that the US Army Air Corps is going to test his aircraft, he attempts to get permission to make the first flight, but is refused due to his failing eyesight. Coming back after hours, Farber takes off and puts his secret aircraft through a high altitude test although Graves warns him by radio that the aircraft is too dangerous to fly without further development. At height, windows blow in and Farber barely recovers from going unconscious and pulling out of a high-speed dive, to make a crash landing back at his base.

Angrily giving up his pilot's license, he decides to leave his wife and join the newly formed Chinese mercenary air force fighting against Japan. Air Corps officers intercept him in San Francisco and call him back to active duty in the military to keep the secret of the "stratosphere ship" in US hands. Graves rearranges Mary's flight schedule, sending her to San Antonio, where she is met by newly promoted Capt. Farber, now a flight instructor at Randolph Field. The reunited couple are finally at peace, knowing that everything will turn out all right.

== Cast ==
As appearing in screen credits (main roles identified):

- Virginia Bruce as Mary Norvell
- Dennis Morgan as Chick Farber
- Wayne Morris as Artie Dixon
- Ralph Bellamy as Bill Graves
- Jane Wyman as Nan Hudson
- John Litel as Dr. Barclay
- Margot Stevenson as Rita
- Dorothea Kent as Mabel
- John Ridgely as Lt. Parsons
- Lucile Fairbanks as Thelma
- Maris Wrixon as Bonnie
- Jan Clayton as Jane Morrow
- Lynn Merrick as Marilyn (as Marilyn Merrick)
- Phyllis Hamilton as Phyllis
- Carol Hughes as "Texas"

== Production ==
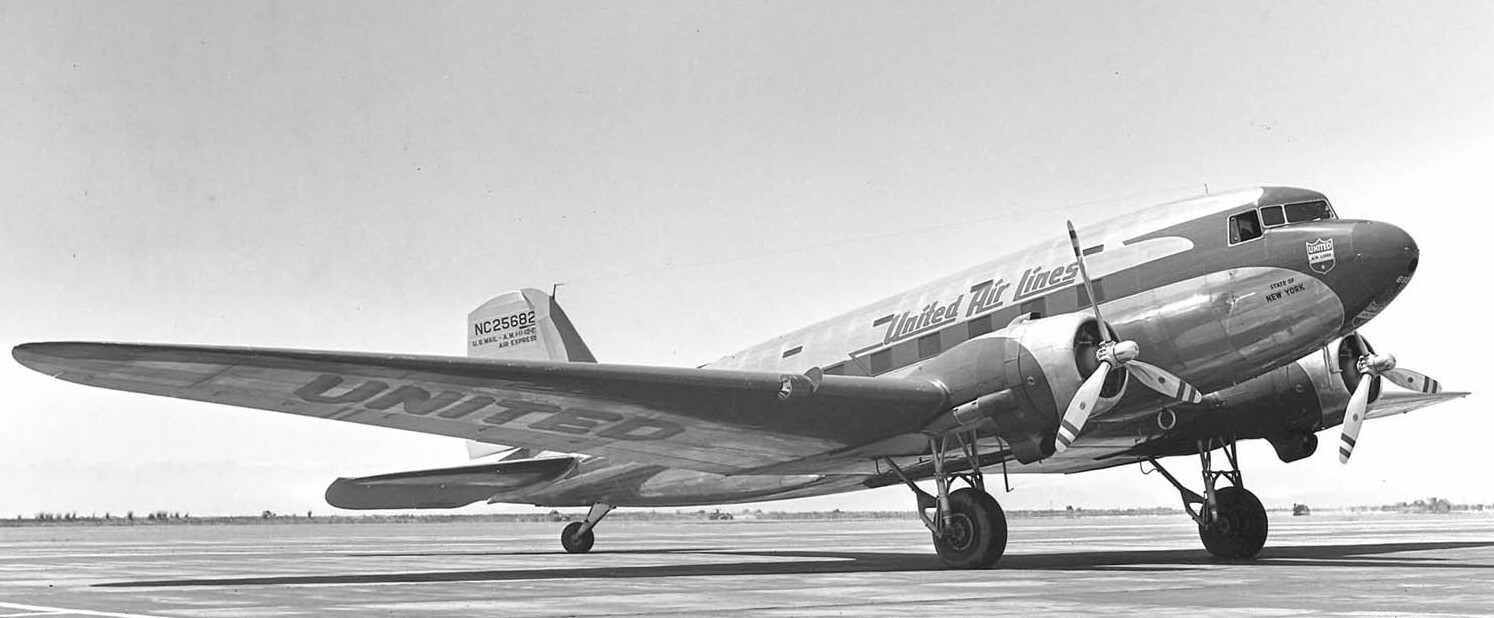
Douglas Sleeper Transport (DST) showing the second row of windows for the upper bunk beds, above the airline titles

The use of American Airlines Douglas Sleepter Transport, the initial variant of the ubiquitous Douglas DC-3 airliner, that had accommodations for 24 passengers during day and fitted out with 16 sleeper berths in the cabin for night, gave an air of authenticity to the film.

Principal photography consisting of aerial shots and exteriors took place at Burbank Airport, California. Although a mix of studio mock-ups, real aircraft and model work was used effectively, the stock footage of DC-3s at the beginning of the film led to Flagship Illinois becoming Flagship Tennessee as the airliner begins to taxi from the gate and then becomes the Flagship Illinois again as passengers are leaving after a bumpy landing, necessitated by the birth of a baby on board.

The cast was made up of a large group of both rising and falling stars who were not typical of a lesser film. While filming Flight Angels in 1940, Wayne Morris became interested in flying and became a naval aviator. When war was imminent, Morris joined the Naval Reserve and became a Navy flier in 1942, leaving his film career behind for the duration of the war. Flying the Grumman F6F Hellcat off the aircraft carrier USS Essex, Morris shot down seven Japanese aircraft and contributed to the sinking of five ships. While in wartime service, Morris was awarded four Distinguished Flying Crosses and two Air Medals.

When Airman Dixon joins a Chinese mercenary air force the formation of the covertly US-backed Flying Tigers is being hinted at.

=== Aircraft ===
The film featured:

- Boeing 247 airliner (under the title credits, bearing the United Air Lines logo)
- Douglas DC-3/DST airliners (in American Airlines "Flagship" livery)
- Lockheed Model 12A Electra Junior subbing for the "stratosphere ship." Lockheed 12A, registration number NC17342, was owned by Lang Transportation, Las Vegas, Nevada, and was also used in the 1937 Metro-Goldwyn-Mayer film Rosalie, Happy Landing (1938) and Secret Service of the Air (1938). (Note: NC17342, also known as X17342, became CF-BRK, served as RCAF 7653, before going back to American registry as NC17342, later N83U and N505.)

== Reception ==
Considered only a "B" film, Flight Angels has been decried in contemporary reviews as demeaning to women and stereotypical in its treatment of pilots and aviators.
