= The Roaring Twenties =

1939 crime film by Raoul Walsh

- Theatrical release poster
- Directed by: Raoul Walsh
- Written by: Jerry Wald; Richard Macaulay; Robert Rossen
- Based on: The World Moves On (1938) by Mark Hellinger
- Produced by: Hal B. Wallis; Samuel Bischoff
- Starring: James Cagney; Priscilla Lane; Humphrey Bogart; Gladys George
- Cinematography: Ernest Haller
- Edited by: Jack Killifer
- Music by: Ray Heindorf; Heinz Roemheld
- Distributed by: Warner Bros. Pictures
- Release date: October 28, 1939
- Running time: 107 minutes
- Country: United States
- Language: English

The Roaring Twenties is a 1939 American gangster film directed by Raoul Walsh and starring James Cagney, Priscilla Lane, Humphrey Bogart, and Gladys George. The film, spanning the period from 1919 to 1933, was written by Jerry Wald, Richard Macaulay and Robert Rossen. The film follows three men and their experiences during major events in the 1920s, such as Prohibition era violence and the 1929 stock market crash.

The picture was based on "The World Moves On", a short story by Mark Hellinger, a columnist who had been hired by Jack L. Warner to write screenplays. The movie is hailed as a classic in the gangster movie genre, and considered an homage to the classic gangster movie of the early 1930s.

The Roaring Twenties was the third and last film that Cagney and Bogart made together. The other two were Angels with Dirty Faces (1938) and The Oklahoma Kid (1939).

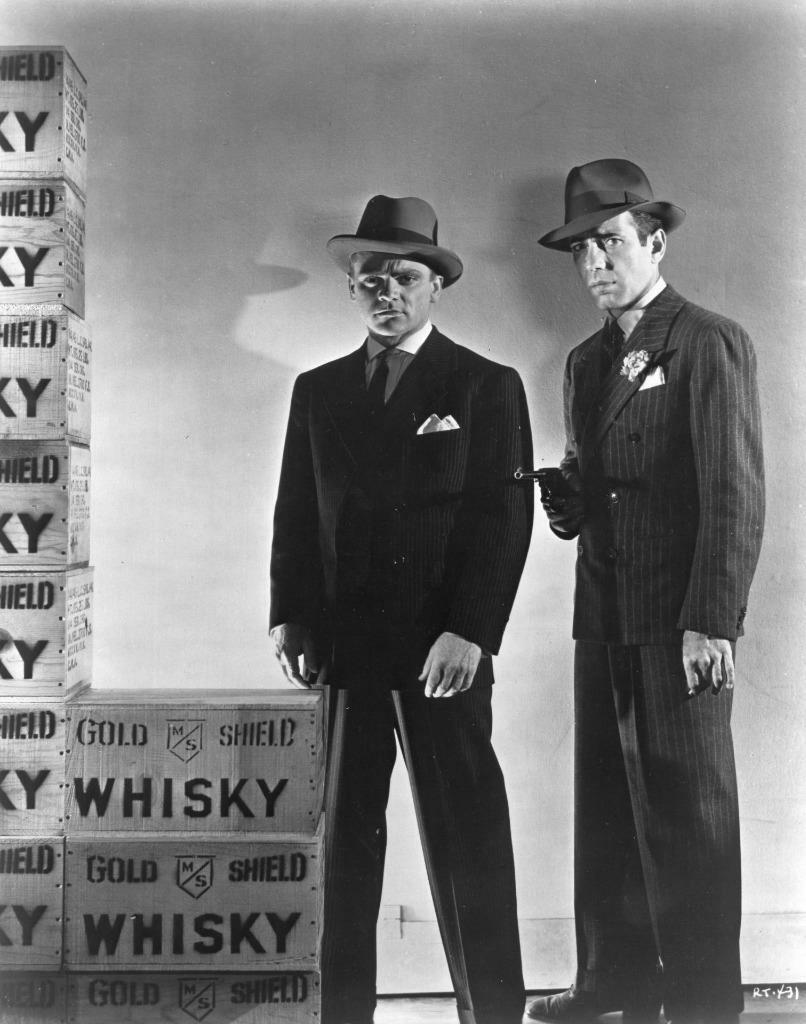
James Cagney and Humphrey Bogart

== Plot ==
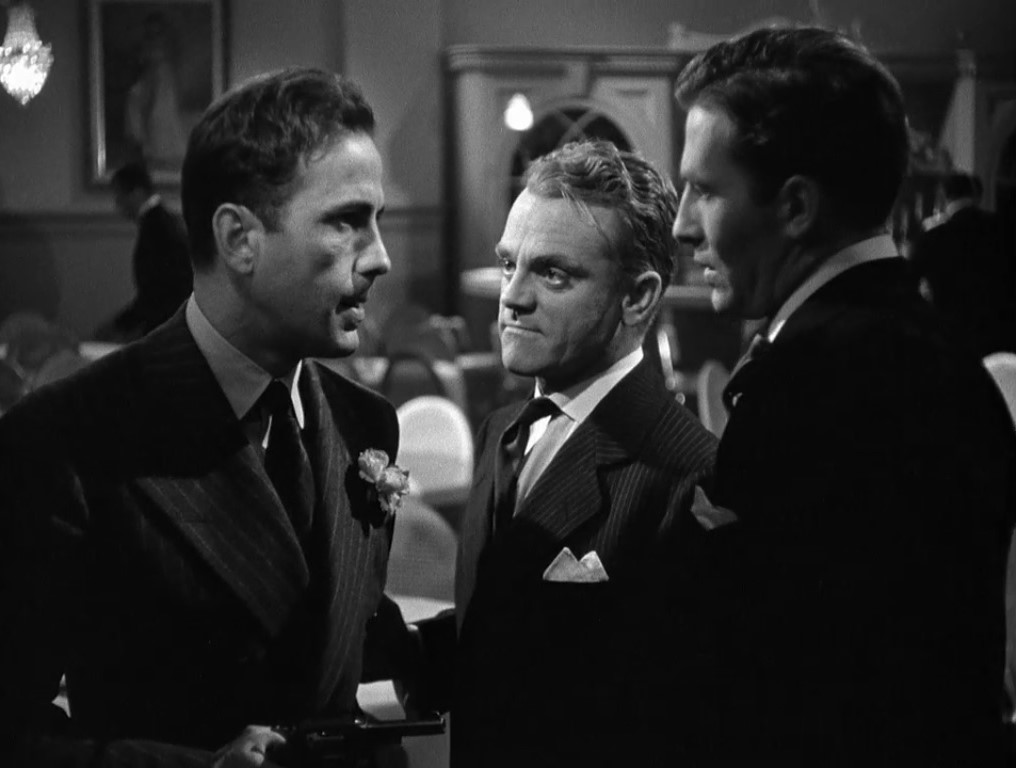
Humphrey Bogart, James Cagney and Jeffrey Lynn

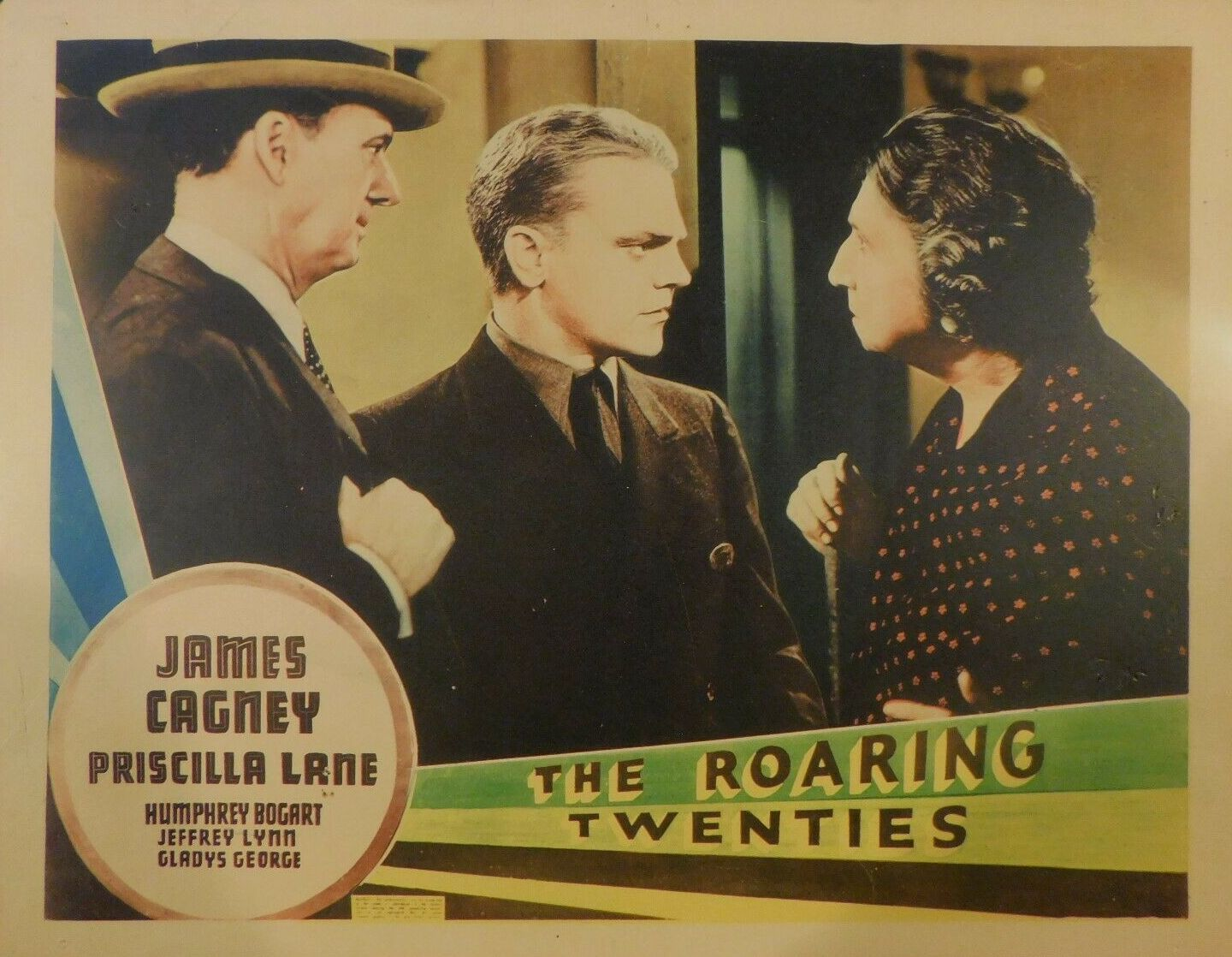
Lobby card with James Cagney

Eddie Bartlett, George Hally, and Lloyd Hart meet each other in a foxhole during the final days of World War I. Following the war's end, Lloyd starts his law practice, George becomes a bootlegger, and Eddie becomes a cab driver. While unknowingly delivering a package of liquor to Panama Smith, Eddie is arrested. Eddie helps secure an acquittal for Panama, who in gratitude provides money to pay Eddie's fine. They go into the bootlegging business together. Eddie uses a fleet of cabs to deliver his liquor, and he hires Lloyd as his lawyer to handle his legal issues. He encounters Jean Sherman, a girl he formerly corresponded with during the war, and gets her a job singing in Panama's club. Eddie wants Jean as his wife, giving her an engagement ring that he asks her to hold until he's saved up enough money to quit the criminal rackets.

Eddie and his henchmen hijack a shipment of liquor belonging to fellow bootlegger Nick Brown who had refused to cooperate with him. In charge of the liquor shipment is George, who proposes that Eddie bring him in as a partner. Eddie agrees and back home they inform the authorities about one of Brown's liquor shipments. After the shipment is confiscated, Eddie and George raid the warehouse and steal it. As they are leaving, George recognizes one of the watchmen as his former sergeant that he disliked and murders him. After learning of the murder, Lloyd cuts ties with George, who then threatens to kill Lloyd if he informs on them. As the bootlegging rackets prosper, Eddie sends his friend Danny to arrange a truce with Brown, but Danny's corpse is dropped off in front of Panama's club. Eddie goes after Brown, but George, resentful of Eddie's increasing power, tips off Brown, who sets a trap. A gunfight ensues, and Eddie manages to kill Brown. Suspecting George's betrayal but unable to prove it, Eddie dissolves their partnership.

Eddie soon discovers that Jean has never really loved him, and is in fact in love with Lloyd. Subsequently, after investing in the stock market, Eddie's bootlegging empire crumbles in the 1929 crash, and he is forced to sell his cab company to George at a price far below its value. George mockingly leaves Eddie one cab for himself, stating that Eddie will soon be forced to go back to being a cab driver.

One day, Jean hails Eddie's cab and he renews his acquaintance with her and with Lloyd, meeting their young son. Lloyd now works at the district attorney's office and is preparing a case against George. The encounter leaves Eddie despondent as he still harbors feelings towards Jean, and he becomes an alcoholic.

When Jean discovers that George is planning to have Lloyd killed, she appeals to Eddie for help. He initially declines, but ultimately decides to go to George's house to ask him to have mercy on the couple. When he arrives, George mocks him for his shabby looks and then decides to have him killed as he believes that Eddie will inform on him in order to help Jean. A shootout ensues in which Eddie kills George and some of his men.

After running outside, Eddie is shot by one of George's men and collapses on the steps of a nearby church. As the police arrest the remainder of George's gang, Panama runs to Eddie and cradles his lifeless body. When a police officer begins inquiring about who Eddie was, she replies, "He used to be a big shot."

== Cast ==
Credited Cast

- James Cagney as Eddie Bartlett
- Priscilla Lane as Jean Sherman
- Humphrey Bogart as George Hally
- Gladys George as Panama Smith
- Jeffrey Lynn as Lloyd Hart
- Frank McHugh as Danny Green
- George Meeker as Harold Masters
- Paul Kelly as Nick Brown
- Elisabeth Risdon as Mrs. Sherman
- Edward Keane as Pete Henderson
- Joseph Sawyer as Sergeant Pete Jones
- Abner Biberman as Lefty
- John Hamilton as Judge
- Robert Elliott as First Detective
- Eddie Chandler as Second Detective
- Vera Lewis as Mrs. Gray
- John Deering as the Narrator

Uncredited Cast

- Elliott Sullivan as Eddie's Cellmate
- Patrick H. O'Malley Jr. as Jailer
- Bert Hanlon as Piano accompanist
- Joseph Crehan as Mr. Fletcher, the Foreman
- Murray Alper as First Mechanic
- Dick Wessel as Second Mechanic
- George Humbert as Luigi, Restaurant Proprietor
- Ben Welden as Tavern Proprietor
- Clay Clement as Bramfield, the Broker
- Don Thaddeus Kerr as Bobby Hart
- Ray Cook as an Orderly
- Norman Willis as Bootlegger
- Arthur Loft as Proprietor of Still
- Al Hill, Raymond Bailey, and Lew Harvey as Ex-Cons
- Joe Devlin and Jeffrey Sayre as Order-Takers
- Paul Phillips as Mike
- Bert Hanlon as Piano Player
- Jack Norton as Drunk
- Alan Bridge as Captain
- Fred Graham as Henchman
- James Blaine as Doorman
- Henry C. Bradley and Lottie Williams as Couple in Restaurant
- John Harron as Soldier
- Lee Phelps as Bailiff
- Nat Carr as Waiter
- Wade Boteler as Policeman
- Creighton Hale as Customer
- Ann Codee as Saleswoman
- Eddie Acuff, Milton Kibbee, and John Ridgely as Cab Drivers
- Leo White as Nightclub Patron
- Frank Mayo
- Bess Flowers as Nightclub Patron
- Frank Wilcox as Cabbie at Grand Central
- Oscar O'Shea as Customer
- Robert Armstrong as Hatted Passerby before Nightclub
- James Flavin as Policeman
- Emory Parnell as Gangster

== Production ==
The film's trailer

Gladys George replaced Ann Sheridan who had replaced Lee Patrick who had replaced Glenda Farrell for the character of Panama Smith.

Anatole Litvak was the original director.

The soundtrack arranged by Ray Heindorf showcases the quintessential Warner Brothers catalog of early 20th century popular tunes; of which Priscilla Lane gets to sing at least three onscreen in character as a nightclub chanteuse.

== Reception ==
In 2008, the American Film Institute nominated the film for its Top 10 Gangster Films list.

The review aggregator Rotten Tomatoes reports that 100% of critics have given the film a positive review, based on 14 reviews.

== In popular culture ==
The Carol Burnett Show parodied the movie as "The Boring Twenties", with Carol Burnett parodying the Panama Smith character as Havana Jones.
