= Going Places (1938 film) =

1938 film by Ray Enright

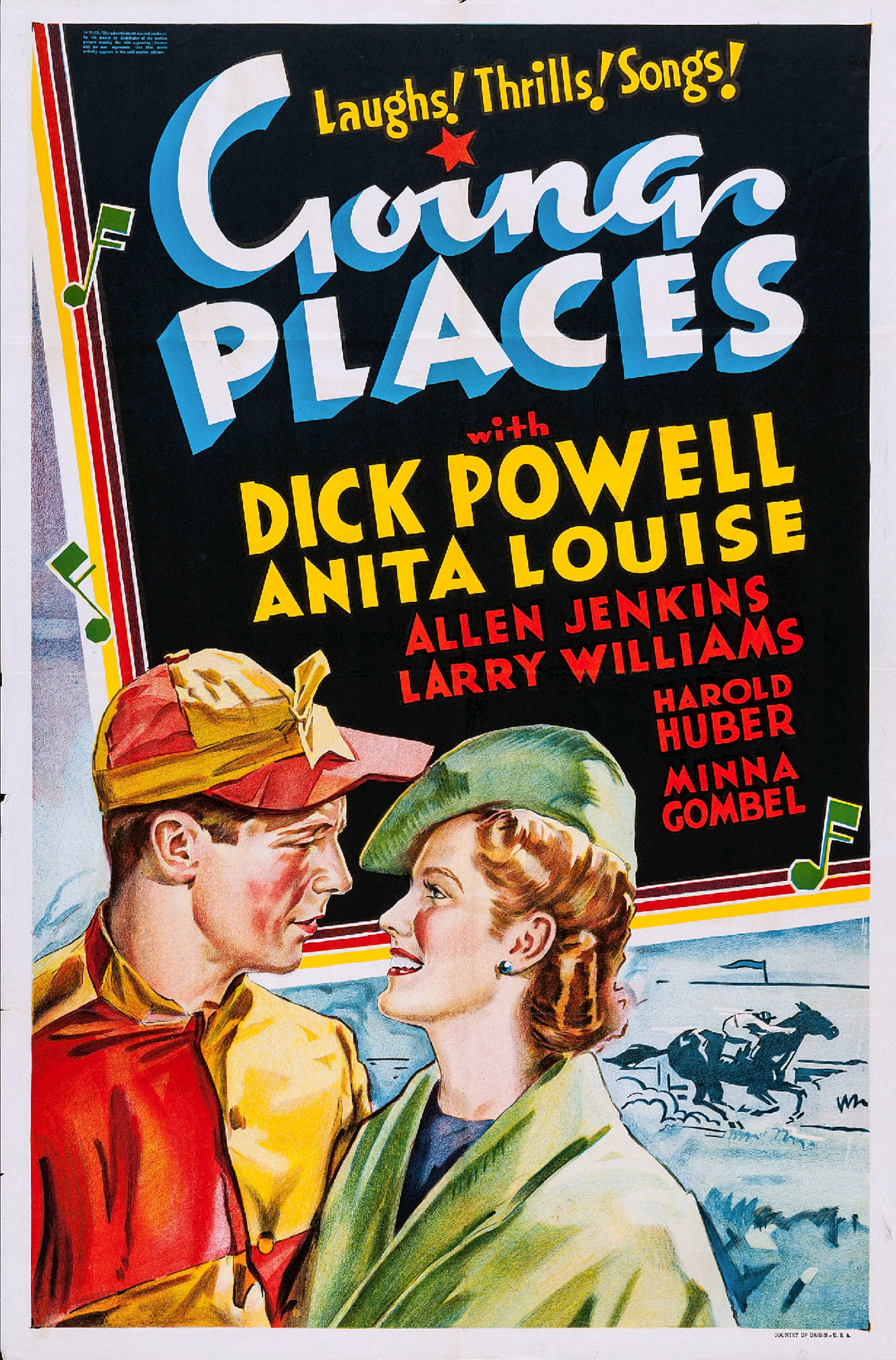
- Film poster
- Directed by: Ray Enright
- Screenplay by: Sig Herzig; Jerry Wald; Maurice Leo; Earl Baldwin
- Based on: The Hottentot; 1920 play by William Collier Sr. Victor Mapes
- Produced by: Jack L. Warner; Hal B. Wallis
- Starring: Dick Powell; Anita Louise
- Cinematography: Arthur L. Todd
- Edited by: Clarence Kolster
- Music by: Leo F. Forbstein
- Production company: Warner Bros. Pictures
- Distributed by: Warner Bros. Pictures
- Release date: December 31, 1938
- Running time: 84 minutes
- Country: United States
- Language: English

Going Places is a 1938 American musical comedy film starring Dick Powell and Anita Louise, and directed by Ray Enright. Powell plays a sporting goods salesman who is forced to pose as a famous horseman as part of his scheme to boost sales, ending up entangled in lies and having to ride a bucking horse in a steeplechase championship.

The film was nominated for the Academy Award for Best Original Song for "Jeepers Creepers", introduced by Louis Armstrong, whose character sings and plays it to a horse.

Two earlier films, The Hottentot (1922) and The Hottentot (1929), were adapted from the same 1920 play of that name.

== Plot ==
A sports store clerk poses as a famous jockey as an advertising stunt, but gets more than he bargained for.

== Cast ==
- Dick Powell as Peter Mason
- Anita Louise as Ellen Parker
- Allen Jenkins as "Droopy"
- Ronald Reagan as Jack Withering
- Walter Catlett as Franklin Dexter
- Harold Huber as Maxie Miller
- Larry Williams as Frank Kendall
- Thurston Hall as Col. Harvey Withering
- Minna Gombell as Cora Withering
- Joyce Compton as The Colonel's Mistress
- Robert Warwick as Walter Frome
- John Ridgely as Desk Clerk
- Joe Cunningham as Hotel Night Clerk
- Eddie "Rochester" Anderson as George
- George Reed as Withering's Butler
- Louis Armstrong as Gabriel the Trainer
- Maxine Sullivan as Specialty Singer

== Production ==
The Dandridge Sisters appear unbilled, as singers in a large production number.

== Accolades ==
The song "Jeepers Creepers" was nominated for the American Film Institute list AFI's 100 Years...100 Songs.

Johnny Mercer and Harry Warren won an Oscar nomination for Best Song for "Jeepers Creepers". The song later would be sung in Yankee Doodle Dandy (1942), The Day of the Locust (1975), The Cheap Detective (1978) and the horror thriller Jeepers Creepers (2001).

== See also ==
- List of films about horses
- List of films about horse racing
