= Adolph Deutsch =

British-American composer, conductor and arranger

- Born: Adolph Charles Sander Deutsch; 20 October 1897; London, England
- Died: 1 January 1980 (aged 82) Palm Desert, California, U.S.
- Occupation: Composer
- Years active: 1914–1961

Adolph Sender Charles Deutsch (20 October 1897 – 1 January 1980) was a British-American composer, conductor and arranger.

Born in London, England, he immigrated to the United States in 1911, and settled in Buffalo, New York. His parents, Alex (Alexander) Deutsch and Dena née Gerst, were German Jews.

In 1914, Deutsch was "a Buffalo movie house musician", accompanying silent films. Deutsch began his composing career on Broadway in the 1920s and 1930s, and arranged for several American dance bands such as Paul Whiteman and Paul Ash before working for Hollywood films beginning in the late 1930s. For Broadway, he orchestrated Irving Berlin's As Thousands Cheer and George and Ira Gershwin's Pardon My English.

Deutsch won Oscars for his background music for Oklahoma! (1955), and for conducting the music for Seven Brides for Seven Brothers (1954) and Annie Get Your Gun (1950). He was nominated for The Band Wagon (1953) and the 1951 film version of Show Boat, for which he conducted the orchestra. For Broadway and Hollywood, he conducted, composed and arranged music, but did not write songs, not even for the Broadway shows on which he worked. In addition to his music for westerns and his conducting of the scores for musicals, Deutsch composed for films noir, including The Mask of Dimitrios (1944), The Maltese Falcon (1941), and Nobody Lives Forever (1946), as well as Little Women (the 1949 adaptation), and the Billy Wilder comedies Some Like It Hot (1959), and The Apartment (1960). His final film was Go Naked in the World.

Deutsch died of heart failure in Palm Desert, California, on 1 January 1980, at the age of 82.

== Filmography ==
- 1937 They Won't Forget
- 1937 The Great Garrick
- 1938 Swing Your Lady
- 1938 Racket Busters
- 1938 Valley of the Giants
- 1938 Heart of the North
- 1939 Off the Record
- 1939 The Kid from Kokomo
- 1939 Indianapolis Speedway
- 1939 The Angels Wash Their Faces
- 1939 Espionage Agent
- 1940 The Fighting 69th
- 1940 Castle on the Hudson
- 1940 Three Cheers for the Irish
- 1940 Saturday's Children
- 1940 Torrid Zone
- 1940 They Drive by Night
- 1940 Flowing Gold
- 1940 Tugboat Annie Sails Again
- 1940 East of the River
- 1941 All Through the Night
- 1941 The Maltese Falcon
- 1941 Manpower
- 1941 Kisses for Breakfast
- 1941 Underground
- 1941 Singapore Woman
- 1941 The Great Mr. Nobody
- 1941 High Sierra
- 1942 Lucky Jordan
- 1942 George Washington Slept Here
- 1942 You Can't Escape Forever
- 1942 Across the Pacific
- 1942 The Big Shot
- 1942 Juke Girl
- 1942 Larceny, Inc.
- 1943 Northern Pursuit
- 1943 Action in the North Atlantic
- 1944 The Doughgirls
- 1944 The Mask of Dimitrios
- 1944 Uncertain Glory
- 1945 Danger Signal
- 1945 Escape in the Desert
- 1946 Nobody Lives Forever
- 1946 Shadow of a Woman
- 1946 Three Strangers
- 1947 Blaze of Noon
- 1947 Ramrod
- 1948 Whispering Smith
- 1948 Julia Misbehaves
- 1949 Intruder in the Dust
- 1949 The Stratton Story (uncredited)
- 1949 Little Women
- 1950 Pagan Love Song (uncredited)
- 1950 Mrs. O'Malley and Mr. Malone
- 1950 Father of the Bride
- 1950 The Big Hangover
- 1950 Stars in My Crown
- 1951 Show Boat (uncredited)
- 1951 Soldiers Three
- 1952 Million Dollar Mermaid (uncredited)
- 1953 The Band Wagon (uncredited)
- 1953 Torch Song
- 1953 The Long, Long Trailer
- 1954 Seven Brides for Seven Brothers (uncredited)
- 1955 Interrupted Melody (uncredited)
- 1956 Tea and Sympathy
- 1956 The Rack
- 1958 The Matchmaker
- 1959 Some Like It Hot (background score)
- 1960 The Apartment
- 1961 Go Naked in the World
