= Hard to Get (1938 film) =

1938 film by Ray Enright

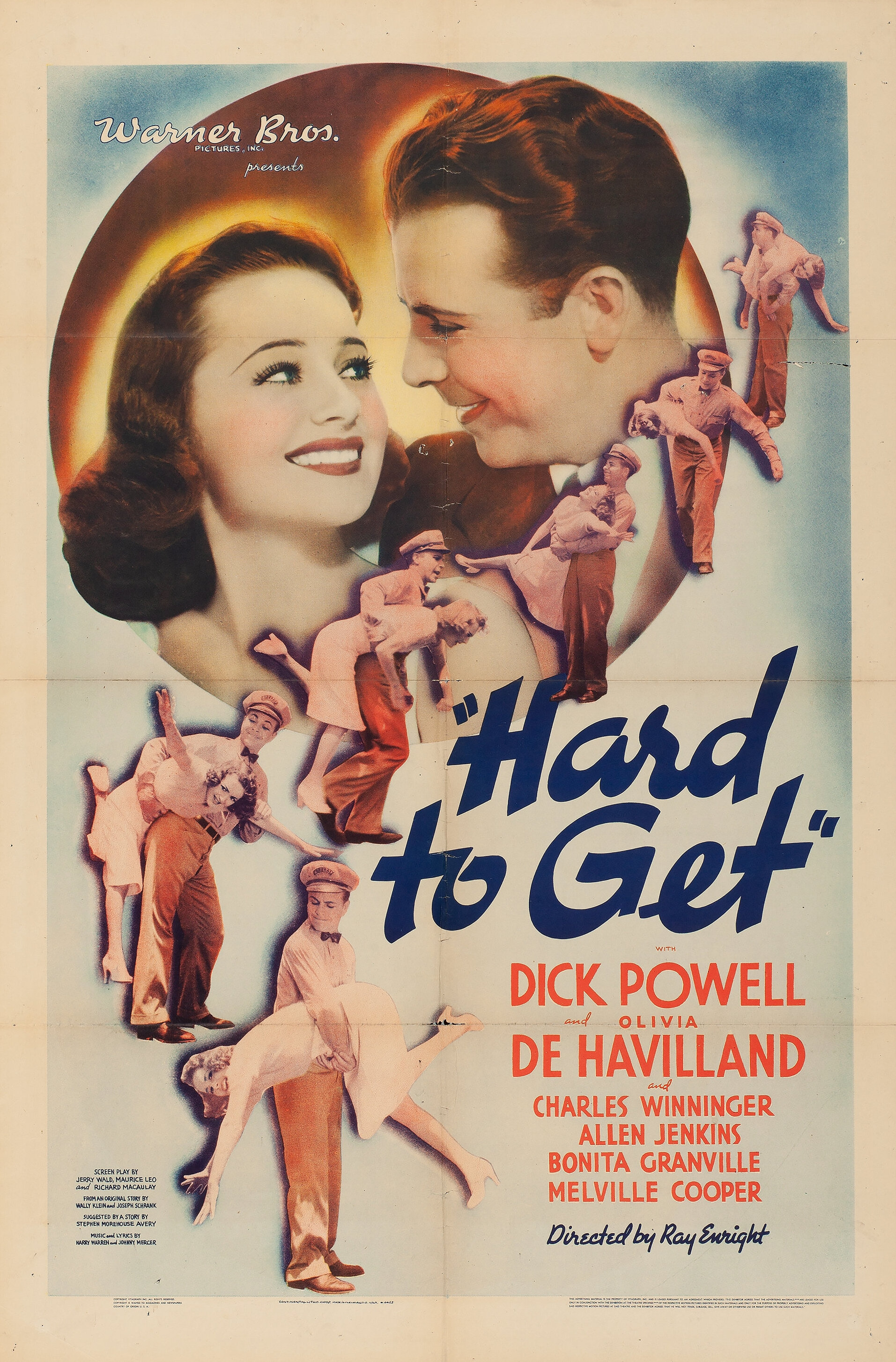
- Theatrical release poster
- Directed by: Ray Enright
- Screenplay by: Jerry Wald; Maurice Leo; Richard Macaulay
- Story by: Wally Kline; Joseph Schrank
- Based on: Stuffed Shirt; 1932 story in Hearst's International-Cosmopolitan by Stephen Morehouse Avery
- Produced by: Hal B. Wallis; Jack Warner; Samuel Bischoff
- Starring: Dick Powell; Olivia de Havilland
- Cinematography: Charles Rosher
- Edited by: Thomas Richards
- Music by: Heinz Eric Roemheld
- Production company: Warner Bros. Pictures
- Distributed by: Warner Bros. Pictures
- Release date: November 5, 1938 (USA)
- Running time: 82 minutes
- Country: United States
- Language: English

Hard to Get is a 1938 American romantic comedy film starring Dick Powell and Olivia de Havilland. Written by Jerry Wald, Maurice Leo, and Richard Macaulay, and directed by Ray Enright, the film is about a spoiled young heiress who tries to charge some gasoline at an auto court and is forced by the attendant to work out her bill by making beds and cleaning rooms. Resolving to get even, she pretends to have forgiven him, and then sends him to her father to get financing for his plan to develop a string of auto courts across the country, knowing he will only be wasting his time.

== Plot ==
The hectoring wife (Isabel Jeans) of New York oil magnate Ben Richards (Charles Winninger) is gathering her family for their annual summer vacation in Newport. Their spoiled willful and beautiful daughter Margaret (Olivia de Havilland) refuses to go and storms out of the house. Impetuously commandeering a modest car belonging to her father's valet, she soon notices the car is low on fuel and stops at an auto court gas station. The attendant, Bill Davis (Dick Powell), fills its tank and requests the $3.50 payment. With no money on her, Margaret tries to charge the amount to her father's account, but, doubting her identity, Bill matter of factly refuses. Instead, he offers to let her work off her debt by serving for the day as a housekeeper cleaning the auto court's bungalows. Outraged by this suggestion, Margaret attempts to drive off, but backs into a truck preventing her from leaving. When a police officer arrives, Margaret is forced to comply with Bill's offer and spends the next few hours making beds and cleaning rooms.

Margaret returns home vowing revenge on Bill for his treatment. At first she asks her father—who is on the board of the oil company that owns the station—to have Bill fired. After listening to her story, however, her father agrees with the way Bill handled things and tells her she'll have to find her own way of getting even. The next day, Margaret returns to the gas station and apologizes to Bill, pretending instead to be the wealthy family's maid, "Maggie". Impressed by her change in demeanor, and attracted again by her obvious charms, Bill asks her on a date and she accepts.

That night, Bill sneaks them into a banquet for a free dinner, then takes her up the Empire State Building, where he tells her about his dream of building a string of upscale auto courts across the country. Margaret tells him she thinks it's a great idea and sends him to her father to get financing for his plan—even providing him her father's old oilfield nickname "Spouter" so the secretaries will think he is one of Ben's old friends. Margaret knows that when her father learns that Bill used the nickname to pretend he was an old friend, he will make his life miserable.

As Margaret planned, Bill is given the runaround by Ben, who sends him off for even more by promising the support of his venture capitalist friend and business associate Atwater—neither of whom know that Margaret is behind the whole thing. When Ben discovers that his daughter planned the revenge pretending to be his maid, he invites Bill over to dinner for some fun at their expense. Maggie turns the tables by inducing the real maid to masquerade in her place. Still believing that Ben wants to help him, Bill shortly after sneaks into a party given by Atwater, where he finally discovers that Margaret, Ben, and Atwater have been making a fool of him. After telling them all off, Bill storms out of the party, not knowing that Margaret has fallen in love with him. Hoping to square things, she goes to the auto court but learns that as a result of all the time he has spent away from his job Bill has been fired from his position and dropped out of sight.

Realizing that Bill's national auto court plan has great potential, Ben and Atwater fight over who will finance the project, ultimately agreeing to be partners. They converge on the high-rise construction site where Bill is now working and offer to pay Bill a substantial fee to serve as their architect. Bill accepts. Sometime after, seeking forgiveness for what she's done, Margaret visits the auto court, which is being transformed into his new vision. Playing Cupid, Ben soon arrives with a judge who is prepared to marry them. Ben's wife appears and tries to prevent the wedding, but Bill rebuffs her and professes his desire to marry Margaret. Rapidly wed, couple pulls down the shade on one of the auto court bungalows to begin their honeymoon post haste.

== Cast ==
- Dick Powell as Bill
- Olivia de Havilland as Margaret
- Charles Winninger as Ben Richards
- Allen Jenkins as Roscoe
- Bonita Granville as Connie
- Melville Cooper as Case
- Isabel Jeans as Mrs. Richards
- Grady Sutton as Stanley Potter
- Thurston Hall as Atwater
- John Ridgely as Burke
- Penny Singleton as Hattie
- Granville Bates as Judge Harkness
- Jack Mower as Schaff

== Production ==
Powell, still deep in his crooner era, sings four tunes. Comic relief is provided by the running gag of Ben being bested in a wide variety of one-on-one sports competitions with Case, his valet, and some exaggerated flower fanciers at the banquet Bill and Maggie crash for a free meal.

== Release ==
Hard to Get was released by Warner Bros. Pictures in the United States on November 5, 1938.

== Songs ==
- "You Must Have Been a Beautiful Baby" (Harry Warren and Johnny Mercer) played during the opening and closing credits, sung by Dick Powell
- "There's a Sunny Side to Every Situation" (Harry Warren and Johnny Mercer) sung a cappella by Dick Powell
- "Love Is Where You Find It" (Harry Warren) played at the banquet when Bill tells Maggie of his plans
- "Sonny Boy" (Ray Henderson, Buddy G. DeSylva, and Lew Brown) played by the band at Atwater's and sung by Dick Powell in blackface referencing Al Jolson
- "Put That Down in Writing" (Harry Warren) played at the Atwater party when Bill gets wise to Maggie

== Accolades ==
"You Must Have Been a Beautiful Baby", introduced in the film, was nominated for the American Film Institute's 2004 list AFI's 100 Years...100 Songs.
