= Mark Hellinger =

American journalist, columnist, and film producer (1903–1947)

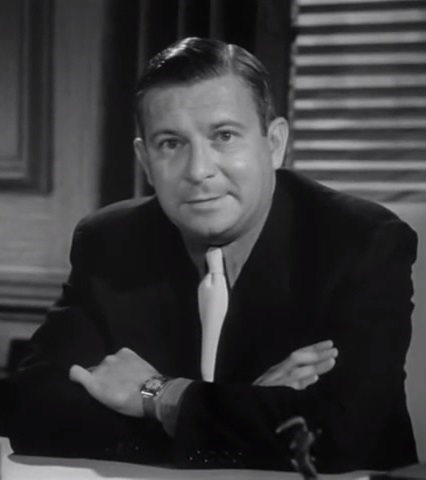
- Hellinger in the trailer for The Roaring Twenties, one of several films he produced
- Born: Mark John Hellinger; March 21, 1903; New York City, U.S.
- Died: December 21, 1947 (aged 44); Los Angeles, U.S.
- Resting place: Sleepy Hollow Cemetery, Sleepy Hollow, New York
- Occupations: Journalist; theatre columnist; film producer
- Years active: 1923–1947
- Spouse: Gladys Glad
- Awards: Edgar Award for Best Motion Picture

Mark John Hellinger (March 21, 1903 – December 21, 1947) was an American journalist, theatre columnist, and film producer.

== Biography ==
=== Early life ===
Hellinger was born into the Orthodox Jewish family of Mildred "Millie" (née Fitch) and Pol Hellinger in New York City, but in later life he became a non-practicing Jew. When he was 15, he organized a student strike at Townsend Harris High School and was expelled for his actions. This proved to be the end of his formal education.

In 1921, Hellinger began working as a waiter and cashier at a Greenwich Village nightclub in order to meet theatre people. He later was employed by Lane Bryant to write direct mail advertising for clothing for larger and pregnant women.

=== Journalist ===
The following year he began his journalistic career as a reporter for Zit's Weekly, a theatrical publication, where he remained for 18 months.

In 1923, Hellinger moved to the city desk of the New York Daily News. He wrote the play None Are So Blind (1923).

=== Short story writer ===
In July 1925, he was assigned About Town, a Sunday column his editors intended him to fill with news and gossip about Broadway theatre. Instead, he filled the space with short stories in the style of O. Henry. When his columns drew a considerable amount of fan mail, he was permitted to continue in this vein. Three years later he graduated to a daily feature called Behind the News. He numbered such personalities as Walter Winchell, Florenz Ziegfeld, Texas Guinan, Dutch Schultz, and Legs Diamond among his friends.

In November 1929, Hellinger moved to the New York Daily Mirror. While continuing to write daily and Sunday columns, he contributed sketches to the Ziegfeld Follies, wrote plays, published magazine articles, produced two collections of short stories, Moon Over Broadway (1931) and The Ten Million (1934), and co-wrote the screenplay for Broadway Bill with Robert Riskin.

Some films were based on his works including Justice for Sale (1932), the short I Know Everybody and Everybody's Racket (1934), Broadway Bill (1934), and Walking Down Broadway (1938).

== Hollywood ==
=== Writer ===
By 1937, Hellinger was a syndicated columnist featured in 174 newspapers. That same year he was hired as a writer/producer by Jack L. Warner.

He worked on the story for Racket Busters (1938) starring Humphrey Bogart and Comet Over Broadway (1938) and provided the story for the 1939 Raoul Walsh gangster film The Roaring Twenties starring James Cagney and Humphrey Bogart, basing it on his own experiences during that decade. In his onscreen foreword to the film, he wrote:

It may come to pass that, at some distant date, we will be confronted with another period similar to the one depicted in this photoplay. If that happens, I pray that the events, as dramatized here, will be remembered. In this film, the characters are composites of people I knew, and the situations are those that actually occurred. Bitter or sweet, most memories become precious as the years move on. This film is a memory - and I am grateful for it.

=== Producer ===
Hellinger began worked as a producer on B pictures such as The Adventures of Jane Arden (1939), Women in the Wind (1939), Hell's Kitchen (1939) and The Cowboy Quarterback (1939).

Hellinger also helped produce The Roaring Twenties (1939) starring James Cagney and Humphrey Bogart, his first "A" film. He produced Bs for a little bit longer: Kid Nightingale (1939), and British Intelligence (1940).

Then Hellinger established himself as a top level producer with It All Came True (1940) starring Ann Sheridan and featuring Bogart. He followed it with Torrid Zone (1940) starring Cagney and Sheridan, and Brother Orchid (1940) with Edward G. Robinson, Bogart and Sheridan.

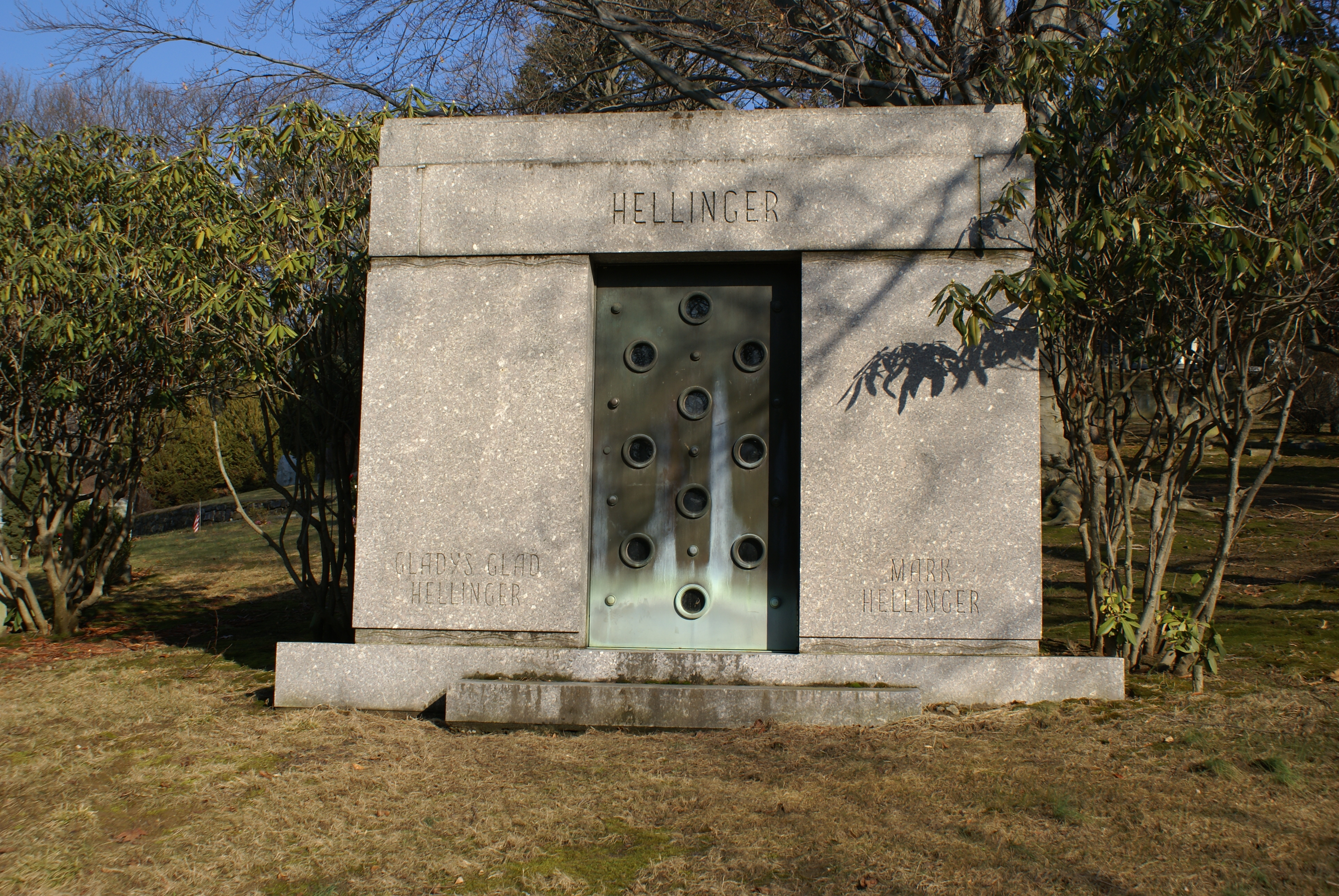
Burial site of Mark and Gladys Hellinger

Hellinger made four classics directed by Raoul Walsh: The Roaring Twenties (1939) with Cagney and Bogart; They Drive by Night (1940) with George Raft, Sheridan, Bogart, and Ida Lupino; High Sierra (1941) with Lupino and Bogart; and Manpower (1941) with Robinson, Marlene Dietrich and Raft. He made a comedy titled Affectionately Yours (1941) with Merle Oberon and Rita Hayworth.

Hellinger went over to 20th Century Fox to make two films: Rise and Shine (1942), a musical, and Moontide (1942) with Jean Gabin, Lupino, Thomas Mitchell and Claude Rains.

Due to a congenital heart condition, Hellinger repeatedly was rejected for active service during World War II. Instead, he briefly worked as a war correspondent, writing human interest stories about the troops.

Back at Warners, he produced the all-star musical revue Thank Your Lucky Stars (1943) and made Between Two Worlds (1944), The Doughgirls (1944), and The Horn Blows at Midnight (1945).

=== Universal ===
Hellinger set up at Universal, where he had his own producing unit. He had a big hit with The Killers (1946) which made stars of both Burt Lancaster and Ava Gardner. He followed it with Swell Guy (1946) with Sonny Tufts, The Two Mrs. Carrolls (1947) with Bogart back at Warners, Brute Force, and The Naked City, which he also narrated. The last film was released several weeks after Hellinger's death, and in his review for the New York Times, Bosley Crowther called it "a virtual Hellinger column on film" and "his appropriate valedictory" and observed, "The late Mark Hellinger's personal romance with the City of New York was one of the most ecstatic love affairs of the modern day — at least, to his host of friends and readers who are skeptics regarding l'amour. Before he became a film producer and was still just a newspaper scribe, Mr. Hellinger went for Manhattan in a blissfully uninhibited way — for its sights and sounds and restless movements, its bizarre people and its equally bizarre smells. And he made quite a local reputation framing his fancies in flowery billets doux which stirred the hearts and the humors of readers of the tabloid press."

Hellinger won the 1947 Edgar Award for Best Motion Picture for The Killers.

== Personal life and death ==
In 1926, Hellinger was one of the judges for a beauty contest sponsored by the Daily News. The winner was Ziegfeld showgirl Gladys Glad, and on July 11, 1929, the two were wed. She divorced him in 1932, but after a year the two remarried on the same date as their original wedding, and they remained wed until his death at age 44 from a coronary thrombosis in Cedars of Lebanon Hospital in Los Angeles. He was buried in a private mausoleum at Sleepy Hollow Cemetery in Sleepy Hollow, New York on Christmas Eve.

== Legacy ==
In January 1949, the 51st Street Theatre, a Broadway theater in Manhattan, was renamed the Mark Hellinger Theatre in his honor. In 1989, the venue was converted into the Times Square Church.

The Hellinger Award annually acknowledges the accomplishments of St. Bonaventure University's most promising young journalism student. It was established in 1960 by columnist Jim Bishop in memory of his mentor. Bishop also wrote a biography of Hellinger entitled The Mark Hellinger Story: A Biography of Broadway and Hollywood. The composer Miklós Rózsa, who had scored The Killers, Brute Force, and The Naked City, was particularly devoted to Hellinger and dedicated his suite of music from those films (Mark Hellinger Suite or Background to Violence) to the producer's memory. See Rózsa, Double Life, 2nd ed., 1989, pp. 153–154.
