= Sig Herzig =

American screenwriter and playwright

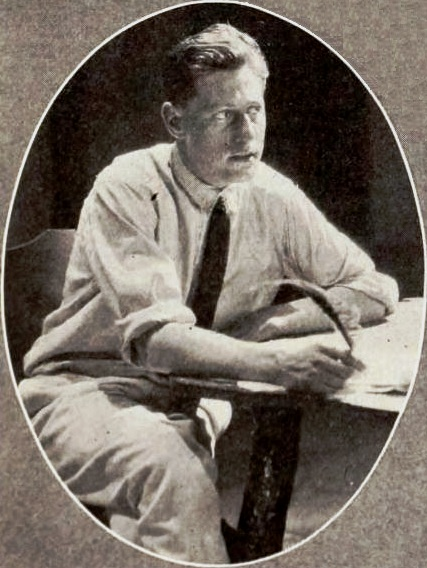
- From a 1921 magazine
- Born: Siegfried Maurice Herzig; July 25, 1897; New York City, New York
- Died: March 12, 1985 (aged 87); Thousand Oaks, California
- Occupation: Screenwriter
- Years active: 1922-1961

Sig Herzig (born Siegfried Maurice Herzig; July 25, 1897 – March 12, 1985) was an American screenwriter and playwright.

== Biography ==
Born Siegfried Maurice Herzig in New York City, Herzig began his career as the director of the comedy short Husband and Strife (1922), but he switched gears to create plot lines for more than three dozen silent films. His later screen credits included the screenplays for Artists and Models (1937), Marry the Girl (1937), On Your Toes (1939), Sunny (1941), I Dood It (1943), Brewster's Millions (1945), London Town (1946), and Three on a Spree (1961), another adaptation of Brewster's Millions.

Herzig's Broadway theatre credits included The Vanderbilt Revue (1930), Shoot the Works (1931), Ballyhoo of 1932 (1932), Vickie (1942), and Bloomer Girl (1944). His television credits included Topper, Private Secretary, and Sugarfoot.

Sig Herzig died in Thousand Oaks, California on March 12, 1985, aged 87.

== Partial filmography ==
- Object: Alimony (1928)
- The Lone Wolf's Daughter (1929)
- Romance in the Rain (1934)
- Lottery Lover (1935)
- Broadway Gondolier (1935)
- Old Man Rhythm (1935)
- Millions in the Air (1935)
- Colleen (1936)
- Sing Me a Love Song (1936)
- Ready, Willing, and Able (1937)
- Artists and Models (1937)
- Marry the Girl (1937)
- Varsity Show (1937)
- Gold Diggers in Paris (1938)
- Four's a Crowd (1938)
- Going Places (1938)
- They Made Me a Criminal (1939)
- Indianapolis Speedway (1939)
- On Your Toes (1939)
- I Wanted Wings (1941)
- Sunny (1941)
- My Favorite Spy (1942)
- I Dood It (1943)
- Meet the People (1944)
- Brewster's Millions (1945)
- Where Do We Go from Here? (1945)
- London Town (1946)
- Three on a Spree (1961)
