= Double or Nothing (1940 film) =

- Directed by: Roy Mack
- Written by: Cyrus D. Wood; Eddie Forman
- Starring: Lee Dixon; The Hollywood Doubles; John Elliott; Tom Herbert; Ed Smalle
- Cinematography: Ray Foster
- Edited by: Bert Frank
- Music by: David Mendoza
- Distributed by: Warner Bros.
- Release date: April 20, 1940
- Running time: 18 minutes
- Country: United States
- Language: English

Double or Nothing is a 1940 American short comedy film directed by Roy Mack and starring Lee Dixon along with the real-life "doubles" of famous Hollywood actors. It was written by Cyrus D. Wood and Eddie Forman and released by Warner Brothers,

== Plot ==
The film's plot is similar to the Warners release Double or Nothing (1936), where an actor gets knocked out and dreams of actors "doubled" by their actual stand-ins.

== Cast ==
- Lee Dixon as Bill
- The Hollywood Doubles as Hollywood doubles
- Ed Smalle's Octet as cantina chorus
- John Elliott as cantina baritone

Tom Herbert appears as the double for his brother, comedian Hugh Herbert.
