= Three Cheers for the Irish =

- Theatrical release poster
- Directed by: Lloyd Bacon
- Screenplay by: Richard Macaulay; Jerry Wald
- Produced by: Samuel Bischoff
- Starring: Priscilla Lane; Thomas Mitchell; Dennis Morgan; Virginia Grey; Irene Hervey; Alan Hale, Sr.
- Cinematography: Charles Rosher
- Edited by: William Holmes
- Music by: Adolph Deutsch
- Production company: Warner Bros. Pictures
- Distributed by: Warner Bros. Pictures
- Release dates: March 9, 1940 (New York City); March 16, 1940 (United States)
- Running time: 99 minutes
- Country: United States
- Language: English

Three Cheers for the Irish is a 1940 comedy film directed by Lloyd Bacon, written by Richard Macaulay and Jerry Wald, and starring Priscilla Lane, Thomas Mitchell and Dennis Morgan. The supporting cast features Virginia Grey, Alan Hale, Sr. and William Lundigan. The plot involves a veteran police officer (Mitchell) forced into retirement only to learn that his replacement (Morgan), whom he detests, is romancing his daughter (Lane). The film was released by Warner Bros. Pictures on March 16, 1940.

== Plot ==
Peter Casey is an Irish policeman in NYC with twenty five years on the force. He has three daughters Maureen, Pat, and Heloise. Maureen meets and falls in love with a Scottish policeman Angus Ferguson, Pat dates Ed Mckean, a wreaking supervisor who bores Peter and is a cheapskate, and Heloise who keeps time with a noted gambler- Joe Niklas. Peter unexpectedly gets retired after 25 years on the force and has to train Angus as his replacement to his disgust. Peter's police buddies buy him a rocking chair. In his retirement he get bored and has to deal with an overbearing friend, Gallagher. Worse, Angus has been dating Maureen behind his back. They even get married but keep it a secret. Over time Peter's friends run him for Alderman and despite Gallagher's overbearing help he wins the election. Peter, daughter and son-in-law work things when Maureen get pregnant. Angus chases Peter when as a good Catholic and Irishman runs looking for a priest to make the wedding official.

== Cast ==
- Priscilla Lane as Maureen Casey
- Thomas Mitchell as Peter Casey
- Dennis Morgan as Angus Ferguson
- Virginia Grey as Patricia Casey
- Irene Hervey as Heloise Casey
- Alan Hale, Sr. as Gallagher
- William Lundigan as Michael Flaherty
- Frank Jenks as Ed McKean
- Henry Armetta as Tony
- Morgan Conway as Joe Niklas
- Alec Craig as Callaghan
- J. M. Kerrigan as Scanlon
- Cliff Clark as Mara
- William B. Davidson as Police Commissioner
- Joe King as Police Captain
