= Garden of the Moon (film) =

1938 film by Busby Berkeley

- Theatrical release poster
- Directed by: Busby Berkeley
- Screenplay by: Jerry Wald; Richard Macaulay
- Based on: Garden of the Moon; 1937 story The Saturday Evening Post by H. Bedford-Jones; John Barton Browne
- Produced by: Louis F. Edelman
- Starring: Pat O'Brien; Margaret Lindsay; John Payne; Johnnie Davis; Melville Cooper; Isabel Jeans
- Cinematography: Tony Gaudio
- Edited by: George Amy
- Music by: Heinz Roemheld
- Production company: Warner Bros. Pictures
- Distributed by: Warner Bros. Pictures
- Release date: October 1, 1938
- Running time: 94 minutes
- Country: United States
- Language: English

Garden of the Moon is a 1938 American comedy film directed by Busby Berkeley and screenplay by Jerry Wald and story by Richard Macaulay. The film stars Pat O'Brien, Margaret Lindsay, John Payne, Johnnie Davis, Melville Cooper and Isabel Jeans. The film was released by Warner Bros. Pictures on October 1, 1938.

== Plot ==
When Rudy Vallee has an accident and cannot meet his engagement at the Garden of the Moon nightclub, Toni Blake, the club's press agent, convinces owner John Quinn to hire young bandleader Don Vincente. Don and his band fly out to California from New York for the engagement, but Don almost quits when he learns he is supposed to perform with a woman singer because, in the past, women singers have caused rifts among the musicians. Don's defiance enrages Quinn, who announces that he will end the engagement as soon as Vallee recovers from his accident. The band, which plays swing music, is very popular with the public. Nonetheless, Quinn forces Don to use the woman singer. Don surrounds her with horns so that she cannot be heard, and Quinn retaliates by turning off Don's microphone. Nonplussed, Don sings without it. Hoping to find him a sponsor, so his trip to California will not be a total waste, Toni convinces a chewing gum manufacturer to listen to Don's broadcast. When Quinn hears about her plans, he determines to destroy the broadcast and the next day fires Don. Knowing that Quinn is fascinated by royalty, Toni plants a story about Don's friendship with the Maharajah of Sund. Soon Don is back at work, where Quinn throws a big party for the Maharajah. Toni's plans have succeeded, but Maurice, the maitre-d', almost ruins them when he recognizes the Maharajah as a bad waiter who once worked for him. Despite Don and Toni's efforts, Quinn learns the truth, but Toni convinces him that he will look like a fool if he takes revenge on Don. Don has been so successful that the owners of the hotel where the Garden is located want to sign him for twenty-six weeks. Don refuses to sign the contract, however, because the gum manufacturer has offered him a radio program. Quinn begs Toni to help him meet his obligations to the owners, and she convinces Don to do the radio broadcast from Hollywood. Mistakenly, he later decides that Toni is in league with Quinn and quits. Desperately, Quinn enlists the help of gossip columnist Jimmie Fidler, who warns Quinn over the radio that gangsters are out to kill him. Quinn fakes a shooting, and on his supposed death bed, he begs Don to stay. His ruse works and soon Quinn is back to work, as ornery as ever, with Don as his bandleader.

== Cast ==
- Pat O'Brien as John Quinn
- Margaret Lindsay as Toni Blake
- John Payne as Don Vincente
- Johnnie Davis as Slappy Harris
- Melville Cooper as Maurice
- Isabel Jeans as Mrs. Lornay
- Mabel Todd as Mary Stanton
- Penny Singleton as Miss Calder
- Dick Purcell as Rick Fulton
- Curt Bois as Maharajah of Sund
- Granville Bates as Angus McGillicuddy
- Edward McWade as Peter McGillicuddy
- Larry Williams as Trent
- Ray Mayer as Musician (piano)
- Jerry Colonna as Musician (trombone)
- Joe Venuti as Musician (violin)
- Jimmy Fidler as Jimmie Fidler

== Production ==
Warners star Bette Davis, having been put on suspension at the start of April 1938 for turning down Comet Over Broadway, remained on suspension when the studio offered her this film, a Busby Berkeley musical. "I was on suspension for a good part of the year following Jezebel. So much wasted time at a time when I felt my career could from then on become a truly successful one...It took a lot of courage to go on suspension. One received no salary...I couldn't afford it, nor could I afford, career-wise, to make films such as Comet over Broadway and Garden of the Moon!"

The same week, Dick Powell was also suspended by Warners for refusing a part in Garden of the Moon. Margaret Lindsay and John Payne replaced them in their respective parts.
