= Deaths in June 1981 =

The following is a list of notable deaths in June 1981.

Entries for each day are listed alphabetically by surname. A typical entry lists information in the following sequence:

- Name, age, country of citizenship at birth, subsequent country of citizenship (if applicable), reason for notability, cause of death (if known), and reference.

== June 1981 ==
=== 1 ===
- Muhammed Abul Manzur, 41, Bangladeshi military officer, he commanded the Bangladesh Forces operations in Sector 8 during the Bangladesh Liberation War against Pakistan in 1971, he was allegedly involved in the assassination of Ziaur Rahman in late May 1981. Following Rahman's death, Muhammed Abul Manzur led a failed coup d'état. Manzur soon lost the support of his own troops. Manzur was reported to have been killed by angry soldiers. Other reports say that he was killed in Chittagong Cantonment by an army officer sent from Dhaka.
- Carl Vinson, 97, American politician, he represented Georgia in the United States House of Representatives from 1914 until 1965, he was repeatedly re-elected by Democratic voters for this seat, Vinson's first term in Congress was characterized by his support for racial segregation, he sponsored bills to establish separate street cars and apartments for Black Americans in the District of Columbia, to ban interracial marriage in the District, and to repeal the Fifteenth Amendment (1870)

=== 2 ===
- Rino Gaetano, 30, Italian singer-songwriter, primarily known for his satirical songs and incisive political commentary, left comatose following a head-on collision of his car with a truck, he died in part because several hospitals refused to admit his as a patient due to a lack of available beds. Years following Gaetano's death, a criminal lawyer publicized a theory that Gaetano's death was a deliberate murder orchestrated by the Italian secret services, and pointed out that Gaetano's friend and political informant Enrico Carnevali died in a similar convenient "accident"

=== 3 ===
- Carleton S. Coon, 76, American anthropologist, cryptozoologist, and professor at the University of Pennsylvania, he was a proponent of the existence of bipedal cryptids, including Sasquatch and Yeti, his 1954 book The Story of Man included a chapter on "Giant Apes and Snowmen" and a figure showing the purported footprints of an "Abominable Snowman" alongside those of extinct hominids, and near the end of his life he wrote a paper on "Why There Has to Be a Sasquatch".Coon believed that cryptid "Wild Men" were relict populations of Pleistocene apes and that, if their existence could be proved scientifically, they would lend support to his theory of the separate origins of human races.

=== 5 ===
- Miguel Contreras Torres, 81, Mexican actor, screenwriter, film producer, and director, he and his wife were the co-owners of the Gutenberg Castle in Balzers from 1951 until 1979.

=== 7 ===
- Ronnie Duke, 49, English musician, dancer and comedian, part of the cabaret duo Dukes and Lee with his wife, heart attack while performing on stage

=== 9 ===
- Russell Hayden, 68, American actor,he portrayed Lucky Jenkins in the film series Hopalong Cassidy
- Allen Ludden, 63, American television personality, actor, singer, emcee, and game show host, he was appointed as the new program coordinator for all CBS owned-and-operated radio stations in June 1959, he hosted both the daytime and prime time versions of the game show Password on CBS and ABC between 1961 and 1975, stomach cancer

=== 10 ===
- Val Imm, 87, American politician and newspaper editor, member of the Minnesota Legislature.
- Jenny Maxwell, 39, American actress, primarily remembered for her role as the flirtatious schoolgirl Ellie Corbett in the Elvis Presley musical film Blue Hawaii (1961), shot and killed in the lobby of her own condo in what was initially reported as a botched robbery. Her estranged husband was also killed in the same incident. According to a 2021 book on her murder, the Los Angeles Police Department (LAPD) concluded that since no property was taken from either of the two victims, the shooting was probably instead a botched hitman attack on Maxwell, orchestrated by her husband over the pending divorce finances. Her husband was a defense attorney with reputed Mafia underworld criminal connections.
- Phelps Phelps, 84, German-born American politician and diplomat, he served as a member of the New York State Assembly (terms 1924–1928, 1937-1938), a member of the New York Senate (term 1939–1942), and the governor of American Samoa (term 1951-1952)

=== 11 ===
- Eppo Doeve, 73, Dutch painter and cartoonist, he drew two newspaper comics, Mannetje Bagatel (1946) and Kleine Isar, de Vierde Koning (1962), both with text by the novelist Bertus Aafjes. Doeve was additionally active in advertising illustration.

=== 12 ===
- Mahmoud Fawzi, 80, Egyptian diplomat and politician,he served as the prime minister of Egypt from 1970 until 1972,and as the Vice President of Egypt from 1972 until 1974
- Evalyn Knapp, 74, American actress, she was selected as one of the WAMPAS Baby Stars in 1932,she achieved success in cliffhanger serials and played the title character in the serial The Perils of Pauline (1933), heart disease

=== 13 ===
- George Walsh, 92, American actor, horse trainer, and horse breeder, George trained his brother Raoul's stable of Thoroughbred racehorses, their horse Sunset Trail competed in the 1937 Kentucky Derby, and finished sixteenth in a field of twenty runners, pneumonia

=== 16 ===
- Hal Block, 67, American comedy writer, comedian, producer, songwriter, and television personality, he started his career as a comedy writer in 1935, when he was hired to write comedy material for the then-new comedy duo of Abbott and Costello, he went on to establish his reputation by writing for many of the top comedians in radio, including Bob Hope, Burns and Allen, Eddie Cantor, Dean Martin, Jerry Lewis and Milton Berle, death due to fire-related injuries, following a fire in his Chicago apartment in late April. He had been hospitalized for months at the time of his death
- Thomas Playford IV, 84, Australian politician, he was a member of the politically prominent Playford family, he served as the Premier of South Australia from 1938 until 1965, he had the longest tenure in office for a state or territory leader in Australian history; remaining in power for almost 27 years,his economic policies favored industrialization and economic growth, when Playford left office in 1965, South Australia's population had doubled from 600,000 in the late 1930s to 1.1 million, the highest proportionate rate among the states; the state'seconomy had done likewise, and personal wealth had increased at the same rate, second only to Victoria, during Playford's 27 years in power, employment in manufacturing in South Australia had increased by 173%; Western Australia was in second place with 155% growth, while the national average was during the period was 129%, heart attack. Playford had received medical treatment for heart disease since his first heart attack in June 1971

=== 17 ===
- Richard O'Connor, 91, Indian-born British general from Kashmir, veteran of both world wars, he led the VIII Corps during its operations in Operation Overlord (1944) and Operation Jupiter (1944)

=== 18 ===
- Richard Goolden, 86, British actor,primarily remembered for his perennial role of Mole in A. A. Milne's play Toad of Toad Hall (1929), which was an adaptation on Kenneth Grahame's children's novel The Wind in the Willows (1908), Goolden first played Mole in 1930. In his later years he was so closely associated with the part that many assumed he had created it. He played the part of the Mole in revivals from the 1930s until the end of the 1970s. Among those with whom he appeared in the play were Wendy Toye, Leslie Henson, Michael Blakemore, Ian Wallace, Michael Bates, and Nicky Henson, the Variety Club of Great Britain gave Goolden a special award in 1976 for his appearances as Mole.
- Pamela Hansford Johnson, 69, English poet, novelist, playwright, literary and social critic.

=== 19 ===
- Anya Phillips, 26, Taiwanese fashion designer and photojournalist, she arrived in Manhattan during the burgeoning downtown punk scene and worked as a photojournalist for the New York Rocker and the Punk magazine, she had a dominatrix act at CBGB with Terence Sellers, not knowing how to sew, she designed dresses by tying together strips of cloth,the singer Debbie Harry wore a dress made by Phillips on the Blondie album Plastic Letters (1978), and her 1983 single "Rush Rush", brain cancer
- Lotte Reiniger, 82, German film director and animator, she was the foremost pioneer of silhouette animation, she learned the art of scherenschnitte, the German art of silhouette, which was in turn inspired by the ancient Chinese art of paper cutting and silhouette puppetry, Reiniger's animated feature film The Adventures of Prince Achmed (1926) was based on One Thousand and One Nights and is believed to be the oldest surviving feature-length animated film, debuting over a decade prior to Walt Disney's Snow White and the Seven Dwarfs (1937)

=== 21 ===
- Don Figlozzi, 72, American animator and cartoonist, he was a veteran of the Fleischer Studios and a member of the National Cartoonists Society, he spent the first half of his career in animation and the second half at the New York Daily News, where his cartoons, signed "Fig," became a fixture. The historian Harvey Deneroff of the Savannah College of Art and Design suggests that Figlozzi may have created the first animations to be used on television.
- Christos Negas, 44-45, Greek actor, heart attack while swimming

=== 22 ===
- Lola Lane, 75, American actress, she was one of the quartet known as the Lane Sisters,most of her films were Warner Bros. productions, such as Four Daughters (1938), Four Wives (1939), and Four Mothers (1941), in each of which she appeared with her sisters Priscilla and Rosemary.The comic book writer Jerry Siegel named his fictional reporter Lois Lane after Lola Lane.

=== 23 ===
- Zarah Leander, 74, Swedish singer and actress, she landed a contract with UFA in Berlin in 1936, the two biggest hits of her recording career were anthems of hope and survival: "Davon geht die Welt nicht unter" ("This is not the end of the world") and "Ich weiss, es wird einmal ein Wunder geschehen" ("I know that someday a miracle will happen", 1942), they are both often included in contemporary documentaries as obvious examples of effective Nazi propaganda,; although no exact record sales numbers exist, she was likely among Europe's best-selling recording artists in the years prior to 1945, she pointed out in later years that what made her a fortune was not her salary from UFA, but the royalties from the records she released,stroke complications
- Suki Potier, 33, English model, as a teenager, she was a model for many English designers and agencies, including English Boy, an agency on the King's Road in Chelsea, London, England, in 1967, she modelled for Ossie Clark's April 1967 collection,she had a romantic relationship with Brian Jones (1942-1969), the Rolling Stones guitarist, living with him in Sussex, England, killed in a car crash while on holiday in Portugal.

=== 26 ===
- Herbert Lytton, 83, American actor, he portrayed Admiral Reynolds in the American sitcom McHale's Navy.
- Don Megowan, 59, American actor, he starred in the science fiction films The Werewolf (1956) in the role of Sheriff Jack Haines, in The Creation of the Humanoids (1962) as a captain in the anti-robot Order of Flesh and Blood, who must stop the Humanoids, and in The Creature Walks Among Us (1956) as the Gill-man, throat cancer

=== 27 ===
- Bansi Chandragupta, 57, Indian art director and production designer, he was a three-time winner of the Filmfare Award for Best Art Direction, heart attack

=== 28 ===
- Mohammad Beheshti, 52, Iranian jurist, poetic philosopher, cleric and politician, he was known as the second person in the political hierarchy of Iran after the Iranian Revolution (1978-1979),he had an important role in writing the constitution of Iran, particularly the economic section, he believed in cooperative companies (Ta'avoni) in the field of economy and partnership and co-operation in lieu of competition in economic affairs, assassinated, he was one of the victims in the Haft-e Tir bombing
- Terry Fox, 22, Canadian athlete, humanitarian, and cancer research activist, after initially receiving medical treatment for osteosarcoma, Fox felt angry at how little money was dedicated to cancer research,; he started planning a Marathon of Hope to raise money for cancer research, he had raised $1.7 million (equivalent to $6 million in 2025) by the time he was forced to abandon the Marathon due to his declining health, death due to chest congestion and pneumonia. He inspired an annual fundraising run known as the Terry Fox Run. The Terry Fox Run remains the world's largest one-day fundraiser for cancer research, and over $850 million has been raised in Fox's name as of May 2022.
- Mohammad Montazeri, 36-37, Iranian cleric and military figure, he headed the People's Revolutionary Organization of the Islamic Republic of Iran, an armed group that was based in Syria and Lebanon and fought against the Israel Defense Forces (IDF), in December 1979, he organized a campaign to support and join the Palestinian militants, fighting in the Lebanese Civil War, assassinated, he was one of the victims in the Haft-e Tir bombing

== Sources ==
- Baynes, John (1989). The Forgotten Victor: General Sir Richard O'Connor, KT, GCB, DSO, MC (1st ed.). Potomac Books. ISBN 0-08-036269-9.
- Cockburn, Stewart (1991). Playford: Benevolent Despot. Axiom Publishing. ISBN 0-9594164-4-7.
- Rino Gaetano: ma il cielo è sempre più blu (unreleased thoughts, stories and songs) by Massimo Cotto, 2004 ISBN 88-04-52794-3
- Crocker, Walter (1983). Sir Thomas Playford: A Portrait. Melbourne University Press. ISBN 0-522-84250-X.
- Gaye, Freda, ed. (1967). Who's Who in the Theatre (fourteenth ed.). London: Sir Isaac Pitman and Sons. OCLC 5997224.
- Liebman, Roy (2000). The Wampas Baby Stars: A Biographical Dictionary, 1922–1934. Jefferson, North Carolina: McFarland. ISBN 0-7864-0756-5.
- Mead, Richard (2007). Churchill's Lions: A biographical guide to the key British generals of World War II. Stroud (UK): Spellmount. pp. 544 pages. ISBN 978-1-86227-431-0.
- Moore, Thurston; Coley, Byron (2008). No Wave: Post-Punk. Underground. New York. 1976-1980. New York: Abrams Image.
- Reynolds, Simon (2009). Totally Wired: Post-Punk Interviews and Overviews. London: Faber and Faber Limited. ISBN 978-0-571-23549-0.
- Rich, David C. (1996). "Tom's vision? Playford and industrialisation". In O'Neil, Bernard; Raftery, Judith; Round, Kerrie (eds.). Playford's South Australia: Essays on the History of South Australia, 1933–1968. Association of Professional Historians. pp. 91–116. ISBN 0-646-29092-4.
- Schönfeld, Christiane. (2006). Practicing modernity : female creativity in the Weimar Republic. Würzburg : Königshausen & Neumann. ISBN 3826032411
- Scrivener, Leslie (September 1, 2000). Terry Fox: His Story. Toronto: McClelland & Stewart. ISBN 978-0-7710-8019-7.
