= Daughters Courageous =

1939 film by Michael Curtiz

- Theatrical release poster
- Directed by: Michael Curtiz
- Screenplay by: Julius J. Epstein; Philip G. Epstein
- Based on: Fly Away Home; 1935 play by Dorothy Bennett; Irving White
- Produced by: Henry Blanke (associate producer); Hal B. Wallis (executive producer)
- Starring: John Garfield; Claude Rains; Jeffrey Lynn; Fay Bainter; Pricilla Lane
- Cinematography: James Wong Howe
- Edited by: Ralph Dawson
- Music by: Max Steiner
- Distributed by: Warner Bros. Pictures
- Release date: June 23, 1939
- Running time: 107 minutes
- Country: United States
- Language: English

Daughters Courageous is a 1939 American drama film starring John Garfield, Claude Rains, Jeffrey Lynn and featuring the Lane Sisters: Lola, Rosemary and Priscilla. Based on the play Fly Away Home by Dorothy Bennett and Irving White, the film was directed by Michael Curtiz. It was released by Warner Bros. Pictures on June 23, 1939.

== Plot ==
Charismatic Jim Masters returns home to Carmel, California, after a globe-roaming 20-year absence to find that his wife, Nancy, is about to marry Sam Sloane, a dull pillar of the local community. The four Masters daughters are also upset that their irresponsible father has re-entered their lives after so long away. Meanwhile, the youngest, Buff, has grown cold on her playwright boyfriend and is drawn to malcontent Gabriel Lopez, whose irrepressible wanderlust reminds Jim Masters of himself.

Both women must choose between passion and stability.

== Cast ==
- John Garfield as Gabriel Lopez
- Claude Rains as Jim Masters
- Jeffrey Lynn as Johnny Heming
- Fay Bainter as Nancy Masters
- Donald Crisp as Sam Sloane
- May Robson as Penny
- Frank McHugh as George
- Dick Foran as Eddie Moore
- Priscilla Lane as Buff Masters
- Rosemary Lane as Tinka Masters
- Lola Lane as Linda Masters
- Gale Page as Cora Masters
- George Humbert as Manuel Lopez
- Berton Churchill as Judge Henry Hornsby

== Production ==
Daughters Courageous was made as a stand-alone film, and its characters do not appear in any other film. However, it has much in common with the "Four Daughters" film series of that era, with the same director, largely the same cast (including the Lane sisters) and many similarities in subject matter. The series consists of 1938's Four Daughters, the 1939 film Four Wives, and 1941's Four Mothers.

== Reception ==
Frank S. Nugent of The New York Times called the film "a thoroughly pleasant entertainment—albeit reminiscent—with a thoroughly pleasant cast to grace it." Variety wrote: "Few of the situations can stand up under too close scrutiny, but the flavor of the film as a whole is entertaining, amusing, and occasionally emotional." Harrison's Reports called it "Good entertainment ... Although it is not as impressive as 'Four Daughters,' it nevertheless holds one's attention well, since one is in sympathy with all the characters." Film Daily called it "A production with a high voltage of sentimental of romantic appeal" with a "super-duper" cast. John Mosher of The New Yorker wrote that Garfield added "a touch of color or adventuresome liveliness" to help along the story, but found "a quantity of bungalow patter that wears one down at times" and "a slight dullness" to the picture.

== Home media ==
Warner Archive released the film on DVD on August 1, 2011. The film was also released by Warner Archive in the "Four Daughters Movie Series Collection".
