= Rosemary Lane (actress) =

American actress (1913–1974)

- Lane in 1939
- Born: Rosemary Mullican; April 4, 1913; Indianola, Iowa, U.S.
- Died: November 25, 1974 (aged 61); Los Angeles, California, U.S.
- Resting place: Forest Lawn Memorial Park, Glendale, California
- Occupation: Actress
- Years active: 1937–1945
- Spouse: Bud Westmore (m. 1941; div. 1954)
- Children: 1

Rosemary Lane (born Rosemary Mullican; April 4, 1913 – November 25, 1974) was an American actress and singer. She is known for her performances with Lola and Priscilla as the Lane Sisters and Fred Waring's Pennsylvanians in the 1930s, and for her film career in the 1930s to 1940s.

== Early years ==
Rosemary was born in Indianola, Iowa, in 1913, to dentist Lorenzo Mullican and his wife, Cora Bell Hicks. She had four sisters (Leotabel (Leota), Dorothy (Lola), Martha and Priscilla, three of whom later had careers in entertainment. As children, Rosemary and her sister Priscilla traveled to Des Moines every weekend to study dancing with Rose Lorenz, a renowned dance teacher. The girls made their first professional appearance on September 30, 1930, at Des Moines' Paramount Theater. In 1930, Rosemary performed on stage as part of the entertainment accompanying the release of her sister Lola's Hollywood movie Good News. Rosemary, a member of the National Honor Society, graduated from Indianola High in 1931 and attended Simpson College for a while, playing on the freshman basketball team.

In 1932 Rosemary moved with her mother to New York, where her older sisters Leota and Lola had already made their debuts on Broadway. Fred Waring, an orchestra leader, heard Rosemary and Priscilla singing, and contracted the Lane sisters to join his band, The Pennsylvanians.

== Film career ==
Rosemary and Priscilla remained with Fred Waring for almost five years. In 1937, Waring was engaged by Warner Bros. in Hollywood to appear with his entire band in Varsity Show, a musical starring Dick Powell. Both Rosemary and Priscilla took feature roles in the film. Lane's next film was the musical Hollywood Hotel, in which she co-starred with sister Lola, and Powell, before starring in Gold Diggers in Paris, opposite Rudy Vallee.

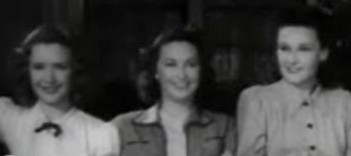
Priscilla, Rosemary and Lola in Four Wives (1939)

Priscilla, Rosemary, and Lola appeared as three of four sisters (the fourth being Gale Page) in Four Daughters in 1938; in the similarly themed Daughters Courageous in 1939, and in two sequels, Four Wives in 1939 and Four Mothers in 1941. She also starred in The Oklahoma Kid in 1939, playing a 'real girl of the West' who falls in love with James Cagney, while Humphrey Bogart plays the 'real villain'.

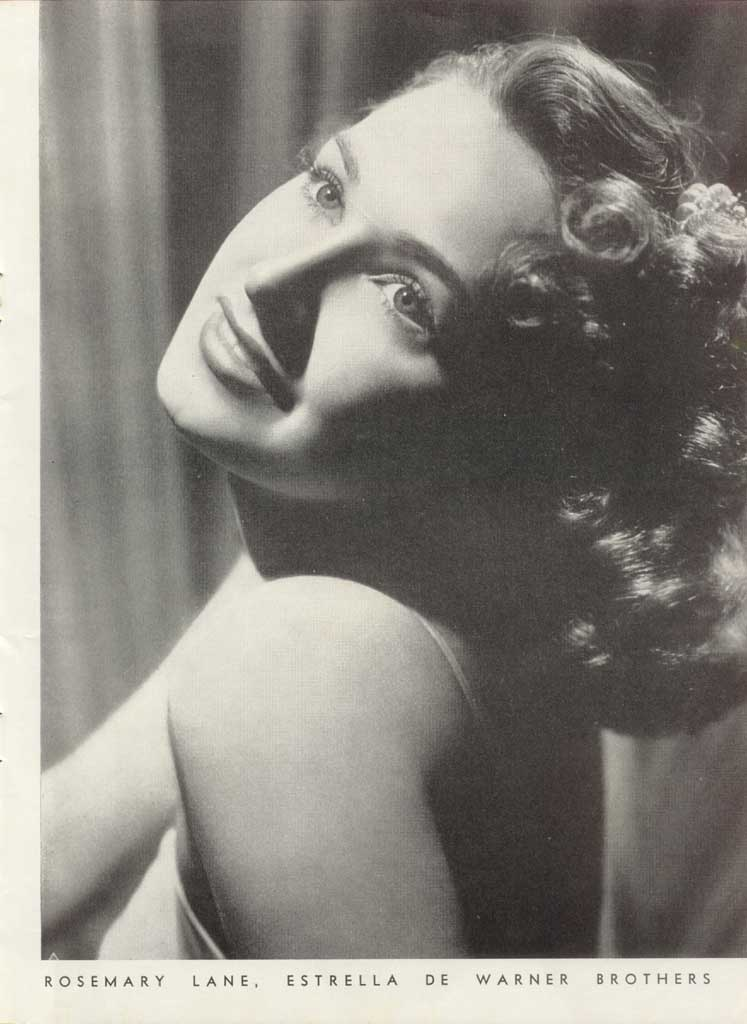
Rosemary Lane in August 1940

Lane earned good reviews for The Boys from Syracuse in 1940, based on Rodgers and Hart's Broadway hit of 1938. The next year she made an unusual move for a film actress of her era by becoming a Broadway star in the musical Best Foot Forward, as Gale Joy, which opened on Broadway at the Ethel Barrymore Theatre on October 1, 1941. It closed after 326 performances on the Fourth of July 1942. Lane closed out her film career in 1945 with Sing Me a Song of Texas, as nightclub singer Laurie Lang, the niece of a wealthy Texas rancher. She began a career selling real estate from an office in Pacific Palisades.

In 1942, a street in Burbank, California, was named Rosemary Lane in her honor.

== Personal life ==
Lane married Hollywood makeup artist George H. "Bud" Westmore on December 28, 1941. They were married for 13 years and had a daughter, Bridget Westmore. The couple divorced in 1954. Like her sisters Lola and Priscilla, Lane was a Roman Catholic convert.

== Death ==
Lane died of diabetes and pulmonary obstruction at Motion Picture Country Hospital on November 25, 1974, in Woodland Hills, California at the age of 61. She was buried in an unmarked grave at Forest Lawn Memorial Park in Glendale, California with a grave marker finally placed in 2012.

== Filmography ==
Year	Film	Role	Notes
1937	Varsity Show	Barbara 'Babs' Steward	
1937	Hollywood Hotel	Virginia Stanton	
1938	Gold Diggers in Paris	Kay Morrow	
1938	Four Daughters	Kay Lemp	
1939	Blackwell's Island	Mary 'Sunny' Walsh	
1939	The Oklahoma Kid	Jane Hardwick	
1939	Daughters Courageous	Tinka Masters	
1939	The Return of Doctor X	Joan Vance	
1939	Four Wives	Kay Lemp	
1940	An Angel from Texas	Lydia Weston	
1940	Ladies Must Live	Pat Halliday	
1940	The Boys from Syracuse	Phyllis	
1940	Always a Bride	Alice Bond	
1941	Four Mothers	Kay Lemp Forrest	
1941	Time Out for Rhythm	Frances Lewis	
1943	Chatterbox	Carol Forrest	
1943	All by Myself	Val Stevenson	
1943	Harvest Melody	Gilda Parker	
1944	Trocadero	Judy	
1945	Sing Me a Song of Texas	Laurie Lang	
