= Harvest Melody =

1943 film directed by Sam Newfield

- Directed by: Sam Newfield
- Screenplay by: Allan Gale
- Story by: Martin Mooney; Ande Lamb
- Produced by: Walter Colmes
- Starring: Rosemary Lane; Johnny Downs; Charlotte Wynters; Sheldon Leonard; Luis Alberni; Claire Rochelle; Syd Saylor; Marjorie Manners; Henry Hall; Billy Nelson; Frances Gladwin; Marin Sais; Herbert Heyes
- Cinematography: James S. Brown Jr.
- Edited by: Holbrook N. Todd
- Production company: Walter Colmes Productions
- Distributed by: Producers Releasing Corporation
- Release date: November 22, 1943
- Running time: 70 minutes
- Country: United States
- Language: English

Harvest Melody is a 1943 American musical film directed by Sam Newfield and written by Allan Gale. The film stars Rosemary Lane, Johnny Downs, Charlotte Wynters, Sheldon Leonard, Luis Alberni, Claire Rochelle, Syd Saylor, Marjorie Manners, Henry Hall, Billy Nelson, Frances Gladwin, Marin Sais and Herbert Heyes. The film was released on November 22, 1943, by Producers Releasing Corporation.

== Plot ==
Tommy and Jane come to the Club Pronto from their farm and meet a Hollywood press agent. After Tommy and Jane explain their current hardships to Chuck (the press agent); and Chuck offers his and his client's help in harvesting the crops from farm.

== Cast ==
- Rosemary Lane as Gilda Parker
- Johnny Downs as Tommy Nelson
- Charlotte Wynters as Nancy
- Sheldon Leonard as Chuck
- Luis Alberni as Cafe Manager
- Claire Rochelle as Daisy
- Syd Saylor as Spot Potter
- Marjorie Manners as Jane
- Henry Hall as Pa Nelson
- Billy Nelson as Canvas Back Kirby
- Frances Gladwin as Cigarette Girl
- Marin Sais as Ma Nelson
- Herbert Heyes as Joe Burton
- Eddie Le Baron as Eddie Le Baron
- Eddie Bartell as Radio Rogue Member
- Sydney Chatton as Radio Rogue Member
- Jimmy Hollywood as Radio Rogue Member
- Sunny Fox as Sunny Fox
