= Naughty but Nice (1939 film) =

1939 film by Ray Enright

- Theatrical release poster
- Directed by: Ray Enright
- Screenplay by: Richard Macaulay; Jerry Wald
- Based on: "Always Leave Them Laughing" (story) by Richard Macaulay; Jerry Wald
- Produced by: Samuel Bischoff (uncredited)
- Starring: Dick Powell; Ann Sheridan
- Cinematography: Arthur L. Todd
- Edited by: Thomas Richards
- Music by: Songs: Harry Warren (music); Johnny Mercer (lyrics)
- Production company: Warner Bros. Pictures
- Distributed by: Warner Bros. Pictures
- Release date: June 1, 1939
- Running time: 89 minutes
- Country: United States
- Language: English

Naughty but Nice is a 1939 Warner Bros. musical comedy film directed by Ray Enright and starring Dick Powell, Ann Sheridan, Gale Page, Ronald Reagan and Helen Broderick. The original story and screenplay were written by Richard Macaulay and Jerry Wald, and the film includes songs with music by Harry Warren and lyrics by Johnny Mercer, as well as music adapted from Bach, Beethoven, Liszt, Mozart, Schumann and Wagner. Sheridan's original voice is heard in most of her songs, but for the song "In a Moment of Weakness", her voice was dubbed by Vera Van.

== Plot ==
Professor Donald Hardwick, who lectures his students against swing music and jitterbugging, travels to New York City hoping to have his symphony published. He accidentally writes a hit swing song ("Hooray for Spinach, Hooray for Milk") with the assistance of aspiring lyricist Linda McKay. As a result, Hardwick finds disfavor with the dean of his college. After the teetotaling Hardwick accidentally becomes drunk, he promises to remain in New York City for the summer and write songs with McKay. They write three more hit songs.

Singer Zelda Manion exploits Hardwick's talents to her own advantage by inebriating Hardwick and tricking him into signing a contract with her publisher. His new lyricist Joe Dirk lands Hardwick in trouble by copying a classical piece of music and signing Hardwick's name to it. At Hardwick's trial, his aunts convince the judge, a songwriter himself, that the earlier song was copied from a work in the public domain, and the judge dismisses the case.

== Cast ==
- Ann Sheridan as Zelda Manion
- Dick Powell as Professor Donald Hardwick
- Gale Page as Linda McKay
- Helen Broderick as Aunt Martha Hogan
- Ronald Reagan as Eddie Clark
- Allen Jenkins as Joe Dirk
- ZaSu Pitts as Aunt Penelope Hardwick
- Maxie Rosenbloom as Killer
- Jerry Colonna as Allie Gray
- Luis Alberni as Stanislaus Pysinski
- Vera Lewis as Aunt Annabella Hardwick
- Elizabeth Dunne as Aunt Henrietta Hardwick
- William B. Davidson as Samuel "Simsy" Hudson, music publisher
- Granville Bates as Judge Kennith B. Walters, Superior Court
- Halliwell Hobbes as Dean Burton, Winfield College

== Production ==
Naughty but Nice had the working titles of Professor Steps Out and Always Leave Them Laughing.

After seven years and 37 films, the film's star Dick Powell was upset with his continuous typecasting while at Warner Bros. and refused to sign a new contract when his existing contract expired, so Naughty but Nice was his last film for the studio. Although Warner Bros. initially withheld the film, it was released one year later after Ann Sheridan received a great deal of publicity after being voted Hollywood's top "oomph" girl by a panel of 25 men. Warner Bros. then rushed the release of Naughty but Nice, pushing Sheridan's billing over that of Powell.
