= SS Vaterland =

SS Vaterland may refer to one of the following Hamburg America Line ships:

- SS Vaterland (1913), a 54,282 GRT ocean liner; seized by the United States in World War I and renamed Leviathan
- SS Vaterland (1940), an incomplete ship destroyed by Allied bombers in 1943

== See also ==
SS Vaderland
