= Heart of the North =

1938 film by Lewis Seiler

- Theatrical release poster
- Directed by: Lewis Seiler
- Screenplay by: Lee Katz; Vincent Sherman
- Based on: Heart of the North; 1930 novel by William Byron Mowery
- Produced by: Bryan Foy
- Starring: Dick Foran; Gloria Dickson; Gale Page; Allen Jenkins; Patric Knowles; Janet Chapman
- Cinematography: Wilfred M. Cline; L. William O'Connell
- Edited by: Louis Hesse
- Music by: Adolph Deutsch
- Color process: Technicolor
- Production company: Warner Bros. Pictures
- Distributed by: Warner Bros. Pictures
- Release date: December 10, 1938
- Running time: 83 minutes
- Country: United States
- Language: English

Heart of the North is a 1938 American adventure film directed by Lewis Seiler and written by Lee Katz and Vincent Sherman. The film stars Dick Foran, Gloria Dickson, Gale Page, Allen Jenkins, Patric Knowles, and Janet Chapman. The film was released by Warner Bros. Pictures on December 10, 1938. It is based on the novel with the same name, written by William Byron Mowery. It was Warner Brothers' fourth three-strip Technicolor feature-length film.

== Plot ==
The Canadian Mounties abandon horses to pursue a gang of gold and fur thieves, using boats, canoes, and airplanes. The film's story begins when Cpl. Jim Montgomery of the R.C.M.P. (Patric Knowles) takes his little daughter Julie (Janet Chapman) from Fort Endurance in the Northwest Territories to school in Edmonton on the river steamer Arctic Queen. But midway through the voyage, six men hold up the boat, killing Montgomery in front of his daughter. Then, they disable the steamer and steal its cargo of furs and gold, escaping by canoe.

R.C.M.P. Inspector Stephen Gore (James Stephenson), commanding Fort Endurance, sends Sgt. Alan Baker (Dick Foran) and five other Mounties after the bandits in a motor launch and canoe. However, Gore also orders Baker to split his unit in two when they reach a certain point of their trek. This leaves Baker short of manpower. So when he and his two mates are ambushed by the bandits, he is forced to end the pursuit and bring a wounded comrade back to the fort. There, he is confined to quarters for failing to arrest trapper Dave McMillan (Russell Simpson) when some of the gang's stolen furs are found in his shed.

Later, Baker and Cpl. Bill Hardsock (Allen Jenkins) steal a forestry department float plane to search the lakes and rivers. They find the bandits and strafe their canoes, leaving two bandits to be pursued on land. Baker captures the bandit leader, who admits they are working for the corrupt shipping agent Red Crocker (Joe Sawyer). A pursuing forestry plane lands and takes Baker, Hardsock, and the bandit leader back to Fort Endurance. They arrive just in time to save McMillan from being lynched by a group of angry gold miners. As a result, Baker is promoted inspector and given command of the fort.

== Cast ==
- Dick Foran as Sergeant Alan Baker
- Gloria Dickson as Joyce MacMillan
- Gale Page as Elizabeth Spaulding
- Allen Jenkins as Corporal Bill Hardsock
- Patric Knowles as Corporal Jim Montgomery
- Janet Chapman as Judy Montgomery
- James Stephenson as Inspector Stephen Gore
- Anthony Averill as Constable Whipple
- Joe Sawyer as Red Crocker
- Joe King as Mac Drummond
- Russell Simpson as Dave MacMillan
- Arthur Gardner as Constable Larry Young
- Garry Owen as Tom 'Tommy' Ryan
- Pedro de Cordoba as Father Claverly
- Alec Harford as Lunnon Dick
- Robert Homans as Boat Captain Ashman
- Anderson Lawler as Constable Burgoon
- Bruce Carruthers as Constable Pedeault
