= Hollywood Hotel (film) =

1937 film

- Theatrical release poster
- Directed by: Busby Berkeley
- Screenplay by: Jerry Wald; Maurice Leo; Richard Macaulay
- Story by: Jerry Wald; Maurice Leo
- Produced by: Uncredited: Samuel Bischoff; Bryan Foy
- Starring: Dick Powell; Rosemary Lane; Lola Lane; Hugh Herbert; Ted Healy; Glenda Farrell; Johnnie Davis
- Cinematography: Charles Rosher; George Barnes (musical numbers)
- Edited by: George Amy
- Music by: Songs: Johnny Mercer; Richard A. Whiting; Score (uncredited): Ray Heindorf; Heinz Roemheld
- Production company: First National Pictures
- Distributed by: Warner Bros. Pictures
- Release date: December 20, 1937 (U.S.)
- Running time: 109 minutes
- Country: United States
- Language: English
- Budget: over $1 million

Hollywood Hotel is a 1937 American romantic musical comedy film, directed by Busby Berkeley, starring Dick Powell, Rosemary Lane, Lola Lane, Hugh Herbert, Ted Healy, Glenda Farrell and Johnnie Davis, featuring Alan Mowbray and Mabel Todd, and with Allyn Joslyn, Grant Mitchell and Edgar Kennedy.

The film was based on the popular Hollywood Hotel radio show created by gossip columnist Louella Parsons, where Hollywood stars recreated scenes from their latest movies. It was broadcast weekly from the hotel of that name. The film's recreation of the program features Louella Parsons, Frances Langford, Raymond Paige and His Orchestra, Jerry Cooper, the announcer Ken Niles, Duane Thompson and Benny Goodman and His Orchestra.

Hollywood Hotel, the film, is now best remembered for the featured song and opening number "Hooray for Hollywood" by Johnny Mercer and Richard A. Whiting, sung in the film by Davis and Langford, accompanied by Goodman and his orchestra. The song has become a standard part of the soundtrack to movie award ceremonies, including the Academy Awards. Mercer's lyrics contain numerous references, often satirical, to the movie industry and the path to film stardom.

== Plot ==
Saxophone player and singer Ronnie Bowers is on his way to Hollywood, having been signed to a ten-week contract by All Star Pictures. At the airport, his former employer, Benny Goodman, and his band give him a big sendoff, performing "Hooray for Hollywood".

In Hollywood, temperamental star Mona Marshall becomes furious when she learns that another actress has landed a part she desperately wanted. As a result, she refuses to attend the premiere of her latest movie.

Publicist Bernie Walton convinces studio boss B. L. Faulkin to substitute a double. Bernie chooses Virginia Stanton, who has already worked as a stand-in for Mona. For her escort, Bernie chooses an unsuspecting (and starstruck) Ronnie. The charade works. Everyone, from Ronnie to Louella Parsons to the radio host at the premiere is fooled. Things take an unexpected turn when Ronnie and Virginia begin to fall in love, wading in a fountain pond and singing "I'm Like a Fish Out of Water".

The next day, Bernie takes Ronnie to lunch at the restaurant where Virginia is working as a waitress, to break the news of his date's real identity. Ronnie and Virginia begin dating.

When Mona reads in the newspaper that "she" was at the premiere with Ronnie, she forces Faulkin to buy the young man out of his contract. Photographer Fuzzy Boyle appoints himself Ronnie's agent, and they make the rounds, trying to get his acting career started, without success. The two end up employed at a drive-in. When Ronnie sings during work, director Walter Kelton is impressed and offers him a job. Ronnie is disappointed to learn, however, that he will not be acting, but only dubbing the singing for Mona's longtime screen partner, Alex Dupre.

Dupre's "singing" impresses the audience at the preview. When Louella Parsons invites him to perform on her radio program, he accepts without thinking. Desperate, All Star Pictures pays Ronnie an exorbitant fee to sing for the actor. However, Ronnie has his own ideas. Virginia (posing as Mona) picks up Dupre in a limousine driven by Fuzzy. The pair drive him out into the countryside so he misses the program. Ronnie substitutes for Dupre and is a hit, so Faulkin decides to re-sign him, at a larger salary.

== Cast ==
- Dick Powell as Ronnie Bowers
- Rosemary Lane as Virginia Stanton
- Lola Lane as Mona Marshall
- Hugh Herbert as Chester Marshall, Mona's father
- Ted Healy as Fuzzy Boyle
- Glenda Farrell as Jonesy, Mona's assistant
- Johnnie Davis as Georgia
- Louella Parsons as herself
- Alan Mowbray as Alexander Dupre
- Mabel Todd as Dot Marshall, Mona's sister
- Frances Langford as Alice Crayne
- Jerry Cooper as himself
- Ken Niles as himself
- Duane Thompson as herself
- Allyn Joslyn as Bernie Walton
- Grant Mitchell as B. L. Faulkin
- Edgar Kennedy as Callaghan, the drive-in owner
- Fritz Feld as the Russian, a restaurant patron
- Curt Bois as Butch, the dress designer
- Perc Westmore as himself
- Eddie Acuff as Joe, the cameraman
- Clinton Rosemond as Tom, African-American singer
- William Davidson as Director Walter Kelton
- Wally Maher as Assistant Director Drew
- Georgie Cooper as seamstress
- Libby Taylor as Cleo, Mona's maid
- Joe Romantini as Waiter
- Paul Irving as Bramwell
- Raymond Paige and his Orchestra as themselves
- Benny Goodman and His Orchestra as themselves

Cast notes:

- Louella Parsons, a noted gossip columnist of the time, created the concept of Hollywood Hotel for the radio, and appears in the film as herself. It was her screen debut.
- The Benny Goodman Orchestra at this time included drummer Gene Krupa, Harry James on trumpet, pianist Teddy Wilson and vibraphonist Lionel Hampton. The strong reaction of the band's fans to its appearance in the film helped to convince Goodman to do the Carnegie Hall concert that had been suggested by his publicist, Wynn Nathanson. Goodman had been concerned that it would be perceived as a publicity stunt.
- Ted Healy is perhaps best known for creating the vaudeville act which later evolved into The Three Stooges. Hollywood Hotel was released in January 1938, less than a month after Healy's death, the cause of which is still a matter of debate today.
- Lola Lane, who plays Mona Marshall, and Rosemary Lane, who plays Marshall's stand-in, were sisters. Another sister, Priscilla Lane, was an even more successful film actress.
- Ronald Reagan makes his second film appearance in Hollywood Hotel, uncredited, as the radio host at a film premiere.
- Both Carole Landis, as a hatcheck girl, and Susan Hayward, as a starlet, appear in the film uncredited. It was Hayward's film debut.

== Production ==
Warner Bros. originally wanted Bette Davis to play both Mona Marshall and her stand-in, but Davis managed to convince them that it was not a good idea.

The studio was sued by both the Campbell's, who sponsored the Hollywood Hotel radio program, and by the hotel itself, for using the name without authorization. The Hollywood Hotel at its peak had attracted the royalty of Hollywood, such as Mary Pickford and Douglas Fairbanks, but it had fallen in prominence by the time this film was made. Some exteriors of the hotel appear in the film. The hotel no longer exists, in its place is the Dolby Theatre, from where the Academy Awards presentations have originated since 2001.

== Reception ==
"Hooray for Hollywood" was nominated for the American Film Institute's 2004 list AFI's 100 Years...100 Songs, while the movie was nominated for the 2006 list AFI's Greatest Movie Musicals.

== See also ==
- Hollywood Hotel (radio program)

== Bibliography ==
- Green, Stanley (1999) Hollywood Musicals Year by Year (2nd ed.), pub. Hal Leonard Corporation ISBN 0-634-00765-3 page 78
