= Follow the Band =

1943 film by Jean Yarbrough

- Directed by: Jean Yarbrough
- Written by: Harry Wilson; Dorothy Bennett
- Based on: story in Collier's magazine by Richard English
- Starring: Eddie Quillan; Mary Beth Hughes; Leon Errol
- Cinematography: Elwood Bredell
- Edited by: Milton Carruth
- Production company: Universal Pictures
- Distributed by: Universal Pictures
- Release date: 1943
- Running time: 61 minutes
- Country: United States
- Language: English

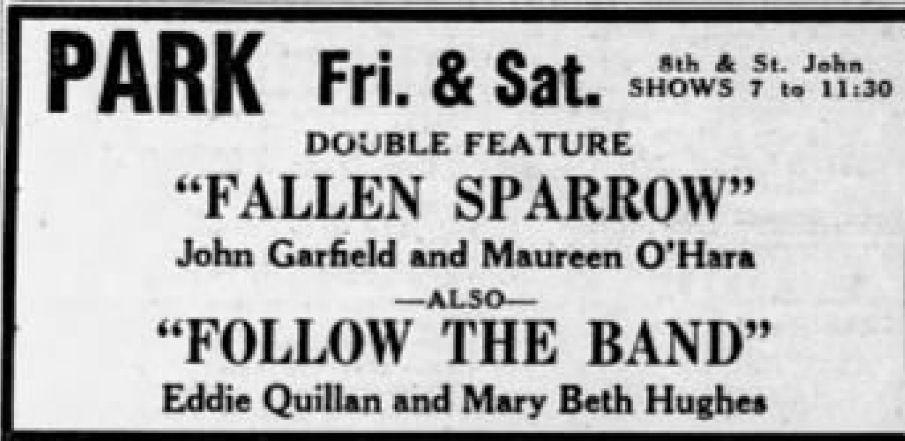
Newspaper advertisement listing the film

Follow the Band is a 1943 black-and-white musical film directed by Jean Yarbrough, one of many Universal churned out during World War II. It stars Eddie Quillan, Mary Beth Hughes, and Leon Errol, and is noteworthy as an early credit for Robert Mitchum.

== Plot ==
Marvin Howe is hired to work on the floor of the Clover Leaf Dairy Farm in Rutledge, Vermont, but much to his employer's dismay, he spends most of his working hours practicing playing the trombone, and not doing what he is supposed to. His boss, "Pop" Turnbull - the owner of the dairy, doesn't know that he is involved with Pop's daughter, Juanita, and is negatively surprised when the couple announces their engagement one day. Another man who works at the farm, Tate Winters, is also romantically interested in Juanita, and when he finds out about the engagement he convinces Pop that Marvin should be sent away on business. So Pop make Marvin go to New York City in order to obtain a membership National Dairymen's Association for him. Tate is well aware of that Pop repeatedly has been refused such a membership in the past, mainly because Pop raises goats and not cows. This makes the task nearly impossible for Marvin to perform.

When Marvin arrives in New York he doesn't get to see the president of the Dairymen's Association, Jeremiah K. Barton. The president has told his secretary, Lucille Rose, to fend Marvin off and tell him that Jeremiah will be busy with a conference for a whole week. But the plan backfires. Instead of going home again, Marvin checks in at a boardinghouse for the week and stays in the city. The boardinghouse is owned by a Mrs. Forbes. While Marvin waits for an audience with Jeremiah, he takes time to play his trombone, which he brought with him.

Mrs. Forbes son Skinnay hears Marvin play the trombone and likes what he hears. He offers Marvin to become a member of his jazz band. He accepts the offer, and furthermore, Skinnay's friend, the intriguing Dolly O'Brien, convinces Marvin to play with the band at a nightclub owned by her uncle, Big Mike O'Brien - the Rendezvous. During the show at night, Marvin accidentally becomes a local hero when he pops out gang leader Alphonse as he is trying to destroy the nightclub after being fired by Big Mike. Marvin gets the nickname "The Hot Toot".

In the wake of these events, Pop decides to bring Juanita to the Big Apple, in order to demonstrate how the big city has changed the man she is planning to marry - all in an attempt to steer her clear of the marriage and choose Tate instead. Juanita is led to believe that Dolly is Marvin's new girl friend, and she breaks off their engagement, thus playing right into her father's and Tate's hands. She goes back to Rutledge, heart broken.

Meanwhile, Marvin is offered a national radio show contract to play with Skinnay's jazz band. But Marvin is heart broken too, and instead of jumping at the opportunity he quits the band entirely and goes home to Rutledge to win Juanita back. He arrives just as Juanita is about to marry Tate. The band members of Skinnay's and Dolly follow Marvin back to Rutledge to help out. Dolly gets a chance to talk alone to Juanita, and she reveals the truth to her. After this Marvin and Juanita are reunited, just in time for the band to be able to perform on the radio for the first time.

== Cast ==
- Eddie Quillan as Marvin Howe
- Anne Rooney as Juanita Turnbull
- Russell Hicks as Jeremiah K. Barton
- Samuel S. Hinds as "Pop" Turnbull
- Mary Beth Hughes as Dolly O'Brien
- Leon Errol as Big Mike O'Brien
- Robert Mitchum as Tate Winters
