= Always a Bride (1940 film) =

1940 film by Noel M. Smith

- Directed by: Noel M. Smith
- Screenplay by: Robert E. Kent
- Based on: Applesauce, 1925 play by Barry Conners
- Produced by: Jack L. Warner; Bryan Foy
- Starring: Rosemary Lane; George Reeves; John Eldredge
- Cinematography: Charles Schoenbaum
- Edited by: Frank Magee
- Music by: Rex Dunn
- Production company: Warner Bros. Pictures
- Distributed by: Warner Bros. Pictures
- Release date: November 2, 1940
- Running time: 58 minutes
- Country: United States
- Language: English

Always a Bride is a 1940 American comedy film directed by Noel M. Smith and starring Rosemary Lane, George Reeves and John Eldredge. It was produced and distributed by Warner Bros. Pictures as a second feature.

== Plot ==
Wealthy Alice Bond, dissatisfied with her dull fiancé Marshall Winkler, discards him in favor of Michael Stevens. To make certain that her new beau will be acceptable to her parents, Alice contrives to have Michael enter a mayoral campaign. As election day draws close, criminals complicate matters.

== Cast ==
- Rosemary Lane as Alice Bond
- George Reeves as Michael 'Mike' Stevens
- John Eldredge as Marshall Winkler
- James Hayter as Dutton
- Virginia Brissac as Lucy Bond
- Francis Pierlot as Pete Bond
- Oscar O'Shea as Uncle Dan Jarvis
- Ferris Taylor as Mayor Paul Loomis
- Joe King as Mr. Franklyn (as Joseph King)
- Phyllis Ruth as Mary Ann Coleridge
- Lucia Carroll as Mayor's Receptionist
- Jack Mower as Martin, First Man Yelling Out at Meeting
- Tom Wilson as Charlie, Dance Party Guest

== Reception ==
In a contemporary review for The New York Times, critic A. H. Weiler called the film "a story which barely has an affinity for its title" and wrote: "Flattery being specious at best and subject to change at a moment's notice, the Warner's dissertation on the subject in 'Always a Bride' ... falls short of its expected effect. Put the film down as comedy, but also as an oft-told tale which tends toward the dreary side."
