= May Robson =

Australian-American actress (1858–1942)

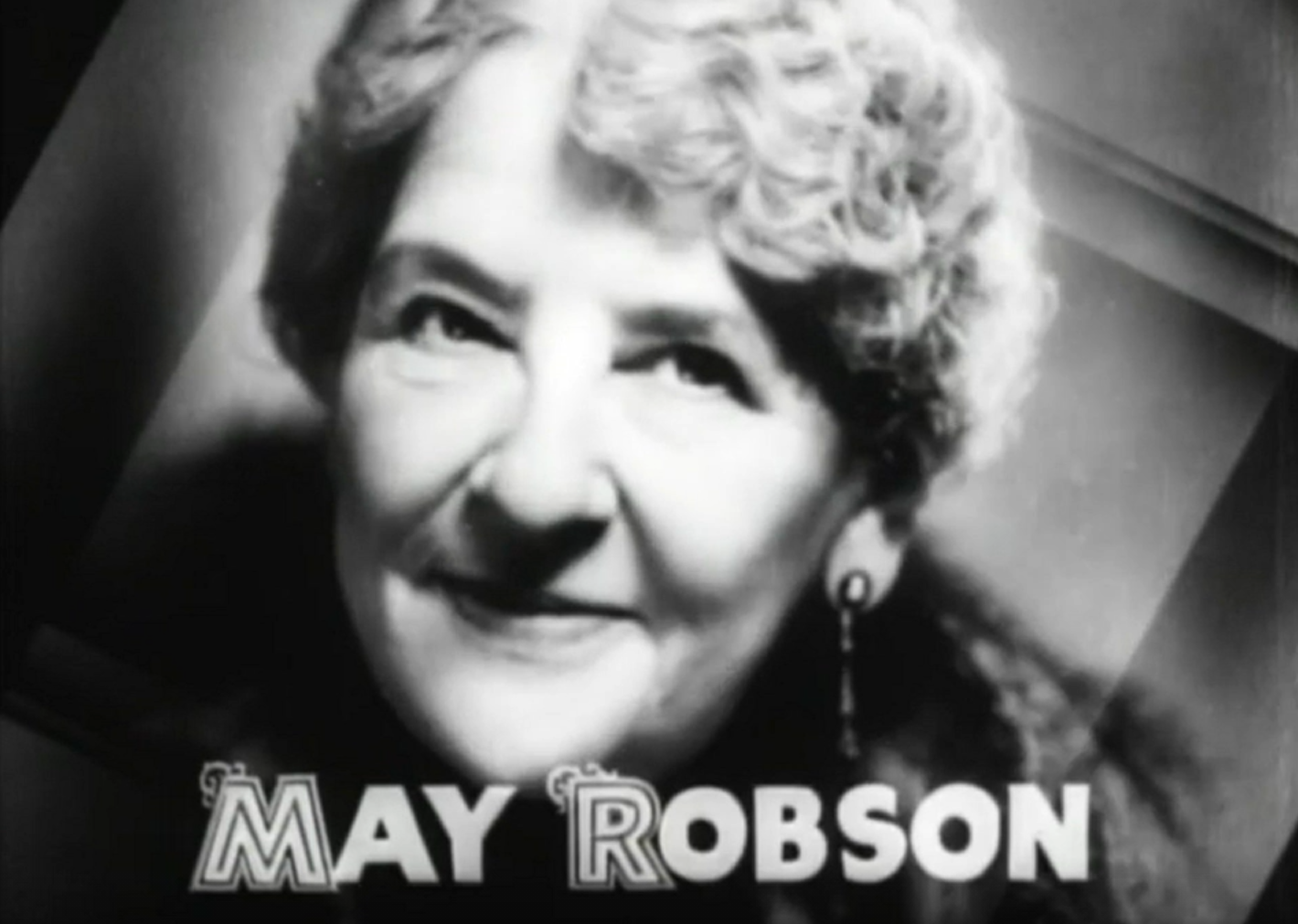
- Trailer for Broadway to Hollywood (1933)
- Born: Mary Jeanette Robison; 19 April 1858; Moama, New South Wales, Australia
- Died: 20 October 1942 (aged 84); Beverly Hills, California, U.S.
- Resting place: Flushing Cemetery, Queens, New York City
- Occupation: Actress
- Years active: 1883–1942
- Spouses: Charles L. Gore (m. 1875; died 1883) Augustus H. Brown (m. 1889; died 1920)
- Children: 3

Mary Jeanette Robison (19 April 1858 – 20 October 1942), known professionally as May Robson, was an Australian-born America-based actress whose career spanned 58 years, starting in 1883 when she was 25. A major stage actress of the late 19th and early 20th centuries, she is remembered for the dozens of films she appeared in during the 1930s, when she was in her 70s.

Robson was the earliest-born person, and the first Australian to be nominated for an Academy Award (for her leading role in Lady for a Day in 1933).

== Early life ==
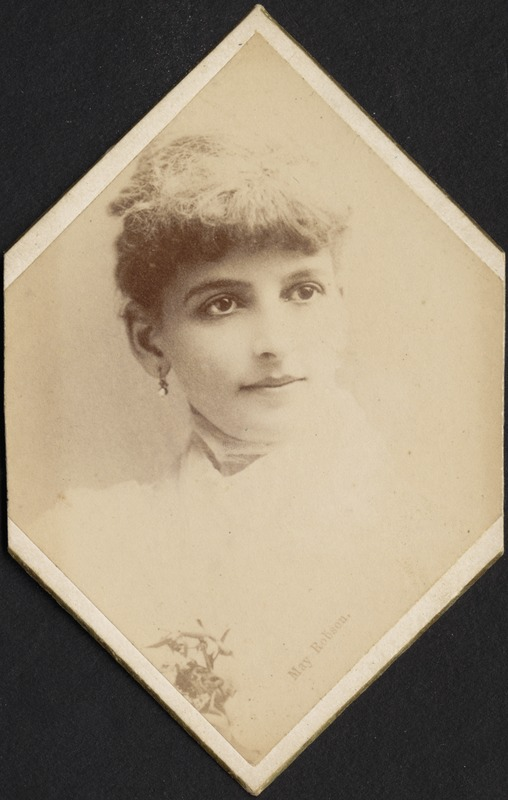
May Robson carte de visite

Mary Jeanette Robison was born 19 April 1858 in Moama, (Note: The obituary for Robson in the Berkshire Evening Eagle and Billboard Magazine, as well as the summary of her life at the Library of Congress, stated that she was born in Melbourne, Victoria, but the family was living in Moama, New South Wales at the time of her birth.) in the Colony of New South Wales, (Note: At the time, New South Wales (NSW) was a self-governing colony of Britain; Australia did not officially exist until the federation of six separate British colonies, in 1901.) in what she described as "the Australian bush". She was the fourth child of Julia, née Schlesinger (or Schelesinger) and Henry Robison; her siblings were Williams, James, and Adelaide.

Henry Robison was born in Penrith, Cumberland, England and lived in Liverpool. He served 24 years in the foreign trade of the British Merchant Navy as a mate and a sea captain. He retired at half-pay due to his poor health and travelled with Julia Robison to Melbourne, Victoria, Australia in 1853 on the SS Great Britain. By April 1855, he was a watchmaker, jeweller, silversmith and ornamental hairworker in Melbourne. According to Robson, her parents both suffered from phthisis pulmonalis, and moved to "the bush" for their health. Henry bought a large brick mansion in Moama, New South Wales, in August 1857 and opened the Prince of Wales Hotel. From there, he co-operated Robison and Stivens, coach proprietors for the Bendigo-Moama-Deniliquin service. The hotel was Robson's first home. Henry died in Moama Maiden's Punt on 27 January 1860. (Note: Nissen states that Robson was seven when her father died, but her father died in 1860 and she was born in 1858. Robson says in her biography for Theatre Magazine that she was three months old when her father died.)

On 19 November 1862, Julia married Walter Moore Miller, solicitor and mayor of Albury, New South Wales, at St Paul's Cathedral, Melbourne. Julia, Walter and the four children moved to Melbourne in 1866. Miller was a partner with De Courcy Ireland in the firm of Miller & Ireland in Melbourne in November 1867, and until 20 January 1870, when it was mutually dissolved.

In 1870, the family moved to London. (Note: Nissen says that the family moved to London when Robson was seven.) Robson attended Sacred Heart Convent School at Highgate in north London and studied languages in Brussels. She went to Paris for her examinations in French. According to her obituary, she was also educated in Australia.

== Marriages and children ==
Robson ran away from home to marry her first husband, 18-year-old Charles Leveson Gore, in London. They were married on 1 November 1875 at the parish church in Camden Town, London. (Note: Although Robson said that she was 16 when she married, she was 17 years of age, based upon her date of birth, when she married Charles Gore. Her husband's name has been said to be Charles Leveson Gore, Charles Livingston Gore, Edward H. Gore, and E. H. Gore.) They traveled on the steamer SS Vaderland and arrived in New York City on 17 May 1877. They purchased 380 acres of land in Fort Worth, Texas, where they built a house and established a cattle ranch. According to Jan Jones, "the Gores survived two years in their prairie manor house before homesickness, rural isolation, and repeated bouts of fever convinced them to sell and try their fortunes in the more settled East." They moved to New York City with little money, and Robson said that Gore died shortly thereafter. (Note: According to Jan Jones, when Gore wanted to return to England, Robson decided that she wanted to stay in New York City and the couple divorced. Gore returned to London. He died in the early 1880s.)

Robson supported her children by crocheting hoods and embroidery, designing dinner cards, and teaching painting. By the time she began her acting career in 1883, two of her three children had died from illnesses, (Note: Robson says that the children both died of scarlet fever. Axel Nissen states the causes of death as diphtheria and scarlet fever. Who's Who on the stage states that the children's death came about as the result of poverty (i.e., not a specific cause of death, but an influencing factor).) leaving only Edward Hyde Leveson Gore. (Note: Her son, whose full name was Edward Hyde Leveson Gore, was born on December 2, 1876 and died September 23, 1954 Her son Edward and daughter-in-law were alive at the time of his mother's death. They had a son, Robson Gore.)

Six years after beginning her stage career, Robson married Augustus Homer Brown, a police surgeon, on 29 May 1889. They were together until his death on 1 April 1920. Robson's son, Edward Gore, was her business manager.

== Career ==
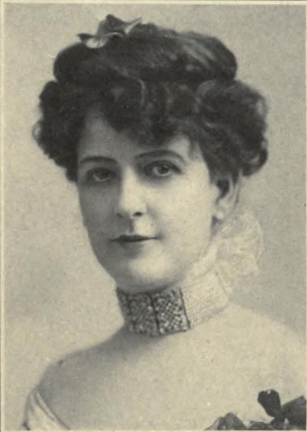
May Robson in 1907

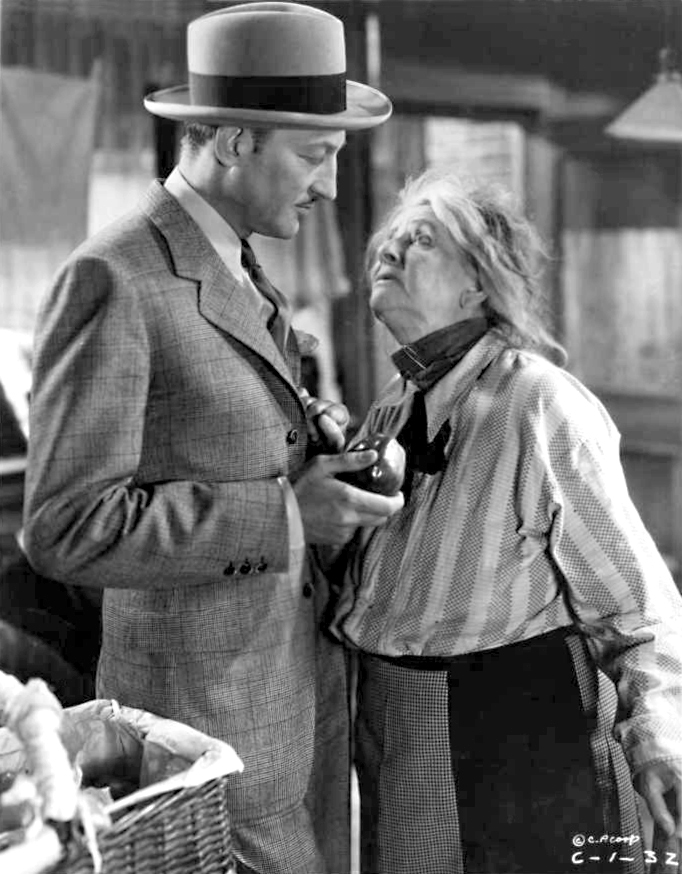
Warren William and May Robson in Lady for a Day (1933)

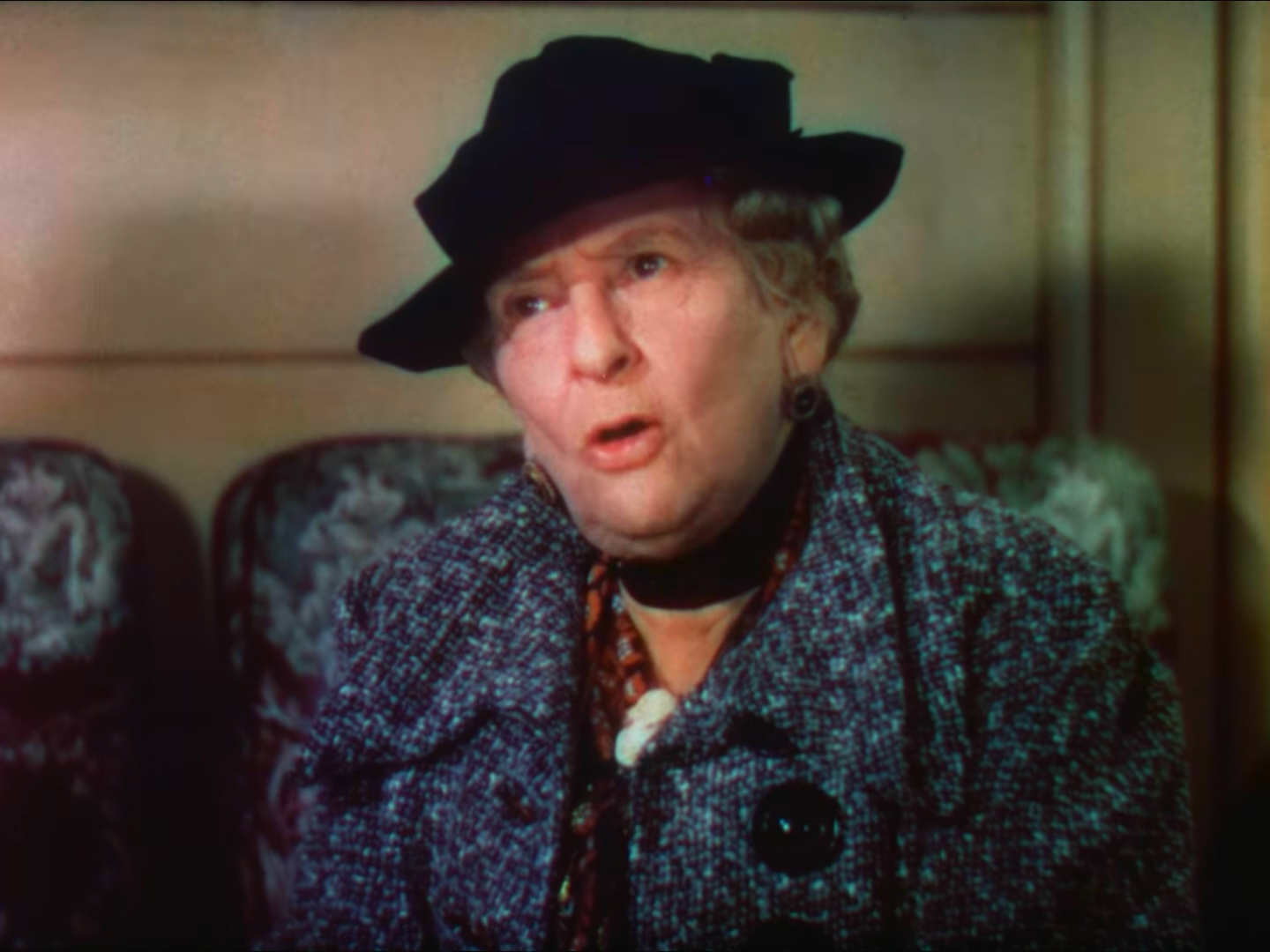
May Robson in A Star is Born (1937)

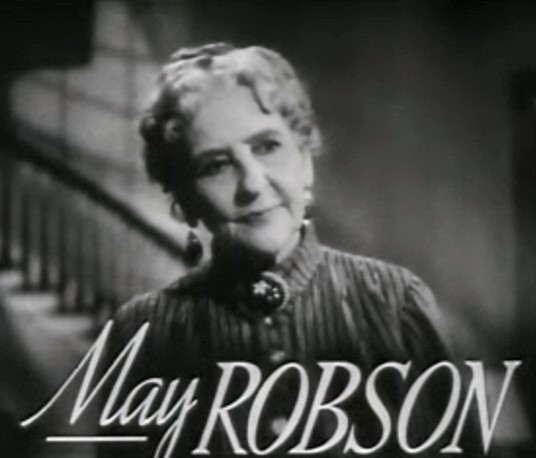
May Robson in Four Daughters (1938)

On 17 September 1883, Robison became an actress in Hoop of Gold at the Brooklyn Grand Opera House stage. Her name was misspelled "Robson" in the billing, and she used it from that point forward "for good luck". Over the next several decades, she flourished on the stage as a comedian and character actress. Her success was due partly to her affiliation with powerful manager and producer Charles Frohman and the Theatrical Syndicate. She established her own touring theatrical company in 1911.

Robson's initial appearances in film date back as early as 1903 or 1904 with uncredited roles in Edison short film productions. She appeared as herself in a cameo in the 1915 silent film How Molly Made Good; which was probably her first feature film, and starred in the 1916 silent film A Night Out, an adaptation of the play that she co-wrote, The Three Lights. She picked up another film role in 1916, appearing in the Marguerite Clark version of Snow White, and in 1919, made a guest appearance in the Jack Pickford In Wrong. Respected and firmly established in the theater, Robson's fame and recognition allowed her to appear in films uncredited. As so many silent films are missing or lost, she may have appeared in many more.

In 1927, she went to Hollywood, where she began a successful film career as a senior woman, often in comedic roles and nearly rivaling her longtime friend Marie Dressler. Among her starring roles was in The She-Wolf (1931) as a miserly millionaire businesswoman, based on real-life miser Hetty Green.

She also starred in the final segment of the anthology film If I Had a Million (1932) as a rest-home resident who gets a new lease on life when she receives a $1,000,000 check from a dying business tycoon. She played the Queen of Hearts in Alice in Wonderland (1933), Countess Vronsky in Anna Karenina (1935), Aunt Elizabeth in Bringing Up Baby (1938), Aunt Polly in The Adventures of Tom Sawyer (1938), and a sharp-tongued Granny in A Star Is Born (1937). She was top-billed as late as 1940, starring in Granny Get Your Gun at 82. Her last film was 1942's Joan of Paris.

== Academy Award nomination ==
In 1934, at age 75, Robson was nominated for an Academy Award for Best Actress for Lady for a Day, but lost to Katharine Hepburn. Both actresses appeared in the Hepburn–Grant classic Bringing Up Baby (1938).

Robson was the first Australian to be nominated for an acting Oscar, and for many years was also the oldest performer nominated.

== Death ==
Robson died in 1942 at her Beverly Hills, California, home at age 84. In her obituary, the Nevada State Journal said that she died of "a combination of ailments, aggravated by neuritis and advanced age." (Note: She was critically ill for three weeks before her death and in ill health for months before. A biographical sketch of Robson in the Notable American Women, 1607–1950 stated that she died of cancer.) Her remains were cremated and buried at the Flushing Cemetery in Queens, New York, next to those of her second husband, Augustus Brown.

The New York Times called Robson the "dowager queen of the American screen and stage".

== Works ==
=== Stage ===
The following is a partial list of her stage performances:

- Called Back (1884)
- An Appeal to the Muse (1885)
- Robert Elsmere (1889)
- The Charity Ball (1890)
- Nerves, adapted from Les Femmes Nerveuses (1891)
- Gloriana (1892)
- Lady Bountiful (1892)
- Americans Abroad (1893)
- The Family Circle (1893)
- The Poet and the Puppets (1893)
- Squirrel Inn (1893)
- No. 3A (1894)
- As You Like It (1894)
- Liberty Hall (1894)
- The Fatal Card (1895)
- The Importance of Being Earnest (1895)
- A Woman's Reason (1895)
- The First Born (1897)
- His Excellency, The Governor (1900)
- Are You a Mason? (1901)
- The Billionaire (1902)
- Dorothy Vernon of Haddon Hall (1904)
- Cousin Billy (1905–1907)
- The Rejuvenation of Aunt Mary (1907)
- The Three Lights (A Night Out) (1911)

=== Filmography ===
==== Silent ====
Year	Film	Role	Notes
1906	The Terrible Kids		Short
1907	Getting Evidence		Short
1915	How Molly Made Good	Herself	
1916	A Night Out	Granmum	
1916	Snow White	Hex Witch	Replaced originally scheduled Alice Washburn
1919	In Wrong	Woman visiting store	Uncredited
1920	Dr. Jekyll and Mr. Hyde	Prostitute outside of music hall	Uncredited
1926	Pals in Paradise	Esther Lezinsky	
1927	Rubber Tires	Mrs. Stack	
1927	The King of Kings	Mother of Gestas	
1927	The Rejuvenation of Aunt Mary	Aunt Mary Watkins	
1927	The Angel of Broadway	Big Bertha	
1927	A Harp in Hock	Mrs. Banks	
1927	Turkish Delight	Tsakran	
1927	Chicago	Mrs. Morton - Matron	
1928	The Blue Danube		

==== Sound ====
Year	Film	Role	Notes
1931	The She-Wolf	Harriet Breen	
1932	Letty Lynton	Mrs. Lynton, Letty's Mother	
1932	Red-Headed Woman	Aunt Jane	
1932	Strange Interlude	Mrs. Evans	
1932	Little Orphan Annie	Mrs. Stewart	
1932	If I Had a Million	Mrs. Mary Walker	
1933	Men Must Fight	Maman Seward	
1933	The White Sister	Mother Superior	
1933	Reunion in Vienna	Frau Lucher	
1933	Dinner at Eight	Mrs. Wendel, the cook	
1933	One Man's Journey	Sarah	
1933	Broadway to Hollywood	Veteran Actress	
1933	Beauty for Sale	Mrs. Merrick	
1933	Lady for a Day	Apple Annie	Nominated - Academy Award for Best Actress
1933	The Solitaire Man	Mrs. Vail	
1933	Dancing Lady	Dolly Todhunter	
1933	Alice in Wonderland	Queen of Hearts	
1934	You Can't Buy Everything	Mrs. Hannah Bell	
1934	Straight Is the Way	Mrs. Horowitz	
1934	Lady by Choice	Patricia Patterson	
1934	Mills of the Gods	Mary Hastings	
1935	Grand Old Girl	Laura Bayles	
1935	Vanessa: Her Love Story	Madame Judith Paris	
1935	Reckless	Granny	
1935	Strangers All	Anna Carter	
1935	Age of Indiscretion	Emma Shaw	
1935	Anna Karenina	Countess Vronsky	
1935	Three Kids and a Queen	Mary Jane 'Queenie' Baxter	
1936	Wife vs. Secretary	Mimi Stanhope	
1936	The Captain's Kid	Aunt Marcia Prentiss	
1936	Rainbow on the River	Mrs. Harriet Ainsworth	
1937	Woman in Distress	Phoebe Tuttle	
1937	A Star Is Born	Grandmother Lettie Blodgett	
1937	The Perfect Specimen	Mrs. Leona Wicks	
1938	The Adventures of Tom Sawyer	Aunt Polly	
1938	Bringing Up Baby	Aunt Elizabeth	
1938	Four Daughters	Aunt Etta	
1938	The Texans	Granna	
1939	They Made Me a Criminal	Grandma	
1939	Yes, My Darling Daughter	'Granny' Whitman	
1939	The Kid from Kokomo	Margaret 'Maggie' / 'Ma' Manell	
1939	Daughters Courageous	Penny, the Housekeeper	
1939	Nurse Edith Cavell	Mme. Rappard	
1939	That's Right—You're Wrong	Grandma	
1939	Four Wives	Aunt Etta	
1940	Granny Get Your Gun	Minerva Hatton	
1940	Irene	Granny O'Dare	
1940	Texas Rangers Ride Again	Cecilia Dangerfield	
1941	Four Mothers	Aunt Etta	
1941	Million Dollar Baby	Cornelia Wheelwright	
1941	Playmates	Grandma Kyser	
1942	Joan of Paris	Mlle. Rosay	Final film role

== See also ==
- List of Academy Award winners and nominees from Australia
- List of oldest and youngest Academy Award winners and nominees
