= Dorothy Bennett =

American screenwriter

- Born: November 25, 1907; DeKalb, Indiana, USA
- Died: August 29, 1988 (aged 80); San Diego, California, USA
- Occupation: Screenwriter
- Spouse: Link Hannah

Dorothy Bennett (sometimes credited as Dorothy Hannah) was an American screenwriter, novelist, and playwright who worked in Hollywood from the 1930s through the 1940s.

== Biography ==
Bennett worked in advertising before finding success as a playwright on Broadway. Before collaborating with Irving White, Dorothy wrote two other plays: Sixteen in August and A Woman's A Fool. After Hollywood produced several big-screen adaptations of her plays, she moved to Los Angeles and took on work at MGM as a screenwriter. With actor/playwright John Irving White they wrote the play Fly Away Home in 1939.This became the film Daughters Courageous starring John Garfield and the Lane sisters, released in 1939.

Bennett married to Link Hannah, who she met while working in advertising. The pair, who occasionally wrote plays together, had three children.

== Selected filmography ==
- The Brasher Doubloon (1947)
- Do You Love Me (1946)
- Patrick the Great (1945)
- Sensations of 1945 (1944)
- Show Business (1944)
- All by Myself (1943)
- Mister Big (1943)
- Follow the Band (1943)
- It Comes Up Love (1943)
- When Johnny Comes Marching Home (1942)
- Always in My Heart (1942)
- Daughters Courageous (1939)
- Life Begins with Love (1937)
- Wives Never Know (1936)
