= The Oklahoma Kid =

1939 film

- Directed by: Lloyd Bacon
- Written by: Wally Kline; Edward E. Paramore
- Produced by: Samuel Bischoff; Hal B. Wallis
- Starring: James Cagney; Humphrey Bogart; Rosemary Lane; Donald Crisp
- Cinematography: James Wong Howe
- Edited by: Owen Marks
- Music by: Max Steiner; Stephen Foster
- Production company: Warner Bros. Pictures
- Distributed by: Warner Bros. Pictures
- Release date: March 3, 1939
- Running time: 85 minutes
- Language: English

The Oklahoma Kid is a 1939 Western film starring James Cagney and Humphrey Bogart. The film was directed by Lloyd Bacon for Warner Bros. Pictures. Cagney plays an adventurous gunslinger in a broad-brimmed cowboy hat while Bogart portrays his black-clad and viciously villainous nemesis. The film is often remembered for Cagney's character rubbing the thumb and forefinger of his hand together and exulting, "Feel that air!"

The supporting cast features Rosemary Lane, Donald Crisp, and Ward Bond. Rosemary Lane's sister Priscilla Lane also starred with Cagney and Bogart in The Roaring Twenties that same year.

== Plot ==
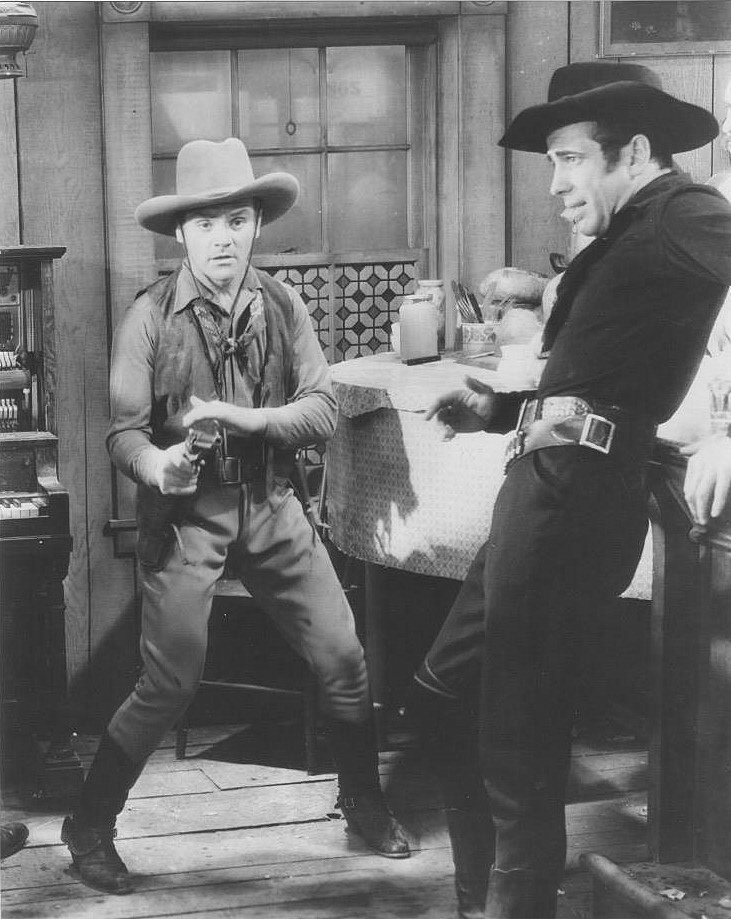
James Cagney and Humphrey Bogart in The Oklahoma Kid

President Cleveland signs a law allowing sale of the Cherokee Strip in the Oklahoma Territory. After the money arrives by train, it is loaded onto a stagecoach which is later robbed by Whip McCord's gang. But the Oklahoma Kid ambushes the gang and makes off with the loot. Meanwhile, settlers pour in to stake their property claims in what would be the Land Run of 1893. Before the run begins, however, McCord and associates sneak through the guarded line to stake a claim before the actual run is declared open. When it is, John Kincaid and his son Ned arrive and confront McCord, who demands saloon and gambling concessions in exchange for the site they illegally claimed. The area is developed and becomes the city of Tulsa. Under McCord's influence, though, it becomes riddled with corruption and violence. Hoping to bring about law and order, Judge Hardwick and Ned campaign to elect John Kincaid as mayor. But when another candidate is killed, McCord frames Kincaid and has him arrested for murder.

Later, the Kid learns of Kincaid's arrest from a newspaper article. He rides into town in order to free Kincaid. He breaks into Tulsa's jail and enters Kincaid's cell. Here, the identity of the Oklahoma Kid is revealed. He is actually Jim Kincaid, the disenfranchised son of John Kincaid and brother of Ned. And as if to reinforce Jim's status as the family's anarchic "black sheep," his father remains true to his belief in the principles of law and order. He refuses to escape, opting instead to fight his arrest judicially. The Kid then leaves before being caught and jailed himself. But upon learning that the Kid is John Kincaid's son, McCord incites a mob at his saloon. Then, led by three of his own men, they break into the jail and lynch Kincaid over the outside balcony of the jailhouse.

In revenge, the Kid tracks down his father's killers. He slays three of them, but brings back a fourth, Ace Doolin, to testify against McCord. Ned and the Kid seek out McCord at his saloon. While attempting an arrest, however, Ned is shot by McCord. The Kid and McCord then engage in a fist fight. The Kid is nearly killed, but Ned shoots down McCord before dying himself. Afterwards, Jane Hardwick, a close family friend, asks the Kid to stay, but he declares his intention to leave his unhappy memories of Oklahoma behind and head for the Arizona Territory. Jane notes that if he plans to engage in anti-authoritarian "empire-building," he won't be able to do it by himself. Then, Jane's father, Judge Hardwick arrives and, despite The Kid's mild and short-lived protests, Jane has her father quickly marry the two.

== Cast ==
- James Cagney as Jim Kincaid / "The Oklahoma Kid"
- Humphrey Bogart as Whip McCord
- Rosemary Lane as Jane Hardwick
- Donald Crisp as Judge Hardwick
- Harvey Stephens as Ned Kincaid
- Hugh Sothern as John Kincaid
- Charles Middleton as Alec Martin
- Edward Pawley as Ace Doolin
- Ward Bond as Wes Handley
- Lew Harvey as Ed Curley
- Trevor Bardette as Indian Jack Pasco
- John Miljan as Ringo (the lawyer)
- Arthur Aylesworth as Judge Morgan
- Irving Bacon as Hotel Clerk
- Joe Devlin as Keely
- Wade Boteler as Sheriff Abe Collins

== Reception ==
Cagney's performance was ridiculed for not deviating at all from his screen persona. The New York Times quipped, "There's something entirely disarming about the way he has tackled horse opera, not pretending a minute to be anything but New York's Jimmy Cagney all dressed up for a dude ranch."
