= Katrina cough =

Respiratory illness

Katrina cough is a putative respiratory illness thought to be linked to exposure to mold and dust after the 2005 Hurricane Katrina in the United States. First described by doctors treating patients in the metro New Orleans, area symptoms include cough, sinus headache, congestion, runny nose, and sore throat, and pink eye. This condition may make immunocompromised individuals more susceptible to bacterial bronchitis and sinusitis. Most patients are treated with antihistamines, nasal sprays, and/or antibiotics.

== Case-control study ==
The Louisiana Office of Public Health conducted a case-control study of emergency department visits in New Orleans in the aftermath of Hurricane Katrina. The OPH distributed a questionnaire to patients seeking treatment for cough, sinus drip, sneezing, wheezing, chest congestion, swollen red and puffy eye(s) and sore throat. According to the study, state epidemiologists found no increase in the rate of New Orleans-area respiratory illnesses. Although rates were found to be no different in comparison to state and country rates, the study showed that people with chronic sinus or respiratory symptoms were more affected by the hurricane.

== Disputed existence ==
State epidemiologist Dr. Raoult Ratard disputed the existence of any disease cluster associated with the hurricane in 2006: "There is no such thing as a single condition such as ‘Katrina Cough’ that would be different from the bacterial and viral respiratory conditions we would expect to see at that time of year...no such outbreak occurred because of Hurricane Katrina."

== Five-year study ==
Starting in 2008, Henry Glindmeyer, researcher and professor of pulmonary, critical care and environmental medicine at the Tulane University School of Medicine is conducting a five-year study to determine if workers in New Orleans face risks from inhalant exposure to minute particles such as mold, fungi or bacteria. The study is funded by the National Institute for Occupational Safety and Health, an agency of the Centers for Disease Control and Prevention, which is providing $1.86 million.

== See also ==
- Allergy
- Coccidioidomycosis
