= Gale Page =

American actress (1913–1983)

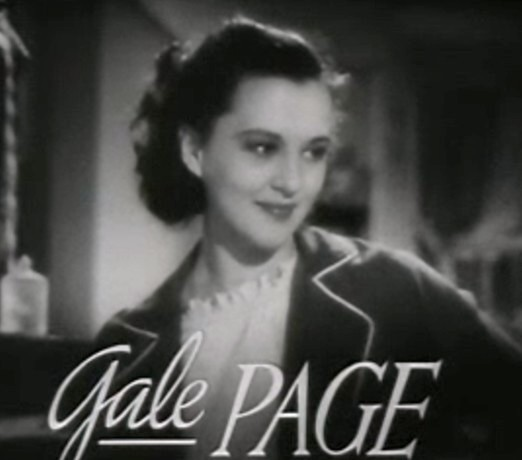
- Trailer for Four Daughters (1938)
- Born: Sally Perkins Rutter; July 29, 1910
- Died: January 8, 1983 (aged 72)
- Occupation: Actress
- Years active: 1934–1964
- Known for: Four Daughters
- Spouses: Frederick M. Tritschler (div. 1939) Aldo Solito de Solis (m. 1942; died 1973)
- Children: 3

Gale Page (born Sally Perkins Rutter; July 29, 1910 – January 8, 1983) was an American singer and actress.

== Early life ==
Page was the daughter of R.L. and Isabel (née Gale) Rutter of Spokane, Washington. Her aunt and uncle were Elizabeth Gale Page and Miles Poindexter, a U.S. senator from Washington and later U.S. Ambassador to Peru. She was also the great-granddaughter of Joseph Gale, the first governor of Oregon.

== Career ==
=== Radio ===
Page was a radio actress and singer before being signed to a Hollywood film contract by Warner Brothers in 1938.

She sang on a Spokane station before getting a job on KYW radio in Chicago, Illinois, subsequently moving to NBC, where her network activities included singing on Fibber McGee and Molly. Page was cast as blues singer Gertrude Lamont in the 1935 soap opera Masquerade. Beginning on May 27, 1936, she played Gloria Marsh on the soap opera Today's Children. In the summer of 1939, she co-starred with Jim Ameche on Hollywood Playhouse.

=== Film ===
Page made her film debut in Crime School (1938) with Humphrey Bogart and also appeared in The Amazing Dr. Clitterhouse (1938) before winning the role of the fourth daughter in Four Daughters (1938). She co-starred in this with the Lane Sisters and was the only film "daughter" not played by one of the Lanes. Page appeared in three other films with the Lane sisters: Daughters Courageous (1939) and the two "Four Daughters" sequels: Four Wives (1939) and Four Mothers (1941).

Page appeared in only 16 films during her career, including Heart of the North (1938), You Can't Get Away with Murder (1939), Naughty but Nice (1939), They Drive by Night (1940), Knute Rockne, All American (1940), The Time of Your Life (1948), and Anna Lucasta (1949).

=== Television ===
Page was a semi-regular performer on the television series Robert Montgomery Presents from 1954 until 1957.

== Personal life ==
Page was first married to Frederick M. Tritschler, with whom she had a son. They divorced on October 20, 1939.

On August 17, 1942, Page married Count Aldo Solìto de Solis, a pianist and composer. In 1943, they had twins, Marina Francesca and Luchino Giovanni. By this marriage the actress acquired the title Countess Solìto de Solis. The count died in 1973, a decade before his wife.
