= Four Mothers =

1941 film by William Keighley

- Movie poster
- Directed by: William Keighley
- Written by: Stephen Morehouse Avery
- Produced by: Henry Blanke (associate producer); Hal B. Wallis (executive producer)
- Starring: Priscilla Lane; Rosemary Lane; Lola Lane; Gale Page
- Cinematography: Charles Rosher
- Edited by: Ralph Dawson
- Music by: Heinz Roemheld
- Production company: Warner Bros. Pictures
- Distributed by: Warner Bros. Pictures
- Release date: January 4, 1941
- Running time: 86 minutes
- Country: United States
- Language: English

Four Mothers is a 1941 American drama film and sequel to Four Daughters (1938) and Four Wives (1939). The film stars Claude Rains, Jeffrey Lynn, May Robson and features the Lane Sisters: Priscilla Lane, Rosemary Lane and Lola Lane. It was directed by William Keighley and is based on the story "Sister Act" by Fannie Hurst. The film was released by Warner Bros. Pictures on January 4, 1941. The Lane sisters appeared in all three films and also appeared together in the 1939 film Daughters Courageous.

== Plot ==
In this final installment of Warner Brothers' Four Daughters series, the entire Lemp family loses its investment in son-in-law Ben Crowley's (Frank McHugh) out-of-state realty project when a hurricane destroys the development site. So Ben suggests they localize and develop their own property to sell, but no one in town will help finance the venture after the hurricane debacle. So in order to get their hands on some much-needed cash, the Lemp family patriarch, Adam (Claude Rains), sells the house in which he raised his daughters. To his shock, however, he learns the person who bought it is planning to raze the old structure to make way for an apartment building.

To do his part in bringing in more dollars for the family, son-in-law Felix (Jeffery Lynn) travels to Chicago for a job conducting an orchestra. Meanwhile, Kay (Rosemary Lane), the only Lemp daughter who is childless, is upset that husband Clint (Eddie Albert) spends more time at work than with her at home. Things get worse after his lab research leads him closer to the cause of Pneumoconiosis at the town's smelting plant. Eventually, Kay has had it. She too leaves for Chicago—to seek a job in radio. But for both Felix and Kay, the big city proves to hold no suitable alternative to either their financial or family woes. So they both return home.

After moving into an apartment with his sister Etta (May Robson), Adam is invited to conduct for the Beethoven Music Festival at the Hollywood Bowl in Los Angeles. The whole family travels there to proudly watch him. They then return home for the opening of Lemp Acres, the new property Ben has started and developed for the family. Upon Adam's arrival, he finds he has regained the respect of the town—so much so that the townspeople financed the moving of his old house to Lemp Acres, and all is the same as it once was. In the end, as the four daughters hold one of their musical practice sessions, Kay realizes she is finally pregnant.

== Cast ==
- Priscilla Lane as Ann Lemp Deitz (the mother of Ellen)
- Rosemary Lane as Kay Lemp Forrest
- Lola Lane as Thea Lemp Crowley (the mother of Twins)
- Gale Page as Emma Lemp Talbot (the mother of Caroline)
- Claude Rains as Adam Lemp (the maternal grandfather of Ellen, Caroline & Twins)
- Jeffrey Lynn as Felix Deitz (the father of Ellen)
- Eddie Albert as Clint Forrest
- May Robson as Aunt Etta (the maternal great-aunt of Ellen, Caroline & Twins)
- Frank McHugh as Ben Crowley (the father of Twins)
- Dick Foran as Ernest Talbot (the father of Caroline)
- Vera Lewis as Mrs. Ridgefield
