= Four Wives =

1939 film by Michael Curtiz

- Movie poster
- Directed by: Michael Curtiz
- Written by: Julius J. Epstein; Philip G. Epstein; Maurice Hanline
- Based on: Sister Act suggested 1937 story in Hearst's International Cosmopolitan by Fannie Hurst
- Produced by: Henry Blanke (associate producer); Hal B. Wallis (executive producer)
- Starring: Priscilla Lane; Rosemary Lane; Lola Lane; Gale Page
- Cinematography: Sol Polito
- Edited by: Ralph Dawson
- Music by: Max Steiner
- Distributed by: Warner Bros. Pictures
- Release date: December 25, 1939
- Running time: 110 minutes
- Country: United States
- Language: English

Four Wives is a 1939 American drama film starring the Lane Sisters (Priscilla Lane, Rosemary Lane, Lola Lane) and Gale Page. The film was directed by Michael Curtiz and is based on the story "Sister Act" by Fannie Hurst. The supporting cast features Claude Rains, Jeffrey Lynn, Eddie Albert, Frank McHugh and Dick Foran. The picture is a sequel to Four Daughters (1938) and was followed by Four Mothers (1941). Four Wives was released by Warner Bros. Pictures on December 25, 1939.

== Plot ==
Ann Lemp Borden is widowed when her husband, Mickey Borden, a down-and-out and unlucky musical genius, dies in a car accident. No one knows that Borden committed suicide, crashing deliberately. Ann lives at home with her father, Aunt Etta and next oldest sister Kay, who is dating young doctor Clint Forrest Jr. Her two other sisters, Emma and Thea, are married and hoping to have children.

Ann, who is engaged to her first love, composer Felix Dietz, discovers that she is pregnant with Mickey's child. Haunted by memories of Mickey, she is unsure about marrying Felix. A flashback shows Mickey playing his unfinished composition “that has only a middle…no beginning…no ending”. Ann frequently replays the tune in her head or on the piano. Ann is distressed over the raw deal that life dealt to Mickey. Felix eventually convinces Ann to marry him and they elope, but Ann is still caught up in the past tragedy. Felix finishes Mickey's composition and conducts it on a national radio broadcast, making a speech commemorating Mickey's genius and untimely death.

Listening to the broadcast, Ann is convinced that Mickey Borden did not live in vain, Ann comes back to reality, rediscovers her love for Felix and, together with her family, goes on to have a normal, happy life complete with her child, nieces and nephews.

== Cast ==
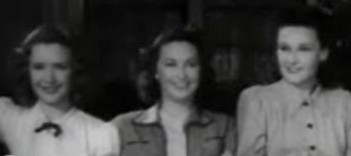
Priscilla, Rosemary, and Lola Lane in Four Wives

- Priscilla Lane as Ann Lemp Dietz
- Rosemary Lane as Kay Lemp
- Lola Lane as Thea Lemp Crowley
- Gale Page as Emma Lemp Talbot
- Claude Rains as Adam Lemp
- Jeffrey Lynn as Felix Dietz
- Eddie Albert as Clint Forrest Jr.
- May Robson as Aunt Etta
- Frank McHugh as Ben Crowley
- Dick Foran as Ernest Talbot
- Henry O'Neill as Clinton Forrest Sr.
- John Garfield as Mickey Borden
- Vera Lewis as Mrs. Ridgefield
- John Qualen as Frank

== Reception ==
On December 23, 1939, Frank Nugent of The New York Times writes: "Sequels so rarely even approximate the quality of their originals that the Warners deserve a special word of commendation this morning for their 'Four Wives,' the Strand's inevitable aftermath to the 'Four Daughters' which appeared on most of the ten-best lists last year. For it is a singularly happy film, well-written, well-directed and well-played, and it reconciles us tranquilly to the vista it has opened of a 'Four Mothers' (although part of that already has been realized), a 'Four Grandmothers' and possibly a 'Four Granddaughters.' The film runs its course entertainingly, making its little jokes about fatherhood, having its fun with the new matrimonial prospect's introduction to the family, regaining its dignity in the moments devoted to consideration of the posthumous problem child. The old cast has been assembled again: the Lane sisters, Gale Page, Claude Rains, May Robson, Frank McHugh, Dick Foran and Mr. Lynn; John Garfield appears briefly in memories, and Eddie Albert is the new young man, a young doctor with a high opinion of Pasteur and Ehrlich (both being Warner productions). (Nugent is referring to two hit Warner films, Dr. Ehrlich's Magic Bullet and The Story of Louis Pasteur.) “A pleasant family reunion all around, in fact, being a tribute not merely to the Lemps but to the Lane sisters who play it, to the Epstein brothers who have written it, and to the Warners who have produced it."

== Home media ==
Warner Archive released Four Wives on DVD on August 1, 2011. The film was also released by Warner Archive in the Four Daughters Movie Series Collection.
