= Four Daughters (1938 film) =

1938 film by Michael Curtiz

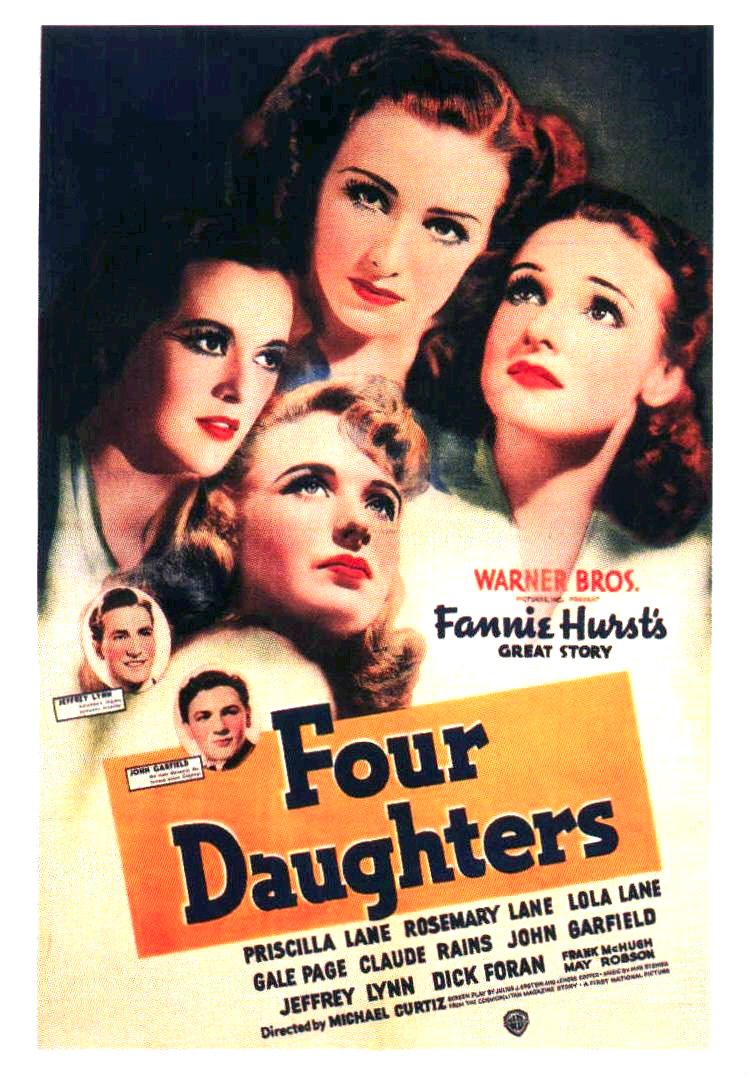
- Theatrical release poster
- Directed by: Michael Curtiz
- Written by: Lawrence Kimble; Thyra Samter Winslow
- Screenplay by: Lenore J. Coffee; Julius J. Epstein
- Based on: Sister Act; 1937 Hearst's International-Cosmopolitan story by Fannie Hurst
- Produced by: Hal B. Wallis
- Starring: Priscilla Lane; Rosemary Lane; Lola Lane; Gale Page
- Cinematography: Ernest Haller
- Edited by: Ralph Dawson
- Music by: Max Steiner
- Production company: Warner Bros. Pictures
- Distributed by: Warner Bros. Pictures
- Release date: August 9, 1938 (USA)
- Running time: 90 minutes
- Country: United States
- Language: English

Four Daughters is a 1938 American romance film that tells the story of a happy musical family whose lives and loves are disrupted by the arrival of a charming young composer who interjects himself into the daughters' romantic lives. His cynical, bitter musician friend comes to help orchestrate his latest composition and complicates matters even more. The movie stars the Lane Sisters (Priscilla Lane, Rosemary Lane, and Lola Lane) and Gale Page, and features Claude Rains, Jeffrey Lynn, John Garfield, and Dick Foran. The three Lanes were sisters and members of a family singing trio.

The film was written by Lenore J. Coffee and Julius J. Epstein, adapted from the 1937 Fannie Hurst story "Sister Act", and was directed by Michael Curtiz. The movie's success led to two sequels with more or less the same cast: Four Wives and Four Mothers. The same cast—with the addition of Fay Bainter and Donald Crisp—appeared in the film Daughters Courageous, which had no connection with the Lemp family trilogy.

== Plot ==
The Lemp sisters, Emma (Gale Page), Thea (Lola Lane), Kay (Rosemary Lane), and Ann (Priscilla Lane) are accomplished musicians in a musical family headed by their widowed father, Adam (Claude Rains), who plays the flute. Harpist Emma, the oldest daughter, is the object of a neighbor's affection, but she rebuffs Ernest's (Dick Foran) attentions. Thea, a pianist and the second eldest, is courted by wealthy Ben Crowley (Frank McHugh), another neighbor, but she is not sure she loves him. Kay, the third daughter, is a talented singer and has a chance at a music school scholarship but doesn't want to leave home. The youngest daughter is Ann, a violinist.

One day, Ann's violin practice is interrupted by the sound of their front gate squeaking. She instructs the young man making free with it in the finer points of the art, and introduces him to an apparently disapproving passerby, Mrs. Ridgefield, a local gossip. This charmer is young composer Felix Deitz (Jeffrey Lynn), come to work at the foundation where Adam is Dean. He has a letter of introduction to Adam, and while they talk, the girls set the dinner table with the very best silver. All four daughters are attracted to Felix, and they soon invite him to room with the family. He also charms Aunt Etta. Felix hopes to win a prize with his latest composition. Enter Felix's friend Mickey (John Garfield), a cynical orchestral arranger whose hard life has given him a grim view of existence. He falls for Ann, and is crushed when she announces at Adam's birthday party that she and Felix are engaged.

An hour before Ann and Felix are to marry, Mickey tells Ann how he feels—and that Emma is “insane” about Felix. Through a window, Ann observes Emma's distress when she ties Felix's tie before the ceremony. Everyone is wondering where Ann is when a telegram arrives, addressed to Emma, telling them she has eloped with Mickey. Ernest calmly steps in to tell the guests.

Four months later, Ann and Mickey are living a hard life in New York City, professing love for each other but poor and unhappy. Mickey is invited to form a band and go to South America with some fellow musicians, but cannot afford passage. Ann forbids him to ask Ben for the money and asks Mickey if he would go if she weren't hung around his neck.

The family meets at the Lemps' house for Christmas, except Kay, who is singing on the radio that night. Emma did not get together with Felix; she is now engaged to Ernest. Felix is alone and unhappy, though the composition Mickey helped to orchestrate won a prize: a contract with the Seattle Symphony Orchestra. He is to leave that very night. While Kay sings Mendelssohn's “On Wings of Song,” the camera passes over the listening family, revealing much. Ann, moved to tears, takes out her handkerchief and drops two pawn tickets. Felix sees them—one is for a bracelet he'd given her earlier in the year.

Mickey drives Felix to the train station in Ben's car, dropping Ben at the drugstore. He apologizes to Felix, who says it is all in the past. Felix offers Mickey a loan, but Mickey refuses, musing that he must be a new man; the old Mickey would have taken it. As the train pulls out, Felix presses an envelope into his hands and tells him to use it for Ann, “any way you think that will make her happy.” Mickey watches the train leave and is suddenly grim. He gets into the car and drives away. It begins to snow. He turns off the windshield wiper and presses the accelerator to the floor.

In the kitchen, doing dishes, Emma tells Ann that she had thought she was in love with Felix and would have kept on thinking so and spoiled her life if Ann had married him, but she was awakened to Ernest's qualities when he took charge at the wedding. Ann bursts into tears—and Thea screams. Ben is in the hospital.

Adam emerges from the hospital room to tell them that it isn't Ben, it's Mickey. He dies with Ann at his bedside.

It is spring; the trees in the yard are heavy with blossom. The girls and Adam are playing the piece that opened the film. Ann hears the sound of the gate squeaking. It is Felix. The family watches from the house as she welcomes him home and they swing together—until Mrs. Ridgefield approaches. “This is where we came in,” Felix cries, and they run inside. Mrs. Ridgefield looks around and steps onto the gate. The camera pulls slowly back as she swings back and forth, a blissful smile on her face.

== Cast ==
Priscilla Lane as Ann Lemp	John Garfield as Mickey Borden
Rosemary Lane as Kay Lemp	Jeffrey Lynn as Felix Deitz
Lola Lane as Thea Lemp	May Robson as Aunt Etta
Gale Page as Emma Lemp	Frank McHugh as Ben Crowley
Claude Rains as Adam Lemp	Dick Foran as Ernest Talbot

== Production ==
Contemporary sources report that Errol Flynn was originally cast as Felix, but dropped out because of illness. According to TCM, Flynn was actually unhappy with the size of the part. Modern sources indicate that Michael Curtiz wanted Burgess Meredith to play Mickey, but he was unavailable. Garfield modeled his performance on troubled pianist Oscar Levant (with whom Garfield would later co-star in 1946's Humoresque). Garfield's characterization of Mickey in this, his first major film role, defined his screen personality for many future roles.

The classical music that plays a key part in the film is not identified and the composers are not credited on screen. The only onscreen credit is “Music by Max Steiner”. Records credit Franz Schubert and his Serenade, which opens the film and is played again near the end. According to TCM.com, Harry Warren, Al Dubin, Allie Wrubel, Elliot Grennard, Hugo Friedhofer, Heinz Roemheld and Bernard Kaun contributed to the music. Max Rabinowitz composed "Mickey's Theme," and also played the piano off-screen during Garfield's performance. Ray Heindorf handled the orchestration.

== Reception ==
The movie premiered at the Radio City Music Hall, and The New York Times movie review said: "A charming, at times heartbreakingly human, little comedy about life in a musical family of attractive daughters which occasionally is ruffled by the drama of a masculine world outside, Four Daughters, at the Music Hall, tempts one to agree with Jack L. Warner's recent assertion in the advertisements that it is the climax of his career. Putting aside Mr. Warner's career for the nonce, we may assert with equal confidence that Four Daughters is one of the best pictures of anybody's career, if only for the sake of the marvelously meaningful character of Mickey Borden as portrayed by John (formerly Jules) Garfield, who bites off his lines with a delivery so eloquent that we still aren't sure whether it is the dialogue or Mr. Garfield who is so bitterly brilliant."

The New York Times named it one of the year's ten best films. The National Board of Review named Garfield as one of the year's best actors.

The film has a 100% fresh rating on Rotten Tomatoes, based on 10 reviews.

== Accolades ==
Award	Category	Nominee(s)	Result	Ref.
Academy Awards	Outstanding Production	Warner Bros.-First National	Nominated	
Academy Awards	Best Director	Michael Curtiz	Nominated	
Academy Awards	Best Supporting Actor	John Garfield	Nominated	
Academy Awards	Best Screenplay	Julius J. Epstein and Lenore Coffee	Nominated	
Academy Awards	Best Sound Recording	Nathan Levinson	Nominated	
National Board of Review Awards	Best Acting	John Garfield	Won	
New York Film Critics Circle Awards	Best Director	Michael Curtiz	Nominated	
New York Film Critics Circle Awards	Best Actor	John Garfield	Nominated	

== Film series and remake ==
Four Daughters is the first in a series of four films by Warner Bros. featuring the Lane Sisters and the other cast members. It was followed by 1939's Daughters Courageous, also directed by Michael Curtiz and co-starring Claude Rains and John Garfield, though it is a story about a different family. However, the storyline of Four Daughters and the Lemp family is continued in the 1939 film, Four Wives, and 1941's Four Mothers.

Four Daughters was remade in 1954 as Young at Heart, starring Frank Sinatra in the role played by Garfield and Doris Day in Priscilla Lane's part. All the characters' names were changed, the number of daughters was reduced to three, and the young men who vie for the heroine's heart compose songs rather than orchestral music. Young at Heart also has a very different ending: Frank Sinatra's character's suicide attempt fails.

== Home media ==
Warner Archive released Four Daughters on DVD on August 4, 2009. The film was also released by Warner Archive in the "Four Daughters Movie Series Collection" on August 1, 2011.
