= SS Vaderland =

SS Vaderland may refer to one of the following ships of the Red Star Line named after the Dutch word for fatherland:

- SS Vaderland (1873), sailed for Red Star Line from Antwerp to Philadelphia; sold to French concern and renamed Géographique; sunk in collision October 1889
- SS Vaderland (1900), built by John Brown & Co., Glasgow, Scotland; in transatlantic service for Red Star Line and the American Line through 1914, White Star-Dominion from 1914; renamed Southland and used as troopship; torpedoed in Aegean Sea in 1915 and repaired; torpedoed and sunk in Irish Sea by U-70 on 4 June 1916

== See also ==
- SS Vaterland
