= Lola Lane =

American actress (1906–1981)

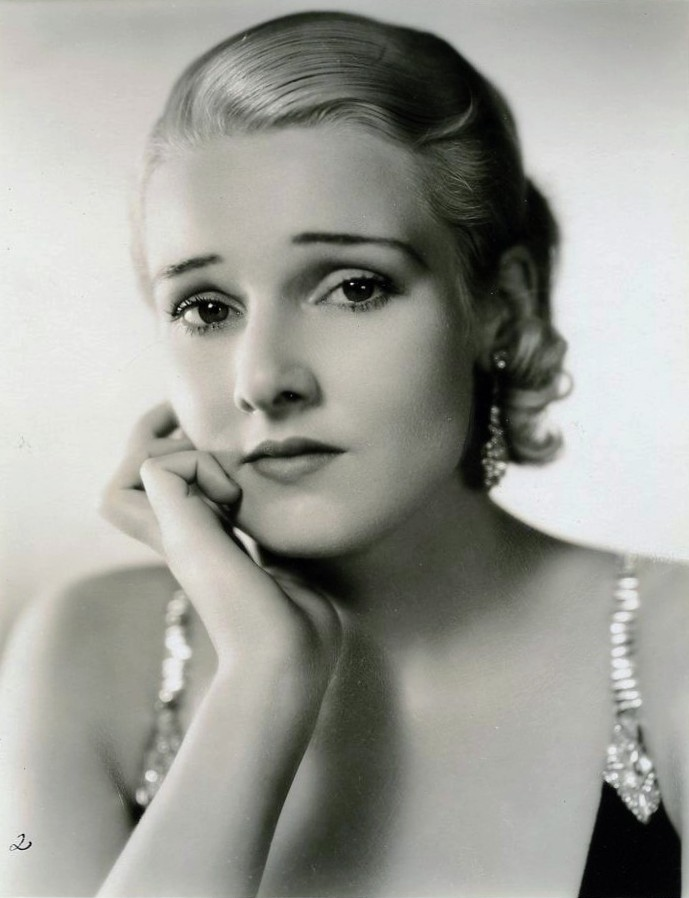
- Lane in 1931
- Born: Dorothy Mullican; May 21, 1906; Macy, Indiana, U.S.
- Died: June 22, 1981 (aged 75); Santa Barbara, California, U.S.
- Resting place: Calvary Cemetery, Santa Barbara
- Occupation: Actress
- Years active: 1929–1946
- Political party: Democratic
- Spouses: Lew Ayres (m. 1931; div. 1933) Henry Clay Dunham (m. 1941; div. 1944) Roland West (m. 1946; died 1952) Robert Hanlon (m. 1955)

Lola Lane (born Dorothy Mullican; May 21, 1906 – June 22, 1981) was an American actress and one of the Lane Sisters with her sisters Leota, Rosemary, and Priscilla Lane. She appeared on Broadway and in films from the 1920s to the 1940s.

== Early years ==
The daughter of a dentist, Lane was born in Macy, Indiana, and grew up in Indianola, Iowa. As a teenager, she played piano for silent films and sang in a flower shop. Vaudeville entertainer Gus Edwards discovered her and put her on the road to her professional career. Lane and her sister Leota graduated from a conservatory at Simpson College and were performing in New York by 1926. Edwards had discovered them performing in a benefit concert in Des Moines, Iowa.

== Career ==
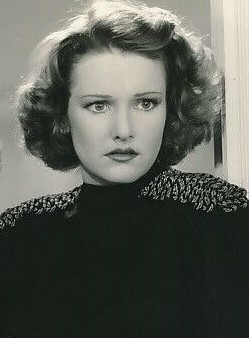
Lane in the 1937 film Marked Woman

Edwards changed the actress's name and added her to his touring production, Ritz Carlton Nights. In 1926, she and her sister Leota appeared in the Greenwich Village Follies in New York City. She went on to appear in vaudeville shows on the Orpheum, Loew, and Interstate circuits and later acted on Broadway in The War Song (1928), leading to her work in films when a talent scout saw her. After a screen test, she made her film debut in Speakeasy (1929).

Most of Lane's films were Warner Bros. productions. They included Four Daughters, Four Wives, and Four Mothers, in each of which she appeared with her sisters Priscilla and Rosemary. She also appeared in the Warner Bros. classic Marked Woman (1937) with Bette Davis and Humphrey Bogart.

== Personal life ==
On September 11, 1931, Lane married actor Lew Ayres in Las Vegas, Nevada. They remained wed until 1933. She was also married to Henry Dunham, a yacht broker, and director Roland West. After his death in 1952, she married Robert Hanlon, a retired aircraft executive.

Like her sisters Rosemary and Priscilla, Lane was a Roman Catholic convert.

== Death ==
Lane died at her home in Santa Barbara, California, on June 22, 1981, at age 75. She was buried at Calvary Cemetery in Santa Barbara.

== Recognition ==
Comic book writer Jerry Siegel named Lois Lane, the fictional Daily Planet reporter and Superman's girlfriend in DC Comics, after Lola Lane.

In 1967 Lane received a Pope Pius X medal for her efforts in religious training of mentally challenged people.

== Filmography ==
- The Girl from Havana (1929) .... Joan Anders
- Fox Movietone Follies of 1929 (1929) .... Lila Beaumont
- Speakeasy (1929) .... Alice Woods
- The Costello Case (1930) .... Mollie
- Good News (1930) .... Patricia Bingham
- The Big Fight (1930) .... Shirly
- Let's Go Places (1930) .... Marjorie Lorraine
- Ex-Bad Boy (1931) .... Letta Lardo
- Hell Bound (1931) .... Platinum Reed
- Public Stenographer (1933) .... Ann McNair
- The Woman Who Dared (1933) .... Kay Wilson
- Burn 'Em Up Barnes (1934) .... Marjorie Temple
- Ticket to a Crime (1934) .... Peggy Cummings
- Port of Lost Dreams (1934) .... Molly Deshon/Molly Clark Christensen
- The Woman Condemned (1934) .... Jane Merrick
- His Night Out (1935) .... Lola
- Death from a Distance (1935) .... Kay Palmer
- Alias Mary Dow (1935) .... Minna
- Murder on a Honeymoon (1935) .... Phyllis La Font
- In Paris, A.W.O.L. (1936) .... Lola
- Hollywood Hotel (1937) .... Mona Marshall
- The Sheik Steps Out (1937) .... Phyllis 'Flip' Murdock
- Marked Woman (1937) .... Dorothy 'Gabby' Marvin
- Four Daughters (1938) .... Thea Lemp
- Mr. Chump (1938) .... Jane Mason
- When Were You Born (1938) .... Nita Kenton√ (Cancer)
- Torchy Blane in Panama (1938) .... Torchy Blane
- Four Wives (1939) .... Thea Lemp Crowley
- Daughters Courageous (1939) .... Linda Masters
- Girls of the Road (1940) .... Elly
- Gangs of Chicago (1940) .... June Whitaker
- Zanzibar (1940) .... Jan Browning
- Convicted Woman (1940) .... Hazel Wren
- Four Mothers (1941) .... Thea Lemp Crowley
- Mystery Ship (1941) .... Patricia Marshall
- Lost Canyon (1942) .... Laura Clark
- Miss V from Moscow (1942) .... Vera Marova, posing as Greta Hiller
- Buckskin Frontier (1943) .... Rita Molyneaux
- Identity Unknown (1945) .... Wanda
- Steppin' in Society (1945) .... The Duchess
- Why Girls Leave Home (1945) .... Irene Mitchell
- Deadline at Dawn (1946) .... Edna Bartelli
- They Made Me a Killer (1946) .... Betty Ford
