= Julius J. Epstein =

American screenwriter (1909–2000)

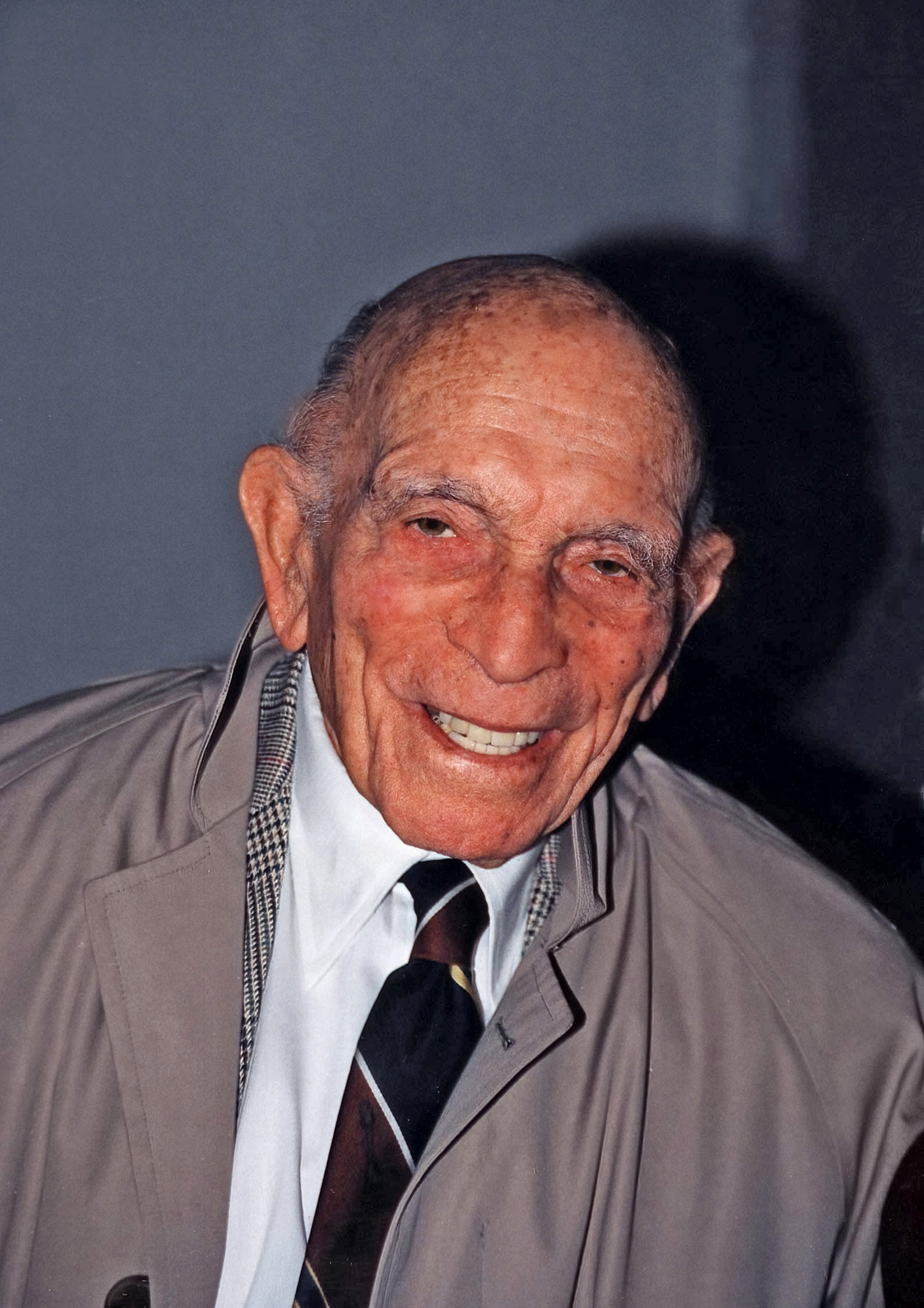
- Epstein in 1997
- Born: August 22, 1909; New York City, New York, U.S.
- Died: December 30, 2000 (aged 91); Los Angeles, California, U.S.
- Occupation: Screenwriter
- Relatives: Philip G. Epstein (twin brother), Leslie Epstein, (nephew); Theo Epstein, (grandnephew)

Julius J. Epstein (August 22, 1909 – December 30, 2000) was an American screenwriter, who had a long career, best remembered for his screenplay, written with his twin brother, Philip, and Howard E. Koch, of the film Casablanca (1942), for which the writers won an Academy Award. It was adapted from an unpublished play, Everybody Comes to Rick's, written by Murray Bennett and Joan Alison.

His identical twin died in 1952, a loss that he felt for the rest of his life. He continued writing, receiving two more Oscar nominations. In 1998, he received a Los Angeles Film Critics Association career achievement award. His credits included Four Daughters (1938) for which he received his first Oscar nomination, The Bride Came C.O.D. (1941), The Man Who Came to Dinner (1942), Mr. Skeffington (1944), The Tender Trap (1955), Light in the Piazza (1962), Send Me No Flowers (1964), Pete 'n' Tillie (1972), Cross of Iron (1977) and Reuben, Reuben (1983).

Epstein had a less successful result as a playwright in Broadway theatre. He adapted his play Front Porch in Flatbush into Saturday Night, the first professional musical written by Stephen Sondheim. The musical was intended to open on Broadway in 1955, but was shelved due to the death of its lead producer. His play, But, Seriously (starring Richard Dreyfuss and Tom Poston) would prove to be the last to be staged at Henry Miller's Theatre for more than 30 years, opening on February 27, 1969, and closing after only four performances.

== Biography ==
Epstein was born Julius Epstein as a twin to his brother Philip to a Jewish family on August 22, 1909, on the Lower East Side of Manhattan in New York City, New York. Their parents owned a livery stable at a time when horses were widely used in the city. He and Philip both graduated from The Pennsylvania State University in 1931, where they were champions in boxing; Julius became an NCAA Bantamweight Champion. He graduated with a BA in Arts and Letters. He maintained close ties with Penn State throughout his life (often as a guest lecturer at the film school). At his request, he was buried in a Penn State polo shirt.

After college, the Epsteins went to Hollywood, hoping to work in the movies. They became successful screenwriters and began collaborating in 1939. They were noted for their Academy Award-winning Casablanca, written together with Howard Koch and the uncredited Casey Robinson.

Jack L. Warner, head of Warner Brothers, had a difficult relationship with the Epstein twins, disliking their pranks and work habits. In 1952, Warner gave their names to the House Un-American Activities Committee (HUAC). They never testified before the committee, but on a HUAC questionnaire, when asked if they ever were members of a "subversive organization," they responded, "Yes. Warner Brothers."

Epstein married the actress Frances Sage and they had two children, James and Elizabeth. They later divorced. Epstein married Ann (1919–2003) and they had a son Philip, who died in 2000.

In 1994, he was interviewed by Walter Matthau.

He died on December 30, 2000, in Los Angeles, California.

== Career ==
Epstein shared an Academy Award nomination for the screenplay of Four Daughters, written with Lenore Coffee (with Thyra Samter Winslow contributing to the treatment and Lawrence Kimble contributing to the script), as an adaptation from Frances Hurst's novel, Sister Act.

In 1944, the Epstein brothers attempted their first film in the capacity of both writers and producers with "Mr. Skeffington." The picture was a box-office success and won both Bette Davis and Claude Rains Oscar nominations. After leaving Warner Bros. in 1948, the Epstein brothers wrote five more screenplays together, two of which, The Last Time I Saw Paris and The Brothers Karamazov, were released after Philip Epstein's death in 1952.

== Notable quote ==
About writing under the studio system of the 1930s and '40s, Epstein said in a 1984 interview:

There wasn't one moment of reality in 'Casablanca.' We weren't making art. We were making a living. Movies in those days were prevented from reality. Every leading man had to be a great sexual athlete. Every boy and girl had to 'meet cute,' and the girl had to dislike the hero when they met. If a woman committed adultery, she had to die. Now the woman who commits adultery is your heroine.

== Works ==
- Four Daughters (1938), for which he received his first Oscar nomination for an adapted screenplay.

Together, he and his brother collaborated on the following:

- The Strawberry Blonde (1941)
- The Bride Came C.O.D. (1941)
- Casablanca (1942)
- The Man Who Came to Dinner (1942)
- Arsenic and Old Lace (1944)
- Mr. Skeffington (1944)
- My Foolish Heart (1949)
- The Last Time I Saw Paris (1954; released 2 years after Philip's death)
- The Brothers Karamazov (1954; released 6 years after Philip's death)

After his brother's death in 1952, Epstein continued to write. His later films include:

- The Tender Trap (1955)
- Light in the Piazza (1962)
- Send Me No Flowers (1964)
- Return from the Ashes (1965)
- Pete 'n' Tillie (1972)
- House Calls (1978)
- Reuben, Reuben (1983)

He wrote screenplays for more than 50 films in his 50-year career.

== Family ==
Epstein has two living children: a daughter, Elizabeth, and a son, James Epstein, who is a criminal lawyer in Los Angeles. Another son, Philip Epstein, died in 2000.

After his twin brother's death, Epstein looked out for Philip's son, Leslie, who became a novelist and director of the creative writing program at Boston University. Epstein was the great-uncle of Leslie's children: Theo Epstein, former Chicago Cubs President of Baseball Operations and former Boston Red Sox general manager, and Anya Epstein, a television writer.

== Legacy and honors ==
- 1939: Nomination for Academy Award for his adapted screenplay for Four Daughters, adapted from Fannie Hurst's novel, Sister Act.
- 1944: Academy Award for Best Adapted Screenplay for Casablanca, adapted from an unproduced play, Rick's Cafe
- 1973: Nomination for Academy Award for his adapted screenplay for Pete 'n' Tillie, adapted from two novels by Peter De Vries.
- 1984: Nomination for Academy Award and a Writers Guild of America Award for screenplay of Reuben, Reuben, based on a De Vries novel.
- 1998: Los Angeles Film Critics Association career achievement award.
