= About Face (1952 film) =

1952 film by Roy Del Ruth

- Directed by: Roy Del Ruth
- Screenplay by: Peter Milne
- Based on: Brother Rat; 1936 play by John Monks Jr. Fred F. Finklehoffe
- Produced by: William Jacobs
- Starring: Gordon MacRae; Eddie Bracken; Virginia Gibson
- Cinematography: Bert Glennon
- Edited by: Thomas Reilly
- Music by: Ray Heindorf
- Production company: Warner Bros. Pictures
- Distributed by: Warner Bros. Pictures
- Release dates: February 28, 1952 (Nashville); May 23, 1952 (New York)
- Running time: 94 minutes
- Country: United States
- Language: English
- Box office: $1.6 million (U.S.)

About Face is a 1952 American Warner Bros. Pictures musical comedy film directed by Roy Del Ruth and starring Gordon MacRae, Eddie Bracken and Virginia Gibson. Future Oscar winner Joel Grey appears in his film debut. The film is an adaptation of the 1936 play Brother Rat written by John Monks Jr. and Fred F. Finklehoffe and a remake of the 1938 film of the same title.

== Plot ==
Three friends enlist at a military academy in the American South. While two of them pursue romantic entanglements, the third tries hide that he is secretly married and expecting a child.

== Cast ==
- Gordon MacRae as Tony Williams
- Eddie Bracken as Biff Roberts
- Dick Wesson as Dave Crouse
- Virginia Gibson as Betty Long
- Phyllis Kirk as Alice Wheatley
- Aileen Stanley Jr. as Lorna Carter
- Joel Grey as Bender
- Larry Keating as Colonel Long
- Cliff Ferre as Lieut. Jones
- John Baer as Hal Carlton
- Mabel Albertson as Mrs. Carter
- James Best as Joe
- Ferris Taylor as Doctor

== Release ==
The world premiere of About Face was held in Nashville, Tennessee on February 28, 1952 to open the new Tennessee Theatre, with most of the film's stars in attendance.

== Reception ==
In a contemporary review for The New York Times, critic Howard Thompson wrote: "The rowdy spontaneity of the original is completely lost in a stale script by Peter Milne, overstuffed with inane dialogue and feeble gags. Under the direction of Roy Del Ruth, 'About Face' marches along at a snail's pace ... And instead of lubricating the continuity, the musical portion almost smothers it. ... Dull though the film may be, it is both clean and pretty."

The film was a box-office failure. Bracken later said that "the main reason why audiences rejected About Face, I think, is that most of us were too damn old for the roles."
