= Jessie Busley =

American actress and comedian (1869–1950)

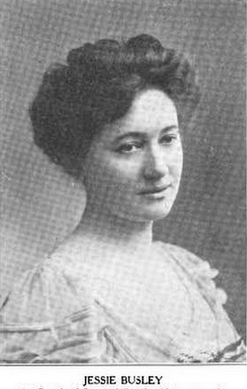
Jessie Busley, from a 1909 publication.

Jessie Busley (1869–1950) was an American actress and comedian who performed on stage, screen, and radio for over six decades.

== Early years ==
Busley was born on March 10, 1869, in Albany, New York. The wife of an Albany theater owner took her to New York, where she met Charles Frohman.

== Career ==
Busley's first Broadway appearance came in 1888. She starred on stage in over 25 Frohman productions in the first 15 years of her career. In June 1930, she appeared on film for the first time in The Devil's Parade A Musical Revue set in Hades, a 10-minute film short by Warner Bros. Pictures, alongside actress Joan Blondell.

Busley went on to appear in such films as Brother Rat and Brother Rat and a Baby. In 1939, she appeared alongside Kay Francis, James Stephenson, and Humphrey Bogart in King of the Underworld. The next year she appeared in Humphrey Bogart's It All Came True.

== Personal life and death ==
Several months after they were married, Ernest Joy tried to shoot a theatrical press agent in a jealous rage after he saw him leaving a theater with Busley. Word of the shot was reported in the news of the time and the press agent left town. Later that same year, Busley and Joy separated after it was reported that she had him arrested for "annoying her". All charges were dropped when she did not testify against him.

On August 1, 1908, The New York Times reported that Busley had sent two men to beat her husband Joy, whom she intended to divorce, with one of them hitting him over the head with an iron bar, leaving him hospitalized. The article said that the couple had frequent quarrels, and finished by noting that she had last appeared in The Bishop's Carriage, and "is well known as an actress but has had more success in the south and west then [sic] in this city".

Busley died on April 20, 1950, in St. Vincent's Hospital in New York City, aged 80.

== Stage roles ==
- +Not on Broadway
- Aug 25, 1895- : The Sporting Duchess, Academy of Music, 212 performances :Daly's Theatre
- Nov 27, 1899 - Feb 4, 1900: The Manoeuvres of Jane [Original, Play, Comedy] :Garden Theatre
- Feb 21, 1900 - May 1900: Hearts Are Trumps [Original, Play, Melodrama] :The National Theatre :+(Washington, DC)
- October 22–27, 1900: Hearts Are Trumps [Original, Play, Melodrama] :[Herald Square Theatre]
- May 20, 1901 - Jul 8, 1901: The Brixton Burglary [Original, Play, Farce] :Criterion Theatre
- Aug 26, 1901 - Dec 1901: A Royal Rival [Original, Play, Drama] :Garrick Theatre
- Mar 17, 1902 - Apr 1902: Sky Farm [Original, Play, Comedy] :Garrick Theatre
- Aug 25, 1902 - Sep 1902: The New Clown [Original, Play, Farce] :Hoyt's Theatre
- Sep 30, 1902 - Nov 1902: The Two Schools [Original, Play] :Empire Theatre
- Jan 5, 1904 - Jan 1904: Little Mary [Original, Play] :Savoy Theatre, (1/11/1905 - 1/29/1905) :Lyceum Theatre, (1/30/1905 - 4/30/1905)
- Jan 11, 1905 - Apr 30, 1905: Mrs. Leffingwell's Boots [Original, Play, Comedy] :Grand Opera House
- Feb 25, 1907 - Mar 1907: In the Bishop's Carriage [Original, Play] :New Theatre
- Nov 11, 1909 - [unknown]: The Cottage in the Air [Original, Play] :New Theatre
- Jan 3, 1910 - Jan 3, 1910: Liz the Mother [Original, Play] :New Theatre
- Mar 28, 1910 - [unknown]: The Winter's Tale [Revival, Play, Comedy] :New Theatre
- Dec 19, 1910 - [unknown]: Old Heidelberg [Revival, Play] :Liberty Theatre
- Nov 23, 1914 - Nov 1914: Twelfth Night [Revival, Play, Comedy] :Hudson Theatre
- Sep 18, 1916 - Dec 1916: Pollyanna [Original, Play] :Playhouse Theatre
- Oct 15, 1919 - Oct 1919: A Young Man's Fancy [Original, Play, Comedy] :Playhouse Theatre
- Oct 25, 1926 - Jan 1927: Daisy Mayme [Original, Play, Comedy] :[Daisy Mayme Plunkett] :Lyceum Theatre
- Dec 28, 1928 - Jan 1929: To-Morrow [Original, Play] :[Grace] :Broadhurst Theatre
- Nov 19, 1930 - Dec 1930: An Affair of State [Original, Play, Comedy] :[Aunt Augusta] :48th Street Theatre
- Oct 6, 1931 - Dec 1931: The Streets of New York, or Poverty is No Crime [Revival, Play, Melodrama] :[Mrs. Puffy] :48th Street Theatre
- Oct 14, 1931 - Oct 1931: Pillars of Society [Revival, Play, Drama] :[Miss Rummel] :Fulton Theatre
- Dec 26, 1931 - Mar 1932: The Bride the Sun Shines On [Original, Play, Comedy] :[Mrs. Marbury] :Belasco Theatre
- Feb 20, 1933 - May 1933: Alien Corn [Original, Play] :[Mrs. Skeats] :Center Theatre
- Sep 22, 1934 - Jun 8, 1935: The Great Waltz [Original, Musical, Operetta] :[Greta] :Center Theatre
- Aug 5, 1935 - Sep 16, 1935: The Great Waltz [Original, Musical, Operetta] :[Greta] :Music Box Theatre
- Nov 26, 1935 - Jun 1936: First Lady [Original, Play, Comedy] :[Belle Hardwick] :Ethel Barrymore Theatre
- Dec 26, 1936 - Jul 1938: The Women [Original, Play, Comedy] :[Mrs. Morehead] :Music Box Theatre
- Jan 3, 1944 - Jul 8, 1944: Over 21 [Original, Play] :[Mrs. Armina Gates] :John Golden Theatre
- Nov 9, 1945 - Dec 1, 1945: The Rich Full Life [Original, Play] :[Mother Fenwick] :Lyceum Theatre
- Apr 25, 1949 - Apr 30, 1949: The Happiest Years [Original, Play, Comedy] :[Alida Wentworth]

=== Films ===
This filmography is believed to be complete.

- The Devil's Parade (1930 short)
- Personal Maid (1931)
- Brother Rat (1938)
- King of the Underworld (1939) as Aunt Josephine
- Brother Rat and a Baby (1940)
- It All Came True (1940) as Mrs. Nora Taylor
- Escape to Glory (1940)
