= Brother Rat and a Baby =

1940 film by Ray Enright

- Theatrical release poster
- Directed by: Ray Enright
- Screenplay by: John Cherry Monks, Jr. Fred F. Finklehoffe; Jerry Wald; Richard Macaulay
- Produced by: Hal B. Wallis
- Starring: Priscilla Lane; Wayne Morris; Eddie Albert; Jane Wyman; Ronald Reagan
- Cinematography: Charles Rosher
- Edited by: Clarence Kolster
- Music by: Heinz Roemheld
- Production company: Warner Bros. Pictures
- Distributed by: Warner Bros. Pictures
- Release date: January 13, 1940
- Running time: 87 minutes
- Country: United States
- Language: English

Brother Rat and a Baby is a 1940 American comedy film directed by Ray Enright and written by John Cherry Monks, Jr. and Fred F. Finklehoffe. It is the sequel to the 1938 film Brother Rat. The film stars Priscilla Lane, Wayne Morris, Jane Bryan in her final role, Eddie Albert, Jane Wyman, and Ronald Reagan. The film was released by Warner Bros. Pictures on January 13, 1940.

== Plot ==
Cadets Dan Crawford (Ronald Reagan), Billy Randolph (Wayne Morris) and Bing Edwards (Eddie Albert) have graduated from the Virginia Military Institute. In commemoration of this accomplishment, Bing and his loving wife, Kate (Jane Bryan), name their first-born child Commencement. But, despite the enthusiasm of the graduates, they soon discover that life after school is trickier than they expected—especially with a trouble-making baby that goes missing.

== Cast ==
- Priscilla Lane as Joyce Winfree
- Wayne Morris as Billy Randolph
- Jane Bryan as Kate
- Eddie Albert as 'Bing' Edwards
- Jane Wyman as Claire Terry
- Ronald Reagan as Dan Crawford
- Peter B. Good as Commencement
- Arthur Treacher as Snelling
- Moroni Olsen as Major Terry
- Jessie Busley as Mrs. Brooks
- Larry Williams as Harley Harrington
- Berton Churchill as Mr. Harper
- Nana Bryant as Mrs. Harper
- Paul Harvey as Sterling Randolph
- Mayo Methot as Girl in Bus
- Edward Gargan as Cab Driver
