= Escape to Glory =

- Theatrical release poster
- Directed by: John Brahm
- Written by: Sidney Biddell; Fredric M. Frank; Pincus J. Wolfson
- Produced by: Samuel Bischoff
- Starring: Pat O'Brien; Constance Bennett
- Cinematography: Franz Planer
- Edited by: Al Clark
- Music by: Sydney Cutner (uncredited); Werner R. Heymann (uncredited)
- Production company: Columbia Pictures
- Distributed by: Columbia Pictures
- Release date: May 20, 1940
- Running time: 64 mins.
- Country: United States
- Language: English

Escape to Glory is a 1940 American war film directed by John Brahm. It stars Pat O'Brien and Constance Bennett. During World War II, a British freighter carrying a diverse group of passengers is attacked by a German U-boat.

A review in The New York Times said, "... despite a touch of heavy heroics, it bangs out a lively adventure yarn".

== Cast ==
- Pat O'Brien as Mike Farrough
- Constance Bennett as Christine Blaine
- John Halliday as John Morgan
- Alan Baxter as Larry Perrin, alias Larry Ross
- Erwin Kalser as Dr. Adolph Behrens
- Edgar Buchanan as Charles Atterbee
- Frank Sully as Tommy Malone
- Marjorie Gateson as Mrs. Winslow
- Francis Pierlot as Professor Mudge
- Jessie Busley as Mrs. Mudge
- Melville Cooper as Ship's Mate Penney
- Stanley Logan as Captain James P. Hollister
