= Fun on a Weekend =

1947 film by Andrew L. Stone

- Theatrical release poster
- Directed by: Andrew L. Stone
- Screenplay by: Andrew L. Stone
- Produced by: Andrew L. Stone
- Starring: Eddie Bracken; Priscilla Lane; Tom Conway; Allen Jenkins; Arthur Treacher; Clarence Kolb; Fritz Feld
- Cinematography: Paul Ivano
- Edited by: Paul Weatherwax
- Music by: Lucien Cailliet
- Production company: Andrew L. Stone Productions
- Distributed by: United Artists
- Release date: May 15, 1947
- Running time: 93 minutes
- Country: United States
- Language: English

Fun on a Weekend is a 1947 American comedy film written and directed by Andrew L. Stone. The film stars Eddie Bracken, Priscilla Lane, Tom Conway, Allen Jenkins, Arthur Treacher, Clarence Kolb and Fritz Feld. The film was released on May 15, 1947, by United Artists.

== Plot ==
Pete and Nancy, both destitute, find that they have been sleeping on the same Florida beach, and decide to work together to make some money. While at a beachfront cafe trying to get the most from their pooled resources, 15 cents, much to the frustration of the cafe's owner, they vow to be staying at the ritzy nearby Villa Riviera hotel by that night. Calling themselves Mr and Mrs Peterson Price Porterhouse III, they inveigle their way into the local smart set.

== Cast ==
- Eddie Bracken as Pete Porter
- Priscilla Lane as Nancy Crane
- Tom Conway as Jefferson Van Orsdale Jr.
- Allen Jenkins as Joe Morgan
- Arthur Treacher as Benjamin O. Moffatt
- Clarence Kolb as Quigley Quackenbush
- Fritz Feld as Sergei Stroganoff
- Alma Kruger as Mrs. Van Orsdale
- Russell Hicks as John Biddle
- Richard Hageman as Cyrus Cowperwaithe
- Lester Allen as Hot Dog Vendor
