= Eloise Taylor =

American actress

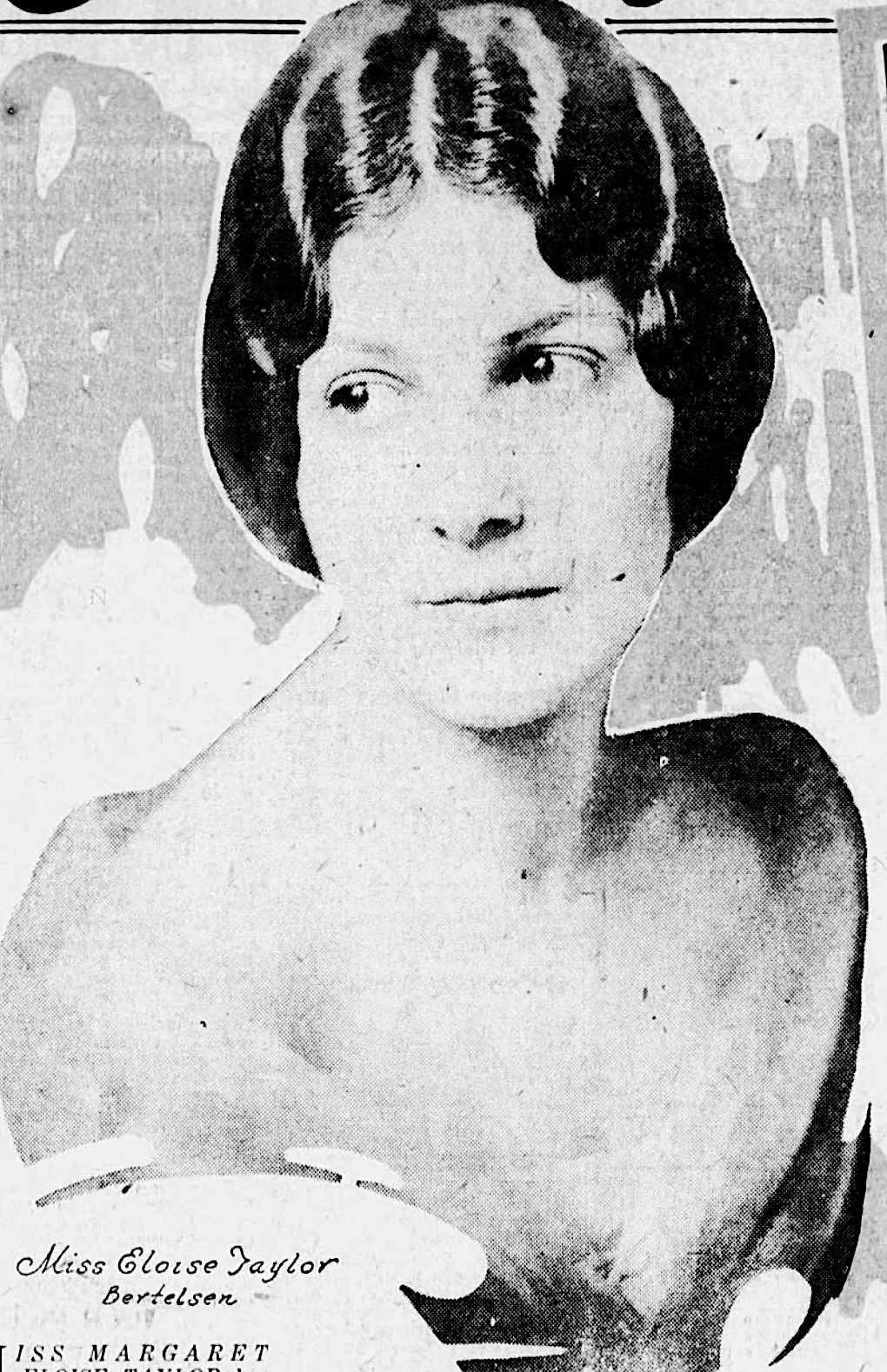
Eloise Taylor in 1925.

Eloise Taylor, also known by her married name Eloise Taylor O'Brien, (February 3, 1903 – December 16, 1987) was an American actress active on stage and screen. She had lead roles in the films The Convict's Code (1930) and Damaged Love (1931). She was married to actor Pat O'Brien, and took a long absence from the stage to raise their four children. She resumed performing in the 1960s and 1970s; often working with her husband in dinner theatre. Her other screen credits include the role of Mrs. Thaw in Ragtime and Judge Arline Brandon in the television series Harrigan and Son.

== Early life ==
The daughter of Carl C. Taylow and Margaret A. Taylor (nee Boud), Margaret Eloise Taylor was born in Iowa on February 3, 1903. She attended Polk School in Cedar Rapids, Iowa where she starred as Ellen Douglass in a school production of Walter Scott's The Lady of the Lake when she was in the eighth grade. She moved from Cedar Rapids to Des Moines, Iowa in July 1918. There she attended North High School (NHS) where she starred as Miss Deer Foot in NHS's 1920 production of Will C. Macfarlane's operetta Little Almond Eyes. She graduated from NHS.

Taylor won a 1923 beauty contest in Des Moines that was judged by actor Rudolph Valentino. At that time she was employed in the office of the Iowa Attorney General Ben Gibson as a stenographer. The competition win came with an all expenses paid trip to New York City where she was given a screen test for a film career. She also visited the White House on this trip and met president Calvin Coolidge. In 1924 she performed with the Princess Players in Des Moines in a production of George M. Cohan's Mary. On December 28, 1925 she married her first husband, Don F Williams. She remained active in amateur dramatics in Des Moines after her marriage; including portraying Laura Pennington in a community theatre production of The Enchanted Cottage in 1927. Her marriage to Williams ended in divorce in March 1929.

== Career ==
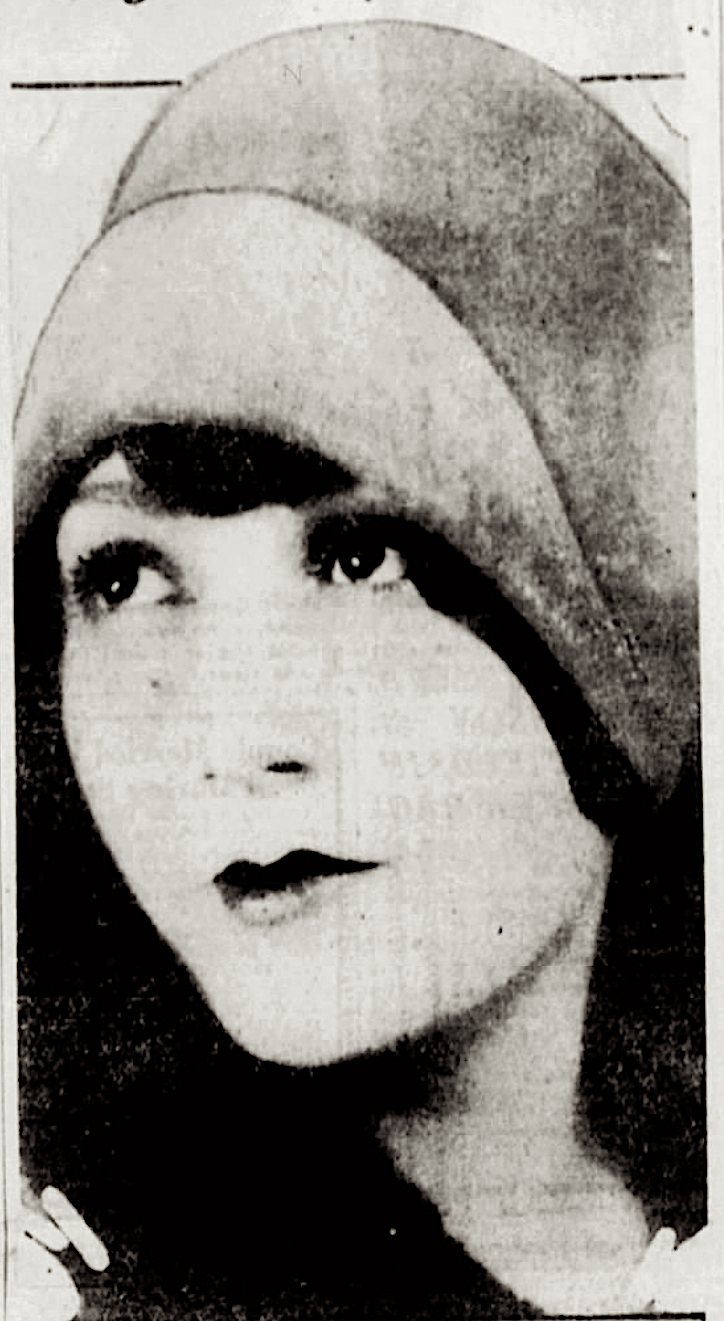
Eloise Taylor in 1929.

Taylor began her professional career performing in stock theatre in the summer of 1927 in Saranac Lake, New York with the Adirondack Stock Company. After this she worked as an understudy for the Broadway production of George Abbott and Philip Dunning's Broadway at the Broadhurst Theatre, and in the same capacity for this show's run in Chicago at the Selwyn Theater. She took over the part of Grace in the national touring production of this show in 1928. In 1929 she performed in stock theatre in Iowa prior to be offered a contract as a film actress.

Taylor starred as Nan Perry in The Convict's Code (1930) which was Cullen Landis's last film. She portrayed Rose Powell in Damaged Love (1931) which was released by World Wide Pictures and directed by Irvin Willat. She put her acting career on a lengthy hold after marrying Pat O'Brien in 1931. She raised their four children, and then resumed performing in the 1960s. In 1961 she guest starred on the television series Harrigan and Son in the episode "My Fair Lawyer" in which she portrayed Judge Arline Brandon. She portrayed Mrs. Thaw in the 1981 film Ragtime. She was highly active as a lead actress in dinner theatre productions (often with her husband) during the 1960s and 1970s.

Taylor died in Santa Monica, California on December 16, 1987.
