= Tony Reading =

British art director

- Occupation: Art director
- Years active: 1961-2006

Tony Reading was a British art director. He was nominated for an Academy Award in the category Best Art Direction for the film Ragtime.

== Selected filmography ==
- Ragtime (1981)
