= Cowboy from Brooklyn =

1938 film by Lloyd Bacon

- Warner's promotional poster
- Directed by: Lloyd Bacon
- Written by: Earl Baldwin
- Starring: Dick Powell; Pat O'Brien; Priscilla Lane
- Cinematography: Arthur Edeson
- Edited by: James Gibbon
- Music by: Adolph Deutsch
- Production company: Cosmopolitan Productions
- Distributed by: Warner Bros. Pictures
- Release date: July 9, 1938
- Running time: 77 min.
- Country: United States
- Language: English

Cowboy from Brooklyn is a 1938 American Western musical romantic comedy film directed by Lloyd Bacon and written by Earl Baldwin. It stars Dick Powell, Pat O'Brien and Priscilla Lane. The film was based on the 1937 Broadway play Howdy Stranger by Robert Sloane and Louis Pelletier.

== Plot ==
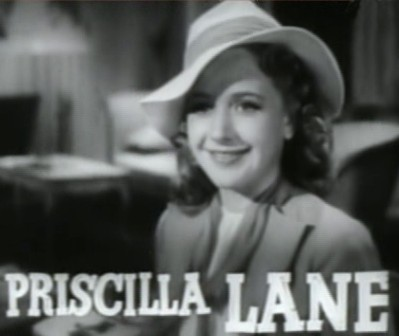
Priscilla Lane, the youngest of the Lane Sisters, in the trailer for the film.

Singer Elly Jordan, a Brooklyn man who is terrified of animals, ends up broke along with his two musical partners at Hardy's Dude Ranch in Two Bits, Wyoming. The Hardys, Ma and Pop, daughter Jane and son Jeff, hire the men to play for the dudes. Sam Thorne, Jane's self-appointed boyfriend, ranch cowhand and amateur crooner, is jealous of Jane's interest in Elly. Elly is so successful as a cowboy singer, that when theatrical agent Roy Chadwick arrives at the ranch on a vacation and hears him, he signs Elly immediately. Chadwick thinks that Elly is a real cowboy and Jane coaches him to talk like one. In spite of his fear of animals, he gets away with the deception. He makes a successful screen test as a cowboy, using the name Wyoming Steve Gibson, but he and Chadwick, who now knows the truth, fear that the deception will be revealed when the movie people arrive in New York from Hollywood with Elly's contract.

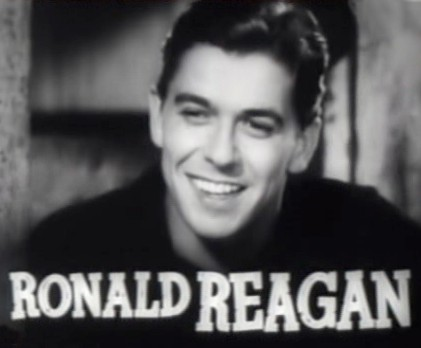
From the trailer.

Meanwhile, Jane and some of the ranch people are traveling East as well so Sam can sing on Captain Rose's Amateur Hour in New York. Jane tells Sam that she is in love with Elly and Sam is so angry that when he isn't a big success on the show, he blurts out the truth about Elly's background. To prove that Elly is on the level, Chadwick and his assistant Pat Dunn suggest that he compete in a rodeo. They take Elly to Professor Landis, who hypnotizes him. Under hypnosis, Elly leaps on a horse, rides to Madison Square Garden, enters the bulldogging contest and sets a new record. He sneezes and wakes from the hypnosis, but the movie people are convinced that he is a real cowboy. He signs the contract and kisses Jane to seal the deal.

== Cast ==
- Dick Powell as Elly Jordan aka Wyoming Steve Gibson
- Pat O'Brien as Roy Chadwick
- Priscilla Lane as Jane Hardy
- Dick Foran as Sam Thorne
- Ann Sheridan as Maxine Chadwick
- Johnnie Davis as Jeff Hardy
- Ronald Reagan as Pat (Pete) Dunn
- Emma Dunn as Ma Hardy
- Granville Bates as Pop Hardy
- James Stephenson as Prof. Landis
- Hobart Cavanaugh as Mr. 'Pops' Jordan
- Elisabeth Risdon as Mrs. Jordan
- Dennie Moore as Abby Pitts
- Rosella Towne as Panthea Landis
- Mary Field as Myrtle Semple

== List of songs ==
- I Got a Heartful of Sunshine – Candy Candido
- Git Along Little Doggie – Johnnie Davis and Dick Powell
- Ride, Tenderfoot, Ride – Priscilla Lane with Dick Powell
- I'll Dream Tonight – Dick Powell
- Howdy, Stranger – Dick Powell
