= Pat O'Brien (actor) =

American actor (1899–1983)

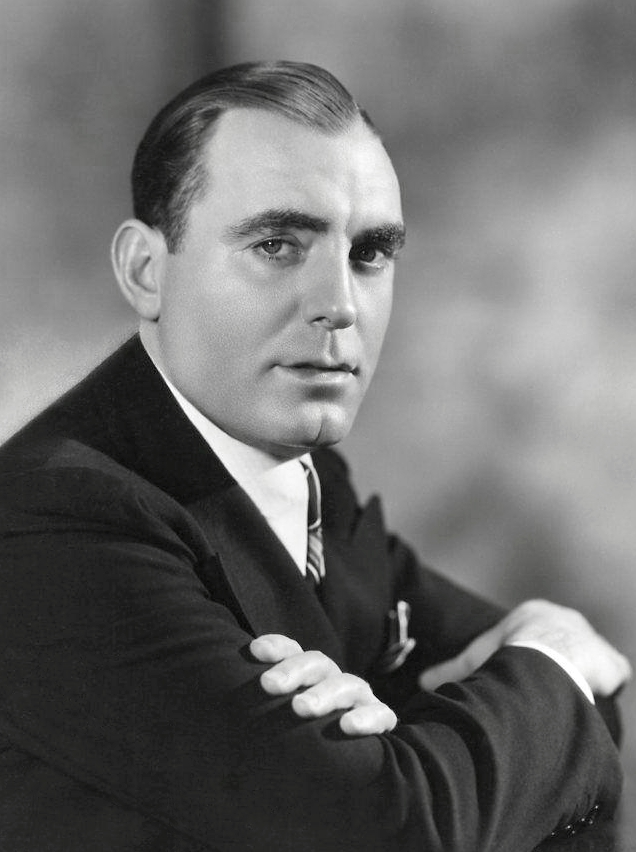
- O'Brien in 1936
- Born: William Joseph Patrick O'Brien; November 11, 1899; Milwaukee, Wisconsin, U.S.
- Died: October 15, 1983 (aged 83); Santa Monica, California, U.S.
- Occupation: Actor
- Years active: 1925–1983
- Spouse: Eloise Taylor (m. 1931)
- Children: 4

William Joseph Patrick O'Brien (November 11, 1899 – October 15, 1983) was an American film actor with more than 100 screen credits. Of Irish descent, he often played Irish and Irish-American characters and was referred to as "Hollywood's Irishman in Residence" in the press. One of the best-known screen actors of the 1930s and 1940s, he played priests, cops, military figures, pilots, and reporters. He is especially well-remembered for his roles in Knute Rockne, All American (1940), Angels with Dirty Faces (1938), and Some Like It Hot (1959). He was frequently paired onscreen with Hollywood star and close friend James Cagney. O'Brien also appeared on stage and television.

== Early life ==
O'Brien was born in 1899 to an Irish-American Catholic family in Milwaukee, Wisconsin. All four of his grandparents had come from Ireland. The O'Briens were originally from County Cork. His grandfather, Patrick O'Brien, for whom he was named, was an architect who was killed while trying to break up a saloon fight in New York City. His mother's parents, the McGoverns, emigrated from County Galway in the west of Ireland in the mid- to late-19th century.

As a child, O'Brien served as an altar boy at Gesu Church, while growing up near 13th and Kilbourn Streets in Milwaukee. He attended Marquette Academy with fellow actor Spencer Tracy, who was a lifelong friend. During World War I, O'Brien and Tracy joined the United States Navy. They both attended boot camp at the Great Lakes Naval Training Center, but they never went to sea. The war ended before their training had finished.

Jack Benny was also at the Great Lakes Naval Training Center at the same time as O'Brien and Tracy. According to his autobiography, Benny performed a number on the violin at a show one evening, when the sailors started booing and heckling him. O'Brien walked on stage and whispered in his ear, "For heaven's sake, Ben, put down the damn fiddle and talk to 'em." Benny stopped playing his violin and made a series of comments that got laughs from the audience. In this way, O'Brien indirectly helped to start Benny's career in comedy.

After the war, O'Brien finished his secondary schooling at Marquette Academy and later attended Marquette University. While still at college, he decided to seek work as an actor. He and Spencer Tracy moved to New York, where they both attended the American Academy of Dramatic Arts. The two struggling young actors shared a small studio apartment, and began their careers on the stage.

== Early career ==
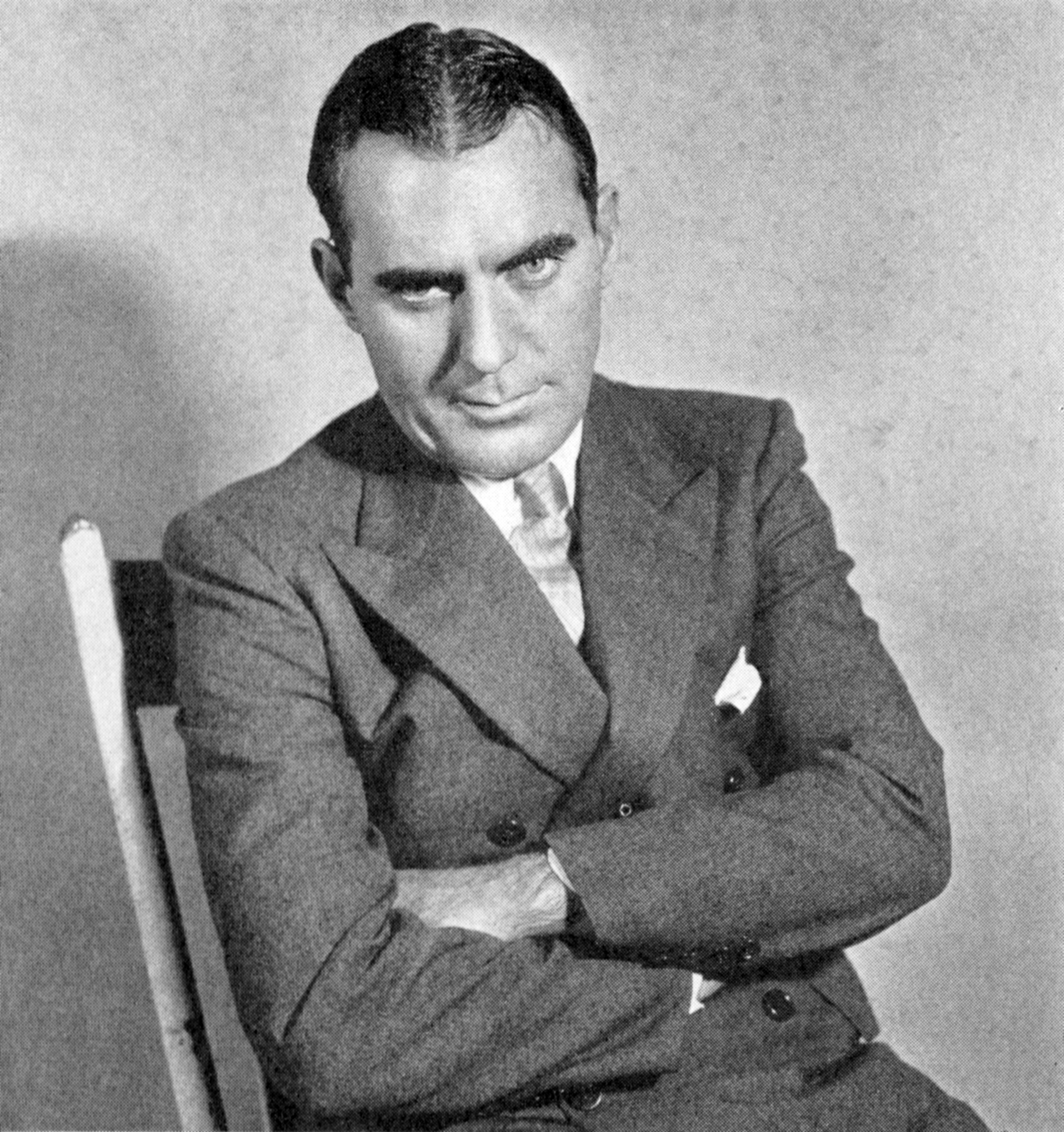
Pat O'Brien in 1931

O'Brien spent a decade in plays on Broadway and in the New York City area.

O'Brien made his film debut in the Vitaphone Varieties short film, The Nightingale, produced in New York and released in August 1930. His first starring role was as ace reporter Hildy Johnson in the original 1931 version of The Front Page with Adolphe Menjou. In 2010, this film was selected by the National Film Preservation Board for preservation in the Library of Congress's National Film Registry as being "culturally, historically, or aesthetically significant."

He was the lead in Paramount's Personal Maid (1931), and appeared in a Metro-Goldwyn-Mayer musical Flying High (1931), supporting Bert Lahr. He was Irene Dunne's love interest in RKO's Consolation Marriage (1932), then co-starred opposite a young Bette Davis in Hell's House (1932). O'Brien stayed in leads, going from studio to studio: Scandal for Sale (1932), at Universal; The Strange Case of Clara Deane (1932), at Paramount; Hollywood Speaks (1932), American Madness (1932) and Virtue (1932).

O'Brien played a heroic pilot in Universal's Air Mail (1932), directed by John Ford. While at that studio he was in the compelling Laughter in Hell (1932) and Destination Unknown (1933). At the small Majestic Pictures he starred in The World Gone Mad (1933).

=== Warner Bros ===
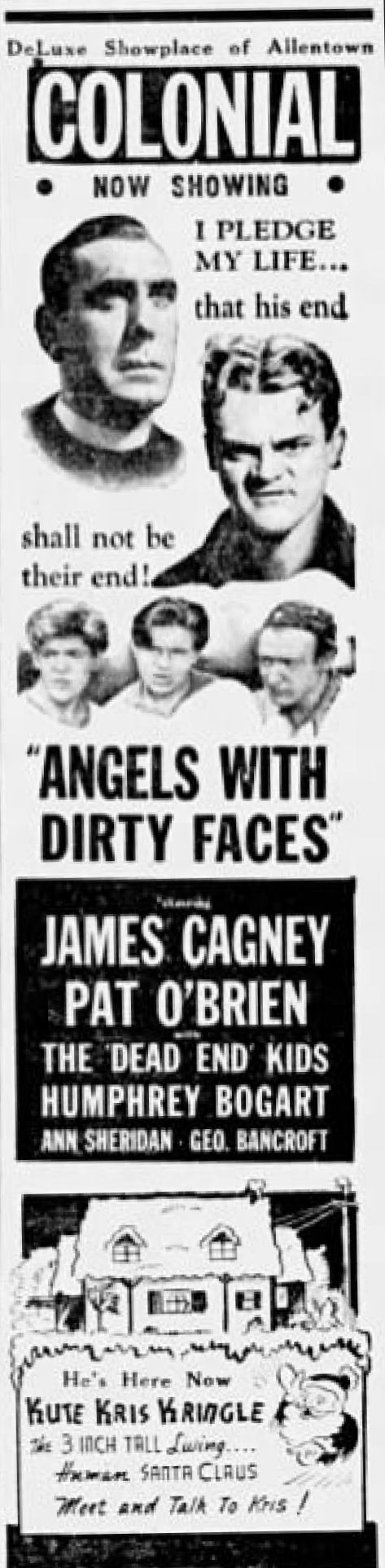
Newspaper ad in 1939

O'Brien's first Warner Bros. movie was Bureau of Missing Persons (1933), starring Bette Davis. He went to RKO for Flaming Gold (1933) and MGM for Bombshell (1933), then Warners signed O'Brien to a long-term contract. He would remain with the studio until 1940, when he left after a dispute over the terms of his contract renewal.

O'Brien supported Dick Powell in College Coach (1933) and Joan Blondell in I've Got Your Number (1934). He was third lead to Barbara Stanwyck and Joel McCrea in Gambling Lady (1934), then was with Powell again in Twenty Million Sweethearts (1934).

Here Comes the Navy (1934) was O'Brien's first film with James Cagney, also under contract to Warners. The two originally met in 1926 and remained friends for almost six decades. After O'Brien's death, Cagney referred to him as his "dearest friend." O'Brien played the lead, a boxer, in The Personality Kid (1934), supported Powell in Flirtation Walk (1934) and was an auctioneer in I Sell Anything (1935).

Cagney and O'Brien were reteamed in Devil Dogs of the Air (1935). He was a critic in love with Dolores del Río in In Caliente (1935) and had the lead in the bio-pic Oil for the Lamps of China (1935), which he called "one of my favorite pictures." "That was a sweetheart," he said.

He and Cagney were in The Irish in Us (1935) then it was back to supporting Powell in Page Miss Glory (1935). He headlined a musical Stars Over Broadway (1935) then was back with Cagney for Howard Hawks' Ceiling Zero (1935). Cagney later sued Warners for billing O'Brien's name above his.

"Jimmy's grand to work with," said O'Brien in 1935. "You couldn't ask for a better partner but there's a limit to all that. I think one picture a year with Jimmy would be fine. But as it is I've been with him in every uniform – the army, the navy, the police, the marines, the air corps – and it's always a case of me falling for his girl or him falling for mine. It gets tiresome... I don't just want to be a fast-talking Charlie all my life."

Warners gave him some starring parts: I Married a Doctor (1936), Public Enemy's Wife (1936), China Clipper (1936), The Great O'Malley (1937), and Slim (1937) with Henry Fonda. He was Captain of the Guard (on special leave from the US Army) in San Quentin (1937) opposite Humphrey Bogart, romanced Blondell in Back in Circulation (1937) and was a veteran sailor in Submarine D-1 (1938).

O'Brien was pulled out of Swing Your Lady to co-star with Kay Francis in Women Are Like That (1938) and was back with Powell for Cowboy from Brooklyn (1938). He and Cagney reteamed for Boy Meets Girl (1938), and he was meant to be back with Powell in Garden of the Moon (1938), but Powell refused to do it – he was replaced by John Payne.

O'Brien had one of his best ever roles as the former street kid turned priest in Angels with Dirty Faces (1938) with Cagney. He was with Blondell in Off the Record (1939) and The Kid from Kokomo (1939), and co-starred with Gale Page in Indianapolis Speedway (1939).

He went over to Paramount for The Night of Nights (1939), part of a deal in which Warners bought the rights to The Old Maid from Paramount. He then made Slightly Honorable (1939) for United Artists.

Back at Warner Bros he was reunited with Cagney for The Fighting 69th (1940) then made Castle on the Hudson (1940) with Sheridan and John Garfield. He was a cop in 'Til We Meet Again (1940), with Cagney and Sheridan in Torrid Zone (1940). He co-starred with Garfield and Frances Farmer in Flowing Gold (1940).

O'Brien was then given his best known role, as the famous University of Notre Dame football coach Knute Rockne in Knute Rockne, All American (1940). In the film, he gave the speech to "win just one for the Gipper," referring to recently deceased football player, George Gipp, portrayed in the film by a young Ronald Reagan. Reagan later used this saying as a slogan for his campaign for president in 1980.

O'Brien was at a career peak. He was considered for the role of Alvin York in the film Sergeant York. From this high point, however, O'Brien left Warner Bros in July 1940.

=== Leaving Warner Bros ===
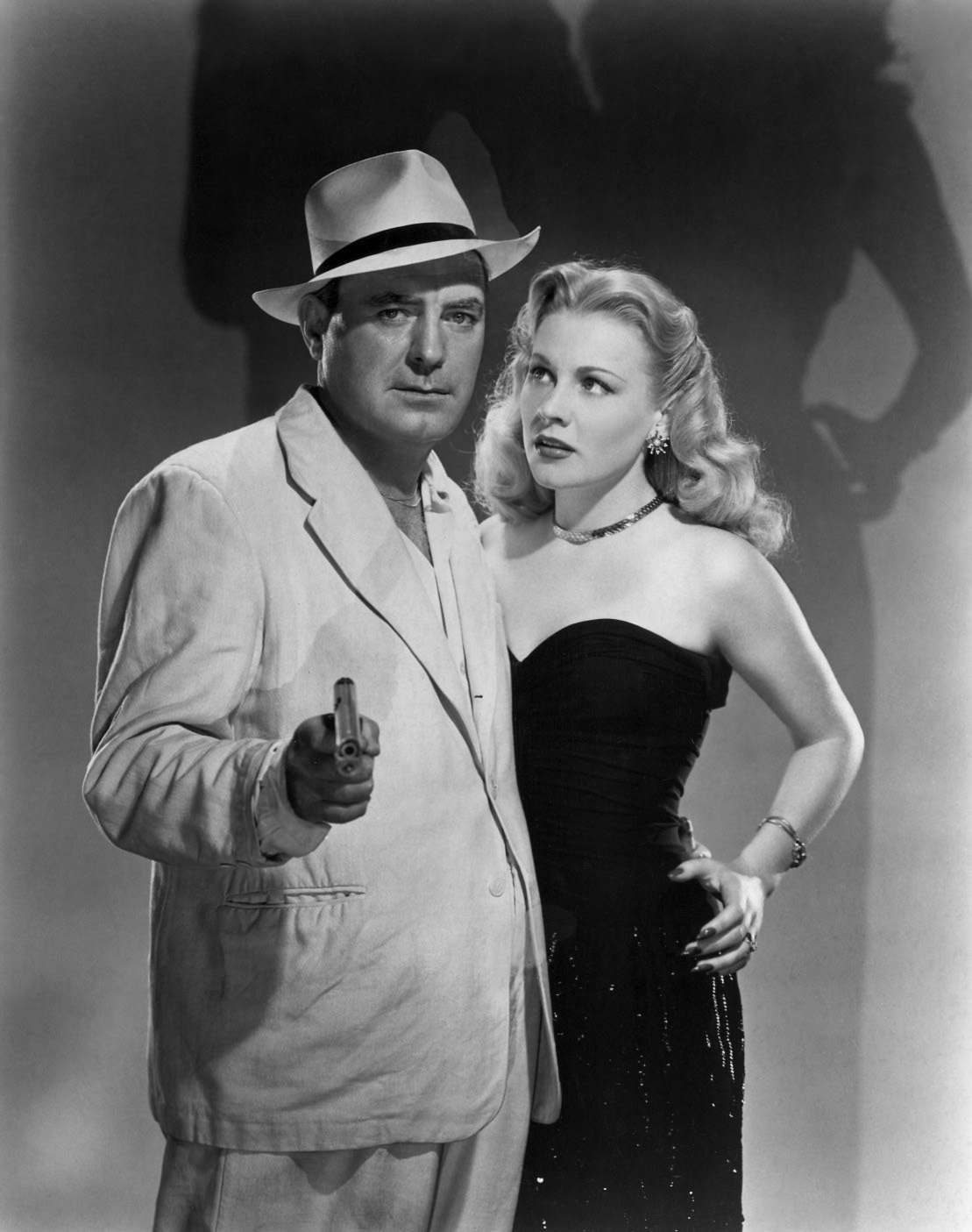
O'Brien and Anne Jeffreys in Riffraff (1947)

After he left Warner Bros. in 1940, O'Brien signed a contract with 20th Century Fox for two films a year. However they ended up not using him.

He signed with Columbia Pictures to make two films a year. He was in Escape to Glory (1940), then was idle for a year before making Two Yanks in Trinidad (1942) with Brian Donlevy and Flight Lieutenant (1942) with Glenn Ford. At Universal he was in Broadway (1942) with George Raft.

=== RKO ===
Soon he signed a contract with RKO and appeared in several movies for that studio. He mostly played authority/military roles such as The Navy Comes Through (1942), and Bombardier (1943). The Iron Major (1943) was an attempt to repeat the success of Knute Rockne with O'Brien as Frank Cavanaugh. At Universal he supported Deanna Durbin in Frank Borzage's His Butler's Sister (1943) then it was back to RKO for Marine Raiders (1944).

With his agent Phil Ryan, O'Brien set up his own production company, Teneen Productions. They signed a deal with Columbia to make a film with O'Brien, Secret Command (1944). (In 1955 the IRS would sue him for earnings on this film.) At RKO he did Having Wonderful Crime (1946) and Man Alive (1945). For Columbia he made Perilous Holiday (1946).

In 1946 he starred in the successful film noir suspense film, Crack-Up. He was in a thriller, Riffraff (1947) and another biopic Fighting Father Dunne (1948). He followed it with The Boy with Green Hair (1948), and A Dangerous Profession (1949) with Raft.

While working as a Hollywood contract player, O'Brien made occasional appearances on the radio in the 1930s and 1940s. In 1946 he collaborated with the contralto Kate Smith on the popular Viva America program for the CBS radio network. In the summer of 1947, he starred with Lynn Bari in Summer Theater, a program "dramatizing episodes in the life of a small town druggist."

== Later career ==
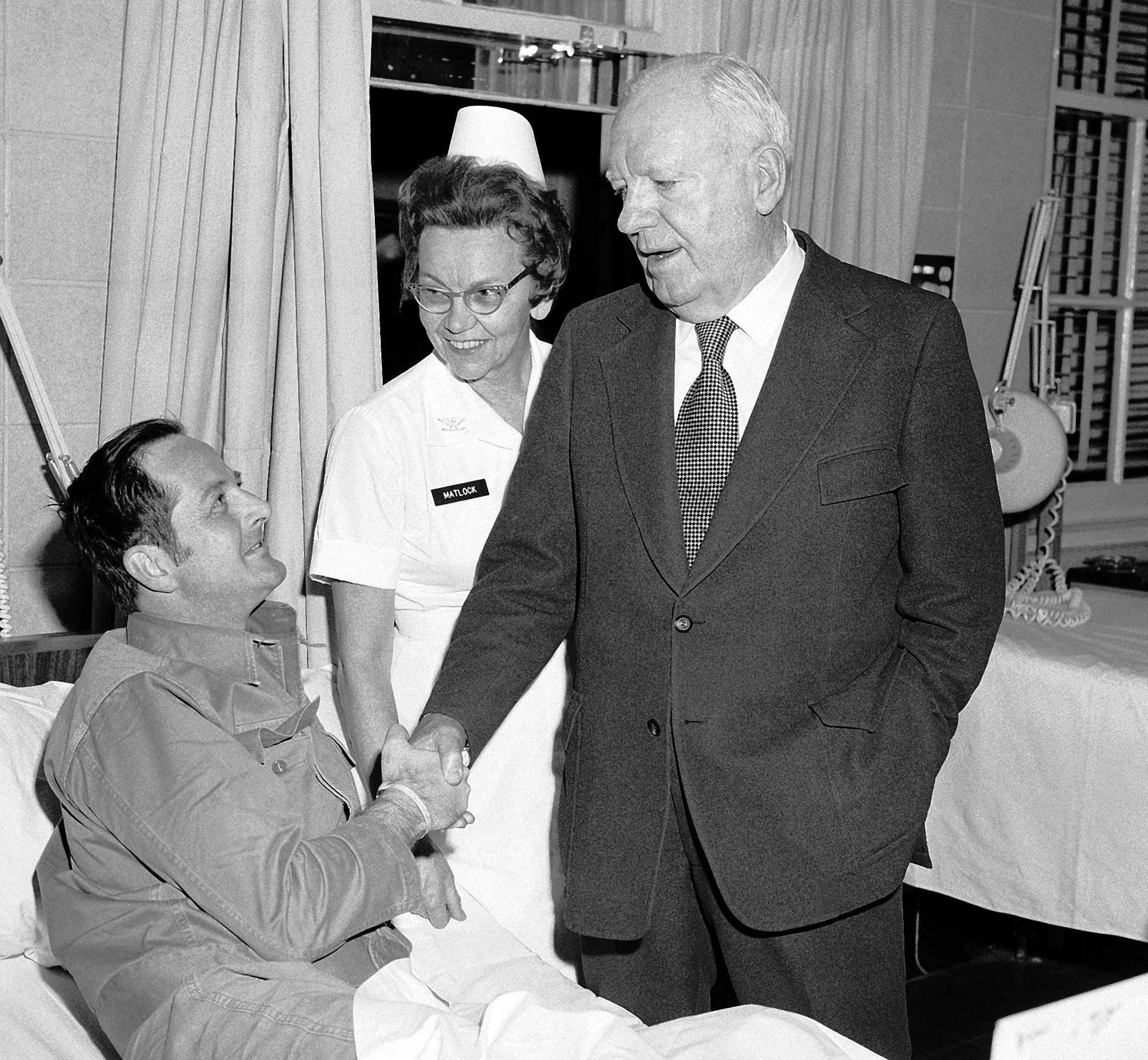
Pat O'Brien visiting Fitzsimons Army Medical Center in 1972

O'Brien's movie career slowed considerably by the early 1950s, although he still managed to get work in television. In his autobiography, The Wind at My Back, he professed to being completely flummoxed about the decline of his career. His close friend, Spencer Tracy, fought with his studio, MGM, to get roles for O'Brien in his films The People Against O'Hara (1951) and The Last Hurrah (1958).

He still had leads in films like Okinawa (1952), Inside Detroit (1956) and Kill Me Tomorrow (1957). In 1959 O'Brien appeared in a supporting role in one of his best-known movies as a police detective opposite George Raft in Some Like It Hot, starring Marilyn Monroe, Jack Lemmon, and Tony Curtis.

In his later years, O'Brien often worked in television. He was cast in 1956 and 1957 in four episodes of the religion anthology series, Crossroads. In three of the four programs, he played priests. He also performed in two episodes of The Virginian in the mid-1960s. In the 1960–1961 television season, O'Brien played James Harrigan, Sr. in a sitcom titled Harrigan and Son.

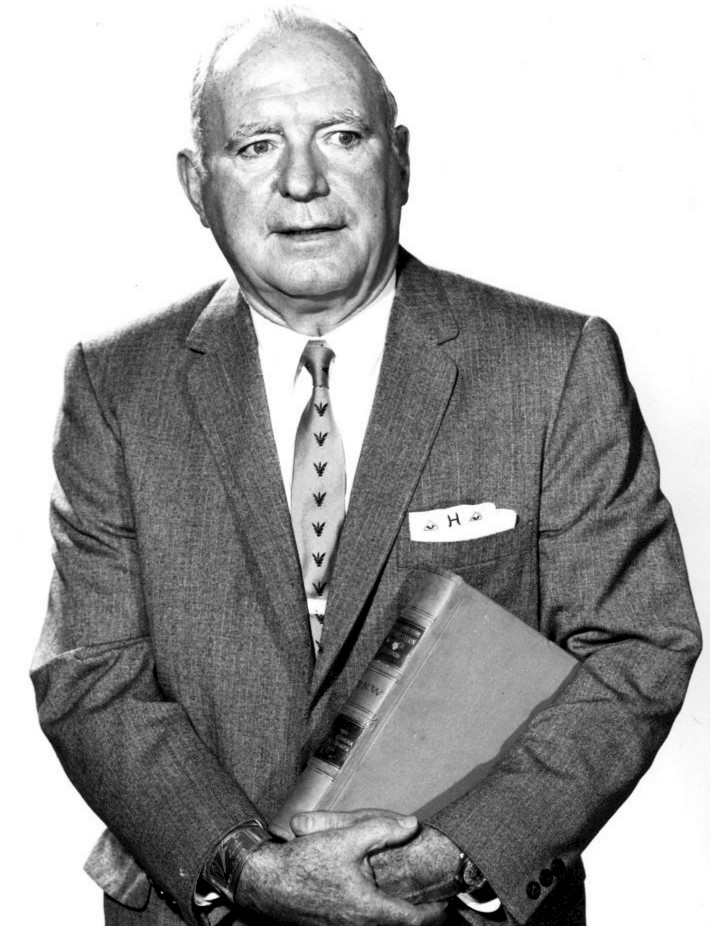
O'Brien in the Harrigan and Son television series, 1960

O'Brien made numerous appearances on television as himself, including several on The Ed Sullivan Show. In 1957, he guest starred in the first season of the NBC variety program, The Ford Show, Starring Tennessee Ernie Ford. Other shows in which he appeared as himself include the interview programs: The David Frost Show, The Tonight Show, The Merv Griffin Show, and The Joey Bishop Show. In 1957, Ralph Edwards profiled O'Brien's life and career for an episode of This Is Your Life. He was also the mystery guest on the game show What's My Line? in 1953 and 1957. In the "Jennifer and the Will" episode of WKRP in Cincinnati, he has a memorably comic turn as Jennifer Marlowe's elderly boyfriend. Shortly thereafter, O'Brien's final filmed performance came in a 1982 episode of Happy Days.

O'Brien spoke the Star Spangled Banner to the accompaniment of Doc Severinsen on trumpet for the National Anthem opening of Super Bowl IV in 1970. He was invited to do this because of his role as Knute Rockne.

He had a small role as Burt Reynolds' father in the 1978 comedy film The End, opposite Myrna Loy, cast as Reynolds' mother.

In later years, O'Brien recalled that he had had three "great" movie roles in his career: Knute Rockne, Hildy Johnson in The Front Page, and Father Duffy in The Fighting 69th.

From the 1960s through the early 1980s, O'Brien often traveled around the United States as a one-man act and in road shows. He also performed frequently in nightclubs.

Near the end of his life, he toured in a stage production of On Golden Pond, which he considered "absolutely the best play" he had ever read. O'Brien appeared twice at the historic summer stock venue, Elitch Theatre, in 1980's The Second Time Around with his wife, Eloise O'Brien, and 1981's On Golden Pond, again with Eloise, as well as his daughter, Brigid.

== "Irish Mafia" ==
In the late 1930s, O'Brien and a small group of his actor friends began to meet to converse and exchange opinions and stories. Hollywood columnist Sidney Skolsky dubbed them the "Irish Mafia," but they preferred to call their social group the "Boys Club." In addition to O'Brien, the original members of the club were James Cagney, Spencer Tracy, Allen Jenkins and Frank McHugh, all of whom were Irish-Americans. Later Lynne Overman joined their group and then George Brent, James Dunn, Louis Calhern, William Gargan, Paul Kelly, Regis Toomey, Brian Donlevy, Ralph Bellamy, Lloyd Nolan and Frank Morgan. James Gleason and Bert Lahr were also frequent guests. The actors gathered to socialize, but they also occasionally used the group to discuss ideas about their latest movies. By the mid-1940s the group began to break up, as members either moved or died. Some of the surviving members kept in contact by telephone and occasional meetings.

== Personal life ==
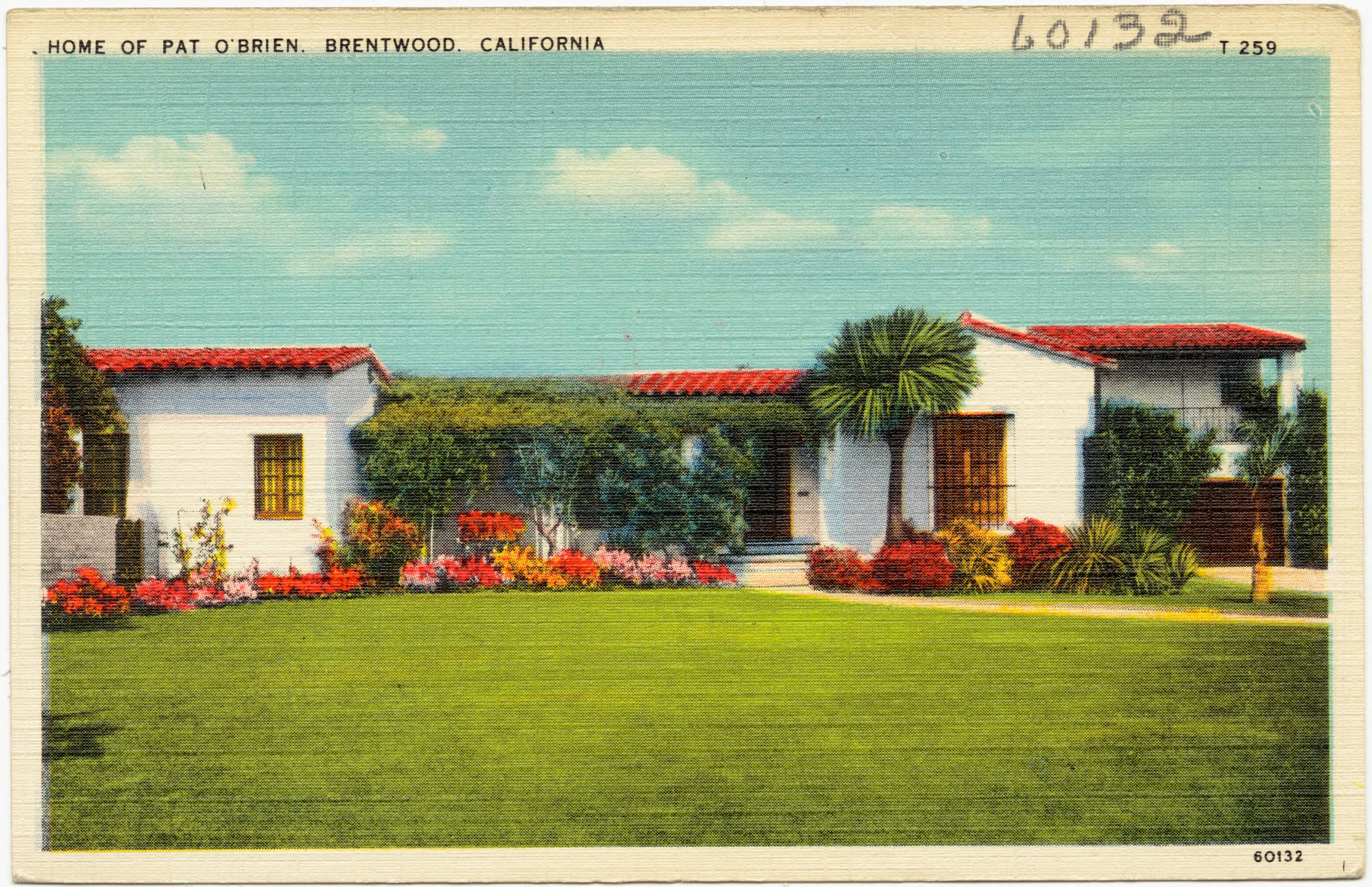
Postcard of Pat O'Brien's home in Brentwood, California

O'Brien and his wife, Eloise, had four children: Mavourneen, Sean, Terry, and Brigid. Three of his children were adopted. The youngest, Brigid O'Brien (1946-2016), was his biological child. Eloise O'Brien occasionally appeared on stage with her husband.

Among those who knew him personally, O'Brien was known for his love of storytelling, jokes, and late-night parties. Bob Hope specifically remembered him as a raconteur. Another friend recalled that he was always "the life, and I mean the lively life, of the party." He traveled to Vietnam as part of a US tour in February 1969.

=== Death ===
O'Brien died on October 15, 1983, from a heart attack at age 83, following minor prostate surgery. President Ronald Reagan released a White House statement noting his sadness over his old friend's death. The president had called the actor at the hospital just days before he died.

== Filmography ==
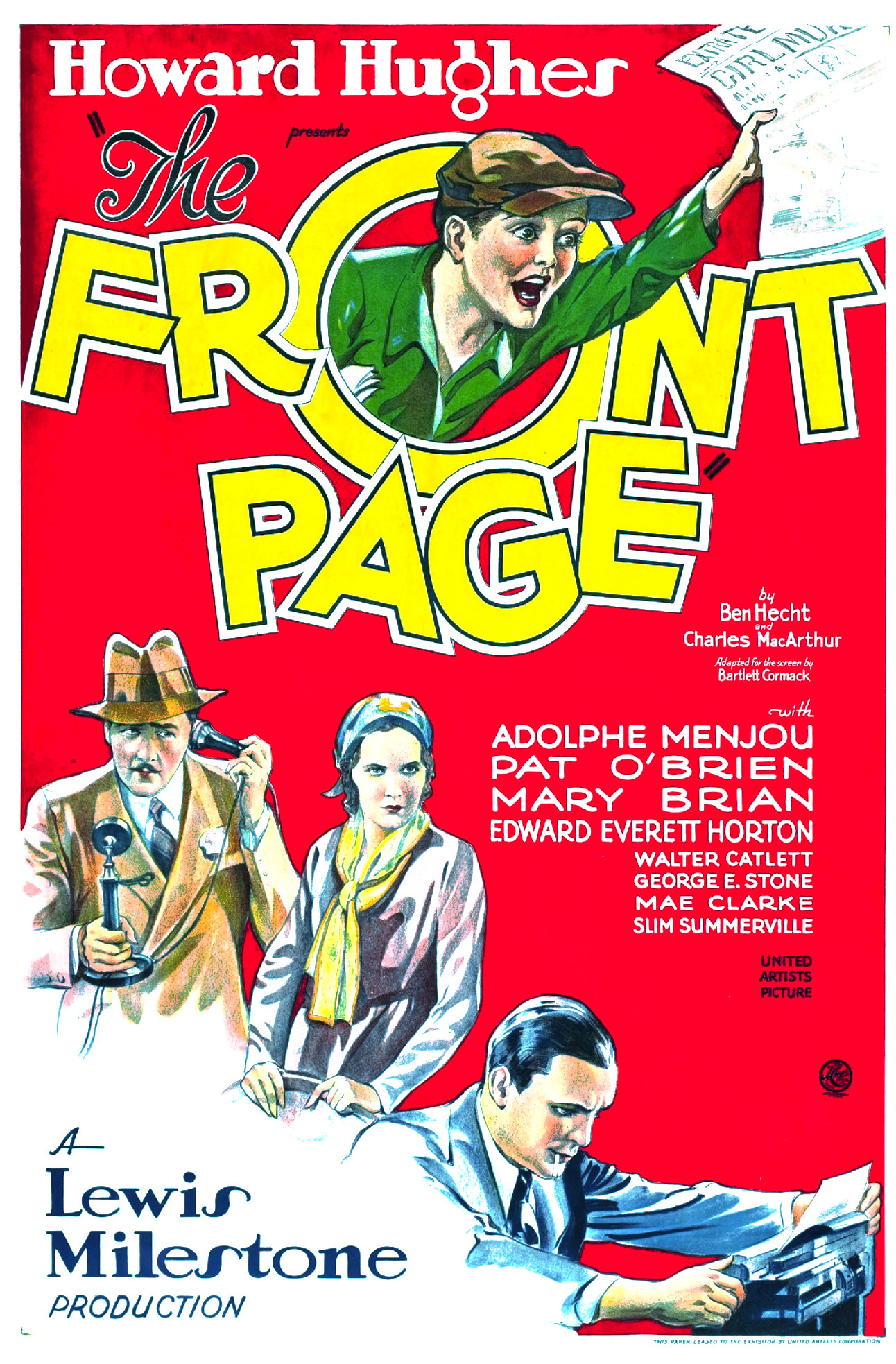
Poster for The Front Page (1931)

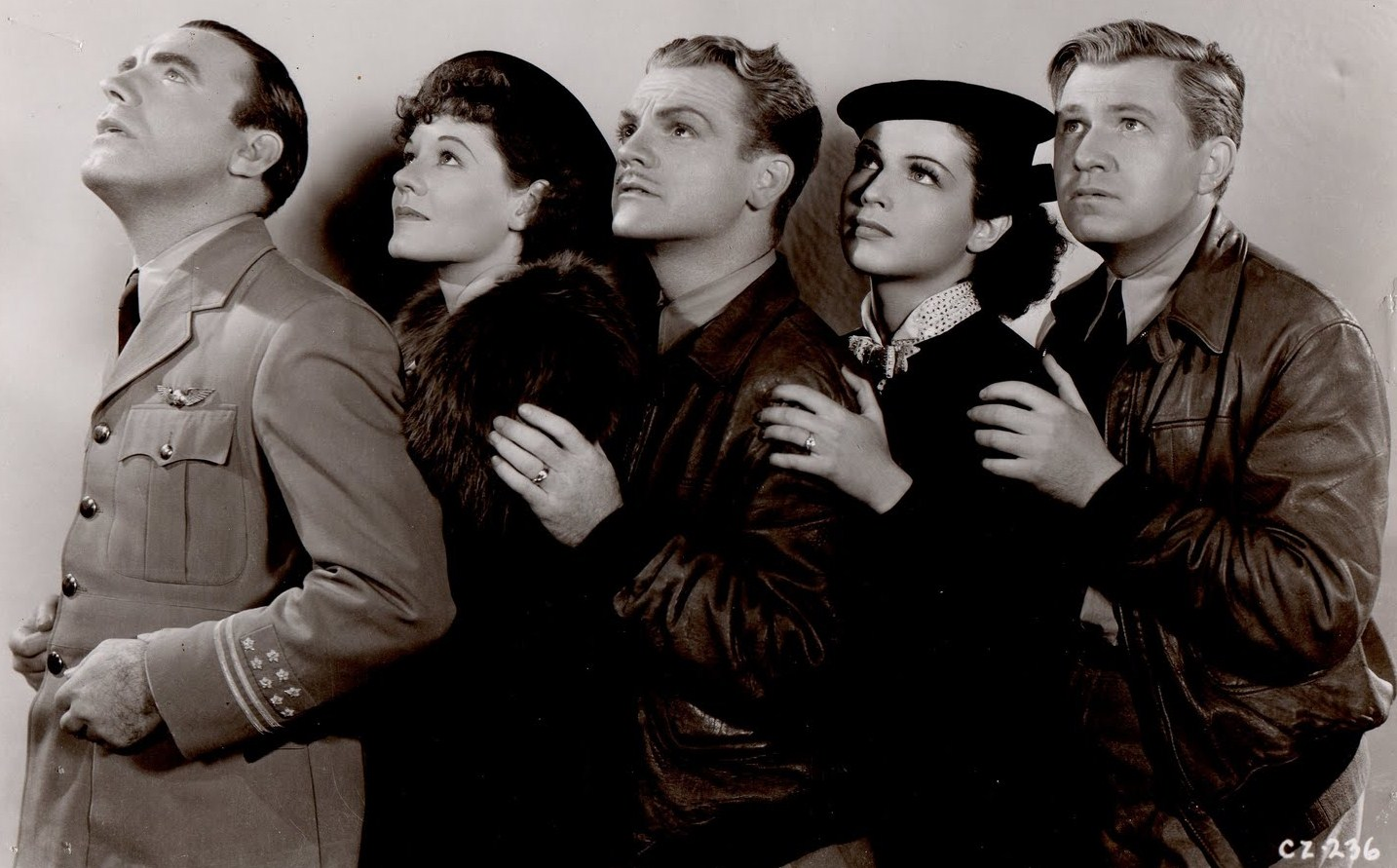
Promotional still for Ceiling Zero (1936), featuring Pat O'Brien, Martha Tibbetts, James Cagney, June Travis and Stuart Erwin

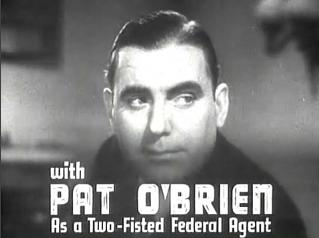
Pat O'Brien in Public Enemy's Wife (1936)

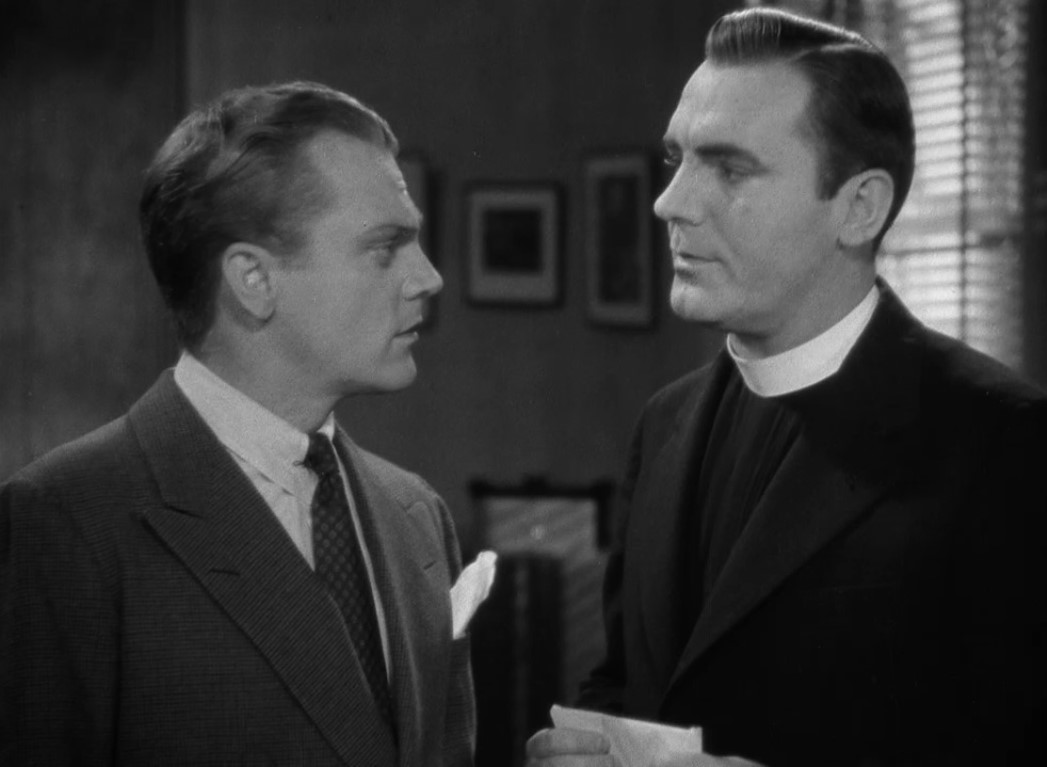
James Cagney and Pat O'Brien in Angels with Dirty Faces (1938)

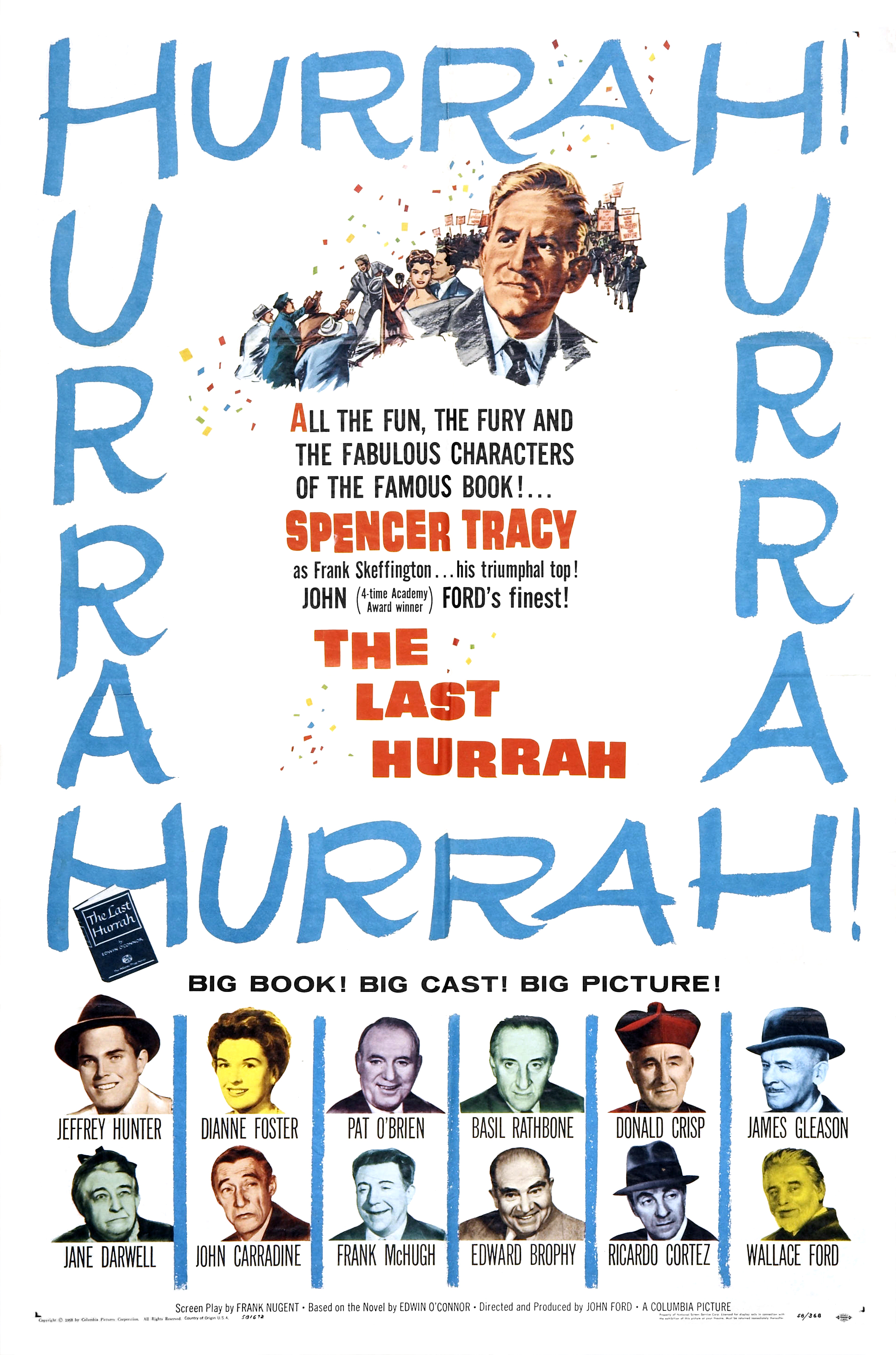
Poster for The Last Hurrah (1958)

Year	Title	Role	Notes
1930	The Nightingale		Short
1930	My Mistake		Short
1930	Compliments of the Season	Police Detective	Short
1931	Pat O'Brien in "Crimes Square"		Short
1931	Honor Among Lovers	Conroy	
1931	The Front Page	Hildy Johnson	
1931	Personal Maid	Peter Shea	
1931	Consolation Marriage	Steve Porter	
1931	Flying High	Sport Wardell	
1932	Hell's House	Matt Kelly	
1932	The Final Edition	Sam Bradshaw	
1932	Scandal for Sale	Waddell	
1932	The Strange Case of Clara Deane	Frank Deane	
1932	Hollywood Speaks	Jimmy Reed	
1932	American Madness	Matt Brown	
1932	Flaming Gold	Ben Lear	
1932	Virtue	Jimmy Doyle	
1932	Air Mail	Duke Talbot	
1933	Laughter in Hell	Barney Slaney	
1933	Destination Unknown	Matt Brennan	
1933	The World Gone Mad	Andy Terrell	
1933	Bureau of Missing Persons	Butch Saunders	
1933	Bombshell	Jim Brogan	
1933	College Coach	Coach Gore	
1934	I've Got Your Number	Terry Riley	
1934	Gambling Lady	Charlie Lang	
1934	Twenty Million Sweethearts	Rush Blake	
1934	The Personality Kid	Ritzy McCarty	
1934	Here Comes the Navy	Biff Martin	
1934	I Sell Anything	Spot Cash Cutler	
1934	Flirtation Walk	Scrapper Thornhill	
1935	Devil Dogs of the Air	Lieutenant Bill Brannigan	
1935	In Caliente	Larry MacArthur	
1935	Oil for the Lamps of China	Stephen Chase	
1935	The Irish in Us	Pat O'Hara	
1935	Page Miss Glory	Click Wiley	
1935	Stars Over Broadway	Al McGillevray	
1936	Ceiling Zero	Jake Lee	
1936	I Married a Doctor	Dr. William P. Kennicott	
1936	Public Enemy's Wife	Lee Laird	
1936	China Clipper	Dave Logan	
1937	The Great O'Malley	James Aloysius O'Malley	
1937	San Quentin	Capt. Stephen Jameson	
1937	Slim	Red Blayd	
1937	Back in Circulation	Bill Morgan	
1937	Submarine D-1	Butch Rogers	
1938	Women Are Like That	Bill Landin	
1938	Cowboy from Brooklyn	Ray Chadwick	
1938	Boy Meets Girl	J. C. Benson	
1938	Garden of the Moon	John Quinn	
1938	Angels with Dirty Faces	Jerry Connolly	
1939	Off the Record	Thomas Elliott	
1939	The Kid from Kokomo	Billy Murphy	
1939	Indianapolis Speedway	Joe Greer	
1939	The Night of Nights	Dan O'Farrell	
1939	Slightly Honorable	John Webb	
1940	The Fighting 69th	Father Francis Duffy	
1940	Castle on the Hudson	Warden Long	
1940	'Til We Meet Again	Steve Burke	
1940	Torrid Zone	Steve Case	
1940	Escape to Glory	Mike Farrough	
1940	Flowing Gold	Hap O'Connor	
1940	Knute Rockne, All American	Knute Rockne	
1942	Broadway	Dan McCorn	
1942	Two Yanks in Trinidad	Tim Reardon	
1942	Flight Lieutenant	Sam Doyle	
1942	The Navy Comes Through	Michael Mallory	
1943	Bombardier	Major Chick Davis	
1943	The Iron Major	Frank Cavanaugh	
1943	His Butler's Sister	Martin Murphy	
1944	Marine Raiders	Major Steve Lockhard	
1944	Secret Command	Sam Gallagher	
1945	Having Wonderful Crime	Michael J. Malone	
1945	Man Alive	Michael O'Flaherty "Speed" McBride	
1946	Perilous Holiday	Patrick Nevil	
1946	Crack-Up	George Steele	
1947	Riffraff	Dan Hammer	
1948	Fighting Father Dunne	Father Peter J. Dunne	
1948	The Boy with Green Hair	Gramp Frye	
1949	A Dangerous Profession	Joe Farley	
1950	Johnny One-Eye	Martin Martin	
1950	The Fireball	Father O'Hara	
1951	The Hills of Ireland	Narrator	
1951	Criminal Lawyer	James Edward Reagan	
1951	The People Against O'Hara	Vince Ricks	
1952	Okinawa	Lt. Commander Hale	
1954	Jubilee Trail	Ernest 'Texas' Conway	
1954	Ring of Fear	Frank Wallace	
1956	Inside Detroit	Gus Linden	
1957	Kill Me Tomorrow	Bart Crosbie	
1958	The Last Hurrah	John Gorman	
1959	Some Like It Hot	Detective Mulligan	
1962	The Road to Hong Kong	Chinese Restaurateur	Uncredited
1965	Town Tamer	Judge Murcott	
1969	The Over-the-Hill Gang	Captain Oren Hayes	TV movie
1970	The Phynx	Pat O'Brien	
1975	The Sky's the Limit	Abner Therman	
1977	Billy Jack Goes to Washington	Vice President	
1978	The End	Ben Lawson	
1981	Ragtime	Delphin	

Short Subjects:

- A Dream Comes True (1935)
- A Trip Thru a Hollywood Studio (1935)
- Swingtime in the Movies (1938)
- Out Where the Stars Begin (1938)
- Screen Snapshots: Famous Fathers and Sons (1946)
- Screen Snapshots: Hollywood's Happy Homes (1949)
- Screen Snapshots: Motion Picture Mothers, Inc. (1949)
- Screen Snapshots: Hopalong in Hoppy Land (1951)
- Screen Snapshots: Memorial to Al Jolson (1952)
- Screen Snapshots: Hollywood Mothers and Fathers (1955)
- Screen Snapshots: Hollywood Beauty (1955)

== Television credits ==
- Place the Face (CBS television series, March 11, 1954)
- Crossroads (three episodes, 1955–1957) as Father Patrick O'Neil / Father Edward Sullivan / Father Jim / Father Edmund Boyle
- Science Fiction Theatre (1955) (Are We Invaded?) as Dr. Arnold
- Sneak Preview (1956) (Season 1, Ep 5 "The Way Back")
- What's My Line? (10/13/1957) (Episode #384) (Season 9, Ep 7) as Mystery Guest
- Walt Disney Presents (1959) (I Captured the King of the Leprechauns) as Himself
- Joyful Hour (1960, TV Movie) as Host
- Harrigan and Son (1960–1961) as James Harrigan Sr.
- Going My Way in "The Boss of the Ward" (1963) as Frank McCaffey
- Hazel (1966) as Uncle Jerome Van Meter
- The Over-the-Hill Gang (1969, TV Movie) as Capt. Oren Hayes
- Welcome Home, Johnny Bristol (1972, TV Movie) as Sgt. McGll
- Adventures of Nick Carter (1972, TV Movie) as Hallelujah Harry (unsold pilot)
- McCloud (1973) as Mac Ferguson
- Kiss Me, Kill Me (1976, TV Movie) as Jimmy, morgue attendant
- Scout's Honor (1980, TV Movie) as Mr. Caboose
- WKRP In Cincinnati (1981) as Col. H. Buchanan
- Happy Days (1980–1982) as Uncle Joe (final appearance)

== Radio appearances ==
Year	Program	Episode	Co Star
1936	Lux Radio Theatre	Alias Jimmy Valentine	w/ Madge Evans
1939	Lux Radio Theatre	Angels With Dirty Faces	w/ James Cagney
1940	Lux Radio Theatre	Knute Rockne, All American	w/ Ronald Reagan & Fay Wray
1942	Lux Radio Theatre	The Fighting 69th	w/ Robert Preston
1943	Lux Radio Theatre	The Navy Comes Through	w/ George Murphy & Ruth Hussey
1943	Lux Radio Theatre	The Navy Comes Through	w/ Ruth Warrick & Chester Morris
1944	Lux Radio Theatre	His Butler's Sister	w/ Deanna Durbin
1945	Lux Radio Theatre	Grissly's Millions	w/ Lynn Bari
1946	Lux Radio Theatre	Crack-Up	w/ Lynn Bari
