= King of the Underworld =

King of the Underworld is the title of:

- King of the Underworld (1939 film), starring Humphrey Bogart and Kay Francis
- King of the Underworld (1952 film), a British crime film
