= Brother Rat =

1938 film by William Keighley

- Directed by: William Keighley
- Written by: Richard Macaulay; Jerry Wald
- Based on: Brother Rat; 1936 play by John Monks, Jr. and Fred Finklehoffe
- Produced by: Robert Lord; Hal B. Wallis
- Starring: Ronald Reagan; Jane Wyman; Priscilla Lane; Wayne Morris; Johnnie Davis; Jane Bryan
- Cinematography: Ernest Haller
- Edited by: William Holmes
- Music by: Heinz Roemheld
- Distributed by: Warner Bros. Pictures
- Release date: October 29, 1938
- Running time: 89 minutes
- Country: United States
- Language: English

Brother Rat is a 1938 American comedy drama film about cadets at Virginia Military Institute in Lexington, Virginia, directed by William Keighley, and starring Ronald Reagan, Priscilla Lane, Eddie Albert (in his film debut), Jane Wyman, and Wayne Morris.

The film is an adaptation of the successful Broadway play of the same name written by two former VMI cadets, John Monks, Jr. and Fred Finklehoffe, which ran for 577 performances between December 1936 and April 1938. Albert and supporting actor William Tracy reprised their roles from the stage productions.

After the film's production, Reagan married Wyman in 1940. The title refers to the term used for cadets in their first year at the institute. Scenes of the film were shot on site in Lexington on the institute's historic parade ground, and the baseball game scene was filmed at Alumni Memorial Field.

== Plot ==
At the Virginia Military Institute, roommates Billy Randolph (Wayne Morris), Dan Crawford (Ronald Reagan) and Bing Edwards (Eddie Albert) are three good-natured troublemakers who are trying to clean up their act in the weeks leading up to graduation. Still, try as they might, they cannot seem to stop breaking the rules, which include sneaking girlfriends on campus, and pawning the college's valuable sword to get money to bet on a baseball game. When the secretly married Edwards learns his wife (Jane Bryan) is pregnant, his preoccupation leads to events that really send everything out of order.

== Cast ==
- Ronald Reagan as Dan Crawford
- Priscilla Lane as Joyce Winfree
- Eddie Albert as Bing Edwards
- Jane Wyman as Claire Adams
- Wayne Morris as Billy Randolph
- Johnnie Davis as A. Furman Townsend, Jr.
- Jane Bryan as Kate Rice
- Henry O'Neill as Colonel Ramm
- Gordon Oliver as Capt. 'Lacedrawers' Rogers
- Larry Williams as Harley Harrington
- William Tracy as Misto Bottome
- Jessie Busley as Mrs. Brooks
- Olin Howland as Slim
- Louise Beavers as Jenny
- Isabel Withers as Nurse
- Sam Komie as Cadet
- Billy Smith as Cadet
- Allan Cavan as Superintendent (uncredited)
- Jerry Cecil as Cadet (uncredited)
- Don DeFore as Baseball Catcher (uncredited)
- Jerry Fletcher as Cadet With a Sweet Briar Girl (uncredited)
- Mildred Gover as Colonel Ramm's Maid (uncredited)
- Fred Hamilton as Newsreel Scott (uncredited)
- Dutch Hendrian as Baseball Coach (uncredited)
- Howard Leeds as Cadet (uncredited)
- Wilfred Lucas as Ballfield Doctor (uncredited)
- Hugh McArthur as Cadet (uncredited)
- George O'Hanlon as Orderly (uncredited)
- William T. Orr as Member of the Guard (uncredited)
- Mark Roberts as Tripod Andrews (uncredited)

== Reception ==
Frank S. Nugent of The New York Times called the film "an excellent transcription of the play, loyal to all its screenable material and matching the playwrights' lively humors in the added scenes." "None of the factors that made the play a success has been lost ... Albert gives a splendid performance," reported Variety. Film Daily wrote that Keighley gave the film "warm, sympathetic direction and has injected many human touches," and called Eddie Albert "a definite screen 'find'." Harrison's Reports declared it "A delightful comedy" with "excellent" performances. John Mosher of The New Yorker called it "a serviceable time-filler."

A sequel, Brother Rat and a Baby, with several of the same main actors, was released in 1940.

In 1952, Warner Bros. Pictures remade it as a Technicolor musical, About Face, with Gordon MacRae, Eddie Bracken and in his first film, Joel Grey.
