= Priscilla Lane =

American actress (1915–1995)

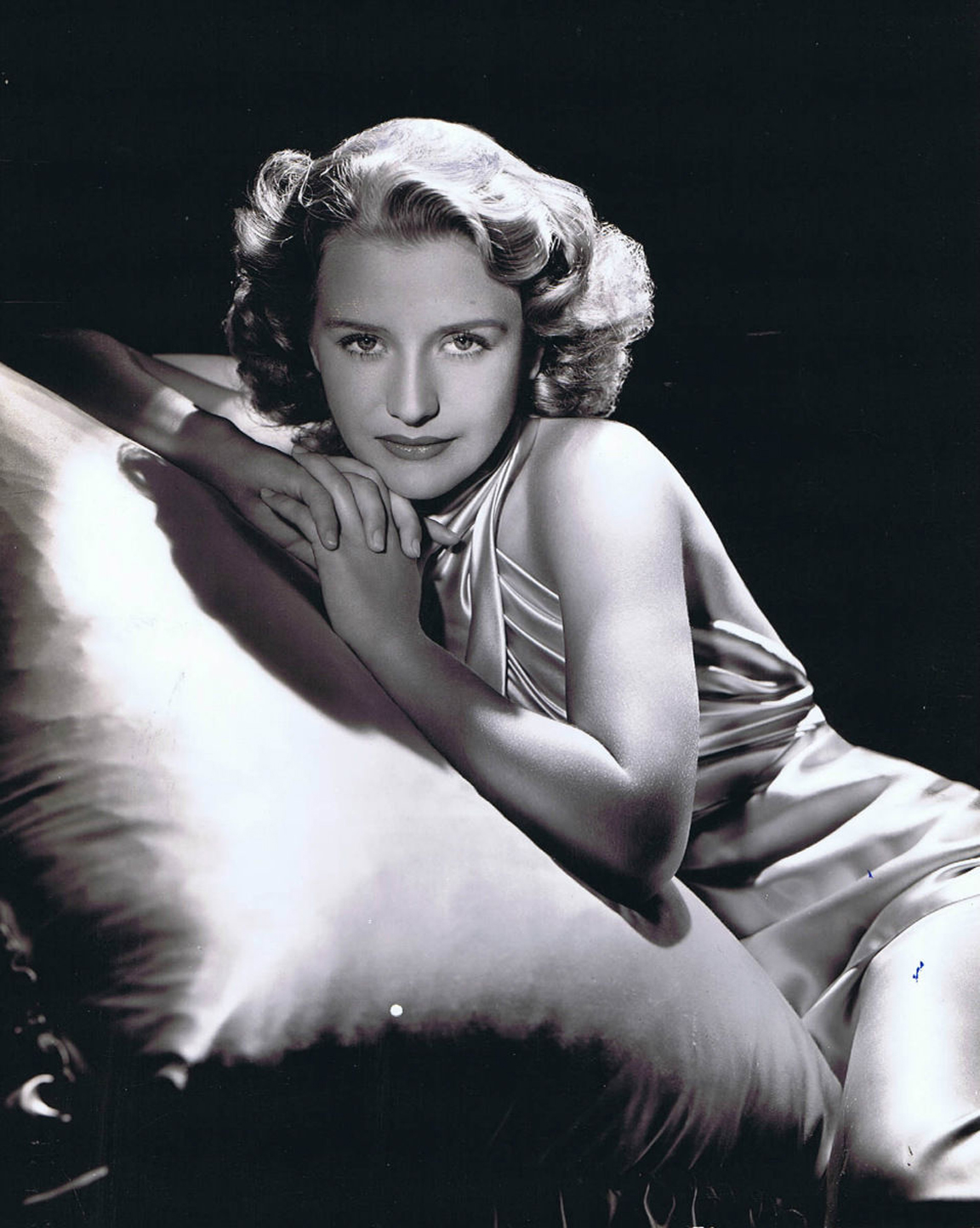
- Lane in 1939
- Born: Priscilla Mullican; June 12, 1915; Indianola, Iowa, U.S.
- Died: April 4, 1995 (aged 79); Andover, Massachusetts, U.S.
- Years active: 1937–1948, 1958
- Height: 5 ft 2 1/2 in (159 cm)
- Spouses: Oren W. Haglund (m. 1939; div. 1941) Joseph A. Howard (m. 1942; died 1976)
- Children: 4

Priscilla Lane (born Priscilla Mullican; June 12, 1915 – April 4, 1995) was an American actress, and the youngest sibling in the Lane Sisters' family of singers and actresses. She is best remembered for her roles in the films The Roaring Twenties (1939) co-starring with James Cagney and Humphrey Bogart; Saboteur (1942), an Alfred Hitchcock film in which she plays the heroine; and Arsenic and Old Lace (1944), in which she portrays Cary Grant's fiancée and bride.

== Early years ==
Priscilla Mullican was born in Indianola, Iowa, a small college town south of Des Moines. She was the youngest of five daughters of Lorenzo Mullican and his wife, Cora Bell Hicks. Mullican had a dental practice in Indianola. The family owned a large house with 22 rooms, some of which they rented to students attending nearby Simpson College.

Priscilla and one of her sisters, Rosemary, traveled to Des Moines every weekend to study dancing with Rose Lorenz, a renowned dance teacher at the time. The girls made their first professional appearance September 30, 1930, at Des Moines' Paramount Theater. Priscilla, then 15, performed on stage as part of the entertainment accompanying the release of her sister Lola's Hollywood movie Good News (1930).

After graduating from high school, Priscilla was permitted to travel to New York to visit a third sister, Leota (the eldest of the five Mullican sisters), then appearing in a musical revue in Manhattan. Priscilla enrolled at the nearby Fagen School of Dramatics, and Leota paid the fee. At this time, talent agent Al Altman saw Priscilla performing in one of Fagen's school plays and invited her to screentest for MGM. She was 16 years old. Priscilla wrote to a friend in Indianola, "Leota accompanied me to a sort of theater in a New York skyscraper. Others were there being made up. One was a strange looking girl with her hair slicked back in a sort of a bun. Her name is said to be Catherine Hepburn [sic]. Not very pretty, I thought, but Mr. Altman said she has something. Margaret Sullavan, the Broadway actress, was there too!" A follow-up letter said that her test had proven unsuitable. Neither Hepburn nor Sullavan was approved, and neither received a contract from MGM at the time.

In 1932, Cora and Rosemary arrived in New York. Cora immediately went to work pushing her two young daughters into attending auditions for various prospective Broadway productions, without success. During a tryout at a music publishing office, orchestra leader and radio personality Fred Waring heard them harmonizing. He found them attractive and talented and soon signed them to a radio contract. Priscilla, who at this time adopted the surname Lane, quickly became known as the comedienne of the group. Rosemary sang the ballads, while Priscilla performed the swing numbers and wisecracked with Waring and various guests. Back in Iowa, Mullican instituted divorce proceedings against his wife on the grounds of desertion, and the divorce was granted in 1933.

== Film career ==
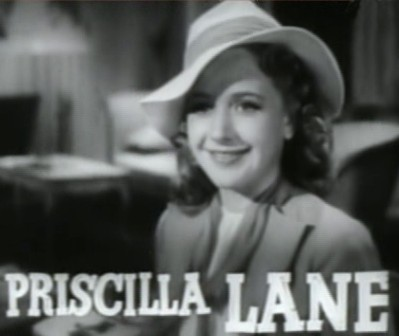
Priscilla Lane in Cowboy from Brooklyn, 1938

Rosemary and Priscilla remained with Fred Waring for almost five years. In 1937, Waring was engaged by Warner Bros. in Hollywood to appear with his entire band in Varsity Show, a musical starring Dick Powell. Both Rosemary and Priscilla were tested and awarded feature roles in the film. Rosemary shared the romantic passages with Powell, while Priscilla played a high-spirited college girl.

Warner Bros. purchased Priscilla and Rosemary's contract from Fred Waring and signed them to seven-year pacts. Priscilla's first film after Varsity Show was Men Are Such Fools (1938), in which she starred with Wayne Morris. This was followed by Love Honor and Behave (also 1938), another light romantic comedy with Morris, who, playing her husband, spanked her 47 times in a scene for which she declined a double, and Cowboy from Brooklyn, again teaming with Dick Powell. The publicity department at the studio suggested that Priscilla and Morris be seen together around town. They liked each other and did date for a period; however, Priscilla later said it was never serious on either side.

Also in 1938, Priscilla, Rosemary and third sister Lola Lane appeared as three of four sisters (the fourth being Gale Page) in Four Daughters, the similarly themed Daughters Courageous the following year, and two sequels to Four Daughters a few years later, Four Wives and Four Mothers.

Priscilla was next assigned the lead in Brother Rat, which had been a very successful Broadway play. Again she played opposite Wayne Morris, and among the cast were newcomers Ronald Reagan, Jane Wyman, Jane Bryan, and Eddie Albert. The film, when released in October 1938, was a big success for all the young players. At this time of professional success, the sisters were informed that Mullican had died in Iowa.

After winning her raise, Priscilla returned to work, but the films assigned to her were no better than those she had turned down. Brother Rat and a Baby (aka, Baby Be Good, 1940) was an inferior sequel and Three Cheers for the Irish (also 1940) gave her little to do.

The British Picturegoer magazine, always a supporter of the Lane Sisters, stated that all was not right with Priscilla Lane. In its June 15, 1940 issue, they wondered why "Priscilla was still knocking at the door of major stardom". They felt Warner Bros. was casting her as stooge to such actors as John Garfield and James Cagney. They went on to say Priscilla had great charm and while not a really great dramatic actress, deserved much larger and more important roles than she was getting. The same magazine, two years later on August 22, 1942, referred to their 1940 article and once again expressed disappointment at Warners' treatment of the star. They were unaware that she had already left the studio.

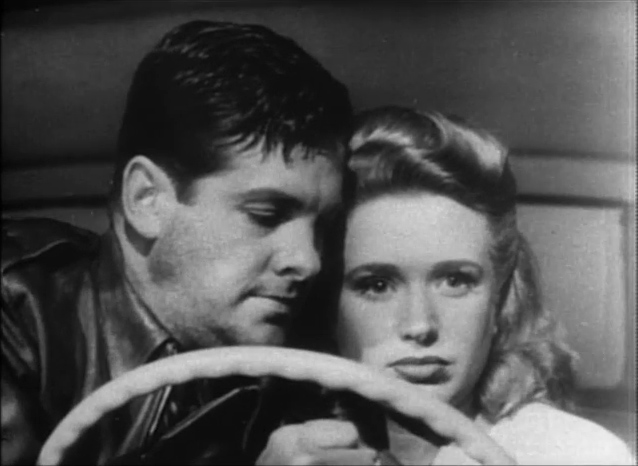
Priscilla Lane and Robert Cummings in Saboteur, 1942

On April 28, 1941, she was heard on Lux Radio Theater with George Brent and Gail Patrick in Wife, Husband and Friend. At Warner Bros. she appeared in a lighthearted comedy, Million Dollar Baby (1941), opposite Ronald Reagan, and as a night club singer in Blues in the Night (also 1941).

Frank Capra requested her for the lead opposite Cary Grant in Arsenic and Old Lace. The comedy film was completed in early 1942, but was not released until 1944; it was held up by contractual agreement not to distribute the film until the play's long Broadway run was over. It was Priscilla's last Warner film. Her contract was terminated by mutual agreement after five years with the studio.

She freelanced next, signing a one-picture deal with Universal Studios where she starred with Robert Cummings in Alfred Hitchcock's Saboteur (1942). The director did not want either Cummings or Lane for their roles. Hitchcock felt Lane was too much the girl next door. Universal insisted that they play the leads, and when the film was released, her acting was praised while some criticism was focused on Hitchcock for reworking so much from his earlier films into this wartime spy drama.

She had commitments for two more films. The first was Silver Queen (1942) for producer Harry Sherman in which she co-starred with George Brent. She played the owner of a gambling house in 1870s San Francisco. The other film was a Jack Benny comedy, The Meanest Man in the World, released in January 1943. Lane then retired from films. For the duration of the war, she followed her husband across America as he moved from one military base to another. She was generous with her talents and often performed at camp shows.

While living in Van Nuys, she was offered and accepted the leading role in Fun on a Weekend (1947) for producer–director Andrew Stone, co-starring Eddie Bracken. When the film was released, Variety opined, "Miss Lane, who's been absent from films for some time, gives a good enough performance which should ensure her work in more pictures." However, Lane returned to domestic life. Once again she and her husband moved, this time to Studio City.

Priscilla accepted the offer of the lead role opposite Lawrence Tierney in a film noir, Bodyguard (1948), starring as Doris Brewster. During an interview with a Hollywood correspondent, she stated, "I didn't realize how much I miss filming until I came back. I love this work, and I hope to make many, many more pictures." Bodyguard would be her last picture. An expected contract with RKO Studios did not come to pass.

In January 1951, Priscilla's mother Cora Mullican died at the San Fernando Valley home her daughters had bought for her years earlier. Priscilla returned to show business briefly in 1958 with her own show on a local television station broadcasting from Boston. Titled The Priscilla Lane Show, she chatted and interviewed celebrities visiting the area. She enjoyed the television experience, but family demands proved too much, and she gave up after a year.

== Personal life ==
Lane dated assistant director and screenwriter Oren W. Haglund, later the production manager of eleven ABC/Warner Brothers television series of the 1950s and 1960s. Impulsively she eloped with Haglund to Yuma, Arizona, on January 14, 1939, but left him the following day. They were divorced in May 1941. On June 14, 1941, Lane's mother announced Priscilla's engagement to newspaper publisher John Barry, whom Priscilla had first met in 1939. Priscilla wrote in the November issue of Photoplay about how she looked forward to their marriage and would continue her career.

In early 1942, the engagement to Barry ended after she met Joseph Howard, a 27-year-old Army Air Corps lieutenant, at a dude ranch in the Mojave Desert. A native of Lawrence, Massachusetts, he had joined the Army Air Corps straight from college in 1939. He was scouting the area for likely sites for air bases and had taken a short vacation. The couple were married on May 22, 1942, in Las Vegas, Nevada.

At the war's end in 1945, Lane and Howard were living in New Mexico and she was pregnant with their first child. They had a son. In 1946, after Howard's discharge from the service, the couple moved back to California, where they resided in Victorville. Howard, who had a degree in engineering, became a building contractor. The family moved to Van Nuys in December 1945. Afterwards Howard and Lane moved to Studio City. Priscilla became pregnant again in 1949. They had a daughter. By June 1951, the boom in the construction industry in New England had Lane and her family moving back to Howard's native Massachusetts. Howard left the final decision to end her career to Lane, who later declared she never regretted her choice. She fell in love with New England, and the couple settled with their children in Andover, Massachusetts. Lane was busy with her family. She gave birth to a second daughter and later another son.

Outside her family, Priscilla remained busy. She was devoutly religious, having converted to Roman Catholicism, as had her elder sisters. The family attended church regularly, and she was involved with Catholic charities. She enjoyed tending her garden, and growing flowers and vegetables. She ran a Girl Scout troop and volunteered at local hospitals. In July 1972, Joe Howard retired from business, and he and Lane moved to their summer home at 7 Howards Grove in Derry, New Hampshire. Howard died suddenly on May 18, 1976, aged 60. He was still in the Air Force Reserve, which he had joined after his discharge from active duty in 1946. He was buried at Arlington National Cemetery with full military honors. Heartbroken, Priscilla remained afterward in Derry. She said, more than a year later in 1977, "I'm still trying to pull myself together after Joe's death." She busied herself with volunteer work and her garden.

Lane was diagnosed with lung cancer in 1994. She moved to a nursing home, Wingate, in Andover, near a son and his family. She died there at 7:30 a.m. on April 4, 1995, from lung cancer and chronic heart failure, aged 79. A funeral mass was celebrated at St. Matthew's Church in Windham, New Hampshire. She was laid to rest beside her husband.

== Filmography ==
Year	Film	Role	Director	Notes
1937	Varsity Show	Betty Bradley	William Keighley	
1938	Love, Honor and Behave	Barbara Blake		
1938	Men Are Such Fools	Linda Lawrence Hall	Busby Berkeley	
1938	Cowboy from Brooklyn	Jane Hardy	Lloyd Bacon	
1938	Four Daughters	Ann Lemp	Michael Curtiz	
1938	Brother Rat	Joyce Winfree	William Keighley	
1939	Yes, My Darling Daughter	Ellen Murray	William Keighley	
1939	Daughters Courageous	Buff Masters	Michael Curtiz	
1939	Dust Be My Destiny	Mabel Alden	Lewis Seiler	
1939	The Roaring Twenties	Jean Sherman, later Jean Hart	Raoul Walsh	
1939	Four Wives	Ann Lemp Borden	Michael Curtiz	
1940	Brother Rat and a Baby	Joyce Winfree	Ray Enright	
1940	Three Cheers for the Irish	Maureen Casey	Lloyd Bacon	
1941	Four Mothers	Ann Lemp Deitz	William Keighley	
1941	Million Dollar Baby	Pamela "Pam" McAllister	Curtis Bernhardt	
1941	Blues in the Night	Ginger "Character" Powell	Anatole Litvak	
1942	Saboteur	Patricia "Pat" Martin	Alfred Hitchcock	
1942	Silver Queen	Coralie Adams	Lloyd Bacon	
1943	The Meanest Man in the World	Janie Brown	Sidney Lanfield	
1944	Arsenic and Old Lace	Elaine Harper	Frank Capra	
1947	Fun on a Week-End	Nancy Crane	Andrew L. Stone	
1948	Bodyguard	Doris Brewster	Richard Fleischer	
