= The Convict's Code =

1930 American film

The Convict's Code is an American film directed by Harry Revier. Considered a low-budget melodrama, it uses a screenplay by Mabel Z. Carroll and Vincent Valentini. It is a black and white film seven reels in length, and has a running time of 66 minutes. It was made by producer W. Ray Johnston's film company, and was distributed by Syndicate Pictures. It was the last film that actor Cullen Landis starred in. According to the American Film Institute the film was released in August 1930. However, film historian Michael R. Pitts states the film was released on October 5, 1930.

== Cast ==
- Cullen Landis as Kenneth Avery
- Eloise Taylor as Nan Perry
- William Morris as Theodore Perry
- Robert Cummings as Governor Johnson
- Lyle Evans as Robert Shannon
- Mabel Z. Carroll as Mazie Lawrence
- John Irwin as a lifer
- John Burkell as trusty

== Plot ==
Former stockbroker Kenneth Avery is in prison for the murder of Mazie Lawrence. He is sentenced to death by electrocution. Nan Perry makes a plea to the governor for his life, but is unsuccessful. His execution is interrupted by a prison break. Robert Shannon, a fellow convict, is fatally injured in the prison escape. As he is dying he confesses to Mazie' murder and exonerates Kenneth.
