= Ragtime (film) =

1981 film by Miloš Forman

- Theatrical release poster
- Directed by: Miloš Forman
- Screenplay by: Michael Weller; Bo Goldman (uncredited)
- Based on: Ragtime by E.L. Doctorow
- Produced by: Dino De Laurentiis
- Starring: James Cagney; Mary Steenburgen; Howard Rollins; Brad Dourif; James Olson; Elizabeth McGovern
- Cinematography: Miroslav Ondříček
- Edited by: Anne V. Coates; Antony Gibbs; Stanley Warnow
- Music by: Randy Newman
- Production companies: Ragtime Productions Ltd.; Sunley Productions
- Distributed by: Paramount Pictures
- Release date: November 20, 1981
- Running time: 155 minutes
- Country: United States
- Language: English
- Budget: $28.3–32 million
- Box office: $21.2 million (rentals)

Ragtime is a 1981 American historical drama film directed by Miloš Forman, based on E. L. Doctorow's 1975 novel of the same name. It is set in and around New York City at the start of the 20th century, mainly in New Rochelle and Atlantic City, and includes fictionalized references to actual people and events of the time. The film stars James Cagney, Mary Steenburgen, Howard Rollins, Brad Dourif, James Olson and Elizabeth McGovern.

Ragtime featured Cagney's and Pat O'Brien's final film appearances, as well as early roles by Jeff Daniels (his film debut), Fran Drescher, Samuel L. Jackson, Ethan Phillips and John Ratzenberger.

== Plot ==
At the start of the 20th century, architect Stanford White unveils a nude statue atop Madison Square Garden, modeled after former chorus girl Evelyn Nesbit. After learning of this, Nesbit's husband, millionaire industrialist Harry Kendall Thaw, becomes convinced White has corrupted her and publicly shoots him dead.

An upper-class family resides in New Rochelle, New York, where the father owns a factory and his wife's younger brother makes fireworks. An African American baby is abandoned in their garden, and upon learning the police intend to charge the child's mother, Sarah, with child abandonment and attempted murder, Mother takes Sarah and her child into the home despite Father's objections. Ragtime pianist Coalhouse Walker arrives in search of Sarah, driving a new Ford Model T, and, realizing he is the baby's father, announces his intention to marry Sarah.

Younger Brother witnesses White's murder and becomes obsessed with Evelyn. Thaw's lawyer Delmas bribes Evelyn with a million-dollar divorce settlement to keep silent about Thaw's mental instability and to testify that White abused her. Passing through the Lower East Side, Evelyn encounters street artist Tateh, who throws out his unfaithful wife. He leaves New York City with their daughter and sells the flip book he created. Evelyn and Younger Brother begin an affair as she prepares her return to the stage, while he assumes they will eventually marry. After Thaw is found not guilty by reason of temporary insanity, his lawyers inform Evelyn that Thaw will sue her for divorce on the grounds of infidelity and she accepts a smaller settlement. The affair ends, leaving Younger Brother adrift.

In New Rochelle, Coalhouse is targeted by bigoted volunteer firemen led by Willie Conklin, who refuse to allow his automobile to pass by. Coalhouse finds a policeman and returns to find his car soiled with horse manure. Coalhouse attempts to force the policeman to intervene, but the policeman insists that Coalhouse should clean the manure off his car and move on, giving him the choice to do so or be arrested. Coalhouse refuses, and is hauled in to the local precinct. After Father arranges for Coalhouse's release, they discover his car has been further vandalized. Coalhouse pursues legal action, but can find no lawyer willing to represent him. Father and Younger Brother argue over Coalhouse's legal recourse. At a presidential rally, Sarah attempts to tell President Roosevelt about Coalhouse's case but is beaten by guards and dies.

After Sarah's funeral, Coalhouse and his supporters kill several firemen. He threatens to attack other firehouses, demanding his car be restored and Conklin be turned over to him. Father is disgusted at the violence but Younger Brother joins Coalhouse's gang with his knowledge of explosives. Ostracized by their own white community and hounded by reporters, Father and Mother leave for Atlantic City. They encounter Tateh, now a film director on a photoplay with Evelyn. Mother is attracted to Tateh and she and Father quarrel. Coalhouse's gang hold the Pierpont Morgan Library's collection hostage. Police Commissioner Rhinelander Waldo sends for Coalhouse's child as a bargaining chip but Mother refuses to give him up. Father demands she turn the child over and returns to New York City to assist Waldo and Mother leaves.

Booker T. Washington fails to persuade Coalhouse to surrender, as does Father. Conklin is captured by police and forced to apologize to Coalhouse. Waldo is disgusted by Conklin's bigotry but cannot submit to terrorist demands and has him arrested. Coalhouse agrees to surrender if Waldo permits his supporters to depart in his restored car and Waldo agrees after Father volunteers to stay as a hostage. Coalhouse's supporters escape and he drives Father out of the library.

Ready to blow himself up, Coalhouse instead surrenders but is shot dead on Waldo's orders. The film ends with another newsreel: Evelyn dances in vaudeville and Thaw is released from an asylum. Houdini escapes from a straitjacket several stories above the ground, while newspapers announce that World War I has begun. Younger Brother returns to his fireworks job and Father watches from the house in New Rochelle as Mother departs with Tateh and Coalhouse's son.

== Cast ==
- James Cagney as Commissioner Rhinelander Waldo
- Brad Dourif as Younger Brother
- Moses Gunn as Booker T. Washington
- Elizabeth McGovern as Evelyn Nesbit
- Kenneth McMillan as Fire Chief Willie Conklin
- Pat O'Brien as Delmas
- Donald O'Connor as Evelyn's Dance Instructor
- James Olson as Father
- Mandy Patinkin as Tateh
- Howard Rollins as Coalhouse Walker Jr.
- Mary Steenburgen as Mother
- Debbie Allen as Sarah
- Jeffrey DeMunn as Harry Houdini
- Robert Joy as Harry Kendall Thaw
- Eloise O'Brien as Mrs. Thaw
- Norman Mailer as Stanford White
- Edwin Cooper as Grandfather
- Jeff Daniels as P.C. O'Donnell
- Fran Drescher as Mameh
- Frankie Faison as gang member
- Alan Gifford as judge
- Richard Oldfield as stock reporter
- Richard Griffiths as Delmas' assistant
- George Harris as Clef Club bandleader
- Samuel L. Jackson as gang member
- Michael Jeter as special reporter
- Andreas Katsulas as policeman No.3
- Joe Praml as policeman No.8
- Calvin Levels as gang member
- Bessie Love as old lady (T.O.C.)
- Christopher Malcolm as police captain
- Stuart Milligan as the marksman
- Zack Norman as manager
- Ethan Phillips as guard at family house
- Barry Dennen as stage manager
- Jan Tříska as special reporter
- Robert Dorning as gent with Stanford White

Ragtime is notable for the final film appearances of James Cagney and Pat O'Brien; Cagney had not acted in a film for nearly 20 years prior to his final movie role in Ragtime. The film also features early appearances by several actors who would later achieve greater fame. Among them are Samuel L. Jackson, Debbie Allen, Jeff Daniels, Elizabeth McGovern, Richard Griffiths, Fran Drescher, Andreas Katsulas, Ethan Phillips, Mandy Patinkin, John Ratzenberger, and Stuart Milligan.

== Production ==
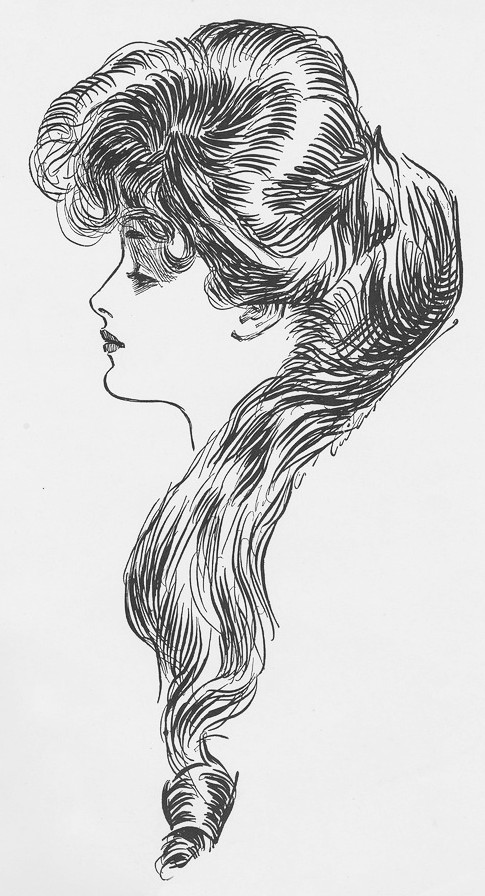
The Eternal Question, a portrait of Evelyn Nesbit by Charles Dana Gibson, inspired the film's poster.

=== Pre-production ===
Ragtime was adapted from E. L. Doctorow's acclaimed 1975 novel that earned the National Book Critics Award and secured a spot in numerous critics' top-ten lists. Bantam Books acquired paperback rights for a record $1.8 million, recovering their investment after selling four million copies. An additional one million copies were sold, and half a million more were printed in conjunction with the film's release.

In 1975, producer Dino De Laurentiis purchased the film rights for $250,000, and Robert Altman joined the project as director. Altman and Doctorow rejected Joan Tewkesbury's initial draft in 1976, as it focused primarily on Mother's journey, deviating from their shared vision of the movie's structure. Doctorow wrote a 1,000-page draft of the screenplay himself, which Altman envisioned filming in its entirety as two three-hour movies; De Laurentiis disagreed, and Altman and Doctorow were both dismissed from the project. Miloš Forman and Michael Weller were hired as director and screenwriter, respectively, and streamlined the script by focusing primarily on Coalhouse Walker and omitting notable historical figures who had appeared in the novel, such as Henry Ford and Sigmund Freud.

=== Casting ===
Mick Jagger, Bob Dylan, and Bruce Springsteen expressed interest in playing Younger Brother, while Redd Foxx, Muhammad Ali, and O. J. Simpson were considered to play Coalhouse Walker. Renowned actor James Cagney, who knew Forman socially, was enticed back to the screen after a two-decade retirement to play New York Police Commissioner Rheinlander Waldo. The role was significantly expanded from the novel to give Cagney more screentime. In preparation for her role as Evelyn Nesbit, Elizabeth McGovern gathered insights from a friend of her mother who knew Nesbit in the latter part of her life. Mariclare Costello was cast as anarchist Emma Goldman and filmed scenes, but her entire part was ultimately cut by De Laurentiis.

=== Filming ===
Principal photography took place in 1980 over twenty weeks, divided between the U.S. and London. Ten days were spent filming on the Lower East Side of New York City, with additional days in uptown Manhattan. Seven weeks of filming covered various locations in Westchester, New York, the state of Connecticut, and along the New Jersey shore. Shepperton Studios in London constructed significant sets, including a meticulous reproduction of a six-and-a-half-acre stretch of Madison Avenue c. 1900 and the formal façade and lush interiors of the J. P. Morgan Library. St. Mary's Episcopal Church in Harlem, New York, served as the backdrop for Sarah's funeral scene. The film's budget amounted to $32 million. Ragtime was among thirty theatrical features that entered into an interim agreement with the Screen Actors Guild to avoid a production shutdown caused by an actors strike.

Art director Patrizia Von Brandenstein described the transformation of East 11th Street between Avenues A and B into the backdrop for Evelyn's encounter with the street silhouette artist "Tateh" on Manhattan's Lower East Side. Carpenters and painters worked on this location due to a blend of existing period architecture and moderate commercial activity, choosing it over the more familiar and bustling Orchard Street. The production altered storefronts, replacing Spanish signage with Hebrew writing to better suit the historical context. To secure this location, the production agreed to donate "$5,000 to a community-sponsored project," along with the standard compensation for property owners. Additional arrangements included providing garage parking for contemporary cars and setting up a temporary "Ragtime Summer Camp" behind Kalish's Shoestore for over forty children who could not play on the street during filming. One address on the street was reverted to its original function as a livery stable to accommodate the production's fifteen horses, with inspection by the American Society for the Prevention of Cruelty to Animals.

In Mount Kisco, New York, Von Brandenstein spent three months converting a fifteen-room Victorian home to represent the film's archetypical middle-class family setting. The transformation involved rebuilding porches, graveling the driveway, installing an antique kitchen, hanging hand-blocked period wallpaper, and adding a gazebo to evoke a turn-of-the-century ambiance. The production rented the home for $20,000 for a three-week shoot, investing an additional $40,000 in permanent improvements while accommodating the homeowners' preferences by removing any alterations they disliked.

=== Music ===
Randy Newman crafted an original score to capture the mood of the film's historical period, avoiding the use of music from that era. The decision was influenced by the perception that most original recordings from the early 1900s were "too tinny or scratchy" for practical use. Tracking down pristine recordings would have required extensive research, leading Newman to choose the option of recreating popular music from that time.

=== Marketing ===
To appeal to black audiences, Paramount Pictures launched a second print advertising campaign. The poster featured actors Howard E. Rollins, Moses Gunn, Debbie Allen, and James Cagney, accompanied by the statement: "A black man said 'Respect me or kill me!' They took away Coalhouse's wife, child, and pride. He made them pay in a way America will never forget. It was a tough time... it was Ragtime."

== Reception ==
The film holds an aggregated score of 85% from Rotten Tomatoes, based on 20 reviews, and a 57/100 from Metacritic, indicating mixed or average reviews. Gene Siskel chose it as the best film of 1981. Roger Ebert gave it three-and-a-half out of four stars, calling it "a loving, beautifully mounted, graceful film that creates its characters with great clarity. We understand where everyone stands, and most of the time we even know why." Vincent Canby gave the film a more mixed review, praising the performances and cinematography but criticizing Forman's narrative choices that created an unclear sense of time and prioritized certain storylines at the cost of others: "[Ragtime] is sorrowful, funny and beautiful. It is also, finally, very unsatisfactory." Christopher Null gave the film a negative review, calling it "a jumbled and largely uninteresting mess". It was nominated for eight Academy Awards, though it did not win any.

== Awards and honors ==
Awards and nominations
Award	Category	Nominee(s)	Result	Ref.
Academy Awards	Best Actor in a Supporting Role	Howard E. Rollins Jr.	Nominated	
Academy Awards	Best Actress in a Supporting Role	Elizabeth McGovern	Nominated	
Academy Awards	Best Screenplay – Based on Material from Another Medium	Michael Weller	Nominated	
Academy Awards	Best Art Direction	Art Direction: John Graysmark, Patrizia Von Brandenstein, and Tony Reading; Set Decoration: George DeTitta Sr., George DeTitta Jr., and Peter Howitt	Nominated	
Academy Awards	Best Cinematography	Miroslav Ondříček	Nominated	
Academy Awards	Best Costume Design	Anna Hill Johnstone	Nominated	
Academy Awards	Best Original Score	Randy Newman	Nominated	
Academy Awards	Best Original Song	"One More Hour"; Music and Lyrics by Randy Newman	Nominated	
British Academy Film Awards	Best Original Song Written for a Film	"One More Hour"; Music and Lyrics by Randy Newman	Nominated	
Golden Globe Awards	Best Motion Picture – Drama	Ragtime	Nominated	
Golden Globe Awards	Best Actor in a Supporting Role – Motion Picture	Howard E. Rollins Jr.	Nominated	
Golden Globe Awards	Best Actress in a Supporting Role – Motion Picture	Mary Steenburgen	Nominated	
Golden Globe Awards	Best Director – Motion Picture	Miloš Forman	Nominated	
Golden Globe Awards	Best Original Song – Motion Picture	"One More Hour"; Music and Lyrics by Randy Newman	Nominated	
Golden Globe Awards	New Star of the Year	Howard E. Rollins Jr.	Nominated	
Golden Globe Awards	New Star of the Year	Elizabeth McGovern	Nominated	
Grammy Awards	Best Album of Original Score Written for a Motion Picture or Television Special	Randy Newman	Nominated	
Los Angeles Film Critics Association Awards	Best Music	Randy Newman	Won	
NAACP Image Awards	Outstanding Motion Picture	Ragtime	Nominated	
NAACP Image Awards	Outstanding Supporting Actor in a Motion Picture	Moses Gunn	Won	
New York Film Critics Circle Awards	Best Supporting Actor	Howard E. Rollins Jr.	4th Place	
Writers Guild of America Awards	Best Drama – Adapted from Another Medium	Michael Weller	Nominated	

=== Others ===
The film is recognized by American Film Institute in these lists:

- 2003: AFI's 100 Years...100 Heroes & Villains:
  - Coalhouse Walker Jr. – Nominated
- 2005: AFI's 100 Years of Film Scores – Nominated

== See also ==
- Ragtime – the Tony-winning musical adaptation
