= King of the Underworld (1939 film) =

1939 film

- Theatrical release poster
- Directed by: Lewis Seiler
- Written by: George Bricker; Vincent Sherman
- Screenplay by: George Bricker; Vincent Sherman
- Story by: W. R. Burnett
- Based on: Dr. Socrates; 1935 film by short story by W. R. Burnett
- Produced by: Bryan Foy
- Starring: Humphrey Bogart; Kay Francis
- Cinematography: Sidney Hickox
- Edited by: Frank DeWar
- Music by: Heinz Roemheld
- Production company: Warner Bros. Pictures
- Distributed by: Warner Bros. Pictures
- Release date: January 14, 1939
- Running time: 67 minutes
- Country: United States
- Language: English

King of the Underworld is a 1939 American crime drama film starring Humphrey Bogart as a gangster and Kay Francis as a doctor forced to treat him. It was directed by Lewis Seiler. It is a remake of the 1935 film Dr. Socrates, which was based on a short story by W. R. Burnett.

== Plot ==
Married doctors Niles and Carole Nelson save the life of a gangster shot in a gunfight. Joe Gurney, the patient's boss, gives Niles $500 as a reward, and suggests he take his "million dollar hands" uptown, where he can treat the rich. Niles takes his suggestion, but soon neglects his practice for his addiction: betting on the horses.

The doctor also starts treating Joe's gang without telling his wife. One night, he is called away to do just that. Suspicious, Carole follows him. When the police raid the gang's hideout, a shootout ensues and Niles is killed while Joe and his gang escape.

Though the district attorney has no case, he charges Carole with being guilty of being married to Niles just to put on a good show for the public. The corrupt trial ends in a hung jury, but her medical license remains at stake. She is given three months to prove her innocence or the license will be revoked. She relocates with her Aunt Josephine to a town, Wayne Center, where two of Joe's men have been jailed, hoping to get in touch with the gangster.

While on his way to free his men, Joe has a flat tire. He and his amateur gang initially suspects nearby wanderer Bill Stevens of having shot at him, but then a nail is extracted from the tire. When Bill mentions that he has written a book about the mistakes that brought about Napoleon's downfall, Joe becomes very interested, as he is a great admirer of the French dictator. He offers Bill a ride. Bill makes the mistake of accepting, and soon finds himself shot in the shoulder when Joe and his gang rescue their comrades from the sheriff. Bill is caught.

When local Doctor Sanders refuses to treat the alleged criminal, Carole extracts the bullet. However, Bill is unable to provide her any useful information about Joe. When Bill's claims are confirmed, he is released. He goes to thank Carole. Aunt Josephine persuades him to stay with them for a week to recuperate.

Joe has Bill kidnapped in the middle of the night so that he can ghostwrite Joe's autobiography. Joe likes Bill's suggestion for the title, Joe Gurney: the Napoleon of Crime, but Bill overhears his plan to kill him after the book is finished.

Carole is brought, blindfolded, to remove a bullet from Joe's arm, received during the rescue. Before being released, she is told that Bill will be killed if she alerts the authorities.

When Joe's wound gets worse, he sends for her again. He also complains about his eyes. Carole takes a sample to analyze at home. When she is warned that the sheriff and government men are coming to arrest her (a $100 bill Joe gave her was traced to a robbery), she devises a plan. She returns to Joe's hideout and tells him he has a serious infection, one that will make him go blind in six hours unless it is treated immediately with eye drops. She also insists the infection is so contagious she needs to treat all of the gang. Suspicious, Joe makes her administer the medicine to Bill first. Meanwhile, her aunt gives the police Joe's location, but begs them to wait until midnight to give the medication time to temporarily blind the recipients. The plan works. The blind gangsters return fire, but soon give themselves up. Joe tries to track Carole and Bill through the house, but is eventually gunned down by the police.

Bill becomes a successful writer, and he and Carole have a son.

== Cast ==
- Humphrey Bogart as Joe Gurney
- Kay Francis as Dr. Carole Nelson
- James Stephenson as Bill Stevens
- John Eldredge as Dr. Niles Nelson
- Jessie Busley as Aunt Josephine
- Arthur Aylesworth as Dr. Sanders
- Raymond Brown as Sheriff
- Harland Tucker as Mr. Ames
- Ralph Remley as Mr. Robert
- Charley Foy as Slick
- Murray Alper as Eddie
- Joe Devlin as Porky
- Elliott Sullivan as Mugsy
- Alan Davis as Pete
- John Harmon as Slats
- John Ridgely as Jerry
- Richard Bond as Interne
- Pierre Watkin as District Attorney
- Charles Trowbridge as Dr. Ryan
- Edwin Stanley as Dr. Jacobs (credited as Ed Stanley)
- Sidney Bracey as Bert, the Farmer (uncredited)
- Al Lloyd as Drug Store Clerk (uncredited)
- Mickey Kuhn as "Sonny" Stevens (uncredited)
