= Fred F. Finklehoffe =

American film producer

Fred Franklin Finklehoffe (February 16, 1910, Springfield, Massachusetts – October 5, 1977, Springtown, Pennsylvania) was an American film writer and producer. He was educated at Virginia Military Institute (V.M.I.) where he met his writing partner John Cherry Monks Jr. (both class of 1932).

== Biography ==
Monks and Finklefhoffe wrote a play set at VMI in 1936, "Brother Rat", which was adapted into a 1938 film of the same name. A 1940 film sequel entitled Brother Rat and a Baby was also produced. Monks and Finklehoffe also wrote the MGM musical, Strike Up the Band (1940).

Finklehoffe was nominated for the 1944 Academy Award for Best Adapted Screenplay with Irving Brecher for his work on Meet Me in St. Louis. He also wrote the scripts for a pair of Martin and Lewis comedy films, At War with the Army (1950) and The Stooge (1952).

== Personal life ==
Finklehoffe was married three times. His second wife was Scottish actress and singer Ella Logan, whom he married in 1942 until their divorce in 1954. They had no children. He married fashion model and consultant Carolyn Jo Phillips in 1956. They had one daughter and remained married until his death.
