= John Monks Jr. =

American dramatist (1910–2004)

John Cherry Monks Jr. (February 24, 1910 – December 10, 2004) was an American writer, actor, playwright, screenwriter, director, and a U.S. Marine.

== Biography ==
Monks was born in Pleasantville, New York. He attended the Virginia Military Institute (VMI) and became a stage actor. Together with a fellow former cadet Fred Finklehoffe, he co-wrote a play in 1936 titled Brother Rat. The success of the play led to Warner Bros. purchasing the play for filming at VMI. Warners engaged them to write the screenplay for the film and a sequel titled Brother Rat and a Baby. Monks also wrote Strike Up the Band (1940) and Dial 1119 (1950) for MGM.

In World War II, Monks was commissioned by the U.S. Marine Corps on his graduation from VMI. He met producer Louis de Rochemont and co-wrote We Are the Marines. Captain Monks served in the 3rd Marine Regiment during the Bougainville campaign and wrote an account of the Regiment in A Ribbon and a Star: The Third Marines At Bougainville, published in 1945.

Monks returned to civilian life writing the screenplays for several films, such as The House on 92nd Street (winning an Edgar Allan Poe Award), Knock on Any Door, The People Against O'Hara and later (with Richard Goldstone) writing, producing and directing No Man Is an Island (1962) about American sailor George Ray Tweed, who remained undetected on Guam from the Japanese invasion to the American recapture.

After a long absence from the cinema, Monks made several appearances as an actor, beginning with Sylvester Stallone's Paradise Alley (1978).

He died in Pacific Palisades, California.

== Filmography ==
Year	Title	Role	Notes
1978	Paradise Alley	Mickey the Bartender	
1980	The Gong Show Movie	Tourist Man	
1981	Early Warning	Plumber	(final film role)
