= Thank You, Jeeves! =

1936 film by Arthur Greville Collins

Thank You, Jeeves
- Directed by: Arthur Greville Collins
- Written by: Stephen Gross; Joseph Hoffman
- Produced by: Sol M. Wurtzel
- Starring: Arthur Treacher; Virginia Field; David Niven; Lester Matthews; Colin Tapley; John Graham Spacey
- Cinematography: Barney McGill
- Edited by: Nick DeMaggio
- Music by: Samuel Kaylin
- Distributed by: 20th Century-Fox
- Release date: October 4, 1936
- Running time: 57 minutes
- Country: United States
- Language: English

Thank You, Jeeves! is a 1936 American comedy film directed by Arthur Greville Collins, written by Stephen Gross and Joseph Hoffman, and starring Arthur Treacher, Virginia Field, David Niven, Lester Matthews, Colin Tapley and John Graham Spacey. It was released on October 4, 1936, by 20th Century-Fox.

== Plot ==
Bertie Wooster is a frivolous fop, whose insistence on planning a holiday in the French seaside resort of Deauville prompts his erudite manservant Jeeves to give his notice, declaring he will leave in the morning as he is tired of extricating Bertie from disastrous holiday romances. That night, as heavy rain falls, a mysterious young woman enters Bertie's London flat, carrying half of some secret plans. Bertie immediately has amorous intentions, but Jeeves locks him out of the living room, where the woman is resting. Bertie discovers the woman has a room booked at a country hotel, Mooring Manor. The woman leaves the house under the cover of darkness, to elude two men who are waiting for her outside. The following morning, Bertie and Jeeves set out for Mooring Manor, where they must do battle with criminals posing as Scotland Yard detectives. On the way to the hotel, they pick up a hitch-hiker, a black saxophonist, who later helps them to foil the crooks.

== Cast ==
The film was Niven's first leading role, although he received only third billing after Treacher and Field.

- Arthur Treacher as Jeeves
- Virginia Field as Marjorie Lowman
- David Niven as Bertie Wooster
- Lester Matthews as Elliott Manville
- Colin Tapley as Tom Brock
- John Graham Spacey as Jack Stone
- Ernie Stanton as Mr. Snelling
- Gene Reynolds as Bobby Smith
- Douglas Walton as Edward McDermott
- Willie Best as Drowsy

== Wodehouse vs. the screenplay ==
Although the film bears the same title as one of P.G. Wodehouse's novels, and the two leading characters are Jeeves (played by Treacher) and Bertie Wooster (Niven), the screenplay by Stephen Gross and Joseph Hoffman bears no similarity to any Wodehouse novel. In a letter to his friend Guy Bolton, written many years later (15 August 1973), Wodehouse wrote, "They didn't use a word of my story, substituting another written by some studio hack."

== Critical reception ==
The New York Times praised the casting of Niven and Treacher, noting: "Mr Wodehouse must have been one of the fates in attendance at their births, marking them to play the characters he has been writing about these many years." Although it received critical plaudits, it was a B-movie, so it was not widely distributed, being played only as a second feature in selected American cities. It was not screened in the UK because the British government at that time imposed a strict quota on imported films, which meant that B-movies were not shown.

Wodehouse was not impressed by Treacher's performance as Jeeves, complaining that he "pulled faces all the time. Awful." He added, "that supercilious manner of his is all wrong for Jeeves."

Hollywood film archivist and writer Brian Taves, in his book P.G. Wodehouse and Hollywood: Screenwriting, Satires and Adaptations (2006), gave a scathing critique of Thank You, Jeeves! He wrote, "there was scarcely a mistake that was not made in its 56 minutes", adding the humor was forced, and the direction lackluster and unimaginative. Taves claimed the film "so utterly fails in its essential purpose that it is easy to watch the whole picture without so much as cracking a smile." He was particularly critical of the inclusion of black comedian Willie Best as Drowsy the hitch-hiking saxophonist, declaring his scenes represent "the worst type of Hollywood racial humor during the 1930s".

== Television release ==
The film was re-edited for television in 1955, and broadcast in the series TV Hour of the Stars, under the title Thank You, Mr Jeeves.

== Sequel ==
A sequel, Step Lively, Jeeves!, was released by 20th Century Fox in 1937 with Treacher reprising his role of Jeeves, but without the character of Bertie Wooster. This was because Niven was at the time under contract to Samuel Goldwyn, who typically loaned him out only for a single picture, hence it would have been expensive and difficult to hire him for the sequel. Niven would not appear in another Wodehouse adaptation until he played the titular character in "Uncle Fred Flits By", an episode of Four Star Playhouse, in 1955.
