= The Gay Lady =

The Gay Lady may refer to:

- The Gay Lady (1929 film), American musical, directed by Robert Florey and starring Gertrude Lawrence
- The Gay Lady (1935 film), British title for American film Lady Tubbs, directed by Alan Crosland and starring Alice Brady
- The Gay Lady (1949 film), American title for British film Trottie True, directed by Brian Desmond Hurst and starring Jean Kent
