= Arthur Treacher =

English actor (1894–1975)

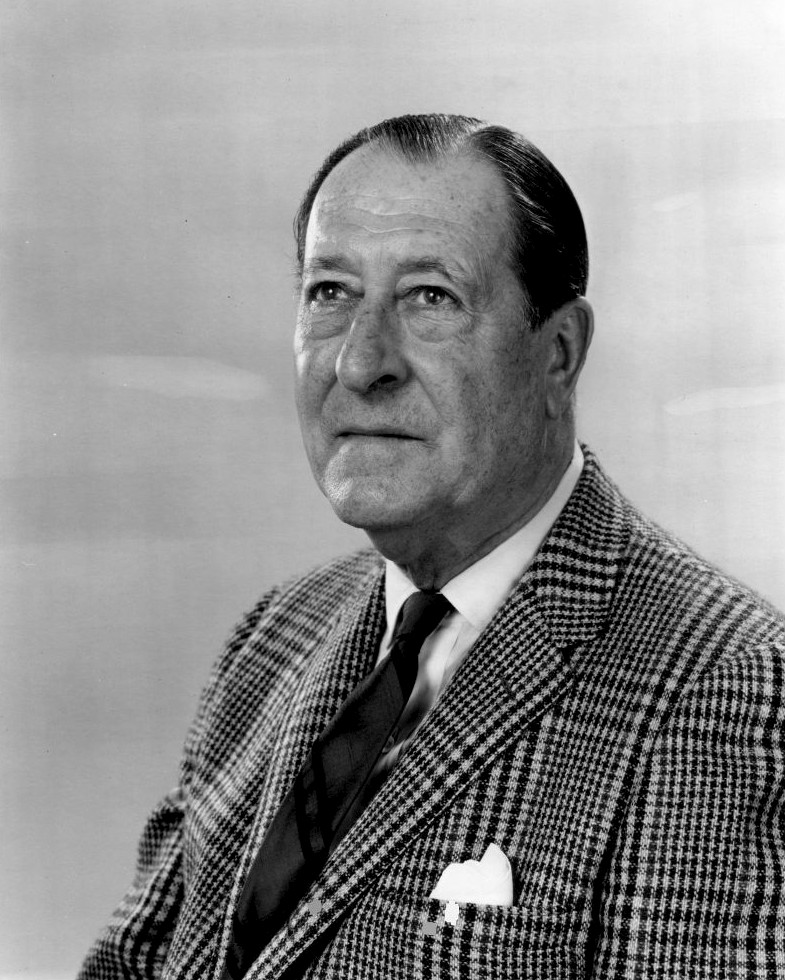
- Treacher in 1968
- Born: Arthur Veary Treacher, Jr. 23 July 1894; Brighton, East Sussex, England
- Died: 14 December 1975 (aged 81); Manhasset, New York, U.S.
- Occupation: Actor
- Years active: 1926–1970
- Spouse: Virginia J. Taylor (m. 1940) (1901–1984)

Arthur Veary Treacher, Jr. (/ˈtriːtʃər/ TREE-chər; 23 July 1894 – 14 December 1975) was an English film and stage actor active from the 1920s to the 1960s, and known for playing English types, especially butler and manservant roles, such as the P. G. Wodehouse valet character Jeeves (Thank You, Jeeves!, 1936) and the kind butlers opposite Shirley Temple in Curly Top (1935) and Heidi (1937). In the 1960s, he became well known on American television as an announcer and sidekick to talk show host Merv Griffin, and as the support character Constable Jones in Disney's Mary Poppins (1964). He lent his name to the Arthur Treacher's Fish and Chips chain of restaurants.

== Personal life ==
Treacher was the son of Arthur Veary Treacher (1862–1924), a Sussex solicitor; his mother was Alice Mary Longhurst (1865–1946). He was educated at Uppingham School (Uppingham, Rutland). In 1940, he married Virginia Taylor (1898–1984).

== Acting career ==
Treacher was a veteran of World War I, serving as an officer of the Royal Garrison Artillery; his father had served with the Sussex Volunteer Artillery before Treacher's birth. After the war, he established an acting career in England, and in March 1926, he went to New York City as part of a musical-comedy revue named Great Temptations. He was featured in the 1930 Billy Rose musical revue Sweet and Low.

He began his movie career in 1929, in the Paramount Pictures feature The Battle of Paris (filmed in New York and released in November 1930). He did not resume his motion-picture work until 1933, in Hollywood. Unlike many screen actors who were signed to exclusive contracts with major studios, Treacher freelanced among various studios, usually cast as upper-crust Englishmen. He was cast as an English butler in Fashions of 1934, and this typecast him in servant roles. He portrayed P. G. Wodehouse's valet character Jeeves in the movies Thank You, Jeeves! (1936) and Step Lively, Jeeves! (1937). (Wodehouse, however, was unhappy with the way his work had been adapted, and refused to authorize any further Jeeves movies.) Treacher played a valet or butler in several other movies, including Personal Maid's Secret, Mr. Cinderella, Bordertown, and In Society. He was caricatured in the 1941 cartoon Hollywood Steps Out.

Treacher was featured in four Shirley Temple movies: Curly Top (1935), Stowaway (1936), Heidi (1937), and The Little Princess (1939). The movie scenes were intentionally scripted to have the 6' 4" Treacher standing or dancing side by side with the tiny child actress; for example, in The Little Princess, they sing and dance together to an old song "Knocked 'em in the Old Kent Road".

In 1950, Treacher had a program on WNBC Radio in New York City. As a disc jockey, he played and commented on recordings of music by Gilbert and Sullivan on the show. He also appeared as a guest commentator on the NBC network's hot-jazz radio series The Chamber Music Society of Lower Basin Street.

== Later years and death ==
During 1961 and 1962, William Gaxton and he appeared in Guy Lombardo's production of the musical revue Paradise Island, which played at the Jones Beach Marine Theater. In 1962, he replaced Robert Coote as King Pellinore (with over-the-title name billing) in the original Broadway production of Lerner and Loewe's musical play Camelot, and he remained with the show through the Chicago engagement and post-Broadway tour that ended during August 1964.

From the mid-1950s on, Treacher became a familiar figure on American television as a guest on talk shows and panel games, including The Tonight Show and The Garry Moore Show. In early 1961, Treacher appeared in episode 463 of the TV game show I've Got a Secret in which he rode a horse on stage. In 1964, Treacher was cast in the role of Constable Jones in the hugely successful Walt Disney movie Mary Poppins. That same year, he played the role of stuffy English butler Arthur Pinckney in two episodes of The Beverly Hillbillies. Pinckney mistakenly believed the hillbillies were the domestic servants of the family by whom he was hired, while the hillbillies believed Pinckney was a boarder at their Beverly Hills mansion.

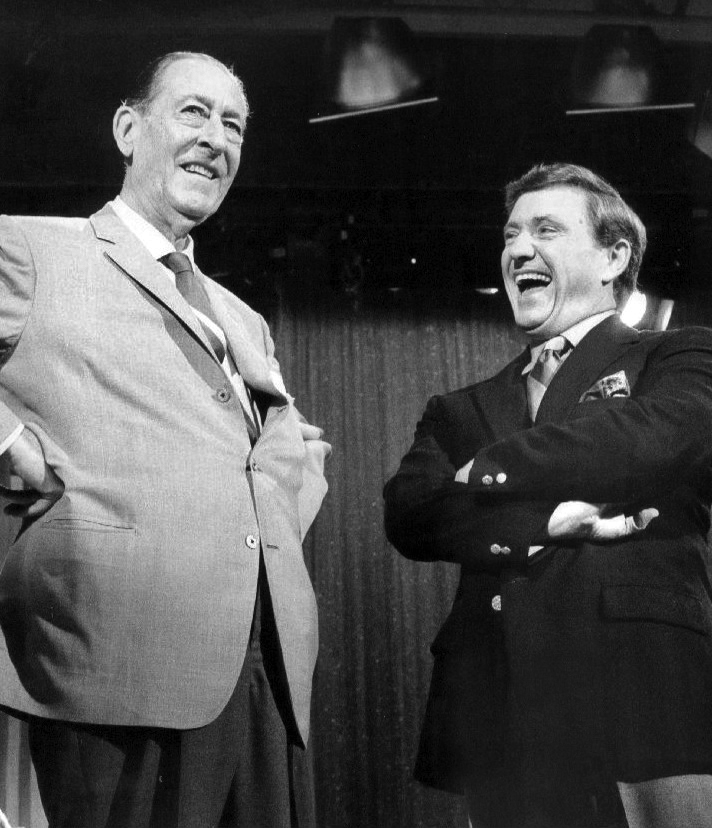
Treacher and Merv Griffin on Griffin's CBS talk show, 1969.

He became better known to American television audiences when talk-show host Merv Griffin made him announcer and occasional bantering partner on The Merv Griffin Show from 1965 to 1970 ("...and now, here's the dear boy himself, Merrr-vyn!"). In 1966, Treacher and Merv Griffin recorded an album together under the soubriquet 'Alf & 'Alf entitled Songs of the British Music Hall. When in 1969 Griffin switched from syndication to the CBS network, CBS executives insisted that Treacher was too old for the show, but Griffin fought to keep Treacher and eventually won. However, when Griffin relocated his show from New York City to Los Angeles the next year, Treacher stayed behind, telling Griffin, "at my age, I don't want to move, especially to someplace that shakes!"

During this period of latter-day popularity, Treacher capitalized on his name recognition through the use of his name and image for such franchised business concerns as the Call Arthur Treacher Service System (a household help agency) and Arthur Treacher's Fish and Chips. The restaurants became very popular during the 1970s and increased to nearly 900 outlets, although in interviews, Treacher would refuse to confirm or deny that he had any ownership stake in the company. (Only one free-standing Arthur Treacher's was still in existence by 2022, located in Cuyahoga Falls, Ohio. Several attached Arthur Treacher's franchise locations are still operating out of Salvatore's Pizzeria locations in Rochester, New York and one continues to operate out of the Twin Oaks Convenience Store in Pomeroy, Ohio).

Treacher died at the age of 81 from cardiovascular disease on 14 December 1975.

== Filmography ==
- The Battle of Paris (1929) – Harry
- Fashions of 1934 (1934) – the Duchess' Butler (uncredited)
- Gambling Lady (1934) – Pryor (uncredited)
- Riptide (1934) – Reporter (uncredited)
- Viva Villa! (1934) – English Reporter (scenes deleted)
- Hollywood Party (1934) – Durante's Butler (uncredited)
- The Key (1934) – Lt. Merriman, Furlong's Aide
- Here Comes the Groom (1934) – Butler
- Madame Du Barry (1934) – Andre, Master of the Bedroom
- Student Tour (1934) – British Radio Announcer (uncredited)
- Desirable (1934) – Butler (uncredited)
- The Captain Hates the Sea (1934) – Major Warringforth
- Forsaking All Others (1934) – Johnson – Dill's Butler (uncredited)
- Bordertown (1935) – Roberts – Elwell's Butler (uncredited)
- David Copperfield (1935) – Donkey Man (uncredited)
- The Winning Ticket (1935) – Horse Race Announcer (uncredited)
- The Woman in Red (1935) – Major Albert Casserly (uncredited)
- Let's Live Tonight (1935) – Ozzy Featherstone
- Cardinal Richelieu (1935) – Agitator
- Go Into Your Dance (1935) – Latimer (uncredited)
- The Nitwits (1935) – Man with Tennis Equipment (uncredited)
- No More Ladies (1935) – Lord Knowleton
- Going Highbrow (1935) – Waiter
- The Daring Young Man (1935) – Col. Baggott
- Curly Top (1935) – Butler
- Bright Lights (1935) – Wilbur
- Orchids to You (1935) – Roger Morton
- I Live My Life (1935) – Gallup, Mrs. Gage's Butler
- A Midsummer Night's Dream (1935) – Epilogue
- Personal Maid's Secret (1935) – Owen
- Remember Last Night? (1935) – Phelps
- Splendor (1935) – Major Ballinger
- Hitch Hike Lady (1935) – Mortimer Wingate
- Magnificent Obsession (1935) – Horace
- Anything Goes (1936) – Sir Evelyn Oakleigh
- Hearts Divided (1936) – Sir Harry
- Satan Met a Lady (1936) – Anthony Travers
- The Case Against Mrs. Ames (1936) – Griggsby
- Thank You, Jeeves! (1936) – Jeeves
- Mr. Cinderella (1936) – Watkins, Randolph's Butler
- Under Your Spell (1936) – Botts
- Stowaway (1936) – Atkins
- Step Lively, Jeeves! (1937) – Jeeves
- Thin Ice (1937) – Nottingham
- She Had to Eat (1937) – Carter
- You Can't Have Everything (1937) – Bevins
- Heidi (1937) – Andrews
- Mad About Music (1938) – Tripps
- My Lucky Star (1938) – Whipple
- Always in Trouble (1938) – Rogers
- Up the River (1938) – Darby Randall
- The Little Princess (1939) – Bertie Minchin
- Bridal Suite (1939) – Lord Helfer
- Barricade (1939) – Upton Ward
- Brother Rat and a Baby (1940) – Snelling
- Irene (1940) – Bretherton
- Star Spangled Rhythm (1942) – "Sweater, Sarong, and Peekaboo Bang" number
- Forever and a Day (1943) – Second Air Raid Watcher
- The Amazing Mrs. Holliday (1943) – Henderson
- Chip Off the Old Block (1944) – Quentin
- In Society (1944) – Pipps
- National Velvet (1944) – Race Patron
- Delightfully Dangerous (1945) – Jeffers
- Swing Out, Sister (1945) – Chumley
- That's the Spirit (1945) – Masters
- Fun on a Weekend (1947) – Benjamin O. Moffatt
- Slave Girl (1947) – Thomas 'Liverpool' Griswold
- The Countess of Monte Cristo (1948) – Hotel Managing Director
- That Midnight Kiss (1949) – Hutchins
- Love That Brute (1950) – Quentin, Hanley's Butler
- Mary Poppins (1964) – Constable Jones (final film role)
