= Here Comes the Groom (1934 film) =

1934 film by Edward Sedgwick

- Directed by: Edward Sedgwick
- Screenplay by: Richard Flournoy; Casey Robinson
- Produced by: Charles R. Rogers
- Starring: Jack Haley; Mary Boland; Neil Hamilton; Patricia Ellis; Isabel Jewell; Lawrence Gray; Sidney Toler
- Cinematography: Henry Sharp; Milton R. Krasner
- Music by: Herman Hand
- Production company: Paramount Pictures
- Distributed by: Paramount Pictures
- Release date: June 22, 1934
- Running time: 66 minutes
- Country: United States
- Language: English

Here Comes the Groom is a 1934 American Pre-Code comedy film directed by Edward Sedgwick and written by Richard Flournoy and Casey Robinson. The film stars Jack Haley, Mary Boland, Neil Hamilton, Patricia Ellis, Isabel Jewell, Lawrence Gray and Sidney Toler. The film was released on June 22, 1934, by Paramount Pictures.

The film is about a piccolo player who "poses as a crooner." The film's sets were designed by the art director David S. Garber.

== Cast ==
- Jack Haley as Mike Scanlon
- Mary Boland as Mrs. Widden
- Neil Hamilton as Jim
- Patricia Ellis as Patricia Randolph
- Isabel Jewell as Angy
- Lawrence Gray as Marvin Hale
- Sidney Toler as Detective Weaver
- E. H. Calvert as George Randolph
- James P. Burtis as 1st Cop
- Ward Bond as Second Cop
- James Farley as Third Cop
- Fred Toones as Porter
- Arthur Treacher as Butler
- Ernie Adams as 1st Gunman
- Eddie Sturgis as 2nd Gunman
