= Down the Stretch (1936 film) =

1936 film by William Clemens

- Theatrical release poster
- Directed by: William Clemens
- Screenplay by: William Jacobs
- Story by: William Jacobs
- Produced by: Bryan Foy
- Starring: Patricia Ellis; Mickey Rooney; Dennis Moore; Willie Best; Gordon Hart; Wild Bill Elliott
- Cinematography: Arthur L. Todd
- Edited by: Louis Hesse
- Music by: Howard Jackson
- Production company: Warner Bros. Pictures
- Distributed by: Warner Bros. Pictures
- Release date: September 18, 1936
- Running time: 66 minutes
- Country: United States
- Language: English

Down the Stretch is a 1936 American sports drama film directed by William Clemens and written by William Jacobs. The film stars Patricia Ellis, Mickey Rooney, Dennis Moore, Willie Best, Gordon Hart and Wild Bill Elliott. The film was released by Warner Bros. Pictures on September 18, 1936.

== Plot ==
Snapper Sinclair's father once rode for stable owners Patricia and Cliff Barrington, but later was found to have thrown races and was banned from the track. To keep Snapper from being sent to reform school, Patricia offers him a job.

A fast but untamed horse called Faithful quickly becomes Snapper's favorite. He wins races as its jockey, but when he refuses to throw one for gamblers, they reveal publicly who Snapper's father was and suspicion falls on Snapper, who is no longer allowed any mounts.

He leaves for England, where he becomes a very successful rider. One day the Barringtons are there to enter Faithful in a race. Snapper discovers that they are nearly broke. He deliberately loses the race so that Faithful can win. Not sure where to turn next, Snapper is pleased when the Barringtons invite him to come back home.

== Cast ==
- Patricia Ellis as Patricia Barrington
- Mickey Rooney as 'Snapper' Sinclair, aka Fred St. Clair
- Dennis Moore as Cliff Barrington
- Willie Best as Noah
- Gordon Hart as Judge Adams
- Wild Bill Elliott as Robert Bates
- Virginia Brissac as Aunt Julia
- Charles C. Wilson as Tex Reardon
- Joseph Crehan as Secretary C.D. Burch
- Mary Treen as Nurse
- Robert Emmett Keane as Nick
- Charley Foy as Arnold Roach
- Crauford Kent as Sir Oliver Martin

== See also ==
- List of films about horses
- List of films about horse racing
