= Hold 'Em Yale (1935 film) =

1935 film by Sidney Lanfield

- Theatrical release poster
- Directed by: Sidney Lanfield
- Screenplay by: Damon Runyon; Paul Gerard Smith; Eddie Welch
- Produced by: Charles R. Rogers
- Starring: Patricia Ellis; Cesar Romero; Buster Crabbe; William Frawley; Andy Devine; George Barbier
- Cinematography: Milton R. Krasner
- Edited by: Jack Dennis
- Production company: Paramount Pictures
- Distributed by: Paramount Pictures
- Release date: April 27, 1935
- Running time: 61 minutes
- Country: United States
- Language: English

Hold 'Em Yale is a 1935 American comedy film directed by Sidney Lanfield and written by Damon Runyon, Paul Gerard Smith, and Eddie Welch. The film stars Patricia Ellis, Cesar Romero, Buster Crabbe, William Frawley, Andy Devine, and George Barbier; it was released on April 27, 1935, by Paramount Pictures.

== Plot ==
A racketeer known as "Sunshine Joe" specializes in ticket scalping. His gang of colorfully nicknamed thugs includes Liverlips, Sam the Gonoph, and Bennie South Street, as well as Georgie the Chaser, who was dubbed that because of his penchant for chasing after women.

On a train, Georgie happens upon Clarice Van Cleve, an heiress who loves to fall in love, particularly with men in uniform. This has created many a headache for her father, who already has seen Clarice elope three times with military types, each ending badly.

Mr. Van Cleve diverts his daughter to a New Jersey health resort, where he introduces her to his friend Mr. Wilmot and handsome son Hector, in the hope that Clarice and Hector will hit it off. Georgie the gigolo still has Clarice's eye, however, pretending to be a combat pilot. When Clarice turns up and begins acting like a homemaker, though, driving him crazy, Georgie, learning she has been disinherited by her dad, leaves by claiming he is needed by "the King" to fly a mission.

Sunshine Joe runs off with money earned from scalped tickets to the Harvard–Yale college football game. As Hector is a member of the Yale team, all of Joe's goons travel to New Haven, Connecticut, for the game and place bets. Shocked to find Hector is a benchwarmer, they intimidate the coach with a gun and demand that Hector be permitted to play. He kicks a field goal to win the game, which results in him, a man in another kind of uniform, in the arms of Clarice.

== Cast ==
- Patricia Ellis as Clarice Van Cleve
- Cesar Romero as Georgie "Gigolo Georgie"
- Buster Crabbe as Hector Wilmot
- William Frawley as Sunshine Joe
- Andy Devine as Liverlips
- George Barbier as Mr. Van Cleve
- Warren Hymer as Sam The Gonoph
- George E. Stone as Bennie South Street
- Hale Hamilton as Mr. Wilmot
- Guy Usher as Coach Jennings

== See also ==
- List of American football films
