= Isabel Jewell =

American actress (1907–1972)

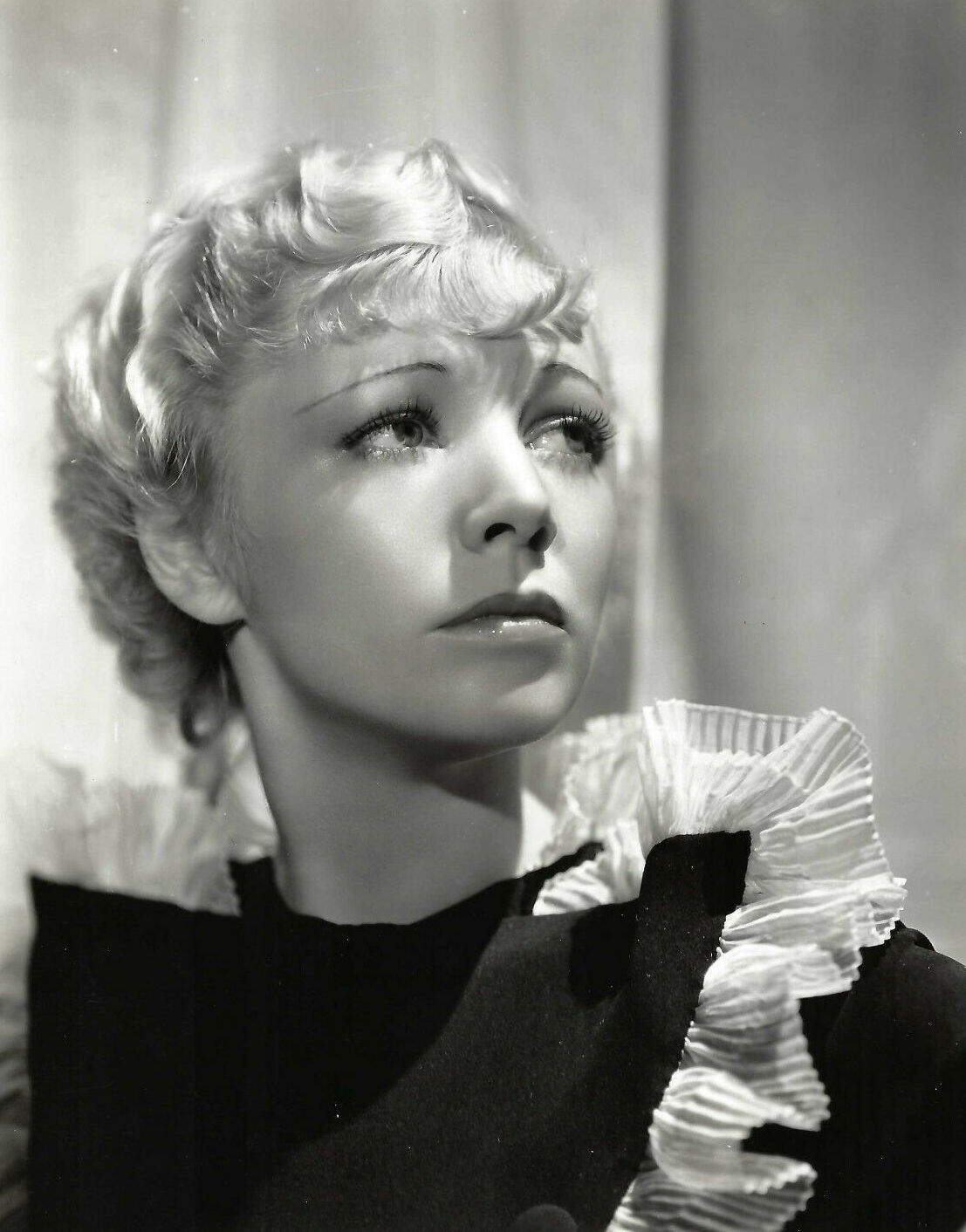
- Jewell in 1933 by Clarence Sinclair Bull
- Born: July 19, 1907; Shoshoni, Wyoming, U.S.
- Died: April 5, 1972 (aged 64); Los Angeles, California, U.S.
- Other names: Isabel Jewel; Isobel Jewell
- Occupation: Actress
- Years active: 1932–1972
- Spouses: Lovell "Cowboy" Underwood (m. 1927; div. 19??); Owen Crump (m. 1939; div. 1941) Paul Marion (m. 1941; div. 1944)

Isabel Jewell (July 19, 1907 – April 5, 1972) was an American actress, who rose to prominence in the 1930s and early 1940s. Some of her more famous films were Ceiling Zero, Marked Woman, A Tale of Two Cities, Lost Horizon, and Gone with the Wind.

== Early life ==
Jewell was born in Shoshoni, Wyoming, on July 19, 1907, the daughter of Emory Lee Jewell and Livia A. Willoughby Jewell. Her father was "a prominent...doctor and medical researcher." She was educated at St. Mary's Academy in Minnesota and at Hamilton College in Kentucky.

== Career ==
After years in theatre stock companies, including an 87-week stint in Lincoln, Nebraska, she got a part on Broadway in Up Pops the Devil (1930). She received glowing critical reviews for Blessed Event (1932) as well.

Jewell's film debut came in Blessed Event (1932) and was followed by supporting roles in other pre-Code classics like Jean Harlow's Bombshell (1933) and Design for Living (1933) from Ernst Lubitsch. She had been brought to Hollywood by Warner Brothers for the film version of Up Pops the Devil (1931). Jewell gained other supporting roles, appearing in a variety of films in the early 1930s. She played stereotypical gangsters' women in such films as Manhattan Melodrama (1934) and Marked Woman (1937). She was well-received playing against type as the seamstress sentenced to death on the guillotine with Sydney Carton (Ronald Colman) in A Tale of Two Cities (1935). She later co-starred with Colman in Lost Horizon as Gloria, the terminally-ill prostitute. Her most significant role was Sally Bates in She Had to Choose. Other films included Gone with the Wind (1939) (in the role of "that white trash, Emmy Slattery"), Northwest Passage (1940), High Sierra (1941), and in two psychological horror films from producer Val Lewton, The Leopard Man (1943) and The Seventh Victim (1943).

Jewel had a memorable supporting role as Laury Palmer in the film noir Born to Kill (1947), but by the end of the 1940s, her roles had reduced in significance to the degree that her performances often were uncredited, e.g. The Snake Pit. She performed in radio dramas in the 1950s, including This Is Your FBI.

In the 1950s and 60s, Jewell took occasional roles on television. In February 1965, she played Madame Ahr, a member of a bank-robbing circus troupe, in an episode of Gunsmoke entitled "Circus Trick."

In 1972, Jewell appeared opposite Edie Sedgwick in the film Ciao! Manhattan. Her final film was the B movie Sweet Kill (1973) starring Tab Hunter, the directorial debut of Curtis Hanson.

== Personal life ==
Jewell's first marriage (which "was not generally known during Jewell's lifetime...[nor] mentioned in the press during her heyday in American films") occurred when she wed Lovell "Cowboy" Underwood when she was 19. In the mid to late 1930s, Jewell was seen at nightclubs with actor William Hopper. In 1936, she was engaged to actor Owen Crump, marrying in 1939 and divorcing in 1941. In 1941, Jewell married actor Paul Marion, who was then a private in the United States Army. They separated in 1943, and were divorced on May 12, 1944.

== Death ==
Jewell committed suicide by taking an overdose of barbiturates in Los Angeles, California, on April 5, 1972, aged 64. She was cremated and her ashes were scattered in the Pacific Ocean.

== Legacy ==
In 1960, Jewell was recognized with a star on the Hollywood Walk of Fame for her contribution to motion pictures. The star is located at 1560 Vine Street.

== Filmography ==
Complete filmography
| Year | Title | Role | Notes |
|---|---|---|---|
| 1931 | The Week End Mystery | Miss Keith | Short |
| 1932 | Blessed Event | Dorothy Lane | Uncredited |
| 1933 | The Crime of the Century | Bridge Player | Uncredited |
| 1933 | Bondage | Beulah | |
| 1933 | Beauty for Sale | Hortense | Credited as Isobel Jewell |
| 1933 | Bombshell | Lily | Credited as Isobel Jewell |
| 1933 | Day of Reckoning | Kate Lovett | |
| 1933 | Design for Living | Plunkett's Stenographer | |
| 1933 | Advice to the Lovelorn | Rose | |
| 1933 | The Women in His Life | Catherine "Cathy" Watson | |
| 1933 | Counsellor at Law | Bessie Green | |
| 1934 | Men in White | | Scenes cut |
| 1934 | Let's Be Ritzy | Betty | |
| 1934 | Manhattan Melodrama | Annabelle | |
| 1934 | Here Comes the Groom | Angy | |
| 1934 | She Had to Choose | Sally Bates | |
| 1934 | Evelyn Prentice | Judith Wilson | |
| 1935 | Shadow of Doubt | Inez "Johnny" Johnson | |
| 1935 | I've Been Around | Sally Van Loan | |
| 1935 | Times Square Lady | 'Babe' Sweeney | |
| 1935 | The Casino Murder Case | Amelia Llewellyn | |
| 1935 | Mad Love | Marianne | Scenes cut |
| 1935 | A Tale of Two Cities | Seamstress | |
| 1936 | Ceiling Zero | Lou Clarke | |
| 1936 | Dancing Feet | Mabel Henry | |
| 1936 | The Leathernecks Have Landed | Brooklyn | |
| 1936 | Big Brown Eyes | Bessie Blair | |
| 1936 | Small Town Girl | Emily 'Em' Brannan | |
| 1936 | 36 Hours to Kill | Jeanie Benson | |
| 1936 | The Man Who Lived Twice | Peggy Russell | |
| 1936 | Valiant Is the Word for Carrie | Lilli Eipper | |
| 1936 | Go West, Young Man | Gladys | |
| 1936 | Career Woman | Gracie Clay | |
| 1937 | Lost Horizon | Gloria Stone | |
| 1937 | Marked Woman | Emmy Lou Eagan | |
| 1937 | Love on Toast | Belle Huntley | |
| 1938 | Swing It, Sailor! | Myrtle Montrose | |
| 1938 | The Crowd Roars | Mrs. Martin | |
| 1939 | They Asked for It | Molly Herkimer | |
| 1939 | Missing Daughters | Peggy | |
| 1939 | Gone with the Wind | Emmy Slattery | |
| 1940 | Oh Johnny, How You Can Love | Gertie | |
| 1940 | Northwest Passage | Jennie Coit | |
| 1940 | Irene | Jane McGee | |
| 1940 | Babies for Sale | Edith Drake | |
| 1940 | Scatterbrain | Esther Harrington | |
| 1940 | Marked Men | Linda Harkness | |
| 1940 | Little Men | Stella | |
| 1941 | High Sierra | Blonde | |
| 1941 | For Beauty's Sake | Amy Devore | |
| 1943 | The Leopard Man | Maria | |
| 1943 | The Seventh Victim | Frances Fallon | |
| 1943 | Danger! Women at Work | Marie | |
| 1943 | The Falcon and the Co-eds | Mary Phoebus | |
| 1944 | The Merry Monahans | Rose Monahan | |
| 1945 | Steppin' in Society | Jenny the Juke | |
| 1945 | Sensation Hunters | Mae | |
| 1946 | Badman's Territory | Belle Starr | |
| 1947 | Born to Kill | Laury Palmer | |
| 1947 | The Bishop's Wife | Hysterical Mother | |
| 1948 | Michael O'Halloran | Laura Nelson | |
| 1948 | The Snake Pit | Inmate | Uncredited |
| 1948 | Unfaithfully Yours | First Telephone Operator | Uncredited |
| 1948 | Belle Starr's Daughter | Belle Starr | |
| 1949 | The Story of Molly X | Mrs. Mack | Uncredited |
| 1953 | Man in the Attic | Katy | |
| 1954 | Drum Beat | Lily White | |
| 1957 | Bernardine | Mrs. McDuff | |
| 1972 | Sweet Kill | Mrs. Cole | |
| 1972 | Ciao! Manhattan | Mummy | |

Partial television credits
| Year | Series | Role | Episode |
|---|---|---|---|
| 1952 | The Adventures of Kit Carson | Mary Barker | "The Trap" |
| 1952 | The Unexpected | Sister | "One for the Money" |
| 1952 | Mr. & Mrs. North | Anne Noble | "The Nobles" |
| 1952 | Fireside Theatre | | "The Boxer and the Stranger" |
| 1953 | Fireside Theatre | | "The Twelfth Juror" |
| 1955 | Treasury Men in Action | | "The Case of the Lady in Hiding" |
| 1956 | Dr. Christian | Mae | "Insurance Policy" |
| 1957 | Climax! | Actress | " Murder Has a Deadline" |
| 1961 | The Aquanauts | Miss Port | "The Defective Tank Adventure" |
| 1961 | Lock Up | | "Planter's Death" |
| 1962 | The Untouchables | Sophie | "The Night They Shot Santa Claus" |
| 1964 | Kraft Suspense Theatre | Mrs. Lyons | "The Gun" |
| 1965 | Gunsmoke | Mme. Ahr | "Circus Trick" |
| 1967 | Judd, for the Defense | Geraldine Hull | "Citizen Ritter" |
