= Johnny Carson =

American comedian and television host (1925–2005)

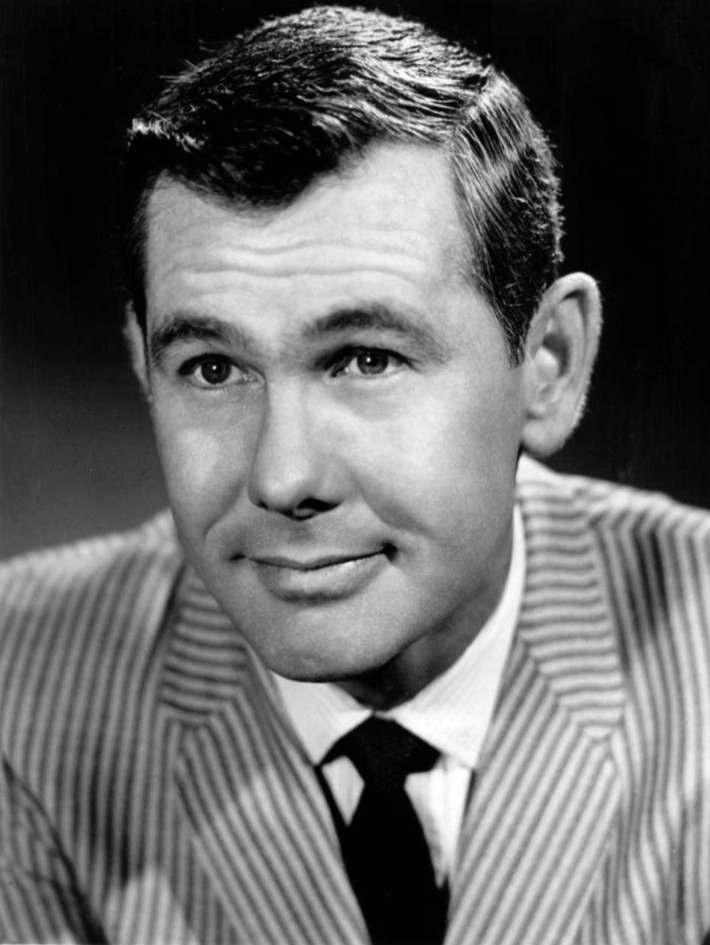
- Carson in 1965
- Born: John William Carson; October 23, 1925; Corning, Iowa, U.S.
- Died: January 23, 2005 (aged 79); Los Angeles, California, U.S.
- Education: University of Nebraska (BA)
- Spouses: Jody Morrill Wolcott (m. 1949; div. 1963) Joanne Copeland (m. 1963; div. 1972) Joanna Holland (m. 1972; div. 1985) Alexis Maas (m. 1987)
- Children: 3
- Relatives: Dick Carson (brother)

Comedy career
- Years active: 1950–1994
- Medium: Television
- Genres: Observational comedy; surreal humor; satire; deadpan; sketch comedy
- Subjects: American culture; American politics; everyday life; pop culture; current events; human behavior; social awkwardness; gender differences
- Military career
- Allegiance: United States
- Branch: United States Navy
- Service years: 1943–1945
- Rank: Ensign
- Conflicts: World War II; Pacific War
- Website: johnnycarson.com

John William Carson (October 23, 1925 – January 23, 2005) was an American television host, comedian, and writer. He was best known as the host of The Tonight Show Starring Johnny Carson, the third installment of The Tonight Show, which aired on NBC from 1962 to 1992. He remained an American cultural icon even after his retirement that year and is widely regarded as the King of Late Night Television.

Born in Corning, Iowa, Carson was raised in Norfolk, Nebraska, graduating from Norfolk High School. During World War II, Carson served in the United States Navy. After the war, Carson graduated from the University of Nebraska with a Bachelor of Arts. Carson began his career in radio and local television in Omaha, Nebraska and then went on to work in a variety of programs televised throughout the United States before taking over as host of the late-night talk show Tonight from Jack Paar in 1962. As host of the program, he became a cultural phenomenon while adopting a casual, conversational approach with extensive interaction with guests. This approach had been pioneered by Arthur Godfrey and previous Tonight Show hosts Paar and Steve Allen, but was enhanced by Carson's lightning-quick wit.

In a career spanning four decades, Carson received six Primetime Emmy Awards, the Television Academy's 1980 Governor's Award, and a 1985 Peabody Award. He was inducted into the Television Academy Hall of Fame in 1987. Carson was awarded the Presidential Medal of Freedom in 1992 and received a Kennedy Center Honor in 1993. Former late-night host and friend David Letterman, as well as many others, have cited Carson's influence.

== Early life and career ==
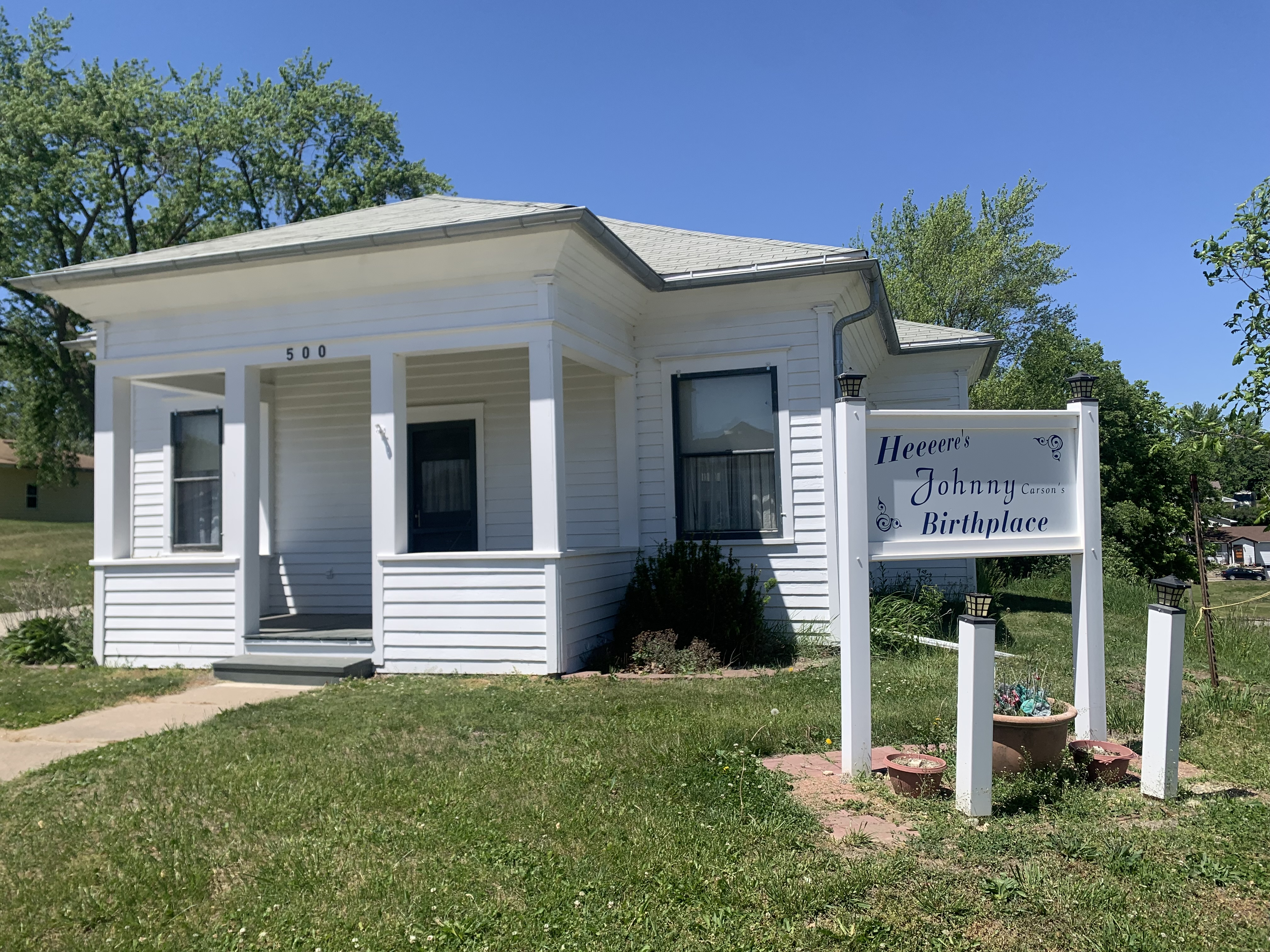
Johnny Carson's birthplace in Corning, Iowa

John William Carson was born on October 23, 1925, in Corning, Iowa, to Ruth Elizabeth Carson (née Hook; 1901–1985) and Homer Lloyd "Kit" Carson (1899–1983), a power company manager. Carson was the second of three children. He had an older sister, and a younger brother, Richard "Dick" Carson (1929–2021).

Growing up initially in Iowa, Carson lived in the towns of Avoca, Clarinda, and Red Oak before moving to Norfolk, Nebraska, at age eight. There, Carson began developing his talent for entertaining. At age 12, he found a book on magic at a friend's house and purchased a mail-order magician's kit. After purchasing the kit, Carson practiced his entertainment skills on family members with card tricks. During this period, he would follow his family members around, saying, "Pick a card, any card." Carson's mother made him a cape, and his first performance was in front of the local Kiwanis Club. He debuted as "The Great Carsoni" at age 14 and was paid $3 a show.

After graduating from high school, Carson hitchhiked to Hollywood, Los Angeles. There, he was arrested and fined $50 for impersonating a midshipman, a story often regarded as apocryphal.

== Military service ==
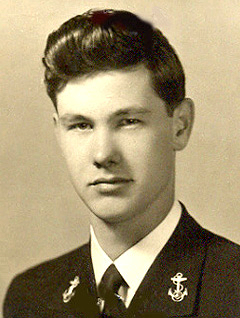
Navy portrait of Carson

Carson joined the United States Navy on June 8, 1943, and received V-12 Navy College Training Program officer training at Columbia University and Millsaps College. Commissioned an ensign late in the war, Carson was assigned to USS Pennsylvania in the Pacific. He arrived on the Pennsylvania on August 14, 1945, the same day Imperial Japan announced its surrender. The ship was sent to Guam after a torpedo bomber attack damaged its stern prior to Carson's arrival.

Once in drydock, Carson, assigned to damage control, was given the task of supervising the removal of the bodies of 20 servicemen and their effects. He recounted the experience in an unpublished 1967 Time interview, stating "Jesus, that was an awful experience. They'd been down there for 18 days by the time, and I want to tell you, that was a terrible job." Carson returned stateside with the Pennsylvania to Seattle and was assigned to command a troop train for returning servicemen. He finished his service in Guam, decoding encrypted messages.

Carson later said that the high point of his military career was performing a magic trick for U.S. secretary of the Navy James V. Forrestal. In a conversation with Forrestal, the secretary asked Carson if he planned to stay in the Navy after the war. In response, Carson said no and told him he wanted to be a magician. Forrestal asked him to perform, and Carson responded with a card trick. Carson discovered that he could entertain and amuse someone as cranky and sophisticated as Forrestal.

While in the Navy, Carson was an amateur boxer, with most of his bouts fought on board Pennsylvania.

== Education ==
Taking advantage of educational opportunities from the Navy, Carson attended the University of Nebraska, where he joined the Phi Gamma Delta fraternity and continued performing magic, then paid $25 per appearance. Carson majored in journalism with the intention of becoming a comedy writer, but instead switched his major to speech and drama a few months later because he wanted to become a radio performer. His college thesis, titled "How to Write Comedy for Radio", was a compilation of taped skits and jokes from popular radio shows with Carson explaining the comedic technique in a voiceover. It allowed him to graduate in three years. Carson graduated with a bachelor of arts degree in radio and speech with a minor in physics in 1949.

== Early radio and television ==
Carson began his broadcasting career in 1950 at WOW-AM and WOW-TV (now WOWT-TV) in Omaha, Nebraska. He soon hosted a morning television program called The Squirrel's Nest. One of his routines involved interviewing pigeons on the roof of the local courthouse that would report on the political corruption they had seen. Carson supplemented his income by serving as master of ceremonies at local church dinners—attended by some of the same politicians and civic leaders he had lampooned on the radio.

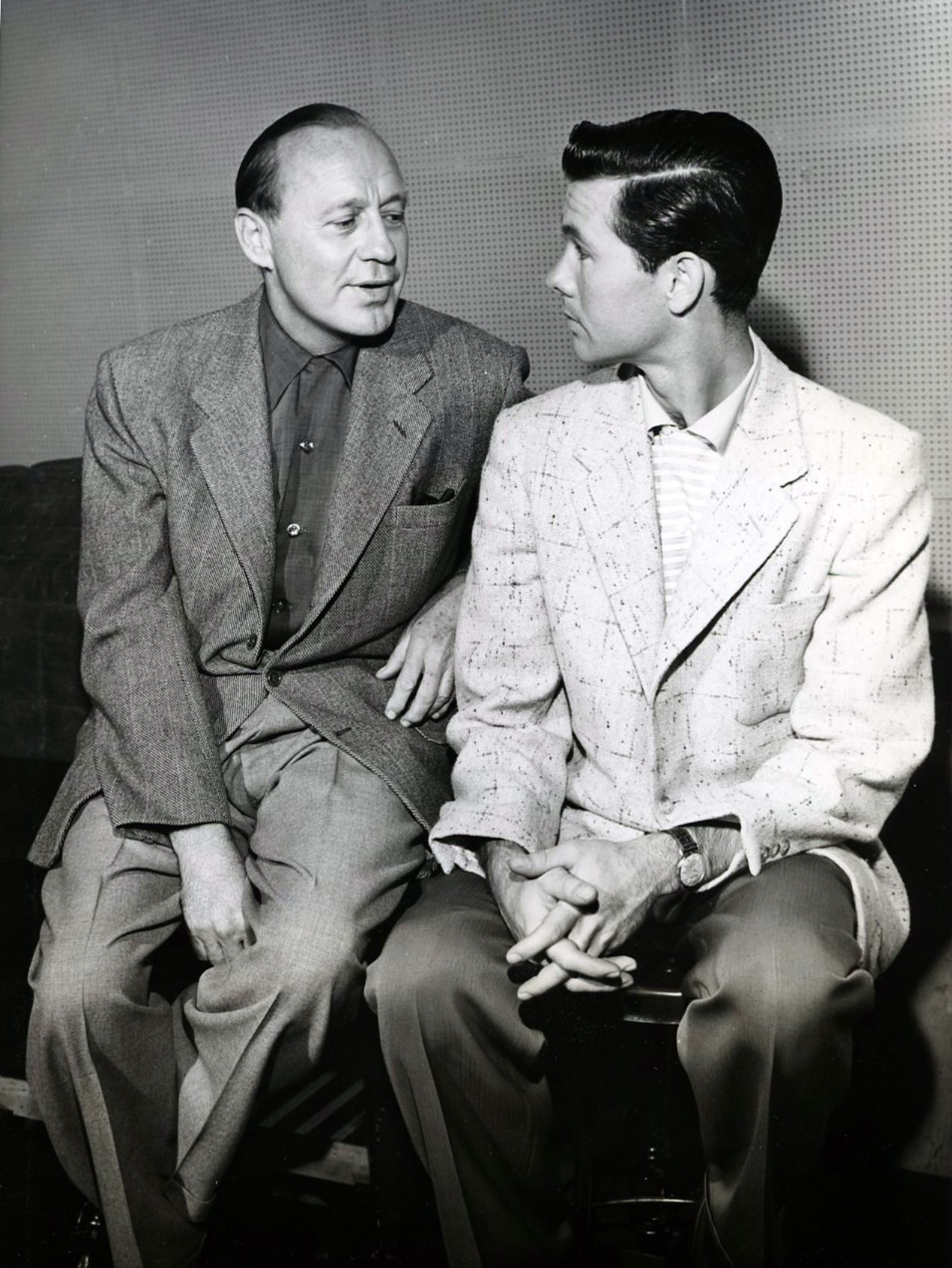
Carson as a guest on Jack Benny's television program, 1955

The wife of one of the Omaha political figures that Carson spoofed owned stock in a radio station in Los Angeles, and in 1951, referred Carson to her brother, who was influential in the emerging television market in Southern California. Carson joined CBS-owned Los Angeles television station KNXT (now KCBS-TV).

In 1953, comic Red Skelton—a fan of Carson's low-budget sketch comedy show, Carson's Cellar (1951–1953) on KNXT—asked Carson to join his show as a writer. In 1954, Skelton accidentally knocked himself unconscious during rehearsal, an hour before his live show began. Carson successfully filled in for him. In 1955, Jack Benny invited Carson to appear on one of his programs during the opening and closing segments. Carson imitated Benny and claimed that Benny had copied his gestures. Benny predicted that Carson, who readily admitted Benny's substantial influence on aspects of his comedic delivery, would have a successful career as a comedian.

Carson hosted several shows besides Carson's Cellar, including the game show Earn Your Vacation (1954) and the variety show The Johnny Carson Show (1955–1956). He was a guest panelist on the original To Tell the Truth beginning in 1960, becoming a regular panelist from 1961 to 1962.

After the primetime Johnny Carson Show failed, Carson moved to New York City to host ABC's Who Do You Trust? (1957–1962). It was on Who Do You Trust? that Carson met his future sidekick and straight man, Ed McMahon. Although Carson believed moving to daytime television would hurt his career, Who Do You Trust? was a success. It was the first show where he could ad lib and interview guests. Because of his on-camera wit, the show became "the hottest item on daytime television" during his six years at ABC. From his experience as a radio host, in 2000 Carson wrote a parody for The New Yorker of former talk-show host Dennis Miller having the new role at the time as an NFL sports announcer, titled "Proverbs of Dennis Miller".

== The Tonight Show ==
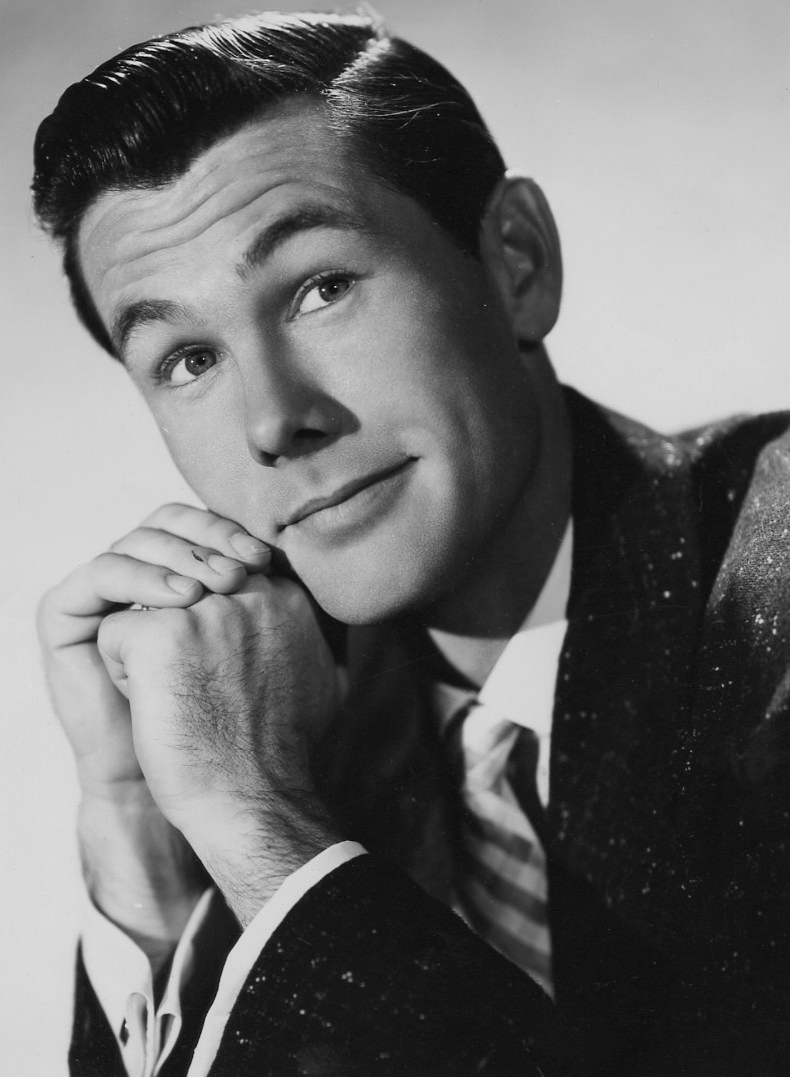
Carson in 1957

NBC's Tonight was the late-night counterpart to its early-morning show Today. Originating in 1954 with host Steve Allen, Tonight was somewhat experimental at the time, as the only previous network late-night program was NBC's Broadway Open House (1950–51), which starred Jerry Lester and Dagmar. Tonight was successful. Allen moved to primetime comedy-variety shows in 1957 when Jack Paar became host of Tonight. Paar left the show in 1962.

Carson's success on Who Do You Trust? led NBC to invite him to take over Tonight a few months before Paar's departure. Carson declined the offer because he feared the difficulty of interviewing celebrities for 105 minutes each day. Bob Newhart, Jackie Gleason, Groucho Marx, and Joey Bishop also declined. NBC finally convinced Carson to sign by early February 1962. He can be seen discussing his upcoming job for the first time on the February 11, 1962, episode of What's My Line? Because Carson had six months left on his ABC contract, NBC used multiple guest hosts until he could take over. Guest hosts included Bishop, Marx, Merv Griffin, Art Linkletter, Arlene Francis, Bob Cummings, Jerry Lewis, Donald O'Connor and others.

Although he continued to have doubts about his new job, Carson became the host of Tonight (later called The Tonight Show Starring Johnny Carson) on October 1, 1962. After a difficult first year, he overcame his fears. While Tonight under its previous hosts had been successful, especially under Paar, Carson's version eventually did very well in the ratings. Billy Wilder said of Carson:

By the simple law of survival, Carson is the best. He enchants the invalids and the insomniacs as well as the people who have to get up at dawn. He is the Valium and the Nembutal of a nation. No matter what kind of dead-asses are on the show, he has to make them funny and exciting. He has to be their nurse and their surgeon. He has no conceit. He does his work and he comes prepared. If he's talking to an author, he has read the book. Even his rehearsed routines sound improvised. He's the cream of middle-class elegance, yet he's not a mannequin. He has captivated the American bourgeoisie without ever offending the highbrows, and he has never said anything that wasn't liberal or progressive. Every night, in front of millions of people, he has to do the salto mortale [circus parlance for an aerial somersault performed on the tightrope]. What's more, he does it without a net. No rewrites. No retakes. The jokes must work tonight.

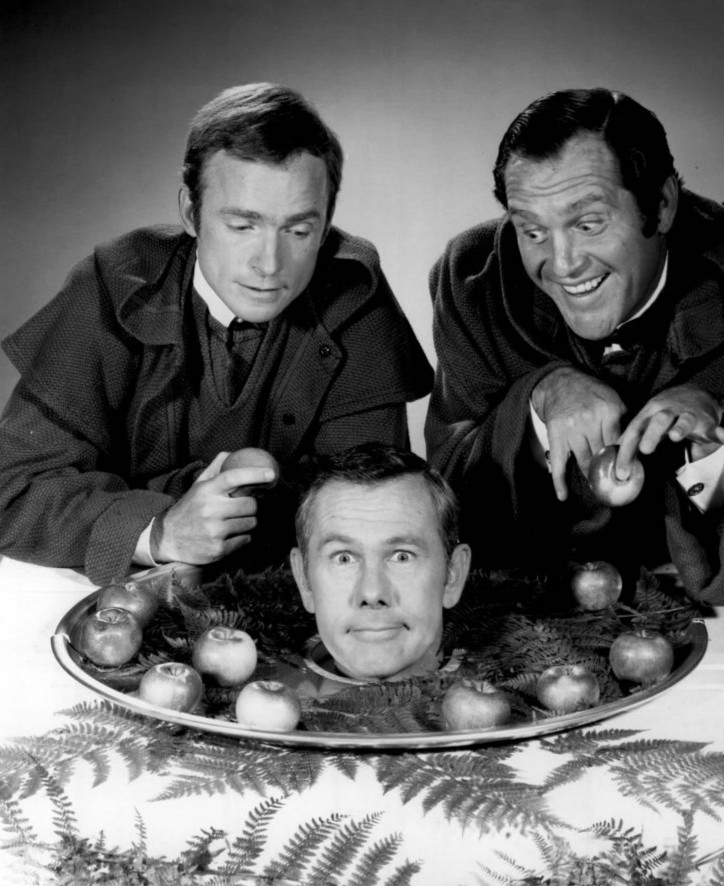
Carson with Dick Cavett and Alan King in a publicity photo promoting the 1968 California Friars Club roast of Carson.

McMahon followed Carson from Who Do You Trust? as his announcer and sidekick, and Skitch Henderson was installed as the maestro of the NBC Orchestra. McMahon's famous introduction, "Heeeeere's Johnny!!!" was followed by a brief monologue by Carson. This was often followed by comedy sketches, interviews, and live music. Carson's trademark was a phantom golf swing at the end of his monologues, aimed stage left toward the orchestra. (Guest hosts sometimes parodied that gesture. Newhart rolled an imaginary bowling ball toward the audience.)

Paul Anka wrote The Tonight Show's theme song, ("Johnny's Theme"), a reworking of his "Toot Sweet"; given lyrics, it was renamed "It's Really Love" and recorded by Annette Funicello in 1959. Before taking over The Tonight Show, Carson wrote lyrics for the song, and so claimed 50% of the song's performance royalties (though the lyrics were never used). The theme is heard being played on sound recordings of Carson's first Tonight Show, and it was used without interruption through to his last broadcast on May 22, 1992.

The Tonight Show was originally produced at NBC's headquarters at 30 Rockefeller Plaza in New York City, with occasional stints in California. The program began videotaping in advance during the Jack Paar days, although during the 1970s NBC fed the live taping from Burbank to New York via satellite for editing (see below). Carson had a talent for quick quips to deal with problems. If the opening monologue fared poorly, the band would start playing "Tea for Two" and Carson danced a softshoe to laughs from the studio audience. Alternatively, Carson might pull the boom microphone close to his face and announce, "Attention K-Mart shoppers, clean up in aisle four!"

=== Move to Burbank ===
On May 1, 1972, The Tonight Show moved from 30 Rockefeller Plaza to the NBC Studios in Burbank, California, because of the studio's proximity to celebrities.

From 1980, Carson stopped hosting five shows per week. Instead, Mondays featured a guest host, leaving Carson to host the other four weeknights. Shows were videotaped in Burbank at 5:30 pm, fed from there to the Central and Eastern Time Zone stations via cross-country television line at 8:30 pm Pacific time (11:30 pm Eastern time), and later sent from Burbank to the Pacific Time Zone stations at 11:30 pm Pacific time. Since only two feeds originated from Burbank, Central Time Zone stations received the Eastern feed one hour earlier at 10:30 pm local time, and Mountain time stations received the Pacific time zone feed one hour later, at 12:30 am local time.

Carson announced in April 1979 that he was leaving The Tonight Show after 17 years hosting the program. At the time, media analysts estimated the show generated 17% of NBC's pretax profits. He negotiated a three-year deal to remain with the show in May 1980, reducing the program's length from 90 to 60 minutes, while decreasing his workload from four to three nights each week. Tom Snyder's Tomorrow added a half-hour to fill the vacant time. Joan Rivers became the "permanent" guest host from September 1983 until 1986. The Tonight Show then returned to using rotating guest hosts, including comics George Carlin and Garry Shandling. Jay Leno became the exclusive guest host in fall 1987, later joking that although other guest hosts had upped their fees, he had kept his low, assuring himself more bookings. Eventually, Monday night was reserved for Leno and Tuesday night was reserved for The Best of Carson—rebroadcasts usually dating from a year earlier, but occasionally from the 1970s.

Although Carson's work schedule became more abbreviated, The Tonight Show remained so successful that his compensation from NBC continued to rise; by the mid-1970s, he had become the highest-paid personality on television, earning about $4 million a year ($19,745,000 today), not including nightclub appearances and his other businesses. Carson refused many offers to appear in films, including title roles in The Thomas Crown Affair and Gene Wilder's role in Blazing Saddles. He also declined director Martin Scorsese's offer to co-star with Robert De Niro in the 1983 film The King of Comedy, with the role of a TV talk-show host then going to Jerry Lewis.

In recognition of his 25th anniversary on The Tonight Show, Carson received a personal Peabody Award, the board saying he had "become an American institution, a household word, [and] the most widely quoted American". They also said they "felt the time had come to recognize the contributions that Johnny has made to television, to humor, and to America".

=== Uri Geller ===
In 1973, television personality and self-proclaimed psychic Uri Geller appeared on The Tonight Show. In the NOVA documentary, "James Randi – Secrets of the Psychics," magician and skeptical activist James Randi recalls that Carson "had been a magician himself and was skeptical" of Geller's claimed paranormal powers, so prior to the date of taping, Randi was personally asked "to help prevent any trickery". Per Randi's advice, the show's staff prepared its own props without informing Geller and did not let Geller or his staff "anywhere near them." When Geller joined Carson on stage, he appeared surprised that he was not going to be interviewed, but instead was expected to display his abilities using the provided articles. Geller was unable to display any paranormal abilities, saying, "I don't feel strong" and expressing displeasure at feeling like he was being "pressed" to perform by Carson. According to Adam Higginbotham's November 7, 2014, article in The New York Times:

The result was a legendary immolation, in which Geller offered up flustered excuses to his host as his abilities failed him again and again. "I sat there for 22 minutes, humiliated," Geller told me, when I spoke to him in September. "I went back to my hotel, devastated. I was about to pack up the next day and go back to Tel Aviv. I thought, That's it — I'm destroyed."

However, ironically, this appearance on The Tonight Show, which Carson and Randi had orchestrated to debunk Geller's claimed abilities, backfired. According to Higginbotham,

To Geller's astonishment, he was immediately booked on The Merv Griffin Show. He was on his way to becoming a paranormal superstar. "That Johnny Carson show made Uri Geller," Geller said. To an enthusiastically trusting public, his failure only made his gifts seem more real: If he were performing magic tricks, they would surely work every time.

=== Comic characters ===
Carson played several continuing characters on sketches during the show, including:

- Art Fern was the announcer of the "Tea Time Movie", which featured "Hooray for Hollywood" as its theme song. Carson once stated on camera that Fern was his favorite character. The character was inspired by late-afternoon movie broadcasts featuring television hosts who delivered live commericials during the films. Each sketch typically consisted of three lengthy commercials interspersed with four- second clips from old silent films. When the camera returned from each clip, Art was always caught off-guard and immediately reminded viewers that they were watching a film favorite. The movies always had unlikely casts and even less likely titles: "Slim Pickens, Patti Page, Duke Wayne, and Charlton Heston in another classic Western: Kiss My Saddle Horn! Carson originally played the fast-talking huckster in his own voice (as Honest Bernie Schlock or Ralph Willie (parodying California used-car dealer Ralph Williams), and the sketch was called "The Big Flick". Carson finally settled on a nasal, high-pitched, smarmy drone, reminiscent of Jackie Gleason's "Reginald Van Gleason III" character. The sketch was renamed "Tea Time Movie" and the host became Art Fern, wearing a lavish toupee, loud jackets, and a pencil mustache. Actress Carol Wayne became famous for her 100-plus appearances (1971–1984) as Art's buxom assistant, the Matinée Lady. While Art gave his spiel, she would enter the stage behind him. Art would react to her attractive body by wincing, loudly shouting "Ho — leeeee!" and turning almost everything she said into a sexual double entendre. After Carol Wayne's accidental death in 1985, Carson kept Art Fern off the air for most of the next year, and finally hired Danuta Wesley and then Teresa Ganzel to play the Matinée Lady. Carson also used these sketches to poke fun at the intricate Los Angeles interstate system, using a pointer and map to give confusing directions to shoppers, often including points where he would unfold the cardboard map to point out, via the appropriate picture, when the shopper would arrive at "the fork in the road". Another freeway routine in the same theme centered on the "Slauson Cutoff", a slang term Carson popularized to describe the truncated Marina Freeway (which ended abruptly at Slauson Avenue in Culver City). Art Fern would advise drivers to take a series of freeways until they reached the Slauson Cutoff, and would then advise them to "Get out of your car, cut off your slauson, get back in your car," often followed by peals of laughter from the audience, led by McMahon.
- Carnac the Magnificent, a turbaned psychic, could answer questions before seeing them. The character was taken from Steve Allen's essentially identical "Answer Man", which Allen performed during his tenure as host of Tonight in the 1950s. As Allen acknowledged in his book The Question Man, this bit had been created in Kansas City in 1951 by Bob Arbogast and used on The Tom Poston Show in New York, where it eventually ended up on The Steve Allen Show, much to the surprise of both Bob and Steve. Carnac had a trademark entrance in which he always turned the wrong direction when coming onstage and then tripped on the step up to Carson's desk. (In one episode, technicians rigged Carson's desk to fall apart when Carnac fell into it.) These comedic missteps were an indication of Carnac's true prescient abilities. McMahon would hand Carson a series of envelopes containing questions, said to have been "hermetically sealed and kept in a mayonnaise jar on Funk and Wagnalls' porch since noon today". Carson would place each envelope against his forehead and predict the answer, such as "Gatorade". Then, he would read the question: "What does an alligator get on welfare?" Some of the jokes were feeble, and McMahon used pauses after terrible puns and audience groans to make light of Carson's lack of comic success ("Carnac must be used to quiet surroundings"), prompting Carson to return an equal insult. McMahon would always announce near the end, "I hold in my hand the last envelope," at which the audience would applaud wildly, prompting Carnac to pronounce a comedic "curse" on the audience, such as, "May a flock of wild geese leave a deposit on your breakfast!", "May your sister elope with a camel!", or "May a diseased yak take a liking to your sister". Staff writer Pat McCormick wrote some of the zaniest Carnac material. One joke had McMahon and Carson nearly rolling on the floor with sustained laughter. The answer was "Sis boom bah". The question: "Describe the sound made when a sheep explodes."
- Floyd R. Turbo American (with no pause between words) was a stereotypical common working man, wearing a plaid hunting coat and cap, who offered "editorial responses" to left-leaning causes or news events. Railing against women's rights in the workplace, for example, Turbo would shout: "This raises the question: kiss my Dictaphone!"
- Aunt Blabby, a cantankerous and sometimes amorous old lady, was an obvious copy of Jonathan Winters' most famous creation, Maude Frickert, including her black spinster dress and wig. Aunt Blabby was invariably interviewed by straight man Ed McMahon about elder affairs. McMahon would innocently use a common expression such as "check out", only to have Aunt Blabby warn him: "Don't say 'check out' to an old person!"
- El Mouldo, a mentalist, was a revival of Carson's 1960s character the Amazing Dillinger, burlesquing mentalist Joseph Dunninger. El Mouldo would attempt to perform mind-reading and mind-over-matter feats, all of which failed. Often, his tricks would include an attempt to bilk money from Ed McMahon or would end with his begging the audience for a dollar, or at least bus fare.
- The Maharishi, whose theme song was "Song of India", was a frizzy-haired "holy man" who spoke in a high-pitched, tranquil tone, greeted announcer McMahon with a flower and answered philosophical questions. This was a take-off on Maharishi Mahesh Yogi.
- Doctor Dilly as a feeble-minded physician who dispensed rambling medical advice. Carson imitated stage and radio comedian Ed Wynn for this character, using a high, cracked voice and a silly giggle.

One time-honored routine was used whenever Carson and a guest toasted each other with glasses of water on the air. Carson would telegraph the joke to the guest: "The king is dead!" Then both would shout "Long live the king!" and take a mouthful of water. Offscreen, Ed McMahon cried, "The king lives!", prompting Carson and the guest to do a spit-take in mock terror. Don Adams, Don Rickles, Mel Brooks, and Dom DeLuise engaged in this routine; one of Adams's Get Smart episodes was even titled "The King Lives?"

=== Carson uncensored on satellite ===
Although Carson's program moved to Burbank in 1972, NBC's editing and production services for the show remained in New York, requiring that the program be transmitted between the two cities. In 1976, NBC used the Satcom 2 satellite to achieve this, feeding the live taping (which started around 5:30 pm local time) directly to New York, where it would be edited prior to the late-night broadcast. This live feed lasted usually for two to two-and-a-half hours a night and was both uncensored and commercial-free. During the slots for commercial breaks, the audio and picture feed would continue, capturing at times risqué language and other events that would be edited out before transmission.

At the same time, satellite ground stations owned by individuals began appearing, and some found the live feed. Satellite dish owners began to document their sightings in technical journals, giving viewers knowledge of things they were not meant to see. Carson and his production staff grew concerned about this and pressured NBC into ceasing the satellite transmissions of the live taping in the early 1980s. The satellite link was replaced by microwave transmission until the show's editing facilities were moved to Burbank.

== Filmography ==
=== Television work as character ===
Show	Episode	Character	Year	Ref.
Playhouse 90	"Three Men on a Horse"	Erwin Trowbridge	1957	
The U.S. Steel Hour	"The Queen of the Orange Bowl"	Kenneth Rausch	1960	
Get Smart	"Aboard the Orient Express"	Special guest conductor	1965	
Get Smart	"The King Lives?"	Herald (uncredited)	1968	

Carson played himself in the 1964 film Looking for Love. He was also a surprise guest on the 1970s Bob Hope television special Joys! (a parody of the hit movie Jaws). Guests on the broadcast included Groucho Marx, George Burns, Telly Savalas, Milton Berle, Red Buttons, Don Adams, Steve Allen, and Harry Ritz, The special was written and produced by Hal Kanter.

== Controversies and feuds ==
Carson often made jokes at the expense of other celebrities. In 1980, Carson backed out of a deal to acquire the Aladdin Hotel & Casino in Las Vegas, and a competing group led by Wayne Newton bought the property. According to lawyer Henry Bushkin, Carson became annoyed that he was portrayed in the media as having "lost" the deal and reacted by telling jokes on his show about Newton. This led to a feud between Carson and Newton. Years later, Newton appeared on Larry King Live, declaring that "Johnny Carson is a mean-spirited human being. And there are people that he has hurt that people will never know about. And for some reason at some point, he decided to turn that kind of negative attention toward me. And I refused to have it." Newton has often told of confronting Carson; ultimately, Newton barged into Carson's office at the NBC studios and threatened to beat him up unless he stopped making such jokes.

On February 27, 1982, Carson was arrested for drunk driving on La Cienega Boulevard, near Beverly Hills; he was released on his own recognizance. Carson pleaded no contest to the charges and, in October 1982, received a sentence of three years probation, was fined $603, and was required to attend a driver's education alcohol program. Carson's driving privilege was restricted to driving only to and from work and alcohol education classes for a period of 90 days.

Perry Mason actor Raymond Burr became angry over Carson's continuing jokes about his weight, and he appeared on The Tonight Show only twice, in 1968 and 1976.

On July 2, 1969, Carson launched an on-air attack on The New York Times after his nightly monologue, assailing the newspaper for an article saying that he was the highest-paid performer on television, earning $75,000 a week, equivalent to $658,462 in 2025. He denied that was so, while declining to reveal his compensation in a subsequent interview with the newspaper, and called the article "damned unfair". The Times published a follow-up article saying that its initial reporter "erred", and that $75,000 a week was unlikely.

Carson reportedly loathed what he perceived as disloyalty, and he was furious when former frequent Tonight Show guest hosts John Davidson and Joan Rivers began hosting their own talk shows. Rivers' show on the Fox Network directly competed with Carson during the 1986–1987 season before being canceled. On June 24, 2009, following Ed McMahon's death, Rivers spoke highly of McMahon on Larry King Live, but said that after she got her own show, Carson refused to ever speak to her again, despite her efforts to apologize.

In December 1973, Carson joked on Tonight about an alleged shortage of toilet paper. Viewers believed the story and panic buying and hoarding ensued across the United States as consumers emptied stores, causing a real shortage that lasted for weeks. Stores and toilet paper manufacturers had to ration supplies until the panic ended. Carson apologized in January 1974 for the incident, which became what The New York Times called a "classic study" of how rumors spread. Carson called references in the article to him "very unfair".

Carson successfully sued a manufacturer of portable toilets that wanted to call its product "Here's Johnny".

Carson performed a parody of Mister Rogers' Neighborhood. Rogers noted, "I've told Johnny that I like humor as much as anybody. But what concerns me is the takeoffs that make me seem so wimpy! I hope it doesn't communicate that Mr. Rogers is just somebody to be made fun of. Only people who take the time to see our work can begin to understand the depth of it." Carson later apologized to Rogers for making fun of him.

== Business ventures ==
In 1979, Carson invested $500,000 (equivalent to $2,218,019 in 2025) in the DeLorean Motor Company. Guest Red Skelton kidded Carson on the air about DeLorean and the widely reported allegations of cocaine trafficking: "That car of yours, the DeLorean? Is that a hopped-up car?"

Carson was head of a group of investors who purchased and operated two television stations. The first was KVVU-TV in Henderson, Nevada, an independent station serving Las Vegas, acquired by the Carson group in 1979. Shortly after buying the station, KVVU was rumored to be acquiring an NBC affiliation because long-time affiliate KORK-TV was in the process of being replaced by KVBC and KSNV, but it never happened.

Carson's second station, independent KNAT-TV in Albuquerque, New Mexico, was purchased in 1982. Unlike the Las Vegas operation, KNAT faced stiffer competition for top-quality, syndicated programming. Carson sold both of his stations in 1985 and 1986, with KVVU-TV (FOX 5) going to the Meredith Corporation and KNAT being sold to Trinity Broadcasting Network.

Carson founded Carson Productions in 1980. The company primarily produced The Tonight Show Starring Johnny Carson from 1980 to 1992 and Late Night with David Letterman from 1982 to 1993, along with other TV shows, including Teachers Only from 1982 to 1983, Partners in Crime from 1984 to 1985, Amen from 1986 to 1991 and TV's Bloopers & Practical Jokes (co-produced with Dick Clark Productions) from 1984 to 1993. It produced the films The Big Chill (1983) and Desert Bloom (1986).

Carson's other business ventures included the successful Johnny Carson Apparel, Inc.—his turtlenecks became a fashion trend—and a failed restaurant franchise.

== Retirement ==
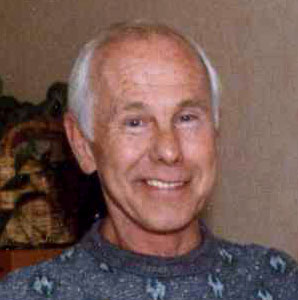
Carson in the 1990s

Carson retired from show business on May 22, 1992, at age 66, when he stepped down as host of The Tonight Show. His farewell was a major media event, often emotional for Carson, his colleagues, and the audiences, and stretched over several nights. In tribute to Carson and his enormous influence, several networks that had late-night variety talk shows "went dark" for the entire hour he did the last show.

After 13 tries, The Tonight Show won the Emmy for Outstanding Variety, Music or Comedy Series later that year, buoyed by the penultimate broadcast, which featured Johnny's final two guests, Robin Williams and Bette Midler.

NBC gave the role of host to the show's then-current permanent guest host, Jay Leno. Leno and David Letterman were soon competing on separate networks.

=== Post-retirement appearances ===
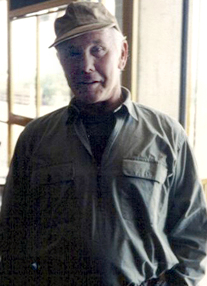
On a trip to Tanzania in 1994

At the end of his final Tonight Show episode, Carson indicated that he might, if so inspired, return with a new project. Instead, he chose to go into full retirement, rarely giving interviews and declining to participate in NBC's 75th-anniversary celebrations. He made an occasional cameo appearance, including voicing himself on the May 13, 1993, episode of The Simpsons ("Krusty Gets Kancelled"), telephoning David Letterman on a November 1993 episode of Late Show with David Letterman, and appearing in the 1993 NBC special Bob Hope: The First 90 Years.

On May 13, 1994, Carson appeared on the Late Show with David Letterman. During a week of shows from Los Angeles, Letterman was having Larry "Bud" Melman (Calvert DeForest) deliver his "Top Ten Lists" under the guise that a famous personality would be delivering the list instead. On the last show of the week, Letterman indicated that Carson would be delivering the list. Instead, DeForest delivered the list, insulted the audience, in keeping with the gag, and walked off to polite applause. Letterman then indicated that the card he was given did not have the proper list on it and asked that the "real" list be brought out.

On that cue, the real Carson emerged from behind the curtain as Letterman's band played "Johnny's Theme", an appearance that prompted a 90-second standing ovation from the audience. Carson then asked to sit behind Letterman's desk. Letterman obliged, as the audience continued to cheer and applaud. After some moments, Carson departed from the show without having spoken to the audience. He later cited acute laryngitis as the reason for his silence. This turned out to be Carson's last television appearance.

Carson played tennis throughout his retirement.

Carson also reviewed clips of the Tonight Show included in DVD compilations, and he had humor pieces published in The New Yorker.

=== David Letterman ===
Prior to his death, Carson occasionally sent jokes to David Letterman. Letterman would then use these jokes in the monologue of his show, which Carson got "a big kick out of", according to Worldwide Pants Inc. senior vice president Peter Lassally, who formerly produced both men's programs. He said Carson had always believed Letterman, not Leno, to be his "rightful successor". In his first broadcast after Carson's death, Letterman delivered a monologue compiled entirely of jokes sent in by Carson, a fact the host revealed a short time later in the program.

== Influences ==
Johnny Carson's influences included Jack Benny, Red Skelton, Fred Allen, Bob Hope, Groucho Marx, and Jack Paar.

== Legacy and impact on popular culture ==
Carson's show launched the careers of many performers, especially comedians and musicians. For a comedian appearing on the show, getting Carson to laugh and being invited to the guest chair were considered the highest honors. Notable among these were David Letterman, Freddie Prinze, Robin Williams, Jay Leno, Jerry Seinfeld, Arsenio Hall, Jeff Foxworthy, Ellen DeGeneres, Rodney Dangerfield, Joan Rivers, David Brenner, Tim Allen, Drew Carey, Howie Mandel, Roseanne Barr, and Don Rickles. Carson was the successor to The Ed Sullivan Show as a showcase for different types of talent, as well as continuing a vaudeville-style variety show.

In 1966, Carson popularized Milton Bradley's game Twister when he played it with actress Eva Gabor. Not widely known up to that time, the game skyrocketed in popularity after the broadcast.

Comedians who have credited Carson as an influence include David Letterman, Jay Leno, Conan O'Brien, Dennis Miller, Bill Maher, Joan Rivers, Larry Wilmore, Ray Romano, Don Rickles, Bob Newhart, Angie Dickinson, Carl Reiner, Mel Brooks, Dick Cavett, Norm Macdonald, David Steinberg, Jerry Seinfeld, Ellen DeGeneres, Garry Shandling, Steve Martin, Ray Combs, Arsenio Hall, Craig Ferguson, Orson Bean, and Jimmy Fallon.

Brian Wilson was an avid fan of the show and in 1977 wrote a song titled "Johnny Carson" as a tribute. It was released on the Beach Boys Love You album.

In 1983, he was awarded American Library Association Honorary Membership.

== Personal life ==
Despite his on-camera demeanor, Carson was introverted off-camera. He avoided most parties and was called "the most private public man who ever lived." Dick Cavett recalled, "I felt sorry for Johnny in that he was so socially uncomfortable. I've hardly ever met anybody who had as hard a time as he did."

George Axelrod once said of Carson, "Socially, he doesn't exist. The reason is that there are no television cameras in living rooms. If human beings had little red lights in the middle of their foreheads, Carson would be the greatest conversationalist on Earth." Musician John Oates later similarly recalled that "he was very subdued. But the moment the countdown started—'three, two, one'—and the lights came on the camera, he was Johnny Carson. He was like, boom. It was that pencil-tapping thing with the coffee mug. And then the moment they went to a commercial, it was like he just stopped."

He normally refused to discuss politics, social controversies, his childhood, and his private life with interviewers, and offered a list of pre-written answers to inquiring journalists, suggesting that they append their own questions to them. Among the answers were "Yes, I did," "Not a bit of truth in that rumor," and "No, kumquats."

=== Political views and activism ===
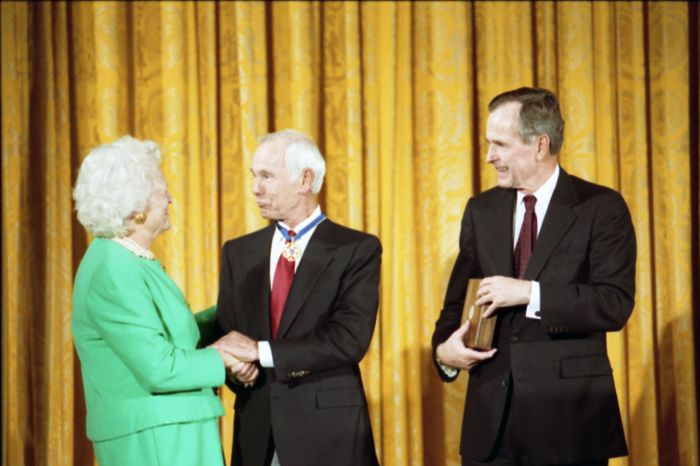
Carson being awarded the Presidential Medal of Freedom by President George H. W. Bush and First Lady Barbara Bush in 1992

Carson opposed the Vietnam War and capital punishment, favored racial equality, and was against criminalizing extramarital sex and pornography. He avoided explicitly mentioning his views on The Tonight Show, saying he "hates to be pinned down" as that would "hurt me as an entertainer, which is what I am". As he explained in 1970, "In my living room I would argue for liberalization of abortion laws, divorce laws, and there are times when I would like to express a view on the air. I would love to have taken on Billy Graham. But I'm on TV five nights a week; I have nothing to gain by it and everything to lose." He also seldom invited political figures onto the Tonight Show because he "didn't want it to become a political forum" and did not want the show used, by himself or others, to influence the opinions of the viewers.

In his book, Carson's former lawyer Henry Bushkin stated, he "was by instinct and upbringing definitely Republican, but of an Eisenhower sort that we don't see much of anymore ... Overall, you'd have to say he was anti-big: anti-big government, anti-big money, anti-big bullies, anti-big blowhards." Carson served as MC for Ronald Reagan's inaugural gala in 1981 at the request of Frank Sinatra.

=== Legal issue ===
In October 1982, Carson pleaded no contest to a misdemeanor count of driving with a blood alcohol level above the legal limit, while the charges of driving under the influence of alcohol and driving without a license were withdrawn by the prosecution. This case stemmed from an arrest in February 1982. After being pulled over by police shortly after leaving an Italian restaurant with his wife, Carson was fined $603 and placed on three years of probation.

Municipal Court Judge David Kidney ordered Carson to attend a driver's education alcohol program and restricted his license for 90 days to trips to and from work and those classes. Though his lawyer Robert Shapiro advised Carson to take his case to trial believing they had a winning case, Carson was looking to move on from the scandal and wanted to avoid the media attention that a trial would bring. Carson commented on the matter in a monologue of the Tonight Show saying, "I regret the incident, And I'll tell you one thing, You will never see me do that again."

=== Religion ===
As an adult, Carson was not a regular churchgoer. During his childhood he was raised as a Methodist and during high school attended Christian Endeavor meetings at the local church.

=== Marriages ===
In October 1949, Carson married Jody Wolcott (1926–2015) in North Platte, Nebraska. The marriage was volatile, with infidelities committed by both parties, and ended in divorce in May 1963.

On August 17, 1963, Carson married Joanne Copeland. After a protracted divorce in 1972, Carson's second, Copeland received a settlement of nearly US$500,000 (equivalent to $3,848,449 in 2025), in addition to an annual hundred thousand in alimony. She also received "a pretty nice little art collection". She later had a second marriage that ended in divorce, and died in California, aged 83, in 2015. She had no children.

During fall 1971, while going through the divorce proceedings with Copeland, Carson—having dinner at the 21 Club in New York City with a group of friends that included fashion designer Mollie Parnis—spotted 40-year-old former model Joanna Holland (née Ulrich, 1931–2025) who, having done modelling work for Parnis in the past, passed by and waved at the designer. Taken by Holland's looks, Carson then reportedly arranged, through Parnis, for Holland to take his phone call several days later. Herself a divorcée, Holland had also had a child, son Tim, from a previous marriage. Carson's and Holland's first date in late October 1971, dinner and a show, doubled as his 46th birthday celebration and for the next year he reportedly called her every day at 4:30 p.m. From May 1972, Carson's Tonight Show moved production to Burbank and, soon after, Holland and her 11-year-old son joined him in California where he purchased a US$500,000 Bel-Air mansion that had originally belonged to filmmaker Mervyn LeRoy. During the Tonight Show's 10th-anniversary party at the Beverly Hills Hotel on September 30, 1972, Carson announced that Holland and he had been secretly married that afternoon in Santa Monica, shocking his friends and associates. Having spent time at luxury destinations such as Biarritz, Monte Carlo, and Saint Moritz in the early 1960s with her ex-husband, Holland reportedly introduced Carson to Western European travel—instigating their visits and stays at Hôtel du Cap in Antibes and Wimbledon Championships—which he reportedly enjoyed immensely due to being unknown there and thus not bothered by fans. The couple separated during November 1982, reportedly at Holland's urging due to Carson's infidelity, with Carson moving out of their Bel-Air home into their Malibu beach house. On March 8, 1983, she filed for divorce.

In August 1985, the divorce case ended with an 80-page settlement, with Holland receiving US$20 million (equivalent to $59,870,050 in 2025) in combined assets, from property (the couple's Bel-Air mansion, three of their Manhattan apartments: at the Pierre hotel, on Fifth Avenue, and on 62nd Street, as well as their Rolls-Royce, a Mercedes-Benz and an economy car) and cash (alimony payments of US$35,000 per month for 64 months). Following the divorce, Carson frequently used its financial terms as a source of comedic material on the Tonight Show. Holland's son, Carson's ex-stepson, Tim Holland, later known as Joe, died in May 1994 of pulmonary embolism. Joanna Holland died in July 2025, aged 93.

On June 20, 1987, Carson married Alexis Maas. The marriage lasted until his death in 2005.

Carson reportedly joked, "My giving advice on marriage is like the captain of the Titanic giving lessons on navigation."

=== Children ===
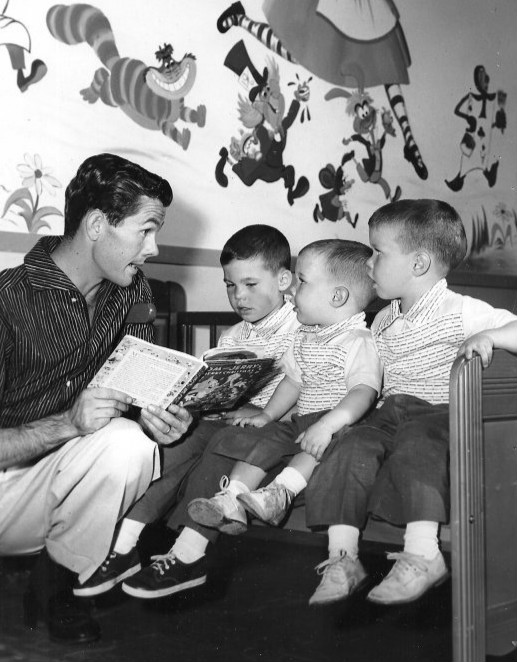
Carson reading a story to his three sons in 1955

Carson had three sons with his first wife: Christopher Wolcott (1950–2025), Kim Arthur "Ricky" (1951–1991) and Barry William "Cory" (born 1953).

His middle son, Ricky, died in a car accident in 1991 while shooting nature photographs. Upon Carson's return to air a few weeks later, he delivered a lengthy tribute to his son at the end of the show—a moment interrupted by his producer, Fred de Cordova, who gave Carson the signal to "wrap it up" because the show was running overtime. The incident led to de Cordova being banned from the studio floor for the remainder of the show's tenure.

During his final Tonight Show broadcasts in May 1992, Carson brought his two surviving sons onto the stage, while the final episode included one of his late son's nature photographs for the final credit roll.

=== Philanthropy ===
In 1981, Carson created the John W. Carson Foundation, dedicated to supporting children, education, and health services. In August 2010, his charitable foundation reported receiving $156 million (equivalent to $257,164,764 in 2025) from a personal trust established by the entertainer years before his 2005 death, thus becoming by far the largest Hollywood charity. As of 2022, the foundation continues to support charitable causes.

In November 2004, Carson announced a $5.3 million gift to the University of Nebraska Foundation to support the Hixson–Lied College of Fine and Performing Arts Department of Theater Arts, which created the Johnny Carson School of Theater and Film. Another $5 million donation was announced by the estate of Carson to the University of Nebraska following his death, while a $1 million donation was announced on November 4, 2011, creating the Johnny Carson Opportunity Scholarship Fund. The foundation made another $5 million donation to the university on October 22, 2021, to augment the Opportunity Scholarship Fund.

Carson also donated to causes in his adopted hometown of Norfolk, including the Carson Cancer Center at Faith Regional Health Services, the Elkhorn Valley Museum, and the Johnny Carson Theater at Norfolk Senior High School. Carson also donated to the Northeast Community College Lifelong Learning Center in honor of his favorite teacher, Miss Fay Gordon. Miss Gordon had appeared on his show a number of times. His last known visit to Norfolk was to throw the 100th-birthday party for Miss Gordon, which Carson had promised to do several years earlier.

=== Other interests ===
Carson, an amateur astronomer, was a close friend of astronomer Carl Sagan, who often appeared on The Tonight Show. The unique way Sagan had of saying certain words, like "billions" of stars, would lead Carson to ribbing his friend, saying "BILL-ions and BILL-ions". Carson was the first person to contact Sagan's wife Ann Druyan with condolences when the scientist died in 1996. He owned several telescopes, including a top-of-the-line unit. In 1981, the minor planet 1981 EM_{4} was named in his honor, 3252 Johnny. That year, a star was also nicknamed after Carson.

Carson was an amateur drummer and was shown on a 1979 segment of 60 Minutes practicing at home on a drum set given to him by his close friend Buddy Rich, who was the jazz musician with the most appearances on The Tonight Show. Gore Vidal, another frequent Tonight Show guest and friend, wrote about Carson's personality in his 2006 memoir.

Carson was an avid tennis player. When he sold a Malibu house to John McEnroe and Tatum O'Neal, the escrow terms required McEnroe to give Johnny six tennis lessons. Carson's primary tennis teacher was Bob Trapenberg, who taught him for some time, and traveled with him to Wimbledon.

Carson was also a private pilot; his flight logbook and jacket were donated after his death to the Experimental Aircraft Association in Oshkosh, Wisconsin.

== Final years, death and tributes ==
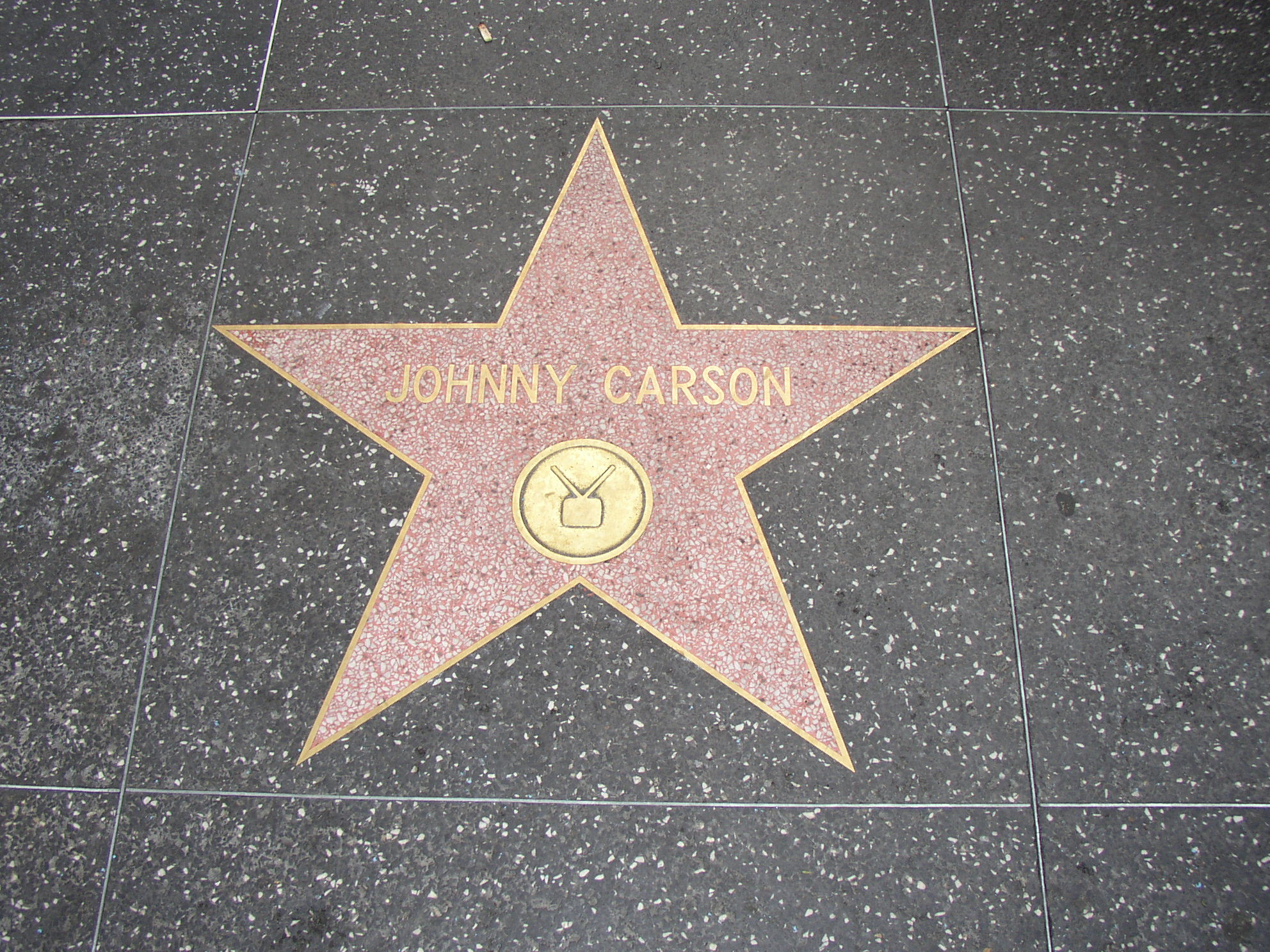
Carson's star on the Hollywood Walk of Fame

On March 19, 1999, Carson suffered a severe heart attack at his home in Malibu, California, and was hospitalized in nearby Santa Monica, where he underwent quadruple-bypass surgery.

Carson had been a heavy smoker for decades, and in the early days of his tenure on The Tonight Show, he often smoked on-camera, at one point having smoked four packs of Pall Mall cigarettes a day. It was reported that as early as the mid-1970s, he would repeatedly say, "These things are killing me." His younger brother recalled that during their last conversation, Carson kept saying, "Those damn cigarettes."

In 2002, he turned down an offer to appear at NBC's 75th anniversary.

In September 2002, Carson revealed that he had emphysema but denied he was terminally ill. On January 23, 2005, Carson died at Cedars-Sinai Medical Center in Los Angeles of respiratory failure arising from emphysema. His body was cremated, and the ashes were given to his wife, Alexis Maas. In accordance with his family's wishes, no public memorial service was held. Carson was also survived by his younger brother, Dick, who was an Emmy Award–winning director of, among other things, the competing Merv Griffin Show and Wheel of Fortune.

Numerous tributes were paid to Carson upon his death, including a statement by then-president George W. Bush, all recognizing the deep and enduring affection held for him.

On January 31, 2005, Late Show with David Letterman paid tribute with former Tonight Show executive producer Peter Lassally and bandleader Doc Severinsen. At the beginning of this show, Letterman said that for 30 years, no matter what was going on in the world, whether people had had a good or bad day, they wanted to end it being "tucked in by Johnny." He also told his viewers that the monologue he had just performed, which was very well received by the studio audience, consisted entirely of jokes sent to him by Carson in the last few months of his life. Doc Severinsen ended the Letterman show that night by conducting and playing, along with Tommy Newsom and Ed Shaughnessy, one of Carson's two favorite songs, "Here's That Rainy Day", the other was "I'll Be Seeing You". The Tonight Show with Jay Leno paid tribute to Carson with guests Ed McMahon, Bob Newhart, Don Rickles, Drew Carey, and k.d. lang.

On his final Tonight Show appearance, Carson said that while sometimes people who work together for long stretches of time on television do not necessarily like each other, this was not the case with McMahon. He and McMahon were good friends who would have drinks and dinner together, and the camaraderie they had on the show could not be faked. Their friendship spanned 46 years.

The 2005 film The Aristocrats was dedicated to Carson.

The Simpsons' seventh episode of season 16, entitled "Mommie Beerest", was dedicated to his memory.

At the first Comedy Awards on Comedy Central, the Johnny Carson Award was given to David Letterman. At the 2nd Annual Comedy Awards on Comedy Central, the Johnny Carson Award was given to Don Rickles.

A two-hour documentary about his life, Johnny Carson: King of Late Night, aired on PBS in May 2012, as part of PBS's American Masters series. It is narrated by Kevin Spacey and features interviews with many of Carson's family, fellow comedians, and protégés.

A park is named in his memory in Burbank, across from the former NBC Studios.

Media offices
Preceded by Jack Paar	Host of The Tonight Show; October 1, 1962 – May 22, 1992	Succeeded by Jay Leno
Preceded by Bob Hope	Host of the Academy Awards; 1979–82	Succeeded by Liza Minnelli, Dudley Moore, Richard Pryor and Walter Matthau
Preceded by Liza Minnelli, Dudley Moore, Richard Pryor and Walter Matthau	Host of the Academy Awards; 1984	Succeeded by Jack Lemmon
