= Fugitive at Large =

1939 film

- Directed by: Lewis D. Collins
- Written by: Eric Taylor; Harvey Gates
- Produced by: Rudolph C. Flothow; Larry Darmour
- Starring: Jack Holt; Patricia Ellis; Stanley Fields
- Cinematography: James S. Brown Jr.
- Edited by: Dwight Caldwell
- Production company: Larry Darmour Productions
- Distributed by: Columbia Pictures
- Release date: December 7, 1939
- Running time: 66 minutes
- Country: United States
- Language: English

Fugitive at Large is a 1939 American crime film directed by Lewis D. Collins and starring Jack Holt, Patricia Ellis and Stanley Fields.

== Cast ==
- Jack Holt as Tom Farrow / George Storm
- Patricia Ellis as Patricia Farrow
- Stanley Fields as Manning
- Guinn 'Big Boy' Williams as Conway
- Arthur Hohl as Curtis
- Weldon Heyburn as Corrick
- Donald Douglas as Stevens
- Leon Ames as Carter
- Cy Kendall as Prison Guard Captain
- Hal Taliaferro as Truck Guard
- Edward LeSaint as Judge

== Bibliography ==
- Slide, Anthony. The New Historical Dictionary of the American Film Industry. Routledge, 2014.
