= Patricia Ellis =

American actress (1918–1970)

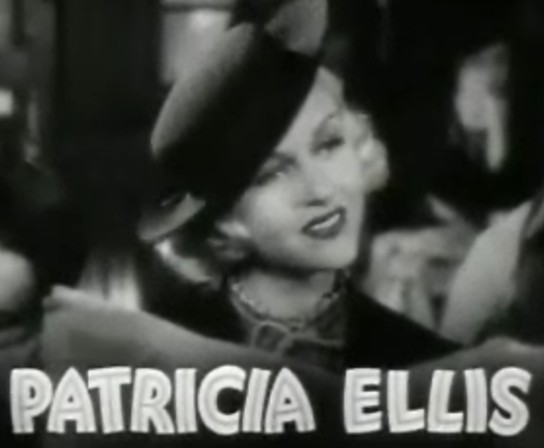
- Trailer for Bright Lights (1935)
- Born: Patricia Gene O'Brien; May 20, 1918; Birmingham, Michigan, U.S.
- Died: March 26, 1970 (aged 51); Kansas City, Missouri, U.S.
- Other name: Patricia Leftwich
- Occupations: singer and film actress
- Years active: 1932–1941
- Spouse: George T. O'Maley (m. 1941)
- Children: 1

Patricia Ellis (born Patricia Gene O'Brien; May 20, 1918 – March 26, 1970) was an American film actress from 1932 to 1939 who also maintained a brief singing career until 1941.

== Early years ==
Born in Birmingham, Michigan in 1918 (although she provided her year of birth to the Social Security Administration as 1920), Ellis was the eldest of four children born to Eugene Gladstone O'Brien, a Detroit insurance salesman, and Florence (née Calkins). As a child, she was often ill, later saying, "I had every disease a child can catch, sometimes two or three of them at once." Her parents separated when Ellis was 10 years old, reportedly "with the understanding that during the summer months the children ... were to remain with their mother and the father was to keep them during the school year". Her childhood activities included singing and dancing, and she studied French and German.

Ellis took the surname of Leftwich after her mother married Alexander Leftwich, a New York producer of musical shows. The marriage was unhappy and Ellis was exposed to many family arguments between her temperamental mother and stepfather.

Ellis attended Brantwood Hall School and Gardner School for Girls. At the age of 13, she persuaded her mother and stepfather to allow her to appear on stage with a theatrical stock company during her summer vacation from school. The engagement extended beyond the start of the school year, and Ellis was happy to travel with the stock company because it brought her away from her tumultuous home life.

== Film ==
After taking a screen test in New York City, Ellis was signed to a contract by Warner Bros. in 1932 at the age of 14. However, she told the studio that she was 16, a lie that was not discovered until 1934. As a minor, she was required to take school classes while working at the Warner Bros. studios.

In 1932, Ellis secured two small parts, both uncredited, in the films Three on a Match and Central Park. That same year, she was the youngest of the 14 girls chosen as WAMPAS Baby Stars. Her first credited role was in the 1933 film The King's Vacation, starring George Arliss and Marjorie Gateson. Ellis appeared in six other films in 1933, including a starring role as James Cagney's love interest in Picture Snatcher, despite her age of 14. Over the next five years, Ellis appeared in more than 30 feature films, most of which were comedies. By 1936, she was playing the female lead in nearly all of her films. Her last feature film appearance, at the age of 21, was in Fugitive at Large in 1939.

== Singing ==
After her work in film, Ellis ventured into music, saying, "I was just getting into a rut in Hollywood ... I want to start a new career—singing." After she sang "You Appeal to Me" in a soundie film in 1941, a review in Billboard commented: "Miss Ellis isn't bad on voice and excells [sic] on appearance. Men will pay attention to her." In 1941, Ellis and Henny Youngman headlined with Blue Barron and his Orchestra at Hamid's Pier in Atlantic City, New Jersey. She also appeared on Broadway in the musical comedy Louisiana Purchase.

== Personal life ==
On July 12, 1941, Ellis married businessman George Thomas O'Maley and settled into private life in Kansas City, Missouri. The O'Maleys had one child, a daughter. Ellis remained married to O'Maley for the remainder of her life, dying of colon cancer on March 26, 1970 in Kansas City at the age of 51.

== Partial filmography ==
- Three on a Match (1932) – Linda
- Central Park (1932) – Vivian (uncredited)
- Lawyer Man (1932) – Law Secretary (uncredited)
- The King's Vacation (1933) – Millicent Everhardt
- 42nd Street (1933) – Secretary (uncredited)
- Elmer, the Great (1933) – Nellie Poole
- Picture Snatcher (1933) – Patricia Nolan
- The Narrow Corner (1933) – Louise Frith
- The World Changes (1933) – Natalie Clinton Nordholm
- Convention City (1933) – Claire Honeywell
- Easy to Love (1934) – Janet
- Harold Teen (1934) – Mimi Snatcher
- Let's Be Ritzy (1934) – Ruth Sterling
- Affairs of a Gentleman (1934) – Jean Sinclair
- Here Comes the Groom (1934) – Patricia Randolph
- The Circus Clown (1934) – Alice
- Side Streets (1934) – Mary Thatcher (scenes deleted)
- Big Hearted Herbert (1934) – Alice Kainess
- The St. Louis Kid (1934) – Ann Reid
- A Night at the Ritz (1935) – Marcia Jaynos
- While the Patient Slept (1935) – March
- Hold 'Em Yale (1935) – Clarice Van Cleve
- Stranded (1935) – Velma Tuthill
- Bright Lights (1935) – Claire Whitmore
- The Case of the Lucky Legs (1935) – Margie Florence Clune
- The Payoff (1935) – Connie
- Freshman Love (1936) – Joan Simpkins
- Boulder Dam (1936) – Ann Vangarick
- Snowed Under (1936) – Pat Quinn
- Postal Inspector (1936) – Connie Larrimore
- Love Begins at 20 (1936) – Lois Gillingwater
- Down the Stretch (1936) – Patricia Barrington
- Sing Me a Love Song (1936) – Jean Martin
- Step Lively, Jeeves! (1937) – Patricia Westley
- Melody for Two (1937) – Gale Starr
- Venus Makes Trouble (1937) – Kay Horner
- Rhythm in the Clouds (1937) – Judy Walker
- Paradise for Two (1937) – Jeannette DuPont
- The Lady in the Morgue (1938) – Kathryn Courtland, a.k.a. Mrs. Sam Taylor
- Romance on the Run (1938) – Dale Harrison
- Block-Heads (1938) (with Laurel and Hardy) – Mrs. Gilbert
- Back Door to Heaven (1939) – Carol Evans
- Fugitive at Large (1939) – Patricia Farrow (final film role)
