= Let's Be Ritzy =

1934 film by Edward Ludwig

- Directed by: Edward Ludwig
- Screenplay by: Harry Sauber; Earle Snell
- Based on: If I Were Rich; 1926 play by William Anthony McGuire
- Produced by: Carl Laemmle, Jr.
- Starring: Lew Ayres; Patricia Ellis; Isabel Jewell; Frank McHugh; Berton Churchill; Robert McWade
- Cinematography: Charles J. Stumar
- Edited by: Milton Carruth
- Music by: Edward Ward
- Production company: Universal Pictures
- Distributed by: Universal Pictures
- Release date: May 1, 1934
- Running time: 68 minutes
- Country: United States
- Language: English

Let's Be Ritzy is a 1934 American pre-Code comedy film directed by Edward Ludwig and written by Harry Sauber and Earle Snell. The film stars Lew Ayres, Patricia Ellis, Isabel Jewell, Frank McHugh, Berton Churchill, and Robert McWade. The film was released on May 1, 1934, by Universal Pictures.

== Plot ==
New York shipping clerk Jimmy Sterling is discouraged about his marriage because his extravagant wife Ruth prefers her job as a stenographer to keeping house and rearing children. When R. M. Pembrook, Jimmy and Ruth's supposedly rich landlord, demands back rent, Jimmy pleads for more time and asks Pembrook to come back that night.

Before Pembrook is to arrive, Jimmy's friend, radio personality Bill Damroy, and Bill's fiancée, Betty Olsen, drop by Jimmy's one-room apartment. Bill suggests to Jimmy that when Pembrook returns, he should try to impress him with talk of stock and bond holdings.

Although skeptical, Jimmy attempts Bill's tactic, making "big money" propositions to an unseen listener, whom he assumes is Pembrook, while shaving in another room. Instead of Pembrook, however, Jimmy is plying his deception on John Splevin, his misanthropic employer, who announces that, because Jimmy apparently has so much money, he won't be getting a raise.

When Pembrook finally arrives, Bill leads him to believe that Jimmy is the son of a wealthy South American rubber magnate and is living in poverty only because he is determined to make his own way. Impressed, Pembrook, who is himself broke and in need of a loan, invites Jimmy and Ruth to his summer home for a weekend party. Claiming that she has to work all weekend, Ruth declines the invitation and suggests that Jimmy take Bill and Betty with him. At that moment, Jimmy notices that Ruth is wearing a new, expensive-looking bracelet but is assured by his wife that the jewels are imitations.

During the party, Pembrook asks Jimmy to become his business partner and then takes him to a quiet spot to talk. There, Jimmy sees Ruth with her boss, wealthy lawyer George Hildreth. After Ruth makes a feeble attempt to explain herself, the lights go out and a scream is heard.

Detectives with flashlights then step in and begin searching for a "society burglar" who has stolen Ruth's bracelet. While the detectives question guests, Splevin, who has come to close out the bankrupt Pembrook, takes the floor and announces that not only is their host broke, but Jimmy, the heir, is really a thirty- dollar-a-week clerk. The detectives then inform Jimmy that Ruth's bracelet was a gift from Hildreth and is worth thousands.

Ruth finally confesses to a mild indiscretion with Hildreth, and an enraged Jimmy screams about her broken promises and begins to pack his bags. Splevin, however, shows up at the house and gives the couple sound advice based on his own failed romantic experiences.

After Jimmy and Ruth reconcile, a more confident Jimmy demands more money and responsibility at work. Impressed by Jimmy's newfound spunk, Splevin accedes, departing as the couple embrace.

== Cast ==
- Lew Ayres as Jimmy Sterling
- Patricia Ellis as Ruth Sterling
- Isabel Jewell as Betty
- Frank McHugh as Bill Damroy Robert
- Berton Churchill as R.M. Pembrook
- Robert McWade as Splevin
- Hedda Hopper as Mrs. Burton
- Addison Richards as Lt. Spaulding
- Clay Clement as Mr. Hildreth
- Adrian Morris as Henry Robert
- Betty Lawford as Mrs. Pembrook
- Lois January as Stenographer
- Craig Reynolds as Clerk
- Jimmy Scott as Clerk
- Dean Benton as Clerk
- Boothe Howard as Cop
- Barry Norton as Rogers
