= Romance on the Run =

1938 film by Gus Meins

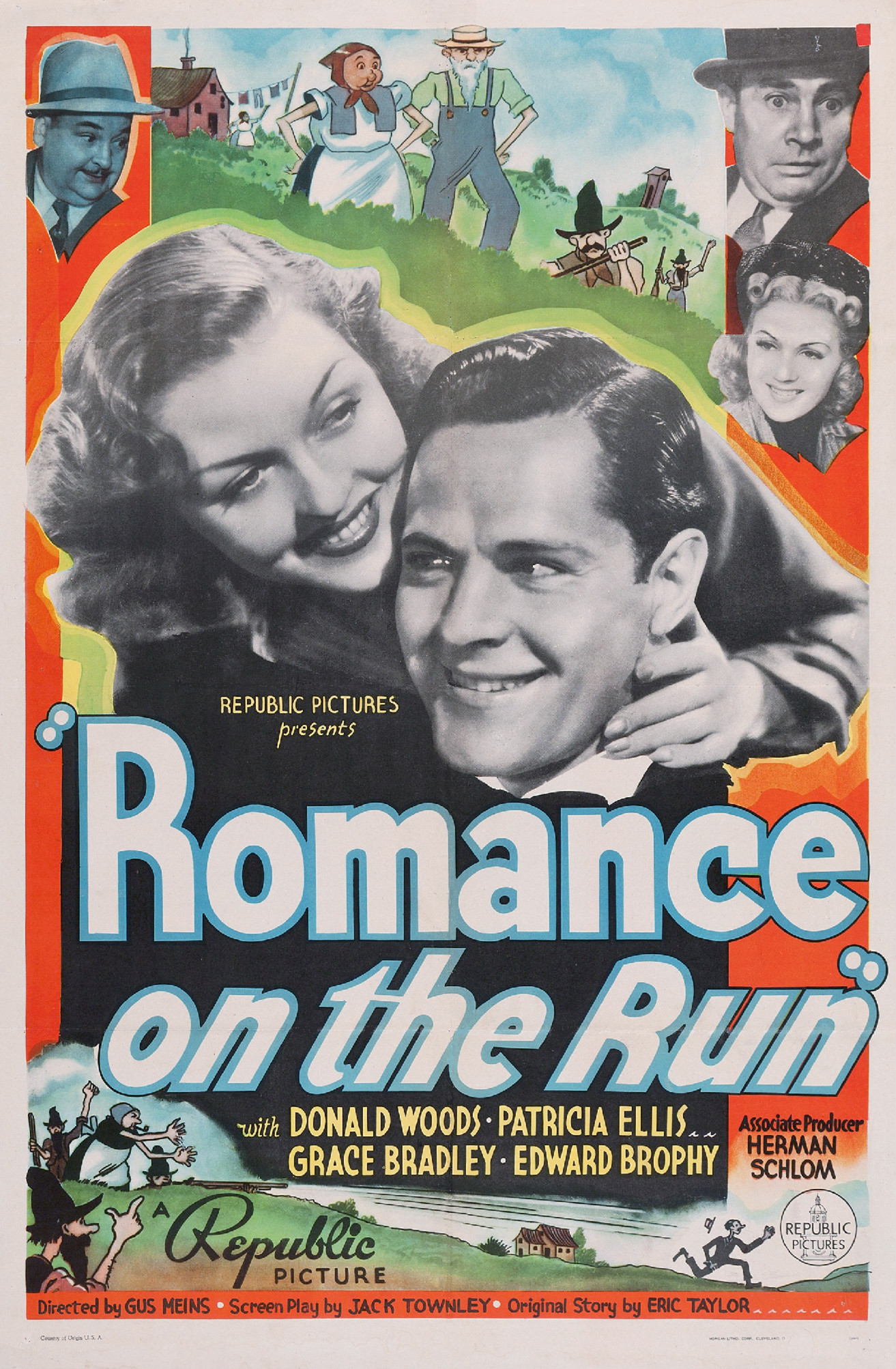
- Film poster
- Directed by: Gus Meins
- Written by: Jack Townley
- Story by: Eric Taylor
- Produced by: Herman Schlom (associate producer)
- Starring: Donald Woods; Patricia Ellis
- Cinematography: Ernest Miller
- Edited by: Ernest J. Nims
- Music by: Alberto Colombo
- Production company: Republic Pictures
- Distributed by: Republic Pictures
- Release date: 11 May 1938
- Running time: 68 minutes (theatrical); 53 minutes (TV reissue)
- Country: United States
- Language: English

Romance on the Run is a 1938 American comedy crime film directed by Gus Meins and starring Donald Woods and Patricia Ellis.

== Plot ==
A very expensive necklace known as the "Czarina's Tears" is stolen from Phelps' jewelry shop. The next morning, Phelps (Granville Bates) goes to see insurance company manager J. W. Ridgeway (Andrew Tombes). Ridgeway is certain Phelps' policy was not renewed, but his young secretary, Miss Dale Harrison (Patricia Ellis), informs him she renewed it while he was away.

Lieutenant Eckhart (William Demarest) wants Ridgeway to leave the case entirely to the police, but Ridgeway hires private investigator Drake (Donald Woods). Drake suspects nightclub singer Lily Lamont (Grace Bradley). Drake introduces Lily to safecracker Charlie Cooper (Craig Reynolds) at the nightclub. They pretend they do not know each other, but they do.

Drake breaks into Cooper's apartment to search for the necklace. Cooper discovers him and holds him at gunpoint, but Drake manages to disarm him and find the necklace. He collects his fee of $10,000, which disgusts Eckhart, who suspects Drake is involved in all the robberies he solves. Phelps shows up to retrieve his necklace, but quickly realizes it is only an imitation. Drake is told the bad news by his sidekick Whitey Whitehouse.

Drake and Whitey rush to the train station (Drake found train tickets in Cooper's apartment) and spot Lily. Meanwhile, Miss Harris also arrives, trying to catch Ridgeway before he leaves on a business trip. Seeing Drake, she follows him to Cincinnati. On the way, she notifies Eckhart by telegram.

In Cincinnati, Lily and Cooper visit fence Mondoon, but the necklace is too dangerous for him to handle. When Drake and Whitey show up, a chase ensues; Drake ends up with the crooks' car - and Lily's suitcase, which contains the jewelry. Now the thieves, as well as Eckhart, pursue Drake, Whitey and Gale, who head to New Orleans (and another fence) in search of the crooks. Drake's trio run out of gas in the middle of nowhere. They see a house and encounter a family of hillbillies. One of the children finds the necklace in a jar of face cream, witnessed only by Gale. Gale takes the necklace and, after trying repeatedly to tell Drake, gives up and hitches a ride, while Eckhart arrests the other four.

Back at the office, Gale switches the fake necklace with the real one, bailing Drake out of trouble. Drake makes an appointment with her at the city hall, implying they are going to get married.

== Cast ==
- Donald Woods as Barry Drake
- Patricia Ellis as Dale Harrison
- Grace Bradley as Lily Lamont
- Edward Brophy as Whitey Whitehouse
- William Demarest as Lieutenant Eckhart
- Craig Reynolds as Charlie Cooper
- Andrew Tombes as J. W. Ridgeway
- Bert Roach as Happy Drunk
- Leon Weaver as Pappy Hatfield
- Edwin Maxwell as Mondoon
- Granville Bates as Mr. Phelps
- Jean Joyce as Dolly
- Georgia Simmons as Ma Hatfield
