= The Merv Griffin Show =

American television talk show

- Genre: Talk show
- Written by: Jerry Bresler; Ernest Chambers; Lyn Duddy
- Directed by: Dick Carson (1972–1986)
- Starring: Merv Griffin
- Announcer: Arthur Treacher (sidekick, 1965–1970); Merv Griffin (1970–1986)
- Music by: Mort Lindsey (bandleader, 1965–1986)
- Country of origin: United States
- Original language: English
- No. of episodes: 4,855

Production
- Executive producers: Merv Griffin; Bob Murphy
- Producers: Ernest Chambers; Peter Barsocchini; David S. Williger; John Scura
- Production locations: New York City (1962–1963, 1965–1970); Los Angeles (1970–1986)
- Running time: 60–90 minutes
- Production companies: NBC (1962–1963); Merv Griffin Productions and Westinghouse Broadcasting (1965–1969); Merv Griffin Productions and CBS (1969–1972); Merv Griffin Productions and Metromedia Producers Corporation (1972–1984); Merv Griffin Enterprises and King World Productions (1984–1986)

Original release
- Network: NBC
- Release: October 1, 1962 – March 29, 1963
- Network: Syndication
- Release: May 10, 1965 – 1969
- Network: CBS
- Release: August 18, 1969 – February 11, 1972
- Network: Syndication
- Release: March 13, 1972 – September 5, 1986

The Merv Griffin Show is an American television talk show starring Merv Griffin. The series had runs on NBC (1962–1963) and CBS (1969–1972), and was also broadcast in first-run syndication from 1965 to 1969 and from 1972 to 1986. A total of 4,855 episodes were produced.

== Series history ==
=== NBC (1962–1963) ===
Griffin received his first talk show from NBC after serving as one of the guest hosts of The Tonight Show during the period between Jack Paar and Johnny Carson. The Merv Griffin Show premiered on October 1, 1962, the same day that Carson began hosting Tonight, and aired weekdays from 2:00 to 2:55 p.m. Eastern. The live colour program combined interviews, music and other entertainment.

The show competed with Password on CBS and was cancelled after one season, with its final broadcast airing March 29, 1963. Griffin later said that NBC received 160,000 letters protesting the cancellation. He returned to NBC in September 1963 as host and producer of the game show Word for Word.

=== Westinghouse (1965–1969) ===
In 1965, Griffin accepted an offer from Westinghouse Broadcasting (Group W) to host a syndicated version of The Merv Griffin Show, with British actor Arthur Treacher as his announcer and sidekick. The program debuted on May 10, 1965, and was taped at the Little Theatre in Times Square. It was distributed as a companion to Westinghouse's The Mike Douglas Show and succeeded syndicated programs hosted by Steve Allen and Regis Philbin. Stations scheduled the program at various times, including daytime and late night.

Treacher introduced Griffin with the phrase "here's the dear boy himself, Merrrr-vyn". Guests ranged from entertainers to political and cultural figures. Among those who appeared during the syndicated period were cellist Pablo Casals, Soviet diplomat Nikolai Fedorenko and philosopher Bertrand Russell, who criticized the Vietnam War during his appearance.

=== CBS (1969–1972) ===
Following the success of the syndicated program, CBS offered Griffin a network series opposite The Tonight Show Starring Johnny Carson. The CBS version premiered on August 18, 1969. Although the program competed directly with Carson, it was unable to overtake Tonight in the ratings.

Griffin's tenure at CBS was marked by disagreements with the network over controversial guests and political content, particularly criticism of the Vietnam War. In April 1970, when Abbie Hoffman appeared on the program wearing a shirt patterned after the American flag, CBS obscured his image during the broadcast after consulting its legal department over concerns that the shirt might violate laws concerning desecration of the flag.

In 1970, Griffin relocated the program from New York's Cort Theatre to CBS Television City in Los Angeles. Treacher did not accompany the show to California, and Griffin subsequently announced the program himself.

By late summer 1971, Griffin sought an early release from his CBS contract. On December 6, 1971, Griffin and CBS announced that the program would leave the network, and the following day Griffin signed an agreement with Metromedia and its production arm, Metromedia Producers Corporation, to return the program to syndication. The final CBS edition aired February 11, 1972.

=== Metromedia (1972–1984) ===
The Metromedia-distributed version debuted on March 13, 1972, returning Griffin to late-afternoon and late-night time slots. Metromedia gave the program clearances on its group of independent stations, including WNEW-TV in New York and KTTV in Los Angeles. Other Metromedia stations carrying the program included outlets in Minneapolis–Saint Paul, Cincinnati and Washington, D.C.

Beginning in 1981, The Merv Griffin Show was reduced from 90 minutes to one hour to accommodate stations that preferred the shorter format.

=== King World and cancellation (1984–1986) ===
King World Productions (now CBS Media Ventures) took over syndication of the program in 1984. King World was already Griffin's syndication partner for Wheel of Fortune and began distributing the revived Jeopardy! in 1984. By 1985, King World was also distributing The Merv Griffin Show.

Metromedia's independent stations continued to carry the program until the stations were sold in 1986 to News Corporation and 20th Century Fox, which used them as the nucleus of the Fox Broadcasting Company. As Fox prepared its own late-night talk show, The Late Show Starring Joan Rivers, the former Metromedia stations dropped Griffin's program soon afterward.

In August 1986, Merv Griffin Enterprises announced that Griffin would end the talk show, which had experienced declining ratings and station coverage in its later years. Griffin's spokesman said that Griffin wanted to pursue other projects, including a proposed big-band variety program, Cocoanut Ballroom. The Merv Griffin Show ended its run on September 5, 1986.

== Overview ==
Griffin was known for conducting lengthy interviews, sometimes lasting 30 minutes or more, rather than limiting guests to brief segments. Over the course of the program, he interviewed more than 25,000 guests. Guests came from entertainment, politics, science, sports and other fields. Among the political and public figures interviewed were Richard Nixon, Robert F. Kennedy, Martin Luther King Jr., Pablo Casals and Bertrand Russell.

Other political and public figures who appeared included Gerald Ford, Jimmy Carter, Ronald Reagan, Rosa Parks, Jonas Salk and Mitsuo Fuchida. Actors and filmmakers who appeared included Orson Welles, John Wayne, Judy Garland, Doris Day, Robert De Niro, Tom Cruise, Sophia Loren, George Clooney, Tom Hanks, Gene Wilder, Francis Ford Coppola, Dustin Hoffman, Clint Eastwood and Grace Kelly. Musical guests included Devo, Aretha Franklin, Bobby Vinton, Andrew Lloyd Webber, Marvin Gaye, Merle Haggard, the Bee Gees and Johnny Cash.

Comedians appearing on the program included George Carlin, Richard Pryor, Andy Kaufman, Steve Martin, Jerry Lewis and Jerry Seinfeld, who made his television debut on the show in 1981. Other guests included Maharishi Mahesh Yogi, Andy Warhol, Norman Rockwell and Salvador Dalí.

Whitney Houston made her U.S. national television debut on the program on June 23, 1983, performing "Home" and a medley with her mother, Cissy Houston.

Sports figures interviewed by Griffin included Muhammad Ali, Joe Namath, Roger Maris, Willie Mays and Reggie Jackson.

Griffin's longtime bandleader was Mort Lindsey. Griffin also frequently performed novelty songs with trumpeter Jack Sheldon.

== Archive ==
Since 2011, Reelin' In the Years Productions has represented the surviving archive of The Merv Griffin Show, comprising more than 2,000 hours of footage.

Footage from Houston's 1983 appearance has subsequently appeared on releases including Whitney Houston: The Deluxe Anniversary Edition and Whitney Houston Live: Her Greatest Performances. The performance also appears in the 2018 documentary Whitney.

== In popular culture ==
Seinfeld spoofed the show in the season nine episode "The Merv Griffin Show", in which Cosmo Kramer finds discarded furnishings from the show's set, installs them in his apartment and begins pretending to host his own talk show.

Andy Kaufman's appearance on the show was depicted in the 1999 biographical film Man on the Moon, with Griffin portrayed by actor Mike Villani.

The Merv Griffin Show was parodied on SCTV, with Rick Moranis portraying Griffin. One sketch, titled "The Merv Griffith Show", combined parodies of Griffin's program and The Andy Griffith Show, with Moranis portraying Griffin as a version of Andy Griffith. Another sketch combined the program with elements of 2001: A Space Odyssey and Close Encounters of the Third Kind.

== Legacy ==
The Merv Griffin Show became one of the longest-running American television talk shows, airing in several incarnations for more than two decades. Broadcasting & Cable later identified Griffin's contribution to the daytime talk-show format as an important part of his television legacy, alongside his role in the growth of first-run syndication.

The program also preserved extensive interviews and performances by entertainers, political figures, writers and other public figures from the 1960s through the 1980s. More than 2,000 hours of surviving footage are represented by Reelin' In the Years Productions. The show's continuing recognition has also been reflected in later television parodies, including SCTV and the 1997 Seinfeld episode "The Merv Griffin Show".

== Awards and nominations ==
Year	Result	Award	Category	Recipient	Episode
1971	Nominated	Golden Globe Award	Best TV Actor – Musical/Comedy	Merv Griffin	
1970	Nominated	Emmy Award	Outstanding Achievement in Music Direction of a Variety, Musical or Dramatic Program	Mort Lindsey	Episode from Las Vegas featuring Chuck Connors, Joey Heatherton, Buddy Greco and Jack E. Leonard
1971	Nominated	Emmy Award	Outstanding Achievement in Music Direction of a Variety, Musical or Dramatic Program	Mort Lindsey	"Big Band Salute" (Parts 1 and 2)
1976	Nominated	Emmy Award	Outstanding Individual Achievement in Daytime Programming	Richard W. Wilson	Episode with Tony Bennett, Peggy Lee and Fred Astaire
1974	Nominated	Daytime Emmy Awards	Best Individual Director for a Talk, Service or Variety Program	Ron Appling	Episode with Clint Eastwood, Forrest Tucker and Stanley Myron Handelman
1974	Nominated	Daytime Emmy Awards	Best Host or Hostess in a Talk, Service, or Variety Series	Merv Griffin	
1974	Won	Daytime Emmy Awards	Outstanding Talk, Service or Variety Series	Bob Murphy	
1974	Won	Daytime Emmy Awards	Best Writing for a Talk, Service or Variety Program	Tony Garafalo, Bob Murphy, Merv Griffin	Episode with Billie Jean King, Mark Spitz, Hank Aaron and Johnny Unitas
1974	Won	Daytime Emmy Awards	Best Individual Director for a Talk, Service or Variety Program	Dick Carson	Episode with Rosemary Clooney, Helen O'Connell, Fran Warren and Kay Starr
1975	Won	Daytime Emmy Awards	Outstanding Individual Director for a Daytime Variety Program	Dick Carson	Episode with Robert Goulet, Louis Prima and Shecky Greene
1976	Nominated	Daytime Emmy Awards	Outstanding Host or Hostess in a Talk, Service or Variety Series	Merv Griffin	
1977	Nominated	Daytime Emmy Awards	Outstanding Individual Director for a Daytime Variety Program	Dick Carson	"Merv Griffin in Israel"
1977	Nominated	Daytime Emmy Awards	Outstanding Host or Hostess in a Talk, Service or Variety Series	Merv Griffin	
1977	Won	Daytime Emmy Awards	Outstanding Talk, Service or Variety Series	Bob Murphy	
1978	Nominated	Daytime Emmy Awards	Outstanding Talk, Service or Variety Series	Bob Murphy	
1981	Won	Daytime Emmy Awards	Outstanding Variety Series	Peter Barsocchini	
1982	Won	Daytime Emmy Awards	Outstanding Host or Hostess in a Variety Series	Merv Griffin	
1983	Won	Daytime Emmy Awards	Outstanding Variety Series	Peter Barsocchini	
1983	Won	Daytime Emmy Awards	Outstanding Individual Direction for a Variety Show	Dick Carson	
1984	Won	Daytime Emmy Awards	Outstanding Variety Series	Bob Murphy and Peter Barsocchini	
1984	Won	Daytime Emmy Awards	Outstanding Host or Hostess in a Variety Series	Merv Griffin	
1985	Won	Daytime Emmy Awards	Outstanding Directing in a Talk/Service Show	Dick Carson	

== See also ==
- List of late night network TV programs
