= Picture Snatcher =

1933 film by Lloyd Bacon

- Directed by: Lloyd Bacon
- Written by: Daniel Ahern (story); Allen Rivkin (adaptation); P. J. Wolfson (adaptation); Ben Markson (dialogue)
- Starring: James Cagney; Ralph Bellamy; Patricia Ellis; Alice White
- Cinematography: Sol Polito
- Edited by: William Holmes
- Production company: Warner Bros. Pictures
- Release dates: May 11, 1933 (Los Angeles); May 17, 1933 (New York)
- Running time: 76 minutes
- Country: United States
- Language: English

Picture Snatcher is a 1933 American pre-Code comedy-drama film directed by Lloyd Bacon and starring James Cagney as a reformed gangster who pursues his dream to be a photojournalist.

The film is based on a semiautobiographical story written by Daniel Ahern, a former underworld figure who had also been a tabloid photographer. The story is also the basis of the 1942 film Escape from Crime.

== Plot ==
After leaving prison, gang lord Danny Kean shocks everyone by quitting crime. He cedes control of his gang to Jerry "the Mug". Having always dreamed of becoming a news reporter, Danny finds Al McLean, city editor of the sleazy Graphic News, who had offered Danny a future job while he was imprisoned. Al is reluctant to hire Danny, but Danny seizes an opportunity to exploit the hottest news story in town, which concerns a fireman whose wife and her lover were killed in a fire. Danny poses as an insurance adjuster and steals the fireman's wedding photo. As a result of the exclusive, Danny is made a staff photographer.

Danny dates journalism student Pat Nolan, but Al's reporter girlfriend Allison also wants Danny's affections. Danny discovers that Pat's father Casey Nolan is the police lieutenant who had shot and arrested him before his prison stint. Nolan orders his daughter to stop seeing Danny, but Danny arranges for another newspaper to print a flattering story about Nolan that leads to his promotion to the rank of captain.

When a woman is scheduled to be executed at Sing Sing, the Graphic News is the only paper not invited to cover the event. But with Nolan's help, Danny is permitted into the press room to witness the electrocution. With a concealed camera strapped to his ankle, Danny snaps a photo of the woman in the electric chair (echoing the real-life picture taken of murderer Ruth Snyder in 1928). When another reporter discovers the camera and informs the guards, a wild car chase ensues, but Danny delivers the photo to the Graphic News and is handsomely rewarded. The photograph is printed on the front page. However, Pat dumps him after her father is demoted for having permitted Danny to enter the press room. Danny is distraught and admits that he had not considered how his stunt would affect Pat.

Al arranges for Danny to hide from the police at Allison's apartment, as she is leaving town on assignment. Allison returns early and attempts to seduce Danny, who resists her advances. Al finds Allison and Danny in a compromising position and thinks that Danny is involved with his girlfriend, and the men exchange punches. Danny disappears from his usual circles and becomes a drunkard to drown his sorrows. Al finds him and apologizes, informing Danny that he has quit the newspaper.

The leader of Danny's old gang, Jerry the Mug, has killed two during a robbery and is the target of a manhunt. If Danny or Al can find Jerry, the scoop will lead to jobs at any paper in town. Danny finds Jerry's hideout and pretends that he has come to check on him out of concern. The police locate the hideout, and a violent gun battle ensues, during which Danny snaps photos of Jerry as he is shot dead by the police. Danny lies to the police, telling them that he had been working undercover for Nolan, so that Nolan can be promoted to the rank of captain once again. Danny and Pat are reunited, and Danny and Al are able to secure jobs at the more reputable Daily Record.

== Cast ==
- James Cagney as Danny Kean
- Ralph Bellamy as J.R. "Al" McLean
- Patricia Ellis as Patricia "Pat" Nolan
- Alice White as Allison
- Ralf Harolde as Jerry "the Mug"
- Robert Emmett O'Connor as Lieutenant/Captain Casey Nolan
- Robert Barrat as Grover
- G. Pat Collins as Hennessy the Fireman
- Sterling Holloway as journalism student (uncredited)
- Arthur Vinton as John
- Tom Wilson as Leo
- George Chandler as Reporter
- William H. Strauss as Tailor

== Production ==
Patricia Ellis, who plays Cagney's love interest Pat Nolan, was only 14 years old when the film was released. As Ellis had lied about her age when she signed her Warner Bros. contract in 1932, the studio believed her to be two years older than she actually was.

In preparation for the role, James Cagney spent a day in the office of a Los Angeles newspaper learning about the editorial, photographic and typesetting processes.

During filming, Alice White was knocked unconscious and nearly lost teeth when a misplaced punch from Cagney struck her in the head.

== Reception ==
In a contemporary review for The New York Times, critic Mordaunt Hall praised Cagney's performance: "[T]he unfailing James Cagney lends his vigorous presence. This player of belligerent roles is in his element here and often his actions appear so spontaneous that they look to be thought up on the spur of the moment."

Reviewer John Scott of the Los Angeles Times wrote: "'Picture Snatcher' is another of those films which reveal that 'life in the raw is seldom mild, but when has Cagney done a parlor drama on the screen? Both the action and dialogue are snappy, although in different ways. Lloyd Bacon's efficient direction deserves special mention."

== Radio adaptation ==
A radio adaptation of Picture Snatcher, featuring Cagney in the lead role, aired on Los Angeles station KFWB on May 10, 1933, the night before the film opened in the area.

== Home media ==
Picture Snatcher was released on DVD by Warner Home Video in 2008 with an accompanying audio commentary track.
