= Dick Carson =

American television director (1929–2021)

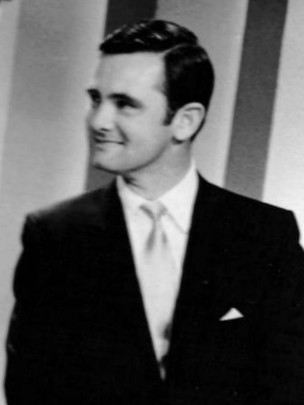
- Carson in 1967
- Born: Richard Charles Carson; June 4, 1929; Clarinda, Iowa, U.S.
- Died: December 19, 2021 (aged 92); Studio City, Los Angeles, California, U.S.
- Occupation: Television director
- Years active: c. 1962–2000
- Spouses: Patricia Ann Gundy (m. 1952; died 1986); Karlyn Kuper (m. 1988)
- Children: 4
- Relatives: Johnny Carson (brother)

Richard Charles Carson (June 4, 1929 – December 19, 2021) was an American television director. He was a five-time Emmy Award winner, having directed shows including The Tonight Show, Wheel of Fortune, and The Merv Griffin Show. He moved to Norfolk, Nebraska, in 1934 with his family, and graduated from Norfolk High School in 1947. Carson later attended the University of Nebraska and joined the United States Navy and became an officer. In 1952, Carson was stationed in San Diego, California, as an ensign. He was the younger brother of comedian and television talk show host Johnny Carson.

On December 19, 2021, Carson died after a brief illness in Studio City, Los Angeles, at the age of 92.
