= Step Lively, Jeeves! =

1937 film by Eugene Forde

- Theatrical release poster
- Directed by: Eugene Forde
- Screenplay by: Frank Fenton; Lynn Root
- Story by: Frances Hyland
- Produced by: John Stone
- Starring: Arthur Treacher; Patricia Ellis; Robert Kent; Alan Dinehart; George Givot; Helen Flint
- Cinematography: Daniel B. Clark
- Edited by: Fred Allen
- Music by: Samuel Kaylin
- Distributed by: 20th Century-Fox
- Release date: April 1, 1937
- Running time: 69 minutes
- Country: United States
- Language: English

Step Lively, Jeeves! is a 1937 American comedy film directed by Eugene Forde, written by Frank Fenton and Lynn Root, and starring Arthur Treacher as P. G. Wodehouse's Jeeves alongside Patricia Ellis, Robert Kent, Alan Dinehart, George Givot and Helen Flint. The film was released on April 1, 1937, by 20th Century-Fox.

The character of Jeeves' master, Bertie Wooster, does not appear. The film is not based on any Jeeves story, and portrays Jeeves as a naive bumbler (which is not how he is portrayed by Wodehouse in the novels and short stories about him).

== Plot ==
Two swindlers con Jeeves (portrayed by Arthur Treacher), claiming that he's the descendant of Sir Francis Drake, and has a fortune waiting for him in America. Arriving in New York, Jeeves gets mixed up with gangsters.

== Cast ==
- Arthur Treacher as Jeeves
- Patricia Ellis as Patricia Westley
- Robert Kent as Gerry Townsend
- Alan Dinehart as Hon. Cedric B. Cromwell
- George Givot as Prince Boris Caminov
- Helen Flint as Babe
- John Harrington as Barney Ross
- George Cooper as Slug
- Arthur Housman as Max
- Max Wagner as Joey
- Franklin Pangborn as Gaston
- Phyllis Barry as Mrs. Tremaine
- George Cowl as Inspector
