= The Battle of Paris =

1929 film

- Theatrical release poster
- Directed by: Robert Florey
- Written by: Gene Markey
- Produced by: Monta Bell
- Starring: Gertrude Lawrence; Charles Ruggles; Walter Petrie; Gladys DuBois; Arthur Treacher; Joe King
- Cinematography: George J. Folsey
- Music by: Music: Cole Porter; Jay Gorney; Dick Howard; Lyrics: Howard Dietz; Cole Porter
- Distributed by: Paramount Pictures
- Release dates: November 30, 1929 (U.S.); December 28, 1930 (Finland)
- Running time: 80 minutes
- Country: United States
- Language: English

The Battle of Paris (a.k.a. The Gay Lady) is a 1929 American pre-Code musical film.

== Plot ==
The Battle of Paris is a movie set during World War 1. The film follows a singer named Gertrude Lawrence who steals from an artist from America named Tony. After this act of thievery, the two fall in love

== Cast ==
- Gertrude Lawrence – Georgie
- Charles Ruggles – Zizi
- Walter Petrie – Tony
- Gladys DuBois – Suzanne
- Arthur Treacher – Harry (film debut)
- Joe King – Jack
- Luis Alberni – (uncredited)

== Production ==
The Battle of Paris was released on November 30, 1929 in the US. Filming locations for this film include Kaufman Astoria Studios and Paramount Studios, Astoria in Queens, New York. Production crew includes Robert Florey as the Director and Gene Markey as the Writer. With Cinematography by George J. Folsey and produced by Monta Bell.

== Songs ==
- "When I Am Housekeeping For You"

Words by Howard Dietz (as Dick Howard)
Music by Jay Gorney
Copyright 1929 by Spier and Coslow Inc

- "Here Comes The Bandwagon"

Words and Music by Cole Porter
Copyright 1929 by Harms Inc.

- "What Makes My Baby Blue"

Words by Howard Dietz (as Dick Howard)
Music by Jay Gorney
Copyright 1929 by Spier and Coslow Inc

- "They All Fall In Love"

Words and Music by Cole Porter
Copyright 1929 by Harms Inc.
Sung by Gertrude Lawrence

== See also ==
- List of early sound feature films (1926–1929)
