= List of films set in the Southern United States =

The following is a partial chronological list of movies set in the Southern United States:

== 1890s ==
- Down in Dixie, 1898
- Loading a Mississippi Steamboat, 1898
- Way Down South, 1898

== 1900s ==
- Arrival of Rex, 1902
- Mardi Gras Parade, 1902
- In Old Kentucky, 1909

== 1910s ==
- The Girl Spy Before Vicksburg, 1911
- A Gentleman from Mississippi, 1914
- The Birth of a Nation, 1915
- The Coward, 1915
- Uncle Tom's Cabin, 1918
- Almost a Husband, 1919
- John Petticoats, 1919

== 1920s ==
- The Copperhead, 1920
- Huckleberry Finn, 1920
- Tol'able David, 1921
- Our Hospitality, 1923
- The White Rose, 1923
- America, 1924
- The General, 1926
- Court Martial, 1928
- Hallelujah, 1929
- Show Boat, 1929
- Chiefs (miniseries)

== 1930s ==
- Abraham Lincoln, 1930
- Tol'able David, 1930
- Huckleberry Finn, 1931
- Secret Service, 1931
- I Am a Fugitive from a Chain Gang, 1932
- The Cabin in the Cotton, 1932
- The Wet Parade, 1932
- The Story of Temple Drake, 1933
- Bed of Roses, 1933
- Belle of the Nineties, 1934
- It Happened One Night, 1934
- Judge Priest, 1934
- Operator 13, 1934
- The World Moves On, 1934
- The Little Colonel, 1935
- The Littlest Rebel, 1935
- Naughty Marietta, 1935
- So Red the Rose, 1935
- Steamboat Round the Bend, 1935
- General Spanky, 1936
- The Green Pastures, 1936
- Hearts in Bondage, 1936
- The Prisoner of Shark Island, 1936
- Show Boat, 1936
- They Won't Forget, 1937
- The Buccaneer, 1938
- The Cowboy and the Lady, 1938
- Jezebel, 1938
- Kentucky, 1938
- The Adventures of Huckleberry Finn, 1939
- The Cat and the Canary, 1939
- Gone with the Wind, 1939
- Man of Conquest, 1939
- Zenobia, 1939

== 1940s ==
- The Howards of Virginia, 1940
- Virginia City, 1940
- Belle Starr, 1941
- The Little Foxes, 1941
- Sergeant York, 1941
- Swamp Water, 1941
- Tobacco Road, 1941
- The Loves of Edgar Allan Poe, 1942
- Reap the Wild Wind, 1942
- Tennessee Johnson, 1942
- Son of Dracula, 1943
- The Adventures of Mark Twain, 1944
- Christmas Holiday, 1944
- Go Down, Death!, 1944
- The Mummy's Curse, 1944
- Wilson, 1944
- The Bride Wore Boots, 1945
- Leave Her to Heaven, 1945
- The Jolson Story, 1946
- Song of the South, 1946
- The Yearling, 1946
- Dead Reckoning, 1947
- Another Part of the Forest, 1948
- Key Largo, 1948
- Louisiana Story, 1948
- Moonrise, 1948
- A Southern Yankee, 1948
- All the King's Men, 1949
- The Fighting Kentuckian, 1949
- Intruder in the Dust, 1949
- Pinky, 1949
- South of St. Louis, 1949

== 1950s ==
- The Glass Menagerie, 1950
- Panic in the Streets, 1950
- Adventures of Captain Fabian, 1951
- Drums in the Deep South, 1951
- I'd Climb the Highest Mountain, 1951
- Show Boat, 1951
- A Streetcar Named Desire, 1951
- Lure of the Wilderness, 1952
- The Member of the Wedding, 1952
- Ruby Gentry, 1952
- Stars and Stripes Forever, 1952
- The Story of Will Rogers, 1952
- Bright Road, 1953
- Captain John Smith and Pocahontas, 1953
- The Mississippi Gambler, 1953
- The President's Lady, 1953
- Seminole, 1953
- The Sun Shines Bright, 1953
- Carmen Jones, 1954
- The Night of the Hunter, 1955
- The Phenix City Story, 1955
- Prince of Players, 1955
- Queen Bee, 1955
- Baby Doll, 1956
- Giant, 1956
- The Great Locomotive Chase, 1956
- The Kettles in the Ozarks, 1956
- The Searchers, 1956
- April Love, 1957
- Band of Angels, 1957
- Drango, 1957
- A Face in the Crowd, 1957
- Old Yeller, 1957
- Tammy and the Bachelor, 1957
- The Three Faces of Eve, 1957
- The Buccaneer, 1958
- Cat on a Hot Tin Roof, 1958
- The Defiant Ones, 1958
- God's Little Acre, 1958
- King Creole, 1958
- The Long, Hot Summer, 1958
- No Time for Sergeants, 1958
- Thunder Road, 1958
- Wind Across the Everglades, 1958
- The Alligator People, 1959
- Attack of the Giant Leeches, 1959
- A Hole in the Head, 1959
- The Horse Soldiers, 1959
- John Paul Jones, 1959
- Porgy and Bess, 1959
- The Sound and the Fury, 1959
- Suddenly, Last Summer, 1959

== 1960s ==
- The Adventures of Huckleberry Finn, 1960
- "Chiefs (miniseries)
- The Alamo, 1960
- The Fugitive Kind, 1960
- Inherit the Wind, 1960
- The Jailbreakers, 1960
- Where the Boys Are, 1960
- Wild River, 1960
- Angel Baby, 1961
- Claudelle Inglish, 1961
- The Dead One, 1961
- Sanctuary, 1961
- Summer and Smoke, 1961
- Tammy Tell Me True, 1961
- Wild in the Country, 1961
- Airborne, 1962
- Cape Fear, 1962
- Follow That Dream, 1962
- The Intruder, 1962
- The Miracle Worker, 1962
- Period of Adjustment, 1962
- The Streets of Greenwood, 1962
- Sweet Bird of Youth, 1962
- To Kill a Mockingbird, 1962
- Walk on the Wild Side, 1962
- Flipper, 1963
- Gone Are the Days!, 1963
- Soldier in the Rain, 1963
- Blood Feast, 1963
- Toys in the Attic, 1963
- Black Like Me, 1964
- Flipper's New Adventure, 1964
- Goldfinger, 1964
- Hush...Hush, Sweet Charlotte, 1964
- Kissin' Cousins, 1964
- Two Thousand Maniacs!, 1964
- The Cincinnati Kid, 1965
- Shenandoah, 1965
- The Black Klansman, 1966
- Birds Do It, 1966
- The Chase, 1966
- Frankie and Johnny, 1966
- This Property Is Condemned, 1966
- Clambake, 1967
- The Gruesome Twosome, 1967
- Cool Hand Luke, 1967
- The Flim-Flam Man, 1967
- Hotel, 1967
- Bonnie and Clyde, 1967
- Hurry Sundown, 1967
- In the Heat of the Night, 1967
- Reflections in a Golden Eye, 1967
- Finian's Rainbow, 1968
- The Heart Is a Lonely Hunter, 1968
- The Devil's 8, 1969
- The Wild Bunch, 1969
- Easy Rider, 1969
- The Reivers, 1969
- True Grit, 1969

== 1970s ==
- I Walk the Line, 1970
- Last of the Mobile Hot Shots, 1970
- The Liberation of L.B. Jones, 1970
- The Moonshine War, 1970
- Brewster McCloud, 1970
- Suppose They Gave a War and Nobody Came, 1970
- ...tick...tick...tick..., 1970
- WUSA, 1970
- The Beguiled, 1971
- Fantasia Among the Squares, 1971
- The Last Picture Show, 1971
- Swamp Girl, 1971
- The Tender Warrior, 1971
- Goodbye Uncle Tom, 1971
- Boxcar Bertha, 1972
- The Getaway, 1972
- Deliverance, 1972
- Fear Is the Key, 1972
- Frogs, 1972
- The Legend of Boggy Creek, 1972
- No Drums, No Bugles, 1972
- Sounder, 1972
- Tomorrow, 1972
- Welcome Home Soldier Boys, 1972
- The Last American Hero, 1973
- Steel Arena, 1973
- Live and Let Die, 1973
- Walking Tall, 1973
- White Lightning, 1973
- The Autobiography of Miss Jane Pittman, 1974
- Axe, 1974
- Buster and Billie, 1974
- Conrack, 1974
- 'Gator Bait, 1974
- The Klansman, 1974
- The Longest Yard, 1974
- Macon County Line, 1974
- The Sugarland Express, 1974
- Thieves Like Us, 1974
- The Texas Chain Saw Massacre, 1974
- Where the Lilies Bloom, 1974
- Where the Red Fern Grows, 1974
- The Drowning Pool, 1975
- Hard Times, 1975
- Moonrunners, 1975
- Nashville, 1975
- Night Moves, 1975
- Return to Macon County, 1975
- Walking Tall Part 2, 1975
- W.W. and the Dixie Dancekings, 1975
- Fighting Mad, 1976
- Gator, 1976
- Ode to Billy Joe, 1976
- The Outlaw Josey Wales, 1976
- The Savage Bees, 1976
- Harlan County, USA, 1976
- The Town That Dreaded Sundown, 1976
- Squirm, 1976
- Stay Hungry, 1976
- Eaten Alive, 1977
- Rolling Thunder, 1977
- Crime Busters, 1977
- The Rescuers, 1977
- Return to Boggy Creek, 1977
- Scalpel, 1977
- September 30, 1955, 1977
- Smokey and the Bandit, 1977
- Walking Tall: Final Chapter, 1977
- Casey's Shadow, 1978
- The Great Bank Hoax, 1978
- Odds and Evens, 1978
- Pretty Baby, 1978
- Summer of My German Soldier, 1978
- Gal YoungUn, 1979
- The Great Santini, 1979
- Norma Rae, 1979
- The Sheriff and the Satellite Kid, 1979
- Wise Blood, 1979

== 1980s ==
- Brubaker, 1980
- Urban Cowboy, 1980
- Smokey and the Bandit II, 1980
- Coal Miner's Daughter, 1980
- Body Heat, 1981
- Honky Tonk Freeway, 1981
- The Night the Lights Went Out in Georgia, 1981
- Raggedy Man, 1981
- Sharky's Machine, 1981
- Southern Comfort, 1981
- Vernon, Florida, 1981
- Porky's, 1981
- Cat People, 1982
- Six Pack, 1982
- The Big Chill, 1983
- Cross Creek, 1983
- Go for It, 1983
- The Lords of Discipline, 1983
- The Outsiders, 1983
- Scarface, 1983
- Stroker Ace, 1983
- Tender Mercies, 1983
- Smokey and the Bandit Part 3, 1983
- Rumble Fish, 1983
- Porky's II: The Next Day, 1983
- A Flash of Green, 1984
- Paris, Texas, 1984
- Places in the Heart, 1984
- A Soldier's Story, 1984
- Tank, 1984
- Cocoon, 1985
- Porky's Revenge, 1985
- Private Resort, 1985
- Miami Supercops, 1985
- The Color Purple, 1985
- Belizaire the Cajun, 1986
- Crimes of the Heart, 1986
- Down by Law, 1986
- The Texas Chainsaw Massacre 2, 1986
- True Stories, 1986
- Angel Heart, 1987
- The Big Easy, 1987
- Matewan, 1987
- Shy People, 1987
- Miami Connection, 1987
- Bull Durham, 1988
- Biloxi Blues, 1988
- Mississippi Burning, 1988
- School Daze, 1988
- Track 29, 1988
- Chattahoochee, 1989
- Driving Miss Daisy, 1989
- Fletch Lives, 1989
- Miss Firecracker, 1989
- Mystery Train, 1989
- Steel Magnolias, 1989
- Shag, 1989
- Heart of Dixie, 1989
- Tennessee Waltz, 1989

== 1990s ==
- Decoration Day, 1990
- Leatherface: The Texas Chainsaw Massacre III, 1990
- The Long Walk Home, 1990
- Wild at Heart, 1990
- Texasville, 1990
- Cry-Baby, 1990
- Cape Fear, 1991
- Daughters of the Dust, 1991
- Doc Hollywood, 1991
- Fried Green Tomatoes, 1991
- JFK, 1991
- The Man in the Moon, 1991
- Mississippi Masala, 1991
- My Girl, 1991
- Paradise, 1991
- The Prince of Tides, 1991
- Slacker, 1991
- The Gun in Betty Lou's Handbag, 1992
- Malcolm X, 1992
- My Cousin Vinny, 1992
- One False Move, 1992
- Passion Fish, 1992
- The Adventures of Huck Finn, 1993
- The Firm, 1993
- Dazed and Confused, 1993
- Hard Target, 1993
- Morning Glory, 1993
- The Pelican Brief, 1993
- Rich in Love, 1993
- Ruby in Paradise, 1993
- Sommersby, 1993
- The Thing Called Love, 1993
- Undercover Blues, 1993
- The Client, 1994
- Forrest Gump, 1994
- Interview with the Vampire, 1994
- Jason's Lyric, 1994
- Nell, 1994
- River of Grass, 1994
- The War, 1994
- The Yearling, 1994
- Candyman: Farewell to the Flesh, 1995
- The Grass Harp, 1995
- The Journey of August King, 1995
- Just Cause, 1995
- Something to Talk About, 1995
- Albino Alligator, 1996
- The Delta, 1996
- Ghosts of Mississippi, 1996
- Heaven's Prisoners, 1996
- Last Dance, 1996
- Last Man Standing, 1996
- Sling Blade, 1996
- A Time to Kill, 1996
- The Apostle, 1997
- Eve's Bayou, 1997
- First Love, Last Rites, 1997
- Kiss the Girls, 1997
- Midnight in the Garden of Good and Evil, 1997
- The Rainmaker, 1997
- Rosewood, 1997
- Ulee's Gold, 1997
- The Devil's Advocate, 1998
- Down in the Delta, 1998
- Hope Floats, 1998
- Shadrach, 1998
- The Truman Show, 1998
- The Waterboy, 1998
- Wild Things, 1998
- Cookie's Fortune, 1999
- Crazy in Alabama, 1999
- The Green Mile, 1999
- The Hunley, 1999
- Life, 1999
- October Sky, 1999
- Varsity Blues, 1999

== 2000s ==
- Big Momma's House, 2000
- George Washington, 2000
- The Gift, 2000
- The Legend of Bagger Vance, 2000
- My Dog Skip, 2000
- O Brother, Where Art Thou?, 2000
- Remember the Titans, 2000
- The Patriot, 2000
- Where the Heart Is, 2000
- The Accountant, 2001
- A Walk to Remember, 2001
- Children on Their Birthdays, 2002
- Daddy and Them, 2001
- Divine Secrets of the Ya-Ya Sisterhood, 2002
- Drumline, 2002
- Monster's Ball, 2002
- The Rosa Parks Story, 2002
- Sunshine State, 2002
- Sweet Home Alabama, 2002
- Voodoo Tailz, 2002
- 2 Fast 2 Furious, 2003
- All the Real Girls, 2003
- Big Fish, 2003
- Cold Mountain, 2003
- House Of 1000 Corpses, 2003
- Monster, 2003
- Out of Time, 2003
- Radio, 2003
- The Texas Chainsaw Massacre, 2003
- Wrong Turn, 2003
- The Alamo, 2004
- Chrystal, 2004
- Friday Night Lights, 2004
- The Ladykillers, 2004
- A Love Song for Bobby Long, 2004
- Miracle Run, 2004
- The Notebook, 2004
- Ray, 2004
- Undertow, 2004
- Walking Tall, 2004
- 2001 Maniacs, 2005
- Beauty Shop, 2005
- Because of Winn-Dixie, 2005
- The Descent, 2005
- The Dukes of Hazzard, 2005
- Elizabethtown, 2005
- Forty Shades of Blue, 2005
- The Devil's Rejects, 2005
- Hustle & Flow, 2005
- Junebug, 2005
- Loggerheads, 2005
- The Skeleton Key, 2005
- All the King's Men, 2006
- Death Proof, 2006
- ATL, 2006
- Borat: Cultural Learnings of America for Make Benefit Glorious Nation of Kazakhstan, 2006
- Déjà Vu, 2006
- Hatchet, 2006
- Facing the Giants, 2006
- Glory Road, 2006
- The Hawk Is Dying, 2006
- Miami Vice, 2006
- Talladega Nights: The Ballad of Ricky Bobby, 2006
- Black Snake Moan, 2007
- Constellation, 2007
- The Great Debaters, 2007
- Hounddog, 2007
- Shotgun Stories, 2007
- No Country for Old Men, 2007
- Waitress, 2007
- War Eagle, Arkansas, 2007
- Ballast, 2008
- The Curious Case of Benjamin Button, 2008
- Fireproof, 2008
- Harold & Kumar Escape from Guantanamo Bay, 2008
- Nights in Rodanthe, 2008
- The Secret Life of Bees, 2008
- Tennessee, 2008
- 12 Rounds, 2009
- Alabama Moon, 2009
- Bad Lieutenant: Port of Call New Orleans, 2009
- The Blind Side, 2009
- Brüno, 2009
- Crazy Heart, 2009
- Trash Humpers, 2009
- In the Electric Mist, 2009
- Little Chenier, 2009
- Mississippi Damned, 2009
- The New Daughter, 2009
- The Princess and the Frog, 2009

== 2010s ==
- Country Strong, 2010
- Dear John, 2010
- Dirty Girl, 2010
- The Last Song, 2010
- Main Street, 2010
- Tucker & Dale vs. Evil, 2010
- Winter's Bone, 2010
- The Conspirator, 2011
- Dolphin Tale, 2011
- Drive Angry, 2011
- Footloose, 2011
- The Help, 2011
- Joyful Noise, 2011
- Straw Dogs, 2011
- The Tree of Life, 2011
- Killer Joe, 2011
- Beasts of the Southern Wild, 2012
- Come Morning, 2012
- Django Unchained, 2012
- Lawless, 2012
- The Lucky One, 2012
- Mighty Fine (2012)
- Mud, 2012
- The Paperboy, 2012
- Spring Breakers, 2012
- 12 Years a Slave, 2013
- As I Lay Dying, 2013
- Beautiful Creatures, 2013
- Safe Haven, 2013
- Joe, 2013
- Dallas Buyers Club, 2013
- The Best of Me, 2014
- Selma, 2014
- The Longest Ride, 2015
- Free State of Jones, 2016
- The Choice, 2016
- Masterminds, 2016
- Midnight Special, 2016
- Moonlight, 2016
- Sophie and the Rising Sun, 2016
- Baby Driver, 2017
- Mudbound, 2017
- The Beguiled, 2017
- Forever My Girl, 2018
- Green Book, 2018
- The Beach Bum, 2019
- Just Mercy, 2019
- Harriet, 2019

== 2020s ==
- Where the Crawdads Sing, 2022
- The Starling Girl, 2023
- Sinners, 2025
