= Brenda Fowler =

American actress and writer

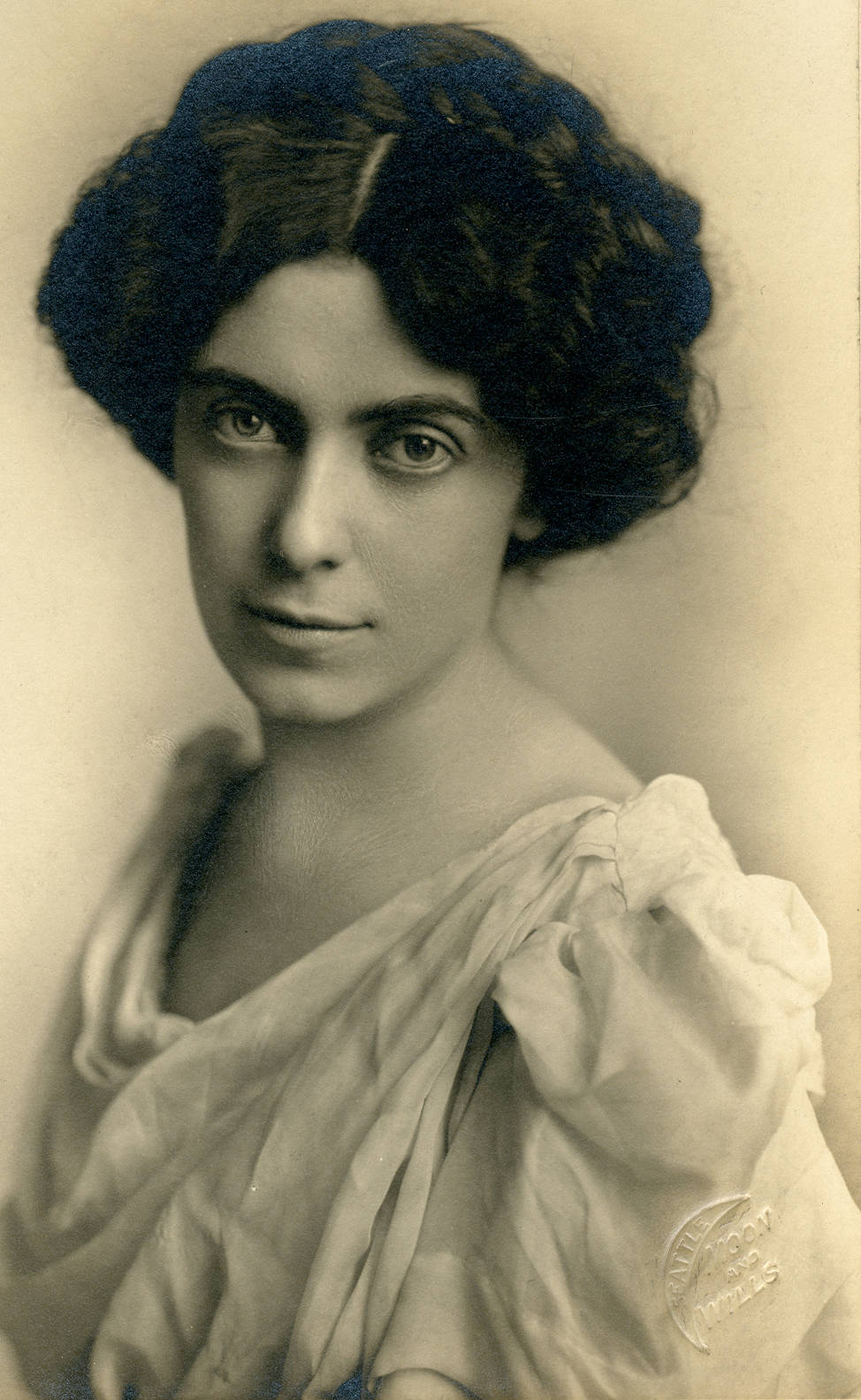
- Fowler in 1911
- Born: Eva Brenda Fowler; February 16, 1883; Jamestown, North Dakota, U.S.
- Died: October 27, 1942 (aged 59); Los Angeles, California, U.S.
- Occupations: Actress, writer
- Years active: 1905–1941
- Spouse: John W. Sherman
- Children: 1

Eva Brenda Fowler (February 16, 1883 – October 27, 1942) was an American actress and writer.

== Career ==
In 1905, Fowler was a member of the New Ulrich stock theater company. In the early 1910s, she acted for two years in Honolulu, Hawaii, with the American Stock Company. She also acted with the Morosco Stock Company in Los Angeles.

Fowler performed in vaudeville in sketches that included The Hyphen, which had a patriotic theme. On Broadway, She appeared in The Rack (1911) and Luck in Pawn (1919).

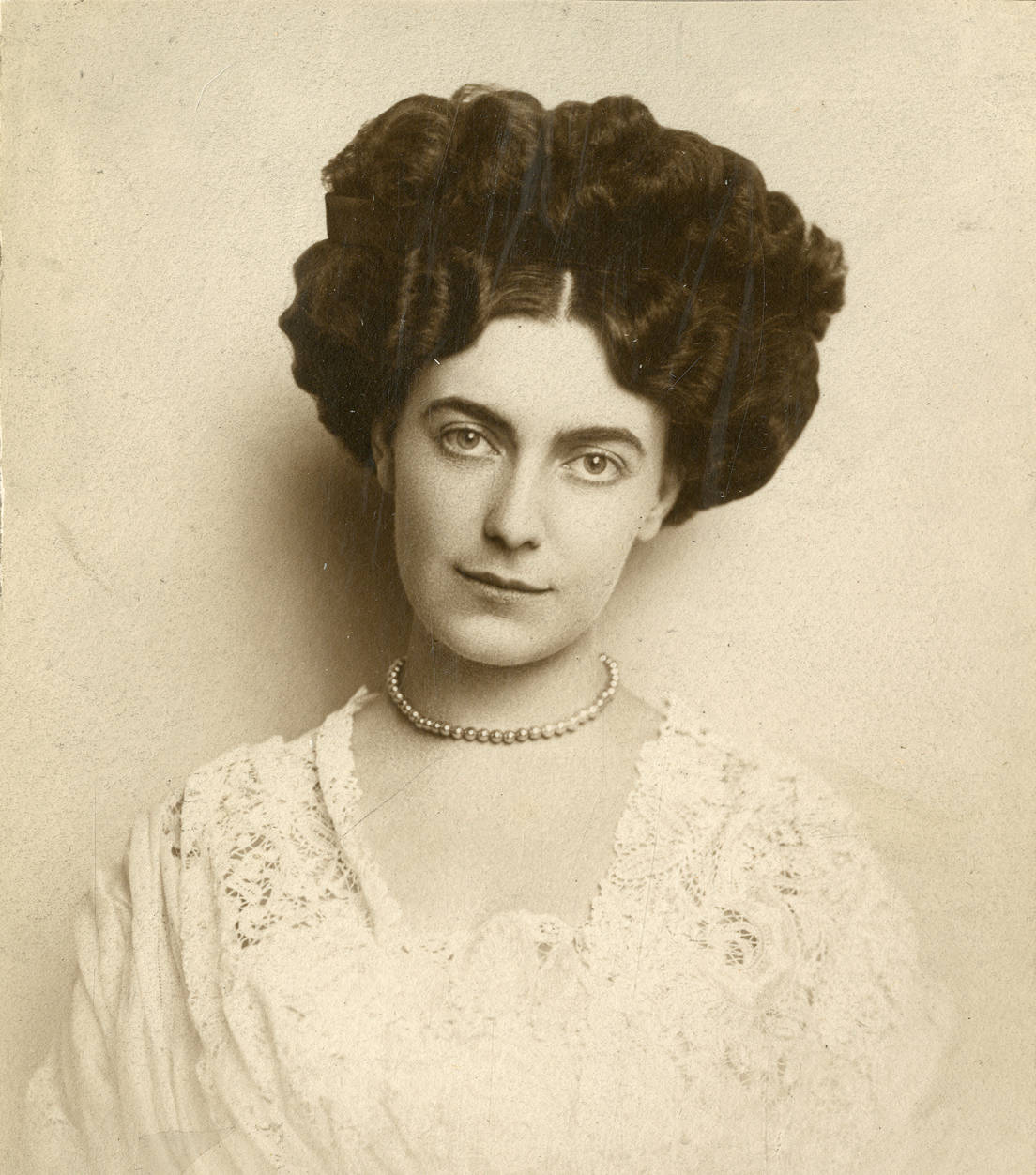
Fowler in 1910.

Fowler left the stage to act in films, beginning with Money, Money, Money, a production of Preferred Pictures in 1922. Her first talking film was The World Moves On (1934). Her later films included The Case Against Mrs. Ames, and Comin' Round the Mountain (1940). She played shrewish woman in two John Ford films: As the sister of Will Rogers in Judge Priest (1934) and as the wife of the corrupt banker (played by Berton Churchill) in Stagecoach (1939).

Fowler was also a writer, collaborating with Ethel Clifton on scripts. Twenty of their one-act plays were presented on top-level vaudeville circuits.

== Personal life ==
Fowler was married to John W. Sherman, and they had a daughter.

== Death ==
On October 27, 1942, Fowler died after a brief illness.

== Filmography ==
Year	Title	Role	Notes
1918	Thirty a Week	Mrs. Wright	
1923	Money, Money, Money	Mrs. Carter	
1934	Change of Heart	Adoption Agency's Nurse	Uncredited
1934	The World Moves On	Madame Agnes Girard (1825)	
1934	Judge Priest	Mrs. Caroline Priest	
1934	The Mighty Barnum	Mrs. Rhinelander-Fish	Uncredited
1935	Mystery Woman	Customer	Uncredited
1935	Carnival	Baby Judge	Uncredited
1935	Ruggles of Red Gap	Judy Ballard	Uncredited
1935	Bride of Frankenstein	Mother	Uncredited
1935	Ginger	Probation Officer	Uncredited
1935	Way Down East	Quilting Party Woman	
1935	Your Uncle Dudley	Committee Woman	Uncredited
1936	Riffraff	Mrs. Morgan – Prison Warden	Uncredited
1936	Lady of Secrets	Nurse	Uncredited
1936	The Story of Louis Pasteur	Midwife	Uncredited
1936	The First Baby	Friend of the Family	Uncredited
1936	The Case Against Mrs. Ames	Mrs. Shumway	
1936	Anthony Adverse	Midwife at Anthony's Birth	Uncredited
1936	Two-Fisted Gentleman	Mrs. Prentice	
1936	Second Wife	Mrs. Anderson	
1936	Can This Be Dixie?	Martin Curtis Peachtree	Uncredited
1937	Speed to Spare	Miss Granston	Uncredited
1938	Of Human Hearts	Mrs. Ames	Uncredited
1938	Young Dr. Kildare	Head Nurse	Uncredited
1938	Girls on Probation	Miss Kenney – Head Prison Matron	Uncredited
1939	Stagecoach	Mrs. Gatewood	Uncredited
1940	Castle on the Hudson	Nurse	Uncredited
1940	Women Without Names	Mrs. Turner	Uncredited
1940	Untamed	Chief Nurse	Uncredited
1940	All This, and Heaven Too	Nun	Uncredited
1940	They Drive by Night	Prison Matron	Uncredited
1940	Comin' Round the Mountain	Ma Blower	
1941	So Ends Our Night	Woman in Prague	Uncredited
1941	Manpower	Mrs. Calkin – Saleslady	Uncredited, (final film role)
