= Berton Churchill =

Canadian actor (1876–1940)

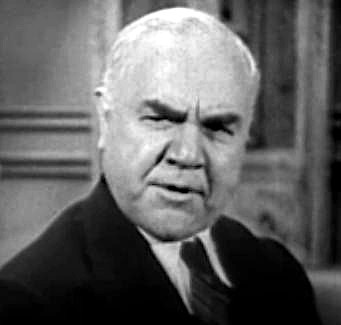
- Churchill in The Dark Hour (1936)
- Born: December 9, 1876; Toronto, Ontario, Canada
- Died: October 10, 1940 (aged 63); New York City, U.S.
- Resting place: Forest Lawn Memorial Park, Glendale, California
- Occupation: Actor
- Years active: 1919–1940
- Spouse: Harriet Gardner (m. 1907)
- Children: 1

Berton Churchill (December 9, 1876 – October 10, 1940) was a Canadian stage and film actor.

== Early years ==
Churchill was born in Toronto, Ontario. After his family moved to New York City, he graduated from high school there, studied law at night, and was a weekly participant in the William J. Florence Dramatic Society in Jersey City. As a young man interested in the theater, he appeared in stock companies as early as 1903 and worked as a newspaper pressman, eventually becoming a foreman and leader of his union. Progressing in his acting, he began performing with the Berkely Lyceum.

== Career ==
Churchill acted for two years with a traveling repertory company, developing skills that eventually took him to Broadway. The death of his father caused him to return home to work as a press foreman. Eventually he returned to acting in small parts. His career received a boost when E. F. Albee saw him perform in Boston. Albee added him to his summer stock company at Pawtucket, where Churchill continued to perform almost every summer for at least two decades.

His first performance on Broadway was in The Barber of New Orleans (1909), and his last was in Five Star Final (1930).

He was one of the earliest members of Actors Equity and sat on the union's Council. In 1919, he was in charge of the New York headquarters during the Equity strike.

Around 1929, Churchill began to perform in motion pictures. Following the use of sound in film, he moved to Hollywood, California. There, he landed numerous supporting roles, usually as the stern or pompous character with such roles as a banker, a state governor, or a land baron. He was much in demand, "establishing what was believed to be a record by appearing in 34 in 1932 alone." In more than 125 films, Churchill worked for some of the great directors such as Otto Preminger, John Ford, and Frank Capra. As well, he performed with many of the most famous stars of the day, such as Bette Davis (The Cabin in the Cotton), Jeanette MacDonald, Tyrone Power, Edward G. Robinson, and Will Rogers. Churchill is perhaps best known for his role as Gatewood, the absconding banker in John Ford's highly acclaimed 1939 film Stagecoach, starring John Wayne.

In 1925, Churchill helped found the Masquers club that led to him and five other actors creating the Screen Actors Guild in 1933.

== Death ==
Churchill died in Medical Arts Center Hospital in New York City, of uremic poisoning. His body was returned to the west coast to be interred in the Forest Lawn Memorial Park in Glendale, California.

== Selected filmography ==
Year	Title	Role	Notes
1919	The Road Called Straight	Robert Swiftmore	
1923	Six Cylinder Love	George Stapleton	
1924	Tongues of Flame	Boland	
1929	Nothing But the Truth	E.M. Burke	
1931	Tarnished Lady	Stock Speculator	Uncredited
1931	Secrets of a Secretary	Mr. Merritt	
1931	My Sin	Mr. Osgood	Uncredited
1931	Husband's Holiday	Gerald Burgess	
1931	Air Eagles	Windy J. Bailey	
1932	This Reckless Age	Banker	
1932	Taxi!	Judge West	Uncredited
1932	Impatient Maiden		
1932	Cheaters at Play		
1932	A Fool's Advice	Mayor Martin Sloan	
1932	The Wet Parade	Roger's Uncle Dick	Uncredited
1932	Scandal for Sale	Bunnyweather	
1932	It's Tough to Be Famous	Admiral Blaine	Uncredited
1932	The Mouthpiece	Judge, Rocco Trial	Uncredited
1932	Two Seconds	The Warden	
1932	The Rich Are Always with Us	Judge Bradshaw	
1932	Forgotten Commandments		Scene Deleted
1932	The Dark Horse	William A. Underwood	
1932	Week Ends Only	A.S. Carr	
1932	Fast Companions	Committee Chairman	
1932	The Washington Masquerade	Sen. Bitler	
1932	American Madness	O'Brien	Uncredited
1932	Okay, America!	Jacob Baron	
1932	The Crooked Circle	Col. Walters	
1932	The Cabin in the Cotton	Lane Norwood	
1932	The Big Stampede	Gov. Wallace	
1932	False Faces	Dr. John B. Parker	
1932	Washington Merry-Go-Round	Speaker	
1932	I Am a Fugitive from a Chain Gang	The Judge	
1932	Afraid to Talk	Mayor William 'Billy' Manning	
1932	If I Had a Million	Warden	Uncredited
1932	Madame Butterfly	American Consul	
1932	Frisco Jenny	Judge Thomas B. Reynolds	Uncredited
1933	Laughter in Hell	Mike Slaney	
1933	The Mysterious Rider	Mark King	
1933	Employees' Entrance	Mr. Bradford	Uncredited
1933	Hard to Handle	Col. H.D.X. Wells	Uncredited
1933	From Hell to Heaven	Toledo Jones	
1933	Private Jones	Roger Winthrop	
1933	The Little Giant	Donald Hadley Cass	
1933	So This Is Africa	Movie Producer	
1933	Elmer, the Great	Colonel Moffitt	
1933	Heroes for Sale	Mr. Winston	
1933	I Love That Man	Mordant	
1933	Her First Mate	Davis	
1933	The Big Brain	Col. Higginbotham	
1933	The Avenger	Forster	
1933	Doctor Bull	Herbert Banning	
1933	Golden Harvest	Eben Martin	
1933	Ladies Must Love	Gaskins	
1933	Only Yesterday	Goodheart	Uncredited
1933	College Coach	Otis	
1933	Master of Men	Mr. Walling	
1934	Frontier Marshal	Ben 'Hiram' Melton	
1934	Hi, Nellie!	Graham	
1934	Men in White	John Hudson	Uncredited
1934	Let's Be Ritzy	R.M. Pembrook	
1934	Strictly Dynamite	Mr. Rivers	
1934	Half a Sinner	Deacon Caswell	
1934	Murder in the Private Car	Luke Carson	
1934	Bachelor Bait	'Big' Barney Nolan	
1934	Friends of Mr. Sweeney	Franklyn P. Brumbaugh	
1934	Dames	Harold Ellsworthy Todd	
1934	Take the Stand	Mr. Jerome Burbank	
1934	Judge Priest	Senator Horace Maydew	
1934	Redhead	Mr. Brown	
1934	Kid Millions	Col. Harrison Larrabee	
1934	Menace	Norman Bellamy	
1934	Babbitt	Judge Virgil 'Verge' Thompson	
1934	Sing Sing Nights	Governor Duane	
1934	Bachelor of Arts	Alexander Hamilton Sr.	
1934	Life Is Worth Living		
1935	Helldorado	'Clarion' Editor	
1935	The County Chairman	Elias Rigby	
1935	A Night at the Ritz	Stephen Vincent	
1935	Vagabond Lady	R.D. Spear	
1935	$10 Raise	Mr. Bates	
1935	Dizzy Dames	Dad Hackett	
1935	Page Miss Glory	Mr. Yates	
1935	Steamboat Round the Bend	New Moses	
1935	I Live for Love	Fabian	
1935	The Spanish Cape Mystery	Judge Macklin	
1935	The Rainmakers	Simon Parker	
1935	Coronado	Walter Marvin	
1936	Black Gold	J.C. Anderson	
1936	You May Be Next	J.J. Held	
1936	The Dark Hour	Paul Bernard	
1936	Colleen	Logan	
1936	Three of a Kind	'Con' Cornelius	
1936	Parole!	Rex Gavin	
1936	Bunker Bean	Professor Ed Balthazer	
1936	Dimples	Col. Loring	
1936	Under Your Spell	Judge	
1937	Racing Lady	Judge	
1937	Parnell	The O'Gorman Mahon	
1937	Sing and Be Happy	John Mason	
1937	You Can't Beat Love	Police Chief Brennan	
1937	The Singing Marine	J. Montgomery Madison	
1937	Public Wedding	H. Theodore Lane	
1937	Wild and Woolly	Edward Ralston	
1937	Quick Money	Bluford H. Smythe	
1938	In Old Chicago	Senator Colby	
1938	He Couldn't Say No	Senator Mabby	
1938	Wide Open Faces	L.D. Crawford	
1938	Four Men and a Prayer	Mr. Martin Cherrington	
1938	Kentucky Moonshine	J.B.	
1938	Ladies in Distress	Fred Morgan	
1938	Danger on the Air	Caesar Kluck	
1938	Down in 'Arkansaw'	Judge	
1938	The Cowboy and the Lady	Henderson	
1938	Sweethearts	Sheridan	
1939	Stagecoach	Ellsworth Henry Gatewood	
1939	So This Is London	Hiram Draper	
1939	Daughters Courageous	Judge Henry Hornsby	
1939	Should Husbands Work?	Barnes	
1939	The Angels Wash Their Faces	Mayor Dooley	
1939	Hero for a Day	E.A. Dow	
1939	On Your Toes	Donald Henderson	
1940	Brother Rat and a Baby	Mr. Norman	
1940	20 Mule Team	'Jackass' Brown	
1940	Saturday's Children	Mr. Norman	
1940	Turnabout	Julian Marlowe	
1940	The Way of All Flesh	Reginald L. Morten	
1940	Cross-Country Romance	Col. Conway	
1940	Public Deb No. 1	Magistrate	
1940	I'm Nobody's Sweetheart Now	Senator Henry Lowell	

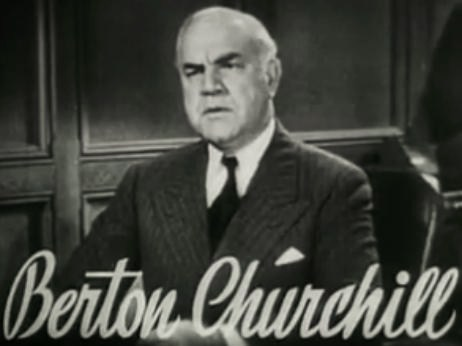
Berton Churchill in Vagabond Lady (1935)

== See also ==
- Canadian pioneers in early Hollywood
