= Friends of Mr. Sweeney =

1934 film directed by Edward Ludwig

- Directed by: Edward Ludwig
- Screenplay by: Warren B. Duff; Sid Sutherland; F. Hugh Herbert; Erwin S. Gelsey
- Based on: Friends of Mr. Sweeney; 1925 novel by Elmer Davis
- Produced by: Samuel Bischoff
- Starring: Charlie Ruggles; Ann Dvorak; Eugene Pallette; Robert Barrat; Berton Churchill; Dorothy Burgess
- Cinematography: Ira H. Morgan
- Edited by: Thomas Pratt
- Music by: Leo F. Forbstein
- Production company: Warner Bros. Pictures
- Distributed by: Warner Bros. Pictures
- Release date: July 28, 1934
- Running time: 68 minutes
- Country: United States
- Language: English

Friends of Mr. Sweeney is a 1934 American comedy film directed by Edward Ludwig and written by Warren B. Duff, Sid Sutherland, F. Hugh Herbert and Erwin S. Gelsey. It is based on the 1925 novel Friends of Mr. Sweeney by Elmer Davis. The film stars Charlie Ruggles, Ann Dvorak, Eugene Pallette, Robert Barrat, Berton Churchill and Dorothy Burgess. The film was released by Warner Bros. Pictures on July 28, 1934.

== Plot ==
Asaph Holliday has been an editor for the Balance for 20 years, obediently changing his mind any time the owner, Mr.Brumbaugh, asks him to. His young secretary, Beulah, has a crush on him, but Asaph does not realize it until he meets an old friend, Rixey, whom he hasn't seen since finishing college. Asaph rekindles the memory of his former self in college, "Ace" Holliday, and this sets him on a series of adventures. He ends up in a romance with Beulah and standing up to his boss.

== Cast ==
- Charlie Ruggles as Asaph 'Ace' Holliday
- Ann Dvorak as Miss Beulah Boyd
- Eugene Pallette as Wynn Rixey
- Robert Barrat as Alexis Romanoff
- Berton Churchill as Franklyn P. Brumbaugh
- Dorothy Burgess as Millie Seagrove
- Dorothy Tree as Countess Olga Andrei Misitalsky
- Harry Tyler as Mike
- Harry Beresford as Claude
- William B. Davidson as Stephen Prime
