= David Landau (actor) =

American actor (1879–1935)

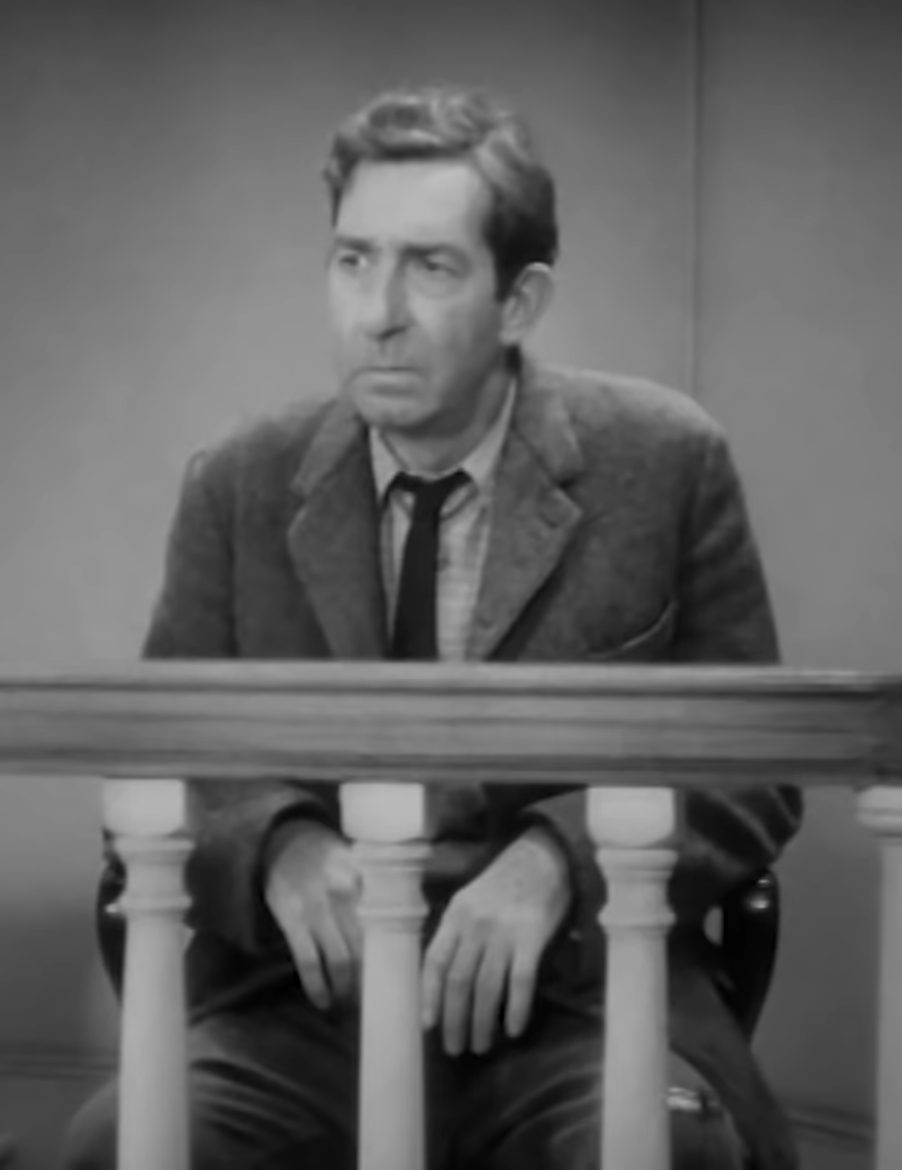
- Landau in Judge Priest (1934)
- Born: David H. Magee; March 9, 1879; Philadelphia, Pennsylvania, U.S.
- Died: September 20, 1935 (aged 56); Hollywood, California, U.S.
- Resting place: Forest Lawn Memorial Park, Glendale, California
- Occupation: Actor
- Years active: 1919–1935
- Spouse: Sarah Frances Newhall (m. 1903)
- Partner: Delight Howell

David Landau (born David Magee; March 9, 1879 – September 20, 1935) was an American stage and film actor who appeared in 33 films from 1931 to 1935. He appeared on Broadway in 12 plays from 1919 to 1929.

== Early life and start of film career ==
Landau was born in Philadelphia, the son of Robert Magee, who emigrated from County Londonderry, Ireland and listed his occupation as a gardener on the 1880 census. His mother, Maryann, was Pennsylvania-born of Irish and English descent. Landau studied law at the University of Pennsylvania. To improve his diction, he took a class in dramatics and later abandoned his law studies. He performed on Broadway and in many other stage productions, including beginning at the Burbank and Belasco theatres in Los Angeles in 1931. For at least three years, he performed in Street Scene, beginning in New York and then in other cities, including London. He made his film debut in 1931.

== Personal life and death ==
Landau's first wife was legally concluded by a court to have been actress Frances Landau (born Sarah Frances Newhall), whom he married on April 14, 1903, in Mount Carmel, Pennsylvania. In his will, he questioned whether Frances had obtained a legal divorce from her previous husband, Edwin T. Emory, in 1900, before she had married him in 1903. Landau directed in his will that if Frances could prove her legal divorce from her previous husband, she should receive "the smallest legal amount" possible. His will left his estate ($3,803) to Delight Howell, "the best friend I ever had … in payment for her loyalty in spite of adversity". According to the 1930 U.S. census, he was living with her in New York at that time. Howell is listed as "Lodger". Frances Landau claimed that Howell had taken advantage of her husband to make him believe that he and Frances had never been legally married. His funeral announcement in the Los Angeles Times referred to him as "[the] beloved husband of Delight Landau"; his obituary in The New York Times cited "Mrs. Delight Landau, his widow, survives".

In 1934, Landau suffered a stroke from which he never recovered. He died of a heart attack at his home on September 20, 1935. He is buried at Forest Lawn Memorial Park in Glendale, California.

== Partial filmography ==
- Bondwomen (1915) - David Power
- I Take This Woman (1931) - Circus Boss
- Street Scene (1931) - Mr. Frank Maurrant
- Arrowsmith (1931) - State Veterinarian
- This Reckless Age (1932) - Matthew Daggett
- Union Depot (1932) - Kendall
- Taxi! (1932) - Buck Gerard
- Polly of the Circus (1932) - Beef
- It's Tough to Be Famous (1932) - Chief Petty Officer Steve Stevens
- Amateur Daddy (1932) - Sam Pelgram
- The Roadhouse Murder (1932) - Kraft
- The Purchase Price (1932) - Bull McDowell
- Horse Feathers (1932) - Jennings
- 70,000 Witnesses (1932) - Dan McKenna
- The Cabin in the Cotton (1932) - Tom Blake
- Heritage of the Desert (1932) - Judson Holderness
- False Faces (1932) - McCullough
- Air Mail (1932) - 'Pop'
- I Am a Fugitive from a Chain Gang (1932) - The Warden
- Under-Cover Man (1932) - Inspector Conklin
- They Just Had to Get Married (1932) - Montrose
- Lawyer Man (1932) - John Gilmurry
- She Done Him Wrong (1933) - Dan Flynn
- The Crime of the Century (1933) - Police Lt. Frank Martin
- Gabriel Over the White House (1933) - John Bronson
- The Nuisance (1933) - Kelley
- No Marriage Ties (1933) - Mr. Zimmer, Editor of 'The Reflector'
- One Man's Journey (1933) - McGinnis
- Bedside (1934) - Smith
- As the Earth Turns (1934) - Mark Shaw
- Wharf Angel (1934) - Moore
- The Man With Two Faces (1934) - Curtis
- Death on the Diamond (1934) - 'Pop' Clark
- Judge Priest (1934) - Bob Gillis (final film role)
