= Dorothy Burgess =

American actress (1907–1961)

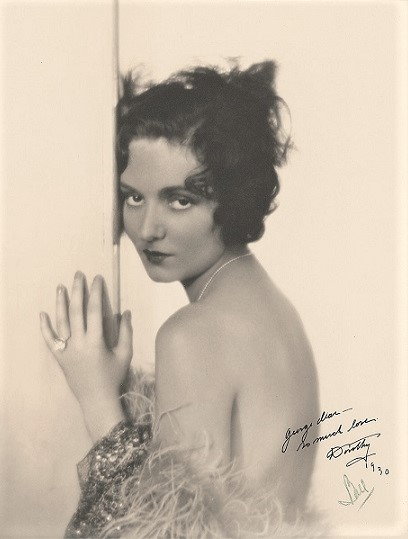
- Burgess in 1930
- Born: March 4, 1905; Los Angeles, U.S.
- Died: August 20, 1961 (aged 54); Woodland Hills, California, U.S.
- Resting place: Chapel of the Pines Crematory, Los Angeles, California
- Occupation: Actress
- Years active: 1926–1943

Dorothy Burgess (March 4, 1905 – August 20, 1961) was an American stage and motion-picture actress.

== Family, education ==
Born in Los Angeles in 1907, Burgess was a niece of Fay Bainter. On her father's side, she was related to David C. Montgomery of Montgomery and Stone. Her grandfather was Henry A. Burgess Sr. He came to Los Angeles in 1893, establishing a business at Terminal Island. His home was at 637 West 41st Place. He was born in England. Her dad was H.A. (Burgie) Burgess, a pioneer air-transport executive. For a decade, he was an assistant to Harris M. (Pop) Hanshue, who founded Western Air Express (Western Airlines), and was its first president. Burgess studied drawing, painting, and sculpture at Mrs. Dow's School in Briarcliff Manor, New York. Her talent in the three artistic disciplines was evident in the creative objects that decorated her Hollywood apartment. Burgess and her mother, Grace, resided in a home in Malibu, California, in 1932.

== Stage actress ==
Burgess made her stage debut in a walk-on role in support of her mother's sister, Bainter. She first came to light as a specialty dancer in The Music Box Revue. In September 1924, Burgess joined the cast of the Broadway hit Dancing Mothers, in which her mother Grace had a featured role, where she had a bit in a cabaret scene and also understudied Helen Hayes in one of the principal roles. Burgess was promoted from understudy to a leading part in November 1924 when Hayes left for Quarantine. Burgess played a 17-year-old in the comedy, The Adorable Liar, which was staged at the 49th Street Theater in August 1926.

Dorothy Burgess

Her knowledge of the stage was proficient and she combined this with ample charm and attractiveness. Burgess was co-featured in a stock company managed by George Cukor and George H. Kondolf at the Lyceum Theatre in Rochester, New York, during the summer of 1928. Her co-star was Henry Hull. The actors opened on Broadway on April 30. She learned about being a character actor in stock, along with adapting her voice and mannerisms to each new role.

Burgess was on Broadway in The Squall and played the title role in Lulu Belle;. she was given star billing by David Belasco. The play was performed at the Belasco Theater in Los Angeles in October 1929. Burgess depicted a Mexican girl in The Broken Wing, a Paul Dickerson romantic comedy, staged at El Capitan Theater in Los Angeles, in July 1931. She was typecast as a Spanish woman so much that one reviewer commented that perhaps a Spanish onion or a Mexican chili pepper was in her family tree, but offstage, she was much more a typical American co-ed than the Carmenesque young ladies she often played. She made Hollywood her permanent home, living at 210 South Fuller Avenue.

== Movie career ==
Fox Film acquired her services and she debuted in In Old Arizona (1928), the first of the outdoor talking films. Burgess portrayed the Mexican minx, who was desired by both Edmund Lowe and Warner Baxter. A reviewer noted that her voice was good. The first film made with the Movietone sound system, it was a romance of the old Southwest.

In May 1929, two large lamps mounted on a tripod toppled over on a sound stage where Burgess was working at the Fox Movietone Studio. She was cut severely over her left eye by one of the incandescent lamps. Burgess was rushed to a studio hospital, where several stitches were taken in her wound.

Burgess won the feminine lead in Beyond Victory (1931) after Ann Harding decided not to make the movie. The Pathé Pictures release featured William Boyd as the leading man. In December 1931 Burgess signed with First National Pictures for a significant role in Play Girl (1932), which had a screen story by Maude Fulton. The movie was produced by Warner Bros. and First National.

Burgess had a featured role as a romantic rival of Jean Harlow in Hold Your Man (1932), also starring Clark Gable. Burgess also appeared in Swing High (1930), Taxi! (1932), Ladies They Talk About (1933), Strictly Personal (1933), Headline Shooter (1933), Night Flight (1933), Black Moon (1934), and Miss Fane's Baby Is Stolen (1934). Burgess acted with Lowe and Nancy Carroll in the Paramount Pictures release, I Love That Man (1933), directed by Harry Joe Brown and produced by Charles R. Rogers. Burgess strained ligaments in her back and shoulders during filming at Universal Pictures studio in July 1933. She was performing fight scenes with Mary Carlisle and Sally O'Neil.

Burgess appeared with Richard Barthelmess and Jean Muir in A Modern Hero (1934), which deals with a young circus rider. Gambling (1934) starred George M. Cohan, and was produced by Harold B. Franklin at the Eastern Services Studios in Astoria, Queens. Burgess played the part of Dorothy Kane. Her role as Trixie in The Lone Star Ranger (1942) represented a return to playing a dance-hall girl, as she did in In Old Arizona. The film was produced by 20th Century-Fox.

== Private life ==
Burgess became engaged to movie director Clarence Brown in 1932. She was involved in a romance with wealthy New York jeweler Jules Galenzer in 1934.

== Manslaughter charge ==
Burgess was charged with manslaughter following an auto accident in which she was driving; 17-year-old Louise Manfredi died in the wreck, in San Francisco, on the night of December 23, 1932. Burgess, driving alone, collided with a car driven by 18-year-old Andrew Salz, a student at the University of California-Berkeley. Burgess's hearing was postponed and her bail was fixed at $50. She suffered from shock and was placed in a San Francisco sanitarium. Salz and Burgess each accused the other of responsibility for the accident.

Burgess was sued by Louise Manfredi's parents, Italo and Marie Manfredi, in January 1933. They sought $25,000 in damages. A compromise payment of $6,150 was approved by the San Francisco Superior Court in August 1933. Earlier, a compromise amounting to $6,000 was agreed upon for damages claimed by 18-year-old swimmer Betty Lou Davis, who was injured in the same accident.

== Death ==
Dorothy Burgess was living in Palm Springs, California in May 1961 when she was hospitalized. On August 20, 1961, she died of lung cancer at the Motion Picture Country Home in Woodland Hills, Los Angeles, California. She was 54. Her remains are in vaultage at Chapel of the Pines Crematory in Los Angeles.

== Partial filmography ==
- In Old Arizona (1928) as Tonia Maria
- Protection (1929) as Myrtle Hines
- Pleasure Crazed (1929) as Alma Dean
- A Song of Kentucky (1929) as Nancy Morgan
- Swing High (1930) as Trixie
- Recaptured Love (1930) as Peggy Price
- Oh! Oh! Cleopatra (1931, Short) as Cleopatra
- Lasca of the Rio Grande (1931) as Lasca
- Taxi! (1932) as Marie Costa
- Play Girl (1932) as Edna
- The Stoker (1932) as Margarita Valdez
- Out of Singapore aka Gangsters on the Sea (1932) as Concha Renaldo
- Malay Nights (1932) as Eve Blake
- On Your Guard (1933) as 'Sissy' Shannon
- Ladies They Talk About (1933) as 'Sister' Susie
- What Price Decency (1933) as Norma
- Strictly Personal (1933) as Bessie
- Rusty Rides Alone (1933) as Mona Quillan
- Hold Your Man (1933) as Gypsy Angecon
- Easy Millions (1933)
- It's Great to Be Alive (1933) as Al Moran
- I Love That Man (1933) as Ethel or Giggles
- The Important Witness (1933) as Ruth Dana
- Headline Shooter (1933) as Ruby - Burnett's moll
- Ladies Must Love (1933) as Peggy Burns
- Night Flight or Dawn To Dark (1933) as Pellerin's Girlfriend
- From Headquarters (1933) as Dolly White
- Miss Fane's Baby Is Stolen (1934) as Dotty
- Orient Express (1934) as Mable Express
- Fashions of 1934 (1934) as Glenda
- A Modern Hero (1934) as Hazel Flint Radier
- Affairs of a Gentleman (1934) as Nan Fitzgerald
- Black Moon (1934) as Juanita Perez Lane
- The Circus Clown (1934) as Babe
- Hat, Coat, and Glove (1934) as Ann Brewster
- Friends of Mr. Sweeney (1934) as Millie Seagrove
- Gambling (1934) as Dorothy Kane
- Village Tale (1935) as Lulu Stevenson
- Manhattan Butterfly (1935) as Another Singer
- The Lady in Question (1940) as Antoinette (uncredited)
- I Want a Divorce (1940) as 'Peppy' Gilman
- Cadet Girl (1941) as Minor Role (uncredited)
- Lady for a Night (1942) as Flo
- Lone Star Ranger (1942) as Trixie
- Man of Courage (1943) as Sally Dickson
- Girls in Chains (1943) as Mrs. Peters
- The West Side Kid (1943) as Toodles (final film role)
