= A Modern Hero =

1934 American film by G.W. Pabst

- Film poster
- Directed by: G. W. Pabst
- Written by: Louis Bromfield; Gene Markey; Kathryn Scola
- Starring: Richard Barthelmess
- Cinematography: William Rees
- Edited by: James Gibbon
- Distributed by: Warner Bros. Pictures
- Release date: April 21, 1934
- Running time: 71 minutes
- Country: United States
- Language: English

A Modern Hero is a 1934 American pre-Code romance drama film starring Richard Barthelmess and directed by G. W. Pabst. It is based on the novel with the same title by Louis Bromfield. It was Pabst's only American talking film and the next-to-last film that Barthelmess made under contract to Warner Bros. Pictures.

== Plot ==
When a circus comes to Pentland, Illinois, young Joanna Ryan is seduced by trick rider Pierre Radier. Despite his physical skill, Pierre is dissatisfied with circus life and falls in love with Joanna. His mother, the one-armed circus star Madame Azais, warns Pierre about falling in love. She tells how she lost her arm to a leopard because she was distracted by her love for Pierre's father, one of the richest men in Europe. She urges Pierre instead to act on his ambitions and desire for wealth. Joanna's drunken father confronts Pierre with news of Joanna's pregnancy, then died in an accident, Pierre offers to marry Joanna, but she wants the familiar stability of small-town life and marries local Elmer Croy. Croy knows about her pregnancy. Pierre gives her money for the child's support.

Joanna's Aunt Clara arranges for Pierre to see his newborn son and introduces him to her friend, wealthy widow Leah Ernst. Planning to open a bicycle shop with his friend Henry Mueller, Pierre borrows money from Leah and becomes her lover. The shop is a success, and Pierre and Henry move into the emerging automobile business, finding an eager backer in Homer Flint, the richest man in the state. Meanwhile, afraid of losing Pierre, Leah seeks advice from Madame Azais, now a fortune-teller, unaware that she is Pierre's mother. Madame Azais warns Leah that she will not be able to hold Pierre, because no woman ever means as much to him as he does to himself.

In his quest for financial and social success, Pierre Americanizes his name to "Paul Rader" and becomes Flint's partner, driving Henry to go his own way. On the way to the country club, Paul proposes to Flint's daughter, Hazel, more to further his own ambitions than for love. At the club, a young boy offers to caddy for him, and Paul discovers that the boy is his son, Pierre Croy.

Now married but childless, Paul offers to adopt Pierre. Joanna flatly refuses, but she allows Paul to finance Pierre's education at an elite boarding school when Pierre is older. She worries that Paul may spoil his son, who is still unaware of his parentage.

In 1922, Paul escorts Pierre to school and stops in New York City, where he begins an affair with yet another wealthy woman, Lady Claire Benston. Yearning for complete financial independence from Flint, Paul entrusts his entire fortune to a stock speculator. Pierre, now a young man, spends Christmas in New York with Paul and comes home drunk after a night on the town. Warning Pierre about the dangers of drinking “when it is in your blood”, Paul reveals that he is his father. The two look forward to a future in business together. Meanwhile, a distraught Hazel finds Paul's will leaving everything to his son.

It all comes crashing down. The stock speculator, a swindler, vanishes. Lady Benston wants nothing further to do with Paul, calling him a peasant. Pierre is killed driving a new car given him by his father. When he brings Pierre's body to the grieving family, Joanna refuses to shake his hand. Paul leaves Hazel, who cries that she's glad Pierre is dead. Ruined and heartsick, Paul seeks out his mother. Though she is old and living in near-poverty, she tells him that he is free of his father's blood; he has finally learned what is real. They can make a fresh start in Europe. Paul kneels, saying, "Maybe some day, I'll be worthy of you."

== Cast ==
- Richard Barthelmess as Pierre Radier, aka Paul Rader
- Jean Muir as Joanna Ryan Croy
- Marjorie Rambeau as Madame Azais
- Verree Teasdale as Lady Claire Benston
- Florence Eldridge as Leah Ernst
- Dorothy Burgess as Hazel Flint Radier
- Hobart Cavanaugh as Henry Mueller
- William Janney as Young Pierre Croy
- Arthur Hohl as Homer Flint
- Theodore Newton as Elmer Croy
- J. M. Kerrigan as Mr. Ryan
- Maidel Turner as Aunt Clara Weingartner
- Mickey Rentschler as Young Pierre as a Child
- Richard Tucker as Mr. Eggelson
- Judith Vosselli as Mrs. Eggelson
- Theresa Harris as Leah's maid
