= False Faces (1932 film) =

1932 film

- Directed by: Lowell Sherman
- Written by: Llewellyn Hughes; Kubec Glasmon
- Produced by: Lowell Sherman
- Starring: Lowell Sherman; Peggy Shannon; Lila Lee; Berton Churchill
- Cinematography: Ray Binger; Ted D. McCord
- Edited by: Rose Loewinger
- Music by: Val Burton
- Production company: K.B.S. Productions
- Distributed by: World Wide Pictures
- Release date: October 13, 1932
- Running time: 73 minutes
- Country: United States
- Language: English

False Faces is a 1932 American drama film directed by Lowell Sherman and starring Sherman, Peggy Shannon, Lila Lee and Berton Churchill. It was shot at the Los Angeles studios of Tiffany Pictures and distributed by the independent World Wide Pictures.

== Overview ==
This thinly veiled biopic of the notorious Henry Schireson, the "King of the Quack Doctors", offers a searing portrait of greed, manipulation and unchecked ego. Before becoming a top director, Lowell Sherman was known for playing scoundrels, and he delivers a chilling performance as Dr. Silas Brenton, a charismatic sociopath who seduces women into undergoing cosmetic surgery, despite having no real surgical skill—and no remorse for the consequences. Instead he lives lavishly off his victims, until the lies and bodies pile up.

== Plot Summary ==
Dr. Silas Brenton, a disgraced Doctor, travels to New York and opens his own practice, maneuvering public spectacle to grow his fame and notoriety. As time progresses, he grows increasingly reckless in his procedures, leading eventually to the death of a woman in surgery, a crime he is put on trial for.

== Cast ==
- Lowell Sherman as Dr. Silas Brenton
- Peggy Shannon as Elsie Fryer
- Lila Lee as Georgia Rand
- Berton Churchill as Dr. John B. Parker
- David Landau as McCullough
- Harold Waldridge as Jimmy
- Geneva Mitchell as Florence Day
- Oscar Apfel as Fineberg
- Miriam Seegar as Lottie Nation
- Joyce Compton as Dottie Nation
- Nance O'Neil as Mrs. Finn
- Edward Martindel as Jonathan Day
- Purnell Pratt as Jefferson Howe
- Olive Tell as Mrs. Day
- John St. Polis as Dr. McDonald
- Francis Sayles as Officer Pjolowich
- Helene Millard as June Deering
- Lee Kohlmar as Earl Wyman
- Arthur Housman as Harold
- Clay Clement as Dr. Kelly
- Eddie 'Rochester' Anderson as Chauffeur
- Frank Atkinson as Butler
- Forrest Stanley as District Attorney
- Gene Morgan as Master of Ceremonies
- Hooper Atchley as Radio Executive
- Dorothy Vernon as Patient
- Ken Maynard as Himself in nightclub

== Bibliography ==
- Pitts, Michael R. Poverty Row Studios, 1929–1940: An Illustrated History of 55 Independent Film Companies, with a Filmography for Each. McFarland & Company, 2005.
