= Down to Earth (1932 film) =

1932 film

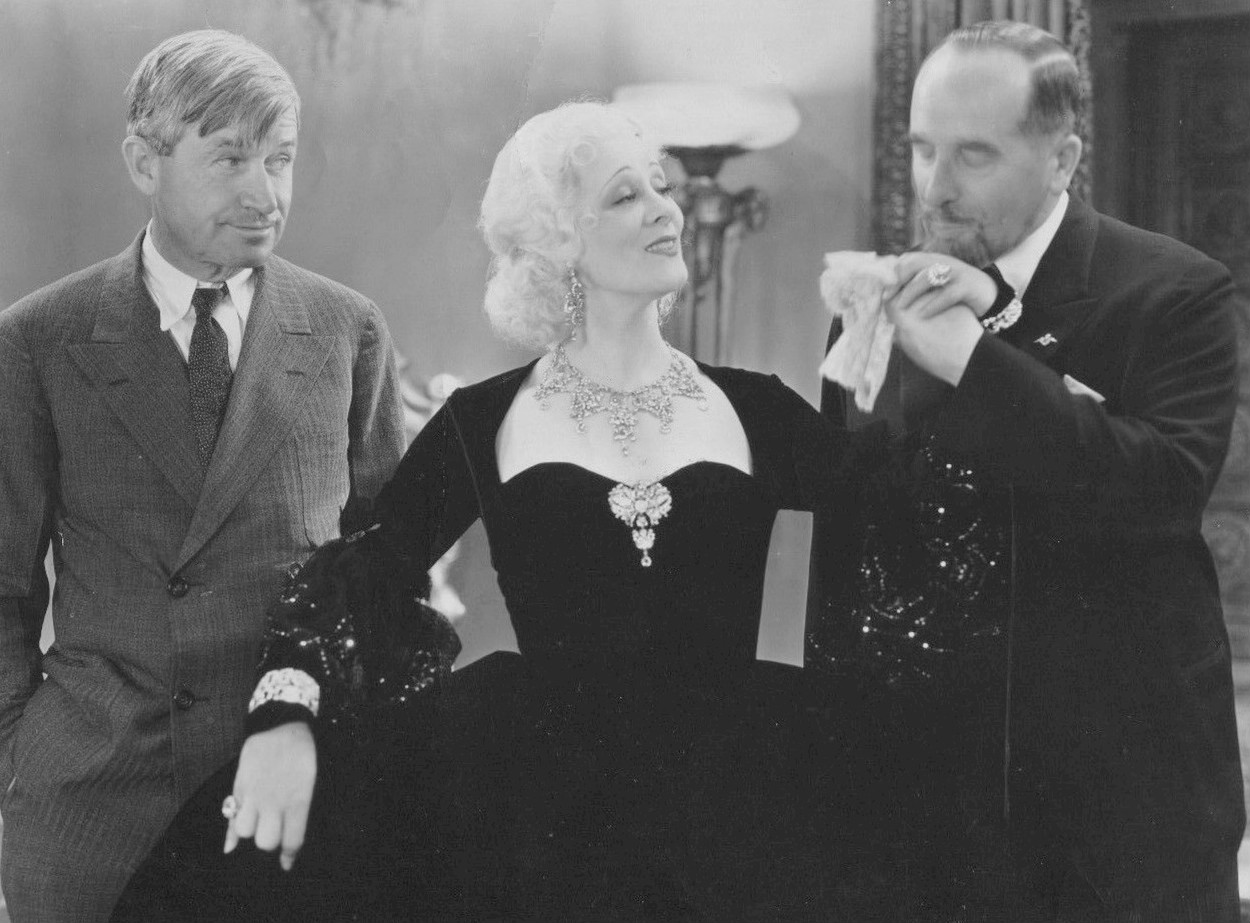
- Directed by: David Butler
- Written by: Edwin J. Burke; Homer Croy
- Starring: Will Rogers; Dorothy Jordan; Irene Rich
- Cinematography: Ernest Palmer
- Edited by: Irene Morra
- Music by: George Lipschultz
- Production company: Fox Film Corporation
- Distributed by: Fox Film Corporation
- Release date: September 1, 1932
- Running time: 79 minutes
- Country: United States
- Language: English

Down to Earth is a 1932 American pre-Code comedy film directed by David Butler and starring Will Rogers, Dorothy Jordan and Irene Rich. It is a sequel to the 1929 film They Had to See Paris, with the Peters family returning to America where their wealthy lifestyle is suddenly hit by the Great Depression.

== Main cast ==
- Will Rogers as Pike Peters
- Dorothy Jordan as Julia Pearson
- Irene Rich as Idy Peters
- Matty Kemp as Ross Peters
- Mary Carlisle as Jackie Harper
- Brandon Hurst as Jeffrey, the Butler
- Theodore Lodi as Grand Duke Michael
- Clarence Wilson as Ed Eggers

== Bibliography ==
- Bryan B. Sterling. Will Rogers in Hollywood. Crown Publishers, 1984.
