= 70,000 Witnesses =

1932 film

- Theatrical release poster
- Directed by: Ralph Murphy
- Screenplay by: Garrett Fort; Robert N. Lee; Allen Rivkin; P.J. Wolfson
- Produced by: Charles R. Rogers
- Starring: Phillips Holmes; Dorothy Jordan; Charlie Ruggles; Johnny Mack Brown; J. Farrell MacDonald; Lew Cody; David Landau
- Cinematography: Henry Sharp
- Music by: Harold Lewis
- Production company: Paramount Pictures
- Distributed by: Paramount Pictures
- Release date: September 9, 1932
- Running time: 69 minutes
- Country: United States
- Language: English

70,000 Witnesses is a 1932 American sports mystery film directed by Ralph Murphy, written by Garrett Fort, Robert N. Lee, Allen Rivkin and P.J. Wolfson, and starring Phillips Holmes, Dorothy Jordan, Charlie Ruggles, Johnny Mack Brown, J. Farrell MacDonald, Lew Cody and David Landau. It was released on September 9, 1932, by Paramount Pictures. The film's sets were designed by the art director David S. Garber.

In the film, a star player of college football collapses during a game. He dies shortly after, and his death is initially ruled accidental. But a police detective wants to re-enact the football game, in an attempt to find who killed the player.

== Plot ==
Buck Buchanan plays football for State, but his criminal brother Slip Buchanan has placed a whopping $350,000 wager on University defeating State in the upcoming big game.

Slip attempts to coerce his brother into drugging a star teammate, Wally Clark, so he is unable to play. Buck refuses to do so, but is distracted on the field of play by his suspicions that Slip will find another way to do Wally harm.

Sure enough, just as Wally is about to score a State touchdown, he collapses at the 5 yard line. As 70,000 spectators look on, Wally is carried from the field and expires. A doctor rules the death accidental, but a police detective, Dan McKenna, is so convinced of foul play, he has the players reassembled and the entire football play re-enacted, solving the case.

== Cast ==
- Phillips Holmes as Buck Buchanan
- Dorothy Jordan as Dorothy Clark
- Charlie Ruggles as Johnny Moran
- Johnny Mack Brown as Wally Clark
- J. Farrell MacDonald as State Coach
- Lew Cody as "Slip" Buchanan
- David Landau as Dan McKenna
- Kenneth Thomson as Dr. Collins
- Guinn "Big Boy" Williams as Connors

== See also ==
- List of American football films
