= Comin' Round the Mountain (1940 film) =

1940 film by George Archainbaud

- Theatrical release poster
- Directed by: George Archainbaud
- Screenplay by: Lewis R. Foster; Maxwell Shane; Duke Atteberry
- Produced by: William C. Thomas
- Starring: Bob Burns; Una Merkel; Jerry Colonna; Don Wilson; Pat Barrett; Harold Peary; Bill Thompson
- Cinematography: William C. Mellor
- Edited by: Stuart Gilmore
- Production company: Paramount Pictures
- Distributed by: Paramount Pictures
- Release date: August 16, 1940
- Running time: 63 minutes
- Country: United States
- Language: English

Comin' Round the Mountain is a 1940 American comedy film directed by George Archainbaud and written by Lewis R. Foster, Maxwell Shane and Duke Atteberry. The film stars Bob Burns, Una Merkel, Jerry Colonna, Don Wilson, Pat Barrett, Harold Peary and Bill Thompson. The film was released on August 16, 1940, by Paramount Pictures.

== Plot ==
After briefly moving to the big city, Jed Blower, a musician, moves back to his hometown in rural Tennessee and becomes mayor. He then tries to convince his family to go to the city and play their music on the radio.

== Cast ==
- Bob Burns as Jed Blower
- Una Merkel as Belinda Watters
- Jerry Colonna as Argyle Phifft
- Don Wilson as Fictional Radio Program Announcer
- Pat Barrett as Uncle Ezra Watters
- Harold Peary as Mayor Gildersleeve
- Bill Thompson as Barney Smoot
- Richard Carle as Lester Smoot
- Marjorie Bauersfeld as Ma Beagle
- William Demarest as Gutsy Mann
- Cliff Arquette as Droopy Beagle
- Luke Cosgrave as Uncle Ditto
- Leona Roberts as Aunt Polly Watters
- Zeffie Tilbury as Granny Stokes
- Donald Hall as Hillbilly Boy
- Brenda Fowler as Ma Blower
- Olin Howland as Pa Blower
- Walter Catlett as W.P.A. Clerk
