= I Love That Man =

1933 film

- Theatrical release poster
- Directed by: Harry Joe Brown
- Screenplay by: C. Graham Baker; Casey Robinson; Gene Towne
- Produced by: Charles R. Rogers
- Starring: Edmund Lowe; Nancy Carroll; Robert Armstrong; Lew Cody; Warren Hymer; Grant Mitchell; Dorothy Burgess
- Cinematography: Milton R. Krasner
- Edited by: Joseph Kane
- Music by: Karl Hajos; Bernhard Kaun; Rudolph G. Kopp; John Leipold; Harold Lewis
- Production company: Paramount Pictures
- Distributed by: Paramount Pictures
- Release date: June 9, 1933
- Country: United States
- Language: English

I Love That Man is a 1933 American pre-Code drama film directed by Harry Joe Brown and written by C. Graham Baker, Casey Robinson and Gene Towne. The film stars Edmund Lowe, Nancy Carroll, Robert Armstrong, Lew Cody, Warren Hymer, Grant Mitchell and Dorothy Burgess. The film was released on July 8, 1933, by Paramount Pictures.

The film's sets were designed by the art director David S. Garber.

== Cast ==
- Edmund Lowe as Brains Stanley / Roger Winthrop
- Nancy Carroll as Grace Clark
- Robert Armstrong as Driller
- Lew Cody as Labels Castell
- Warren Hymer as Mousey
- Grant Mitchell as Dr. Crittenden
- Dorothy Burgess as Ethel
- Walter Walker as Mr. Walker
- Berton Churchill as Mordant
- Susan Fleming as Miss Jones
- Luis Alberni as Angelo
- Lee Kohlmar as Old Man Cohen
- Harvey Clark as Fred J. Harper
- Belle Mitchell as Maria
- Leon Holmes as Abe
- Esther Muir as Babe
- Patrick H. O'Malley, Jr. as Prison Interne
- Lloyd Ingraham as Ace
