= No Marriage Ties =

1933 film by J. Walter Ruben

- Lobby card
- Directed by: J. Walter Ruben; James Anderson (assistant)
- Screenplay by: Arthur Caesar; H.W. Hanemann; Sam Mintz
- Based on: Ad Man; 1932 play by Charles W. Curran; Arch Gaffney
- Produced by: Merian C. Cooper
- Starring: Richard Dix; Elizabeth Allan; Doris Kenyon; Alan Dinehart; David Landau
- Cinematography: Henry Cronjager
- Edited by: George Hively
- Music by: Max Steiner
- Production company: RKO Pictures
- Distributed by: RKO Pictures
- Release date: August 8, 1933
- Running time: 72 minutes
- Country: United States
- Language: English

No Marriage Ties is a 1933 American pre-Code drama film directed by J. Walter Ruben and written by Arthur Caesar, H.W. Hanemann, Sam Mintz. The film stars Richard Dix, Elizabeth Allan, Doris Kenyon, Alan Dinehart and David Landau. The film was released on August 8, 1933, by RKO Pictures.

== Plot ==
A heavy-drinking journalist joins forces with a public relations man to form a successful advertising agency. Although the business becomes a success, it takes a toll on the ex-reporter's personal life.

== Cast ==
- Richard Dix as Bruce Foster
- Elizabeth Allan as Peggy Wilson
- Doris Kenyon as Adrienne Deane
- Alan Dinehart as 'Perk' Perkins
- David Landau as Mr. Zimmer, Editor of 'The Reflector'
- Hobart Cavanaugh as Smith
- Hilda Vaughn as Fanny Olmstead, Foster's Secretary
- Charles C. Wilson as Red Moran, City Desk Editor
