= The Case Against Mrs. Ames =

1936 film by William A. Seiter

- theatrical release poster
- Directed by: William A. Seiter
- Written by: C. Graham Baker; Gene Towne
- Based on: The Case Against Mrs. Ames by Arthur Somers Roche
- Produced by: Walter Wanger
- Starring: Madeleine Carroll; George Brent; Arthur Treacher
- Cinematography: Lucien N. Andriot
- Edited by: Dorothy Spencer
- Music by: Gerard Carbonara
- Production company: Walter Wanger Productions
- Distributed by: Paramount Pictures
- Release date: May 8, 1936
- Running time: 85 minutes
- Country: United States
- Language: English
- Budget: $334,971
- Box office: $339,443

The Case Against Mrs. Ames is a 1936 American mystery drama film written by C. Graham Baker and Gene Towne based on a serial of the same name by Arthur Somers Roche originally published in Collier's Weekly magazine in 1934, and then as a novel in 1936. The film was directed by William A. Seiter and stars Madeleine Carroll and George Brent, and features Arthur Treacher, Alan Baxter, Beulah Bondi and Alan Mowbray. Paramount had originally intended to cast Gary Cooper and Carole Lombard in the lead roles.

== Plot ==
San Francisco socialite Hope Ames is accused of murdering her husband. She is prosecuted by District Attorney Matt Logan but is acquitted at her trial. However her mother-in-law now tries to gain custody of the couple's son.

== Cast ==
- Madeleine Carroll as Hope Ames
- George Brent as Matt Logan
- Arthur Treacher as Griggsby
- Alan Baxter as Lou
- Beulah Bondi as Mrs. Livingston Ames
- Alan Mowbray as Lawrence Waterson
- Brenda Fowler as Mrs. Shumway
- Esther Dale as Matilda
- Edward Brophy as Sid
- Richard Carle as Uncle Gordon
- Scotty Beckett as Bobbie Ames
- Mayo Methot as Cora
- Guy Bates Post as Judge John Davis
- June Brewster as Laurette La Rue
- Elvira Curci as Jeanette
- Jonathan Hale as Judge at First Trial

Cast notes

- The Case Against Mrs. Ames was Madeleine Carroll's American film debut.

== Reception ==
The Case Against Mrs. Ames recorded a loss of $38,869.

== Bibliography ==
- Pascoe, John. Madeleine Carroll: Actress and Humanitarian, from The 39 Steps to the Red Cross. McFarland, 2020.
