= The Roadhouse Murder =

1932 film

- Theatrical release poster
- Directed by: J. Walter Ruben; James Anderson (assistant)
- Screenplay by: J. Walter Ruben; Gene Fowler
- Based on: L'Épouvante (novel) by Maurice Level play by Leslie Bush-Fekete (uncredited)
- Produced by: Willis Goldbeck
- Starring: Dorothy Jordan; Eric Linden; Purnell Pratt; Roscoe Ates; David Landau
- Cinematography: J. Roy Hunt
- Edited by: Jack Kitchin
- Music by: Max Steiner
- Production company: RKO Pictures
- Distributed by: RKO Pictures
- Release date: April 28, 1932
- Running time: 73 minutes
- Country: United States
- Language: English

The Roadhouse Murder is a 1932 American pre-Code thriller directed by J. Walter Ruben and written by J. Walter Ruben and Gene Fowler and starring Dorothy Jordan, Eric Linden, Purnell Pratt, Roscoe Ates and David Landau. It was released on April 28, 1932, by RKO Pictures.

== Plot ==
Chick Brian, a young reporter, is stranded during a storm with his girlfriend Mary at the remote roadhouse called Lame Dog Inn. There they discover two murders were taking place: that of the doorman Charles Spengler and that of the only guest, Emil Brugger. Chick has the silly idea of incriminating himself in the crime, thinking that this will give him the opportunity to write a great story. Things go wrong and the electric chair looms...

== Cast ==
- Dorothy Jordan as Mary Agnew
- Eric Linden as Chick Brian
- Purnell Pratt as Inspector Agnew
- Roscoe Ates as Joyce
- David Landau as Kraft
- Bruce Cabot as Dykes
- Phyllis Clare as Louise Rand
- Gustav von Seyffertitz as Porter
- Roscoe Karns as Dale
- William Morris as Judge
- Frank Sheridan as District Attorney
- Carl Gerard as Defense Attorney
