= Amateur Daddy =

1932 film

- Theatrical release poster
- Directed by: John G. Blystone
- Screenplay by: Frank Dolan; Doris Malloy
- Starring: Warner Baxter; Marian Nixon; Rita La Roy; David Landau
- Cinematography: James Wong Howe
- Edited by: Louis R. Loeffler
- Music by: Hugo Friedhofer
- Production company: Fox Film Corporation
- Distributed by: Fox Film Corporation
- Release date: April 10, 1932
- Running time: 71 minutes
- Country: United States
- Language: English

Amateur Daddy is a 1932 American pre-Code drama film directed by John G. Blystone and written by Frank Dolan and Doris Malloy. The film stars Warner Baxter, Marian Nixon, Rita La Roy, and David Landau. The film was released on April 10, 1932, by Fox Film Corporation.

== Cast ==
- Warner Baxter as Jim Gladden
- Marian Nixon as Sally Smith
- Rita La Roy as Lotti Pelgram
- William Pawley as 2nd Fred Smith
- Lucille Powers as Olive Smith
- David Landau as Sam Pelgram
- Clarence Wilson as William J. 'Bill' Hansen
- Frankie Darro as Pete Smith
- Gail Kornfeld as Lily Smith
- Joe Hachey as Sam Pelgram, Jr.
- Edwin Stanley as 1st Fred Smith
- Joan Breslau as Nancy Smith
