= That's My Boy (1932 film) =

1932 film

- Film poster
- Directed by: Roy William Neill
- Written by: Norman Krasna; Francis Wallace
- Produced by: Roy William Neill
- Starring: Richard Cromwell; Dorothy Jordan; Mae Marsh
- Cinematography: Joseph H. August
- Edited by: Jack Dennis
- Distributed by: Columbia Pictures
- Release date: November 13, 1932
- Running time: 71 minutes
- Country: United States
- Language: English

That's My Boy is a 1932 American pre-Code drama film directed by Roy William Neill and starring Richard Cromwell and Dorothy Jordan. John Wayne had a very small uncredited role in the film.

== Plot ==
Expecting to become a doctor, Thomas Jefferson Scott enrolls at Thorpe University. A football coach there, "Daisy" Adams, finds out that while small, Tommy is quick and elusive and a natural at the sport. Tommy isn't interested in football, but jumps at the coach's offer of free tuition.

For the next two seasons, Tommy is a star player, nicknamed "Snakehips," and a hero on campus. But he resents that while he's worth a fortune to the college, he has little money and has jeopardized his future in medicine and with fiancée Dorothy by concentrating on football instead. Tommy demands $50,000. A university alumnus, Sedgwick, who is a stockbroker, sets up a holding company in which investors can put their money into Tommy's potential earnings.

Everything goes wrong. Sedgwick's investments are poor, he loses all of the money and commits suicide. Dorothy's father, who dislikes Tommy, tempts him with $50,000 if he will break off their engagement. Tommy thinks it over, then asks for $100,000. The crowd boos Tommy on the football field until the newspapers report that Tommy took the 100 grand and replenished the fund, ensuring everyone's investments. To the fans' cheers, Tommy wins the game for Thorpe, he ends up marrying Dorothy.

== Cast ==
- Richard Cromwell as Tommy Jefferson Scott
- Dorothy Jordan as Dorothy Whitney
- Mae Marsh as Mom Scott
- Arthur Stone as Pop Scott
- Douglass Dumbrille as Coach "Daisy" Adams
- Lucien Littlefield as Uncle Louie
- Leon Ames as Al Williams
- Russell Saunders as "Pinkie"
- Sumner Getchell as Carl
- Otis Harlan as Mayor
- Oscar 'Dutch' Hendrian as Hap
- Douglas Haig as Young Tommy Jefferson Scott
- John Wayne as Football Player (uncredited)

== See also ==
- List of American football films
