= Purnell Pratt =

American actor (1885–1941)

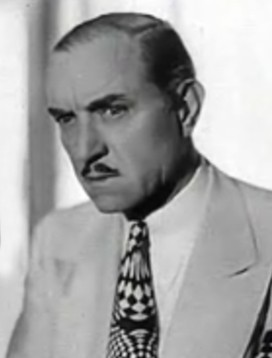
- Pratt in trailer for The Casino Murder Case (1935)
- Born: October 20, 1885; Bethel, Illinois, U.S.
- Died: July 25, 1941 (aged 55); Hollywood, California, U.S.
- Occupation: Actor
- Years active: 1914-1941

Purnell Pratt (October 20, 1885 – July 25, 1941) was an American film actor. He appeared in more than 110 films between 1914 and 1941. He was born in Bethel, Illinois and died in Hollywood, California.

Pratt spent more than a year in France in the U. S. military during World War I. He attended the University of Pennsylvania with plans to perform in opera. However, lacking funds and unable to obtain a hearing, he joined the chorus of a George M. Cohan production. He worked in Cohan's troupes for a decade. He was a featured player in the Broadway hit The Goose Hangs High during 1924.

== Partial filmography ==
- The Great Diamond Robbery (1914) - Maria's Brother
- Seven Keys to Baldpate (1917) - John Bland
- The Lady Who Lied (1925) - Ahmed
- The Flame Fighter (1925) - Mike Turney
- Phantom Police (1926) - Tracy Downs
- Midnight Lovers (1926) - Wibley
- Alibi (1929) - Police Sgt. Pete Manning
- Thru Different Eyes (1929) - Dist. Atty. Marston
- On with the Show! (1929) - Sam Bloom
- Fast Life (1929) - Berton Hall
- Is Everybody Happy? (1929) - Stage Manager
- The Trespasser (1929) - Hector Ferguson
- Painted Faces (1929) - Foreman of Jury
- The Locked Door (1929) - Police Officer (uncredited)
- Puttin' On the Ritz (1930) - George Barnes
- The Furies (1930) - District Attorney
- Road to Paradise (1930) - Police Inspector Updike
- Common Clay (1930) - Richard Fullerton
- Lawful Larceny (1930) - Judge Perry
- Sinners' Holiday (1930) - Detective Sikes (uncredited)
- The Silver Horde (1930) - Wayne Wayland
- The Gorilla (1930) - The Stranger
- Paid (1930) - Edward Gilder
- Dance, Fools, Dance (1931) - Parker
- The Prodigal (1931) - Rodman Farraday
- Beyond Victory (1931) - Minor Role (uncredited)
- Bachelor Apartment (1931) - Herb Carraway
- The Public Enemy (1931) - Officer Powers (uncredited)
- Up for Murder (1931) - William Winter
- The Public Defender (1931) - John Kirk
- Traveling Husbands (1931) - J. C. Wilson
- The Gay Diplomat (1931) - Colonel George Gorin
- Five Star Final (1931) - French
- The Spider (1931) - Inspector Riley
- The Secret Witness (1931) - Capt. McGowan
- Ladies of the Big House (1931) - John Hartman
- Emma (1932) - Haskins
- Scarface (1932) - Publisher Garston
- Grand Hotel (1932) - Zinnowitz
- The Roadhouse Murder (1932) - Inspector William Agnew
- The Famous Ferguson Case (1932) - George M. Ferguson
- Skyscraper Souls (1932) - Harrington Brewster (uncredited)
- Hat Check Girl (1932) - Collins (uncredited)
- False Faces (1932) - Jefferson Howe
- The Red-Haired Alibi (1932) - Police Inspector Regan
- The Unwritten Law (1932) - Stephen McBain
- Rasputin and the Empress (1932) - Officer Quieting Grand Duke Igor (uncredited)
- The Billion Dollar Scandal (1933) - Committee Chairman
- Pick-Up (1933) - Prosecuting Attorney
- I Cover the Waterfront (1933) - John Phelps
- A Shriek in the Night (1933) - Police Insp. Russell
- Headline Shooter (1933) - Eddie Edmunds - City Editor (uncredited)
- Midshipman Jack (1933) - Captain Rogers
- Love, Honor, and Oh Baby! (1933) - Marchall Durant
- The Sweetheart of Sigma Chi (1933) - Doctor
- The Chief (1933) - Al Morgan
- Son of a Sailor (1933) - Captain Briggs (uncredited)
- The Mystery Squadron (1933) - Lafe Johnson
- The Show-Off (1934) - John Preston (uncredited)
- Lazy River (1934) - Mr. Lodge - Attorney (uncredited)
- School for Girls (1934) - Inspector Jameson
- Men in White (1934) - Mr. Spencer (uncredited)
- The Witching Hour (1934) - District Attorney Robinson
- The Hell Cat (1934) - Butler
- Midnight Alibi (1934) - Wilson
- Name the Woman (1934) - Forbes
- Crimson Romance (1934) - Franklyn Pierce
- A Wicked Woman (1934) - Prosecuting Attorney (uncredited)
- The Band Plays On (1934) - Judge Bone (uncredited)
- The Secret Bride (1934) - District Attorney (uncredited)
- The Man Who Reclaimed His Head (1934) - Board Director (uncredited)
- The Winning Ticket (1935) - Mr. Powers
- Rendezvous at Midnight (1935) - The Mayor - Hamilton
- Death Flies East (1935) - Dr. Landers
- Behind the Green Lights (1935) - Detective Lt. Jim Kennedy
- The Casino Murder Case (1935) - District Attorney John Markham
- Black Fury (1935) - Henry B. Jenkins
- Ladies Crave Excitement (1935) - Amos Starke
- Diamond Jim (1935) - Physician
- Red Salute (1935) - Gen. Van Allen
- Waterfront Lady (1935) - Dist. Atty. Shaw
- It's in the Air (1935) - Horace McNab
- 1,000 Dollars a Minute (1935) - Charlie
- A Night at the Opera (1935) - Mayor (uncredited)
- Frisco Waterfront (1935) - Dr. Stevens
- Magnificent Obsession (1935) - Hastings (uncredited)
- Dancing Feet (1936) - Silas P. Jones
- The Return of Sophie Lang (1936) - Thomas Chadwick
- Hollywood Boulevard (1936) - Mr. Steinman
- Straight from the Shoulder (1936) - James McBride
- Lady Be Careful (1936) - Father
- Wives Never Know (1936) - Higgins
- Murder with Pictures (1936) - Editor
- Wedding Present (1936) - Howard Van Dorn
- The Plainsman (1936) - Capt. Wood
- Let's Make a Million (1936) - Gilbert
- Join the Marines (1937) - Col. J. B. Denbrough
- Murder Goes to College (1937) - President Arthur L. McShean
- King of Gamblers (1937) - Strohm
- Night of Mystery (1937) - John F. X. Markham
- Forlorn River (1937) - David Ward (uncredited)
- High, Wide, and Handsome (1937) - Col. Blake
- Under Suspicion (1937) - Frank Rogers
- Rosalie (1937) - Ship Captain (uncredited)
- Come On, Rangers (1938) - Senator Harvey
- My Wife's Relatives (1939) - Mr. Ellis
- Second Fiddle (1939) - Abbott, the Editor (scenes deleted)
- Colorado Sunset (1939) - Mr. Hall
- Grand Ole Opry (1940) - Attorney General
- Pot o' Gold (1941) - Thompson (uncredited)
- Blossoms in the Dust (1941) - Texas Senator (uncredited)
- Ringside Maisie (1941) - Dr. Taylor
- Life Begins for Andy Hardy (1941) - Dr. Storfen (uncredited)
- Doctors Don't Tell (1941) - (uncredited)
