= The Crime of the Century (1933 film) =

1933 film

- Directed by: William Beaudine
- Screenplay by: Florence Ryerson; Brian Marlow
- Based on: From the play. ('The Grootman Case') by Walter Maria Espe
- Produced by: B. P. Schulberg
- Starring: Jean Hersholt; Wynne Gibson; Stuart Erwin; Frances Dee
- Cinematography: David Abel
- Color process: Black and white
- Production company: Paramount Pictures
- Distributed by: Paramount Pictures
- Release date: February 18, 1933
- Running time: 74 minutes
- Country: United States
- Language: English

The Crime of the Century is a 1933 American Pre-Code mystery film directed by William Beaudine and featuring a star-studded cast including Jean Hersholt, Wynne Gibson, Stuart Erwin, Frances Dee, and David Landau.

== Plot ==
A bank official, whom a doctor had earlier hypnotized to obtain money from the bank's vault, is found murdered.

== Cast ==
- Jean Hersholt as Dr. Emil Brandt
- Wynne Gibson as Freda Brandt
- Stuart Erwin as Dan McKee
- Frances Dee as Doris Brandt
- Gordon Westcott as Gilbert Reid
- Robert Elliott as Police Capt. Timothy Riley
- David Landau as Police Lt. Frank Martin
- William Janney as Jim Brandt
- Bodil Rosing as Hilda Ericson - Maid
- Torben Meyer as Eric Ericson - Butler
- Samuel S. Hinds as Philip Ames

== Production ==
As of mid October 1932, the scenario was reportedly still being written by Endre Bohem and Florence Ryerson and filming was scheduled to begin November 16, 1932, though by December filming still had not started.
