= Dorothy Jordan (American actress) =

American actress (1906–1988)

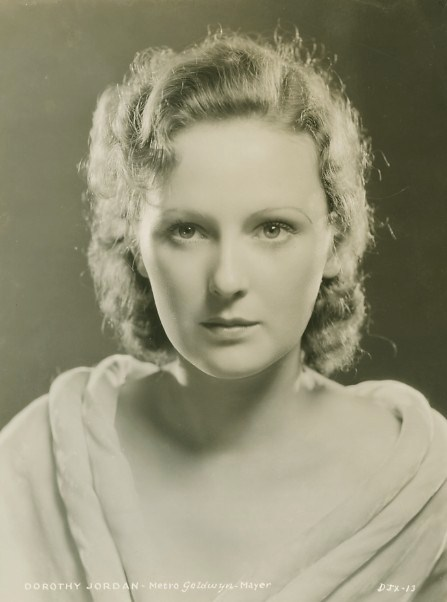
- Jordan in 1932
- Born: August 9, 1906; Clarksville, Tennessee, U.S.
- Died: December 7, 1988 (aged 82); Los Angeles, California, U.S.
- Occupation: Actress
- Years active: 1929–1933; 1953–1957
- Spouse(s): Paul J. Barnes (?); Merian C. Cooper (1933–1973) (his death) 3 children
- Children: 3

Dorothy Jordan (August 9, 1906 – December 7, 1988) was an American movie actress who had a short, successful career beginning in 1929.

== Career ==
Born in Clarksville, Tennessee, Jordan studied at what is now Rhodes College and the American Academy of Dramatic Arts. She performed in Broadway musicals, including Garrick Gaieties.

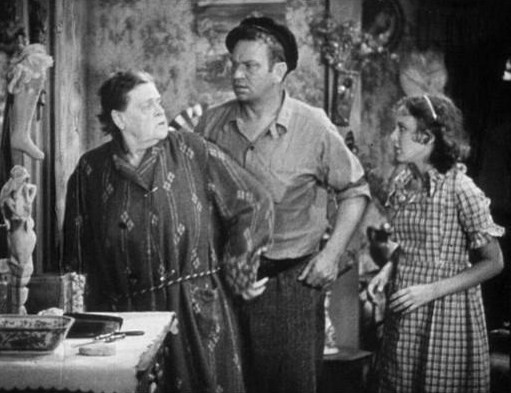
Dorothy Jordan (right) with Marie Dressler and Wallace Beery in Min and Bill

Jordan made her screen debut in the 1929 film The Taming of the Shrew. She made 22 more films in the next four years, including Min and Bill (1930) with Wallace Beery and Marie Dressler and The Cabin in the Cotton (1932) with Bette Davis. During this time, she appeared in films with Ramon Novarro, Clark Gable, Lionel Barrymore, Walter Huston and Jimmy Durante.

== Film retirement and return ==
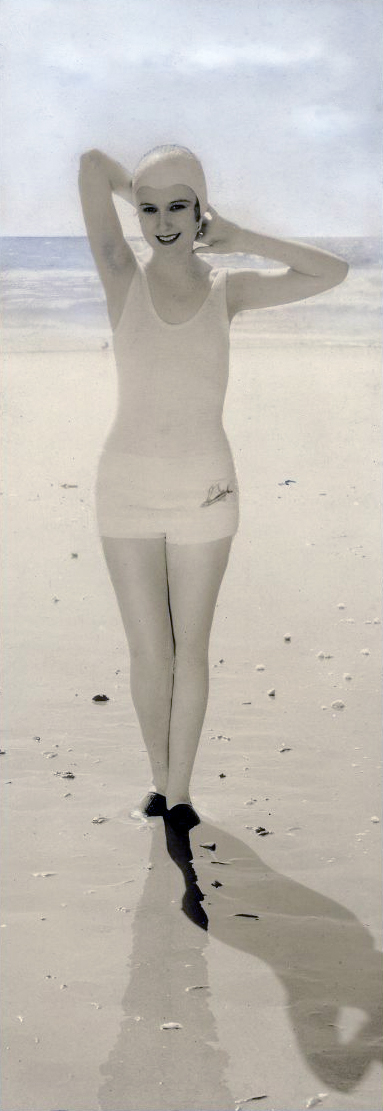
Dorothy Jordan in bathing-suit (1932)

In 1933, Jordan left films and married filmmaker and screenwriter Merian C. Cooper, who co-wrote, produced and directed the 1933 film King Kong. The couple had three children, a son and two daughters.

In 1937, Jordan came out of retirement to try for the role of Melanie Hamilton in Gone with the Wind. Cooper was a good friend of and frequent collaborator with Western director John Ford, forming Argosy Productions in 1947. It was for Argosy's The Sun Shines Bright, directed by Ford in 1953, that Jordan again came out of retirement for a small role. She had another small role as the sister-in-law of Ethan Edwards in the epic 1956 Argosy film The Searchers. Jordan appeared in a small role in the John Ford film The Wings of Eagles in 1957, then retired permanently.

== Later years ==
Jordan and Cooper lived in Coronado, California and remained married until his death of cancer on April 21, 1973. Jordan died of congestive heart failure on December 7, 1988, aged 82, in Cedars-Sinai Medical Center in Los Angeles, California. Her body was cremated at the Chapel of the Pines Crematory in Los Angeles, California, and her ashes scattered at sea.

== Filmography ==
Year	Title	Role	Notes
1929	Black Magic	Ann Bradbroke	
1929	Words and Music	Song and dance principal	
1929	The Taming of the Shrew	Bianca	
1929	Devil-May-Care	Leonie de Beaufort	
1930	In Gay Madrid	Carmiña Rivas	
1930	Call of the Flesh	Maria Consuelo Vargas	
1930	Love in the Rough	Marilyn Crawford	
1930	Min and Bill	Nancy Smith	
1931	A Tailor Made Man	Tanya	
1931	Shipmates	Kit Corbin	
1931	Young Sinners	Constance Sinclair	
1931	The Beloved Bachelor	Mitzi Stressman	
1931	Hell Divers	Ann Mitchell	
1932	The Lost Squadron	'Pest' Curwood	
1932	The Wet Parade	Maggie May 'Persimmon' Chilcote	
1932	The Roadhouse Murder	Mary Agnew	
1932	Down to Earth	Julia Pearson	
1932	70,000 Witnesses	Dorothy Clark	
1932	The Cabin in the Cotton	Betty Wright	
1932	That's My Boy	Dorothy Whitney	
1933	Strictly Personal	Mary O'Conner	
1933	Bondage	Judy Peters	
1933	One Man's Journey	Letty McGinnis	
1953	The Sun Shines Bright	Lucy Lee's mother	
1956	The Searchers	Martha Edwards	
1957	The Wings of Eagles	Rose Brentmann	
