= Harry Harrison Kroll =

American writer, illustrator and English professor

Harry Harrison Kroll (1888–1967) was an American writer, illustrator and English professor whose students included Jesse Stuart.

Kroll wrote the novel Cabin in the Cotton which was adapted into the film The Cabin in the Cotton. The University of Tennessee and Mississippi State University have collections of his papers. Richard Saunders wrote a book about him. Kroll is described as a Southern ruralist writer in a review of it by Ricky Cox.

The Cabin in the Cotton includes the famous line "I'd like ta kiss ya, but I just washed my hair."

== Bibliography ==
- The Cabin in the Cotton (1931)
- The Ghosts of Slave Driver's Bend (1937)
- Darker Grows the Valley
- Mounds in the Mist
- Perilous Journey: A Tale of the Mississippi River and the Natchez Trace (1943)
- The Ancient Grudge (1946)
- The Usurper
- Fury in the Earth: A Novel of the New Madrid Earthquake
- Riders in the Night (1965)
