= The Sun Shines Bright =

1953 film by John Ford

- Film poster
- Directed by: John Ford
- Screenplay by: Laurence Stallings
- Based on: The Sun Shines Bright; 1931 short stories in Cosmopolitan Magazine by Irvin S. Cobb; 1912 short story The Mob from Massac; The Sun Shines Bright "The Lord Provides" in The Saturday Evening Post (1915)
- Produced by: Merian C. Cooper; John Ford
- Starring: Charles Winninger; Arleen Whelan
- Cinematography: Archie Stout
- Edited by: Jack Murray
- Music by: Victor Young
- Color process: Black and white
- Production company: Argosy Pictures
- Distributed by: Republic Pictures
- Release date: May 2, 1953
- Running time: American theatrical cut: 92 minutes Director's cut: 101 minutes
- Country: United States
- Language: English
- Budget: $1,085,968

The Sun Shines Bright is a 1953 American comedy-drama Western film directed by John Ford, based on material taken from a series of Irvin S. Cobb "Judge Priest" short stories featured in The Saturday Evening Post in the 1910s, specifically "The Sun Shines Bright", "The Mob from Massac", and "The Lord Provides".

Ford had adapted some of the same material in 1934 in his film Judge Priest. That film originally had a scene depicting an attempted lynching of Poindexter (and Priest’s condemnation of the act), but it was cut by 20th Century Fox. The omission was one of the reasons Ford loosely reshaped the Cobb stories two decades later as The Sun Shines Bright for Republic Pictures, this time including Judge Priest's defusing of the mob determined to lynch a young black character named Woodford. In both films, Stepin Fetchit plays the part of Judge Priest's assistant, Poindexter.

In later years, the film was championed by critics such as Jonathan Rosenbaum and Dave Kehr, who called it "a masterpiece". Ford himself had often cited The Sun Shines Bright as his favorite among all his films. However Peter Bogdanovich, who knew Ford, surmised that the director's "perverse enthronement" of it as one of his very best was largely based on its general dismissal by critics and audiences, and had little to do with the merits of the film itself.

== Plot ==
In post-reconstruction United States, black sheep Ashby Corwin returns to his native Kentucky on a steamboat. He encounters young Lucy Lee, ward of Dr. Lake, and is struck by her beauty.

In court, Judge Billy Priest, who is a candidate for reelection to his post, adjudicates a number of cases, including finding a job for "Uncle Plez" Woodford's idle nephew, U. S. Grant Woodford. Ashby learns that while old General Fairfield is said to be the grandfather of Lucy, he denies it. On the street, after Lucy is the subject of insults by Buck Ramsey about her true heritage, Ashby gets into a whip fight with Buck before the judge comes by and puts a stop to it.

Lucy eventually discovers who her real mother is: a prostitute recently returned to town. Meanwhile, the daughter of Rufe Ramsuer is assaulted and young Woodford is blamed and arrested, causing racial tensions to rise and a large lynch mob to form. Violence seems imminent until Judge Priest confronts the mob at the jailhouse and defuses the confrontation with an eloquent and brilliant argument. Later, Rufe's daughter points to Buck as being her true attacker.

It is election day. Those in the lynch mob realize that Judge Priest has saved them from themselves, and they vote for him en masse, producing a tie with the other candidate, Horace K. Maydew (played by Milburn Stone). It is pointed out to the judge that he hasn't yet remembered to cast a ballot himself, so he wins reelection by a single vote: his own.

== Cast ==
- Charles Winninger as Judge William Pittman Priest
- Arleen Whelan as Lucy Lee Lake
- John Russell as Ashby Corwin
- Stepin Fetchit as Jeff Poindexter
- Russell Simpson as Dr. Lewt Lake
- Ludwig Stössel as Herman Felsburg (as Ludwig Stossel)
- Francis Ford as Feeney (Old Backwoodsman)
- Paul Hurst as Army Sgt. Jimmy Bagby
- Mitchell Lewis as Sheriff Andy Redcliffe
- Grant Withers as Buck Ramsey
- Milburn Stone as Horace K. Maydew
- Dorothy Jordan as Lucy Lee's mother
- Elzie Emanuel as U.S. Grant 'You Ess' Woodford
- Henry O'Neill as Joe D. Habersham
- Slim Pickens as Sterling, Lanky Backwoodsman
- James Kirkwood as General Fairfield
- Ernest Whitman as Pleasant 'Uncle Plez' Woodford
- Trevor Bardette as Rufe Ramseur
- Eve March as Mallie Cramp
- Hal Baylor as Rufe Ramseur Jr.
- Jane Darwell as Mrs. Aurora Ratchitt
- Ken Williams as Maydew's Henchman
- Clarence Muse as Uncle Zack
- Mae Marsh as G.A.R. Woman at the Ball

== Release ==
The film was entered into the 1953 Cannes Film Festival.

Herbert J. Yates, the head of Republic Pictures, had about ten minutes cut from the film against Ford's wishes. According to film historian Joseph McBride, the full 100-minute version (which did play theatrically overseas) was rediscovered when Republic inadvertently used it as a master for the 1990 videotape release. This full version is currently available from Olive Films as a high-definition Blu-ray release.

== See also ==
- John Ford filmography
