= Judge Priest =

1934 film directed by John Ford

- Theatrical release poster
- Directed by: John Ford
- Written by: Irvin S. Cobb; Dudley Nichols; Lamar Trotti
- Produced by: Sol M. Wurtzel
- Starring: Will Rogers; Tom Brown; Anita Louise; Henry B. Walthall; David Landau; Stepin Fetchit
- Cinematography: George Schneiderman
- Edited by: Paul Weatherwax
- Music by: Cyril J. Mockridge; Samuel Kaylin (uncredited)
- Production company: Fox Film Corporation
- Distributed by: Fox Film Corporation
- Release date: September 28, 1934
- Running time: 80 minutes
- Country: United States
- Language: English
- Box office: $1.176 million (U.S. and Canada rentals)

Judge Priest is a 1934 American comedy film starring Will Rogers. The film was directed by John Ford, produced by Sol M. Wurtzel in association with Fox Film Corporation, and based on humorist Irvin S. Cobb's character Judge Priest. The picture is set in post-reconstruction Kentucky, with Tom Brown, Anita Louise, Henry Walthall, David Landau, and Stepin Fetchit in support. It was remade by Ford in 1953 as The Sun Shines Bright.

== Plot ==
The full film

Personable Judge Priest (Will Rogers), known to his contemporaries as "Billy", presides over court in Fairfield, Kentucky, in 1890; Jeff Poindexter is accused of chicken theft. Senator Horace Maydew, a rival in an election bid to the judge's seat, is the prosecuting attorney in Jeff's case. After some distraction by Priest and the court onlookers, Jeff is found innocent. Priest befriends Jeff and goes fishing with him after court and hires him in his household. Priest's nephew, Jerome "Rome" Priest has just returned home after studying law and passing the bar, and attempts to rekindle his romance with Ellie May Gillespie, but she explains that she now has other interests. Rome's mother, Mrs. Caroline Priest, has made it her business to enforce propriety and makes it known that she is completely against a match between her son, Rome, and Ellie May, as the young woman's father has been absent and is unknown. Mrs. Priest is vocal about her hopes that Maydew's daughter, Virginia, would be a proper societal match for Rome, and pushes him in that direction.

While visiting his late wife's grave, Priest takes note of local townsman, Bob Gillis, who places flowers on Ellie May's late mother's grave. Uncouth barber, Flem Talley, has been courting Ellie May, but his unwelcome advances towards Ellie May makes it appear that he's not looking for her hand in marriage.

Flem's barber shop is a busy place, both Priest and Gillis wait their turn as Flem jokes about his courtship of Ellie Mae not heading towards marriage because she "ain't got no Pa". Gillis is immediately offended and punches Flem in the face, knocking him down. Priest expresses his relative approval, which later becomes an argument of bias by Senator Maydew that forces Priest to recuse himself when Gillis is tried for assault. He is accused of assaulting Flem at the pool hall, when in fact Gillis was defending himself from an attack by Flem and two others. Rome is very enthusiastic about representing Gillis in court, as he will be Rome's first client as attorney. The Senator pushes hard for a guilty verdict, but Reverend Ashby Brand has information that will demonstrate Gillis' long standing good moral character which Priest helps to reveal as associate counsel for the defense. The identity of Ellie May's father is also revealed, Gillis, which leads to Mrs. Priest's approval of Ellie May as a match for her son, Rome.

== Cast ==
- Will Rogers as Judge William 'Billy' Priest
- Tom Brown as Jerome Priest
- Anita Louise as Ellie May Gillespie
- Henry B. Walthall as Reverend Ashby Brand
- David Landau as Bob Gillis
- Rochelle Hudson as Virginia Maydew
- Roger Imhof as Billy Gaynor
- Frank Melton as Flem Talley
- Charley Grapewin as Sergeant Jimmy Bagby
- Berton Churchill as Senator Horace Maydew
- Brenda Fowler as Mrs. Caroline Priest
- Francis Ford as Juror No. 12
- Hattie McDaniel as Aunt Dilsey
- Stepin Fetchit as Jeff Poindexter

== Production notes ==
=== Will Rogers ===
The film played a major role in earning Will Rogers recognition as the number one box office star of 1934. Rogers received critical praise for his performance, some noting that Rogers fell right into the role with his heart-warming personality. Rogers managed a balance of comedic one-liners and serious dramatics. The Tulsa Daily World summed up Rogers' performance: "The star's portrayal of Judge Priest has the mark of authenticity upon it … the unique blending of unique talent with a rich and splendid role." Rogers was killed in a plane crash just a year after the release of Judge Priest.

=== Stepin Fetchit ===
In the role as Jeff Poindexter, director John Ford gave Stepin Fetchit some room to expand his comic performance. When Judge Priest asks Jeff why he is not wearing his shoes, Fetchit comically ad libs, "I’m saving them for when my feet wear out." Fetchit was known for attending lavish parties and causing mischief while off the studio lot. Right before the shooting of Judge Priest, Fetchit caused a commotion at a benefit show at the Apollo Theater in New York City. When he arrived back in Hollywood for the filming of Judge Priest, Fetchit's behavior was much better. In fact, only once was Fetchit late for a shoot (he had forgotten his make-up kit).

=== Hattie McDaniel ===
Hattie McDaniel (last name appears as "McDaniels" in the opening credits) was just beginning her trek to stardom when she shot Judge Priest. Before this film she was a relatively unknown actress. Stepin Fetchit apparently doubted her acting abilities at the beginning of the production, but soon realized he was working with a very talented performer. Director John Ford noted McDaniel's acting talents. Ford cut some of Fetchit's scenes and gave McDaniel additional scenes. This created an initial rift between these two pioneering black actors.

== Reception ==
The film was a success at the box office. It was one of Fox's biggest hits of the year, with five of the studio's seven big hits starring him.

In 1998, Jonathan Rosenbaum of the Chicago Reader included the film in his unranked list of the best American films not included on the AFI Top 100. In an article about underrated Ford films, Rosenbaum wrote: "There’s certainly no other Ford movie that I know that comes closer to celebrating the idyllic 19th century America of Mark Twain, expressing nostalgia for the snug, leisurely life in closely interknit small-town communities. But for me the real triumphs of this laid-back masterpiece are the performances — especially those of Will Rogers, Stepin Fetchit, and, in the film's courtroom climax, Henry B. Walthall".

Dave Kehr wrote in 1985 that Judge Priest is "one of the most deeply felt visions of community in the American cinema. Ford's later partial remake, The Sun Shines Bright, is a masterpiece, but the accomplishments of this version are impressive enough. In some ways, Judge Priest marks the birth of the poet in Ford".

== Music ==
- "My Old Kentucky Home, Good Night" (Music and lyrics by Stephen Foster) – Sung by Hattie McDaniel, Melba Brown, Thelma Brown, Vera Brown, Will Rogers and others
- "Aunt Dilsey's Improvisation" (Written by Hattie McDaniel) – Sung by Hattie McDaniel
- "Love's Old Sweet Song (Just a Song at Twilight)" (Music by J.L. Molloy, lyrics by J. Clifton Bingham)
- "Massa Jesus Wrote Me a Note" (Music by Cyril J. Mockridge, lyrics by Dudley Nichols and Lamar Trotti) – Sung by Hattie McDaniel and others at the festival
- "Old Folks at Home (Swanee River)" (Written by Stephen Foster)
- "Old Black Joe" (Written by Stephen Foster)
- "(I Wish I Was in) Dixie's Land" (Written by Daniel Decatur Emmett)
- "Little Brown Jug" (Music and lyrics by Joseph Winner) – Sung by Hattie McDaniel
- "Aunt Dilsey's Song" (Music by Cyril J. Mockridge, lyrics by Dudley Nichols and Lamar Trotti) – Sung by Hattie McDaniel

== See also ==
- The Sun Shines Bright, John Ford's 1953 film based on the same original material by Irvin S. Cobb
- List of films in the public domain in the United States
