= It's Tough to Be Famous =

1932 film

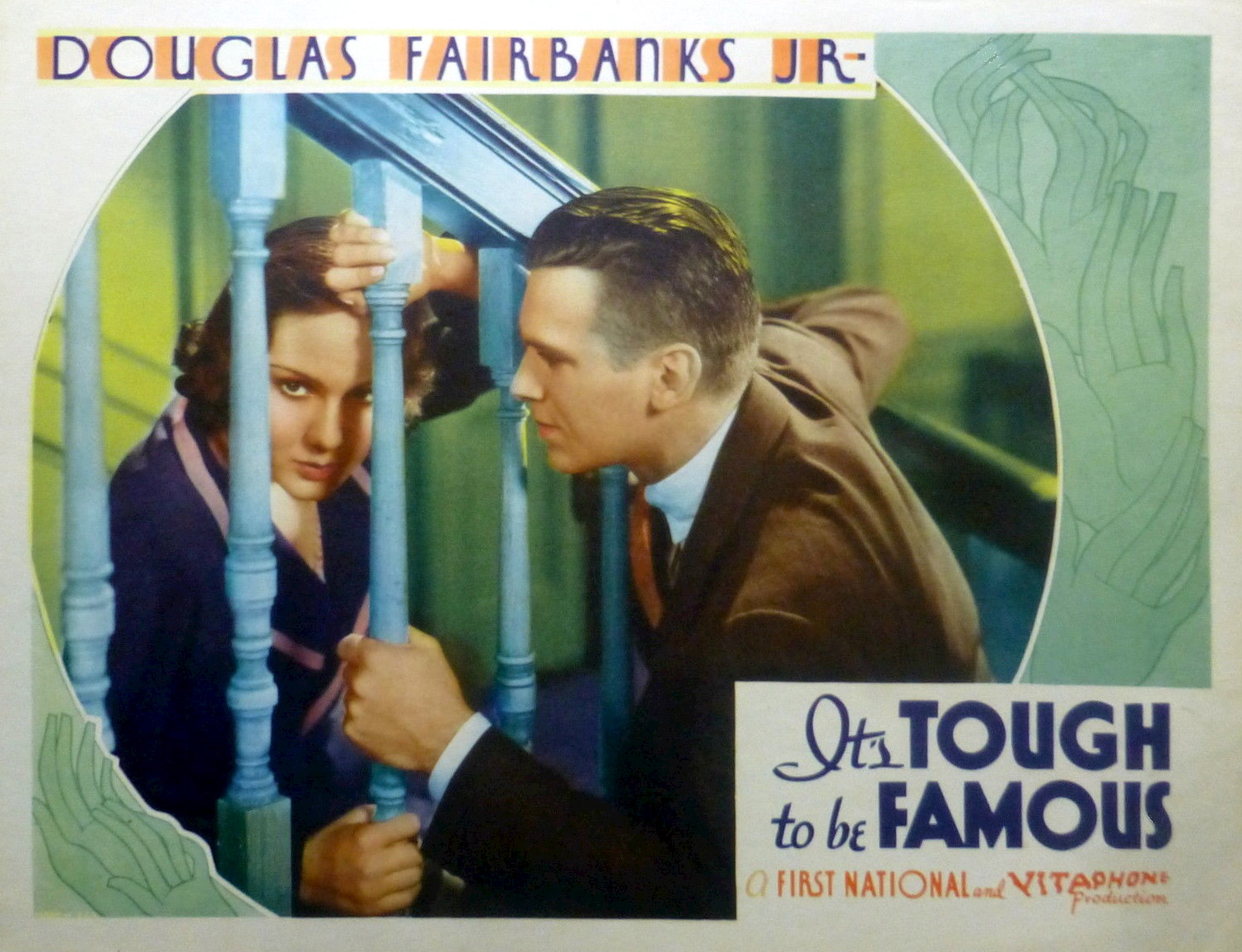
- Lobby card
- Directed by: Alfred E. Green
- Screenplay by: Robert Lord
- Based on: The Goldfish Bowl; 1932 novel by Mary C. McCall Jr.
- Starring: Douglas Fairbanks Jr. Mary Brian; Harold Minjir; Emma Dunn; Walter Catlett; David Landau
- Cinematography: Byron Haskin; Sol Polito
- Edited by: Ray Curtiss
- Music by: Leo F. Forbstein
- Production company: First National Pictures
- Distributed by: Warner Bros. Pictures, Inc.
- Release date: April 2, 1932
- Running time: 79 minutes
- Country: United States
- Language: English

It's Tough to Be Famous is a 1932 American pre-Code comedy film directed by Alfred E. Green and written by Robert Lord. The film stars Douglas Fairbanks Jr., Mary Brian, Emma Dunn, Walter Catlett and David Landau. It was released by Warner Bros. Pictures on April 2, 1932.

== Plot ==
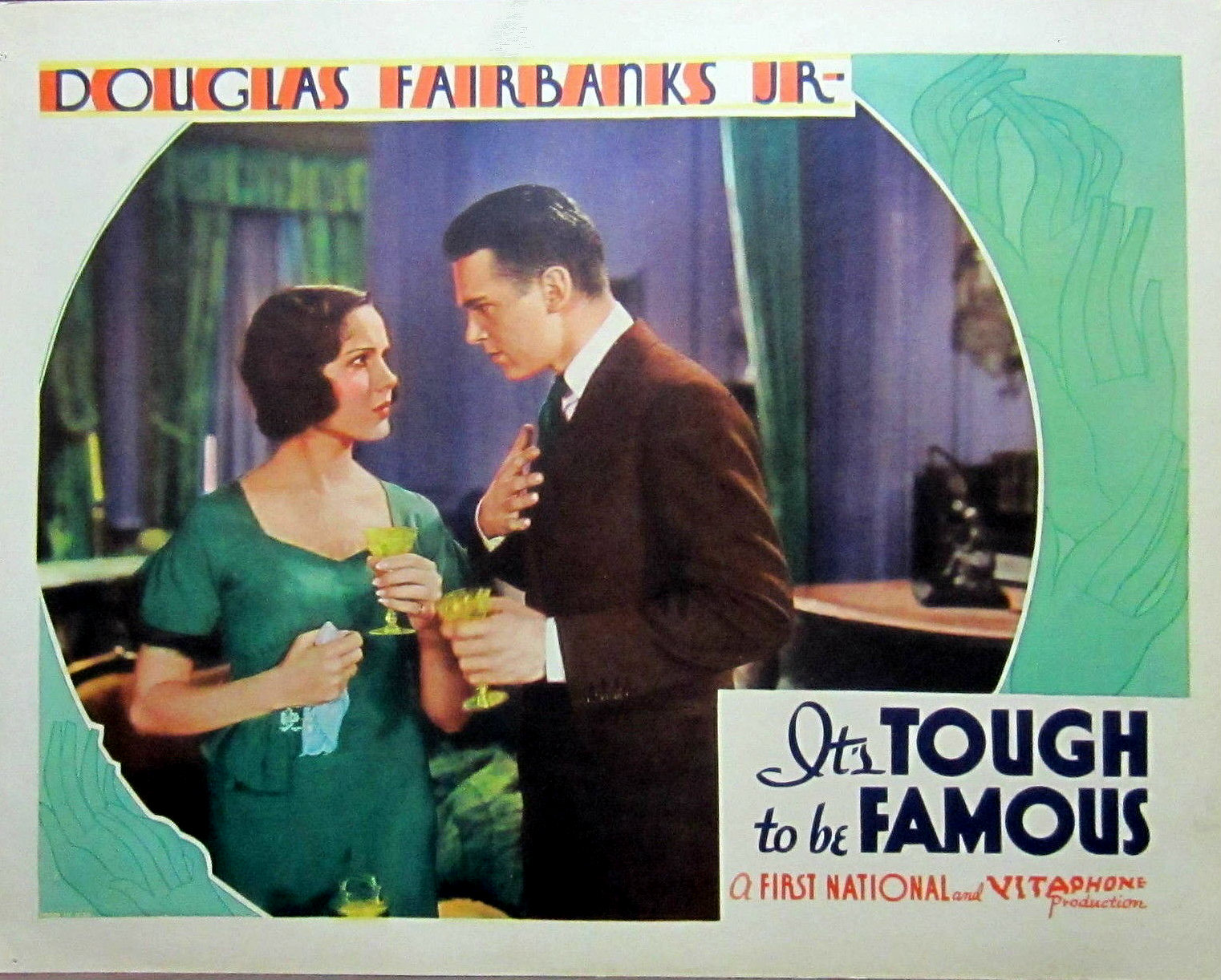
Lobby card

When his submarine is sunk by an excursion boat, Scott "Scotty" McClenahan helps rescue his crew and then resolves to sacrifice his life to save an older sailor. However, divers are able to save Scotty and his heroics make him a hero. He retires from the navy as a commander to widespread popular acclaim, and a parade is held in his honor. His marriage to his sweetheart Janet is headline news. However, the demands of the public, the press and his agent are overwhelming, and Janet leaves him just as a new hero begins to grab the spotlight. Scotty reconciles with Janet.

== Cast ==
- Douglas Fairbanks Jr. as Scott "Scotty" McClenahan
- Mary Brian as Janet Porter McClenahan
- Harold Minjir as Sutter
- Emma Dunn as "Moms" McClenahan
- Walter Catlett as Joseph Craig "Joe" Chapin
- David Landau as Chief Petty Officer Steve Stevens
- Oscar Apfel as S.J. Boynton
- J. Carrol Naish as Lt. Blake
- Louise Beavers as Ada
- Lilian Bond as Edna Jackson
