= The Cabin in the Cotton =

1932 film

- Theatrical release poster
- Directed by: Michael Curtiz
- Screenplay by: Paul Green
- Based on: The Cabin in the Cotton by Harry Harrison Kroll
- Produced by: Hal B. Wallis; Darryl F. Zanuck; Jack L. Warner
- Starring: Richard Barthelmess; Dorothy Jordan; Bette Davis
- Cinematography: Barney McGill
- Edited by: George Amy
- Music by: Leo F. Forbstein
- Production company: First National Pictures
- Distributed by: Warner Bros. Pictures
- Release date: October 15, 1932
- Running time: 78 minutes
- Country: United States
- Language: English

The Cabin in the Cotton is a 1932 American pre-Code drama film directed by Michael Curtiz. The screenplay by Paul Green is based on the novel of the same title by Harry Harrison Kroll.

The film perhaps is best known for a line of dialogue spoken by a platinum-blonde Bette Davis in a Southern drawl — "I'd like ta kiss ya, but I just washed my hair." — a line lifted directly from the book. In later years, it was immortalized by Davis impersonators and quoted in the 1995 film, Get Shorty.

== Plot ==
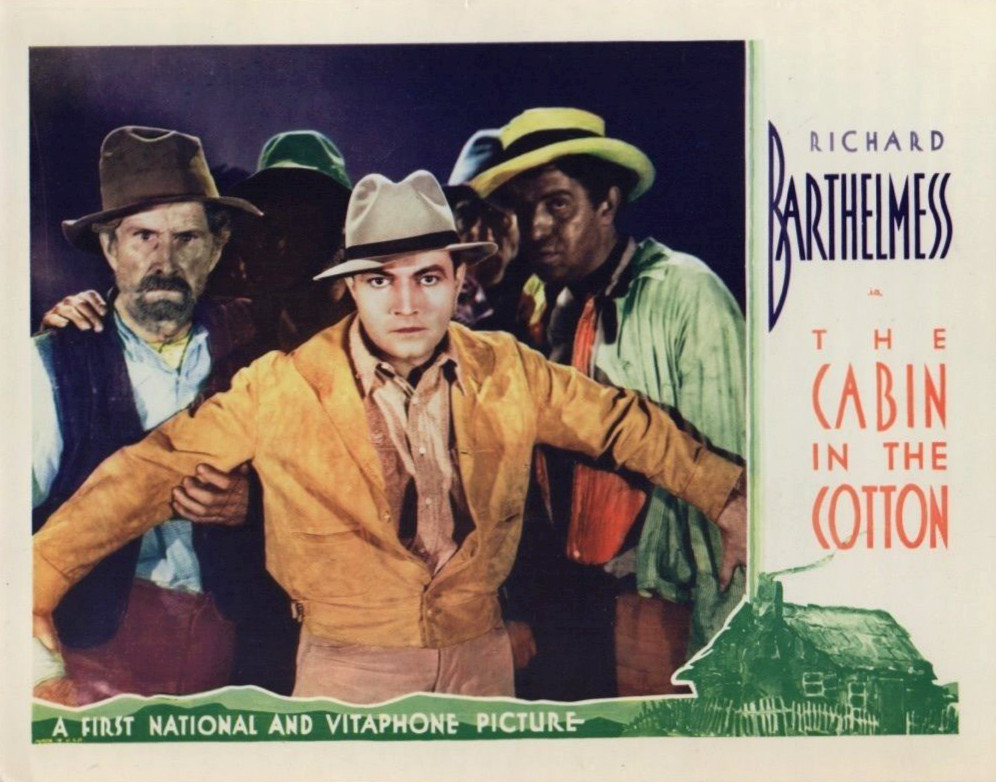
Lobby card for The Cabin in the Cotton

Marvin Blake is a sharecropper's son who wants to better himself by continued schooling instead of working in the fields under the heat in the Deep South. Initially, greedy planter Lane Norwood is opposed to the idea and says he needs to work in his fields, but after the sudden death of his over-worked father, he grudgingly helps Blake achieve his goal and gives the young man a job as a bookkeeper when his vampish daughter Madge intercedes on his behalf. Blake uncovers irregularities in Norwood's accounts and soon becomes embroiled in a battle between management and workers and torn between the seductive Madge and his longtime sweetheart Betty Wright.

== Cast ==
- Richard Barthelmess as Marvin Blake
- Dorothy Jordan as Betty Wright
- Bette Davis as Madge Norwood
- Hardie Albright as Roland Neal
- David Landau as Tom Blake
- Berton Churchill as Lane Norwood
- Dorothy Peterson as Lilly Blake
- Russell Simpson as Uncle Joe
- Tully Marshall as Slick
- Henry B. Walthall as Eph Clinton
- Edmund Breese as Holmes Scott
- John Marston as Russell Carter
- Erville Alderson as Sock Fisher
- William Le Maire as Jake Fisher
- Clarence Muse as A Blind Negro
- Harry Cording as Ross Clinton (uncredited)

== Production ==
When producer Darryl F. Zanuck urged Michael Curtiz to cast Bette Davis as Madge Norwood, the director responded "Are you kidding? Who would want to go to bed with her?" Angry that he was forced to use her against his will, Curtiz fumed throughout the shoot, loudly deriding her as "a goddamned lousy actress" or calling her a "God-damned-nothing-no-good-sexless-son-of-a-bitch!" under his breath during her love scenes with Richard Barthelmess. In later years, Davis said "Mr. Curtiz, I must say, monster as he was, was a great European moviemaker. He was not a performer's director...You had to be very strong with him. And he wasn't fun...He was a real bastard! Cruelest man I have ever known. But he knew how to shoot a film well." She made six additional films with Curtiz, including The Private Lives of Elizabeth and Essex in 1939.

Davis liked Barthelmess personally but was stymied by his acting style. "He did absolutely nothing in the long shots, followed basic stage directions for medium shots, and reserved his talent for the close-ups. In that way, it was necessary to use his close-ups almost entirely." Barthelmess said of Davis "There was a lot of passion in her, and it was impossible not to sense...one got the sense of a lot of feeling dammed up in her, a lot of electricity that had not yet found its outlet. In a way it was rather disconcerting - yes, I admit it, frightening."

Davis later confessed she was a virgin when she made the film. "Yes, that's absolutely true. No question about it," she added for emphasis. "But my part called for me to exude raging sexuality. Well, if they had known I was still a virgin, they wouldn't have believed I could carry it off. They wouldn't have trusted me if they'd known, but no one asked. It was assumed that a young actress had lived a bit of a loose life."

== Critical reception ==
In his review in The New York Times, Mordaunt Hall described it as "a film which seldom awakens any keen interest...Richard Barthelmess gives a careful but hardly an inspired performance. His general demeanor lacks the desired spontaneity and often he speaks his lines in a monotone...Michael Curtiz is responsible for the direction, which is uneven, and sections of the narrative are rather muddled."

The Cabin in the Cotton was one of nine 1932 releases in which Davis appeared. Still relatively unknown, she managed to draw the attention of many critics with her performance. In the New York American, Regina Crewe described her as "superb." Richard Watts, Jr. of the New York Herald Tribune stated "Miss Davis shows a surprising vivacity as the seductive rich girl," and Variety declared that her "rising popularity is the film's best chance for business." Davis also caught the eye of director John Cromwell, who was impressed and then cast her as Mildred in his 1934 film Of Human Bondage, which started Davis' reputation as one of the best actresses of the era.
