= The World Moves On =

1934 film directed by John Ford

- 1934 theatrical poster
- Directed by: John Ford
- Written by: Reginald Berkeley
- Produced by: Winfield R. Sheehan
- Starring: Madeleine Carroll; Franchot Tone
- Cinematography: George Schneiderman
- Edited by: Paul Weatherwax
- Distributed by: Fox Film Corporation
- Release date: June 28, 1934
- Running time: 104 minutes
- Country: United States
- Language: English

The World Moves On is a 1934 American drama film directed by John Ford and starring Madeleine Carroll and Franchot Tone. It was the first Hollywood code approved film.

== Plot ==
In 1825, two families, cotton merchants in England and America, with branches in France and Prussia swear to stand by each other in a belief that a great business firmly established in four countries will be able to withstand even such another calamity as the Napoleonic Wars from which Europe is slowly recovering. Then many years later, along comes World War I and the years that follow, to test the businesses.

== Cast ==
- Madeleine Carroll as Mrs. Warburton, 1825/Mary Warburton Girard, 1914
- Franchot Tone as Richard Girard
- Reginald Denny as Erik von Gerhardt
- Sig Ruman as Baron von Gerhardt (as Siegfried Rumann)
- Louise Dresser as Baroness von Gerhardt
- Raul Roulien as Carlos Girard (1825) / Henri Girard (1914)
- Stepin Fetchit as Dixie
- Lumsden Hare as Gabriel Warburton (1825) / Sir John Warburton (1914)
- Dudley Digges as Mr. Manning
- Frank Melton as John Girard (1825)
- Brenda Fowler as Madame Agnes Girard (1825)
- Russell Simpson as Notary (1825)
- Walter McGrail as The Duallist (1825)
- Marcelle Corday as Madame Girard II (1914)
- Charles Bastin as Jacques Girard, the Boy (1914)
- Barry Norton as Jacques Girard (1924)
- George Irving as Charles Girard (1914)
- Ferdinand Schumann-Heink as Fritz von Gerhardt
- Georgette Rhodes as Jeanne Girard
- Claude King as Colonel Braithwaite
- Ivan F. Simpson as Clumber (as Ivan Simpson)
- Frank Moran as Sergeant Culbert, Soldier in Trench

== Production notes ==
Most of the World War I battle footage was taken from the 1932 French film Wooden Crosses. This film was the first to receive an MPPDA (now, the MPA) certificate under the new Production Code, and received certificate #1.

== Reception ==
Mordaunt Hall of The New York Times called it "an ambitious undertaking, well composed and photographed, but it does seem as though the film would be all the better if it were shortened." Variety said it was "an impressive picture", although the first half-hour was "undeniably slow." "Impressive in magnitude and well cast", reported Film Daily. John Mosher of The New Yorker panned it as "a completely synthetic affair" that was "padded out to the limit". The Chicago Tribune called it "a moving tale" and "well worth your time", with "but one fault – extreme length."

== Awards ==
John Ford won the Special Recommendation award at the 1934 Venice Film Festival for this film.
