= The Wet Parade =

1932 film

- Directed by: Victor Fleming
- Written by: John Lee Mahin
- Based on: The Wet Parade; 1931 novel by Upton Sinclair
- Produced by: Hunt Stromberg
- Starring: Jimmy Durante; Myrna Loy; Robert Young; Walter Huston
- Cinematography: George Barnes
- Edited by: Anne Bauchens
- Music by: Dr. William Axt
- Production company: Metro-Goldwyn-Mayer
- Distributed by: Loew's Inc.
- Release date: March 26, 1932
- Running time: 118 minutes
- Country: United States
- Language: English

The Wet Parade is a 1932 American pre-Code drama film directed by Victor Fleming and starring Robert Young, Myrna Loy, Walter Huston, Lewis Stone and Jimmy Durante. It is based on the 1931 novel by Upton Sinclair. The film shows how two families are devastated by the effects of alcohol consumption and Prohibition. In addition to the main story, many small vignettes illustrate the theme, such as a three-minute segment that documents the many steps in the creation of counterfeit imported liquor. When the film was released in March 1932, Prohibition had been law for almost 13 years and would not end until December 5, 1933 with the passage of the 21st Amendment.

== Plot ==
In 1916, Maggie May Chilcote of Louisiana looks after her heavy-drinking father Roger, tying his shoes for him and retrieving him when he makes a spectacle of himself in public. Roger embarks on a drinking and gambling spree and loses most of the family's money. In the agonies of withdrawal, he kills himself. After the funeral, his friends toast him but Maggie vows to fight the scourge of alcohol abuse.

Maggie's brother Roger Jr., a writer, moves to New York City when his novel is accepted. His college friend, newspaper reporter Jerry Tyler, rents him a room in the modest hotel where he lives. Pow Tarleton, another drunkard who wasted his family resources, owns the hotel and his wife Bertha and their son Kip manage it. Pow stumps for Woodrow Wilson's successful reelection campaign, for the free drinks as well as the politics.

Jerry enlists to fight in World War I. After the war ends, the 18th Amendment becomes law in 1919 despite President Wilson's veto.

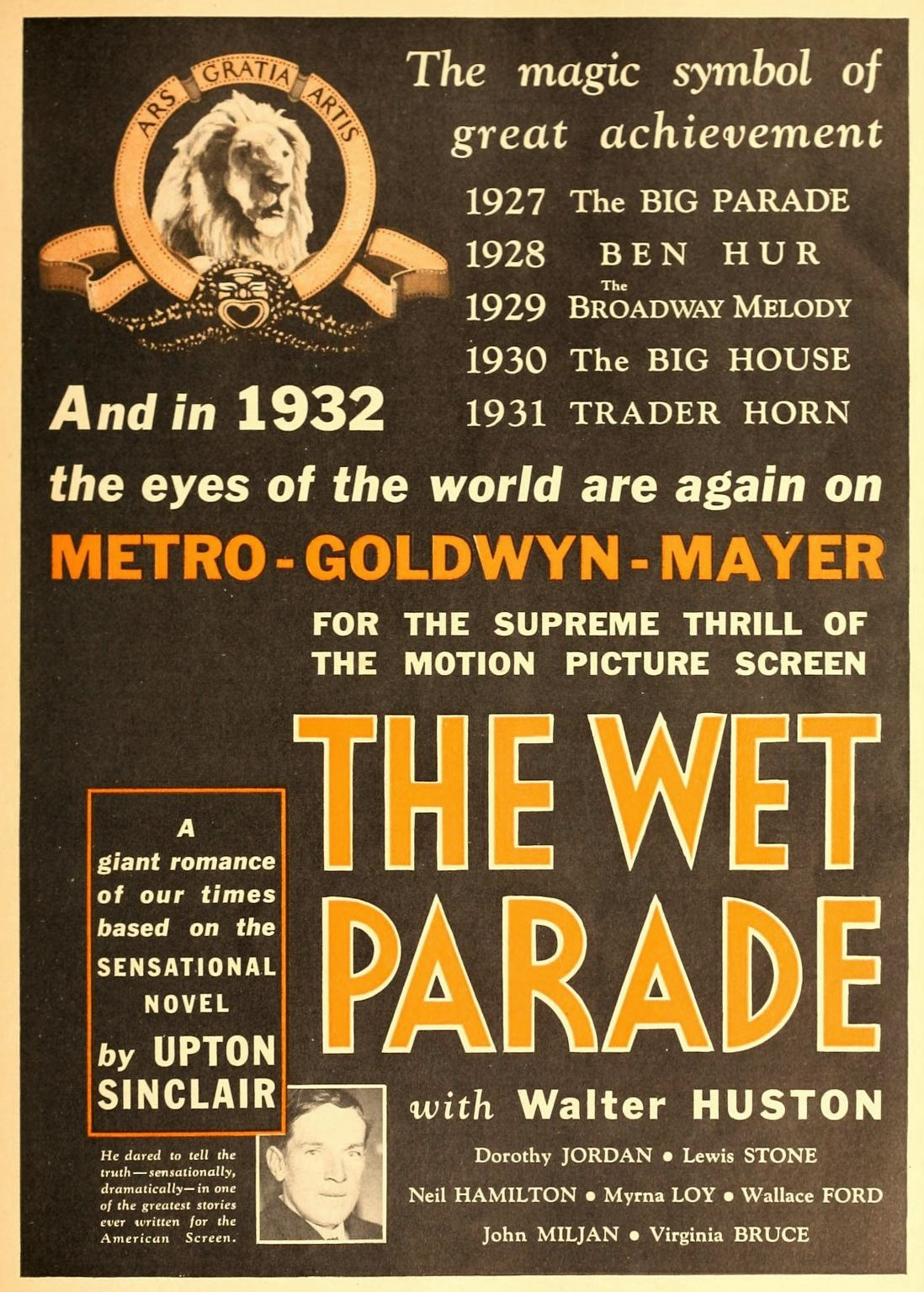
1932 ad

Maggie May comes to the hotel to meet her brother, and a flirtatious Pow shows her to Roger's room, assuming that she is a prostitute. Kip runs upstairs to evict her and is shattered when he learns the truth. Roger discovers that Pow has replaced all of Roger's liquor with water. Maggie May realizes that she and Kip have been fighting the same battle, and they warm to each other. She and Roger visit relatives on Long Island, supposedly far from temptation.

On June 29, 1919, many hoard liquor and try to drink as much as possible before midnight. At a lavish party thrown by the Chilcotes' cousins, whose bar is stocked by a boat from Bermuda, Roger is smitten with actress Eileen Pinchon.

Bertha tries to wrest a bottle of bad liquor away from Pow. When it breaks, he beats her to death while she screams that Prohibition is in effect now. Maggie May comforts the devastated Kip. Pow is sentenced to life imprisonment.

Kip does not renew the lease on the hotel, leaving some guests wondering how to move the liquor stored in their rooms. Maggie May comforts Kip and is stunned when she confesses her love for him. They marry, and Kip joins the U.S. Department of the Treasury.

Kip's boss, the Major, doesn't believe in Prohibition but will enforce it with only a fraction of the resources needed. He assigns Kip a partner, Abe Schilling, a quirky, experienced agent. In a bar, they watch teenagers drinking. When their cover is blown, they are beaten and ejected from the bar. A crook warns Kip that bootleggers are forming an association. Maggie tells Kip that she is pregnant.

The gangsters organize all over the country with systems of bribery and terror and the financial backing of many businessmen. At Eileen's speakeasy, a glamorous nightclub frequented by celebrities, Abe announces a raid, and the cops smash everything. Roger, a major investor in the club, is shaken. Roger wakes up sick and blind and Eileen runs away. An ophthalmologist says that he has seen hundreds of cases like it since Prohibition began; some bootleggers have not removed the methyl mixed into the alcohol to render it undrinkable. Roger moves in with Kip and Maggie and learns braille.

Kip promises justice for Roger. The Major signs the warrant but says that it is futile, expounding on the failures of Prohibition. With Maggie about to give birth, Kip is kidnapped from the hospital by gangsters who plan to make his horrible death a warning. Abe saves him but is shot. He dies in Kip's arms, telling him to quit the department because it its efforts are futile and that taking care of his family comes first. At the hospital, Kip looks at his tiny son, “born into an awful mess...Before they pull him into it, I guess they'll have it all figured out.”

Book was read by Mahatma Gandhi while in Erawada jail

== Cast ==
- Walter Huston as Pow Tarleton
- Wallace Ford as Jerry Tyler
- Dorothy Jordan as Maggie May Chilcote
- Robert Young as Kip Tarleton
- Lewis Stone as Roger Chilcote
- Neil Hamilton as Roger Chilcote, Jr.
- Jimmy Durante as Abe Schilling
- Myrna Loy as Eileen Pinchon

== Production ==
The AFI catalog states that MGM paid $18,000 ($287,000 in 2020) for the rights to Upton Sinclair's novel. However, TCM lists the price as $20,000 ($319,000 in 2020).

In the book, Kip is killed, and Maggie May rallies the women of America for enforcement, financial support and community action. The book ends with her slogan: "Prohibition hasn't failed! Prohibition hasn't been tried! Try it!"

== Reception ==
In a contemporary review, New York Times critic Mordaunt Hall criticized the film for being too long but praised all of the major performances. He wrote:

"Possibly one of the best episodes is that revealing the making of intoxicating drinks in this city. There is the printing of labels of all sorts, the pouring of denatured alcohol into barrels, the filling of bottles, the corking machine, sticking labels on bottles, clamping the tinfoil over the corks, the stamping of "Canada" on gunnysacks, wetting the sacks, passing them through salt; and then, after they are filled with a dozen bottles, they are sewn up and ready for the unfortunate consumer. Certainly this is enough to make many fight shy of bootlegged whisky."

Leonard Maltin awarded the film 2.5 out of 4 stars, calling it "strange but interesting."

Introducing the film in February 2020, Eddie Muller called it "an unusual mix of historical documentary, family melodrama and crime movie."
