= Hadley Waters =

American playwright

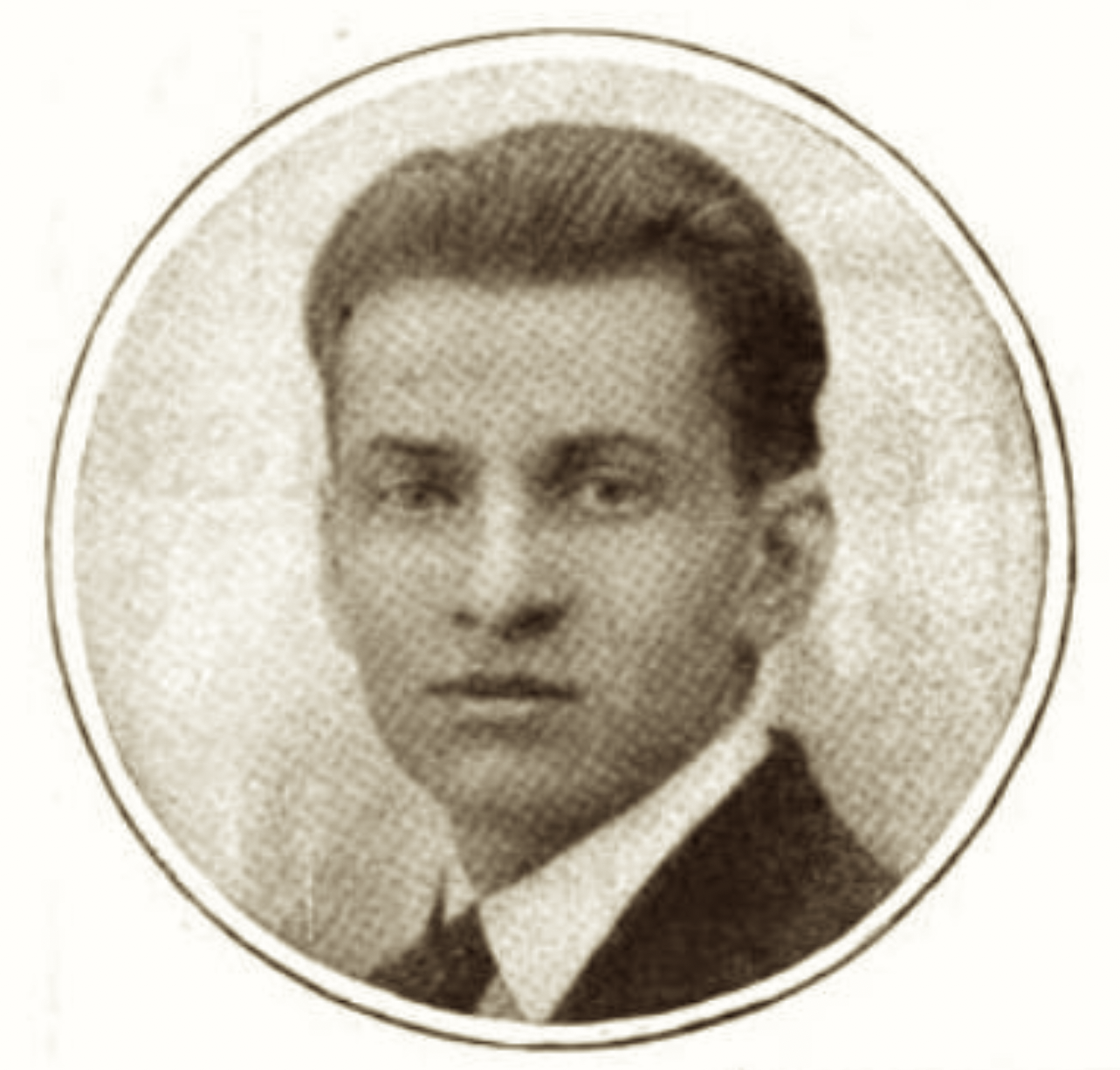
Hadley Waters in 1920.

Theodore Hadley Waters, better known as Hadley Waters or T. Hadley Waters, (26 December 1896 – 13 November 1964) was an American playwright. He was best known for two plays that were staged on Broadway: The Ghost Parade and Little Orchid Annie.

== Life and career ==
The son of Theodore Waters, Theodore "Theo" Hadley Waters was born in New York City on 26 December 1896. He had two brothers and two sisters. He lived in Bushwick, Brooklyn and attended New York City Public Schools. He was educated at PS 44 at Throop Avenue and Madison Street in Brooklyn.

In his early career Waters penned the vaudeville sketches Their Chance (1917) and Chapter 46, Page 266 (1919) In 1920 Photoplay Magazine acknowledged his success as a young playwright at the age of 23. He worked as a display manager for Avedon, and contributed an article on display design for retail stores that was published in Advertising and Selling magazine in 1921. In 1922 two of his plays were allegedly accepted for production by A. H. Woods, Clay and A Match for Three. His play Just a Dash of Arsenic was staged in Cleveland in 1927 with a cast that included Roland Bottomley and Ernita Lascelles. With Katherine Haviland Taylor he co-authored the play The Taming of the Crew (1928). He had previously adapted Taylor's short story "Mrs. Upton Has Her Fling" into the play Good Gracious, Mother (1922).

Waters co-wrote the play Little Orchid Annie with Charles Beahan. It was given its premiere on April 4, 1929 at the Mayan Theater in Los Angeles with Ruth Taylor in the title role. It was subsequently staged on Broadway at the Eltinge 42nd Street Theatre in 1930. His play The Ghost Parade premiered on Broadway at the Lyric Theatre on October 28, 1929. His play Matrimonial Madness premiered at a theatre in Eerie, Pennsylvania in 1930. Other plays penned by Waters included Oh Woman, Woman, She Cried for the Moon, Crackers in Bed, and Ballyhoo.

Waters died on 13 November 1964 at St. Vincent's Hospital in New York City at the age of 67. He had entered the hospital three weeks earlier after sustaining injuries from a fall at his home at 258 West 22d Street.
