= Phoebe Foster =

American actress

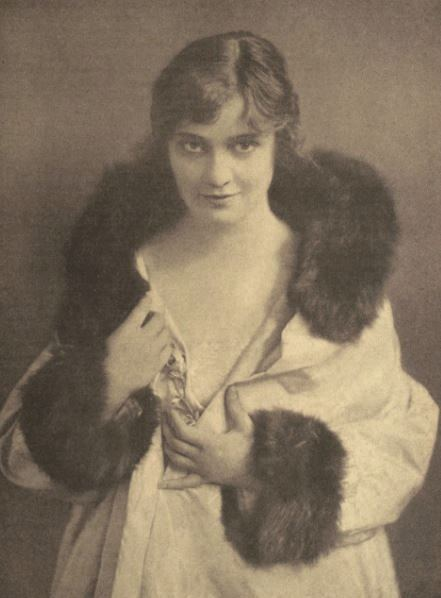
- Foster in 1919
- Born: Angeline Egar; July 9, 1896; Center Harbor, New Hampshire, U.S.
- Died: June 1975 (aged 78); Boston, Massachusetts, U.S.
- Occupation: Actress
- Years active: 1914–1939
- Spouse: Harold LeRoy Whitney (m. 1927; div. 1943)

Phoebe Foster (born Angeline Egar; July 9, 1896 – June 1975) was an American theater and film actress.

== Career ==
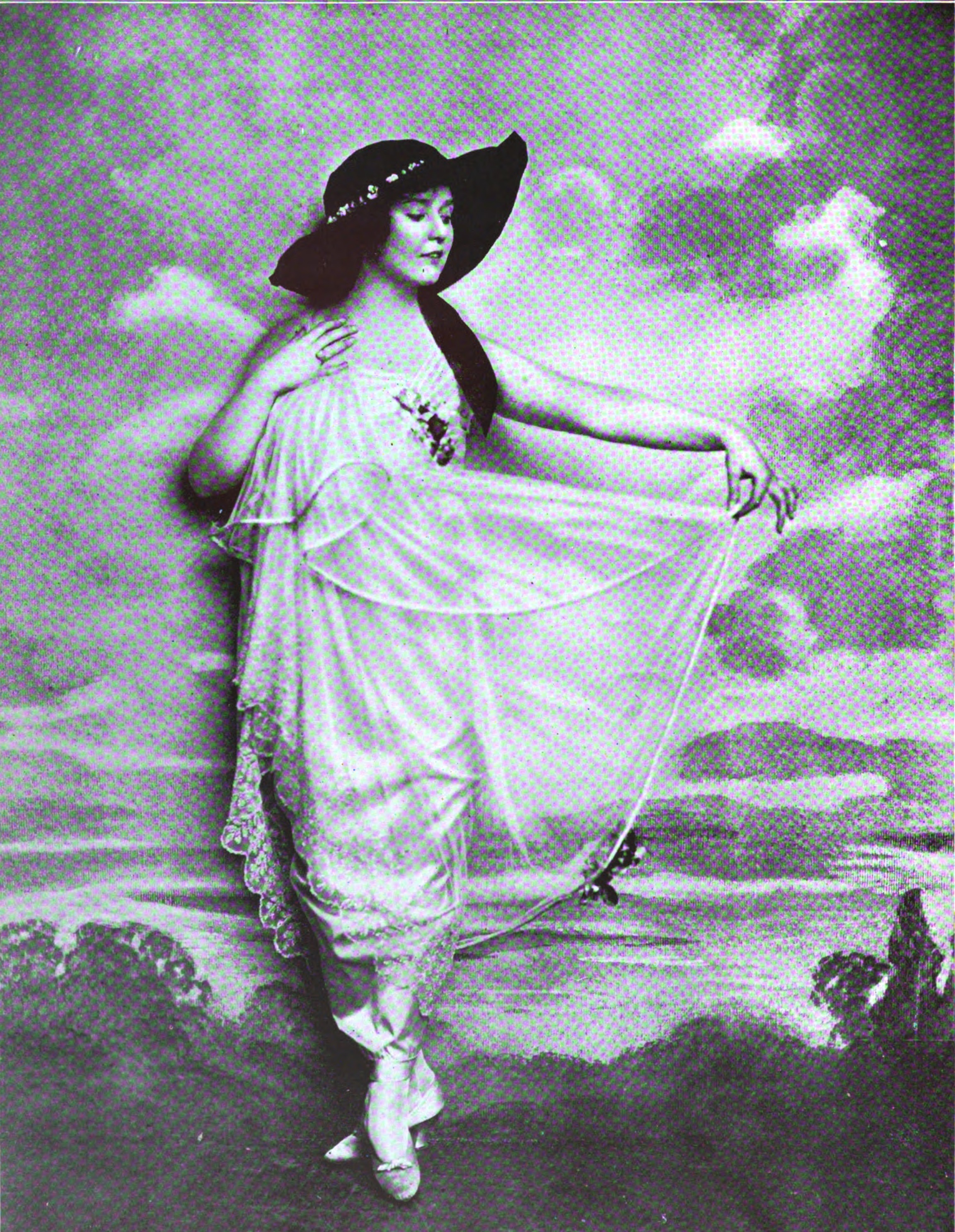
Portrait of Foster in Vanity Fair (March 1916)

Foster studied at the American Academy of Dramatic Arts. She began appearing on Broadway in 1914, starting with a production of Roi Cooper Megrue's Under Cover. Her subsequent Broadway appearances included The Cinderella Man (1916), Three's a Crowd (1919), Captain Applejack (1921), The Jazz Singer (1925), and Topaze (1930).

After appearing in a couple of short films, in 1931 she made her feature film debut in George Cukor's Tarnished Lady alongside Tallulah Bankhead. That same year she also appeared in Edmund Goulding's The Night Angel with Nancy Carroll and Fredric March. In 1933, she was in the comedies Our Betters and Dinner at Eight, both directed by Cukor. Two years later she appeared in the Tolstoy adaptation Anna Karenina with Greta Garbo. In 1935 she also returned to Broadway for the brief run of Living Dangerously. In 1936 she had her first stage appearance in London, starring in a production of Night of January 16th. Foster's last movie was The Gorgeous Hussy in 1936. Her final Broadway production was American Landscape (1938).

== Personal life ==
Foster was born in 1896 as Angeline Egar (possibly Eager) (Note: Sources differ as to whether the family name was spelled 'Egar' or 'Eager'.) in Center Harbor, New Hampshire. She was the daughter of Arthur and Emily Egar.

Foster married millionaire Harold LeRoy Whitney, heir to an ironworks fortune, on September 12, 1927. Whitney had divorced his previous wife just days before. The couple kept the marriage secret for several days before the press discovered it. They filed for divorce in 1943. Phoebe Foster died in 1975 in Boston, Massachusetts.

== Credits ==
=== Broadway ===
- 1914: Under Cover
- 1915: Under Fire
- 1915: Back Home
- 1916: The Cinderella Man
- 1917: The Lassoo
- 1917: The Gipsy Trail
- 1918: By Pigeon Post
- 1919: First is Last
- 1919: Three's a Crowd
- 1921: Toto
- 1921: Captain Applejack
- 1924: Garden of Weeds
- 1924: High Stakes
- 1925: The Jazz Singer
- 1926: The Donovan Affair
- 1927: Interference
- 1929: Scotland Yard
- 1929: The Amorous Antic
- 1930: Topaze
- 1930: That's the Woman
- 1930: The Truth Game
- 1931: Cynara
- 1935: Living Dangerously
- 1938: Bachelor Born
- 1938: American Landscape

=== Film ===
- 1919: An Honorable Cad (Short)
- 1930: Grounds for Murder (Short)
- 1931: Tarnished Lady as Germaine Prentiss
- 1931: The Night Angel as Theresa Masar
- 1933: Our Betters as Princess
- 1933: Scarlet River as Phoebe Foster (uncredited)
- 1933: Dinner at Eight as Miss Alden
- 1935: Anna Karenina as Dolly
- 1935: O'Shaughnessy's Boy as Girl on Camel in Parade (uncredited)
- 1936: The White Angel as Mrs. Elizabeth Herbert
- 1936: The Gorgeous Hussy as Emily Donaldson (uncredited)
