= Stolen Heaven =

Stolen Heaven may refer to:

- Stolen Heaven (1931 film), an American Pre-Code drama film
- Stolen Heaven (1938 film), an American drama film
- Stolen Heaven (1974 film), an Italian-German drama film
