= Mayan Theater =

Venue in Los Angeles, California, US

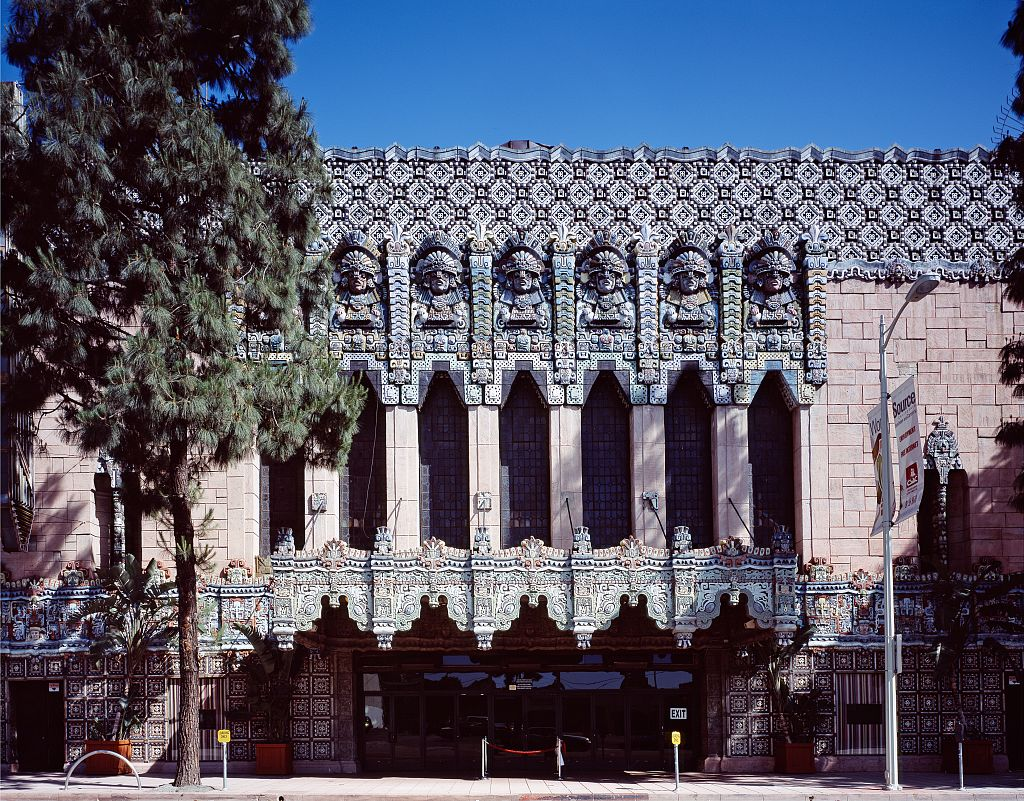
- Exterior of venue (c. 2010)
- Interactive map of Mayan Theater
- Address: 1038 South Hill Street; Los Angeles, CA 90015-1614
- Location: Downtown Los Angeles
- Coordinates: 34.041028°N 118.259005°W
- Capacity: 1,700
- Current use: Nightclub

Construction
- Opened: August 15, 1927
- Architect: Stiles O. Clements

Website
- Official website

Los Angeles Historic-Cultural Monument
- Reference no.: 460

The Mayan Theater in Los Angeles, California, is a landmark former movie palace and former nightclub and music venue.

== History ==
The Mayan Theater opened in August 1927 as a performance arts theater specializing in musical comedy. Hadley Waters and Charles Beahan's Little Orchid Annie was given its world premiere at the theater on April 4, 1929 with Ruth Taylor in the title role.

Leon Hefflin Sr. rented out the Mayan Theater downtown Los Angeles to produce the Sweet N' Hot, "Greatest Negro All Star Musical to Hit Coast." His business partner was Curtis Mosby, and the featured performer was Dorothy Dandridge. The show had a run of eleven weeks and was reported as going to New York. It closed to rave reviews and was covered by 20 different newspapers all over the country.

From 1971 to 1989, the theater was owned by pornographic filmmaker Carlos Tobalina. In the 1980s, the theater showed pornographic films.

The theater has been a location in many films, including Playing by Heart, Sally of the Scandals, The Bodyguard, Save the Tiger, Unlawful Entry, Rock 'n' Roll High School, and A Night at the Roxbury. The Mayan was the filming location of the music video for The Pointer Sisters hit Neutron Dance. It was also featured in the eighth episode of the first season of GLOW, and a Hangin' Tough concert performed by New Kids on the Block filmed on June 5th, 1989 as "Hangin Tough Live" on VHS.

In 1990, the Mayan Theater, with most of its lavish ornament intact, became a nightclub and music venue. It is designated as a Historic Cultural Monument.

In 2022, Daft Punk also streamed a video recording of a show at the Mayan Theater in Los Angeles from their 1997 Daftendirektour.

On July 14, 2025, it was announced that the current tenant will permanently close by the end of September of 2025 after serving 35 years as a nightclub.

In December 2025, Mike Joher, owner of the HEAT Ultra Lounge in Anaheim, California, announced that with his purchase of the Mayan, he has plans to reopen the historic theatre as a nightclub and music venue, in January 2026.

== Architecture and design ==
Designed by Stiles O. Clements of Morgan, Walls & Clements, the façade of the Mayan Theater includes stylized pre-Columbian patterns and figures designed by sculptor Francisco Cornejo. This was his major work.

The Mayan Theater is a prototypical example of the many ornate exotic revival-style theaters of the late 1920s, Mayan Revival in this case. The well-preserved lobby is called "The Hall of Feathered Serpents," the auditorium includes a chandelier based on the Aztec calendar stone, and the original fire curtain included images of Mayan jungles and temples.

== Gallery ==
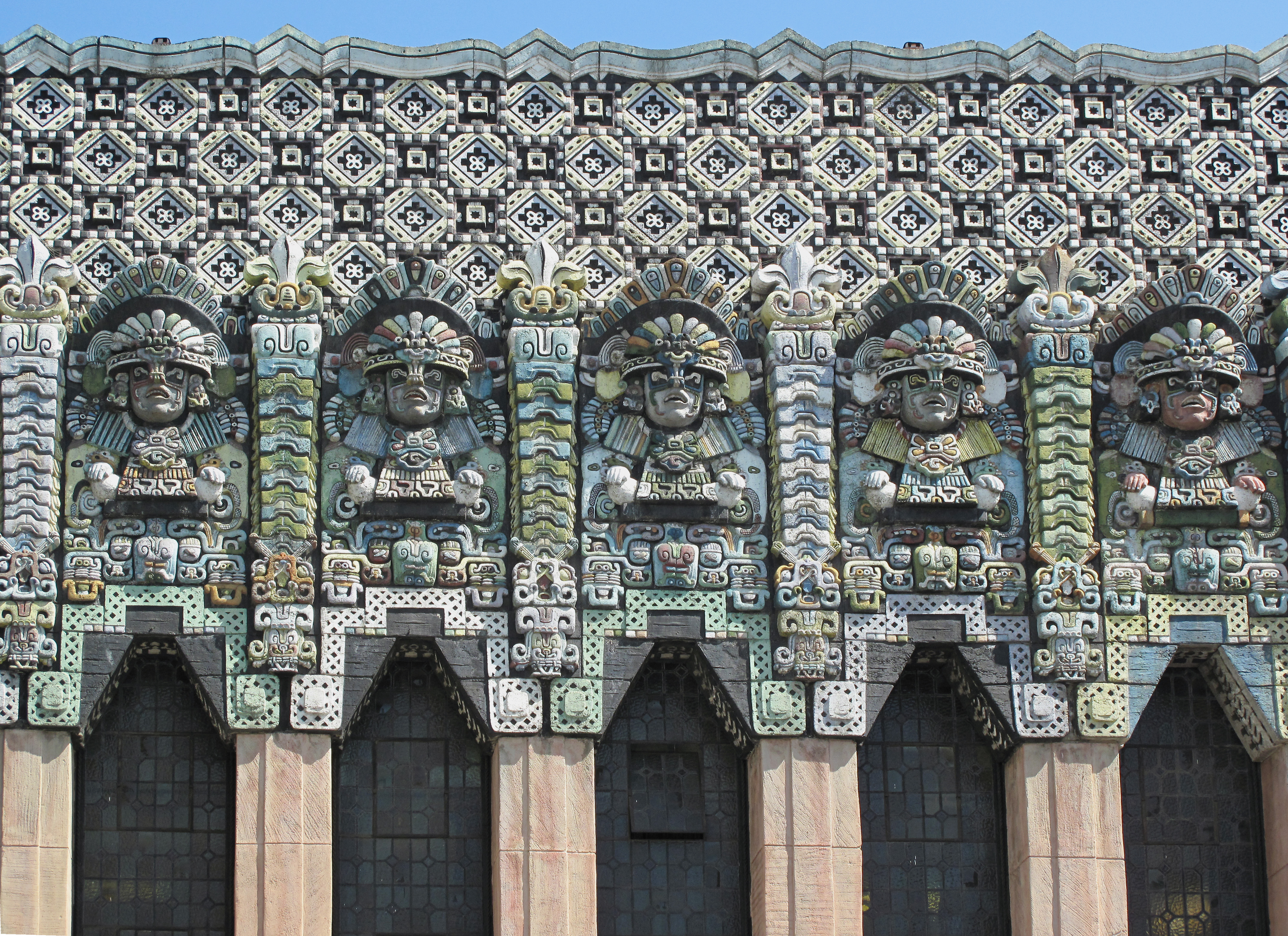
Detail of façade, 2012

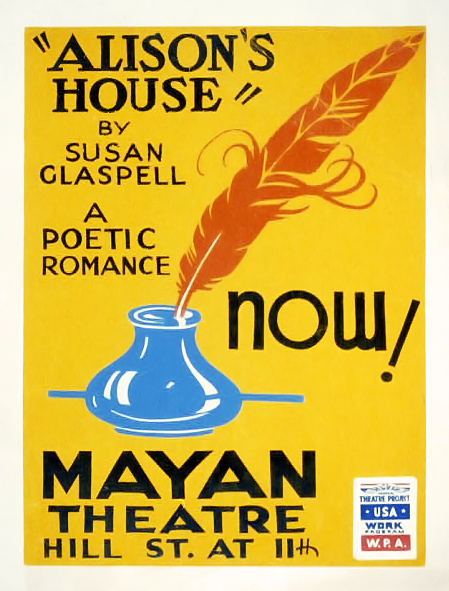
Theater poster, 1938

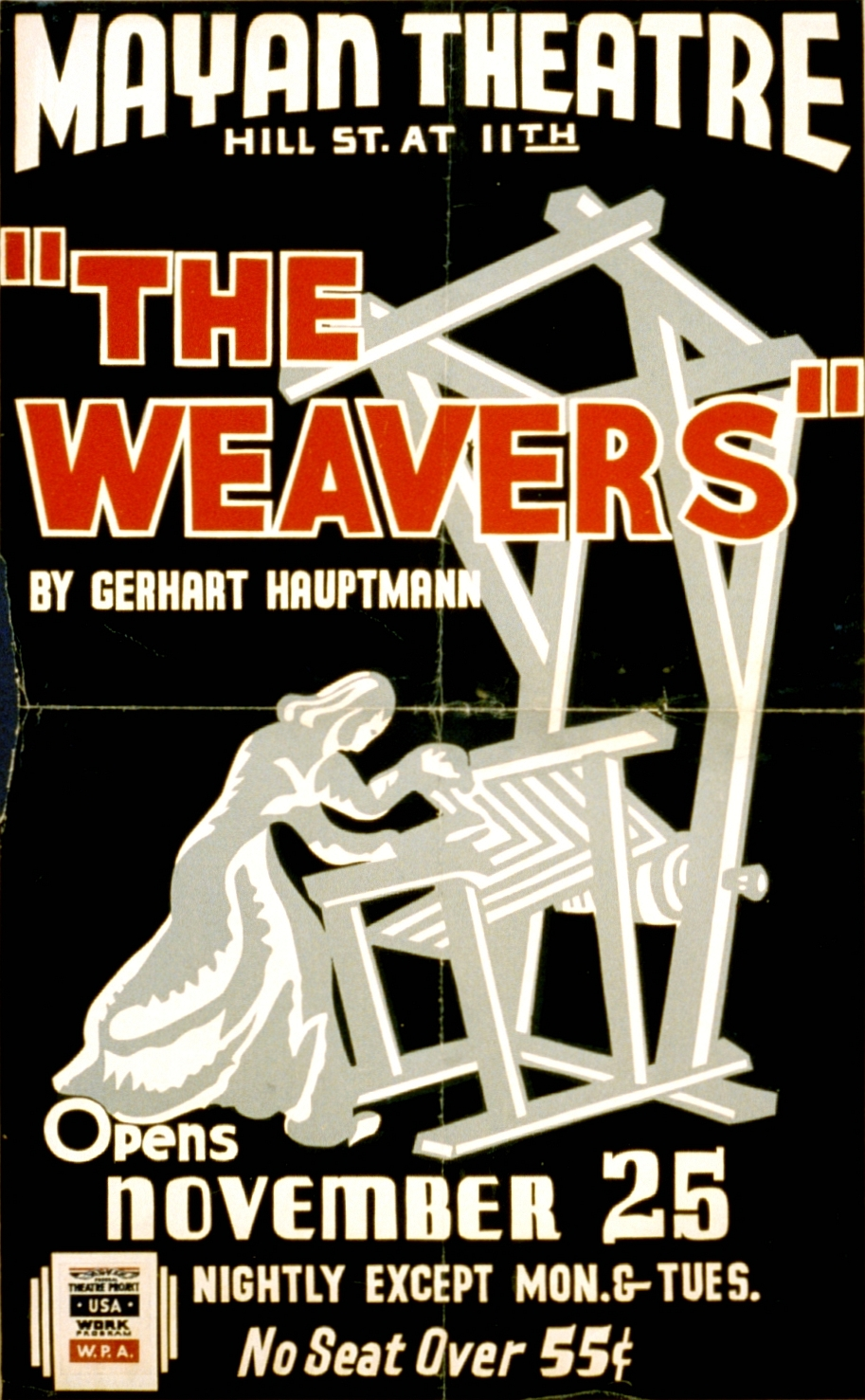
Theater poster, 1937

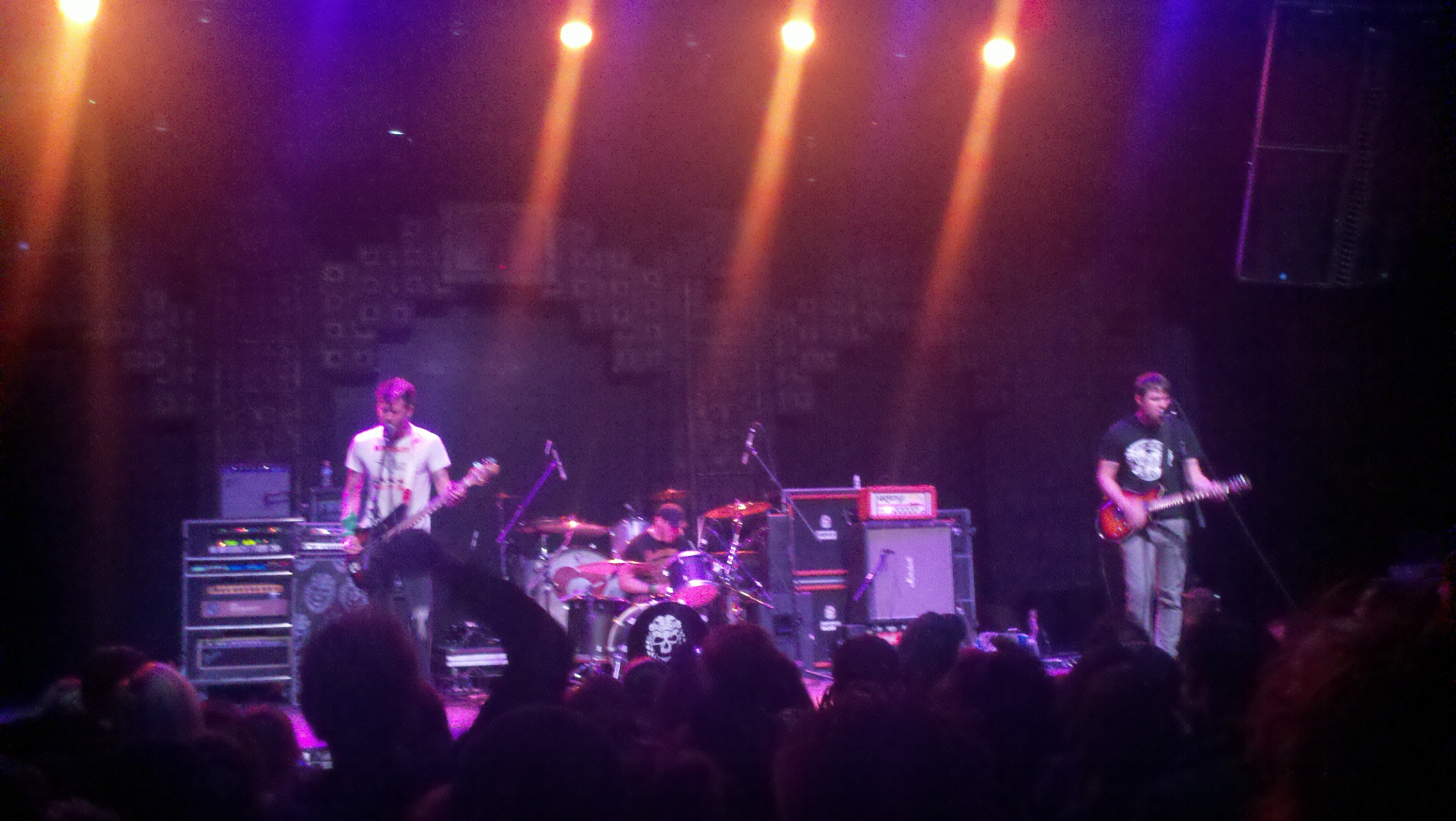
Mayan stage, 2011

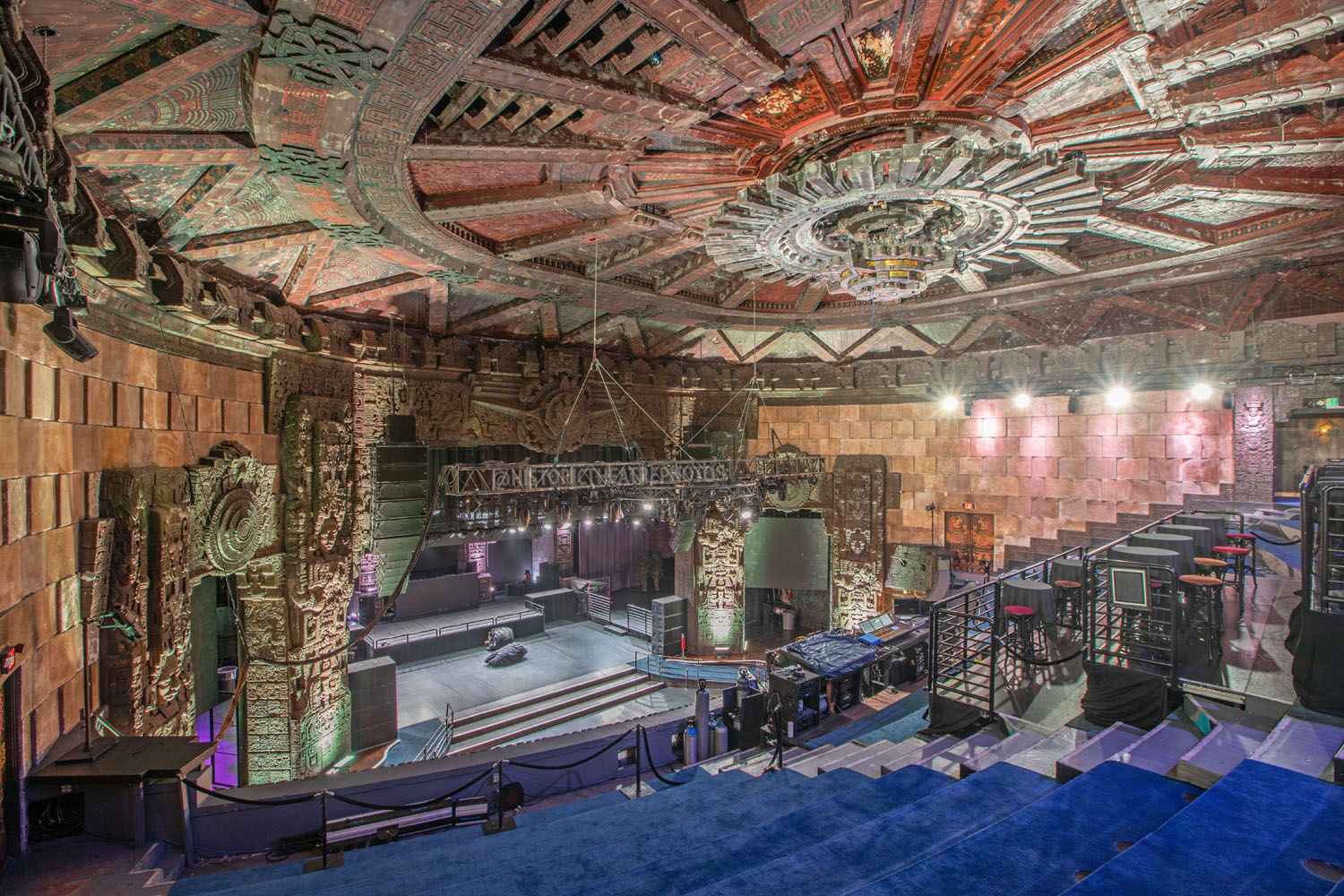
Auditorium from Balcony Left, 2020

Mayan Theatre, Los Angeles (Historic Theatre Photography)

== See also ==
- List of Los Angeles Historic-Cultural Monuments in Downtown Los Angeles
- Mayan Revival architecture-related topics
