= Sweet Surrender (film) =

1935 film by Monte Brice

- Directed by: Monte Brice
- Screenplay by: Charles Beahan; John V.A. Weaver
- Story by: Herbert Fields
- Produced by: Monte Brice; William Rowland
- Starring: Frank Parker; Tamara; Helen Lynd; Russ Brown; Arthur Pierson; Otis Sheridan
- Cinematography: William Miller
- Edited by: Leo Zochling
- Music by: Rosario Bourdon
- Production company: Broadway Productions
- Distributed by: Universal Pictures
- Release date: December 1, 1935
- Running time: 85 minutes
- Country: United States
- Language: English

Sweet Surrender is a 1935 American musical film directed by Monte Brice, written by Charles Beahan and John V.A. Weaver, and starring Frank Parker, Tamara, Helen Lynd, Russ Brown, Arthur Pierson and Otis Sheridan. It was released on December 1, 1935, by Universal Pictures.

== Cast ==
- Frank Parker as Danny O'Day
- Tamara as Delphine Marshall / Maizie Marshall
- Helen Lynd as Dot Frost
- Russ Brown as Jerry Burke
- Arthur Pierson as Nick Harrington
- Otis Sheridan as James P. Hargrave
- Jules Epailly as Rozan
- William Adams as Edgar F. Evans
- Alois Havrilla as Alois Havrilla
- Abe Lyman as Abe Lyman
- Jack Dempsey as Jack Dempsey
- Frank S. Moreno as Antonio Grezato
- James Spottswood as Horace Allen
- Leona Powers as Mrs. Horace Allen
- Lee Timmons as Larry Forbes
- Jack Whitney as featured dancer
- Grace Peterson as featured dancer
