= The Night Angel =

1931 film

- Theatrical release poster
- Directed by: Edmund Goulding
- Screenplay by: Edmund Goulding
- Starring: Nancy Carroll; Fredric March; Phoebe Foster; Alison Skipworth; Alan Hale, Sr. Hubert Druce; Katherine Emmet
- Cinematography: William O. Steiner
- Edited by: Emma Hill
- Production company: Paramount Pictures
- Distributed by: Paramount Pictures
- Release date: July 18, 1931
- Running time: 86 minutes
- Country: United States
- Language: English

The Night Angel is a 1931 American pre-Code drama film written and directed by Edmund Goulding. The film stars Nancy Carroll, Fredric March, Phoebe Foster, Alison Skipworth and Alan Hale, Sr. The film was released on July 18, 1931, by Paramount Pictures.

== Plot ==
Sources from IMDb

In Prague, Czechoslovakia, Countess Von Martini's tavern is overrun by police and she is arrested for theft. City attorney Rudek Berkem is successful in his prosecution of her, and she is sentenced to two years in prison, while her beautiful daughter Yula is to be sent to a reformatory. Rudek's mother intervenes and arranges for Yula to go to a training school for nurses, despite Yula's resistance. Rudek visits Yula at the hospital and falls in love with her, but she knows their class difference and maintains a distance. After the Countess is paroled, Yula returns to the tavern, and Rudek seeks her out, despite his father's warning "Touch pitch and you will be marked with pitch."

Rudek's visit to Yula proves his love for her, but she sends him back to his fiancée, Theresa Masar, after realizing the impossibility of their union. Rudek's attentions inspire the jealousy of Biezl, the tavern's strongman. When Rudek comes for another visit, Biezl puts a sleeping potion in his drink and places him on a public statue in the middle of the night to ruin his reputation. Yula retrieves Rudek and lets him sleep off the drug in her room. The next morning Rudek prepares to leave but promises to return for her in the afternoon, when he will take her away permanently from the tavern. Just as he is leaving, Biezl goes up to Yula's room and warns her that he will kill Rudek. Yula slaps him and he knocks her unconscious. Rudek returns and struggles with Biezl. Yula revives and tries to help, but Biezl pins her as well, and Rudek kills him with a knife. Rudek is tried for murder, but Yula takes the stand and swears that he killed Biezl in self-defense. Rudek is found innocent, and although Yula leaves so that he can marry his fiancée, Theresa recognizes their true love and gives him up. Yula and Rudek are finally united.

== Cast ==
- Nancy Carroll as Yula Martini
- Fredric March as Rudek Berken
- Phoebe Foster as Theresa Masar
- Alison Skipworth as Countess von Martini
- Alan Hale, Sr. as Biezel
- Hubert Druce as Vincent
- Katherine Emmet as Mrs. Berken
- Otis Sheridan as Schmidt
- E. Lewis Waller as Kafka
- Clarence Derwent as Rosenbach
- Charles Howard as Clown
- Doris Rankin as Matron
- Francine Dowd as Mitzi
- Cora Witherspoon as Head Nurse
- Francis Pierlot as Jan
