= After the Dance (film) =

1935 American drama film directed by Leo Bulgakov

- Directed by: Leo Bulgakov
- Written by: Harold Shumate; Harrison Jacobs; Bruce Manning
- Starring: Nancy Carroll; George Murphy; Thelma Todd
- Cinematography: Joseph H. August
- Edited by: Otto Meyer
- Production company: Columbia Pictures
- Distributed by: Columbia Pictures
- Release date: July 26, 1935
- Running time: 60 minutes
- Country: United States
- Language: English

After the Dance is a 1935 American Proto-Noir, crime romance drama film melodrama directed by Leo Bulgakov and starring Nancy Carroll, George Murphy and Thelma Todd.

== Cast ==
- Nancy Carroll as Anne Taylor
- George Murphy as Jerry Davis
- Thelma Todd as Mabel Kane
- Jack La Rue as Mitch
- Arthur Hohl as Louie
- Wyrley Birch as Warden
- Thurston Hall as District Attorney
- Victor Kilian as Kennedy
- Robert Middlemass as King
- George McKay as Danny
- Virginia Sale as Edna

== Bibliography ==
- Paul L. Nemcek. The films of Nancy Carroll. 1969.
