= Tarnished Lady =

1931 film

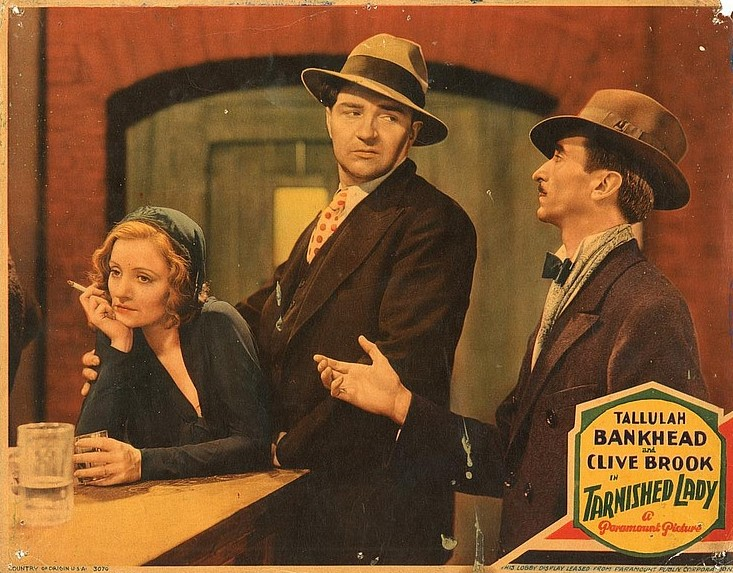
- Lobby card
- Directed by: George Cukor
- Written by: Donald Ogden Stewart
- Produced by: Walter Wanger
- Starring: Tallulah Bankhead; Clive Brook
- Cinematography: Larry Williams
- Edited by: Barney Rogan
- Music by: Vernon Duke
- Distributed by: Paramount Pictures
- Release date: May 2, 1931
- Running time: 83 minutes
- Country: United States
- Language: English

Tarnished Lady is a 1931 American pre-Code drama film directed by George Cukor and starring Tallulah Bankhead and Clive Brook. The screenplay by Donald Ogden Stewart is based on his short story, A Story of a New York Lady.

== Plot ==
Tallulah Bankhead in Tarnished Lady

Nancy Courtney, a once wealthy socialite, has had to struggle to maintain a facade of prosperity ever since her father's death. Although she loves writer DeWitt Taylor, who is indifferent to amassing a fortune, her mother urges her to marry stockbroker Norman Cravath instead. Nancy acquiesces to her mother's wishes but, despite the fact her new husband does everything he can to please her, she is miserable in her marriage.

Meanwhile, DeWitt has begun romancing Norman's former girl friend Germaine Prentiss, Nancy's long-time rival. She realizes DeWitt's relationship with Germaine is changing him into a social climber. Unaware Norman's firm has just been barred from the stock market and he is facing financial ruin, Nancy tells her husband she is leaving him. She learns of Norman's bankruptcy in the newspaper and, together with her friend Ben Sterner, she goes to a speakeasy where she proceeds to get drunk. She and Ben bring some of the bar patrons to his home, where they encounter Norman, who is waiting there to discuss a business transaction with Ben. Seeing his wife in such a disreputable state, he tells her he never wants to see her again.

Nancy tries to live on her own but, lacking any skills, she is unable to find employment and becomes destitute. When she discovers she is pregnant, Ben offers her a place to live and, after the birth of her child, he hires her to work in his department store. Norman and Germaine come in to purchase a fur coat, and Norman is stunned to find Nancy in a menial position. Germaine tries to warn Nancy away, but realizing her husband still loves her, Nancy asks him for another chance. Germaine bows out and leaves Norman with his forgiven wife and infant son.

== Cast ==
- Tallulah Bankhead as Nancy Courtney
- Clive Brook as Norman Cravath
- Phoebe Foster as Germaine Prentiss
- Alexander Kirkland as DeWitt Taylor
- Osgood Perkins as Ben Sterner
- Elizabeth Patterson as Mrs. Courtney
- Beatrice Ames as Minor Role (uncredited)
- Eric Blore as Jewelry Counter Clerk (uncredited)
- Berton Churchill as Stock Speculator (uncredited)
- Edward Gargan as Al, a Man in Bar (uncredited)
- Dewey Robinson as Tony the Waiter (uncredited)
- Cora Witherspoon as Saleslady (uncredited)

== Critical reception ==
Mordaunt Hall of The New York Times observed, "Miss Bankhead acquits herself with considerable distinction, but the vehicle to which she lends her talent is no masterpiece. In fact, only in a few spots is the author's fine hand discernible."

Variety called it a "weepy and ragged melodrama [that] has little outside its cast to be recommended . . . Cast, as a whole, deports in a manner suggesting they were under orders to give way before Bankhead. Clive Brook suffers the most. Ordinarily a fine actor, he slumps here in trying to get over some of the silly dialog."

Donald Ogden Stewart, who wrote the script, said the film "laid an awful egg. I’m not ashamed of it at all; but it just didn’t do Tallulah any good, and it wasn’t successful at all. But I’d gotten to know George Cukor through that and liked him and respected him."
