= Francisco Cornejo =

Mexican painter and sculptor (1892-1963)

- Born: 1892; La Paz, Baja California Sur
- Died: 1963 (aged 70–71); Mexico
- Education: Academy of San Carlos
- Known for: Painting, sculpture
- Notable work: Mayan Theater

Francisco Cornejo (1892 in La Paz, Baja California Sur – 1963) was a Mexican painter and sculptor. His work is informed by Mayan, Aztec and Pre-Columbian art and culture.

== Education ==
Until 1911, Cornejo studied at Academy of San Carlos in Mexico City alongside artist Diego Rivera.

== Career ==
In 1911, Cornejo moved to Los Angeles, where he taught San Franciscan teachers in ancient American art.

Cornejo exhibited in Mexico City, at Stanford University, at the California School of Fine Arts, and in Los Angeles.

Around 1920, Cornejo worked on Ted Shawn's "Toltec Ballet: Xotchil" contributing to the elaborate sets, costumes, and overall storyline through his extensive knowledge of the Toltec legend of Xotchil.

One of his most famous works are the interiors and façade decoration in the Mayan Theater in Los Angeles, a theater built in 1927 under architect Stiles O. Clements, designed in the art deco mode known as Mayan Revival architecture. Cornejo’s knowledge of Mayan, Toltec, and Aztec culture informed the design.

In the 1930s, he returned to his home country, where he lived and worked until his death in 1963.
