= Christian J. Frank =

American actor

- Born: March 13, 1890
- Died: December 10, 1967 (aged 77)
- Occupation: Film actor
- Years active: 1920–1948

Christian Julius Frank (March 13, 1890 – December 10, 1967) was an American actor. He appeared in 65 films between 1920 and 1948, mostly in uncredited roles. His most notable role was that of an irascible cop in the Laurel and Hardy short You're Darn Tootin' (1928).

He was born in New York City and died in Los Angeles, California.

== Partial filmography ==
- Thunderbolt Jack (1920)
- Wild Honey (1922)
- The Guttersnipe (1922)
- The Love Bandit (1924)
- Love and Glory (1924)
- Manhattan Madness (1925)
- The Ancient Highway (1925)
- Black Cyclone (1925)
- Forlorn River (1926)
- The Lady of the Harem (1926)
- Arizona Bound (1927)
- His First Flame (1927)
- Nevada (1927)
- The Secret Hour (1928)
- Chicago After Midnight (1928)
- You're Darn Tootin' (1928)
- Easy Come, Easy Go (1928)
- The Cavalier (1928)
- Sunset Pass (1929)
- The Vagabond King (1930)
- Under Montana Skies (1930)
- The Hard Hombre (1931)
- My Pal, the King (1932)
- Embarrassing Moments (1934)
- Winds of the Wasteland (1936)
