= Otis Sheridan =

American character actor (c.1872–1961)

Otis C. Sheridan (c. 1872 – 20 September 1961) was an American character actor who had a five decade long career on the stage from the 1890s into the early 1940s. He made his Broadway debut in 1901 as Ludwig Dollar in Thomas Q. Seabrooke's revival of the musical The Rounders. He appeared in several more Broadway musicals and plays into the late 1930s, and was also active in regional theatre until his retirement from the stage in 1941. In addition to a career in the theater, he appeared in the films The Night Angel (1931) and Sweet Surrender (1935).

== Life and career ==
Born in Philadelphia, Sheridan began his career as an actor in the 1890s. He starred in the national tour of Ludwig Engländer's musical The Rounders; beginning with performances at the Grand Opera House in Brooklyn in October 1900. Produced by and starring the comedian Thomas Q. Seabrooke, The Rounders was a loosely plotted backstage musical in the vein of a vaudeville variety show, and Sheridan drew praise from critics for his portrayal of the chief coronetist, Ludwig Dollar, in the production. The national tour played Broadway's Casino Theatre in 1901, and Sheridan was still with the production when it reached the Court Theatre in Buffalo, New York in January 1902.

In 1903, Sheridan was a member of a touring theatre troupe led by actress Minnie Tittell Brune which was touring a production of Francis Marion Crawford's Unorna; a play written for Brune. He returned to Broadway in 1906; appearing first at the Lew M. Fields Theatre and later the Lyric Theatre in Clara Lipman's play Julie Bonbon. The following year he returned to the Casino Theatre to create the character role of Lieutenant Wilhelm Klopstock in the premiere of another Engländer musical, The White Hen, which was a starring vehicle for the actor Louis Mann. He remained with the production when it went on national tour after it left Broadway.

Sheridan's other Broadway credits include Novotny in Blossom Time (original 1921 production, and both the 1923 and 1924 revivals); the Property Man in Leslie Howard's Out of a Blue Sky (1930), Strup in Robert Emmet Sherwood's Reunion in Vienna (1931), Mr. Herbert Selton in Henry R. Misrock's Bright Honor (1936), and Mr. Seamon in Irving Gaumont and Jack Sobell's 30 Days Hath September (1938). He retired from performing in 1941 due to illness.

In addition to his work in theatre, Sheridan portrayed Schmidt in the 1931 film The Night Angel, and James P. Hargrave in the 1935 film Sweet Surrender.

Sheridan died on September 20, 1961, aged 89, in Fort Lauderdale, Florida.
