= Cecilia of the Pink Roses =

1918 film by Julius Steger

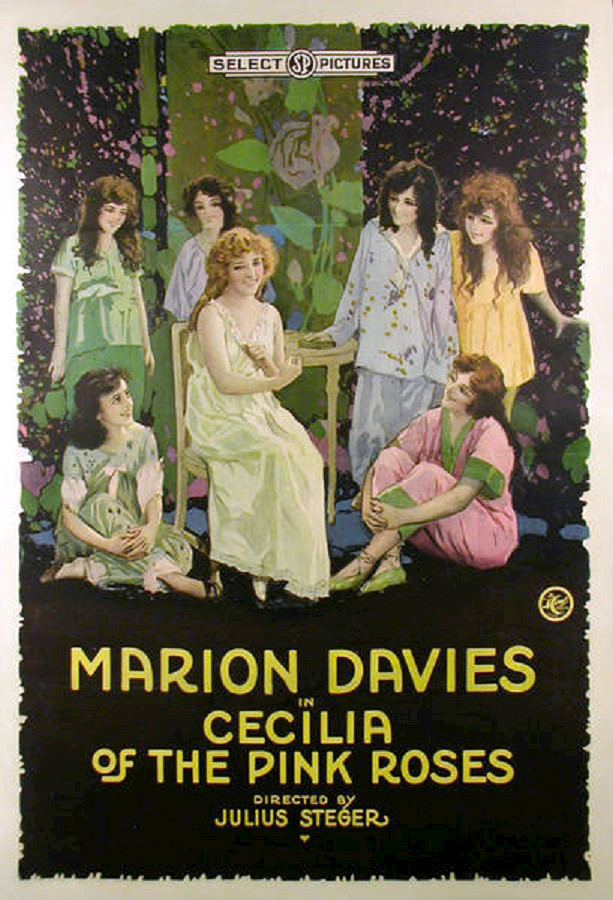
- Film poster
- Directed by: Julius Steger
- Written by: S.M. Weller (scenario)
- Based on: Cecilia of the Pink Roses by Katharine Haviland Taylor
- Produced by: Marion Davies
- Starring: Marion Davies
- Production company: Marion Davies Film Corporation
- Distributed by: Select Pictures
- Release date: June 2, 1918
- Running time: 6 reels
- Country: United States
- Language: Silent (English intertitles)

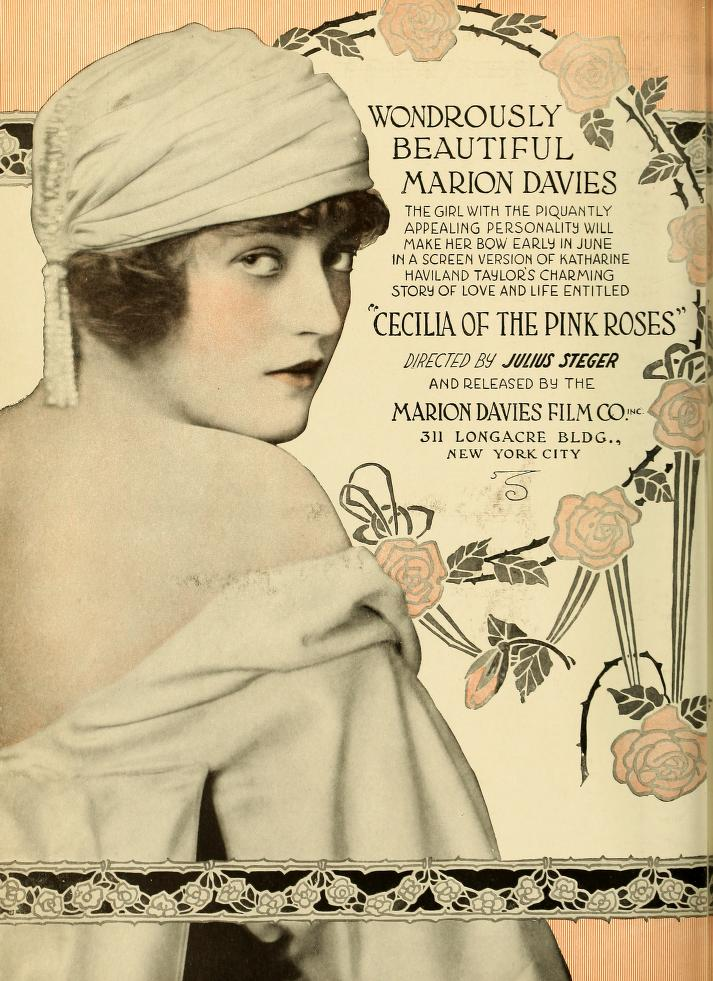
Advertisement for film.

Cecilia of the Pink Roses is a lost 1918 American silent drama film directed by Julius Steger and starring and produced by Marion Davies in her second feature film. It was distributed by Select Pictures. It was based on the novel by Katherine Haviland Taylor.

== Plot ==
As described in a film magazine, Cecilia's parents live very humbly in a tenement. The father is an inventive brick layer but can scarcely pay the expenses incident for the illness of the dying mother Mary (Kershaw). After her death all the cares fall on "Celie" (Davies), who tries to mother the brother and care for her father. Father McGowan (Sullivan), priest of the parish, is interested in the family and helps the father to sell an invention to his advantage. Celie is sent to a fashionable school where her crude manners make her unpopular. She meets Harry Twombly (Benham), who becomes interested in her. Her conduct is misunderstood and she becomes unhappy. She goes abroad and develops into a woman of fine ideals and a beautiful understanding of life. She sees in her father the man he wants to be, but is considerably worried about her brother, who drinks heavily. She meets Twombly again, and he wants to marry her, but she insists that he visit her home and meet her people. There she is greatly embarrassed by her brother's behavior and decides to refuse Twombly, but a miserable escapade of her brother's throws him into the hands of blackmailers where Twombly saves him. She is persuaded that happiness can only be found in their marriage and at last consents.

== Cast ==
- Marion Davies as Cecilia
- Harry Benham as Harry Twombly
- Edward O'Connor as Jeremiah Madden
- Willette Kershaw as Mary, Jeremiah's wife
- Charles Jackson as Johnny as a boy (*?Charles R. Jackson)
- George Le Guere as Johnny as a young man
- Danny Sullivan as Father McGowan (credited as Daniel J. Sullivan)
- John Charles as George Dickson
- Eva Campbell as Dolly Vernon
- Joseph Burke as Dr. McNeil

== Production ==
This was the first film collaboration between Marion Davies and William Randolph Hearst and the first film made under the Marion Davies Film Company banner. The Santa Cruz Evening News reported on May 14, 1918, that "[a]fter Runaway Romany, Marion Davies has begun her second movie, Cecilia of the Pink Roses." For the film's premiere, Hearst equipped the theater with electric fans that blew the scent of fresh roses into the audience by propping hundred of roses in front of the fans.

== Reception ==
Like many American films of the time, Cecilia of the Pink Roses was subject to cuts by city and state film censorship boards. For example, the Chicago Board of Censors cut, in Reel 1, the thumbing of a nose and, in Reel 6, the two intertitles "Now sign this" etc. and "Then I will take the law into my own hands".
