= Emma Hill (film editor) =

American film editor

- Occupation: Film editor
- Years active: 1929–1935

Emma Hill was an American film editor active in Hollywood during the late 1920s through the mid-1930s.

== Selected filmography ==
- Convention Girl (1935)
- The Cheat (1931)
- My Sin (1931)
- The Night Angel (1931)
- Stolen Heaven (1931)
- The Big Pond (1930)
- Young Man of Manhattan (1930)
- The Battle of Paris (1929)
