= Easy Come, Easy Go (1928 film) =

1928 film

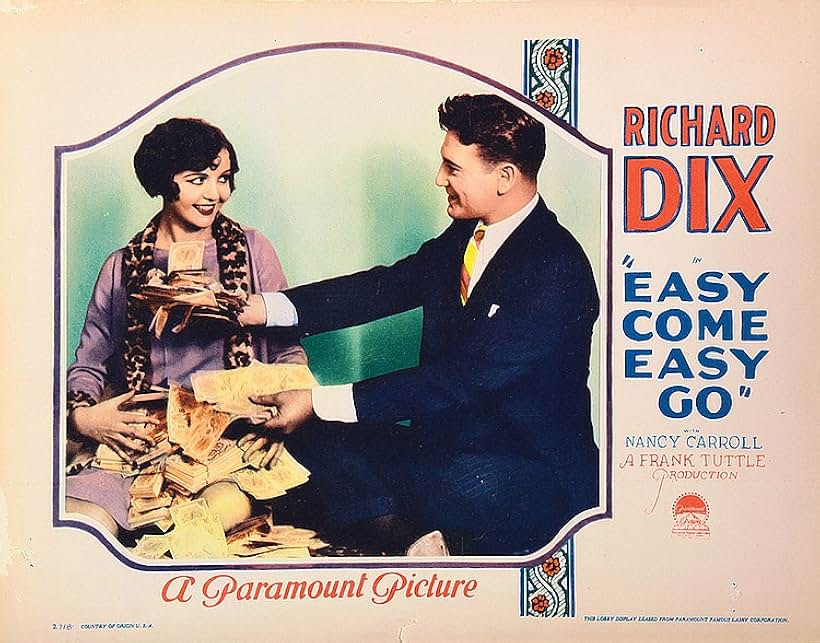
- Directed by: Frank Tuttle
- Screenplay by: Owen Davis; George Marion Jr. Florence Ryerson
- Produced by: Jesse L. Lasky; Adolph Zukor
- Starring: Richard Dix; Nancy Carroll; Charles Sellon; Frank Currier; Arnold Kent; Christian J. Frank
- Cinematography: Edward Cronjager
- Edited by: Otho Lovering
- Production company: Famous Players–Lasky Corporation
- Distributed by: Paramount Pictures
- Release date: April 21, 1928
- Running time: 60 minutes
- Country: United States
- Language: English

Easy Come, Easy Go is a 1928 American comedy silent film directed by Frank Tuttle and written by Owen Davis, George Marion Jr. and Florence Ryerson. The film stars Richard Dix, Nancy Carroll, Charles Sellon, Frank Currier, Arnold Kent and Christian J. Frank. The film was released on April 21, 1928, by Paramount Pictures.

== Cast ==
- Richard Dix as Robert Parker
- Nancy Carroll as Barbara Quayle
- Charles Sellon as Jim Bailey
- Frank Currier as Mr. Quayle
- Arnold Kent as Winthrop
- Christian J. Frank as Detective
- Joseph J. Franz as Detective
- Guy Oliver as Conductor

== Preservation status ==
- The film is now lost.
