= The Philanderer =

Play by George Bernard Shaw

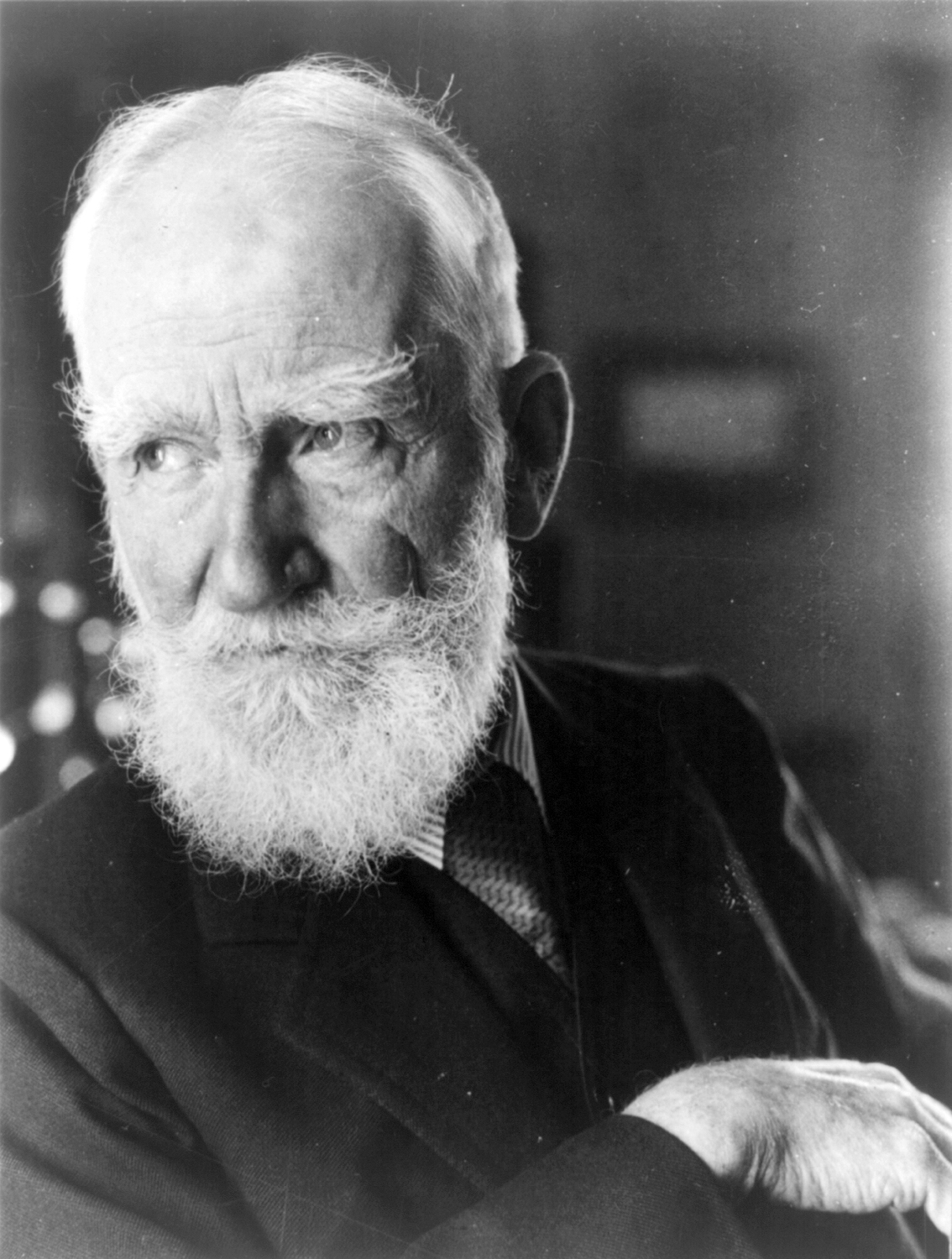
- Original language: English
- Written by: George Bernard Shaw
- Subject: A philandering young man encounters modern women
- Genre: satire
- Setting: A flat in Ashley-gardens; The Ibsen club

Premiere
- Date: 20 February 1905
- Place: Cripplegate Institute, London

The Philanderer is a play by George Bernard Shaw.

It was written in 1893 but the strict British censorship laws at the time meant that it was not produced on stage until 1902.

It is one of the three plays Shaw published as Plays Unpleasant in 1898, alongside Widowers' Houses and Mrs Warren's Profession. The volume was written to raise awareness of social problems and criticize capitalist behaviour. The influence of Naturalist playwrights is evident by Shaw's constant reference to Ibsen in the play. The Naturalist theatre movement was a reaction to Melodrama, the Victorian theatre tradition of the time.

Shaw wrote two endings for this play; the first ending, with divorce as its main theme, was discarded on the advice of a friend, the second ending resulting in a more conventional marriage. It is the latter that is usually performed or published, though the former is the more in keeping with Shaw's tendencies to criticize contemporary society.

== Characters ==
- Leonard Charteris
- Mrs Grace Tranfield
- Julia Craven
- Colonel Daniel Craven, v.c.
- Mr Joseph Cuthbertson
- Sylvia Craven
- Dr Paramore
- The club page

== Plot ==
“A lady and gentleman are kissing in the drawing room of a flat in Ashley Gardens in the Victoria district of London.”

The lady is a young widow, Grace Tranfield, in love with the man, Leonard Charteris, who is the ‘philanderer’ of the title. Grace is shocked and disconcerted to find that Charteris, on his own light‐hearted admission, has been in a similar position with Julia Craven and others. The affair with Julia, in fact, has never been broken off. He maintains that it is not his fault that half the women he speaks to fall in love with him; and he is in full flight of cajolery when Julia Craven herself erupts on to the scene, attacks Grace, and announces her intention of staying until Charteris has given her up.

Charteris gets Grace out of the room and unsuccessfully reminds Julia of her supposedly advanced views on marriage. She changes from belligerence to pleading tears, without effect, and, to the consternation of both, the fathers of Grace and Julia enter together. Colonel Craven is suffering from a liver complaint, and much to Charteris’ impatience "has fully made up his mind not to survive next Easter", just to oblige the doctors. Cuthbertson, Grace’s father, is a dramatic critic and theatrically shocked to discover something of the Charteris‐Grace‐Julia triangle; but Charteris explains it is Grace whom he wants to marry.

The scene changes to the Ibsen Club, of which most of the characters are members. A fashionable physician, Dr. Paramore, says he has made a discovery concerning Col. Craven’s fatal complaint, but horrifies Craven’s younger daughter Sylvia by his practice of vivisection. Craven turns up at Cuthbertson’s invitation, and Charteris outrages both men by admitting he had lied to them last night: the truth is, both young women want to marry him, but he does not want to marry either.

Julia enters the Club with Paramore dancing attendance, and manages to trap Charteris alone. She is, however, forced to retire by Sylvia, who delights Charteris by saying Dr. Paramore is in love with Julia. Charteris attempts to flirt with Grace again but is repulsed, and attention is diverted by the distraught Dr. Paramore who has learnt in the British Medical Journal that his ‘discovery,’ Craven’s liver complaint, is a disease which doesn’t exist. He complains of lack of animals for experiment, and resents Craven’s delight at learning he is not to die. Charteris, to cheer him, suggests that Julia is fascinated by him, but it is Grace who comes in first and retires with the doctor privately. Changing tactics, Charteris points them out to Julia, arousing her jealousy. The result is another quarrel between Julia and Grace, who threatens to have Julia expelled from the Club. Julia hurries after Dr. Paramore, to enlist him as a witness in her favor, and Charteris tries to prevent the others following, in order to give the doctor time to propose to her.

This Paramore does, at his house, and Julia, dubious but flattered, accepts him before the others arrive. Charteris is delighted, and Julia and Grace, reconciled, congratulate each other on having escaped him. Nevertheless, Julia bitterly regrets not being brave enough to kill Charteris.

An alternate, and in fact Shaw's original, ending was preserved in manuscript, though not performed until the 1990s. In it the scene at Paramore's house takes place four years later, after his marriage to Julia, when Paramore has tired of Julia and she of marriage. Paramore has fallen in love with Grace and asks Charteris's advice. Eventually, Craven, Cuthbertson and Julia join them and Cuthbertson is persuaded to suggest a solution - divorce, though difficult to obtain in Victorian England without scandal and deceit, is quite easily obtained in South Dakota. Grace joins them, and after a new row between her and Julia, all is agreed. Julia and Charteris are left alone, she presses him to marry her once she is free, but he refuses on the grounds of being a philanderer and no fit husband, and they agree to return to their former ways.

== In performance ==
The play was intended for Cyril Maude, and it was put into rehearsal at the Haymarket Theatre in the winter of 1897, but was never produced. It was privately performed on 20 February 1905, at the Cripplegate Institute. The first West End performance was on 5 February 1907 at the Royal Court Theatre. Shaw directed the first known Broadway production in 1913-14, which was performed at the Little Theater and featured E. J. Ballantine, Reginald Besant, Reginald Dance, Ernita Lascelles, Mary Lawton, Charles Maude, Muriel Reddall and W. R. Stavely.

The National Theatre performed the play in 1978–79, directed by Christopher Morahan in the Lyttelton Theatre. The cast included Dinsdale Landen as Leonard Charteris, Penelope Wilton as Julia Craven, Polly Adams as Grace Tranfield and John Standing as Dr. Paramore.

The most recent New York City production was a revival by the Pearl Theatre Company in 2012, running from January 10 to February 19. The production was directed by Gus Kaikkonen and featured Bradford Cover as Leonard Charteris, Rachel Botchan as Grace Tranfield, Karron Graves as Julia Craven, Dominic Cuskern as Joseph Cuthbertson, Dan Daily as Colonel Craven, Chris Mixon as Percy Paramore, Shalita Grabnt as Sylvia Craven and Chris Richards as Page Boy/Butler.

A production of this was performed at Shaw's Corner produced and directed by Michael Friend 27–29 June 2014, then at the Memorial Theatre, Broadstairs 31 July – 3 August 2014, as part of their summer rep season.

The Shaw Festival at Niagara-on-the-Lake, Ontario has performed the play a number of times: in 1971, 1980, 1995 and 2007. A new production was performed at the Festival Theatre June 26 – October 12, 2014. The production will be directed by Lisa Peterson and designed by Sue LePage, and the cast will include Michael Ball as Joseph Cutherbertson, Guy Bannerman as Spedding, Kristi Frank as Page, Jeff Meadows as Dr. Paramore, Marla McLean as Mrs. Grace Tranfield, Moya O'Connell as Julia Craven, Gord Rand as Leonard Charteris, Ric Reid as Col. Daniel Craven and Harveen Sandhu as Sylvia Craven.
