= Hot Saturday =

1932 film directed by William A. Seiter

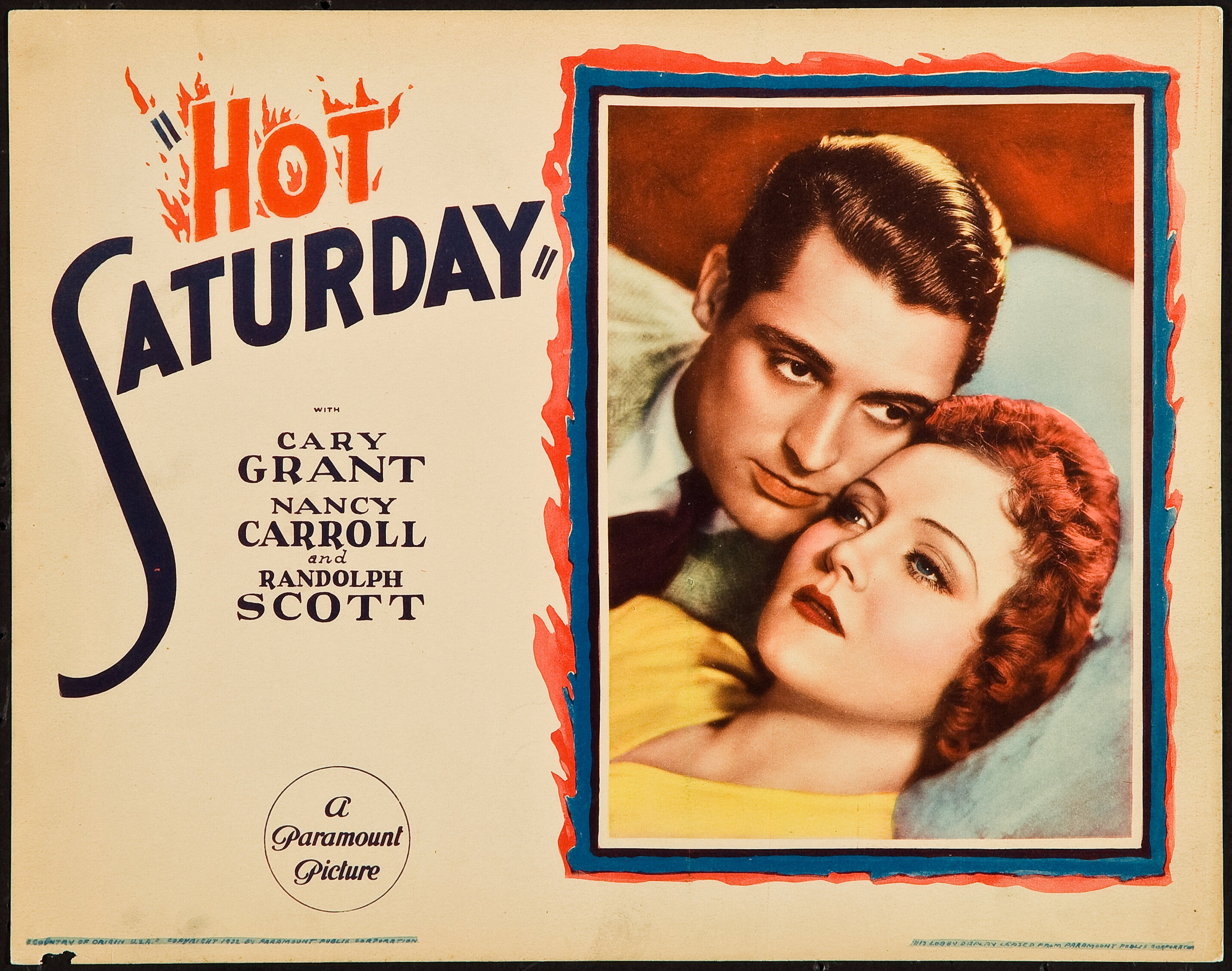
- Lobby card for the film
- Directed by: William A. Seiter
- Screenplay by: Josephine Lovett; Joseph Moncure March; Seton I. Miller
- Based on: Hot Saturday; 1926 novel by Harvey Fergusson
- Produced by: William LeBaron
- Starring: Cary Grant; Nancy Carroll; Randolph Scott
- Cinematography: Arthur L. Todd
- Music by: John Leipold
- Production company: Paramount Pictures
- Distributed by: Paramount Pictures
- Release date: October 28, 1932 (USA)
- Running time: 72 minutes
- Country: United States
- Language: English

Hot Saturday is a 1932 American pre-Code "programmer" drama film directed by William A. Seiter and starring Cary Grant, Nancy Carroll, and Randolph Scott. This was Grant's first role as a leading man. Based on the novel Hot Saturday by Harvey Fergusson, the film is about a pretty, virtuous, small-town bank clerk who becomes the victim of a vicious rumor.

== Plot ==
Ruth Brock, a pretty young bank clerk, attracts the young men in the small town of Marysville. Rich playboy Romer Sheffield is no exception, although he has Camille staying openly at his mansion, scandalizing the locals. Jealous, Camille soon leaves.

Ruth, however, is all business whenever Romer tries to become better acquainted with her at the bank. She agrees to go on a date on Saturday with fellow employee Conny Billup. Romer invites Conny and his crowd to party at his estate, offering free food and drink, just so he can spend some time with Ruth. They stay long enough for Romer to take Ruth on a long walk and have a heartfelt conversation.

The gang then heads to a lakeshore dance hall. Conny gets Ruth alone on a nighttime boat ride, but she jumps ashore to avoid his unwanted advances. Out of spite, he leaves her behind, and she has to walk to Romer's estate. Conny eventually finds her there, but she does not want to see him, and Romer makes him drive away without her. Romer sends Ruth home in his chauffeured car; she is seen arriving home early in the morning by Eva Randolph, the daughter of an important bank executive.

Inside, Ruth is pleasantly surprised to find childhood friend and geologist Bill Fadden in the kitchen. He has returned to do some surveying after seven years away. Bill makes it clear he is in love with her.

When Eva questions Conny about what happened the night before, he lies. The lies quickly spread, and soon the local gossips have distorted the story so much that everybody thinks that Ruth and Romer are having a brazen affair. As a result, Eva's father fires Ruth.

After quarreling with her mother, Ruth flees to Bill's campsite. Caught in a rainstorm, she faints just outside Bill's shelter. Bill finds her and brings her inside. When he is unable to awaken her, he removes her wet clothes to keep her warm. When she does regain consciousness, they become engaged, though she does not tell him about the ugly rumors.

However, Conny maliciously has Eva invite Romer to the dance hall where Ruth and Bill are. Once Romer grasps the situation, he graciously tries to bow out, but Bill hears the vicious gossip and breaks off the engagement. By the next morning, Bill has reconsidered, but Ruth informs him that while the stories were not true the night before, they are now in the morning; she spent the night with Romer. Romer picks her up and tells her they will get married in New York.

== Cast ==
- Cary Grant as Romer Sheffield
- Nancy Carroll as Ruth Brock
- Randolph Scott as Bill Fadden
- Edward Woods as Conny Billop
- Lilian Bond as Eva Randolph
- William Collier, Sr. as Mr. Brock, Ruth's father
- Jane Darwell as Mrs. Brock
- Stanley Smith as Joe
- Rita La Roy as Camille
- Rose Coghlan as Annie Brock, Ruth's younger sister
- Oscar Apfel as Mr. Randolph
- Jessie Arnold as Aunt Minnie
- Grady Sutton as Archie, a bank teller

== Reception ==
The New York Times review stated that the film "describes the evolution of an idle bit of gossip in an average American community with considerable freshness and candor, and in the main manages to survive a meandering script and some uneventful writing" and praised Carroll's performance.

Dennis Schwartz rated it B+, calling it an "agreeable dramedy".

== Home media ==
Hot Saturday was released on DVD as part of a three-disc, six-film set entitled Pre-Code Hollywood Collection on 7 April 2009.
