= My Pal, the King =

1932 film

- Directed by: Kurt Neumann; Phillip Karlstein (fill-in)
- Screenplay by: Jack Natteford; Thomas J. Crizer
- Story by: Richard Schayer
- Produced by: Carl Laemmle Jr.
- Starring: Tom Mix
- Cinematography: Daniel B. Clark (uncredited)
- Production company: Universal Pictures
- Distributed by: Universal Pictures
- Release date: August 4, 1932 (US)
- Running time: 60 or 75 minutes
- Country: United States
- Language: English

My Pal, the King is a 1932 American Pre-Code Western film directed by Kurt Neumann, starring Tom Mix, and featuring Mickey Rooney and James Kirkwood. The screenplay concerns a rodeo cowboy who helps a child king.

== Plot ==
Tom Reed's famous traveling Wild West show performs in Alvonia, a small European country, where the child king, ten year old Charles V, neglects his duties because of his interest in the show. After a discussion with Tom, Charles decides that he should treat his subjects fairly, which does not please Count De Mar who has been in control of the country and wants to tax the people heavily. He plots with the Dowager Queen to kidnap Charles and his tutor, Dr. Lorenz, and throws them in a dungeon, and suggests to Lorenz that he kill Charles and then kill himself. Tom learns from Charles' aunt, Princess Elsa that the king is missing, and Tom manages to track him to the fortress where the king is imprisoned. Tom's cowboys and the count's men fight, and the count ends up drowning to death. Tom then rescues the king and his tutor, and Charles promises to always treat his people well.

== Cast ==
- Tom Mix as Tom Reed
- Mickey Rooney as King Charles V
- James Kirkwood as Count De Mar
- Wallis Clark as Dr. Lorenz
- Noel Francis as Princess Elsa
- Finis Barton as Gretchen
- Paul Hurst as Red
- Stuart Holmes as Count Kluckstein
- Jim Thorpe as Black Cloud
- Christian J. Frank as Jailer Etzel
- Clarissa Selwynne as Dowager Queen
- Ferdinand Schumann-Heink as General Wiedeman (uncredited)
- Tony Jr. as Tom's horse
- Harry Cording as Palace Guard (uncredited)
