= Paris Follies of 1956 =

1955 film by Leslie Goodwins

- Directed by: Leslie Goodwins
- Written by: Milton Lazarus (writer)
- Produced by: Buck Houghton (associate producer); Bernard Tabakin (producer)
- Starring: Forrest Tucker; Margaret Whiting; Barbara Whiting
- Cinematography: Edwin B. DuPar
- Distributed by: Allied Artists
- Release date: November 27, 1955
- Running time: 72 minutes
- Country: United States
- Language: English

Paris Follies of 1956 is a 1955 American film directed by Leslie Goodwins. The film is also known as Fresh from Paris in the United States (TV title) and the working title of the film. The film showcases several acts filmed at Frank Sennes' Moulin Rouge Night Club in 1954.

== Plot ==
Dan Bradley owns and operates a Hollywood, California nightclub and is in love with Ruth Harmon, a stage designer for his shows. Dan's a happy man because talented singer Margaret Walton is his headliner and wealthy Alfred Gaylord his financial backer.

Then things go wrong. Margaret, jealous of Ruth, threatens to quit if Dan pays attention to anyone except her. Gaylord's son shows up to take Alfred back to a sanitarium, revealing his father to be irresponsible, not rich.

Margaret's sister, cigarette girl Barbara, manages to persuade Dan's close pal Chuck Russell to audition her to be her sister's understudy. Her timing is good because Margaret gets angry at Dan and does indeed walk off. Barbara, however, gets stage fright and can't go on, resulting in big sister Margaret coming full circle to be the understudy's understudy. She sings and is a great success.

== Cast ==
- Forrest Tucker as Dan Bradley
- Margaret Whiting as Margaret Walton
- Dick Wesson as Chuck Russell
- Martha Hyer as Ruth Harmon
- Barbara Whiting as Barbara Walton
- Lloyd Corrigan as Alfred Gaylord
- Wally Cassell as Harry
- Fluff Charlton as Taffy
- James Ferris as Jim
- William Henry as Wendell
- The Sportsmen Quartet as Themselves
- Frank Parker as himself
