= Ashley Gardens =

Mansion block development in London

Coordinates: 51.49601°N 0.13834°W

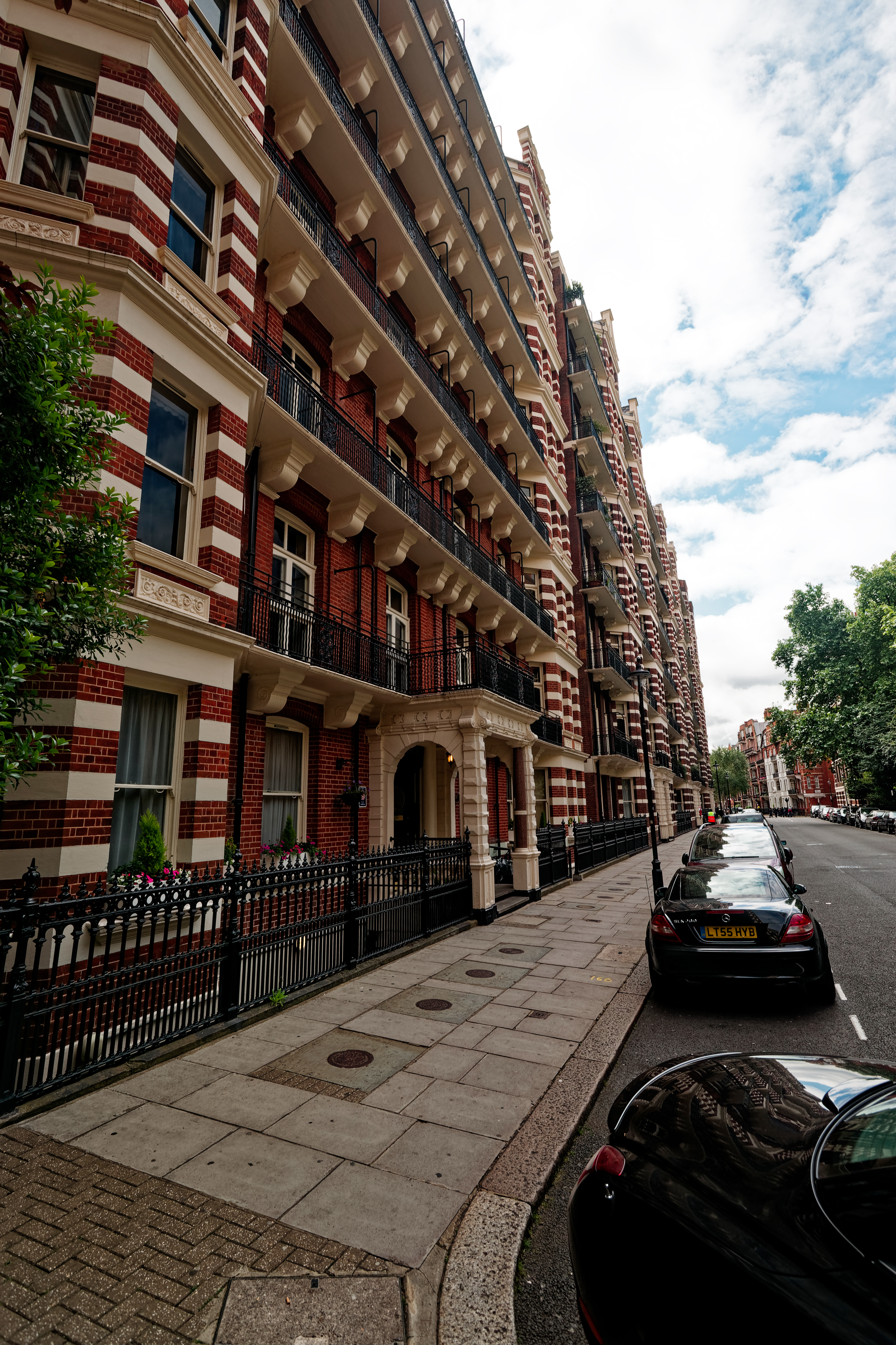
Some of the blocks on Thirlbey Road

Ashley Gardens is a mansion block development in Victoria, London.

== Description ==
The block is residential, constructed between 1890 and 1893. The development consists of several blocks of mansions around a small rectangular garden. Their design is characterised by intentionally repeating units with balconies, typical of mansion block design of the era. With some of the mansions reaching eight storeys, they have imposing facades over the street.

The mansions are part of the Westminster Cathedral conservation area.

Ashley Gardens is mentioned in George Bernard Shaw's The Philanderer.

== See also ==
- Westminster Cathedral
- Victoria Street
