= The Devil's Holiday =

1930 film

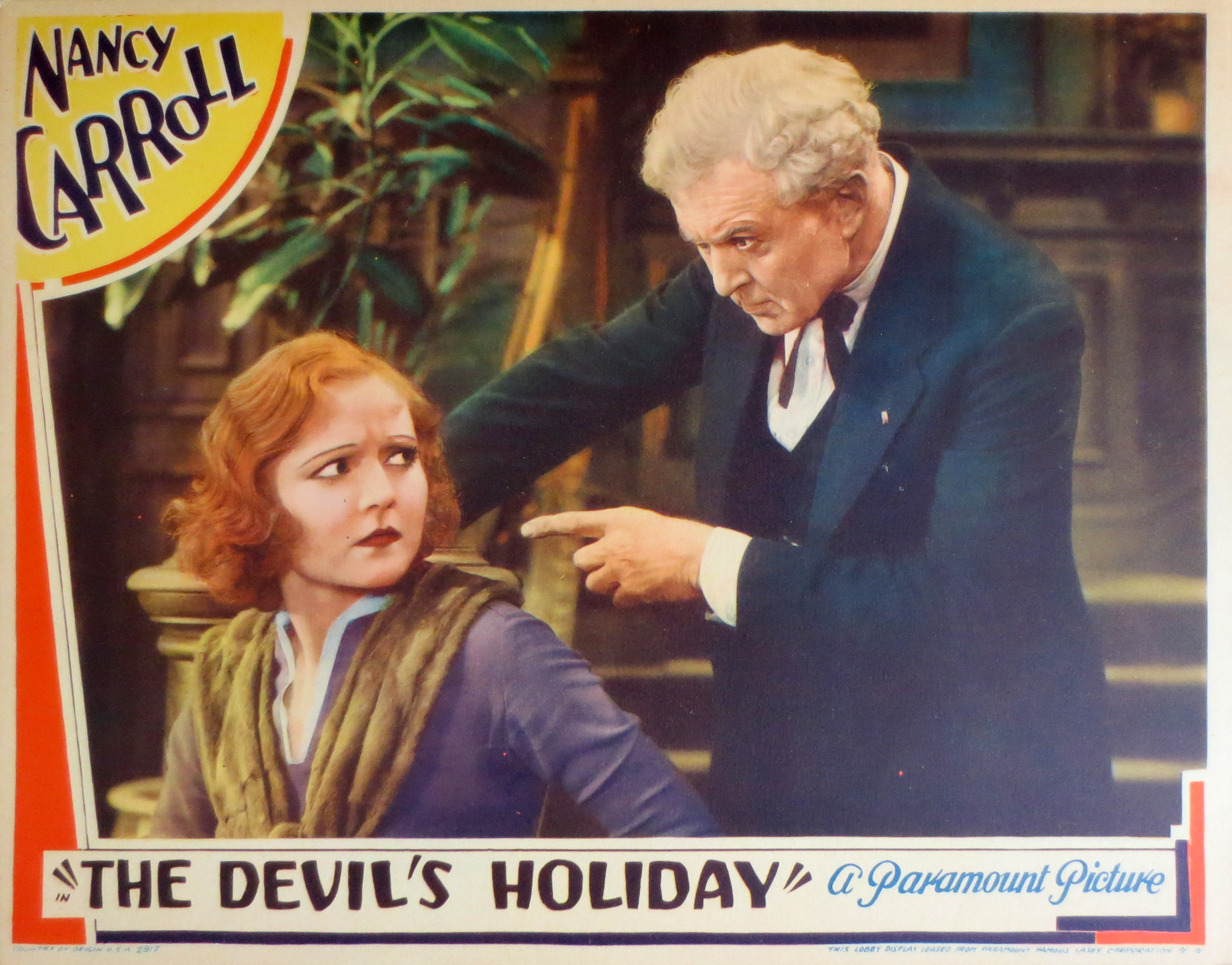
- Lobby card
- Directed by: Edmund Goulding
- Written by: Edmund Goulding (story, screenplay)
- Starring: Nancy Carroll
- Cinematography: Harry Fischbeck; Enzo Riccioni
- Edited by: George Nichols Jr.
- Music by: Edmund Goulding; Leo Robin; Howard Jackson (uncredited); John Leipold (uncredited)
- Distributed by: Paramount Pictures
- Release date: May 9, 1930
- Running time: 80 minutes
- Country: United States
- Language: English

The Devil's Holiday is a 1930 American Pre-Code romantic drama film starring Nancy Carroll, Phillips Holmes, ZaSu Pitts, James Kirkwood, Sr., Hobart Bosworth, and Ned Sparks. The movie was adapted by Edmund Goulding from his story, directed by Goulding, and released by Paramount Pictures. The film was nominated for Academy Award for Best Actress (Nancy Carroll).

== Plot ==
A golddigger marries a young man for his money, but finds that she really loves him and wants to keep him despite his family's disapproval.

== Cast ==
- Nancy Carroll as Hallie Hobart
- Phillips Holmes as David Stone
- James Kirkwood as Mark Stone
- Hobart Bosworth as Ezra Stone
- Ned Sparks as Charlie Thorne
- Morgan Farley as Monkey McConnell
- Jed Prouty as Kent Carr
- Paul Lukas as Dr. Reynolds
- ZaSu Pitts as Ethel
- Morton Downey as Freddie, the tenor
- Guy Oliver as Hammond
- Wade Boteler as House Detective
- Laura La Varnie as Madame Bernstein (credited as Laura Le Vernie)
