= Convention Girl =

1935 film by Luther Reed

- Film poster
- Directed by: Luther Reed
- Written by: George Boyle (novel); George Boyle (screenplay); Max Lief (additional dialogue)
- Produced by: David M. Thomas
- Starring: Rose Hobart; Shemp Howard; Weldon Heyburn; Herbert Rawlinson; Toni Reed
- Cinematography: Nick Rogelli
- Edited by: Emma Hill
- Music by: Isham Jones
- Production company: Falcon Pictures
- Distributed by: First Division Pictures
- Release date: October 31, 1935
- Running time: 66 minutes
- Country: United States
- Language: English

Convention Girl, also known as Atlantic City Romance, is a 1935 American comedy film starring Rose Hobart and featuring Shemp Howard of the Three Stooges. The film was directed by Luther Reed.

== Cast ==
- Rose Hobart as Cynthia "Babe" Laval
- Weldon Heyburn as Bill Bradley
- Herbert Rawlinson as Ward Hollister
- Toni Reed as Tommy Laval
- Shemp Howard as Dan Higgins
- Ruth Gillette as Helen Shalton
- James Spottswood as John "Cupid" Pettyjohn
- Sally O'Neil as Gracie
- Lucille Mendez as Peg
- Nancy Kelly as Betty
- Alan Brooks as Ernest
- William H. White as Penrod
- Nell O'Day as Daisy Miller
- Laliva Browne as Mrs. Pettyjohn
- Isham Jones as Himself
