= Springtime for Henry =

1934 film by Frank Tuttle

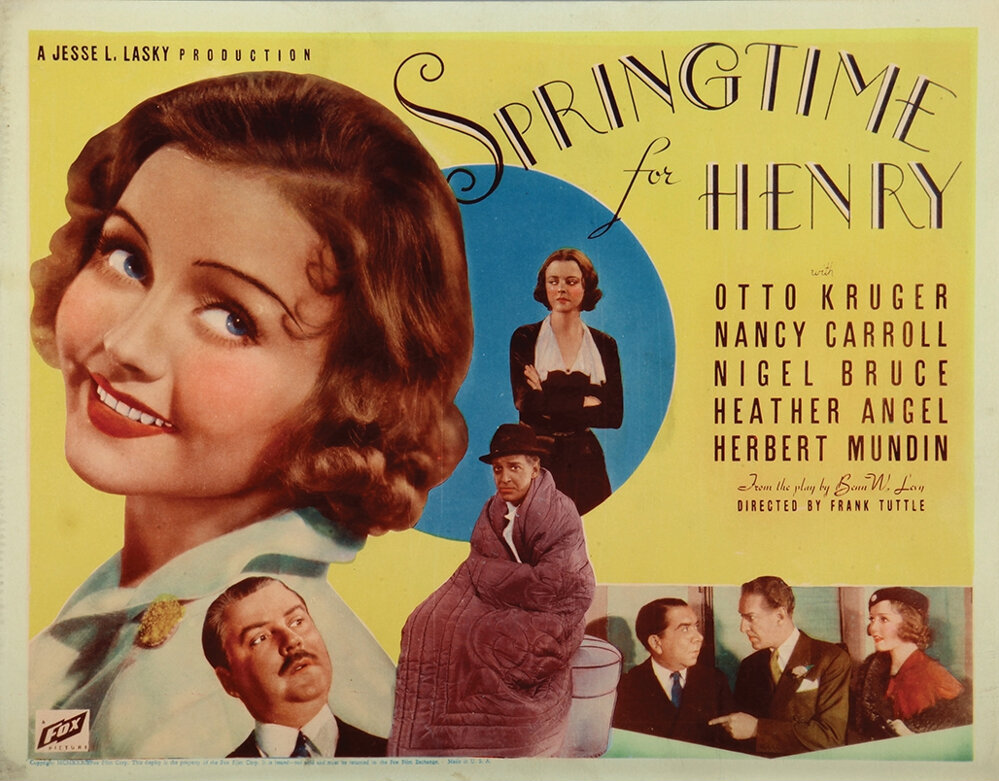
- 1934 lobby card
- Directed by: Frank Tuttle
- Written by: Keene Thompson; Frank Tuttle
- Based on: Springtime for Henry (play) by Benn W. Levy
- Produced by: Jesse L. Lasky
- Starring: Otto Kruger; Nancy Carroll; Nigel Bruce
- Cinematography: John F. Seitz
- Edited by: Jack Murray
- Music by: Peter Brunelli
- Production company: Fox Film
- Distributed by: Fox Film
- Release date: August 22, 1934
- Running time: 75 minutes
- Country: United States
- Language: English

Springtime for Henry is a 1934 American comedy film directed by Frank Tuttle and starring Otto Kruger, Nancy Carroll and Nigel Bruce. It was based on a play of the same name by the British writer Benn W. Levy which enjoyed an eight-month run on Broadway. The film was made on a budget of $250,000 and suffered a considerable loss, taking only $126,000 at the box office.

== Plot ==
Henry Dewlip is the heir to his late father's prosperous automobile plant. He lets underlings run things while he indulges in wine, women and song, stringing women along. Julia Jelliwell is the latest woman to have the key to his apartment but there are problems, like her jealous husband, Johnny. Also the strait-laced Miss Smith, his latest secretary who secretly harbours a crush on him. She manages to spoil things with Julia and then to try to get him to take an interest in his car plant, spoiling a chance for Johnny to sell him a carburetor.

Things fall flat when Henry finds that not only was Miss Smith previously married but she has a baby. This upsets Henry and the butler takes the chance to reinstate the old system that worked so well, so he calls Julia. At a mission for reforming souls, a fight ensues and both Henry and Julia end up in cells. Finally released, he now has a cold.

Later he dictates to Miss Smith in a sharp voice and she says that her husband is dead. She shot him a year previously in Paris. Henry quickly falls out of love with her and goes back to Julia. Henry takes Johnny's carburetor business into his motor business and takes up with Julia. Meanwhile, Johnny has been smitten by Miss Smith.

== Cast ==
Poster for the film featuring Kruger and Carroll

- Otto Kruger as Henry Dewlip
- Nancy Carroll as Julia Jelliwell
- Nigel Bruce as Johnny Jelliwell
- Heather Angel as Miss Smith
- Herbert Mundin as Trivers
- Arthur Hoyt as Alfred Ordway
- Geneva Mitchell as Young Lady

== Bibliography ==
- Solomon, Aubrey. The Fox Film Corporation, 1915-1935: A History and Filmography. McFarland, 2011.
