= Frank Parker (singer) =

American singer (1903–1999)

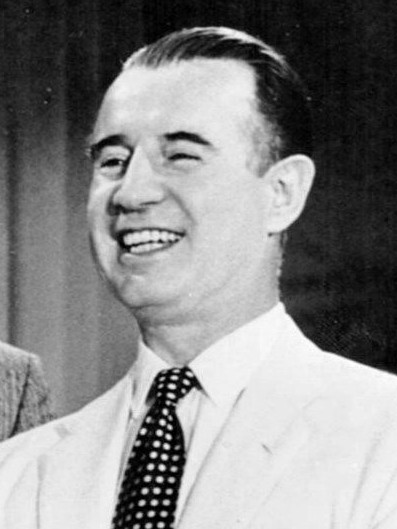
- Parker on Bride and Groom in 1957
- Born: April 29, 1903; New York City, New York
- Died: January 10, 1999 (aged 95); Titusville, Florida
- Other name: Frank Ciccio
- Occupations: Singer, radio and television personality

Frank Parker (April 29, 1903 – January 10, 1999) was an American singer and radio and television personality.

== Early years ==
Parker was born Frank Ciccio on April 29, 1903 in New York City. He was a graduate of the Milan Conservatory of music, and was a dancer in a stage production of Little Nellie Kelly.

== Bands ==
Parker began his singing career as a tenor in 1926 and appeared with Harry Horlick's orchestra in 1933.

== Radio ==
Parker debuted on radio as a substitute singer on The Eveready Hour, and he was a regular on radio and television in the 1930s, 1940s and 1950s with personalities including Jack Benny, George Burns and Arthur Godfrey.

=== 1930s ===
An October 30, 1930, newspaper listing shows Parker singing on the Van Heusen Program on WABC in New York City. Also, in the early 1930s, he was a featured singer with Donald Voorhees and his orchestra on the Bond Sunshine Program on WEAF in New York City.

Parker's tenure with Benny ended in the fall of 1935. When Michael Bartlett replaced Parker on the program, a newspaper article noted: "[Benny] turned Frank Parker into a tenor with a keen sense of humor ... Frank Parker asks $3,000 a week from theatrical booking agents, and usually gets it."

Beginning September 14, 1935, he had his own program, That Atlantic Family on Tour, with Frank Parker, which was heard on 36 CBS stations.

In September and October 1936, Parker and Ramona (no last name printed) were featured on a 15-minute weekly program on WEAF in New York City and WMAQ in Chicago. Beginning June 30, 1937, Parker teamed with Andre Kostelanetz and his orchestra on CBS in a summer replacement program sponsored by Chesterfield cigarettes.

=== 1940s ===
In the early 1940s, he sang with Andre Kostelanetz on broadcasts over WABC in New York City. He was the featured male singer on Your Home Front Reporter, which was broadcast on CBS in 1943.

In 1949, the Teleways company advertised "156 brilliant 15 minute musical programs," episodes of the Frank Parker Show, that were available to radio stations via transcription.

== Television ==
Parker was the host of the 1950s TV show Bride and Groom and a panelist on Masquerade Party. The 1950s saw Parker become a member of the Little Godfreys cast of singers on Arthur Godfrey Time and Arthur Godfrey and His Friends until around 1956. Parker had known Godfrey since the 1930s.

== Film ==
Parker appeared in several movies including Romance in the Rain (1934), Sweet Surrender (1935) and Paris Follies of 1956.

Year	Title	Role	Notes
1934	Romance in the Rain	Master of Ceremonies	
1934	Transatlantic Merry-Go-Round	Himself - Tenor Singer	
1935	Sweet Surrender	Danny O'Day	
1955	Paris Follies of 1956	Himself	(final film role)

== Death ==
Parker died at the age of 95 on January 10, 1999, in Titusville, Florida. His hobbies included golf, polo, and reading.

== Legacy ==
He has a star on the Hollywood Walk of Fame at 6821 Hollywood Boulevard.
