= Katherine Haviland Taylor =

American novelist (1891–1941)

Katherine Haviland Taylor (1891–1941) was an American novelist, playwright, and screenwriter. She was born in Mankato, Minnesota, the daughter of the Rev. Arthur H. Taylor and his wife. Her first published novel was Cecilia of the Pink Roses in 1917. Her last novel was Back Roads published in 1939. She also wrote short stories for magazines and screenplays.

The 1918 film Cecilia of the Pink Roses was adapted from her novel. The story was reprinted in installments along with movie stills as part of a publicity campaign. Two other films were adapted from her 1932 short story "Failure".

Her second novel Cross Currents was described in a brief writeup as a delightful story of modern life.

She had two sisters. She moved to St. Cloud, Florida where she died.

== Writings ==
- Cecilia of the Pink Roses (1917)
- Barbara of Baltimore (1919)
- Yellow Soap (1920) published as a serial in Argosy
- Real Stuff (1921)
- Natalie Page (1921)
- The Second Mrs. Clay (1921)
- Cross Currents (1922)
- Stanley Johns' Wife (1926)
- The None-Hundred Block (1932) J.B. Lippincott Company
- Night Club Daughter (1933)
- Back Roads (1939)
- Pablito
- A Modern Trio in an Old Town
- What Was That?
- Nursery Nights
- New Ground
- The Youngest One (1928)
- Daughter of Divorce
- Real Stuff
- Cross Currents

=== Short stories ===
- "A Paying Investment"
- "How Jeremy Cole's Worst Failures Were Magically Turned Ibto His Greatest Successes" (1924)
- "Hanette and Jack" (1925)
- "Failure" (1932)
- "Mrs. Upton Has Her Fling", adapted to the stage by Hadley Waters as Good Gracious, Mother
- "The Story of Fair Play"

== Theater ==
- The Second Mrs. Clay

== Filmography ==
- Cecilia of the Pink Roses (1918)
- One Man's Journey (1933), adapted from her short story "Failure"
- A Man to Remember (1938), adapted from her short story "Failure"
