= Nancy Carroll (American actress) =

American actress (1903–1965)

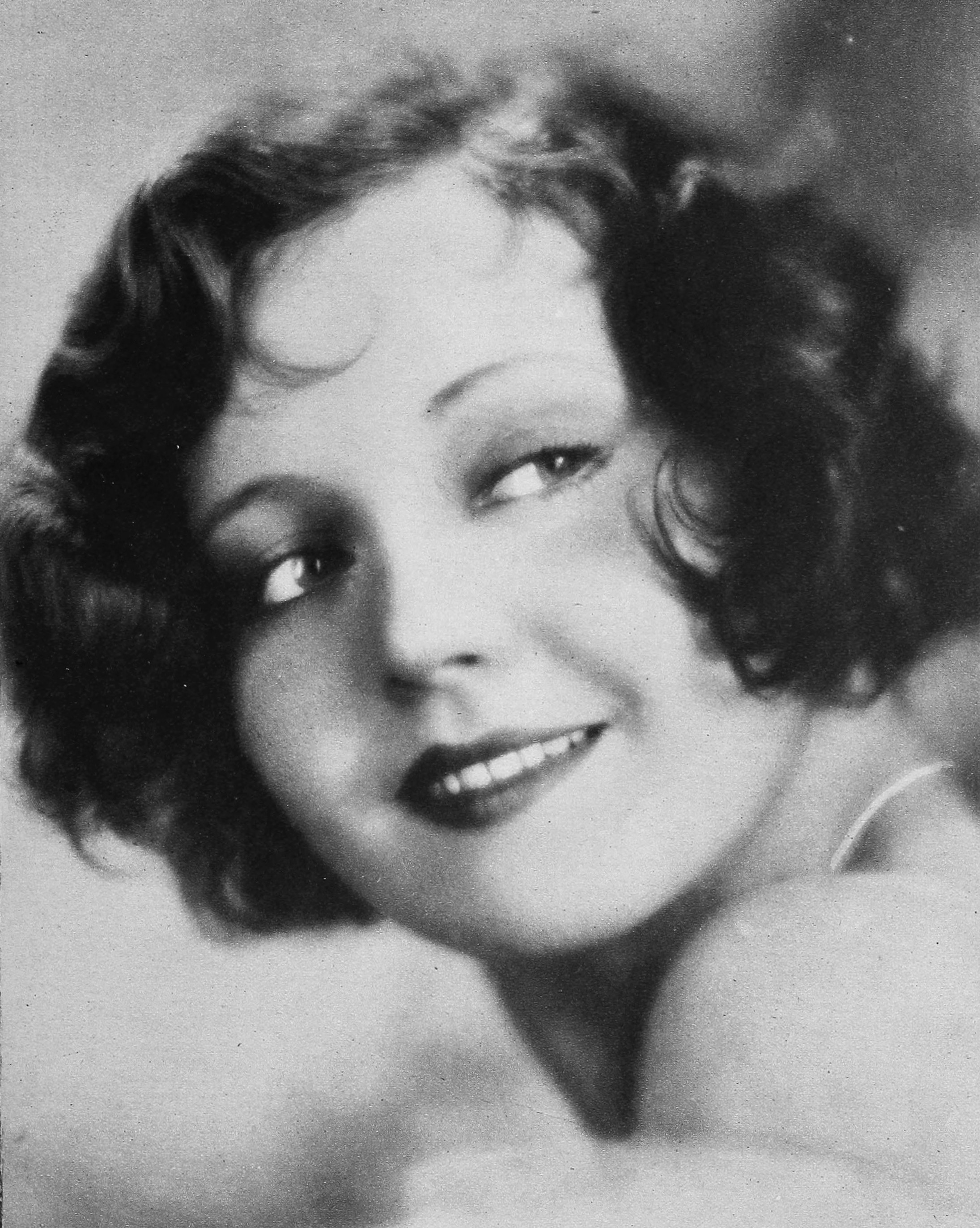
- Carroll in 1930
- Born: Ann Veronica Lahiff; November 19, 1903; New York City, U.S.
- Died: August 6, 1965 (aged 61); New York City, U.S.
- Occupation: Actress
- Years active: 1923–1965
- Spouses: Jack Kirkland (m. 1924; div. 1931); Francis Bolton Mallory (m. 1931; div. 1935); C.H. "Jappe" Groen (m. 1953)

Ann Veronica Lahiff (November 19, 1903 – August 6, 1965), known professionally as Nancy Carroll, was an Oscar-nominated American actress. She started her career in Broadway musicals and then became an actress in sound films and was in many films from 1927 to 1938. Her lone Academy Award nomination was received for her lead performance in the 1930 film The Devil's Holiday. Carroll retired from film in 1938 to return to the stage, and later appeared primarily in television roles from 1950 to 1963. She received a star on the Hollywood Walk of Fame on February 8, 1960.

== Early years ==
Of Irish parentage, the daughter of Thomas and Ann Lahiff, Carroll was born in New York City. Her education came at Holy Trinity School in New York, but she left there at age 16 to work as a stenographer in an office of a lace manufacturer. (Another source says that she left the eighth grade at age 14 "to go on the stage".) She was the seventh of 12 children. Although her parents had named her Ann, she said, "... finally I demanded that I be called Nancy, and they agreed it suited me."

Carroll and her sister "worked up a little specialty number" and auditioned for the Shuberts, which resulted in their performing in a show.

== Career ==
Carroll's career began in 1923 when she performed in the chorus of The Passing Show in New York. She began her acting career in Broadway musicals. Although she initially wanted to be a character actress, she said, "But the moment I took off my hat, and that's the first thing a manager asks you to do when you go to apply for a job — every manager without exception would say: 'You must go into musical comedy. You're just the type. No chance for you in a dramatic production.'" She became a successful actress in sound films because her musical background enabled her to play in movie musicals of the 1930s. Her film debut was in Ladies Must Dress in 1927.

Carroll's early experience included work in "second-rate road companies" and portrayal of Roxie Hart in the Los Angeles production of Chicago.

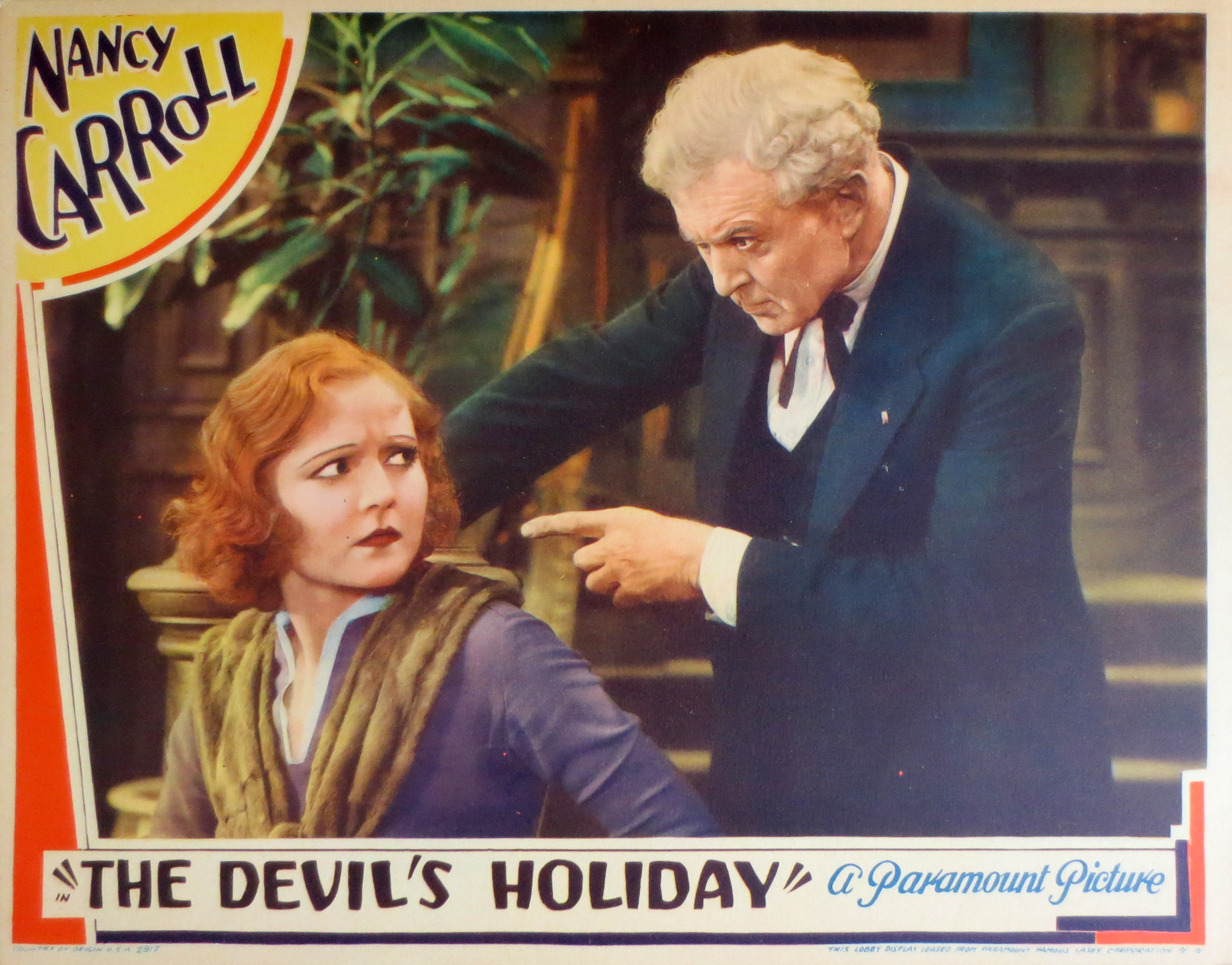
1930 lobby card

In 1928 she made eight films. One of them, Easy Come, Easy Go, co-starring Richard Dix, made her a movie star. In 1929 she starred in The Dance of Life with Hal Skelly, and The Wolf of Wall Street along with George Bancroft and Olga Baclanova. She was nominated for the Academy Award for Best Actress in 1930 for The Devil's Holiday. Among her other films are Laughter (1930), Paramount on Parade (1930), Hot Saturday (1932) with Cary Grant and Randolph Scott, The Kiss Before the Mirror (1933) directed by James Whale, and Broken Lullaby aka The Man I Killed (1932) directed by Ernst Lubitsch.

Under contract to Paramount Pictures, Carroll often balked at the roles the studio offered her, and she earned a reputation as a recalcitrant and uncooperative actress. In spite of her ability to successfully tackle light comedies, tearful melodramas, and even musicals, and as well as garnering considerable praise by the critics and public – she received the most fan mail of any star in the early 1930s – she was released from her contract by the studio. In the mid-1930s under a four-film contract with Columbia Pictures, she made four rather insignificant films and was no longer an A-list actress.

Carroll retired from films in 1938, returned to the stage, and starred as the mother in the early television series The Aldrich Family in 1950. In the following year, she guest-starred in the television version of The Egg and I, starring her daughter, Patricia Kirkland.

== Personal life and death ==
Carroll's first husband was author Jack Kirkland. They were married seven years and divorced in 1931. Also in 1931 she married educator Francis Bolton Mallory. They were together for three years and separated for three years before they were divorced. She was married to C. H. J. Groen, a manufacturer of fiberglass. On August 6, 1965, she was found dead after failing to arrive at the theater for a performance. The cause of her death was an aneurysm. She was 61 years old.

== Hollywood Walk of Fame ==
For her contributions to the film industry, Carroll has a motion picture star on the Hollywood Walk of Fame at 1725 Vine Street. The star was dedicated February 8, 1960.

== Filmography ==
Film
Year	Film	Role	Notes
1927	Ladies Must Dress	Mazie	
1928	Abie's Irish Rose	Rosemary Murphy	Incomplete
1928	Easy Come, Easy Go	Barbara Quayle	Lost film
1928	Chicken a La King	Maisie Devoe	Lost film
1928	The Water Hole	Judith Endicott	Lost film
1928	Manhattan Cocktail	Babs Clark	Lost film except for one-minute montage sequence by Slavko Vorkapich
1928	The Shopworn Angel	Daisy Heath	Incomplete, held at the Library of Congress)
1929	The Wolf of Wall Street	Gert	Lost film
1929	Sin Sister	Pearl	Lost film
1929	Close Harmony	Marjorie Merwin	
1929	The Dance of Life	Bonny Lee King	
1929	Illusion	Claire Jernigan	
1929	Sweetie	Barbara Pell	
1930	Dangerous Paradise	Alma	Alternate title: Two Against Death
1930	Honey	Olivia Dangerfield	
1930	The Devil's Holiday	Hallie Hobart	Nominated for Best Actress Academy Award
1930	Laughter	Peggy Gibson	
1930	Paramount on Parade	Herself	cameo appearance
1930	Follow Thru	Lora Moore	
1931	Stolen Heaven	Mary	
1931	The Night Angel	Yula Martini	
1931	Personal Maid	Nora Ryan	
1932	Broken Lullaby	Fraulein Elsa	Alternate title: The Man I Killed
1932	Wayward	Daisy Frost	
1932	Hot Saturday	Ruth Brock	
1932	Scarlet Dawn	Tanyusha Krasnoff	
1932	Under-Cover Man	Lora Madigan	
1933	Child of Manhattan	Madeleine McGonegle	
1933	The Woman Accused	Glenda O'Brien	
1933	The Kiss Before the Mirror	Maria Held	
1933	I Love That Man	Grace Clark	
1934	Springtime for Henry	Julia Jelliwell	
1934	Transatlantic Merry-Go-Round	Sally Marsh	Alternate title: Keep 'Em Laughing
1934	Jealousy	Josephine "Jo" Douglas O'Roarke	
1935	I'll Love You Always	Nora Clegg	
1935	After the Dance	Anne Taylor	
1935	Atlantic Adventure	Helen Murdock	
1938	That Certain Age	Grace Bristow	
1938	There Goes My Heart	Dorothy Moore	
Television
Year	Title	Role	Notes
1950–1951	The Aldrich Family	Alice Aldrich #2	Unknown episodes
1951	Faith Baldwin Romance Theatre		1 episode
1951	The Egg and I	Betty's mother	Unknown episodes
1959	The Further Adventures of Ellery Queen	Fanny Wilson	1 episode
1961	Naked City	Bernice Hacker	1 episode
1962	The United States Steel Hour		2 episodes
1963	Rockabye the Infantry	Hortense Tyler	Television movie
1963	Going My Way	Nora Callahan	"Cornelius Come Home" (her final screen role on ABC-TV)
