= Stolen Heaven (1931 film) =

1931 film

- Directed by: George Abbott
- Written by: George W. Hill (screenwriter); George Abbott (screenwriter)
- Starring: Nancy Carroll; Phillips Holmes; Louis Calhern
- Cinematography: George J. Folsey
- Edited by: Emma Hill
- Distributed by: Paramount Pictures
- Release date: February 21, 1931
- Running time: 76 minutes
- Country: United States
- Language: English

Stolen Heaven is a 1931 American Pre-Code drama film directed by George Abbott and starring Nancy Carroll, Phillips Holmes, and Louis Calhern. It was released on February 21, 1931, by Paramount Pictures.

== Plot ==
Mary, a girl of the streets, and Joe, a young thief, rob twenty thousand dollars and decide to spend all the money and then commit suicide. But Joe's conscience speaks louder and he confesses the crime. He goes to prison knowing that Mary will wait for him.

== Cast ==
- Nancy Carroll as Mary
- Phillips Holmes as Joe
- Louis Calhern as Steve Perry
- Edward Keane as Detective Morgan
- Guy Kibbee as Police Commissioner

== See also ==
- 1931 in film
- List of American films of 1931
- List of drama films
- List of Paramount Pictures films
