= Charles Beahan =

American filmmaker

Charles Beahan (Feb 11, 1903 -August 18, 1968) was a writer of plays, novels, stories, and screenplays in the United States.

Clearfield, Pennsylvania was his "hometown". He married actress Sidney Fox. He had a son, Robert Shnayerson, in 1925 with nightclub singer Madalene Griffin. They divorced when he was six and Ned Shnayerson became the boy's stepfather.

He worked for Mrs. E. K. Adams at Pathe Exchange's story department.

He died at Valley Doctors Hospital in North Hollywood.

== Novels ==
- The Island God Forgot, co-author

== Theater ==
- Dearly Beloved (1933), co-author
- Jarnegan (1928)
- Buckaroo (1929)
- Little Orchid Annie (1930), co-wrote with Hadley Waters
- Hold Your Horses (1933)

== Filmography ==
- Untamed Youth (1924), co-wrote the film adaptation of Born of the Cyclone by G. Marion Burton
- Virgin Lips (1928), co-wrote
- Naughty Baby (1928), wrote the story the film was based on
- Frankie and Johnnie (1929), story
- The Line-Up (1929), story, a 2-reel film
- Ladies in Love (1930)
- Dangerous Nan McGrew (1930), co-wrote
- Murder by the Clock (1931), wrote a play that inspired part of the film
- Night Court (1932), co-wrote
- One Night of Love (1934), co-wrote
- Highway Patrol (1935), 1-reel
- Sweet Surrender (1935), a musical film, co-wrote acreebplay
