= Ernita Lascelles =

English actress and writer (1890–1972)

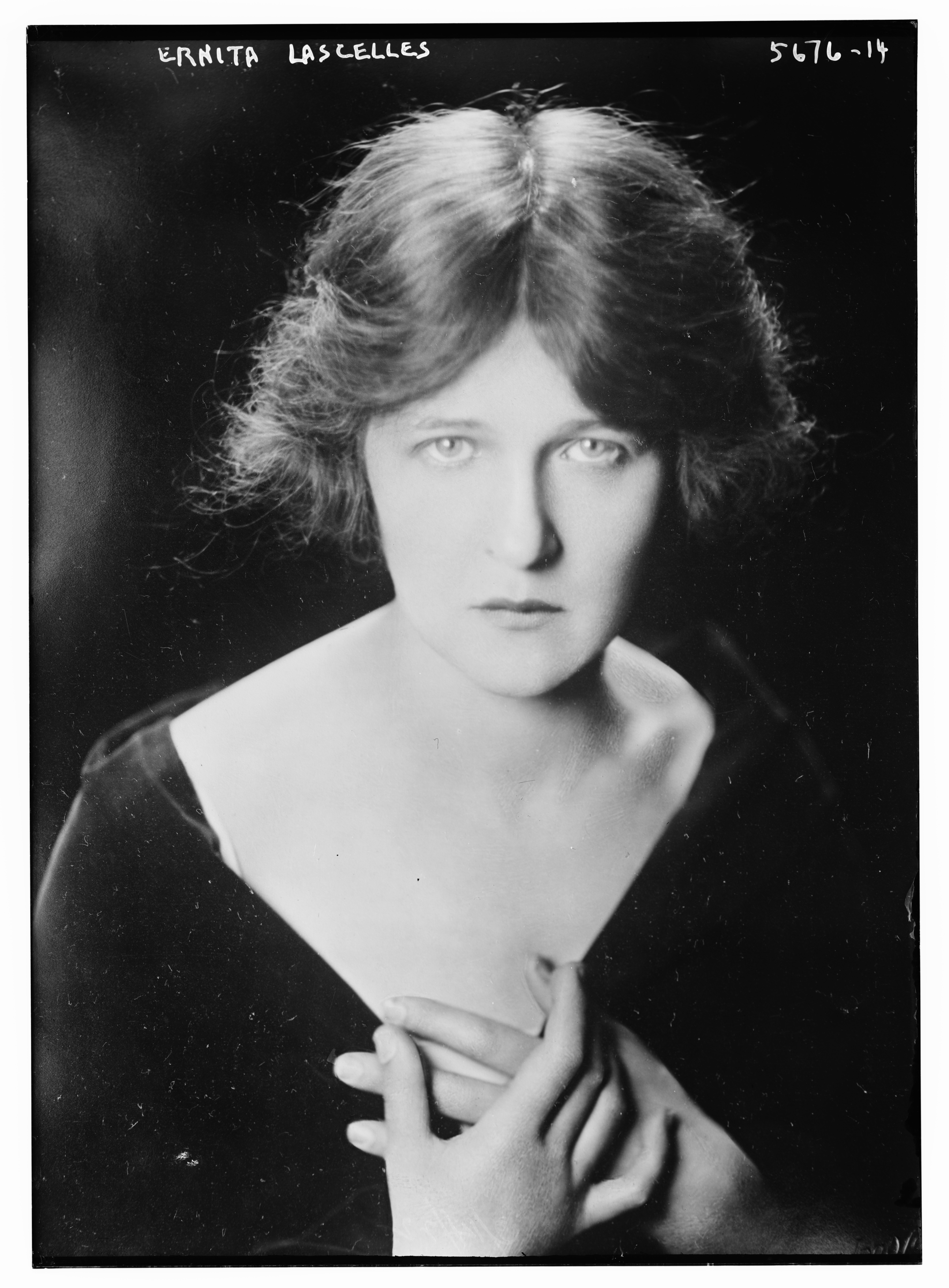
- Ernita Lascelles, from the Library of Congress
- Born: May 1, 1890; Chile
- Died: June 23, 1972 (aged 82); New Hope, Pennsylvania, U.S.
- Other name: Ernita Lascelles Ranson
- Occupations: Actress, playwright, novelist
- Spouse: Herbert Walter Ranson (m. 1908-1970; his death)
- Children: 2

Ernita Lascelles Ranson (May 1, 1890 – June 23, 1972) was an English actress, novelist, and playwright.

== Early life and education ==
Lascelles was born to English parents in Chile. She studied acting with Richard Boleslavski in 1923.

== Career ==
Lascelles was a stage actress in New York City and London. Her stage credits included roles in Much Ado About Nothing (1904), Doctor Faustus (1904), The Comedy of Errors (1904), Love and a Half-Pence (1906), When Knights Were Bold (1907), Lady Windemere's Fan (1911), The Miniature (1911), The Double Game (1912), A Gauntlet (1913), The Son and Heir (1913) Disraeli (1914), The Philanderer (1914), Plaster Saints (1914), When the Young Vine Blooms (1915), Gamblers All (1917), The Tragedy of Nan (1919), Polly with a Past (1919),The Madras House (1921), From Morn til Midnight (1922), Back to Methuselah (1922), The Dice of the Gods (1923), The Living Mask (1924), The Mongrel (1924), Adam Solitaire (1925), Fanny's First Play (1932), One Wife or Another (1933), The Silver Box (1935), and Murder with Pen and Ink (1935). She later starred in a 1944 production of Medea at Columbia University, but a reviewer found her performance "appalling, though admirably consistent in its misreading".

Her first novel, The Sacrificial Goat (1923), was set in the London theatre world, with a working actress as the main character, and another character based on George Bernard Shaw. Plays by Lascelles included a farce, Listen to Me (1926), The Bride Confesses (1932), Oh Youth! (1934) and historical plays Fire (1942), about Thomas Cranmer, and Lucretia (1927), about Lucrezia Borgia.

In 1953, Lascelles was on the staff of a girls' camp in Vermont.

== Personal life ==
Lascelles married fellow English actor Herbert Walter Ranson in 1908. They had daughters Joan and Naomi. Her husband died in 1970, and Lascelles died in 1972, aged 82, in New Hope, Pennsylvania.
