= Desert flower =

Desert flower may refer to:

- The Desert Flower, an 1863 opera by William Vincent Wallace
- Desert Flower, a 1998 biography of Somali model Waris Dirie
- Desert Flower (film), a 2009 German film adaptation of the biography
- The Desert Flower, a 1924 play by Don Mullally
- The Desert Flower (film), a 1925 American Western film based on Mullally's play
- Desert Flower (horse), thoroughbred racehorse
- Desert Flower, a Native American hound character in the 1988 animated film The Good, the Bad, and Huckleberry Hound
