= Sweet Music =

1935 film by Alfred E. Green

- Theatrical release poster
- Directed by: Alfred E. Green
- Screenplay by: Jerry Wald; Carl Erickson; Warren Duff
- Story by: Jerry Wald
- Produced by: Samuel Bischoff
- Starring: Rudy Vallée; Ann Dvorak; Ned Sparks; Helen Morgan; Robert Armstrong; Allen Jenkins
- Cinematography: James Van Trees
- Edited by: Herbert Leonard
- Music by: Bernhard Kaun
- Production company: Warner Bros. Pictures
- Distributed by: Warner Bros. Pictures
- Release date: February 23, 1935
- Running time: 100 minutes
- Country: United States
- Language: English

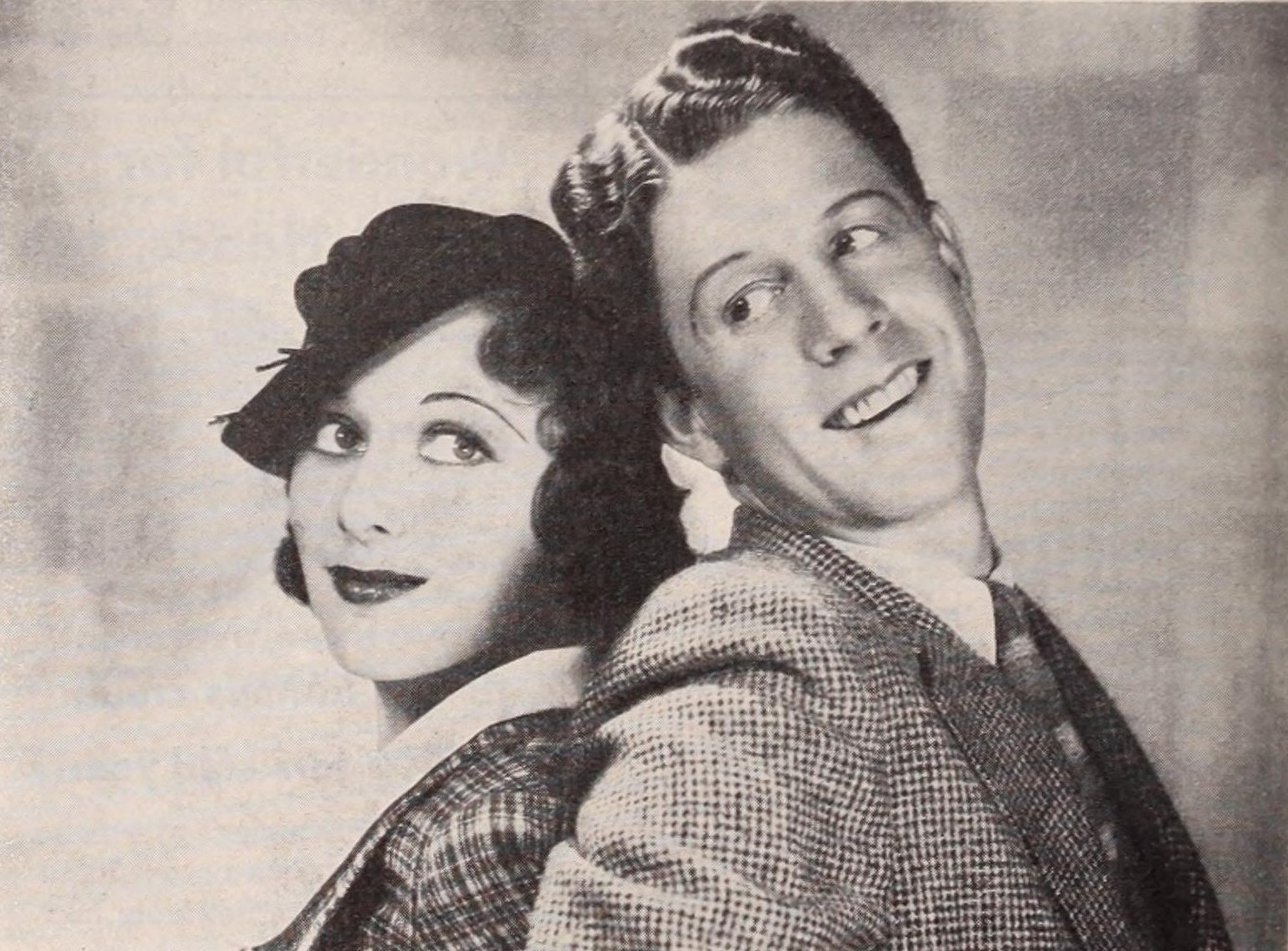
Bonnie Haydon (Dvorak) and Skip Houston (Vallée)

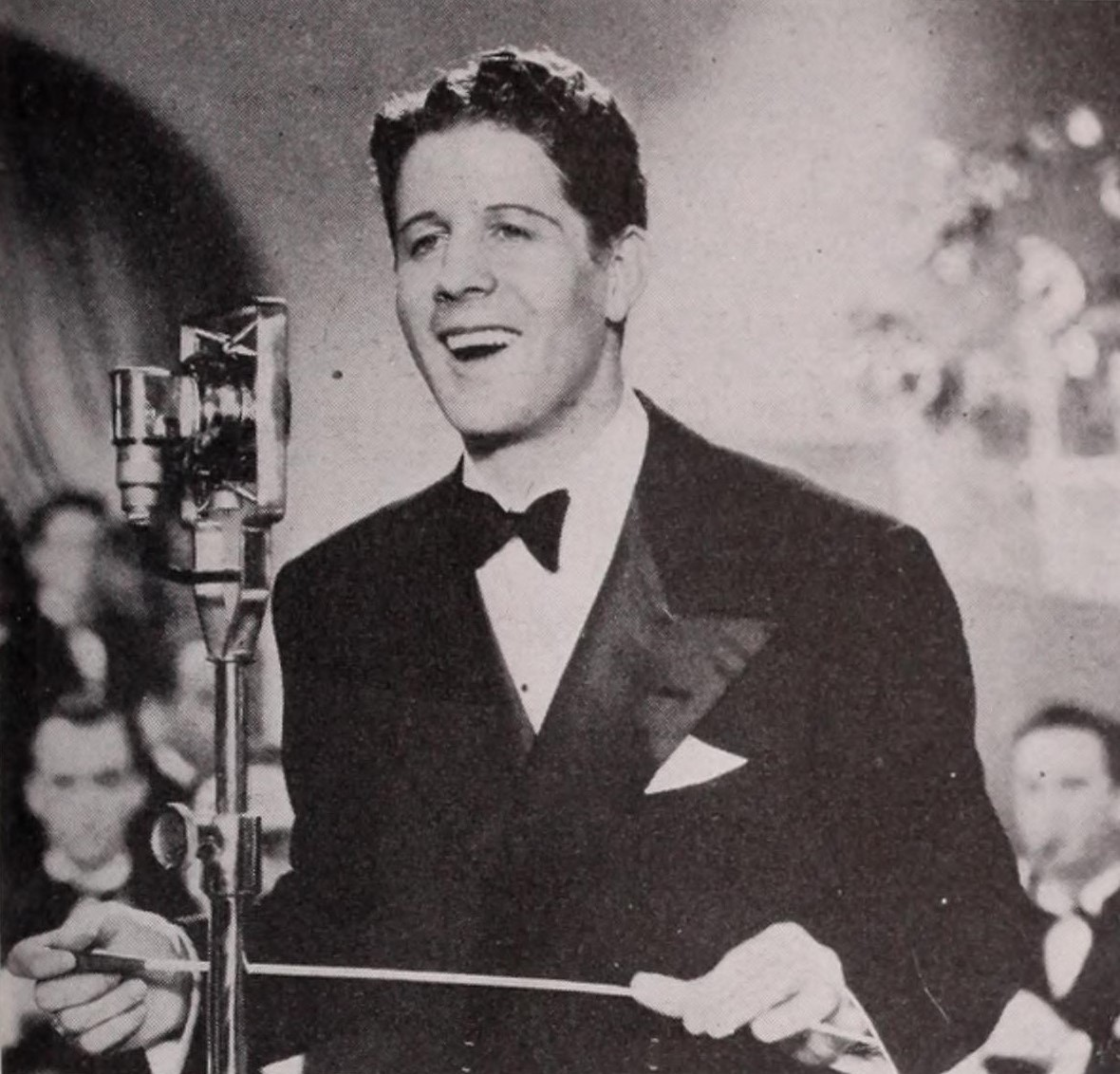
Rudy Vallée sings and conducts his band, The Connecticut Yankees, in the film

Sweet Music is a 1935 American musical film directed by Alfred E. Green, written by Jerry Wald, Carl Erickson and Warren Duff, and starring Rudy Vallée, Ann Dvorak, Ned Sparks, Helen Morgan, Robert Armstrong and Allen Jenkins. It was released by Warner Bros. Pictures on February 23, 1935.

== Plot ==
Bonnie Haydon is an aspiring star, who is often paired with Skip Houston by coincidence, much to her dismay. They taunt each other in a very screwball style, but over time, she learns that she has Houston to thank for her success.

== Cast ==
- Rudy Vallée as Skip Houston
- Ann Dvorak as Bonnie Haydon
- Ned Sparks as 'Ten Percent' Nelson
- Helen Morgan as Helen Morgan
- Robert Armstrong as 'Dopey' Malone
- Allen Jenkins as Barney Cowan
- Alice White as Lulu Betts Malone
- Joseph Cawthorn as Sidney Selzer
- Al Shean as Sigmund Selzer
- Phillip Reed as Grant
- William B. Davidson as Billy Madison
- Henry O'Neill as Louis Trumble
- Russell Hicks as Mayor
- Clay Clement as Mr. Johnson

== Songs ==
- "Sweet Music"
- "There's a Different You (in Your Heart)"
- "Ev'ry Day"
- "The Good Green Acres of Home"
- "Outside"
- "There Is a Tavern in the Town" ("The Drunkard Song")
- "I See Two Lovers"
- "Fare Thee Well, Annabelle"
