= The Amazing Mr. Malone =

American radio crime drama series (1947–1951)

- Other names: Murder and Mr. Malone; John J. Malone for the Defense; Attorney John J. Malone
- Country of origin: United States
- Language: English
- Syndicates: ABC; NBC
- Starring: Gene Raymond; George Petrie; Frank Lovejoy
- Announcer: Arthur Gary; Art Gilmore; Dick Tufeld
- Created by: Craig Rice
- Produced by: Bernard L. Schubert

The Amazing Mr. Malone (initially known as Murder and Mr. Malone) is an American radio crime drama series based on the John Malone series of mystery novels by Craig Rice. The series ran on ABC from January 11, 1947, through September 24, 1950, and was broadcast on NBC Radio from May 25, 1951, through July 13, 1951.

== Characters and story ==
Socialite John Joseph Malone is a tough Chicago criminal lawyer who takes on a new case in each episode. Each episode began by establishing who the suspects were for a specified crime. After one of them was arrested, Malone was hired to defend the accused person. Malone never gives up until justice is done. Malone went beyond defending his clients in court by "taking to the streets to uncover the evidence he needs to clear them."

Frank Lovejoy had the title role initially. Gene Raymond replaced him effective September 21, 1949, and George Petrie replaced Raymond beginning on Jay 25, 1951.

== Production ==
Bernard L. Schubert was the producer; Bill Rousseau and Richard Lewis were the directors. The writers were Craig Rice and Gene Wang. John Duffy provided the music. Announcers were Dresser Dahlstead, Arthur Gary, Art Gilmore, and Dick Tufeld.

The Malone character first appeared in the book Eight Faces at Three in 1939. The Amazing Mr. Malone was developed by Bernard L. Schubert.

== Television ==
The series had a brief television run from September 24, 1951, to March 10, 1952, on ABC, with Lee Tracy in the title role. The TV series was sponsored by the Seiberling Rubber Company of Akron, Ohio and was seen alternately with Mr. District Attorney.
