= Moon River (radio program) =

- Running time: 15–30 minutes
- Country of origin: United States
- Language: English
- Home station: WLW, Cincinnati, Ohio
- Created by: Ed Byron
- Recording studio: Cincinnati
- Original release: 1930 – 1970
- Audio format: Mono
- Opening theme: "Caprice Viennois" by Fritz Kreisler

Moon River was a long-running late-night American radio program which originated from WLW in Cincinnati, Ohio. A combination of soft, "dreamy" music and romantic poetry set to organ accompaniment, the program aired from 1930 to 1970.

== History ==
Described as "one of the few programs designed to put people to sleep" by onetime announcer Bill Myers, Moon River was created by writer Ed Byron at the behest of WLW station owner Powel Crosley, Jr., who ordered the writer to come up with a poetry show which could accommodate the station's new organ. Retreating to a speakeasy with violinist Virginio Marucci, Byron sketched out some notes, including his original poem that opened the show. At one point, Marucci began playing Fritz Kreisler's "Caprice Viennois," a piece which Byron's poem brought to mind. Both the poem and the musical piece would open the program for its entire forty-year history.

A show with a loyal following over the years, Moon River was canceled by WLW in 1953 in an effort to modernize the schedule, but revived the next summer due to continued listener outcry. In the decade after the program's final broadcast in 1970, a series of Moon River concerts were held in Cincinnati which recreated the program in front of a live audience.

In 1969, the show was cut back to Saturday nights only, due to conflicts with the Cincinnati Royals and the fact that Jim LaBarbara's contemporary music show aired from 7 pm to midnight. A Cincinnati Enquirer article from 1970 said that the show had ended shortly thereafter.

In 1995, WMKV revived it, with Myers as narrator, for a four-year run.

== Personnel ==
Many performers passed through Moon River over the years. The following is only a partial list.

=== Announcers ===
- Arthur R. Ainsworth
- Bob Brown (the first narrator, c. 1930)
- Don Dowd
- Cecil Hale
- Harry Holcombe
- Jay Jostyn
- Jimmy Leonard
- Ken Linn
- Bill Myers
- Peter Grant
- Palmer Ward
- Charles Woods
- Steve Ziegler

=== Vocalists ===
- Phil Brito
- Barbara Cameron
- Janette Davis
- Allison Lerer
- Doris Day
- The DeVore Sisters (Marjorie, Billie, and Ruth)
- Rosemary and Betty Clooney
- Anita Ellis
- Lucille Norman
- Juanita Vastine aka Sweet Georgia Brown
- Ruby Wright

=== Organists ===
- Charles M. "Pat" Gillick (the first organist, c. 1930)
- Fats Waller (c. 1932–1934)
- Lee Erwin (1933–1944)
- Herschel Luecke (1950's)
