= Theatre-Five =

American radio dramatic anthology series (1964–1965)

Theatre-Five (aka Theater-Five or Theatre 5) was a radio drama series, presented by the ABC Radio Network between 1964 and 1965, and broadcast from New York City. The series used an anthology format, presenting a number of short (20-minute) radio plays across a number of genres, a number of which reflected topical issues contemporary with its airing.

Writers for the show varied, as did actors, although the roster included George O. Petrie, Brett Morrison, Jackson Beck, Robert Dryden, Elliott Reid, Court Benson, Cliff Carpenter, and Bryna Raeburn. The show's 1965 run featured several well-known actors, including an early role for James Earl Jones (Incident on US 1), a pre-M*A*S*H Alan Alda (A Bad Day's Work), and radio veteran Ed Begley (The Pigeon) three years after his Academy Award win. Another Theatre-Five actor was Romeo Muller, who also wrote stories for the series but who became best known for his work with Rankin/Bass Productions such as Rudolph the Red-Nosed Reindeer.

The ABC Radio Network Advance Program Schedule for January 1965 indicates Theatre-Five was fed to subscribing affiliates from 2:30 to 2:54 PM EST and again from 10:29 to 10:54 PM EST Monday through Friday.

== Background ==
In the spring of 1964, ABC put Ed Byron in charge of the network's plan "for the restoration of top-grade radio drama". At that time, Byron was an account executive in news program sales at NBC Television, but earlier in his career he had developed radio programs, including Mr. District Attorney. ABC's plan to restore drama to radio had begun more than a year before Byron was selected. A report in the trade publication Variety attributed the delay to "a shortage of writing talent the we felt would be up to projected standards."

== Sources ==
- Theatre Five (Theatre 5) Radio Program
- ABC Radio Network Advance Program Schedule, January, 1965
