= The Adventures of Christopher Wells =

CBS radio crime drama

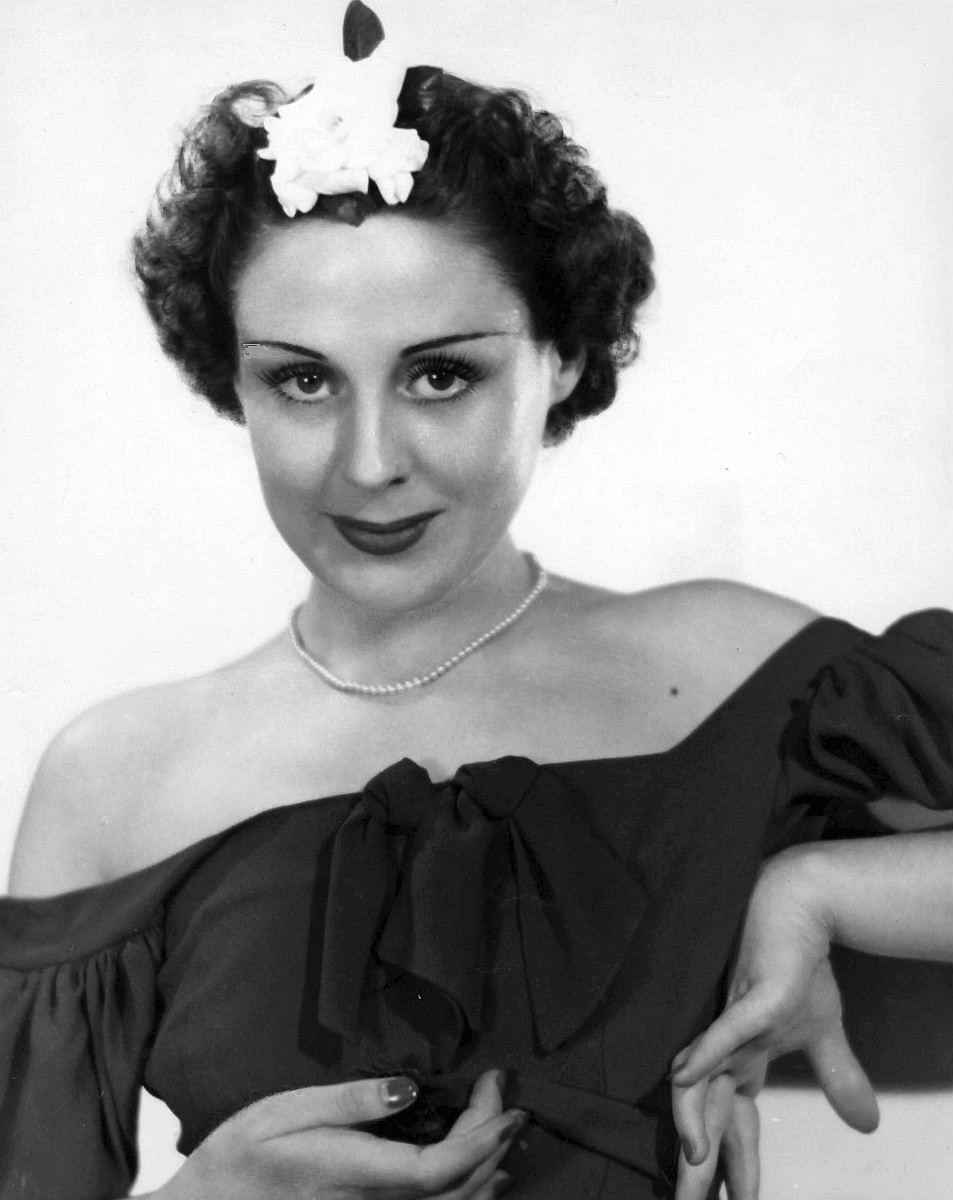
- Vicki Vola portrayed Stacy McGill, assistant to Christopher Wells.
- Genre: Crime drama
- Running time: 30 minutes
- Country of origin: United States
- Language(s): English
- Syndicates: CBS
- Original release: September 28, 1947 – June 22, 1948

The Adventures of Christopher Wells is a 30-minute radio crime drama broadcast on CBS from September 28, 1947, to June 22, 1948.

It debuted at 10 p.m. Eastern Time on Sunday and remained there through January 1948. Beginning on February 3, 1948, it aired on Tuesdays at 9:30 p.m. E. T. The move was part of a CBS "mood programming" strategy, which put dramatic programs on Tuesday evenings, comedy shows on Friday nights, and musical offerings on Sunday afternoons. The shift to Tuesday was fatal, as it placed the drama opposite Fibber McGee and Molly on NBC.

Sponsored by DeSoto-Plymouth, the program was created and directed by Ed Byron, who also created the more successful Mr. District Attorney.

Myron McCormick had the title role of globe-trotting journalist Wells, and Charlotte Lawrence portrayed Stacy McGill, Wells' assistant. Les Damon and Vicki Vola took over those lead roles in February 1948. Edward A. Byron was producer-director. Peter Van Streeden furnished the background music.

Robert Shaw's scripts usually placed Wells in a different country each week. For Newsweek, Byron offered a back story on Wells, noting that he was born September 28, 1912, sold newspapers and worked as a $16-a-week cub reported on a New York daily newspaper before becoming a featured columnist with traits of Nellie Bly, Richard Harding Davis and Walter Winchell.

In its original time slot, the show's competition included Take It or Leave It.

== Critical response ==
A review in the trade publication Variety said that the premiere episode had "an unbelievable situation" in which "All the old cliches and pat quips were yanked out and strung together." The review found fault with McCormick's acting as well as with the scripts and said that Byron's direction did not match the quality of his work on Mr. District Attorney.

Jack Gould wrote in a review in The New York Times that the premiere episode "was produced with Mr. Byron's usual eclat and assurance". He complimented McCormick's performance and predicted that the program should fare well in ratings.

A review in the trade publication Billboard called the program "straight escapist stuff" with "no attempt to adhere to realism". It said that the show succeeded in "building considerable tension" and complimented the dialog, the production, and the acting.
