= Night Court (disambiguation) =

Night Court is a 1984–1992 American television sitcom that aired on NBC.

Night Court may also refer to:

- In the criminal law of the United States, a court which operates at night
- Night Court (2023 TV series), an NBC television series spin-off from the original
- Night Court (film), a 1932 American crime film directed by W. S. Van Dyke

== See also ==
- Night Court U.S.A., a 1958 US TV show about night courts
