= Foreign Assignment =

American old-time radio adventure drama

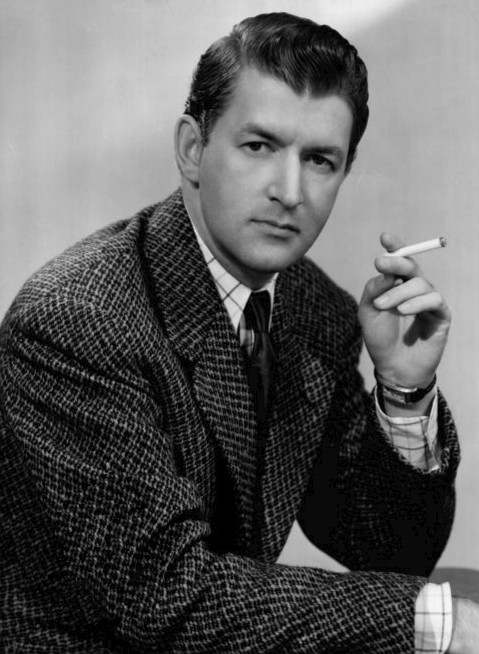
- Jay Jostyn starred as Barry Brian in Foreign Assignment.
- Genre: Adventure drama
- Running time: 30 minutes
- Country of origin: United States
- Language(s): English
- Syndicates: Mutual
- Starring: Jay Jostyn; Vicki Vola
- Announcer: Joe Julian
- Created by: Frank H. Phares
- Written by: Frank H. Phares
- Directed by: Chuck Vincent
- Original release: July 24, 1943 – January 8, 1944

Foreign Assignment is an American old-time radio adventure drama. It was broadcast on the Mutual Broadcasting System from July 24, 1943, to January 8, 1944.

== Format ==
With World War II as background, Foreign Assignment related the activities of journalist Barry Brian and his assistant, Carol Manning, who were stationed in France, working for the American Press (a fictitious entity). The program's introduction came with the sound of a teletype printer in the background as the announcer intoned, "... that machine is beating out a story written especially for you; a story unfolded against the screen of actual events that are making the news." Journalism, however, was a cover, for Brian and Manning were really spies who worked against the Gestapo, leading the way for other radio series in which spies posed as reporters.

== Personnel ==
Jay Jostyn and Vicki Vola portrayed Barry and Manning, while during the same time span they had the two leading roles in Mr. District Attorney on NBC radio. Guy Repp, Bartlett Robinson, and Maurice Wells were often heard in supporting roles. The announcer was Joe Julian. Frank H. Phares was the creator and the writer. Chuck Vincent was the director. Henry Sylvern and his orchestra provided the music.
