= The Amazing Mr. Malone (TV series) =

American TV legal drama series (1951–1952)

- Written by: Alvin Boretz; James Blumgarten; Gene Wang, Ben Feiner Jr.; Peter Barry
- Starring: Lee Tracy
- Country of origin: United States

Production
- Producers: Edgar Peterson; Bernard L. Schubert

Original release
- Network: ABC
- Release: September 24, 1951 – March 10, 1952

The Amazing Mr. Malone is an American television legal drama that was broadcast on ABC from September 24, 1951, through March 10, 1952. It was the "earliest prime time network dramatic series to feature a lawyer protagonist."

== Background and premise ==
Criminal defense attorney John J. Malone first appeared in Craig Rice's novel Eight Faces at Three (1939), although other characters were more prominent in that book. Rice soon made Malone the main character in other novels. Three films were made about Malone: Having Wonderful Crime (1945), The Lucky Stiff (1949), and Mrs. O'Malley and Mr. Malone (1950). A radio series, The Amazing Mr. Malone, ran on ABC and NBC from 1947 to 1951.

In his print debut, Malone was a "dour, cynical, hard-drinking attorney". The radio version depicted him "as a girl-chasing quipster who drank only occasionally", and that characterization carried over to the TV adaptation. The series was set in Chicago. Malone often went beyond an attorney's duties to find evidence that might help in his representation of his clients. Lee Tracy portrayed Malone on TV.

== Episodes ==
Partial List of Episodes of The Amazing Mr. Malone
Date	Title	Actors (in addition to Tracy)
September 24, 1951	"Blood Is Thicker Than Water"	George Petrie, Roger De Koven (as Roger de Koven), Chester Stratton, Ann Summers, Gordon Mills, Joseph Julian, Audrey Meadows
October 8, 1951	"Requiem in Blue"	Constance Dowling, Wright King, Jack Edwards, Gilbert Mack, John Malcolm, Bram Nossen, Lawrence Ryle, George Petrie
October 22, 1951	"Where There's A Will"	Frank Pulaski, Martin Brandt, Joyce Randolph, Arthur Walsh, Lewis Charles, Sammy Schwartz
November 5, 1951	"Two Lives Are Better Than One"	Rita Gam, Stiano Braggiotti, Oliver Thorndike, Douglass Watson (as Douglas Watson), Sid Caesar (as Sid Caese)
November 19, 1951	"The Restless Husband"	Joe Bushkin, Glenda Farrell, Peter Barno, Millicent Brower, Guy Sorel, Francis DeSales
December 3, 1951	"To His Dying Day"	Biff McGuire, Ben Chilson, John Marley, Lew Herbert, Harrison Dowd, Connie Lembke
December 17, 1951	"Sauce for the Gander"	Helen Craig, Dennis Harrison, Fred Catania, John W. Farrell, Mike O’Dowd, Glenn Dicue, Larry Robinson
December 31, 1951	"Dead End Street"	Eric Mattson, Riza Royce, Harry Worth, Howard Caine, Ken Konopka, Ralph Camargo (as Ralph Comargo), Virginia Lord
February 11, 1952	"The Target"	Mercer McLeod, Edward Peck, John Boruff, Mary Farrell, Carol Teite
February 25, 1952	"Breakout"	Ray Boyle. Harold McGee, James Rafferty, Allen Nourse, Rusty Lane, Iggy Wolfington, Jean Pearson, Mike O'Dowd

== Production ==
Edgar Peterson and Bernard L. Schubert were the producers, and Peterson was the director. The writers were Alvin Boretz, James Blumgarten, Gene Wang, Ben Feiner Jr., and Peter Barry. Sponsored by Seiberling Tires, the show was broadcast live on Mondays from 8 to 8:30 p.m. Eastern Time, alternating weeks with Mr. District Attorney. It originated from WJZ-TV.

Gene Raymond portrayed Malone in a pilot that was made for ABC in 1950 but was not broadcast.

== Critical response ==
In a review of the September 24, 1951, episode in the trade publication Billboard, Leon Morse complimented Tracy's portrayal of Malone, writing that Tracy "has never been more dynamic" than he was in combining the detective and attorney aspects of Malone, so that "what is unbelievable ... becomes easy to digest". The review also praised the quality of the show's production and the strength of the supporting cast.

Dwight Newton wrote in the San Francisco Examiner that Tracy in the role of Malone provided an excellent video version of the image that listeners had formed from the radio series: "His portrayal is easy-going, sharp-witted and packed with concealed dynamite." Newton added that the stories did not stand out from other mysteries: "Take 'em or leave 'em. But I don't think you'll leave Tracy, often."

A review of the premiere episode in the trade publication Variety said that The Amazing Mr. Malone "should wind up among the top half of television's many whodunits". The review said that the show was structured much like contemporary shows about private detectives. It described the acting as "generally good" and the direction as "competent".
