= Harry Holcombe =

American commercial, film, radio, television, theatre actor and radio director

- Holcombe in King Kong vs. Godzilla, 1963
- Born: Harry John Holcombe; November 11, 1906; Malta, Ohio, U.S.
- Died: September 15, 1987 (aged 80); Valencia, California, U.S.
- Occupations: Commercial, film, radio, television, theatre actor and radio director
- Spouse: Betty Nielsen Holcombe (died. 1982)
- Children: 2

Harry John Holcombe (November 11, 1906 – September 15, 1987) was an American actor and radio director. He was perhaps best remembered as the grandfather in the Country Time commercials, playing the role for almost a decade. Holcombe also played the recurring role of the doctor in the western television series Bonanza.

== Life and career ==
Holcombe was born in Malta, Ohio. He began his career in Chicago, Illinois, directing radio programs including Benny Goodman's program Camel Caravan. He also worked as a poetry reader for the radio program Moon River at WLW in Cincinnati, Ohio. After that, he moved to California, where he began his film and television career, appearing in the 1943 film The Purple V.

Holcombe guest-starred in numerous television programs including The Andy Griffith Show, Harbor Command, 77 Sunset Strip, Perry Mason, The Farmer's Daughter, That Girl, The Law and Mr. Jones, Leave It to Beaver, Here's Lucy and Bewitched, and appeared in films such as The Fortune Cookie, Birdman of Alcatraz, King Kong vs. Godzilla, The Unsinkable Molly Brown, Kisses for My President, When the Boys Meet the Girls and Dead Heat on a Merry-Go-Round. Holcombe also starred in the television sitcom Barefoot in the Park, where he played Arthur Kendricks.

== Death ==
Holcombe died in September 1987 at his son's home in Valencia, California, at the age of 80.
