= Vicki Vola =

American actress (1916–1985)

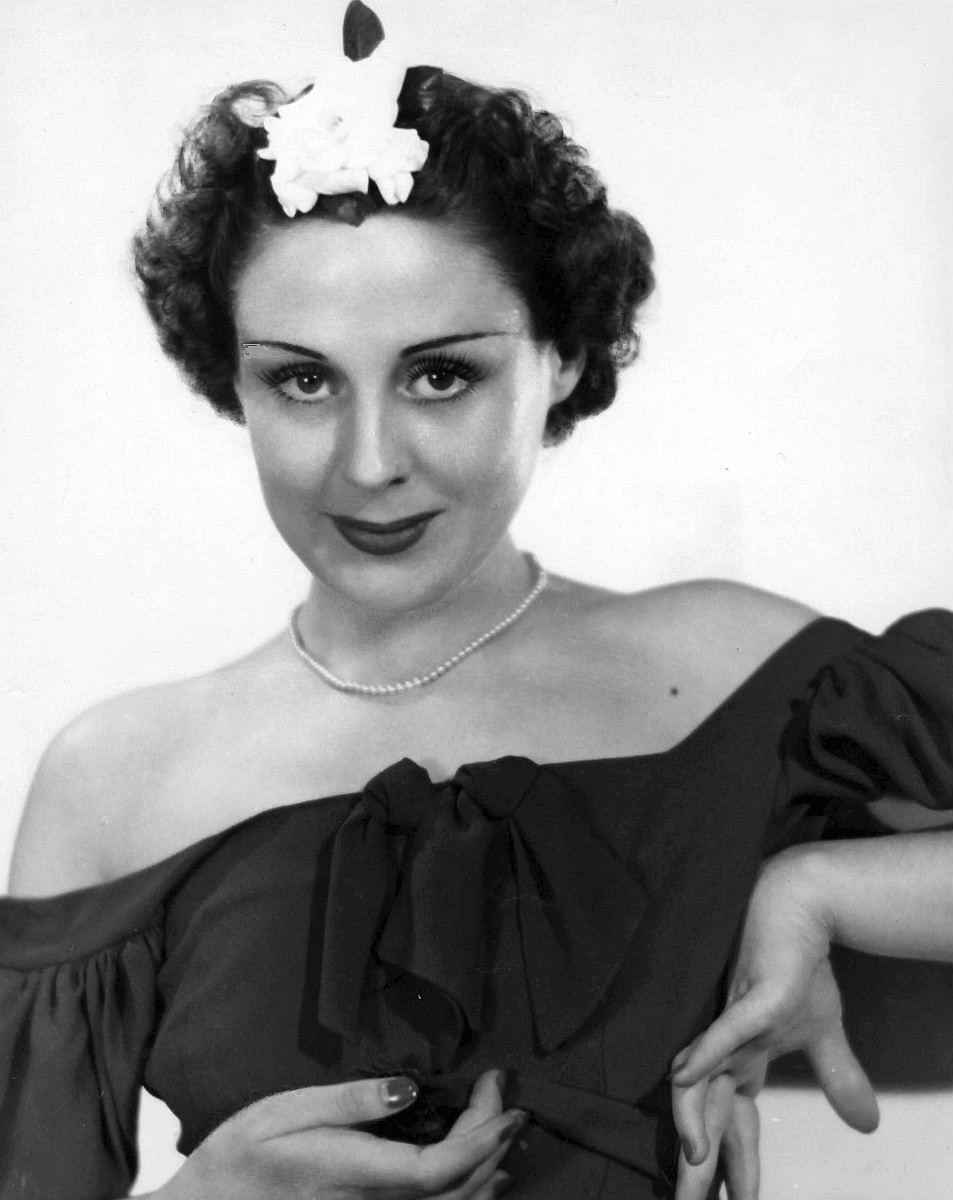
- Vola in a 1937 radio publicity photo.
- Born: Victoria Vola; August 27, 1916; Denver, Colorado, U.S.
- Died: July 21, 1985 (aged 68)
- Occupation: Actress

Victoria Vola (August 27, 1916 – July 21, 1985) was an American actress. She was best known for her portrayal of Edith Miller on both the radio and television runs of Mr. District Attorney.

== Early years ==
Vola was born in Denver, Colorado. Living with an Italian mother and a French father who spoke five languages, she grew up in Denver and was herself fluent in five languages at age 14. She attended a Denver ballet school and studied the violin as a pupil of Hungarian violinist Leopold Auer. She paid for acting lessons by working summer vacations as a grocery store cashier. After appearing in a high school play, she joined a stock company touring in the Denver area. She graduated from a Colorado Springs, Colorado, high school in 1931.

== Early career ==
Vola began a Little Theater, and they presented "A Child Is Born", a Christmas program, on KVOR in 1931. After seeking an audition with a Denver radio station in 1932, she began working on KLZ there in 1933. She acted on Gloria Gale and Doctor Kate on KGO in San Francisco in addition to performing in theater there and in radio and theater in Los Angeles. While in Los Angeles, Vola assembled a company of actors that gained a six-month contract with KFI. That success led to a three-year contract with a syndicator of transcribed radio program to produce religious dramas.

== Life in Hollywood ==
Arriving in Hollywood during the mid-1930s, she was heard on a variety of shows, including The First Nighter Program, Bing Crosby's Kraft Music Hall, Radio Theater, Calling All Cars, Strange as It Seems and the Joe Penner Show. She played opposite Boris Karloff in NBC radio adaptations of Dr. Jekyll and Mr. Hyde and Death Takes a Holiday. During those same years, she appeared on stage in several productions, including Romeo and Juliet. Saturday Murder and White Collars.

She played Carol Manning on Foreign Assignment on Mutual (1943–1944).

== NBC in San Francisco ==
Relocating to San Francisco in 1936, she was heard from NBC's San Francisco studios on such shows as Hal Burdick's Dr. Kate, Winning the West, Junior News and Tales of California. From 1939–40 she had the title role in the daytime drama Brenda Curtis while also appearing in another soap opera, Manhattan Mother. During the 1940s, she was heard in The Adventures of Christopher Wells and as Shanghai Lil on Jungle Jim, plus roles on The Cisco Kid, Yours Truly, Johnny Dollar and The Fat Man.

== Films and television ==
In 1945, she was a narrator for Universal Newsreel. On television, she appeared in Search for Tomorrow, Mr. District Attorney, Armstrong Circle Theatre, Omnibus, Escape (1950) and Love Is a Many Splendored Thing (1970).

== Other professional activities ==
Vola served four consecutive terms as vice president of the New York local of the American Federation of Television and Radio Artists, after which she was elected president of the national organization for 1963-1965.
