= Lee Erwin (organist) =

American theatre organist

- Born: Lee Orville Erwin; July 15, 1908; Huntsville, Alabama
- Died: September 21, 2000 (aged 92)
- Occupation: Theatre organist

Lee Orville Erwin (July 15, 1908 – September 21, 2000) was an American theatre organist who played an important part in a revival of interest in the silent film era. His career began as an organist accompanying first-run silent films in the 1920s. He received classical training in Cincinnati and France, and then began a career as organist and arranger for radio, significantly at WLW and CBS Radio, the latter in association with Arthur Godfrey, that lasted through the mid-1960s. When his radio career ended he was commissioned to provide complete new scores for silent films exceeding seventy in number, and in this capacity and as an organist for silent film tours and exhibitions he received widespread critical acclaim. Erwin was active into his early 90s.

== Biography ==
Lee Orville Erwin was born July 15, 1908, in Huntsville, Alabama. His mother was a church organist for a small congregation, and at age of four Erwin would copy on a toy piano what his mother was playing on a regular instrument. He began formal music training from a local teacher at the same time he entered school. Hooked by both the films and the organs, Erwin developed a habit of regularly attending movie theatres. Both of Huntsville's theatres found out about his abilities as an organist, and at the age of twelve he was playing at both as a substitute and without pay, but it allowed him free entrance. Erwin began performing professionally as a theatre organist while still attending high school in Huntsville. As a pianist he won a state competition for high-schoolers which afforded him a scholarship to the Cincinnati Conservatory of Music, where he enrolled in 1926.

While studying at the conservatory under Parvin Titus, Erwin earned sufficient funds to support himself by continuing to play organ at theatres. After graduating from the conservatory in 1929, his first stop was as assistant organist at Birmingham Alabama's Loew's Temple Theatre and then as primary organist for the Alabama Theatre. There he was greatly influenced by the main organist, Joseph Stoves, whose improvisational abilities and insistence on original composition was to profoundly affect Erwin's approach to film accompaniment. In addition to this theatre work, Erwin earned money by playing piano and organ at radio stations WAPI and WBRC, as well as playing at the First Methodist Church. It was in this period he first took up composing in his spare time.

Erwin was not to stay in Birmingham for long, leaving for Paris, France, in 1930 to study with Nadia Boulanger, André Marchal and significantly with Jean Verd. While in Paris he became assistant organist at the American Cathedral in Paris. His time in Paris finished May 1931 due to lack of funds, and he returned home to Alabama.

Erwin relocated back to Cincinnati in 1932 to become organist at the Albee Theatre in Cincinnati, Ohio. The next year he attained a staff organist position at WLW, where he gained a following on the Moon River program. Erwin also worked other shows at the station including Singin' Sam the Barbasol Man. He returned to theatre work in 1934 when the Paramount Theatre in Cincinnati audience-tested a return of organ music during interludes. Although still employed by WLW, he expanded to arranging and conducting for orchestras in a program entitled "Lee Erwin's Musical Troupe" which aired Sunday evenings on WCKY.

Approximately in 1944 (Note: Erwin's start date at CBS is variously stated as 1943 to 1945. Most sources give 1944.) he was hired by CBS as both an organist, pianist, arranger and composer. He continued as organist at four disparate theatres in the New York City region and played for numerous soap operas on CBS and NBC until the demands on his time with the Arthur Godfrey shows precluded any possibility of other activity. There, he appeared as "Moneybags Erwin" on The Arthur Godfrey Show. As the show's composer, Erwin was often given as little as a single day to create a song based on an idea from Godfrey, but more than one of these songs charted nationally based upon the exposure provided by the show. He married a wealthy lady by the name of Jane Kampf on June 26, 1957, an unexpected event to friends and family, with no known courtship. The marriage lasted a brief few months, and speculation ran that it was an attempt to hide his homosexuality. He soon began a much longer-lasting relationship with his lyricist, Ted Creech, which ended in the early 1970s. As with many other musicians, he found himself out of work in 1966 when the major American networks ceased using staff orchestras.

The next year he was given a commission by the American Theater Organ Society to score the film Queen Kelly for its American premiere. The result was so successful that Erwin spent the next six months, and time intermittently after that, touring with Gloria Swanson while performing his score for the film. The strength of this exhibition led to many subsequent commissions to score and perform for silent films. Thus began a career with silent film where Erwin found himself "doing the same things all over that I did when I was a kid", but this time with distinct advantages in experience and technology. He became instructor of electronic composition and organ performance for Lehman College. His organ tours accompanying silents became highly popular, and though he had previously made a few albums for small and budget labels, in the 1970s he recorded several albums for Angel Records, while at the same time his silent movie organ soundtracks were released by the BBC. In the 1980s he was organist for an annual summer series of silent films at the Cathedral of St. John the Divine in New York City while simultaneously holding a daily job as organist at Carnegie Hall Cinema. He appeared as an organist in the 1987 film Radio Days. That same year Vermont PBS produced a documentary on Erwin's career. His later years were spent on performing tours and a regular circuit of silent film showings. Erwin continued touring until he was 90 years old, when a fall during a performance tour necessitated his retirement. Erwin later suffered an additional fall which broke his hip and prevented him from leaving his apartment in Greenwich Village. As his health deteriorated, he was cared for by life partner Donald Schwing until Erwin's death on September 21, 2000.

== Performance and impact ==
Erwin composed music for many types of silent films, including comedies, melodramas, and epics. His favorite films to score were those of Buster Keaton – he devoted six years to scoring every one of Keaton's silent features. He felt it was important to ignore the original musical scores and re-score the films as the originals were "full of the musical cliches of the '20s", and he wanted the music to lead to appreciation of the film, not "make fun" of it. He commented in 1989 that, contrary to a commonly held concept regarding piano accompaniment of silent films, many theatres had small orchestras to provide music. He sought to provide a similar kind of sound using organs and synthesizers. Despite his classical training, he avoided using classical themes in his scores, finding they distracted from the overall performance. In his second career as a theatre organist he would watch the film on videocasette several times, denoting the exact length of each scene and making his own cue sheet accordingly. His classical training revealed itself in the French harmonies used in his movie compositions. Erwin's international education and compositional faculty helped bridge the cultural chasm between what was considered "serious" organ music and theatre organ music, which had been lightly regarded. Although he carefully composed scores for many silent films, he was noted for a superior improvisational ability which scores were designed to facilitate. Erwin was widely considered the greatest artist of silent film accompaniment and singularly responsible for the genre revival, and has been credited with helping to revive the interest in silent films in general. By the time of his death he had scored in excess of seventy silent films. He was twice named as the American Theatre Organ Society's organist of the year.

In addition to the radio and theatre organ work which brought him popularity, in the 1960s and 1970s Erwin composed experimental electronic classical music classified as "avant-garde" for organ, electronics, or a combination. Musicians who have listed Erwin as a significant influence include Dennis James, David Messineo, Ben Model and Dorothy Papadakos.

== Other activities ==
Erwin obtained a pilot's license in 1940, and regularly flew his own Taylorcraft Aircraft thereafter, a testament to his financially rewarding career at WLW. In the 1950s he listed mathematics and sailing his sloop Aloha as his favorite hobbies. Other activities included acting as president of a music publishing company (Erwin-Howard Music) and a recording firm.

== Partial discography ==
- (1956) – Moon River Music (Zodiac LP-333)
- (1957) – Words and Music of Love – with Tony Marvin (Zodiac Z-1375)
- (1961) – Oldies for Pipe Organ – (Somerset P-12600)
- (1968) – The Sound of the Silents – (Concert Recordings CR-0045)
- (1971) – Lee Erwin Plays Ben Hall's "Little Mother" Wurlitzer – (Concert Recordings CR-0075)
- (1974) – Sound Of Silents – (Angel S-36073)
- (1974) – Rosebud: Marches And Rags Of Scott Joplin & Kerry Mills, Eubie Blake, Harry Guy – (Angel S-36075)
- (1976) – D.W. Griffith – (Angel S-36092)
- (1979) – Moon River Revisited – (OVC-ATOS 34519)

== Notes ==
DJ Premier notably sampled Lee's song 'Thief of Bagdad' in Nas' 'Represent' of his debut album, Illmatic. The sample occurs at 0:54 in the original piece and is interpolated throughout Nas' song.
