= Coastwise =

Coastwise is a play in three acts by Don Mullally and H. A. Archibald. The work premiered on Broadway at the Provincetown Playhouse on November 30, 1931, where it ran for a total of 37 performances. The play is set in a cabin in Northwestern Canada. The original production starred Shirley Booth as Annie Duvall, Richard Stevenson as Alan Farquhar, Lucia Moore as Mrs. Farquhar, Thomas McQuillan as Marty, Priscilla Knowles as Minnie, Charles Gibney as Alec MacDonald, Alexander Campbell as Roberts, and Gordon Hamilton as Nelson.
