= Ed Byron =

American radio and television producer (1904/1905–1964)

Ed Byron (born Edward Armour Byron, October 1905 – November 21, 1964) was an American radio and television producer — "a pioneer in radio dramatic production".

== Biography ==
The oldest of three children born to Armour C. Byron and Cecilia Halloran, Byron was a native of Newport, Kentucky and attended the University of Cincinnati. He was a newspaper reporter for United Press before he began working in radio.

He was a producer at WLW in Cincinnati, Ohio, in the 1930s, and while there he created Moon River, which radio historian John Dunning called "perhaps the best-known, best-loved, best-remembered local show of the network radio era."

Byron became a freelancer in 1935. He created the Mr. District Attorney radio program, which was later adapted for television. He produced and directed the radio version and was one of its writers, but a clause in his contract with Phillips Lord, who owned the rights to the program, limited his on-air credit to co-author.

Byron was called "a stickler for authenticity". For example, when a character was shot in an episode, the location of the bullet wound was specified to the actor or actress because the location would have "a large influence on the victim's speech and general behavior". Dunning described him as "a student of crime, with a library of 5,000 books on the subject". Once a week for more than a decade he dressed like a working man and went to dangerous parts of the city, including rough bars, seeking ideas for stories from "thieves, lackeys, and off-duty cops". He learned more about crime by reading five newspapers daily.

He also produced the radio programs Pot o' Gold, The Adventures of Christopher Wells, Music by Gershwin, and What's My Name?.

During World War II Byron served in the U. S. Army, becoming a major. He reported for duty on February 10, 1943, and was commissioned a captain. When he was radio officer for General Douglas MacArthur he was one of the creators of Radio Guinea, which enabled MacArthur to broadcast during the war.

Byron was president of the New York local of the Radio Directors Guild, and by May 1947 he had become head of the national guild. In the latter role he produced "an unprecedented series of air shows costing about $400,000" to oppose passage of the Taft–Hartley Act.

Byron went to work for NBC in 1960 as an account executive in the special program sales department. He left there in the spring of 1964 to work at ABC on a project "for the restoration of top-grade radio drama". The result was Theatre-Five.

=== Personal life and death ===
In 1931, Byron married Gertrude Dooley, an actress on WLW. He married actress Maxine Jennings on May 17, 1940, in Warrenton, Virginia. At the time of his death, he was married to the former Catherine McCune. He had two sons. He died of cancer on November 21, 1964, in Veterans Hospital in West Haven, Connecticut, aged 59.
