= Girl Missing =

1933 film by Robert Florey

- Movie poster
- Directed by: Robert Florey
- Written by: Carl Erickson; Don Mullally
- Starring: Glenda Farrell; Ben Lyon; Mary Brian
- Cinematography: Arthur L. Todd
- Edited by: Ralph Dawson
- Music by: Leo F. Forbstein
- Production company: Warner Bros. Pictures
- Distributed by: Warner Bros. Pictures
- Release date: March 4, 1933
- Running time: 69 minutes
- Country: United States
- Language: English
- Budget: $107,000

Girl Missing is a 1933 American pre-Code mystery film starring Glenda Farrell, Ben Lyon and Mary Brian. It was directed by Robert Florey and released by Warner Bros. Pictures on March 4, 1933.

Two women stranded in Palm Beach become involved in the case of a new bride who goes missing on her wedding night.

== Plot ==
Kay Curtis and June Dale are two showgirls living in the Palm Beach hotel. When June refuses one of her wealthy male friend's sexual advances, he chooses to let June and Kay pay for their own hotel bills. They decide to ask Daisy Bradford, who is engaged to millionaire Henry Gibson, for help paying the bills because Daisy used to be a fellow showgirl. However, Daisy pretends not to know them. Kay tries to win some money gambling, but ends up losing all their money instead. When they run into Daisy's former boyfriend Raymond Fox in the hotel, he offers them some money to leave town, but June and Kay accidentally miss the train.

Later, Henry and Daisy are married, but Daisy goes missing, and a gangster named Jim Hendricks is found dead in the hotel's garden. Henry offers a large reward to the public for any information about Daisy. Kay and June decide to find Daisy and claim the reward. After Henry, Kay, and June survive a near fatal car accident, Kay suggests that they wreck the car and declare Henry dead from the automobile accident. When Daisy returns to the hotel after Henry's assumed death, she claims that Henry had drugged and kidnapped her and killed Jim Hendricks. However, Kay pulls a gun on Daisy and she confesses that she was going to run away with Raymond, and when Jim Hendricks tried to stop them, Raymond killed him. Raymond and Daisy are arrested by the police, and Henry gives the reward to Kay. Later, Henry decides to marry June, who he has fallen in love with.

== Cast ==
- Glenda Farrell as Kay Curtis
- Ben Lyon as Henry Gibson
- Mary Brian as June Dale
- Lyle Talbot as Raymond Fox
- Guy Kibbee as Kenneth Van Dusen
- Harold Huber as Jim Hendricks
- Edward Ellis as Detective Chief J.T. McDonald
- Peggy Shannon as Daisy Bradford
- Helen Ware as Mrs. Bradford
- Ferdinand Gottschalk as Alvin Bradford
- Walter Brennan as Garage attendant (uncredited)

== Production ==
The film was shot in 13 days with a budget of $107,000. The original working title for the movie was "The Blue Moon Murder Case". Actors Murray Kinnell, Walter Huston and William Powell were considered for the film. And Florence Ryerson was initially assigned to write the script for the movie.

== Reception ==
The New York Times movie review said: "The question of what happened to Peggy Shannon is worrying the principal characters in "Girl Missing", the new film at the Rialto, but the routine and slow-paced quality of the production makes the problem less acute for its audiences. Hidden away in the picture is the material for a lively melodrama which never realizes its full possibilities. The resources that the Warners have summoned to the task of telling this story include a good deal of unintelligent dialogue, feeble direction and an unconvincing arrangement of the narrative. The acting is of no great assistance, either. Ben Lyon plays the wealthy husband, Mary Brian and Glenda Farrell appear as a pair of interested chorus girls and Lyle Talbot enacts the rôle of Daisy's former lover."

== Home media ==
Warner Archive released a double feature DVD collection of Illicit (1931) and Girl Missing (1933) on December 13, 2010.
