= Fashions of 1934 =

1934 film by William Dieterle

- Theatrical release poster
- Directed by: William Dieterle; Busby Berkeley (musical numbers); Stanley Logan (dialogue)
- Written by: Adaptation: Gene Markey; Kathryn Scola
- Screenplay by: F. Hugh Herbert; Carl Erickson
- Story by: Harry Collins; Warren Duff
- Produced by: Henry Blanke (uncredited)
- Starring: William Powell; Bette Davis; Frank McHugh; Hugh Herbert; Verree Teasdale; Reginald Owen
- Cinematography: William Rees
- Edited by: Jack Killifer
- Music by: Sammy Fain (music); Irving Kahal (lyrics)
- Production company: Warner Bros. Pictures
- Distributed by: Warner Bros. Pictures
- Release date: February 14, 1934
- Running time: 78 or 80 minutes
- Country: United States
- Language: English
- Budget: $317,000
- Box office: $965,000

Fashions of 1934 is a 1934 American pre-Code musical comedy film directed by William Dieterle with musical numbers created and directed by Busby Berkeley. The screenplay by F. Hugh Herbert and Carl Erickson was based on the story The Fashion Plate by Harry Collins and Warren Duff. The film stars William Powell, Bette Davis, Frank McHugh, Hugh Herbert, Verree Teasdale, and Reginald Owen, and features Henry O'Neill, Phillip Reed, Gordon Westcott, and Dorothy Burgess. The film's songs are by Sammy Fain (music) and Irving Kahal (lyrics). Sometime after its initial release, the title Fashions of 1934 was changed to Fashions, replacing the original title with an insert card stating "William Powell in 'Fashions'".

== Plot ==
When the Manhattan investment firm of Sherwood Nash goes broke, he joins forces with his partner Snap and fashion designer Lynn Mason to provide discount shops with cheap copies of Paris couture dresses. Lynn discovers that top designer Oscar Baroque gets his inspiration from old costume books, and she begins to create designs the same way, signing each one with the name of an established designer.

Sherwood realizes Baroque's companion, the alleged Grand Duchess Alix, is really Mabel McGuire, his old friend from Hoboken, New Jersey, and threatens to reveal her identity unless she convinces Baroque to design the costumes of a musical revue in which she will star. Baroque buys a supply of ostrich feathers from Sherwood's crony Joe Ward and starts a fashion rage.

Sherwood then opens Maison Elegance, a new Paris fashion house that's a great success until Baroque discovers Lynn is forging his sketches. Baroque has Sherwood arrested, but Sherwood convinces the police to give him time to straighten out the situation. He crashes Baroque and Alix's wedding and promises to humiliate the designer by publicly revealing who his bride really is unless Baroque withdraws the charges. The designer agrees and purchases Maison Elegance from Sherwood, who assures Lynn he'll never get involved in another illegal activity if she returns to America with him.

== Cast ==
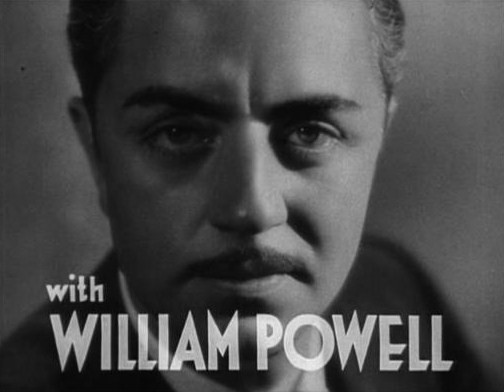
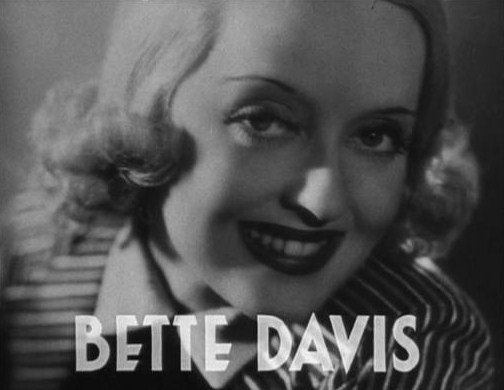
- William Powell as Sherwood Nash
- Bette Davis as Lynn Mason
- Frank McHugh as Snap
- Hugh Herbert as Joe Ward
- Verree Teasdale as Grand Duchess Alix, also known as Mabel
- Reginald Owen as Oscar Baroque
- Henry O'Neill as Duryea
- Phillip Reed as Jimmy Blake
- Gordon Westcott as Harry Brent
- Dorothy Burgess as Glenda
- Etienne Girardot as Glass
- William Burress as Feldman
- Nella Walker as Mrs. Van Tyle
- Spencer Charters as Man removing telephone
- Harry Beresford as Paris bookseller

Cast notes:

- Arthur Treacher, appearing in his fourth Hollywood film, played his first part as a butler, a role he was to play many times in his long career.

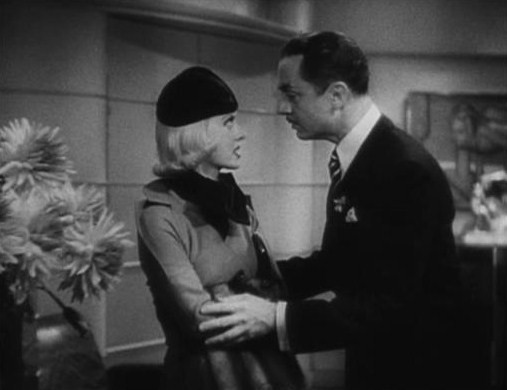
Bette Davis and William Powell; Davis disliked the glamorous look Warner Bros. created for her

== Production ==
With this film, Warner Bros. Pictures chief Jack L. Warner tried to change Bette Davis' screen persona by putting her in a platinum blonde wig and false eyelashes and dressing her in glamorous costumes. The actress, who had been trying to convince the studio head to loan her to RKO so she could portray slatternly waitress Mildred Rogers in Of Human Bondage, was appalled at the transformation, complaining they were trying to turn her into Greta Garbo. In an interview with Photoplay editor Kathryn Dougherty, she complained, "I can't get out of these awful ruts. They just won't take me seriously. Look at me in this picture all done up like a third-rate imitation of the MGM glamour queens. That isn't me. I'll never be a clothes horse or romantic symbol." To Gerald Clarke of Time she lamented, "I looked like somebody dressed up in mother's clothes. But it was a great break because I learned from the experience. I'll never let them do that to me again. Ever!"

Filming took place at Warner Bros.' Burbank studios in 1933, under the working titles King of Fashion and Fashion Follies of 1934. On a copy of the film used in previews, Warners listed writers Gene Markey and Kathryn Scola as having adapted the original story that was the basis of the film, but then later announced that they had nothing to do with the film. As a result of this, the Screen Writers' Guild was asked to take action against the studio.

== Songs ==
The film's musical numbers were staged and directed by Busby Berkeley, and included "Spin a Little Web of Dreams" and "Broken Melody" by Sammy Fain and Irving Kahal, and "Mon Homme (My Man)" by Maurice Yvain, Albert Willemetz and Jacques Charles. Harry Warren wrote the untitled theme that accompanies the fashion show.

== Reception ==
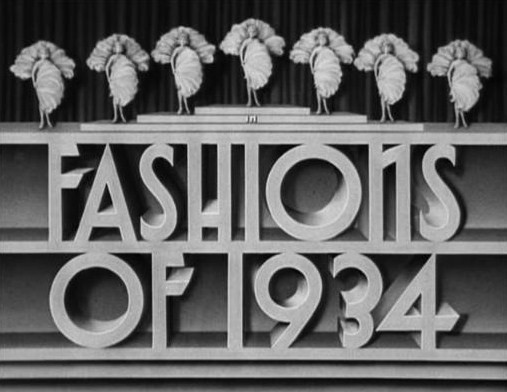
Main title from the original trailer.

=== Box office ===
The film was considered a box office disappointment for Warner Bros. According to their records, it earned $570,000 domestically and $395,000 internationally.

=== Critical reception ===
The New York Times described it as "a brisk show" and added, "The story is lively, the gowns are interesting and the Busby Berkeley spectacles with Hollywood dancing girls are impressive ... William Dieterle, that expert director who has been responsible for several imaginative pictures, does well by this particular production."

Variety called it "a bit far-fetched and inconsistent ... but it has color, flash, dash, class, girls and plenty of clothes ... Just why and how Bette Davis enters the picture never quite rings true."

== See also ==
- National Recovery Administration (NRA), the logo displayed at start of film
