= What's My Name? (radio program) =

American radio game show (1938–1949)

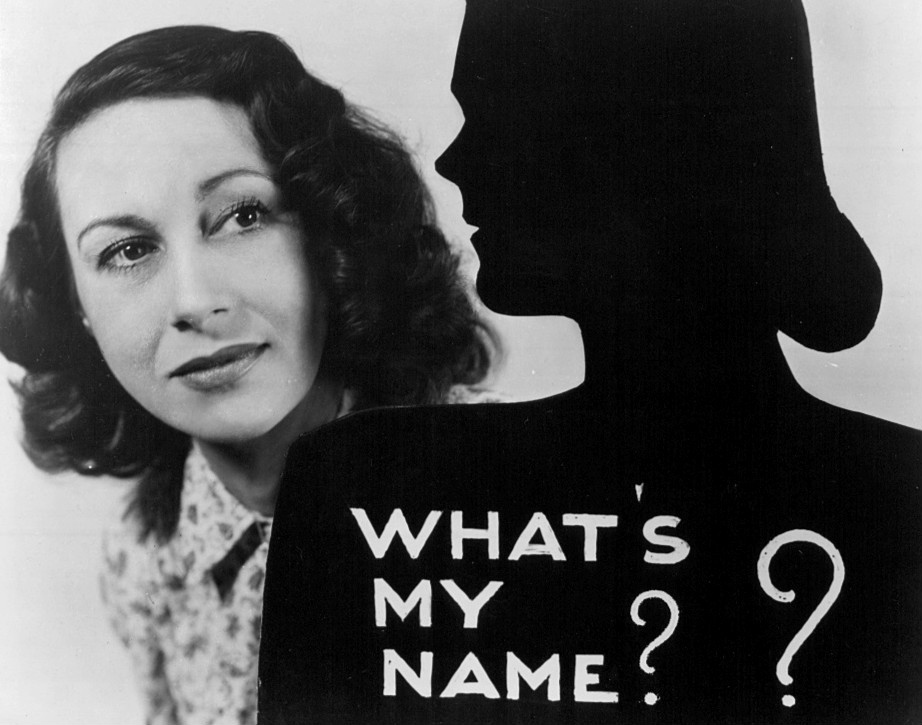
- Promotional photo for the show with Arlene Francis
- Genre: Quiz show
- Running time: 30 minutes
- Country of origin: United States
- Language: English
- Syndicates: Mutual; NBC; ABC
- Hosted by: Arlene Francis
- Produced by: Ed Byron; John Gibbs
- Original release: March 25, 1938 – July 30, 1949
- Sponsored by: Philip Morris; Bristol Myers; Oxydol; Chase and Sanborn; Fleischmann's Yeast; Lydia Grey; General Electric

What's My Name? was a 30-minute radio program in the United States. The program was hosted by Arlene Francis and was among the first radio shows to offer cash prizes to contestants.

== Format ==
Contestants on What's My Name? had to identify a person from a maximum of 10 clues given by the show's two hosts. People to be identified were celebrities and historical characters. In the show's early days, a correct guess on the first clue earned the contestant $10; the amount earned dropped by $1 with each additional clue. In 1948, the top prize was increased to $100, with $50 and $25 prizes, respectively, for identification on the second and third clues.

The program also involved listener participation to some extent, as listeners could send in questions to be used on the air. People who submitted questions received $10 for each question used.

A review of the first episode of What's My Name? offered little hope for its future, calling it "a rather drab show." The reviewer explained: "The program got off to a bad start in that the participants, for the most part, were unable to guess the identities of the characters asked for in the game until long after the listeners got the drift of the proceedings." The reviewer did, however, note that the show was "ably conducted by Bud Hulick and Arlene Francis."

Francis was a constant on What's My Name?, serving as the hostess in all eight of its iterations on radio while her male counterparts changed. Hulick was the host in three versions. Other hosts over the years were Fred Uttal, John Reed King, Ward Wilson and Carl Frank. Harry Salter and his orchestra provided the music.

One source noted that What's My Name? "helped make a broadcasting fixture out of Arlene Francis."

A 1942 review gave What's My Name? a much better evaluation than the earlier review mentioned above. Paul Ackerman wrote in The Billboard, "Name is well produced, moves quickly and manages to maintain an informal atmosphere directly traceable to Miss Francis's and Mr. King's manner with the contestants."

== Background ==
What's My Name? was the brainchild of radio writers Joe Cross and Ed Byron. An August 1940 magazine article related that, after listening to a program called Professor Quiz, "the two of them shut themselves up in a hotel room, vowing they wouldn't come out until they'd thought up a game program that was as much fun as Professor Quiz. What's My Name? was the result."

== Sponsors ==
General Electric sponsored What's My Name? until it left the air. It returned in 1949 with Homemakers Institute and Servel Gas Refrigerator Dealers as sponsors.

== Television ==
A version of What's My Name? was incorporated into the Paul Winchell-Jerry Mahoney Show on television. The program (originally titled The Speidel Show after its sponsor) ran from September 18, 1950, to May 23, 1954.

In the show's early years, each episode began with a comedy skit featuring Winchell and Mahoney. That skit was followed by a quiz segment, What's My Name?, similar to the radio program. The host for the quiz was Ted Brown.

The TV version of the quiz failed to achieve the success of its radio predecessor. A review in The Billboard in August 1951 said:

Speidel has tried hard all season to combine the very accomplished Paul Winchell and Jerry Mahoney team and the former What's My Name? format into a successful stanza. The attempt has failed and, if anything, the talents of the ventriloquist and his little pal have been blunted by misuse."

By 1953, the What's My Name? component of the Paul Winchell-Jerry Mahoney Show had been removed.

== Broadcast schedule ==
| Start date | End date | Network | Day | Time | Sponsor |
|---|---|---|---|---|---|
| March 25, 1938 | March 17, 1939 | Mutual | Friday | 8 p.m. | Philip Morris |
| July 5, 1939 | September 27, 1939 | NBC | Wednesday | 9 p.m. | Bristol-Myers |
| November 4, 1939 | March 1940 | NBC | Saturday | 7 p.m. | Oxydol |
| March 1940 | August 16, 1940 | NBC | Friday | 9:30 p.m. | Oxydol |
| July 6, 1941 | August 31, 1941 | NBC | Sunday | 8 p.m. | Chase & Sanborn |
| January 6, 1942 | June 30, 1942 | Mutual | Tuesday | 8 p.m. | Fleischmann's Yeast |
| February 21, 1943 | June 27, 1943 | NBC | Sunday | 10:30 p.m. | Lydia Grey |
| June 3, 1948 | June 3, 1948 | ABC | Thursday | 9 p.m. | General Electric |
| June 10, 1948 | November 27, 1948 | ABC | Saturday | 9:30 p.m. | General Electric |
| February 5, 1949 | July 30, 1949 | ABC | Saturday | 11:30 a.m. | NA |

Note: "NA"—information was not listed on the cited page.
