= Len Doyle =

American actor

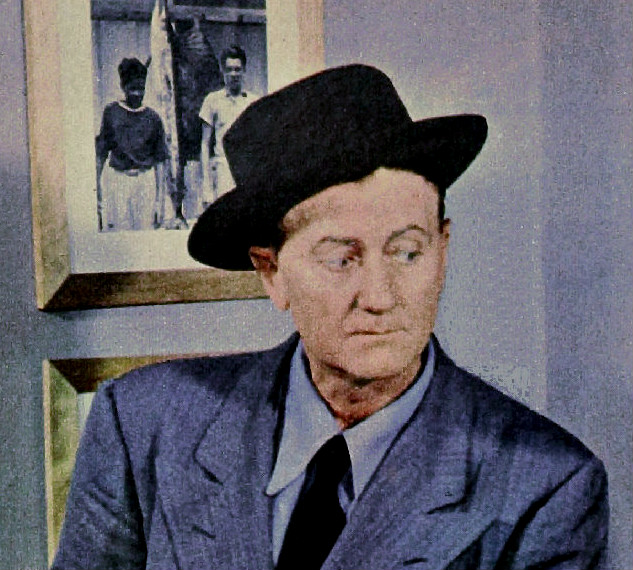
- Doyle as Harrington in Mr. District Attorney in 1947
- Born: February 2, 1893; Toledo, Ohio, U.S.
- Died: December 6, 1959, age 66; Port Jervis, New York, U.S.
- Occupation: Actor
- Spouse: Aggie
- Children: Terry; Lee; Dennis

Len Doyle (February 2, 1893 - December 6, 1959) was an American actor on stage and in old-time radio. He is perhaps best known for playing investigator Harrington on Mr. District Attorney on radio and television.

== Early years ==
Doyle's birthplace was Toledo, Ohio, but when he was young the family moved to Port Jervis, New York. He attended the American Academy of Dramatic Arts.

At one time, Doyle was a professional boxer.

== Radio ==
Doyle played Len Harrington, the investigator for the title character, in Mr. District Attorney. He was in that role for 13 years—all but the first few months of the program's existence.

Although he appeared in many plays and had offers of more starring roles on stage, Doyle said he preferred radio "because it's more fun than the theater and more people hear you".

== Television ==
Doyle carried his role of investigator Harrington from radio to the television version of Mr. District Attorney. The program ran October 1, 1951 - June 23, 1952, on NBC.

== Stage ==
Doyle debuted on stage in The Auctioneer when he was 17, and he acted with Pennsylvania's Lancaster Stock Company. His early theatrical experiences included being "shipwrecked in the waters south of Australia" after a ship carrying an acting troupe was hit by a typhoon. The group was rescued by an Antarctic expedition headed by Admiral Richard E. Byrd.

In the 1930s, he appeared in a number of plays in New York City, including Shadow and Substance, The Time of Your Life, Three Men on a Horse, Night Hawk, Within Four Walls, and Family Upstairs.

When Plan M, with Doyle in the cast, opened at the Belasco Theater February 20, 1942, its schedule included no shows on Wednesdays so that Doyle could continue in his role on Mr. District Attorney on radio. In 1943, he was in a touring company of I'll Take the High Road, which had performances on Wednesdays but used an understudy in Doyle's place so that he could continue with the radio program.

Doyle continued acting in plays in the 1950s, playing the father in The Righteous Are Bold on Broadway in 1955. He also acted with troupes in venues such as the Elitch Gardens Theater in Colorado.

== Personal life ==
Doyle and his wife, Aggie, were married "in a little New Jersey town" in August 1937. They had three children, Terry, Lee, and Dennis.

Doyle was described as "a tough, resourceful man in real life". He was "an avid hunter and fisherman". A 1939 newspaper article reported: "He has been Broadway's demon deer stalker for the last 15 years. Goes up every Fall to Sullivan County and always gets his buck." During World War II, he used his own yacht to patrol part of the Atlantic coast for the United States Coast Guard Auxiliary.

== Death ==
Doyle died December 6, 1959, in Port Jervis, New York, while he was on a hunting trip. He was 66.
