= Laff That Off =

Play by Dan Mullally

Laff That Off is a play in three acts by Don Mullally. It premiered on Broadway at Wallack's Theatre on November 2, 1925. It moved to the 39th Street Theatre midway through its Broadway run in December 1925. It closed in June 1926 after 263 performances. Produced by Earl Carroll and directed by Roy Walling, the play starred Thomas W. Ross as Robt. Elton Morse, a.k.a. "Remorse" and Pauline Drake as Emmy, a.k.a. "Mopupus". Others in the cast included Wyrley Birch as Mike Connelly, Shirley Booth as Peggy Bryant, Alan Bunce as Leo Mitchell, Hattie Foley as Mrs. Connelly, and Norval Keedwell as Arthur Lindau.
