= Brenda Curtis =

American radio soap opera (1939–1940)

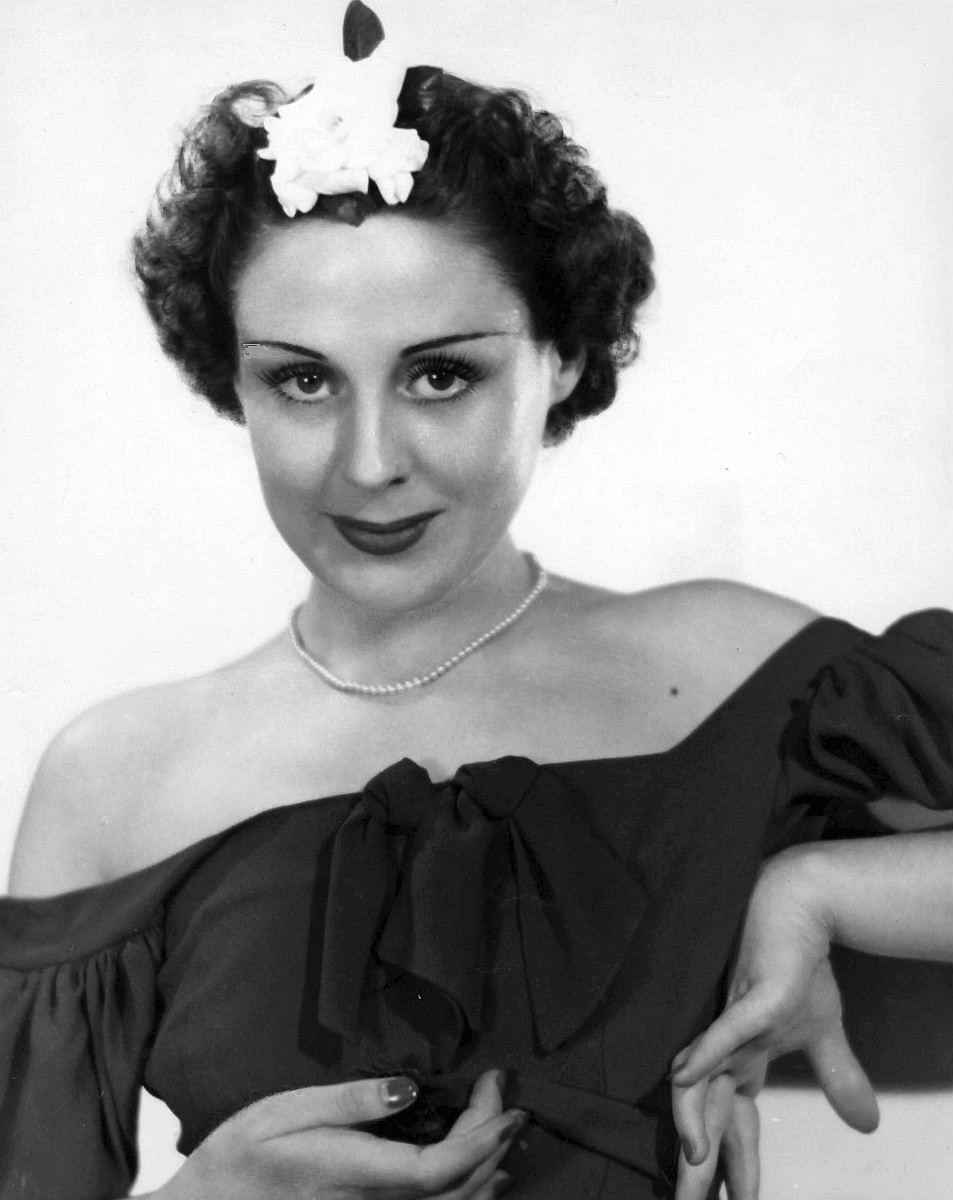
- Brenda Curtis star Vicki Vola
- Genre: Soap opera
- Running time: 15 minutes
- Country of origin: United States
- Language: English
- Syndicates: CBS
- Starring: Vicki Vola
- Announcer: Ken Roberts
- Written by: Lee Gebhart
- Produced by: Diana Bourbon
- Original release: September 11, 1939 – January 19, 1940
- Opening theme: Melody in F
- Sponsored by: Campbell Soups

Brenda Curtis is an old-time radio soap opera in the United States. It was broadcast on CBS from September 11, 1939 to January 19, 1940.

== Premise ==
The A to Z of American Radio Soap Operas, by Jim Cox, summarized the plot line of the program as follows: "Brenda Curtis was a promising actress who relinquished her career to be a homemaker in New York City. Domestic troubles included the downturn of her husband Jim's law practice." The couple had been married five years and had a 4-year-old daughter.

The 15-minute program was heard on weekdays and was sponsored by Campbell Soups.

== Personnel ==
Characters in Brenda Curtis and the actors who portrayed them are shown in the table below.

Character	Actor
Brenda Curtis	Vicki Vola
Jim Curtis	Michael Fitzmaurice; Hugh Marlowe
Myra Belden	Helen Choate
Brenda's mother	Agnes Moorehead
Stacey Gordon	Matt Crowley
Ziggy Bernstein	Charles Cantor
Cleo	Ann Elsner; Juanita Hall
Peggy Curtis	Margaret R. Lipper
Gloria Bennett	Kathleen Niday
Judge Harmon	Parker Fennelly

Source: Radio Programs, 1924-1984: A Catalog of More Than 1800 Shows except as noted.

Ken Roberts was the announcer. Lew White and George Heninger provided the music. Lee Gebhart was the writer, and Diana Bourbon was the producer.
