= Jay Jostyn =

American radio actor (1901–1976)

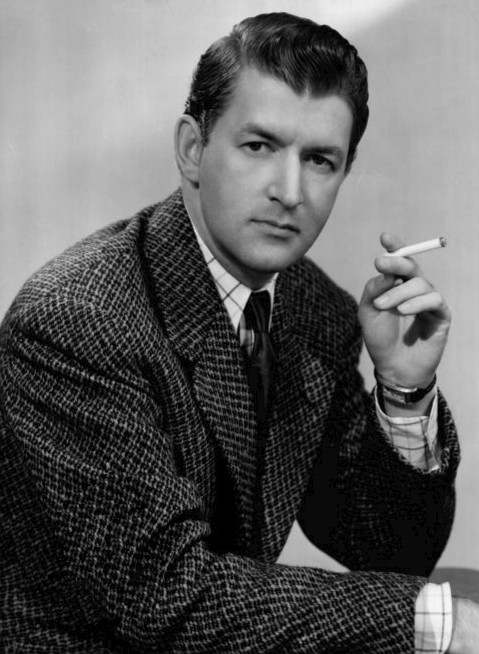
- Jostyn in 1939
- Born: Eugene Josten; December 13, 1901; Milwaukee, Wisconsin
- Died: June 25, 1976 (aged 74); Los Angeles, California
- Education: Wisconsin Conservatory of Music
- Occupation: Actor
- Known for: Portraying the title role in Mr. District Attorney on radio
- Spouse: Ruth Hill (1928– ?)
- Children: 2

Jay Jostyn (December 13, 1901 – June 25, 1976) was an actor in the era of old-time radio. He is best known for portraying the title role in Mr. District Attorney on radio. An article in Radio-TV Mirror in 1952 reported, "He is so generally believed to be a real life lawyer that he frequently receives mail from listeners inviting him to move to certain cities where they feel crimes are going unsolved."

== Early years ==
Jostyn was born Eugene Josten, the son of George and Mary Josten of Milwaukee, Wisconsin. He attended St. Joseph's parochial school, Marquette Academy, Marquette University, and the Wisconsin Conservatory of Music.

Before going into acting full-time, he had a job with a telephone company.

== Stage ==
In 1948, Jostyn had the lead in a touring company that performed The Trial of Mary Dugan. On Broadway, he played District Attorney McDonough in Deadfall (1955).

== Radio ==
Jostyn's career in radio began at WLW in Cincinnati, Ohio, when he was the first poetry reader for the station's late-night Moon River program.

Jostyn's roles as a regular cast member included those shown in the table below.

Program	Role
Foreign Assignment	Brian Barry
Hilltop House	Frank Klabber
The Life of Mary Sothern	Max Tilley
Listen Carefully	Master of ceremonies
Mr. District Attorney	District Attorney
Our Gal Sunday	Jackie
The Parker Family	Walter Parker
Popeye, The Sailor	Captain Dick
Second Husband	Ben Porter
This Day Is Ours	Curt Curtis.

Jostyn was also in the casts of This Small Town, Silver Theater, The Top Guy, and Mystery Man.

== Television ==
Jostyn's roles as a regular cast member included those show in the table below.

Program	Role	Notes
Mr. District Attorney	Paul Garrett	
Night Court U.S.A.	The Judge	
The Secret Storm	Dr. Hadley	
Alfred Hitchcock Presents	Morgan	Season 4 Episode 3: "The Jokester" (1958)

Jostyn also starred in Night Court U.S.A. a syndicated series that dramatized actual court cases. Additionally, he was also seen in episodes of The Doctor, and The Philco Television Playhouse.

== Other professional activities ==
In November 1943, Jostyn was elected to a one-year term as third vice-president of the New York local of the American Federation of Radio Artists. In 1944, he was one of seven people elected to AFRA's national board.

== Personal life ==
On October 17, 1928, Jostyn married Ruth Hill in Pasadena, California. She was an actress whom he met when they performed together in a play. They had two sons, Jean Charles and Jon George.

== Death ==
Jostyn died June 25, 1976, in Los Angeles, California.
