= Carl Erickson (screenwriter) =

American screenwriter

- Born: April 7, 1908; South Manchester, Connecticut, USA
- Died: August 29, 1935 (aged 27); Burbank, California, USA
- Occupation: Screen Writer

Carl Erickson (1908–1935) was a film writer.

Erickson was the son of Swedish immigrants, Albert and Ellen Erickson. He grew up in New Haven, Connecticut, where his father worked at the New Haven Wire Mill company. He lived in Michigan before coming to California, where he worked for as a writer for Warner Bros., joining during Darryl F. Zanuck's era.

Erickson wrote for films including Stranger in Town (1932), Fashions of 1934, and Black Fury (1935).

He committed suicide in 1935. Domestic troubles were said to be a contributing factor. His wife had established residency in Nevada and was pursuing a divorce.

== Filmography ==
- Stranger in Town (1932) (based on the story: "Competition" by) / (screen play)
- Silver Dollar (1932) (screen play)
- Mystery of the Wax Museum (1933) (screen play)
- Girl Missing (1933) (adaptation) / (original story)
- Easy to Love (1934) (adaptation) / (screen play)
- Fashions of 1934 (1934) (screen play)
- Smarty (1934) (screen play)
- Sweet Music (1935) (screenplay)
- Black Fury (1935) (screen play)
- Stranded (1935) (additional dialogue)
