= The Desert Flower (film) =

1925 film

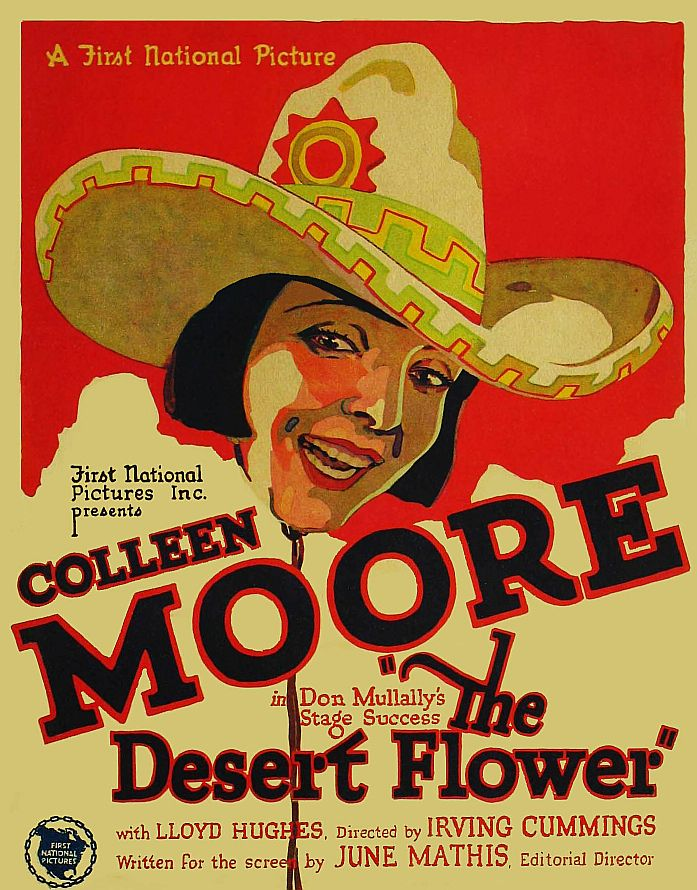
- Theatrical release poster
- Directed by: Irving Cummings
- Screenplay by: June Mathis
- Based on: The Desert Flower by Don Mullally
- Starring: Colleen Moore; Lloyd Hughes; Kate Price; Gino Corrado; Fred Warren; Frank Brownlee
- Cinematography: Ted McCord
- Edited by: George McGuire
- Production company: First National Pictures
- Distributed by: First National Pictures
- Release date: June 21, 1925
- Running time: 70 minutes
- Country: United States
- Languages: Silent; English intertitles

The Desert Flower is a 1925 American silent Western film directed by Irving Cummings and written by June Mathis. It is based on the 1924 play The Desert Flower by Don Mullally. The film stars Colleen Moore, Lloyd Hughes, Kate Price, Gino Corrado, Fred Warren, and Frank Brownlee. The film was released on June 21, 1925, by First National Pictures.

== Plot ==
As described in a film magazine review, Maggie Fortune, left motherless in her box car home in the West, meets the dissipated Rance Conway, son of a wealthy New Yorker who has turned him out. She is taught to read as she attempts to reform him. Her stepfather Mike Dyer admires her, but after a struggle with him she runs away with her little sister to Bull Frog, a new mining town. With the first money she earns in the dance hall there, she sends the baby to a nursing home in San Francisco, and proceeds to make a man out of Rance, whom she now deeply loves. She taunts Rance in a new attempt to make a man out of him, and grub stakes him. He returns, having conquered his desire for drink. He has found a gold mine for which $10,000 has been offered, just as Dyer has located Maggie. Dyer has almost overpowered Maggie when a gunshot is fired and he apparently drops dead. Maggie, Rance, and José Lee each claim that they fired the shot. Dyer however is only wounded. Rance takes Maggie on a honeymoon to his home in New York.

== Cast ==
- Colleen Moore as Maggie Fortune
- Lloyd Hughes as Rance Conway
- Kate Price as Mrs. McQuade
- Gino Corrado as José Lee
- Fred Warren as Dizzy
- Frank Brownlee as Mike Dyer
- Isabelle Keith as Inga Hulverson
- Anna Mae Walthall as Flozella
- William Bailey as Jack Royal
- Monte Collins as Mr. McQuade
- Ena Gregory as Fay Knight

== Production ==
During production, Colleen Moore fell and injured her vertebra, thus resulting in her being placed in a cast for six weeks and delaying production. This was the third of five films, in three years, with Moore and Hughes starring in the lead roles. They also appeared together in The Huntress (1923), Sally (1925), Irene (1926), and Ella Cinders (1926).

== Censorship ==
Before The Desert Flower could be released in Kansas, the Kansas Board of Review required the removal of three scenes where Mrs. McQuade is at the bar.

== Preservation ==
In February of 2021, The Desert Flower was cited by the National Film Preservation Board on their Lost U.S. Silent Feature Films list and is therefore presumed lost.

=== Images ===
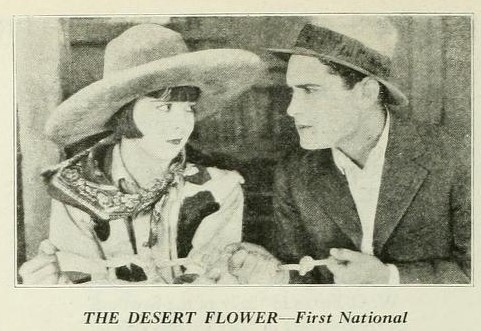
Colleen Moore, left and Lloyd Hughes, right

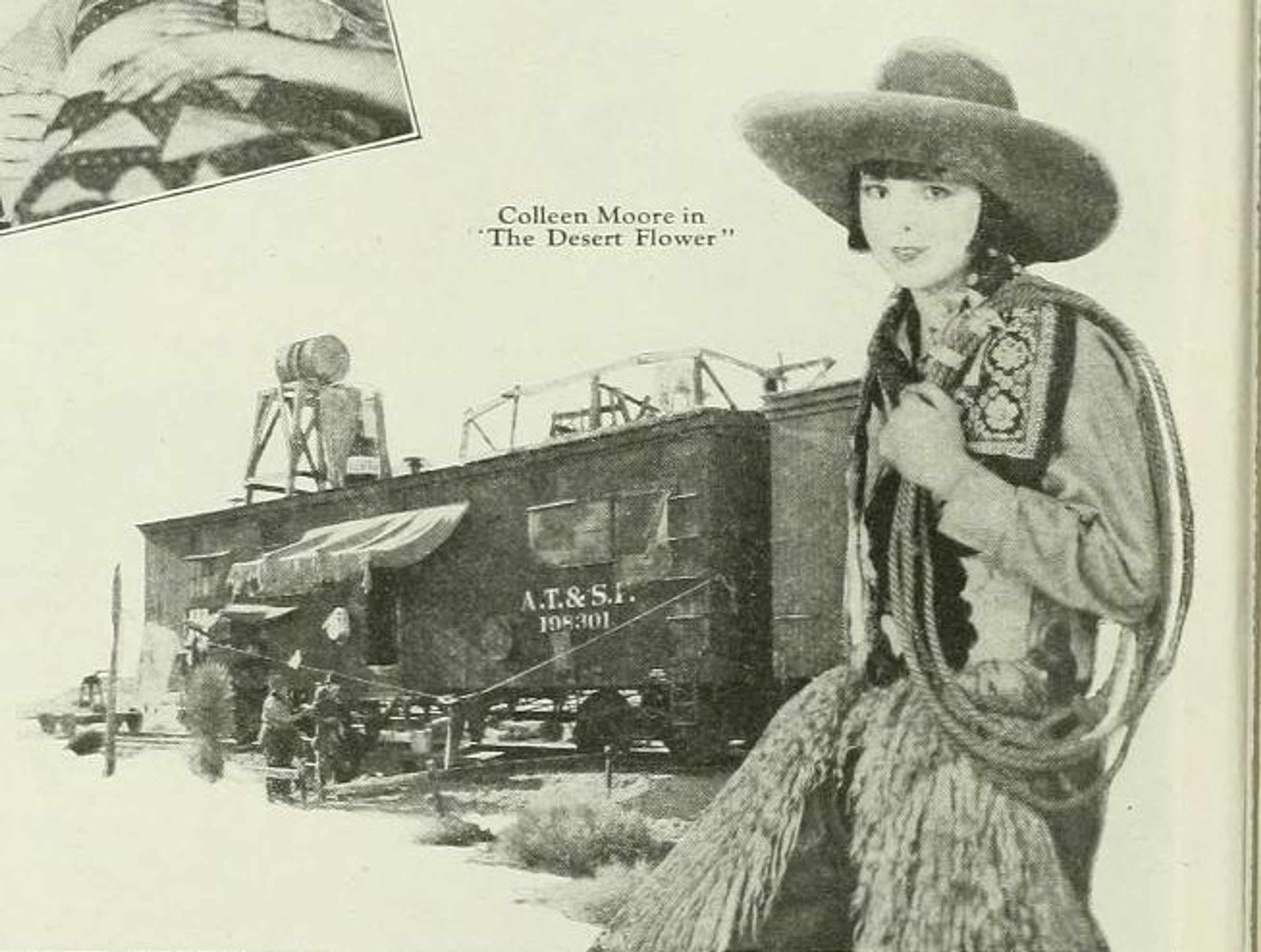
Colleen Moore in an ad for the film

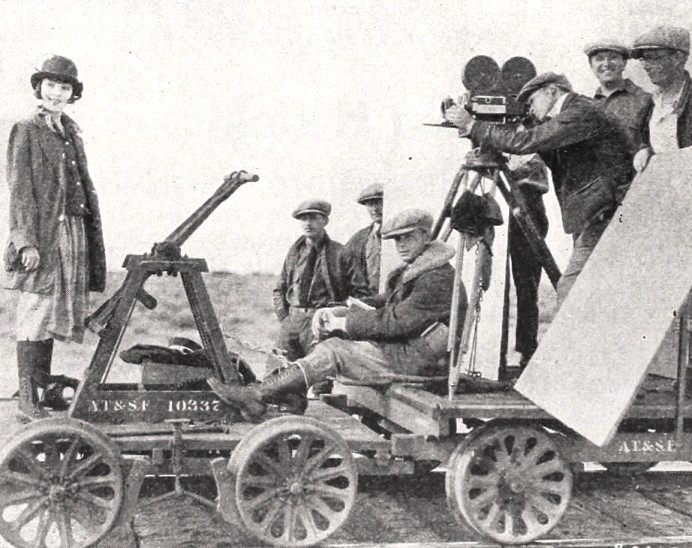
Colleen Moore and the film crew

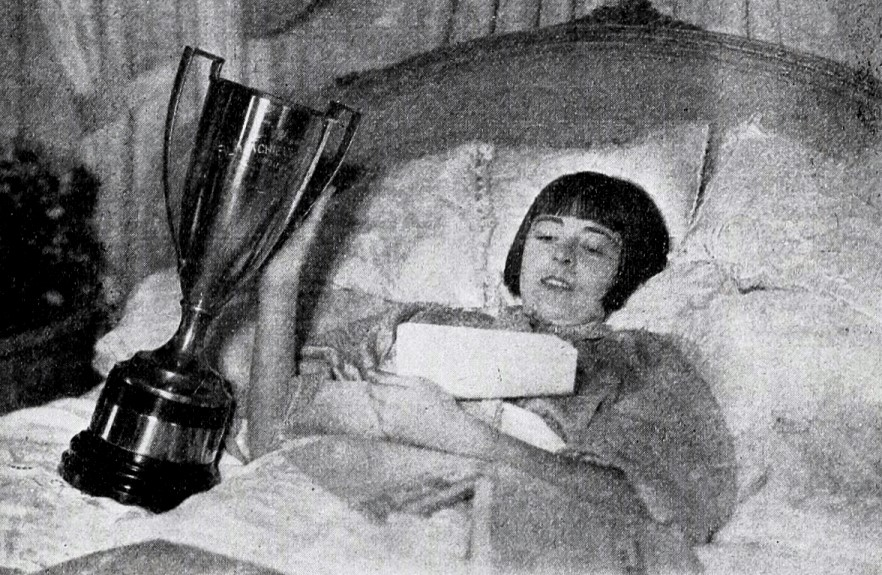
Colleen Moore recovering from her injured vertebra

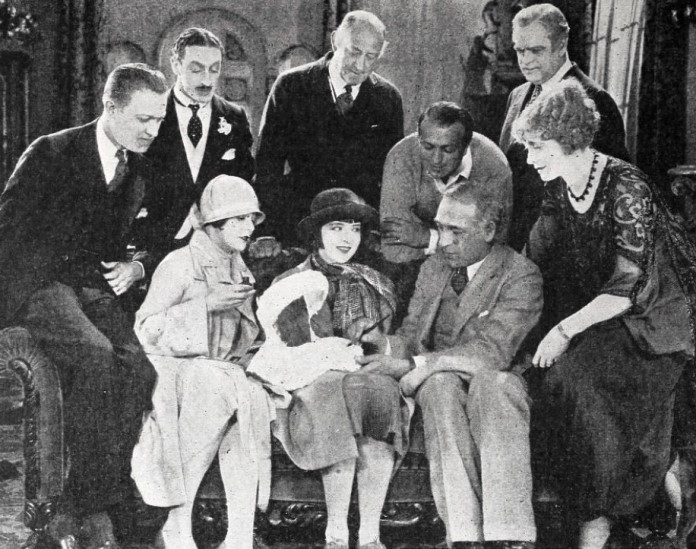
Colleen Moore with her body cast after recovering
