= Warren B. Duff =

American film producer (1904–1973)

- Born: May 17, 1904; San Francisco, California, U.S.
- Died: August 5, 1973 (aged 69); Los Angeles, California, U.S.
- Occupation: Film producer
- Years active: 1931–1972

Warren Duff (May 17, 1904 – August 5, 1973) was a film and television writer and producer.

As a writer, Duff wrote for films including, Fashions of 1934, Angels with Dirty Faces (1938), Experiment Perilous (1944), Step Lively (1944), Chicago Deadline (1949), Appointment with Danger (1951) and The Turning Point (1952).

He worked on television programs including The Rogues (1965), The Invaders (1967) and Mannix (1967).

Duff, the producer of the film noir classic Out of the Past (1947), was once an actor and director on the New York City stage before turning to screenwriting when he entered the film business in 1931. He died of cancer in 1973.

== Accolades ==
Nomination

- Edgar Allan Poe Awards: Edgar, Best Motion Picture, for Chicago Deadline (1949); shared with: Tiffany Thayer; 1950.

== Selected filmography ==
- Stage Struck (1936)
- Each Dawn I Die (1939)
- The Lady from Cheyenne (1941)
- Gambling House (1951)
- Make Haste to Live (1954)
