= Don Mullally =

American playwright, screenwriter, theatre director and actor

Don Hiram Mullally (27 April 1886 in St. Louis, Missouri – 1 April 1933 in Duarte, California) was an American playwright, screenwriter, theatre director, and actor. He penned several plays which were staged on Broadway, beginning with Conscience in 1924. His play The Desert Flower (1924) was adapted into a film in 1925. He also directed many of his own plays on Broadway as well as works by other writers. He wrote the screenplays to three Hollywood films released in 1933, the year that he died. One of these films, Mystery of the Wax Museum, was an important early horror film.

== Career ==
Don Mullally was born in Saint Louis, Missouri into a family of actors. He started writing plays in 1918 in his native city. He worked as performer in vaudeville and on the legitimate stage prior to his career as a playwright and director in New York City. In 1921 he formed a stage partnership with the actor Roy Walling. The pair attempted to stage works written by Mullally but without much success.

Mullally's breakthrough came in 1924 when his play Conscience was staged at Broadway's Belmont Theatre. The work was initially scheduled to premiere Off-Broadway at the Cherry Lane Theatre, but a chance meeting between Roy Walling and Broadway producer A. H. Woods led to the latter attending rehearsals and deciding to produce the play on Broadway instead. The play was a tremendous success for the dramatic actress Lillian Foster (died 1949), and the role launched her career.

Mullally's The Desert Flower was also staged on Broadway in 1924, and it was adapted into the 1925 film The Desert Flower. His other Broadway plays include Laff That Off (1925), Wanted (1928), The Camels Are Coming (1931), and Coastwise (1931). He also penned several plays which never made it to Broadway, including Maggie which premiered in Baltimore in 1924. The Federal Theatre Project staged a revival of his play Laff That Off in 1936.

In addition to writing his plays, Mullally often directed them as well. He directed the Broadway productions of Wanted, The Camels Are Coming and Coastwise. He also directed works by other writers on Broadway, including Michael Grismaijer's The Noble Experiment (1930), Preston Sturges's Recapture (1930), and Fanny Hatton and Frederic Hatton's Love, Honor and Betray (1930). He also founded and ran an experimental theatre in Woodstock, New York which was active in the 1920s and early 1930s.

In July 1932, Mullally left New York City for California to pursue a career as a contracted scriptwriter for Warner Brothers. With the screenwriter Carl Erickson, he co-authored the screenplay to Girl Missing (1933, originally titled The Blue Moon Murder Mystery), and the 1933 pre-Code mystery-horror film Mystery of the Wax Museum. The latter film was an important early film in the horror genre and has been re-adapted several times. He also co-authored the screenplay to another 1933 film, She Had To Say Yes, this time with writer Rian James.

== Death ==
In January 1933 Mullally entered a tuberculosis sanatorium in Duarte, California. He died there at the age of 46 on April 1, 1933.
