= Mr. District Attorney =

Radio, television, and comic book crime drama series

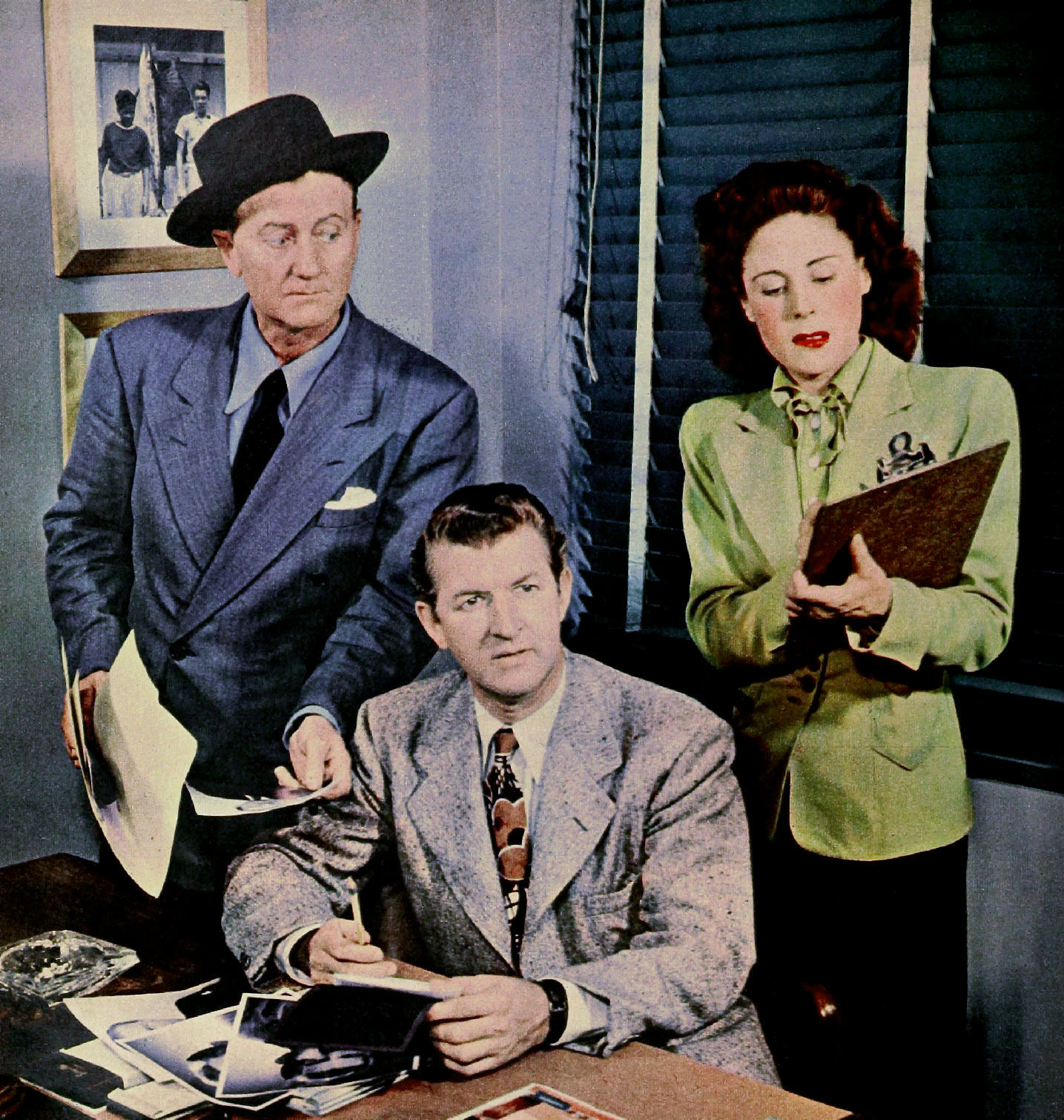
- The cast in 1947. From left: Len Doyle (Harrington), Jay Jostyn (the District Attorney), and Vicki Vola (Edith Miller)
- Genre: Crime drama
- Running time: 30 minutes
- Country of origin: United States
- Language: English
- Syndicates: NBC Blue; NBC Red; ABC
- Starring: Vicki Vola; Dwight Weist; Raymond Edward Johnson; Jay Jostyn
- Announcer: Ed Herlihy; Mark Hawley; Fred Uttal
- Created by: Ed Byron
- Written by: Bob Shaw
- Directed by: Ed Byron
- Produced by: Phillips H. Lord

Mr. District Attorney is a radio crime drama produced by Samuel Bischoff that aired on NBC and ABC from April 3, 1939, to June 13, 1952 (and in transcribed syndication through 1953). The series focused on a crusading district attorney initially known only as Mister District Attorney or Chief, and was later translated to television. On television, the attorney's name was Paul Garrett, and the radio version adopted the name in its final years when David Brian played the role. A key figure in the dramas was secretary Edith Miller.

== History ==
Created, written, and directed by former law student Ed Byron, the series was inspired by the early years of New York governor Thomas E. Dewey. Dewey's public war against racketeering led to his election as governor. Phillips H. Lord, creator of Gang Busters, helped to develop the concept and coined the title. Byron lent an air of accuracy and immediacy to his scripts through close study of crime statistics, a library of criminology texts, following the newspapers and even visiting rough bars to gain tips, background and color from crooks and police.

Produced throughout its run in New York City, the series began as a 15-minute serial, becoming a half-hour, self-contained series three months later as a summer replacement for The Bob Hope Show on June 27, 1939. During 1942, Mr. District Attorney began battling Nazis, leading to conflicts with the FBI when the scripts reflected life too closely.

In December 1949, Mr. District Attorney returned to live broadcasts after 13 weeks of using tape-recorded transcriptions.

The program was sponsored by Bristol-Myers. Writers included Finis Farr.

Episodes included "The Case of the Overly-Fond Husband" on January 30, 1946.

== Cast and characters ==
- Mr. District Attorney – the nameless title role was played by several actors throughout the series:
  - Dwight Weist (1939 serials)
  - Raymond Edward Johnson (1939 half-hour shows)
  - Jay Jostyn (1940 through 1952; Jostyn also guest-starred in the role in mystery sketches for the game show Quick as a Flash)
  - Tony Randall served as a replacement for Jostyn during the 1940s, because, in his words, he performed "a good Jay Jostyn impression".
  - David Brian (1952–1953 syndication)
- Voice of the Law – the show's signature was the opening announcer known as the Voice of the Law, who defined the creed and duties of Mr. District Attorney. The role was played by Maurice Franklin and also Jay Jostyn prior to taking the lead role.
- Edith Miller – the district attorney's faithful secretary, played throughout the series run by Vicki Vola.
- Miss Rand – the D.A.'s receptionist was played by Eleanor Silver and Arlene Francis.
- Len Harrington – the D.A.'s chief investigator, a former cop, was played by Walter Kinsella, who had been heard in various police roles during the early years, and by Len Doyle from 1940 onward.
- Other supporting players and guests on the series included such noted actors as Paul Stewart and Frank Lovejoy.
- Harry Salter conducted the music.

== Film ==
In three films released by Republic Pictures in the early 1940s, the district attorney was named P. Cadwallader Jones and was assisted by journalist Terry Parker. Different actors portrayed them in each film. The trilogy consisted of Mr. District Attorney (1941) starring Dennis O'Keefe with Florence Rice and Peter Lorre, Mr. District Attorney in the Carter Case (1941) starring James Ellison and Virginia Gilmore and Secrets of the Underground (1942) starring John Hubbard and Virginia Grey.

A fourth film again titled Mr. District Attorney was released by Columbia Pictures in 1947. O'Keefe returned as the lead, now named Steve Bennett.

== Television ==
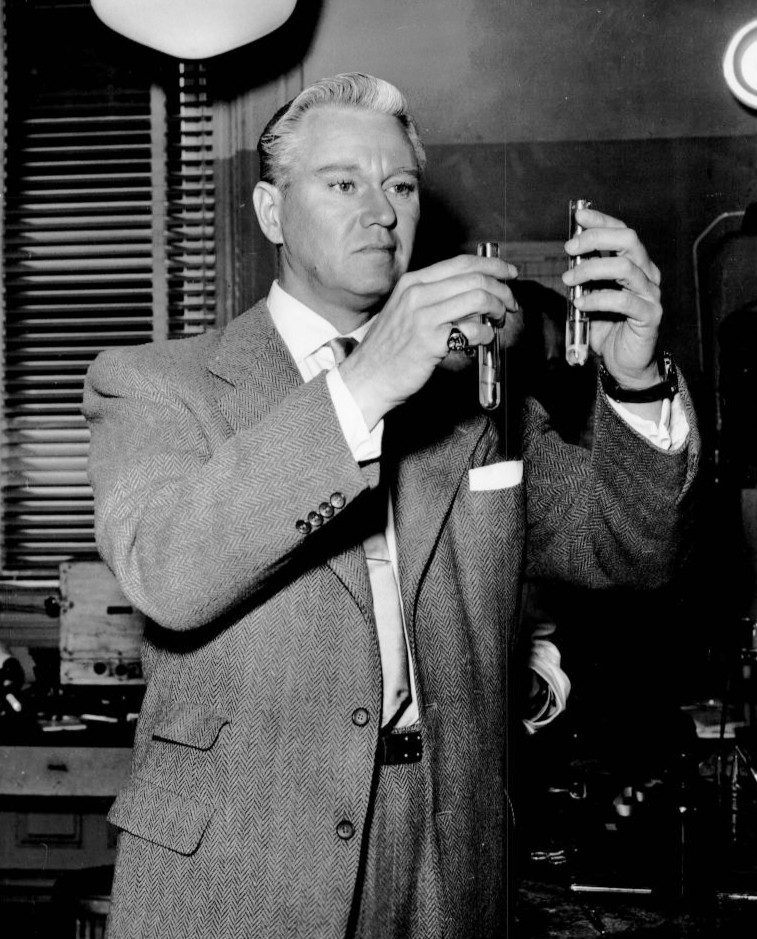
David Brian in the title role, 1954.

Near the end of the radio run, the series was transferred to television. The first incarnation ran on ABC from October 1, 1951 through June 23, 1952 on alternate Mondays, first with The Amazing Mr. Malone and then Out of the Fog. The radio cast reprised their roles, with Jay Jostyn as Mr. District Attorney, Vicki Vola as Miss Miller and Len Doyle as Harrington.

=== Season 1 (1951–52) ===
No. overall	No. in season	Title	Directed by	Written by	Original release date
1	1	"The Case of the Homecoming"	Wes McKee	Story by : Teleplay by :	October 1, 1951
2	2	"The Case of the Bindle Boy"	Unknown	Story by : Teleplay by :	October 15, 1951
3	3	"The Case of the Cop-Killer"	Unknown	Robert J. Shaw	October 29, 1951
4	4	"The Case of the Bird Brain"	Unknown	Story by : Teleplay by :	November 12, 1951
5	5	"The Case of the Dangerous Clown"	Unknown	Story by : Teleplay by :	November 26, 1951
6	6	"The Case of the Silent Victim"	Unknown	Story by : Teleplay by :	December 10, 1951
7	7	"The Case of the Crooked Finger"	Unknown	Story by : Teleplay by :	December 24, 1951
8	8	"The Case of the Big Day"	Unknown	Story by : Teleplay by :	January 7, 1952
9	9	"The Case of the Three Ravens"	Edward Byron	Story by : Teleplay by :	January 21, 1952
10	10	"The Case of All But Two"	Unknown	Story by : Teleplay by :	February 4, 1952
11	11	"The Case of the Rain-Check"	Unknown	Story by : Teleplay by :	February 18, 1952
12	12	"The Case of the Powder Keg"	Unknown	Story by : Teleplay by :	March 3, 1952
13	13	"The Case of the Golden Square"	Unknown	Story by : Teleplay by :	March 17, 1952
14	14	"The Case of the Beetle"	Unknown	Story by : Teleplay by :	March 31, 1952
15	15	"The Case of the Grand Old Man"	Unknown	Story by : Teleplay by :	April 14, 1952
16	16	"The Case of the Bag-Man"	Unknown	Story by : Teleplay by :	April 28, 1952
17	17	"The Case of the Promise"	Unknown	Story by : Teleplay by :	May 12, 1952
18	18	"The Case of the Junk Man"	Unknown	Robert J. Shaw	May 26, 1952
19	19	"The Case of the Empty House"	Unknown	Robert J. Shaw	June 9, 1952
20	20	"The Case of the High Note"	Unknown	Story by : Teleplay by :	June 23, 1952

=== 1954 revival ===
In 1954, the show was revived in syndication by Ziv Television Programs, which had also handled the 1952–1953 radio syndication. David Brian reprised his role from that series but the D. A. was named Paul Garrett. Jackie Loughery played Miss Miller. Ziv sold the program to Radio Diffusion Francaise for broadcast in Europe with a subsidiary, Ziv International of France, overseeing dubbing into French.

=== Season 1 (1954) ===
No. overall	No. in season	Title	Directed by	Written by	Original release date
1	1	"Fire Insurance"	Herbert L. Strock	Story by : Teleplay by : Richard G. Taylor	1954
2	2	"Hit and Run"	Leon Benson	Story by : Teleplay by : Stuart Jerome	1954
3	3	"Numbers"	Leon Benson	Story by : Teleplay by : Ellis Marcus	1954
4	4	"Wife Killer"	Henry Kesler	Story by : Teleplay by : Gene Roddenberry	1954
5	5	"The Art Forger"	Henry Kesler	Story by : Teleplay by : John Larkin	1954
6	6	"Bad Cop"	Greg Garrison	Story by : Teleplay by : R.G. Taylor	1954
7	7	"Blow-Up"	Leon Benson	Story by : Teleplay by : Rik Vollaerts	1954
8	8	"College Story"	Henry Kesler	Story by : Teleplay by : Frank Moss and Lee Berg	1954
9	9	"Court Escape"	Henry Kesler	Story by : Teleplay by : Gene Roddenberry	1954
10	10	"Court Room"	Leigh Jason	Story by : Teleplay by : Arthur Orloff & R.G. Taylor	1954
11	11	"D.A. Killer"	Herbert Strock	Story by : Teleplay by : Rik Vollaerts	1954
12	12	"Gambling (aka Defense Plant Gambling)"	Leigh Jason	Story by : Teleplay by : Gene Roddenberry	1954
13	13	"Hi-Jack"	Tim Whelan	Story by : Teleplay by : Robert Libott, Stuart Jerome, & Donn Mullally	1954
14	14	"Juvenile Gang"	Leigh Jason	Story by : Teleplay by : Ellis Marcus	1954
15	15	"Narcotics"	Herbert Strock	Story by : Teleplay by : Ellis Marcus	1954
16	16	"No Parole"	Leon Benson	Story by : Teleplay by : Donn Mullally	1954
17	17	"Planned Murder"	Leon Benson	Story by : Teleplay by : Don Martin & Donn Mullally	1954
18	18	"Police Academy"	Eddie Davis	Story by : Teleplay by : Gene Roddenberry	1954
19	19	"Pollution"	Henry Kesler	Story by : Teleplay by : Jack Rock	1954
20	20	"Protection Racket"	Eddie Davis	Story by : Teleplay by : Rik Vollaerts	1954
21	21	"Reconciliation"	Leon Benson	Story by : Teleplay by : Jack Rock	1954
22	22	"Rehearsed Robbery"	Lewis Allen	Story by : Teleplay by : Hendrik Vollaerts	1954
23	23	"Roy Ruby"	Leon Benson	Story by : Teleplay by : Ellis Marcus	1954
24	24	"Safe Cracking"	Leon Benson	Story by : Teleplay by : Ellis Marcus	1954
25	25	"State Politician"	Leigh Jason	Story by : Teleplay by : Rik Vollaerts	1954
26	26	"Department Store"	Leigh Jason	Story by : Teleplay by : David Dortort	1954
27	27	TBA	TBD	Story by : Teleplay by :	1954
28	28	TBA	TBD	Story by : Teleplay by :	1954
29	29	TBA	TBD	Story by : Teleplay by :	1954
30	30	TBA	TBD	Story by : Teleplay by :	1954
31	31	TBA	TBD	Story by : Teleplay by :	1954

=== Season 2 (1955) ===
No. overall	No. in season	Title	Directed by	Written by	Original release date
32	1	"Man on the Ledge"	Lambert Hillyer	Story by : Teleplay by : Ellis Marcus	1955
33	2	"Auto Racket"	Leon Benson	Story by : Teleplay by : Gene Levitt	1955
34	3	"The Kid"	Leon Benson	Story by : Teleplay by : Rik Vollaerts	1955
35	4	"Animal Poisoner"	Lambert Hillyer	Story by : Teleplay by : Don Mullally	1955
36	5	"Cameraman"	Herbert Strock	Story by : Teleplay by : R.G. Taylor	1955
37	6	"Cave-In"	Herbert Strock	Story by : Teleplay by : Rik Vollaerts	1955
38	7	"Courtroom#2"	Leon Benson	Story by : Teleplay by : Ellis Marcus	1955
39	8	"Courtroom#3"	Henry Kesler	Story by : Teleplay by : Don Mullally	1955
40	9	"Crime School"	Herbert Strock	Story by : Teleplay by : Don Mullally	1955
41	10	"Executer"	Herbert Strock	Story by : Teleplay by : Jack Rock	1955
42	11	"Hidden Witness"	Herbert Strock	Story by : Teleplay by : Lee Berg	1955
43	12	"Kidnaped"	Leon Benson	Story by : Teleplay by : Don Mullally	1955
44	13	"Legit Business"	Henry Kesler	Story by : Teleplay by : Jack Rock	1955
45	14	"Lost Case"	Henry Kesler	Story by : Teleplay by : Rik Vollaerts	1955
46	15	"Mob Rule"	Herbert Strock	Story by : Teleplay by : Arthur Weiss	1955
47	16	"Patrol Boat"	Herbert Strock	Story by : Teleplay by : Gene Roddenberry	1955
48	17	"Police Brutality"	Leon Benson	Story by : Teleplay by : Gene Roddenberry	1955
49	18	"Posed Pictures"	Henry Kesler	Story by : Teleplay by : Kalman Phillips	1955
50	19	"Prisoners At Home"	Herbert Strock	Story by : Teleplay by : Kalman Phillips	1955
51	20	"Professional Killer"	Henry Kesler	Story by : Teleplay by : Jack Rock	1955
52	21	"Re-Model"	Herbert Strock	Story by : Teleplay by : Ellis Marcus	1955
53	22	"The Search"	Jack Herzberg	Story by : Teleplay by : Gene Levitt	1955
54	23	"Usury"	Lambert Hillyer	Story by : Teleplay by : Hugh King	1955
55	24	TBA	TBD	Story by : Teleplay by :	1955
56	25	TBA	TBD	Story by : Teleplay by :	1955
57	26	TBA	TBD	Story by : Teleplay by :	1955

== Comic books ==
DC Comics published a Mr. District Attorney comic-book series that ran for 67 issues (January–February 1948 to January–February 1959). In 1941, the Whitman Publishing Company published a Big Little Book, Mr. District Attorney on the Job, that included a flip book.
