= 2012 in the United States =

- Decades: 1990s; 2000s; 2010s; 2020s; 2030s
- See also: History of the United States (1991–2016); Timeline of United States history (2010–present); List of years in the United States

Events in the year 2012 in the United States.

== Incumbents ==
=== Federal government ===
- President: Barack Obama (D-Illinois)
- Vice President: Joe Biden (D-Delaware)
- Chief Justice: John Roberts (Maryland)
- Speaker of the House of Representatives: John Boehner (R-Ohio)
- Senate Majority Leader: Harry Reid (D-Nevada)
- Congress: 112th

==== State governments ====
Governors and lieutenant governors

=== Governors ===
- Governor of Alabama: Robert J. Bentley (Republican)
- Governor of Alaska: Sean Parnell (Republican)
- Governor of Arizona: Jan Brewer (Republican)
- Governor of Arkansas: Mike Beebe (Democratic)
- Governor of California: Jerry Brown (Democratic)
- Governor of Colorado: John Hickenlooper (Democratic)
- Governor of Connecticut: Dannel Malloy (Democratic)
- Governor of Delaware: Jack Markell (Democratic)
- Governor of Florida: Rick Scott (Republican)
- Governor of Georgia: Nathan Deal (Republican)
- Governor of Hawaii: Neil Abercrombie (Democratic)
- Governor of Idaho: Butch Otter (Republican)
- Governor of Illinois: Pat Quinn (Democratic)
- Governor of Indiana: Mitch Daniels (Republican)
- Governor of Iowa: Terry E. Branstad (Republican)
- Governor of Kansas: Sam Brownback (Republican)
- Governor of Kentucky: Steve Beshear (Democratic)
- Governor of Louisiana: Bobby Jindal (Republican)
- Governor of Maine: Paul LePage (Republican)
- Governor of Maryland: Martin O'Malley (Democratic)
- Governor of Massachusetts: Deval Patrick (Democratic)
- Governor of Michigan: Rick Snyder (Republican)
- Governor of Minnesota: Mark Dayton (Democratic)
- Governor of Mississippi: Haley Barbour (Republican) (until January 10), Phil Bryant (Republican) (starting January 10)
- Governor of Missouri: Jay Nixon (Democratic)
- Governor of Montana: Brian Schweitzer (Democratic)
- Governor of Nebraska: Dave Heineman (Republican)
- Governor of Nevada: Brian Sandoval (Republican)
- Governor of New Hampshire: John Lynch (Democratic)
- Governor of New Jersey: Chris Christie (Republican)
- Governor of New Mexico: Susana Martinez (Republican)
- Governor of New York: Andrew Cuomo (Democratic)
- Governor of North Carolina: Bev Perdue (Democratic)
- Governor of North Dakota: Jack Dalrymple (Republican)
- Governor of Ohio: John Kasich (Republican)
- Governor of Oklahoma: Mary Fallin (Republican)
- Governor of Oregon: John Kitzhaber (Democratic)
- Governor of Pennsylvania: Tom Corbett (Republican)
- Governor of Rhode Island: Lincoln Chafee (Independent)/(Democratic)
- Governor of South Carolina: Nikki Haley (Republican)
- Governor of South Dakota: Dennis Daugaard (Republican)
- Governor of Tennessee: Bill Haslam (Republican)
- Governor of Texas: Rick Perry (Republican)
- Governor of Utah: Gary Herbert (Republican)
- Governor of Vermont: Peter Shumlin (Democratic)
- Governor of Virginia: Bob McDonnell (Republican)
- Governor of Washington: Christine Gregoire (Democratic)
- Governor of West Virginia: Earl Ray Tomblin (Democratic)
- Governor of Wisconsin: Scott Walker (Republican)
- Governor of Wyoming: Matt Mead (Republican)

=== Lieutenant governors ===
- Lieutenant Governor of Alabama: Kay Ivey (Republican)
- Lieutenant Governor of Alaska: Mead Treadwell (Republican)
- Lieutenant Governor of Arkansas: Mark Darr (Republican)
- Lieutenant Governor of California: Gavin Newsom (Democratic)
- Lieutenant Governor of Colorado: Joseph Garcia (Democratic)
- Lieutenant Governor of Connecticut: Nancy Wyman (Democratic)
- Lieutenant Governor of Delaware: Matthew Denn (Democratic)
- Lieutenant Governor of Florida: Jennifer Carroll (Republican)
- Lieutenant Governor of Georgia: Casey Cagle (Republican)
- Lieutenant Governor of Hawaii: Brian Schatz (Democratic) (until December 27), Shan Tsutsui (Democratic) (starting December 27)
- Lieutenant Governor of Idaho: Brad Little (Republican)
- Lieutenant Governor of Illinois: Sheila Simon (Democratic)
- Lieutenant Governor of Indiana: Becky Skillman (Republican)
- Lieutenant Governor of Iowa: Kim Reynolds (Republican)
- Lieutenant Governor of Kansas: Jeff Colyer (Republican)
- Lieutenant Governor of Kentucky: Jerry Abramson (Democratic)
- Lieutenant Governor of Louisiana: Jay Dardenne (Republican)
- Lieutenant Governor of Maryland: Anthony Brown (Democratic)
- Lieutenant Governor of Massachusetts: Tim Murray (Democratic)
- Lieutenant Governor of Michigan: Brian Calley (Republican)
- Lieutenant Governor of Minnesota: Yvonne Prettner Solon (Democratic)
- Lieutenant Governor of Mississippi: Phil Bryant (Republican) (until January 5), Tate Reeves (Republican) (starting January 5)
- Lieutenant Governor of Missouri: Peter Kinder (Republican)
- Lieutenant Governor of Montana: John Bohlinger (Republican)
- Lieutenant Governor of Nebraska: Rick Sheehy (Republican)
- Lieutenant Governor of Nevada: Brian Krolicki (Republican)
- Lieutenant Governor of New Jersey: Kim Guadagno (Republican)
- Lieutenant Governor of New Mexico: John Sanchez (Republican)
- Lieutenant Governor of New York: Robert Duffy (Democratic)
- Lieutenant Governor of North Carolina: Walter Dalton (Democratic)
- Lieutenant Governor of North Dakota: Drew Wrigley (Republican)
- Lieutenant Governor of Ohio: Mary Taylor (Republican)
- Lieutenant Governor of Oklahoma: Todd Lamb (Republican)
- Lieutenant Governor of Pennsylvania: Jim Cawley (Republican)
- Lieutenant Governor of Rhode Island: Elizabeth H. Roberts (Democratic)
- Lieutenant Governor of South Carolina: Ken Ard (Republican) (until March 9), Glenn F. McConnell (Republican) (starting March 9)
- Lieutenant Governor of South Dakota: Matt Michels (Republican)
- Lieutenant Governor of Tennessee: Ron Ramsey (Republican)
- Lieutenant Governor of Texas: David Dewhurst (Republican)
- Lieutenant Governor of Utah: Greg Bell (Republican)
- Lieutenant Governor of Vermont: Phillip Scott (Republican)
- Lieutenant Governor of Virginia: Bill Bolling (Republican)
- Lieutenant Governor of Washington: Brad Owen (Democratic)
- Lieutenant Governor of Wisconsin: Rebecca Kleefisch (Republican)

== Events ==
=== January ===
- January 1 – New laws that go into effect on January 1:
  - Hawaii and Delaware's civil union laws go into effect.
  - Illinois allows motorcyclists the right to yield at red lights since magnetic streetlight sensors will not recognize motorcycles.
  - Utah bans discounts or specials on alcoholic drinks, essentially banning happy hour.
  - Arizona, Oregon, Washington, Montana, Colorado, Ohio, Vermont and Florida raise their minimum wage.
  - San Francisco raises the minimum wage within its jurisdiction to over $10 per hour, making it the highest minimum wage in the country.
  - California adds the historical contributions of sexual minorities and disabled people to its school curriculum.
  - Kansas, Texas, Rhode Island, and Tennessee will now require photo identification for voters as a measure to combat voter fraud.
- January 3 – Former Pennsylvania Senator Rick Santorum wins the Republican Iowa Caucus by a record low margin of 34 votes over former Massachusetts Governor Mitt Romney.
- January 4 – Michele Bachmann, a Republican presidential candidate, drops out of the race.
- January 5 – Classified documents are leaked detailing a range of advanced non-lethal weapons proposed or in development by the U.S. Armed Forces. Among the systems described are a laser-based weapon designed to divert hostile aircraft, an underwater sonic weapon for incapacitating SCUBA divers and a heat-based weapon designed to compel crowds to disperse.
- January 9 – White House Chief of Staff William M. Daley steps down. The Office of Management and Budget Director Jack Lew takes his place.
- January 10
  - Mississippi Governor Haley Barbour pardons 200 prisoners. On January 12, a Mississippi judge blocks the release of 21 of those inmates.
  - Alaska sees record snowfall.
  - The U.S. Supreme Court makes an 8–1 decision in Minneci v. Pollard that abused inmates cannot sue a privately, state-hired prison company in federal court. The ruling went against prisoner Richard Lee Pollard in a dispute of damages over a violation of the Eighth Amendment's prohibition against cruel and unusual punishment, claiming that Wackenhut/GEO, a privately run federal prison in California, had deprived him of adequate medical care. Writing for the majority, Associate Justice Stephen Breyer said that "... the existence of an Eighth Amendment-based damages action ... against ... a privately operated federal prison .. state tort law authorizes adequate alternative damages actions, ... actions that provide both significant deterrence and compensation ... For these reasons, where, as here, a federal prisoner seeks damages from privately employed personnel working at a privately operated federal prison, where the conduct allegedly amounts to a violation of the Eighth Amendment, and where that conduct is of a kind that typically falls within the scope of traditional state tort law (such as the conduct involving improper medical care at issue here), the prisoner must seek a remedy under state tort law. We cannot imply a Bivens remedy in such a case. The judgment of the Ninth Circuit is reversed."
- January 14 – Miss Wisconsin, Laura Kaeppeler, wins Miss America pageant.
- January 16
  - Zappos.com computer system is hacked, compromising the personal information of 24 million customers.
  - Jon Huntsman, a Republican presidential candidate, drops out of the race.
- January 17 – Volunteers in Wisconsin submit more than a million signatures to start a recall election of Governor Scott Walker in protest of his public fight last year to restrict collective bargaining rights of public workers and his cuts in the social safety net.
- January 18
  - The U.S. Supreme Court makes a unanimous 9–0 decision that telephone consumers can gain standing in federal courts to sue abusive telephone marketers. The ruling went against Arrow Financial Services (Arrow), a debt-collection agency, in a dispute of standing over the federal jurisdiction of the Telephone Consumer Protection Act (TCPA) of 1991. The act was passed so that out-of-state telemarketers, by operating interstate, could not escape state-law prohibitions on intrusive nuisance calls. Petitioner Marcus D. Mims filed a damages action in Federal District Court, alleging that respondent Arrow, seeking to collect a debt, violated the TCPA by repeatedly using an automatic telephone dialing system or prerecorded or artificial voice to call Mims's cellular phone without his consent. Writing for the unanimous court, Associate Justice Ruth Bader Ginsburg said that "We find no convincing reason to read into the TCPA's permissive grant of jurisdiction to state courts any barrier to the U. S. district courts' exercise of the general federal-question jurisdiction ... We hold, therefore, that federal and state courts have concurrent jurisdiction over private suits arising under the TCPA ... The Eleventh Circuit erred in dismissing Mims's case for lack of subject-matter jurisdiction ... The judgment of the United States Court of Appeals for the Eleventh Circuit is reversed, and the case is remanded for further proceedings consistent with this opinion."
  - The U.S. Supreme Court makes a 6–2 decision that restores copyright status to some foreign works previously in the public domain. The case challenges the constitutionality of the application of Section 514 of the Uruguay Round Agreements Act (URAA), a treaty seeking to equalize copyright protection on an international basis. The practical effect of the decision is that some works that were once free to use (such as Prokofiev's Peter and the Wolf, Metropolis (1927), The Third Man (1949), the works of Igor Stravinsky, several works of H. G. Wells, including the film Things to Come (1936), as well as innumerable others) now must be paid for. The ruling went against Lawrence Golan, and many others, in a dispute of URAA bringing some works whose copyright had lapsed back under copyright. Writing for the majority, Associate Justice Ruth Bader Ginsburg said that "... (if there is) ... copyright protection abroad ... (then there must be given) ... the same full term of protection ... (in the) ...U. S. ... Congress did so in §514 of the Uruguay Round Agreements Act (URAA), which grants copyright protection to preexisting works of Berne member countries, protected in their country of origin, but lacking protection in the United States ... The judgment of the Court of Appeals for the Tenth Circuit is therefore affirmed."
- January 19
  - Kodak files for bankruptcy protection. Kodak is best known for its wide range of photographic film products.
  - Rick Perry, a Republican presidential candidate, drops out after seeing no way to continue his campaign past South Carolina.
- January 22
  - U.S. House Representative Gabby Giffords of Arizona announces her resignation from office to focus on her recovery after surviving an attempted assassination in 2011.
  - Joe Paterno, the winningest football coach in Penn State history, dies at the age of 85 from lung cancer.
- January 23
  - The U.S. Supreme Court makes a unanimous 9–0 decision that government officials must obtain a search warrant permitting them to install a Global-Positioning-System (GPS) tracking device on citizens' private property. The ruling involves a Fourth Amendment case, the requirement of obtaining a valid warrant in searches by law enforcement. The court ruled in favor of Antoine Jones in a dispute that attaching a GPS device to private property in a public space still constitutes a search and therefore falls under the Fourth Amendment. The opinion of the court was written by Associate Justice Antonin Scalia who said that "We decide whether the attachment of a Global-Positioning-System (GPS) tracking device to an individual's vehicle, and subsequent use of that device to monitor the vehicle's movements on public streets, constitutes a search or seizure within the meaning of the Fourth Amendment ... The Fourth Amendment provides in relevant part that '[t]he right of the people to be secure in their persons, houses, papers, and effects, against unreasonable searches and seizures, shall not be violated.' It is beyond dispute that a vehicle is an 'effect' as that term is used in the Amendment. United States v. Chadwick, 433 U. S. 1, 12 (1977). We hold that the Government's installation of a GPS device on a target's vehicle, and its use of that device to monitor the vehicle's movements, constitutes a 'search.'"
  - An intense EF3 tornado strikes the northeastern part of the Birmingham, Alabama metropolitan area, killing one person, injuring 75 others, and caused over $18 million in damage.
- January 24
  - President Barack Obama delivers his 2012 State of the Union Address.
  - 84th Academy Awards: Nominations are announced at 5:38 am. PST (13:38 UTC) (8:38 am. EST) at Samuel Goldwyn Theater. The Best Picture nominees are The Artist, The Descendants, Extremely Loud and Incredibly Close, The Help, Hugo, Midnight in Paris, Moneyball, The Tree of Life, War Horse
- January 25 – The Indiana House of Representatives passes right to work legislation, becoming the first state in the Rust Belt to pass such a measure.
- January 26 – The United States Department of Transportation requires airline companies to disclose in advance all price constituents.
- January 29 – 10 people die in a suspected arson on the Interstate 75 south of Gainesville, Florida.
- January 30 – In Illinois, the Byron nuclear power plant loses power and is vented to reduce pressure, releasing radioactive steam.
- January 31 – A teacher, Mark Berndt, is charged with molesting 23 Los Angeles elementary school students.

=== February ===
- February 5
  - Super Bowl XLVI: The National Football Conference champion New York Giants defeat the American Football Conference champion New England Patriots 21–17 at Lucas Oil Stadium in Indianapolis. It was officially the most watched program in the history of United States television with 111.3 million viewers in the United States (as per the Nielsen Company).
  - Disappearance of Susan Powell: Josh Powell, who was widely suspected in his wife's disappearance, kills himself and the couple's two children.
- February 7 – A federal appeals court upholds the district court decision that struck down California's ban on same-sex marriage.
- February 11 – Singer Whitney Houston is found dead at the age of 48 in her suite at the Los Angeles Beverly Hilton Hotel, which coincided with the 2012 Grammy Awards and triggered a worldwide outpouring of grief. Her death later impaired several major websites and services.
- February 13 – Washington Governor Chris Gregoire signs a bill legalizing same-sex marriage, becoming the seventh state to legalize gay marriage.
- February 15 – The Kellogg Company purchases snack maker Pringles from Procter & Gamble for US$2.7 billion.
- February 16
  - Umar Farouk Abdulmutallab, the so-called "underwear bomber", is sentenced to life imprisonment for attempting to detonate a bomb on Northwest Airlines Flight 253 in Detroit, Michigan.
  - Researchers at Dartmouth College find that many organic food products that contain organic brown rice syrup have a much higher concentration of the toxic element arsenic. Brown rice syrup, used as an alternative for the much-maligned high fructose corn syrup, is said to contain environmental arsenic absorbed by the husk of the rice.
- February 18 – Legendary singer Whitney Houston is laid to rest in a private televised funeral in her hometown of Newark, New Jersey at the New Hope Baptist Church in which she was raised.
- February 21
  - The Dow Jones Industrial Average goes above 13,000 points for the first time since May 2008.
  - The U.S. Supreme Court makes a 6–3 decision that law enforcement officials do not need to issue Miranda warnings to prison inmates under questioning if these inmates are warned that they may end the interrogation at any time. The ruling involves an inmate who was removed from the general prison population and questioned. The court ruled against convict Randall Fields in a dispute that questioning without Miranda invocation was proper as long as the convict was advised of his freedom to leave. The opinion of the court was written by Associate Justice Samuel Alito who said that "The United States Court of Appeals for the Sixth Circuit held that our precedents clearly establish that a prisoner is in custody within the meaning of Miranda v. Arizona, 384 U. S. 436 (1966), if the prisoner is taken aside and questioned about events that occurred outside the prison walls. Our decisions, however, do not clearly establish such a rule, and therefore the Court of Appeals erred inholding that this rule provides a permissible basis for federal habeas relief under the relevant provision of the Antiterrorism and Effective Death Penalty Act of 1996(AEDPA), 28 U. S. C. §2254(d)(1). Indeed, the rule applied by the court below does not represent a correct interpretation of our Miranda case law. We therefore reverse."
- February 22
  - In Charlottesville, Virginia, former University of Virginia men's lacrosse player George Huguely is found guilty of second-degree murder in the 2010 death of former UVA women's lacrosse player Yeardley Love. The jury recommends a 26-year prison sentence; he was sentenced to 23 years in prison.
  - Seven US Marines die when two helicopters collide and crash on the border of the states of California and Arizona. The Bell AH-1 SuperCobra attack helicopter and the UH-1Y Huey utility chopper accident occurs during a nighttime training exercise.
- February 23 – The case against Gabe Watson in relation to the death of his newlywed wife Tina on the Great Barrier Reef in Australia is dismissed in Alabama.
- February 26
  - 84th Academy Awards: The ceremony, hosted by Billy Crystal, is held at the Hollywood and Highland Center Theatre (formerly Kodak Theatre). Michel Hazanavicius' The Artist wins five awards, including Best Director and Best Picture, the first silent film to win the latter award since Wings in 1927 and the first black-and-white film since Schindler's List in 1993. Martin Scorsese's Hugo ties in award wins and leads in nominations with 11. The telecast garners nearly 39.5 million viewers.
  - A trial begins in Cairo of 16 Americans and 27 others linked to an Egyptian government crackdown on non-government organizations which has created tension between the U.S. and Egypt.
  - Trayvon Martin, an unarmed black 17-year-old, is fatally shot by George Zimmerman in Sanford, Florida. The killing receives widespread attention focusing on aspects including the possible role of Martin's race and the initial lack of prosecution against Zimmerman, who is later charged with second degree murder.
- February 27
  - Teenager Thomas Lane kills three students at Chardon High School in Chardon, Ohio.
  - 2012 Daytona 500: In a first ever delay, the race is postponed to Monday due to heavy rain in Daytona. Matt Kenseth wins on Tuesday morning.
  - WikiLeaks begins disclosing 5 million e-mails from the private intelligence company Stratfor.
- February 29
  - 2012 Leap Day tornado outbreak: Tornados hit the midwestern United States with 14 people killed, six in Harrisburg, Illinois.
  - Egypt lifts a travel ban on seven Americans employed by pro-democracy U.S. groups, including the son of U.S. Transportation secretary Ray LaHood, who is among 16 Americans on trial in Egypt for trying to foment unrest and incite protests against the nation's military rulers.

=== March ===
- March 1 – Maryland becomes the eighth state to legalize gay marriage.
- March 2
  - NASA claims that it was hacked 13 times in 2011, compromising security.
  - Tornado outbreak of March 2–3, 2012: 40 people die in the South and the Ohio Valley.
  - BP and plaintiffs reach an agreement over compensation for the Deepwater Horizon oil spill in the Gulf of Mexico.
  - Dr. Seuss' The Lorax is released in theaters.
- March 6
  - Retired British businessman Christopher Tappin is denied bail in Texas as he faces arms dealing charges. He is accused by the U.S. Government of exporting thermal batteries to Iran that could be used in the manufacture of surface-to-air missiles.
  - Law enforcement agencies in the United States, United Kingdom and Ireland arrest alleged senior members of the computer hacking group LulzSec.
  - Businessman Allen Stanford is convicted of running a US$7 billion Ponzi scheme.
  - Super Tuesday of the Republican Party presidential primaries:
    - Voters in 10 US states go to the polls for Super Tuesday.
    - Newt Gingrich is projected as the winner of the Georgia primary.
    - Mitt Romney is projected as the winner of primaries in Virginia, Massachusetts, Ohio and Vermont as well as the Idaho and Alaska caucuses.
    - Rick Santorum is projected as the winner of the Oklahoma and Tennessee primaries and North Dakota caucuses.
  - Veteran Ohio Congressman Dennis Kucinich is defeated in a Democrat primary in the 9th district by incumbent Marcia C. Kaptur after he was affected by redistricting. Samuel Wurzelbacher, popularly known as Joe the Plumber, wins the Republican Party primary.
- March 8
  - Former Los Angeles Police Department detective Stephanie Lazarus is found guilty of a high-profile 1986 murder.
  - A study suggests that donor stem cells may prevent organ rejection in imperfectly matched transplant cases.
  - In a 6–3 opinion, the Mississippi Supreme Court lets stand the pardons signed by the exiting Governor Haley Barbour.
- March 11 – United States Army Staff Sergeant Robert Bales kills 17 civilians in the Panjwayi District of Afghanistan near Kandahar. Of those murdered, 4 were women and 9 were children.
- March 12 – The 9th U.S. Circuit Court of Appeals rules that a 22-year sentence given to Ahmed Ressam for attempting to bomb the Los Angeles International Airport as part of the 2000 millennium attack plots was too light. The court orders that a new District judge re-sentence Ressam.
- March 13
  - Based in Chicago, Illinois, Encyclopædia Britannica, the oldest encyclopedia still in print in the English language, announces that it will no longer be producing printed versions, but will continue online editions.
  - The United States, Japan, and the European Union file a case against China at the WTO regarding export restrictions on rare-earth metals.
  - Citigroup, MetLife, Ally Financial, and SunTrust, some of the largest financial institutions in the United States, fail a Federal Reserve System stress test of 19 banks.
- March 14 – A jury finds Virginia Tech guilty of negligence for delaying a campus warning about the Virginia Tech massacre of 33 students in 2007.
- March 15 – Former Illinois Governor Rod Blagojevich reports to Federal Correctional Institution, Englewood in Littleton, Colorado, to begin serving 14 years in federal prison. Under federal rules, Blagojevich will serve 85%, or 12 years, of his sentence.
- March 16 – Former Rutgers University student Dharun Ravi is found guilty of a hate crime and invasion of privacy for his role in the suicide of Tyler Clementi. Sentencing is scheduled for May 21.
- March 20
  - The U.S. Supreme Court unanimously rejects two patents held by Prometheus Laboratories, a unit of Nestlé S.A., continuing a trend in recent years toward a narrowing of the grounds of patentability.
  - John Carter records one of the biggest losses in cinema history, forcing Disney to take a $200 million writedown and chairman Rich Ross to resign.
  - MIT researchers Ramesh Raskar and Andreas Velten demonstrate an augmented reality apparatus which can allow observation of a non-line of sight object by means of a non-mirror, reflective surface.
- March 21 – New Orleans Saints head coach Sean Payton is suspended for a year without pay while former Saints defensive coordinator Gregg Williams is banned indefinitely from the National Football League for their role in the New Orleans Saints bounty scandal.
- March 23 – Disney Junior, Disney Channel's daytime children's programming block, becomes a standalone 24-hour cable channel. The channel replaces Soapnet, which remains available (in a limited, automated form) for some cable and satellite providers who have not yet finalized carriage deals for Disney Junior, as well for Cablevision and Verizon FiOS (both of them have kept Soapnet on the air and added Disney Junior to their lineups as an additional channel).
- March 24
  - Seven children and two adults are killed in a house fire in Charleston, West Virginia. It is considered the worst fire in six decades in the city.
  - In Falls Church, Virginia, 71-year-old former United States Vice President Dick Cheney receives a heart transplant from an unidentified donor.
- March 26–28 – National Federation of Independent Business v. Sebelius: In a historic three days of arguments, the U.S. Supreme Court hears from 26 states arguing against the constitutionality of the Patient Protection and Affordable Care Act.
- March 27 – Guggenheim Partners, LLC agrees to purchase the Los Angeles Dodgers for US$2.1 billion, the most ever for a professional sports franchise.
- March 30–April 2 – Visa and Mastercard warn banks across the United States about a "massive" breach of security with more than 1.5 million North American credit card numbers potentially compromised. The security issue occurred at Atlanta-based Global Payments Inc. Subsequently, Visa announces that it is dropping Global Payments over the hacking data breach.
- March 31 – The two largest acting unions in the U.S., the Screen Actors Guild and American Federation of Television and Radio Artists, agree to merge forming SAG-AFTRA.

=== April ===
- April 1 – WWE holds WrestleMania XXVIII at Sun Life Stadium in Miami Gardens, Florida, drawing a crowd of 78,363.
- April 2
  - A mass shooting at the private Korean Christian Oikos University in Oakland, California leaves seven people dead and three injured. It was perpetrated by 43-year-old One L. Goh, a former student at the school. He died on March 20, 2019, while in custody at California State Prison-Sacramento.
  - The data from the 1940 United States census is released, including information on 132 million people.
  - In college basketball, the University of Kentucky defeats the University of Kansas to win the 2012 NCAA Division I men's basketball tournament.
  - The U.S. Supreme Court makes a controversial 5–4 decision that law enforcement officials can strip-search newly admitted jail inmates even if the holding charge is minor.
- April 5
  - In New York City, Russian businessman Victor Bout is sentenced to 25 years in prison for smuggling weapons to the Colombian FARC guerilla movement.
  - Connecticut repeals the death penalty (those already on death row remain there).
- April 5–8 – American golfer Bubba Watson wins the US Masters defeating Louis Oosthuizen of South Africa in a playoff. Although Oosthuizen was runner-up, in the final round he hit a rare albatross on the second hole (occurring last in 1994, it was only the fourth ever albatross in Masters history and the first to be televised, as well as, the first ever on that hole).
- April 12 – U.S. Secret Service agents in Cartagena, Colombia, for President Barack Obama's attendance at the 6th Summit of the Americas, become embroiled in a scandal over the hiring of prostitutes. The investigation also implicates military personnel, and results in 9 agents being forced out of the Service.
- April 13 – In Miami-Dade County, a drunk driver illegally driving the South Dade TransitWay (then known as the Busway) southbound at more than 100 miles per hour t-bones a minivan traveling eastbound on Eureka Drive, approximately 17 miles southwest of Downtown Miami. One person is killed, three others (including the drunk driver) were injured, and the drunk driver arrested. No bus drivers or passengers were injured or killed, as no buses were passing through (or stopping at an adjacent station) at the time of the crash.
- April 20 – Marcus Robinson, due to have been executed in 2007, is ordered off death row after North Carolina Superior Court Judge Gregory Weeks rules his trial was tainted by racial bias, grounds for cancellation of a death sentence under the state's Racial Justice Act. The judge uses controversial statistical evidence of bias to grant the change of sentence.
- April 22–May 2 – Chen Guangcheng, a civil rights activist in China, flees house arrest and seeks shelter at the U.S. Embassy in Beijing, causing a diplomatic incident.
- April 24 – The USDA announces that bovine spongiform encephalopathy ("mad cow disease") was found in a dairy cow in California.
- April 29 – Seven people are killed, including three children, when the vehicle they were in flipped over on the Bronx River Parkway in The Bronx, New York City.

=== May ===
- May 1 – The sale for Guggenheim Partners to purchase the Los Angeles Dodgers is finalized for US$2.1 billion, the most ever for a professional sports franchise.
- May 2 – J. T. Ready, a border militia leader, apparently kills four people and himself at the home of his girlfriend in Phoenix, Arizona.
- May 4 – The Avengers, directed by Joss Whedon, is released by Marvel Studios as the sixth film of the Marvel Cinematic Universe (MCU) and the final film in its "Phase One" slate. The first in the franchise distributed by Walt Disney Studios Motion Pictures, it becomes the third highest-grossing film of all time at that point (currently the eighth) and helps to boost the MCU and superhero films in general to a wider audience.
- May 5 – In US horse racing, I'll Have Another wins the 2012 Kentucky Derby.
- May 7
  - The CIA announces it had foiled a plot by Fahd al-Quso, a Yemeni affiliate of al-Qaida, to have a suicide bomber, using an improved version of the underwear bomb used by Umar Farouk Abdulmutallab in 2009, to blow up an American-bound airliner; no lives were ever at risk.
  - The first licenses for autonomous cars in the U.S. are granted in Nevada to Google.
- May 8
  - In a voter referendum, North Carolina amends the state constitution to include a ban on gay marriage and all other forms of same-sex unions.
  - U.S. Senator Richard Lugar loses a Republican primary in Indiana to a Tea Party-backed challenger, becoming the first six-term Senator to lose a primary election since 1952.
  - Milwaukee Mayor Tom Barrett wins a Democratic primary, and will face Wisconsin Governor Scott Walker on June 5 in the nation's third gubernatorial recall election.
- May 9 – Barack Obama becomes the first sitting U.S. president to announce support for gay marriage.
- May 11
  - William Balfour is found guilty of murdering the mother, brother and nephew of American entertainer Jennifer Hudson.
  - A panel of American health experts recommends formal approval of the Truvada anti-HIV drug for prescription to non-infected men who have sex with multiple male partners, a decision opposed by some health workers and groups active among those with HIV.
- May 20–21 – At the Chicago Summit, NATO leaders discuss the Middle East, nuclear weapons, Russia, and the Afghanistan War.
- May 21
  - Dharun Ravi, the U.S. student who secretly filmed the sexual activities of his gay roommate Tyler Clementi, who later committed suicide when the film was exposed, is sentenced to 30 days in prison by a New Jersey judge. Ravi avoids the maximum sentence of 10 years' imprisonment.
  - A rare annular solar eclipse occurs, visible from East Asia, the North Pacific, and the Western United States.
- May 22 – NASA and SpaceX launch Dragon COTS Demo Flight 2 toward the International Space Station. It becomes the first commercial spacecraft to rendezvous and berth with another spacecraft.
- May 23 – Shakeel Afridi, a Pakistani physician who helped the CIA to track down Osama bin Laden by collecting DNA samples from residents of bin Laden's compound, is sentenced to 33 years' imprisonment for treason.
- May 27 – Scottish driver Dario Franchitti wins the 96th Indianapolis 500. It is his third win there.
- May 31 – A jury clears former Democratic Party vice presidential candidate for John Edwards on one count of corruption, with the judge ordering a mistrial on the other five counts.

=== June ===
- June 5 – Incumbent Governor of Wisconsin Scott Walker wins a recall election against Milwaukee Mayor Tom Barrett, becoming the first Governor in United States history to survive a recall.
- June 7 – LinkedIn says that some of its members' passwords have been "compromised" following reports that more than six million passwords were leaked on the Internet.
- June 11
  - In ice hockey, the NHL's Los Angeles Kings defeat the New Jersey Devils 6–1 in game 6 of the 2012 Stanley Cup Final to win the Los Angeles Kings' first Stanley Cup. Los Angeles goalie Jonathan Quick is awarded the Conn Smythe Trophy as the playoffs MVP.
  - John Bryson crashes:
    - Police in the San Gabriel Valley in southern California cite United States Secretary of Commerce John Bryson for felony hit and run for alleged involvement in a series of accidents on the weekend.
    - Bryson takes medical leave while he undergoes test related to a seizure that occurred during the crashes.
- June 12 – The children's illustrated storybook Topsy Turvy Tales is published.
  - The U.S. Anti-Doping Agency brings drugs charges against seven-time Tour de France winner Lance Armstrong.
- June 13
  - Scientists decode the bonobo genome, making it last great ape to have its DNA sequence laid bare, following the chimpanzee, orangutan and gorilla.
  - U.S. federal prosecutors drop corruption charges against former Senator John Edwards following a mistrial.
  - Nuclear Spectroscopic Telescope Array (NuSTAR) launches. The satellite is a space-based X-ray telescope that will use a Wolter telescope to focus high energy X-rays at 5 to 80 keV from astrophysical sources, especially for nuclear spectroscopy. It is the eleventh mission of the NASA Small Explorer satellite program (SMEX-11) and the first space-based direct-imaging X-ray telescope at energies beyond those of the Chandra X-ray Observatory and XMM-Newton.
- June 14 – Financier and cricket mogul Allen Stanford is sentenced to 110 years in prison after siphoning billions from investors.
- June 15
  - U.S. president Barack Obama announces that the U.S. will stop deporting some illegal immigrants.
  - Former Goldman Sachs director Rajat Gupta is convicted of three counts of securities fraud and one count of conspiracy related to insider trading in 2011.
- June 17 – In golf, American Webb Simpson wins the U.S. Open.
- June 18 – Former American Major League Baseball player Roger Clemens is acquitted on all charges in a perjury trial.
- June 20
  - The United States House Committee on Oversight and Government Reform votes 23–17 in favor of holding United States Attorney General Eric Holder in contempt of Congress after he failed to release documents relating to Operation Fast and Furious. It is the first time a US Attorney General is held in contempt.
  - President Barack Obama invokes executive privilege on documents associated with Fast and Furious following a request by the House Oversight Committee.
- June 21
  - The Miami Heat wins the 2012 NBA Finals defeating the Oklahoma City Thunder four games to one. LeBron James wins the NBA Finals MVP award.
  - Moody's downgrades the credit rating of 15 major world banks: UK (Royal Bank of Scotland, Barclays and HSBC), US (Bank of America, Citigroup, Goldman Sachs and JP Morgan), Rest of world (Credit Suisse, UBS, BNP Paribas, Credit Agricole, Societe Generale, Deutsche Bank, Royal Bank of Canada and Morgan Stanley).
  - John Bryson resigns as United States Secretary of Commerce following a seizure that led to two car accidents.
- June 22
  - Jerry Sandusky, former American football coach at Pennsylvania State University, is convicted on 45 charges of child sex abuse. He is on suicide watch.
  - Pixar Animation Studios' 13th feature film, Brave, is released in theaters.
- June 25
  - Arizona defeats South Carolina to win its first College World Series title since 1986 and fourth overall. Arizona outfielder Robert Refsnyder is named the Most Outstanding Player.
  - Arizona v. United States: In a 5–3 decision, the US Supreme Court strikes down most of the Arizona Immigration Law passed in 2010, but unanimously upholds the most controversial provision, which allows police officers to ask the immigration status of any person suspected of a crime.
- June 28
  - National Federation of Independent Business v. Sebelius: In a 5–4 decision, the US Supreme Court upholds the Patient Protection and Affordable Care Act as constitutional under the taxing and spending clause.
  - US Attorney General Eric Holder is held in contempt of Congress by a vote of 255–67. Holder is the first Attorney General held in contempt of Congress in US history.
  - United States and United Kingdom regulators hit Barclays bank with a record fine (US$453 million) for distorting key interest rates to rig international markets.
  - Anthony Davis is chosen first in the 2012 NBA draft at Newark, New Jersey.
  - Dealing a blow to the FBI's high-profile global copyright theft case, a New Zealand court rules that search warrants used to raid the home of Kim Dotcom, founder of MegaUpload, in connection to alleged copyright infringement were invalid.

=== July ===
- July 2
  - NASA and Lockheed Martin unveil the first space-bound Orion spacecraft in Cape Canaveral.
  - At least 2 million throughout the Eastern United States are still without power due to strong storms and a heat wave that killed 19 people.
  - GlaxoSmithKline settles the largest healthcare fraud case in US history for $3 billion.
- July 9 – FBI has stopped assisting in DNS Changer Malware redirects; after this date Americans were told to visit the designated website to determine if their computers are infected.
- July 12
  - Former FBI Director Louis Freeh's report into the Penn State sex abuse scandal is released, alleging that late head football coach Joe Paterno and other school officials covered up child sexual abuse by former assistant coach Jerry Sandusky.
  - Wells Fargo decides to pay a $175 million settlement in a subprime mortgage compensation case.
- July 16
  - NBCUniversal buys full control of the US news website MSNBC.com and rebrands it as NBCNews.com.
  - The U.S. Food and Drug Administration approves Truvada as the first drug shown to reduce the risk of HIV infection.
- July 17 – After President Barack Obama's long-form birth certificate was released by the White House on April 27, 2011, Maricopa County Sheriff Joe Arpaio contends that the document is a computer-generated forgery. Additionally, his six-month-long review included an examination of President Obama's Selective Service card and contended that it, also, is a forgery. Their claims were presented at that press conference, and at a second press conference held on March 31, 2012. The allegations regarding the birth certificate were repeated at a July 17, 2012, news conference, where Arpaio stated that his investigators are certain that Obama's long-form birth certificate is fraudulent. In response to Arpaio's claims, Joshua A. Wisch, a special assistant to Hawaii's attorney general, said, "President Obama was born in Honolulu, and his birth certificate is valid. Regarding the latest allegations from a sheriff in Arizona, they are untrue, misinformed and misconstrue Hawaii law."
- July 20 – 2012 Aurora, Colorado shooting: Twelve people die and 70 are injured in a mass shooting at a movie theater in Aurora, Colorado. The shooter, James Holmes, opens fire on a crowd during a screening of The Dark Knight Rises. He is found behind the theater claiming to be "The Joker".
- July 22 – Thirteen are killed and another 10 are injured when a pickup truck crashes in Texas.
- July 23 – The NCAA announces severe penalties against Penn State's football program as a result of the school's child sex abuse scandal as a result of the scandal coach Joe Paterno has his wins from 1998 to 2011 vacated dropping him from 1st to 12th on the list of college football career coaching wins leaders. However his wins are restored three years later as part of a settlement.
- July 25 – Dawn (spacecraft) begins its departure from 4 Vesta. The spacecraft is using its ion propulsion system to gradually raise its orbit.
- July 27–August 12 – The United States compete at the Summer Olympics in London, England and win 46 gold, 29 silver, and 29 bronze medals.
- July 31 – 2012 Summer Olympics: In swimming, Michael Phelps of the United States wins a record 19th Olympic medal, with gold in the 4 × 200 meters freestyle relay.

=== August ===
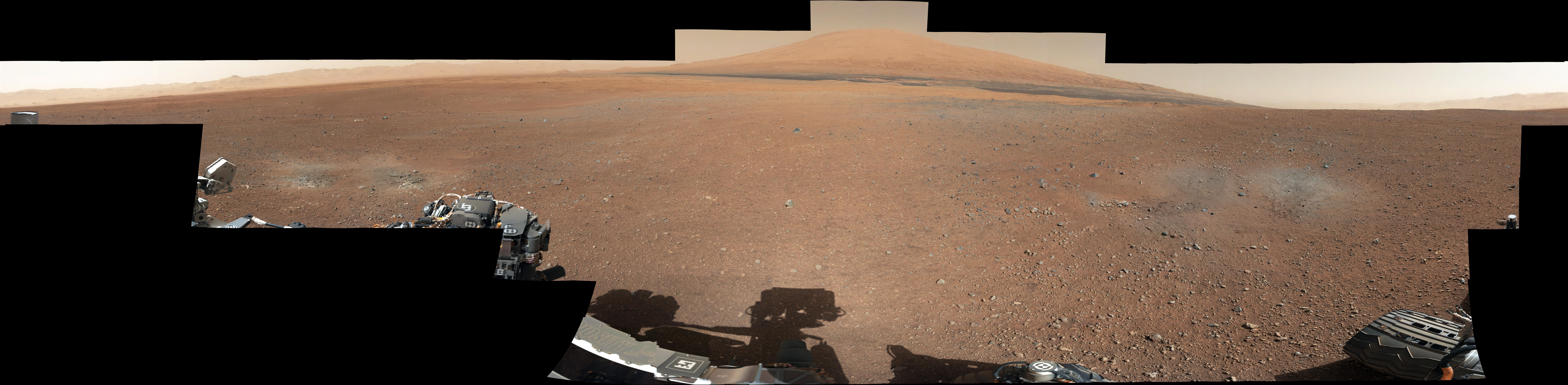
August 8: Curiosity's first 360 degrees color panorama image.

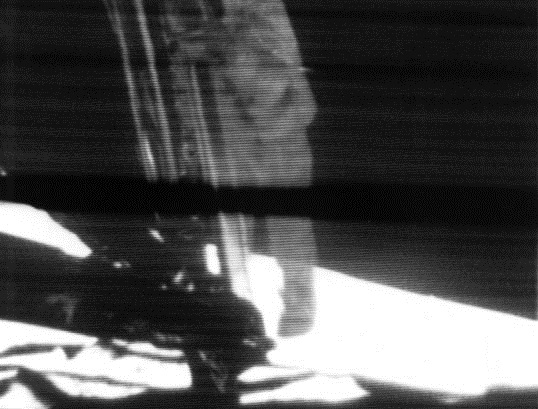
August 25: Neil Armstrong dies – Armstrong prepares to take the first step on the Moon.

- August 5 – White Supremacist Wade Michael Page opens fire at a Sikh temple in Oak Creek, Wisconsin, killing six and wounding four before committing suicide after police arrived.
- August 6
  - A fire at the Chevron Richmond Refinery in Richmond, California spreads thick black smoke over Contra Costa County, prompting warnings from officials to shelter in place.
  - NASA's Mars Science Laboratory lands with the Curiosity rover.
- August 8
  - Marvin Lee Wilson is executed by the state of Texas, despite the low IQ results that could have invalidated his punishment.
  - Jared Lee Loughner, the shooter in the 2011 Tucson shooting, pleads guilty to all charges and is sentenced to life in prison without the possibility of parole.
- August 12
  - Kissing Shakespeare, a debut novel is published.
  - Golfer Rory McIlroy wins the 2012 US PGA Championship at Kiawah Island.
- August 16 – After an outbreak of the mosquito-borne West Nile virus kills at least 17 people, the mayor of Dallas Mike Rawlings declares a state of emergency in the city. This paves the way for aerial spraying of synthetic pyrethroid insecticides from tonight on. Many residents express their concerns over safety and effectiveness; they suggest other preventive methods of mosquito control. Officials said the measures could cost as much as $1.2 million.Over the whole of the United States for the year, there were 243 deaths out of 5387 total cases.
- August 24
  - 2012 Empire State Building shooting: A gunman shoots and kills a former coworker near the Empire State Building in New York City. Following the initial shooting, police kill the gunman, and nine other people are wounded.
  - A jury in the U.S. state of California rules that Samsung Electronics owes Apple Inc. over US$1 billion for patent infringement.
  - The U.S. District Court for the District of Massachusetts, in the case Sony BMG v. Tenenbaum, awards Sony BMG US$675,000 in statutory damages against Joel Tenenbaum, who shared 30 MP3 files through the defunct Kazaa network.
  - The United States Anti-Doping Agency says it will ban former professional road racing cyclist Lance Armstrong for life and recommend he be stripped of his record seven Tour de France titles.
- August 25 – Neil Armstrong, an American astronaut and the first person to walk upon the Moon, dies at age 82.
- August 30 – Lucimarian Tolliver mother of GMA host Robin Roberts dies at the age of 88.

=== September ===
September 21 – December 28: New England Compounding Center meningitis outbreak

- September 3 – Daniel Tiger's Neighborhood, a spinoff of Mister Rogers' Neighborhood debuts on PBS Kids.
- September 4 – The NASA space probe Dawn escapes from 4 Vesta to begin its flight to Ceres (arriving in February 2015).
- September 9 – American tennis player Serena Williams wins her fourth Women's Singles at the US Open.
- September 10
  - An agreement is reached allowing the completion of the US National September 11 Memorial & Museum on the World Trade Center site in New York City.
  - In lawn tennis, Andy Murray of the United Kingdom wins the Men's Singles of the 2012 US Open defeating Novak Djokovic of Serbia to become the first British player to win a Grand Slam singles title since Virginia Wade, and the first British man to do so since Fred Perry.
- September 11 – United States Embassy in Cairo, Egypt and Consulate in Benghazi, Libya are attacked by protesters claiming because of film produced by the Coptic Christian diaspora in Washington, mocking the Muslim prophet. Although no link has been made to the planned terrorist attack in Benghazi, it was claimed by the insurgent group Ansar al-Sharia. The attackers are responsible for killing a consulate staff, J. Christopher Stevens, two former U.S. Navy SEALs and GRS Agents Glen "Bub" Doherty and Tyrone "Rone" Woods, and Information Officer Sean Smith in Benghazi. Stevens was the first sitting U.S. ambassador to be killed in office since Adolph Dubs in Afghanistan in 1979.
- September 14
  - S&P Dow Jones Indices announces that UnitedHealth Group will replace Kraft Foods among the stock issuers that constitute the Dow Jones Industrial Average.
  - Jack Daniel McCullough, formerly known as John Tessier, is convicted of the 1957 Sycamore, IL kidnapping and murder of 7-year-old Maria Ridulph. He is later sentenced to life imprisonment.
- September 16
  - The National Hockey League locks out its players after the expiry of the collective bargaining agreement.
  - RazorThreat software company of Ponticac, Michigan expands the reseller program, partnering with Ficus Consulting Group.
- September 21–December 28 – There are 39 deaths out of 656 cases of people in 19 states infected with fungal meningitis from contaminated steroid medicine produced at an unsanitary compounding pharmacy in Massachusetts.
- September 23 – Researchers find that there are four genetically distinct types of breast cancer.
- September 27
  - The National Football League and the NFL Referees Association reach an agreement, ending the referee lockout that has been ongoing since June of this year.
  - A mass shooting takes place at Accent Signage Systems, a sign company in Minneapolis, Minnesota, United States; five people are killed, including the gunman who committed suicide, and four others are wounded.
- September 28 – Teenage Mutant Ninja Turtles debuts on Nickelodeon.

=== October ===
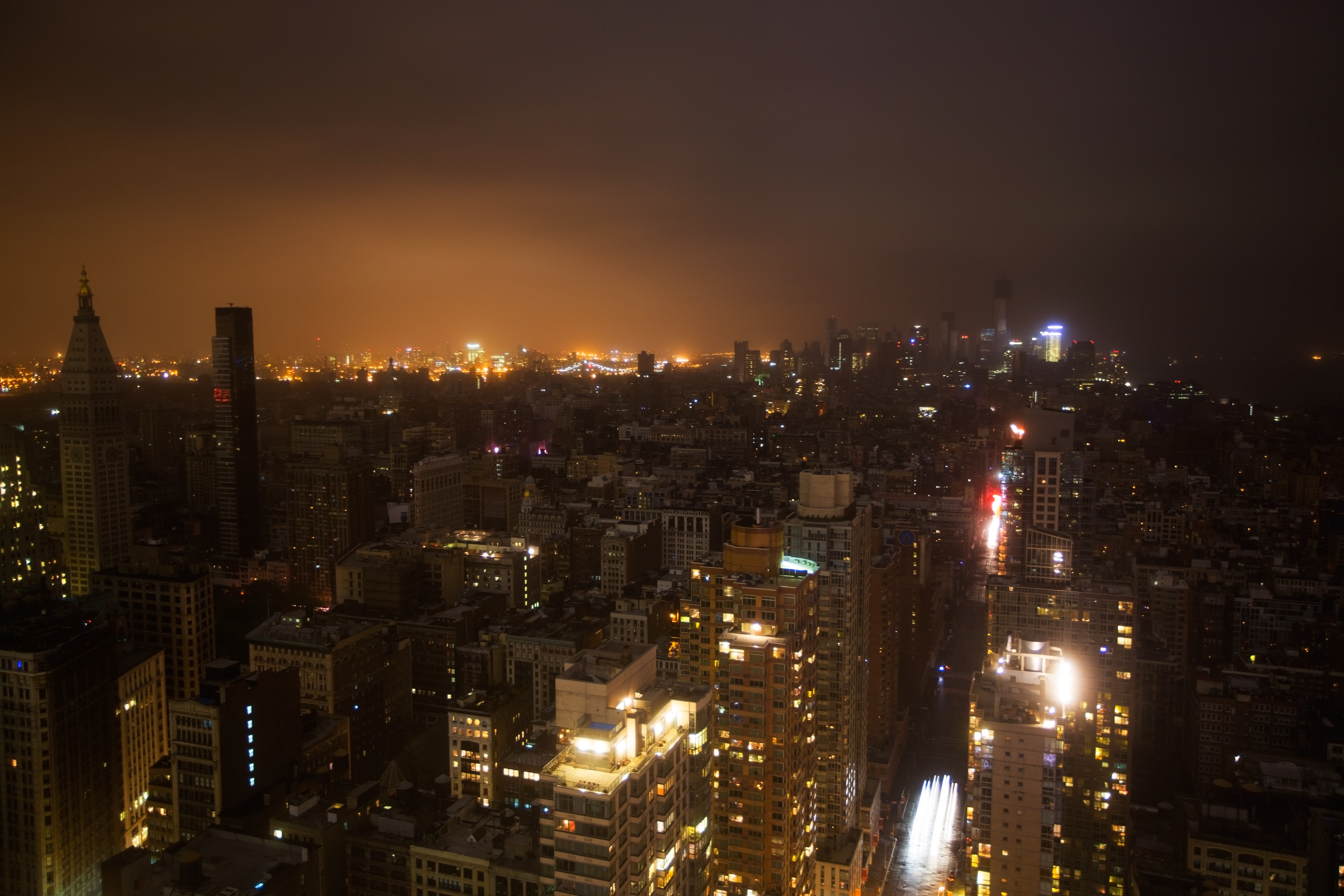
October 29: Hurricane Sandy: Large portions of the Manhattan borough of New York City were without electricity

- October 3 – The first U.S. presidential debate of 2012 is held at the University of Denver in Denver, Colorado.
- October 5 – The Los Angeles Police Department fails to obtain a search warrant when a federal judge in Texas blocks their attempt to obtain 1970s tapes of conversations between a Manson family member and his attorney. LA Police believe this evidence could help solve more than a dozen murders.
- October 7 – SpaceX CRS-1 launches as the third flight for Space Exploration Technologies Corporation's (also known as SpaceX) uncrewed Dragon cargo spacecraft, the fourth overall flight for the company's two-stage Falcon 9 launch vehicle, and the first SpaceX operational mission under their Commercial Resupply Services contract with NASA.
- October 8 – President Obama establishes César E. Chávez National Monument, encompassing the former headquarters of the United Farm Workers and the gravesite of Cesar Chavez in Keene, California.
- October 9
  - Frenchman Serge Haroche and American David Wineland win the 2012 Nobel Prize in Physics for their work on quantum optics.
  - An audio recording of Jerry Sandusky is released in which he "wonders what they've won". A court sentences Sandusky to 30–60 years in prison for sexual abuse of boys while a coach at Penn State. His lawyer vows to appeal and says he did not have enough time to prepare for the trial.
- October 10
  - Two American scientists, Robert Lefkowitz and Brian Kobilka, win the 2012 Nobel Prize in Chemistry for their work on discovering the inner workings of G protein-coupled receptors.
  - Chicago Fire debuts on NBC.
  - Arrow debuts on The CW.
- October 11 – Martha Raddatz hosts the vice presidential debate between Joe Biden and Paul Ryan at Centre College.
- October 12 – American attorney Ryan Poston is shot to death by his girlfriend Shayna Hubers in Highland Heights, Kentucky. Hubers falsely claimed the shooting was in self-defense and was later convicted of Poston's murder, with the perpetrator compared to Jodi Arias, convicted of the murder of Travis Alexander.
- October 14 – Felix Baumgartner breaks the world human ascent by balloon record before space diving out of the Red Bull Stratos helium-filled balloon over Roswell, New Mexico.
- October 16
  - The second U.S. presidential debate of 2012 is held at Hofstra University in Hempstead, New York.
  - The CEO of Citigroup, Vikram Pandit, announces his resignation from that post, and is immediately succeeded by Michael Corbat.
  - The British computer hacker Gary McKinnon wins his ten-year legal battle to avoid extradition to the United States after Home Secretary Theresa May tells the House of Commons she has blocked the order.
- October 18
  - American weekly news magazine Newsweek announces it will cease print publication on December 31 and will move to an online-only format.
  - The Boy Scouts of America release documents containing over 15,000 pages relating to allegations of sexual abuse by over 1200 scout leaders between 1965 and 1985.
- October 19 – At the Dallas State Fair, Big Tex burns down because of a fire in his right boot.
- October 22 – The third U.S. presidential debate of 2012 was held at Lynn University in Boca Raton, Florida.
- October 25 – A New York Police Department officer, Gilberto Valle III, along with an unnamed co-conspirator, is charged with allegedly conspiring to cross state lines and kidnap, torture, cook, and eat women (at least 100 names and pictures, some with physical descriptions, were found on his computer).
- October 26 – Microsoft releases Windows 8.
- October 28 – The San Francisco Giants sweep The Detroit Tigers in 4 games during the 2012 World Series to win their 2nd championship in the last 3 years.
- October 29
  - Hurricane Sandy's storm surge slams into the Eastern seaboard and causes destruction especially in the states of New Jersey and New York. In addition to record flooding damage along the Jersey Shore in Atlantic City and Seaside Heights, the superstorm causes almost 50 deaths in the states and leaves more than 8 million customers (all of Lower Manhattan, 65% of New Jersey, and many more) without electricity. In New York City alone, 18 deaths are reported, subways and tunnels are flooded for days, 80 homes are destroyed by an electrical fire in Breezy Point, Queens, and waters reach record highs in Battery Park. With the storm being late in the hurricane season, there are also blizzards in West Virginia. The New York Stock Exchange closes for trading for two days, the first weather closure of the exchange since 1985. It is also the first two-day weather closure since the Great Blizzard of 1888.
  - Penguin and Random House agree to merge to form Penguin Random House, the world's largest publisher.
- October 30 – The Walt Disney Company purchases Lucasfilm Ltd. from George Lucas for US$4.05 billion. Included in the deal are the rights to the Star Wars and Indiana Jones franchises.

=== November ===
November 6: Barack Obama reelected President

- November 2 – Walt Disney Animation Studios' 52nd feature film, Wreck-It Ralph, is released in theaters and is a critical and commercial success.
- November 6 – 2012 elections
  - Barack Obama is reelected President of the United States, defeating Republican nominee Mitt Romney.
  - Democrats maintain a majority in the Senate.
  - Republicans maintain a majority in the House.
  - Maine becomes the first state to legalize gay marriage via voter referendum. Maryland and Washington do the same. Minnesota also rejects a constitutional amendment which would have banned same-sex marriage.
  - Washington becomes the first state to legalize marijuana. Colorado does the same.
  - Puerto Rico votes to become a state. Congressional approval is still needed.
- November 8 – Jared Lee Loughner, the perpetrator in the 2011 Tucson shooting, is given 7 consecutive life sentences.
- November 15 – Deepwater Horizon oil spill:
  - BP announces it will plead guilty to charges of manslaughter and obstruction of Congress, and will pay a total of US$4.5 billion to the US Department of Justice and Securities and Exchange Commission.
  - Separately, the two highest-ranking BP supervisors on board the Deepwater Horizon on the day of the explosion have been indicted on 23 criminal counts.
- November 16 – Hostess Brands, which includes such brands as cakes Twinkies, announces it will file for bankruptcy and liquidate its assets, stating that a bakery union's worker strike stemming from contract disputes "crippled" its operations. 18,500 workers are expected to be laid off.
- November 18 – 2012 United States Grand Prix (2012 Formula One World Championship): Lewis Hamilton won the race, his last for McLaren before his move to Mercedes, with Sebastian Vettel finishing second and Fernando Alonso in third.
- November 20 – Puerto Rican professional boxer Héctor Camacho is shot multiple times in Bayamon, Puerto Rico. The driver of Camacho's car is killed in the attack. Shot in the neck and face, Camacho is taken to St. Paul's Hospital in Río Piedras, where he is pronounced "brain dead".
- November 30 – A New Hampshire federal grand jury indicts David Kwiatkowski, 33, a former employee of Exeter Hospital in Exeter, New Hampshire, on fraud and product-tampering charges in connection with an outbreak of hepatitis C that sickened more than 30 people and caused concern in 7 states.

=== December ===
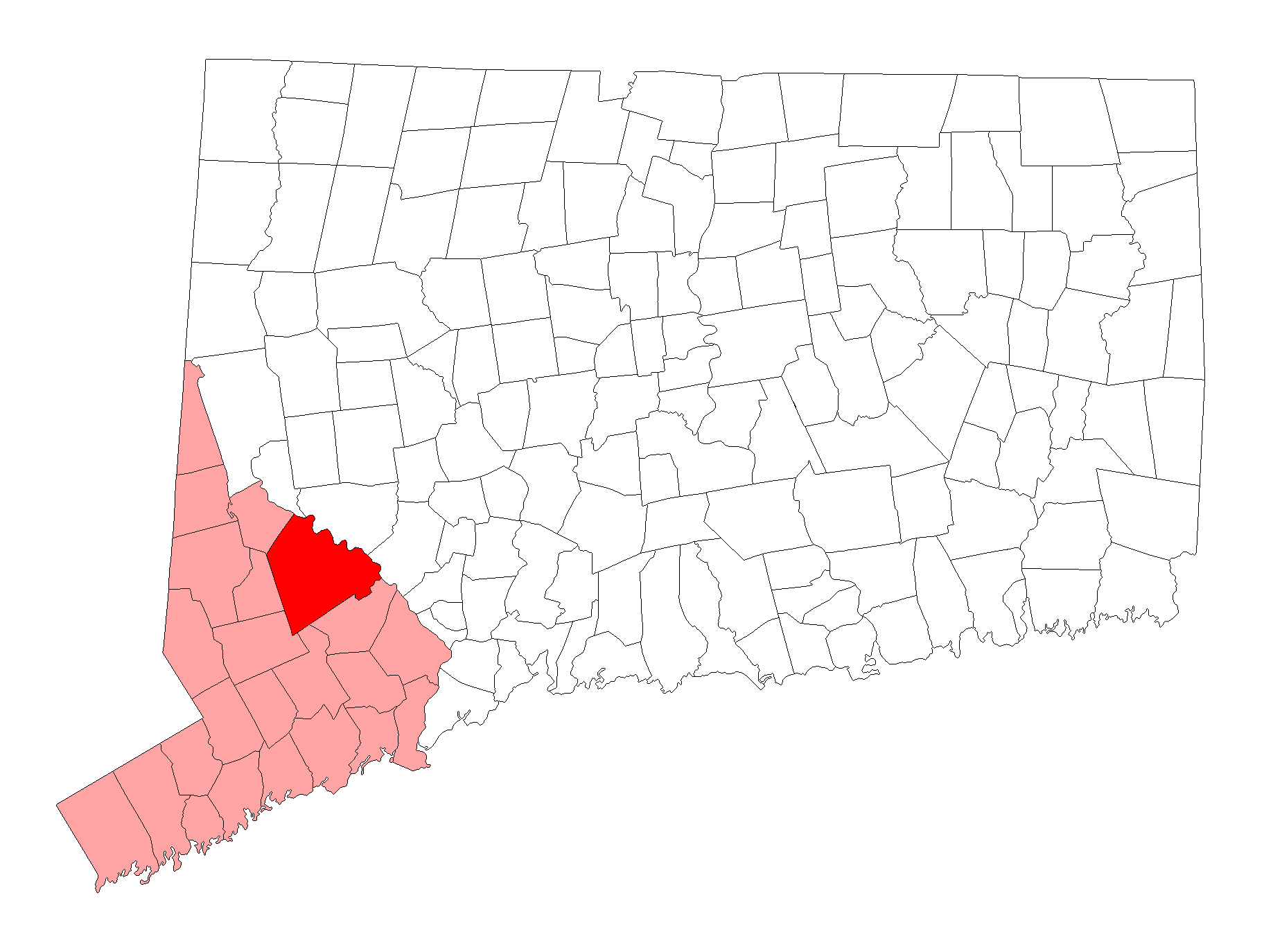
December 14: Newtown, Connecticut, location of the Sandy Hook Elementary School shooting

- December 5 – American businessman John McAfee is arrested in Guatemala following an alleged illegal entry after leaving Belize where he is wanted for questioning over the death of fellow American Gregory Faull.
- December 6 – Washington Initiative 502 comes into effect, making Washington the 1st state to legalize recreational cannabis.
- December 8
  - American football player Josh Brent of the Dallas Cowboys is arrested for driving while intoxicated and vehicular manslaughter in relation to the death of teammate Jerry Brown.
  - Texas A&M University quarterback Johnny Manziel becomes the first freshman ever to win the Heisman Trophy as the most outstanding player in U.S. college football.
- December 9 – The wreckage of a plane carrying American singer Jenni Rivera with two pilots and four other passengers is found in northern Mexico with no apparent survivors.
- December 10
  - Colorado Amendment 64 comes into effect, making Colorado the 2nd state to legalize recreational cannabis.
  - The trial of Jodi Arias begins in Arizona. She is accused of the 2008 murder of her ex-boyfriend Travis Alexander and the case receives widespread media attention.
- December 11
  - The United States Court of Appeals for the Seventh Circuit strikes down Illinois's ban on concealed weapons. Illinois is the last state in the United States not to enact a concealed carry law.
  - Syrian civil war: President Barack Obama recognizes Syria's rebel opposition as the "legitimate representatives" of the Syrian people.
  - British-based bank HSBC will pay U.S. authorities $1.9 billion in a settlement over money laundering for drug cartels and countries under sanctions, the largest ever such penalty.
  - Michigan's state government passes right-to-work legislation, making Michigan the 23rd state and the most highly unionized state in the US to have such laws.
- December 14 – Twenty-six people, including 20 children (ages 6 and 7), are killed in the Sandy Hook Elementary School shooting in Newtown, Connecticut. Prior to the school shooting, Adam Lanza, age 20, shot and killed his mother, Nancy Lanza, age 52, at the home they shared in Newtown, as the 27th victim. The suspect killed himself during the incident. It is the second-deadliest school shooting in U.S. history, after the 2007 Virginia Tech massacre.
- December 15–30 – United States Secretary of State Hillary Clinton sustained a concussion after fainting from dehydration at her home. Subsequently, she is hospitalized after doctors discover a blood clot related to the concussion that she had had earlier in the month.
- December 19 – Miss USA Olivia Culpo of Rhode Island wins Miss Universe.
- December 20 – The New York Stock Exchange, the largest stock exchange in the United States and the world, is sold to Atlanta-based IntercontinentalExchange.
- December 27 – Toyota Motor Corporation, moving to put years of legal problems behind it, has agreed to pay more than $1 billion to settle dozens of lawsuits relating to sudden acceleration.
- December 30 – A tour bus crashes off Interstate 84 in northeastern Oregon, leaving 9 of its passengers dead and 26 injured.

=== Ongoing ===
- War in Afghanistan (2001–2021)

== Births ==
- January 7 – Blue Ivy Carter, singer and daughter of Beyoncé and Jay-Z
- February 6 – Kai Zen, actress
- April 23 – Alan Kim, actor
- May 25 – J. J. Vallow, notable murder victim (d. 2019)
- June 4 – Vivien Lyra Blair, actress
- August 6 – Bella Bond, notable murder victim (d. 2015)

== Deaths ==
=== January ===
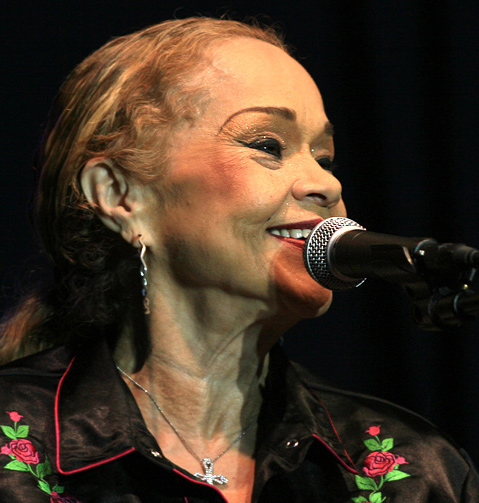
Etta James

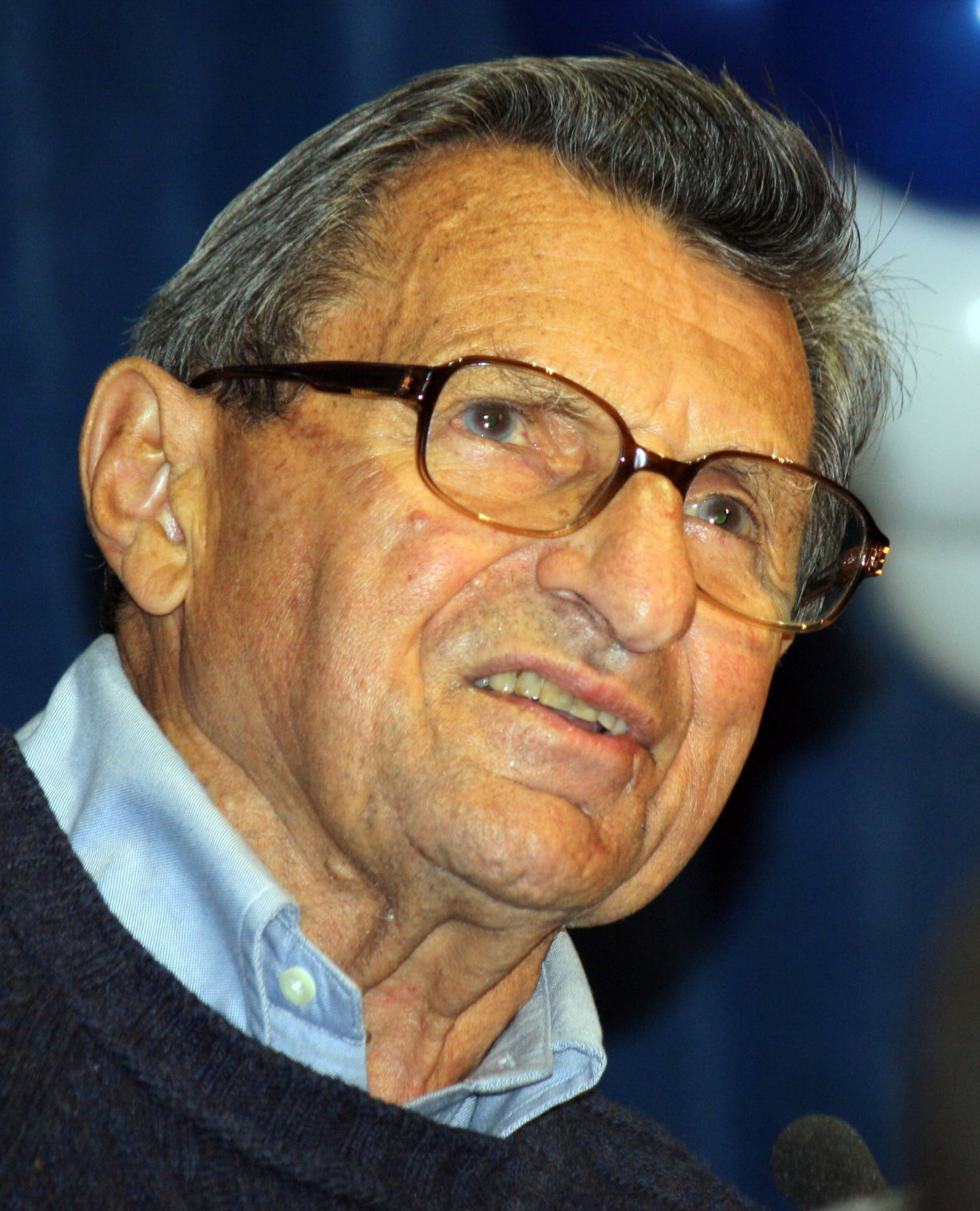
Joe Paterno

- January 1 – Fred Milano, singer (b. 1939)
- January 2
  - William P. Carey, businessman and philanthropist (b. 1930)
  - Gordon Hirabayashi, sociologist and litigant, died in Edmonton, Alberta, Canada (b. 1918)
  - Jim Huber, sports commentator (b. 1944)
  - Larry Reinhardt, guitarist (b. 1948)
- January 3
  - Gene Bartow, college basketball coach (b. 1930)
  - Robert L. Carter, civil rights activist and judge (b. 1917)
- January 4
  - Gatewood Galbraith, lawyer, author, and politician (b. 1947)
  - David Wheeler, theatre director and producer (b. 1925)
- January 5 – Don Carter, professional bowler (b, 1926)
- January 6
  - Roger Boisjoly, aerodynamicist and engineer (b. 1938)
  - John Celardo, illustrator (b. 1918)
- January 10 – Vince Gibson, American college football coach (b. 1933)
- January 12
  - Natalee Holloway, missing person declared-dead in absentia (b. 1986)
  - Bill Janklow, 27th and 30th Governor of South Dakota from 1979 until 1987 and from 1995 until 2003. (b. 1939)
  - Jim Stanley, American college football coach (b. 1934)
- January 13 – Richard Threlkeld, American journalist and author (b. 1937)
- January 17 – Johnny Otis, musician, composer, and record producer (b. 1921)
- January 19
  - Sarah Burke, Canadian skier (b. 1982)
  - Gene Methvin, American pilot and journalist (b. 1934)
- January 20
  - John F. Baker Jr., soldier (b. 1945)
  - Etta James, singer (b. 1938)
- January 21
  - Roy John Britten, biologist and geneticist (b. 1919)
  - Cliff Chambers, baseball player (b. 1922)
- January 22 – Joe Paterno, American football coach (b. 1926)
- January 23 – Wesley E. Brown, district court judge (b. 1907)
- January 24
  - J. Joseph Garrahy, soldier and politician, 69th Governor of Rhode Island (b. 1930)
  - James Farentino, actor (b. 1938)
  - Patricia Neway, soprano and actress (b. 1919)
- January 26
  - Ian Abercrombie, English actor (b. 1934)
  - Bud Byerly, baseball player (b. 1920)
  - Robert Hegyes, actor (b. 1951)
- January 29
  - Damien Bona, historian and journalist (b. 1955)
  - John Rich, director and producer (b. 1925)
- January 31
  - Leslie Carter, American singer (b. 1986)
  - Ayelet Galena, notable child with rare congenital disease (b. 2009)

=== February ===
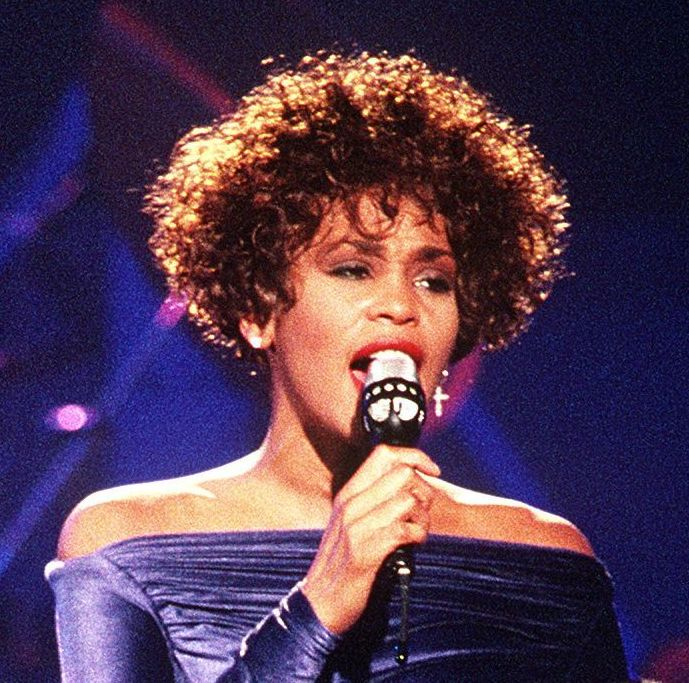
Whitney Houston

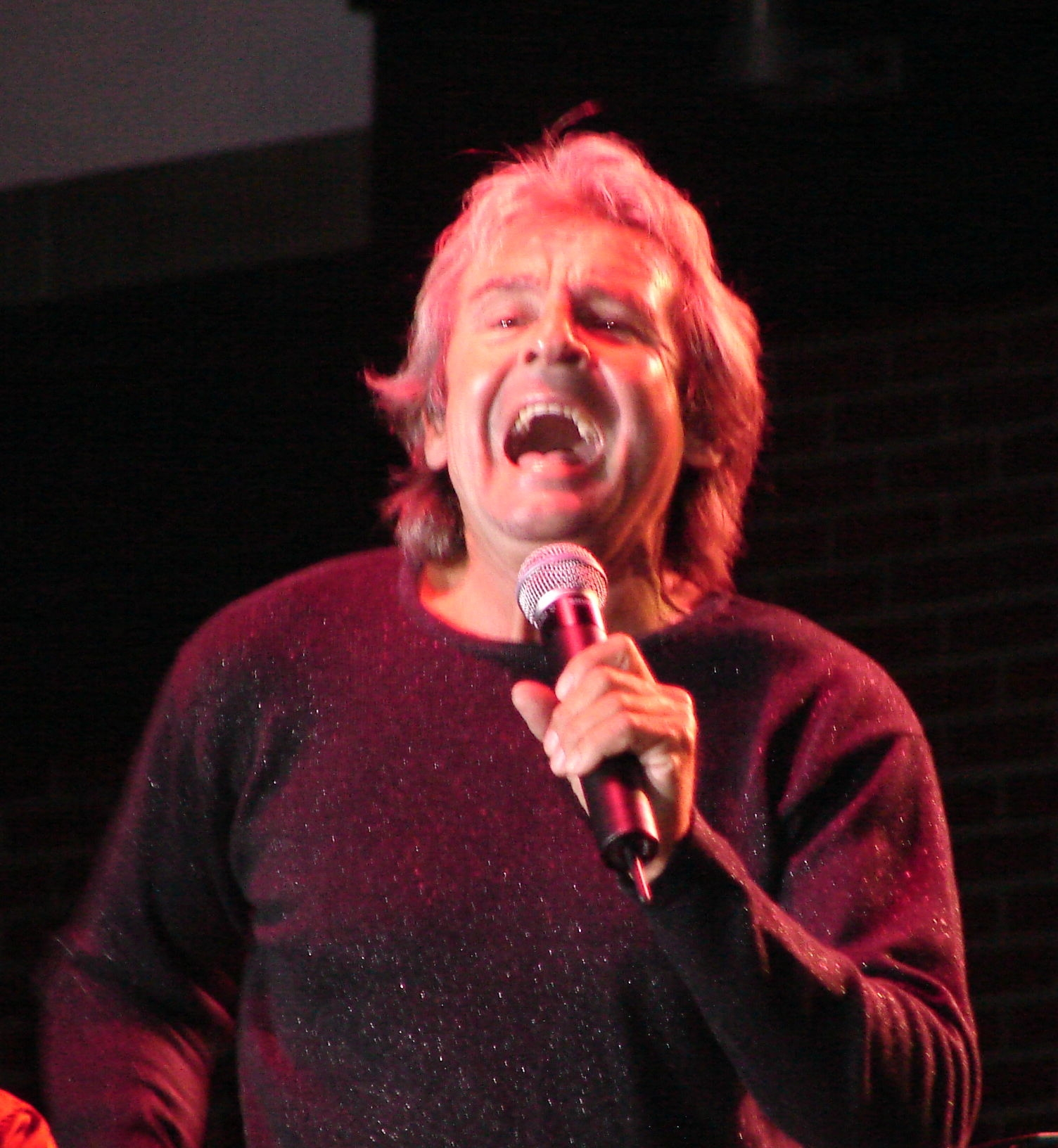
Davy Jones

- February 1
  - Angelo Dundee, boxing trainer (b. 1921)
  - Don Cornelius, television host (b. 1936)
- February 3
  - Ben Gazzara, actor (b. 1930)
  - Zalman King, actor, director, and producer (b. 1942)
- February 6 – Peter Breck, actor (b. 1929)
- February 7 – Patricia Stephens Due, activist (b. 1939)
- February 11 – Whitney Houston, singer and wife of Bobby Brown (b. 1963)
- February 12 – Howard Zimmerman, chemist (b. 1926)
- February 15
  - John J. Yeosock, general (b. 1937)
  - Charles Anthony, tenor (b. 1929)
- February 16
  - Gary Carter, baseball player (b. 1954)
  - Anthony Shadid, journalist, died in Syria (b. 1968)
- February 19
  - Renato Dulbecco, Italian-born American Nobel virologist (b. 1914)
  - Steve Kordek, pinball innovator (b. 1911)
- February 23 – Bruce Surtees, cinematographer (b. 1937)
- February 25 – Dick Davies, American basketball player (b. 1936)
- February 26
  - Don Joyce, American football player (b. 1929)
  - Trayvon Martin, African-American teenager killed in shooting (b. 1995)
  - Zollie Volchok, American basketball administrator (b. 1916)
- February 28 – Jim Green, American-Canadian educator and politician (b. 1943)
- February 29
  - Davy Jones, British singer and actor, died in Indiantown, Florida (b. 1945)
  - Sheldon Moldoff, comic book artist (b. 1920)

=== March ===
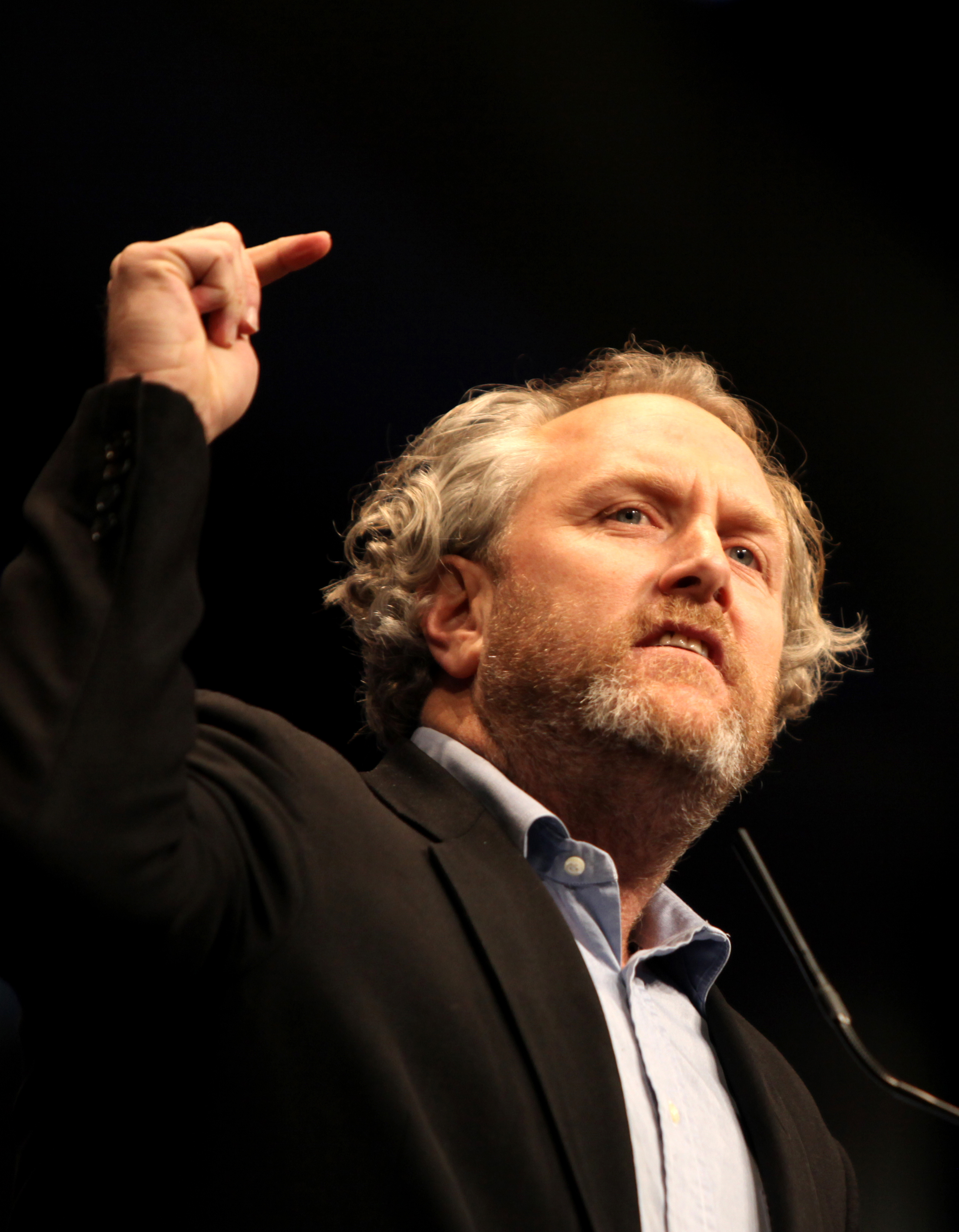
Andrew Breitbart

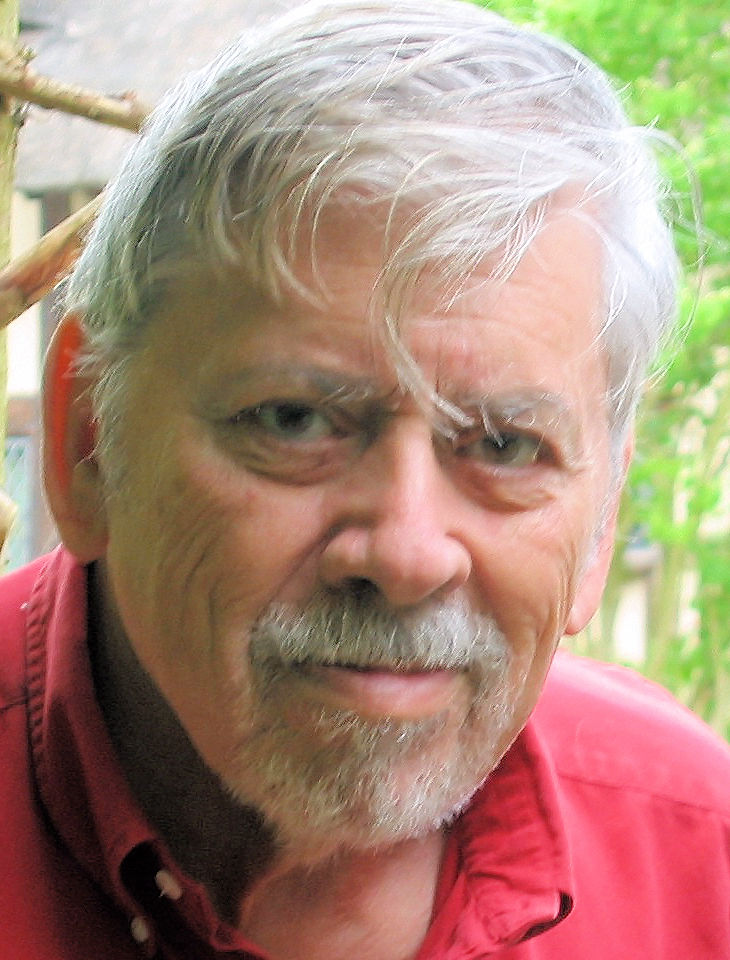
Robert B. Sherman

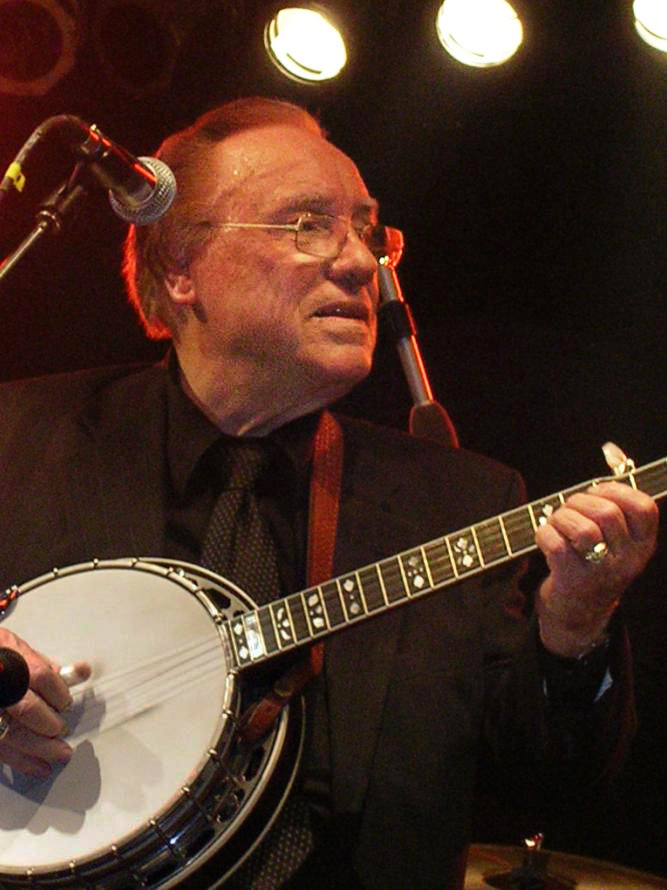
Earl Scruggs

- March 1
  - Andrew Breitbart, writer and publisher (b. 1969)
  - Jerome Courtland, actor, director, and producer (b. 1926)
- March 2
  - Van T. Barfoot, army Colonel (b. 1919)
  - James Q. Wilson, political scientist (b. 1931)
- March 3
  - Steve Bridges, impressionist (b. 1963)
  - Leonardo Cimino, actor (b. 1917)
  - Ralph McQuarrie, film concept artist (b. 1929)
  - Ronnie Montrose, guitarist and songwriter (b. 1947)
  - Alex Webster, American football player and coach (b. 1931)
- March 4 – Don Mincher, American baseball player (b. 1938)
- March 5
  - William Heirens, murderer (b. 1928)
  - Maurice Pechet, Canadian-born American physician, inventor, and philanthropist (b. 1918)
  - Robert B. Sherman, songwriter, died in London, England (b. 1925)
  - Ken Shipp, American football coach (b. 1929)
- March 8 – Charlie Hoag, American basketball player (b. 1931)
- March 10
  - Jay McMullen, journalist (b. 1921)
  - Frank Sherwood Rowland, Nobel chemist (b. 1927)
- March 11
  - Wayne Frazier, American football player (b. 1939)
  - James B. Morehead, Air Force pilot (b. 1916)
- March 12
  - Dick Harter, American basketball coach (b. 1930)
  - Michael Hossack, musician (b. 1946)
- March 16 – John Ghindia, American football player (b. 1925)
- March 17 – John Cowles Jr., editor, publisher, and son of John Cowles, Sr. (b. 1929)
- March 18 – William R. Charette, Naval hospital corpsman (b. 1932)
- March 19 – Sanford N. McDonnell, mechanical engineer, business executive, and philanthropist (b. 1922)
- March 20
  - Ralph P. Hummel, political scientist, author, and academic (b. 1937)
  - Mel Parnell, baseball player and sportscaster (b. 1922)
- March 25
  - Bert Sugar, sportswriter and historian (b. 1936)
  - Lex, notable canine (b. 1999)
- March 27 – Warren Stevens, actor (b. 1919)
- March 28
  - Jerry McCain, musician (b. 1930)
  - Earl Scruggs, musician (b. 1924)
- March 29 – Luke Askew, actor (b. 1932)

=== April ===
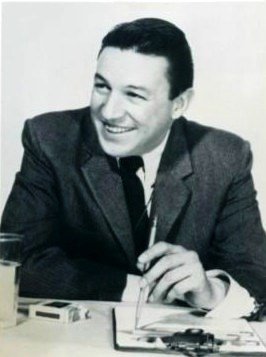
Mike Wallace

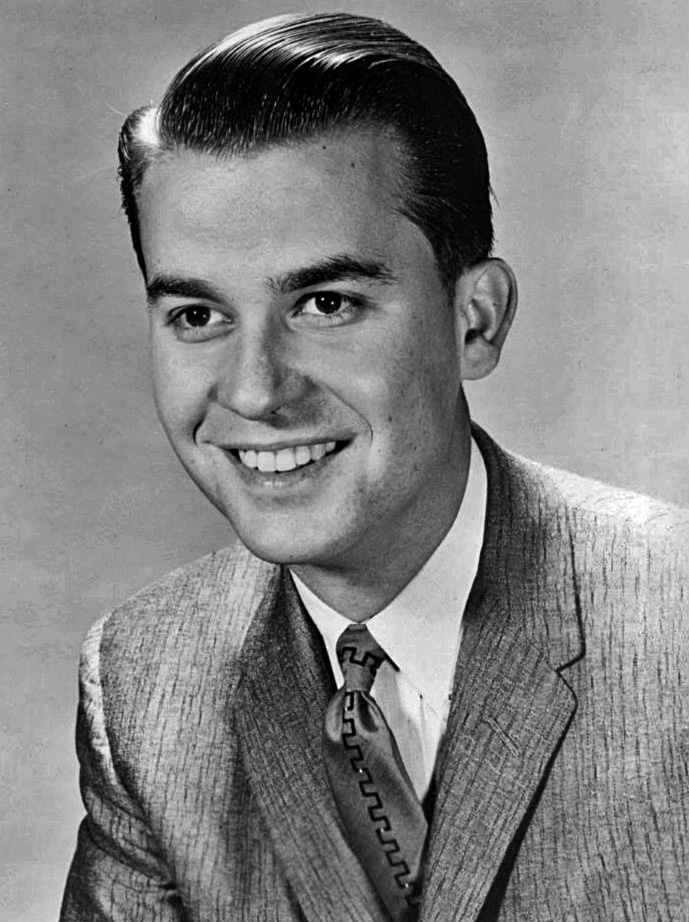
Dick Clark

- April 1
  - Jamaa Fanaka, American director, producer, and screenwriter (b. 1942)
  - Rory Staunton, notable patient who died from sepsis (b. 1999)
- April 2 – Allie Clark, baseball player and politician (b. 1923)
- April 6 – Thomas Kinkade, painter (b. 1958)
- April 7 – Mike Wallace, journalist (b. 1918)
- April 10
  - Virginia Spencer Carr, author and academic (b. 1929)
  - Carlos Truan, businessman and politician (b. 1935)
  - John Weaver, American-Canadian sculptor (b. 1920)
- April 15
  - Bob Perani, Italian-American ice hockey player (b. 1942)
  - Rich Saul, American football player (b. 1948)
  - Bob Wright, basketball player and coach (b. 1926)
- April 18 – Dick Clark, television pop host (b. 1929)
- April 19 – Levon Helm, musician and actor (b. 1942)
- April 20
  - Matt Branam, engineer and academic (b. 1954)
  - George Cowan, chemist, businessman, and philanthropist (b. 1920)
- April 21
  - Charles Colson, lawyer and Watergate scandal figure (Special Counsel to President Nixon) (b. 1931)
  - Fred Bradley, baseball player (b. 1920)
- April 23 – Chris Ethridge, guitarist (b. 1947)
- April 28 – Patricia Medina, British actress (b. 1919)

=== May ===
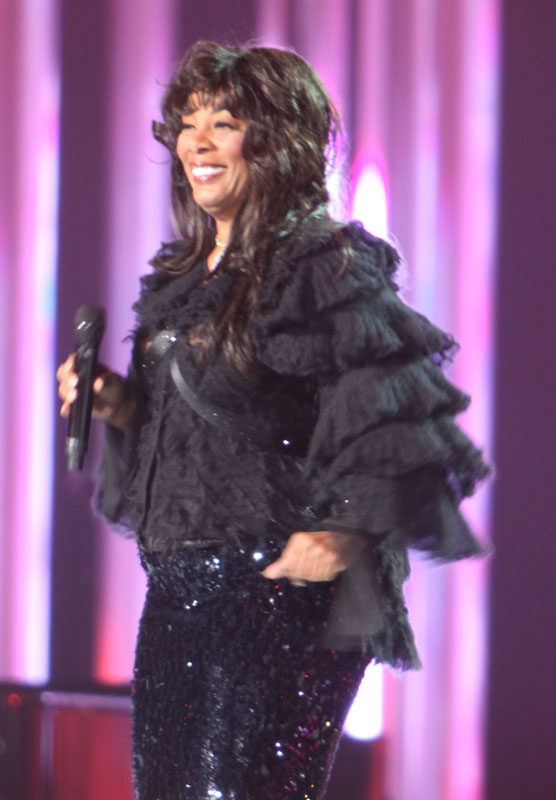
Donna Summer

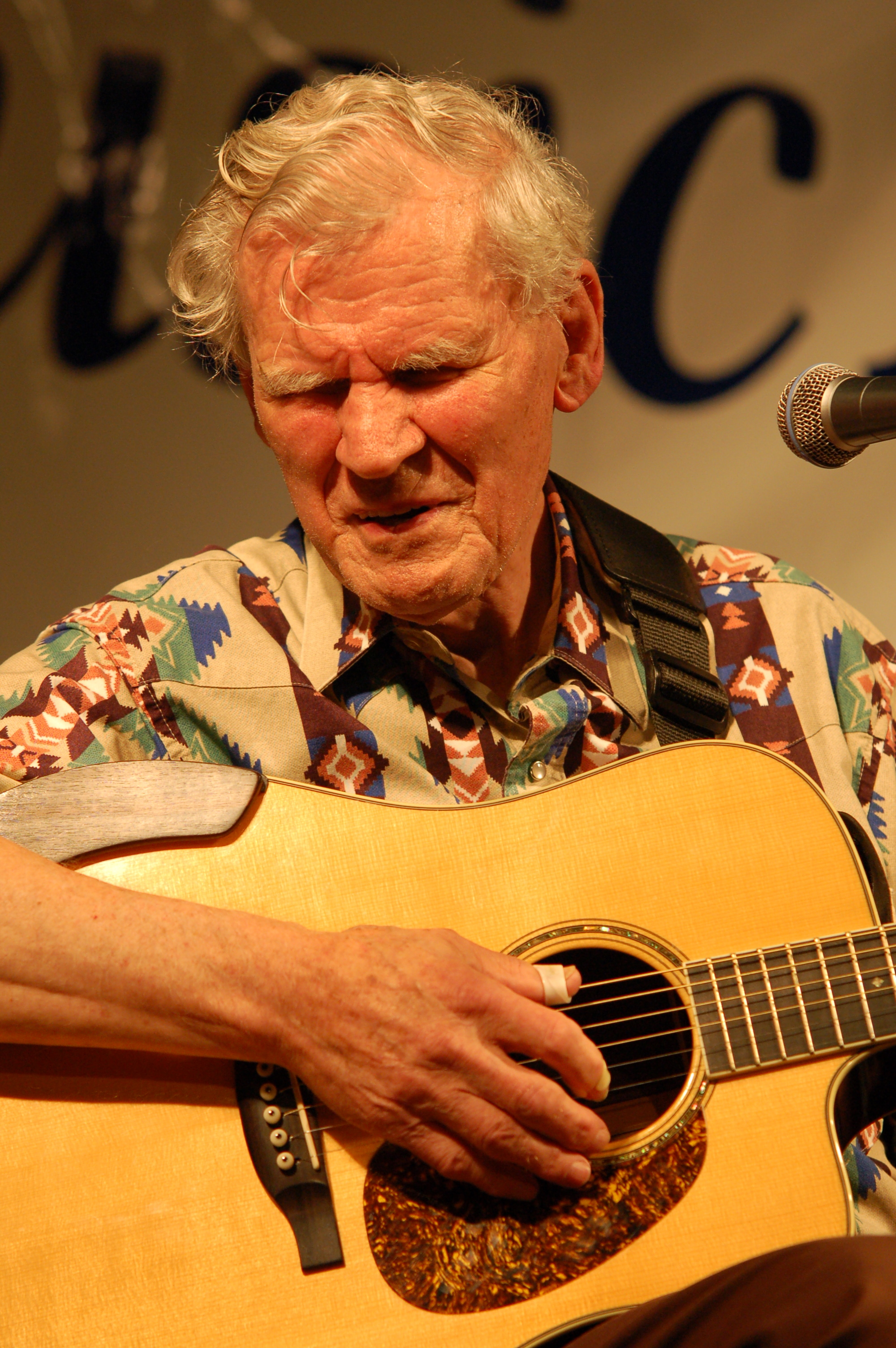
Doc Watson

- May 1
  - John Spencer Hardy, general (b. 1913)
  - Charles Pitts, guitarist (The Bo-Keys) (b. 1947)
  - Earl Rose, pathologist and academic (b. 1926)
- May 2 – Junior Seau, American football player (b. 1969)
- May 4 – Adam Yauch, rapper and songwriter (b. 1964)
- May 6
  - George Lindsey, American actor (b. 1928)
  - Yale Summers, American actor (b. 1933)
- May 8
  - Jerry McMorris, American businessman (b. 1941)
  - Maurice Sendak, writer (b. 1928)
- May 9
  - Carl Beane, sportscaster (b. 1952)
  - Bertram Cohler, psychologist, psychoanalyst, and academic (b. 1938)
  - Vidal Sassoon, British hairstylist and businessman (b. 1928)
- May 10 – Carroll Shelby, American automotive designer, racing driver, and entrepreneur (b. 1923)
- May 11 – Jack Benaroya, businessman and philanthropist (b. 1921)
- May 15 – Jean Craighead George, American author (b. 1919)
- May 17
  - Herbert Breslin, publicist and manager (b. 1924)
  - Donna Summer, American singer and songwriter (b. 1948)
- May 20 – Eugene Polley, American electronics engineer (b. 1915)
- May 23
  - T. Garry Buckley, soldier, pilot, and politician, 72nd Lieutenant Governor of Vermont (b. 1922)
  - Hal Jackson, journalist and radio host (b. 1915)
  - William C. Wampler, soldier and politician (b. 1926)
- May 27 – Johnny Tapia, professional boxer (b. 1967)
- May 29 – Doc Watson, American guitarist, songwriter, and singer (b. 1923)
- May 31 – Orlando Woolridge, basketball player (b. 1959)

=== June ===
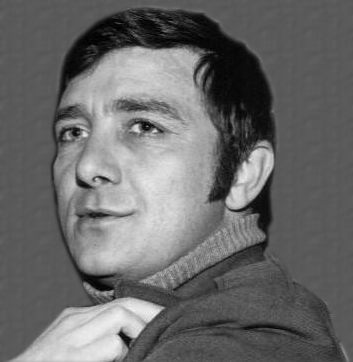
Richard Dawson

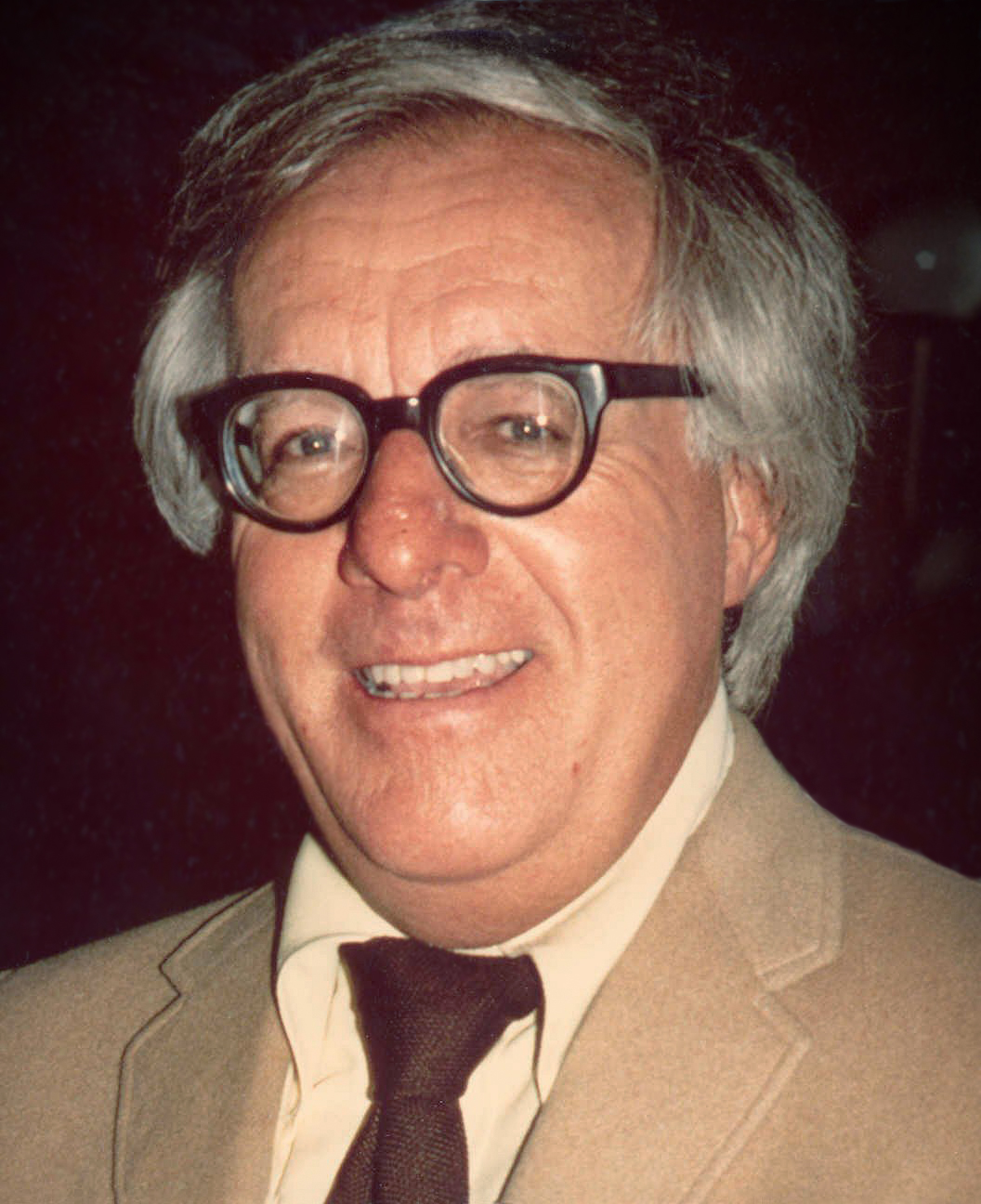
Ray Bradbury

- June 2
  - Richard Dawson, British-born American actor and television host (b. 1932)
  - Kathryn Joosten, American actress (b. 1939)
- June 5 – Ray Bradbury, writer (b. 1920)
- June 6 – Daniel Orr, economist, university professor and writer (b. 1933)
- June 7
  - John T. Cunningham, journalist and historian (b. 1915)
  - Cotton Owens, race car driver (b. 1924)
  - Lil Phat, rapper and murder victim (b. 1992)
  - J. Michael Riva, production designer and art director (b. 1948)
  - Bob Welch, musician (b. 1945)
- June 8
  - Pete Brennan, basketball player (b. 1936)
  - Frank Cady, actor. (b. 1915)
- June 11
  - Lee Allen, wrestler and coach (b. 1943)
  - Dave Boswell, baseball player (b. 1945)
  - Ann Rutherford, Canadian-born American actress (b. 1917)
  - Stay High 149, painter (b. 1950)
- June 12
  - Henry Hill, mobster (b. 1943)
  - Elinor Ostrom, Nobel economist (b. 1933)
- June 13 – William Standish Knowles, Nobel chemist (b. 1917)
- June 14 – Yvette Wilson, actress and comedian (b. 1964)
- June 16 – Susan Tyrrell, actress (b. 1945)
- June 17 – Rodney King, convicted criminal and police brutality victim (b. 1965)
- June 19 – Richard Lynch, actor (b. 1940)
- June 20
  - Judy Agnew, wife of Spiro Agnew, Second Lady of the United States (b. 1921)
  - Robert J. Kelleher, tennis player and judge (b. 1913)
  - LeRoy Neiman, artist (b. 1921)
  - Andrew Sarris, critic (b. 1928)
- June 23 – Walter J. Zable, founder and CEO of Cubic Corporation (b. 1915)
- June 26
  - Nora Ephron, screenwriter, film producer, director, and wife of Carl Bernstein (b. 1941)
  - Doris Singleton, actress (b. 1919)
- June 27 – Don Grady, actor, composer, and musician (b. 1944)

=== July ===
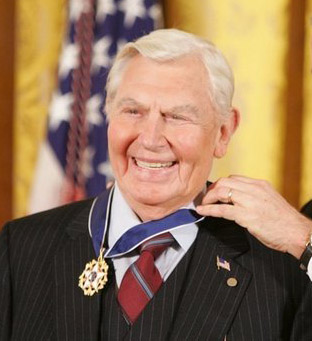
Andy Griffith

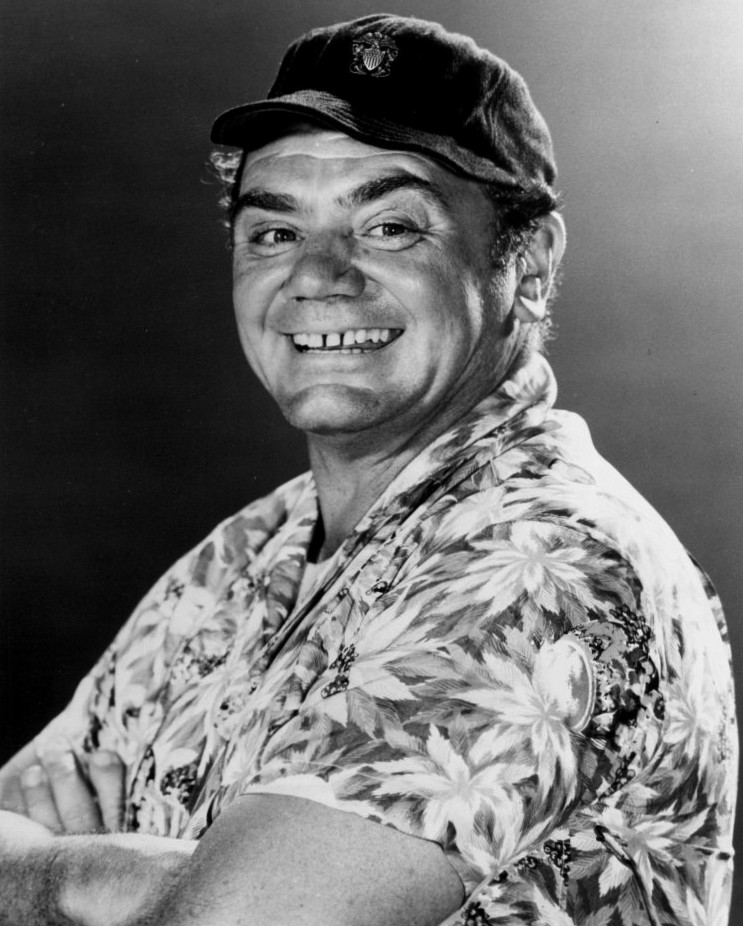
Ernest Borgnine

- July 1 – Alan G. Poindexter, American astronaut (b. 1961)
- July 2 – Ben Davidson, American football player (b. 1940)
- July 3
  - Andy Griffith, American actor (b. 1926)
  - Hollie Stevens, American pornographic actress and model (b. 1982)
- July 4
  - Jimmy Bivins, boxer (b. 1919)
  - Scamper, racehorse (b. 1977)
- July 5 – Louis B. Kahn, American computer scientist and statistician (b. 1918)
- July 8 – Ernest Borgnine, American actor (b. 1917)
- July 11
  - Art Ceccarelli, baseball player and coach (born 1930)
  - Marion Cunningham, author (born 1922)
  - Richard Scudder, journalist and publisher who co-founded MediaNews Group (born 1913)
  - Donald J. Sobol, soldier and author (born 1924)
  - Marvin Traub, businessman and author (born 1925)
- July 13
  - Sage Stallone, actor, son of Sylvester Stallone (b. 1976)
  - Ginny Tyler, voice actress (b. 1925)
  - Richard D. Zanuck, film producer (Driving Miss Daisy) (b. 1934)
- July 15 – Celeste Holm, actress (b. 1917)
- July 16
  - William Asher, American television and film producer, director, screenwriter (b. 1921)
  - Stephen Covey, American author (b. 1932)
  - Kitty Wells, American country music singer (b. 1919)
- July 19 – Tom Davis, comedian and writer (b. 1952)
- July 22
  - Jim Carlen, American football player and coach (b. 1933)
  - Ed Stevens, baseball player and coach (b. 1925)
- July 23 – Sally Ride, first American woman in space (born 1951)
- July 24
  - Chad Everett, American actor (b. 1937)
  - Sherman Hemsley, American actor (b. 1938)
- July 26 – Lupe Ontiveros, American actress (b. 1942)
- July 27
  - Norman Alden, actor (b. 1924)
  - R. G. Armstrong, actor and playwright (b. 1917)
  - Tony Martin, singer and husband of Cyd Charisse (b. 1913)
- July 31 – Gore Vidal, writer (b. 1925)

=== August ===
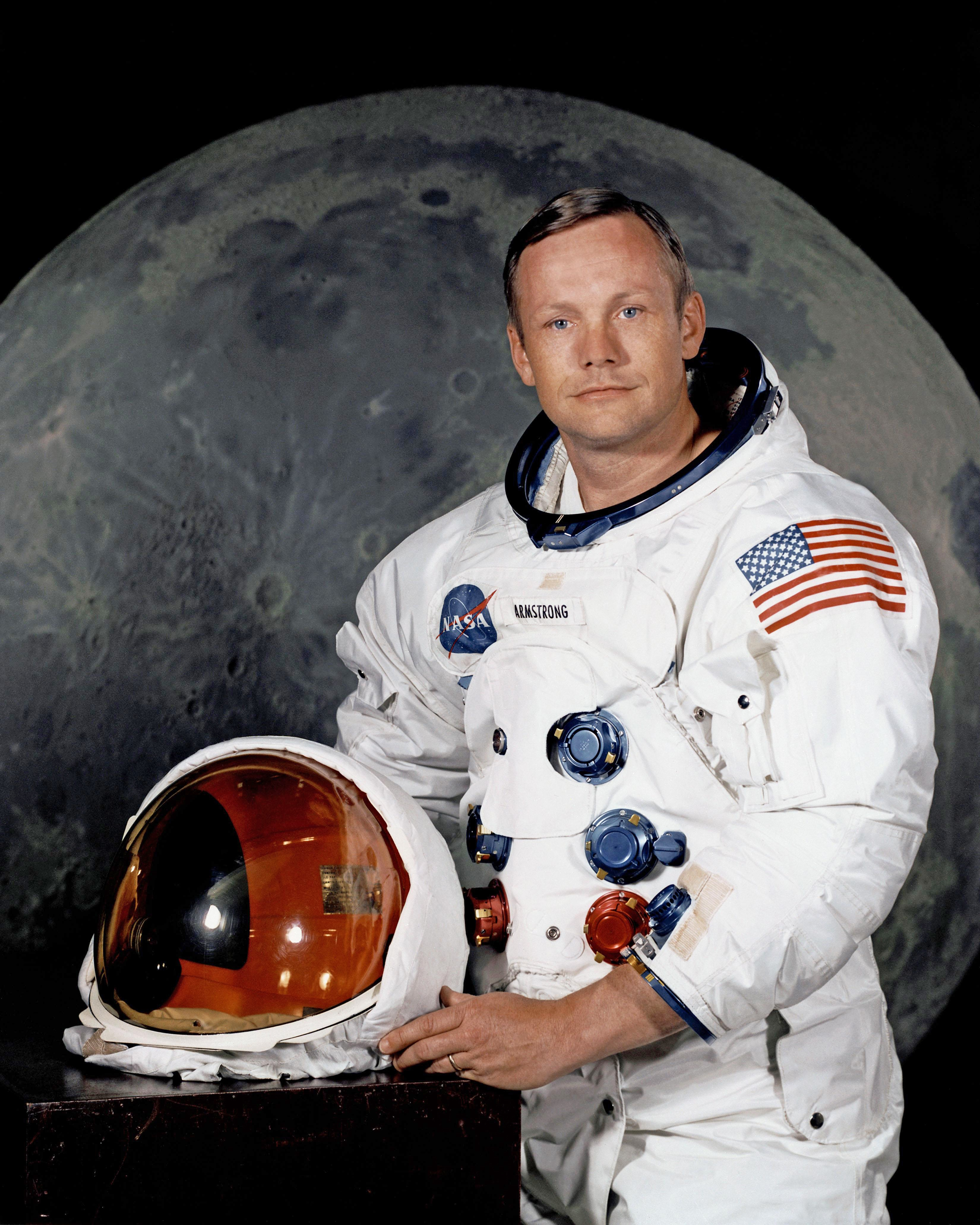
Neil Armstrong

- August 2 – Jimmy Jones, singer-songwriter (b. 1930)
- August 6 – Marvin Hamlisch, composer and conductor (b. 1944)
- August 7 – Judith Crist, film critic and academic
- August 9 – Al Freeman Jr., actor (b. 1934)
- August 10 – Irving Fein, television and film producer (b. 1911)
- August 11 – Michael Dokes, professional boxer (b. 1958)
- August 12 – Joe Kubert, comic book artist and teacher (b. 1926)
- August 13 – Helen Gurley Brown (b. 1922)
- August 14
  - Ron Palillo, American actor and teacher (b. 1949)
  - Phyllis Thaxter, actress (b. 1919)
- August 15
  - Bob Birch, American musician (b. 1956)
  - Harry Harrison, American author (b. 1925)
- August 16 – William Windom, American actor (b. 1923)
- August 18 – Scott McKenzie, American singer and songwriter (b. 1939)
- August 19 – Tony Scott, British director, died in Los Angeles, California (b. 1944)
- August 20 – Phyllis Diller, comedian and actress (b. 1917)
- August 23 – Jerry Nelson, puppeteer (b. 1934)
- August 24 – Steve Franken, actor (b. 1932)
- August 25 – Neil Armstrong, astronaut and first human to walk on another celestial body (b. 1930)

=== September ===
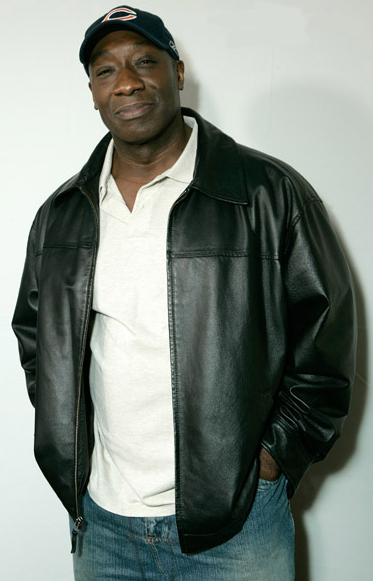
Michael Clarke Duncan

- September 1 – Hal David, lyricist (b. 1921)
- September 2 – Jack Boucher, photographer (b. 1931)
- September 3
  - Bob DiPietro, American baseball player (b. 1927)
  - Michael Clarke Duncan, American actor (b. 1957)
- September 5 – Joe South, musician, songwriter, and record producer (b. 1940)
- September 7 – Heriberto Lazcano Lazcano, Mexican drug kingpin, died in Sabinas, Coahuila, Mexico (b. 1974)
- September 8 – Thomas Szasz, Hungarian-American psychiatrist (b. 1920)
- September 10 – Vondell Darr, American actress (b. 1919)
- September 11
  - J. Christopher Stevens, American diplomat (b. 1960)
  - Sean Smith, diplomat (b. 1978)
- September 14 – Stephen Dunham, American actor (b. 1964)
- September 15 – James "Sugar Boy" Crawford, American R&B musician (b. 1934)
- September 16
  - Julien J. LeBourgeois, American vice admiral (b. 1923)
  - John Ingle, American actor (b. 1928)
- September 18 – Steve Sabol, American filmmaker (b. 1942)
- September 20 – Richard H. Cracroft, American author and professor (b. 1936)
- September 23 – Albert Henry Ottenweller, American Roman Catholic bishop (d. 2012)
- September 25 – Andy Williams, singer and television host (b. 1927)
- September 26 – Johnny Lewis, American actor (b. 1983)
- September 28 – Michael O'Hare, American actor (b. 1952)

=== October ===
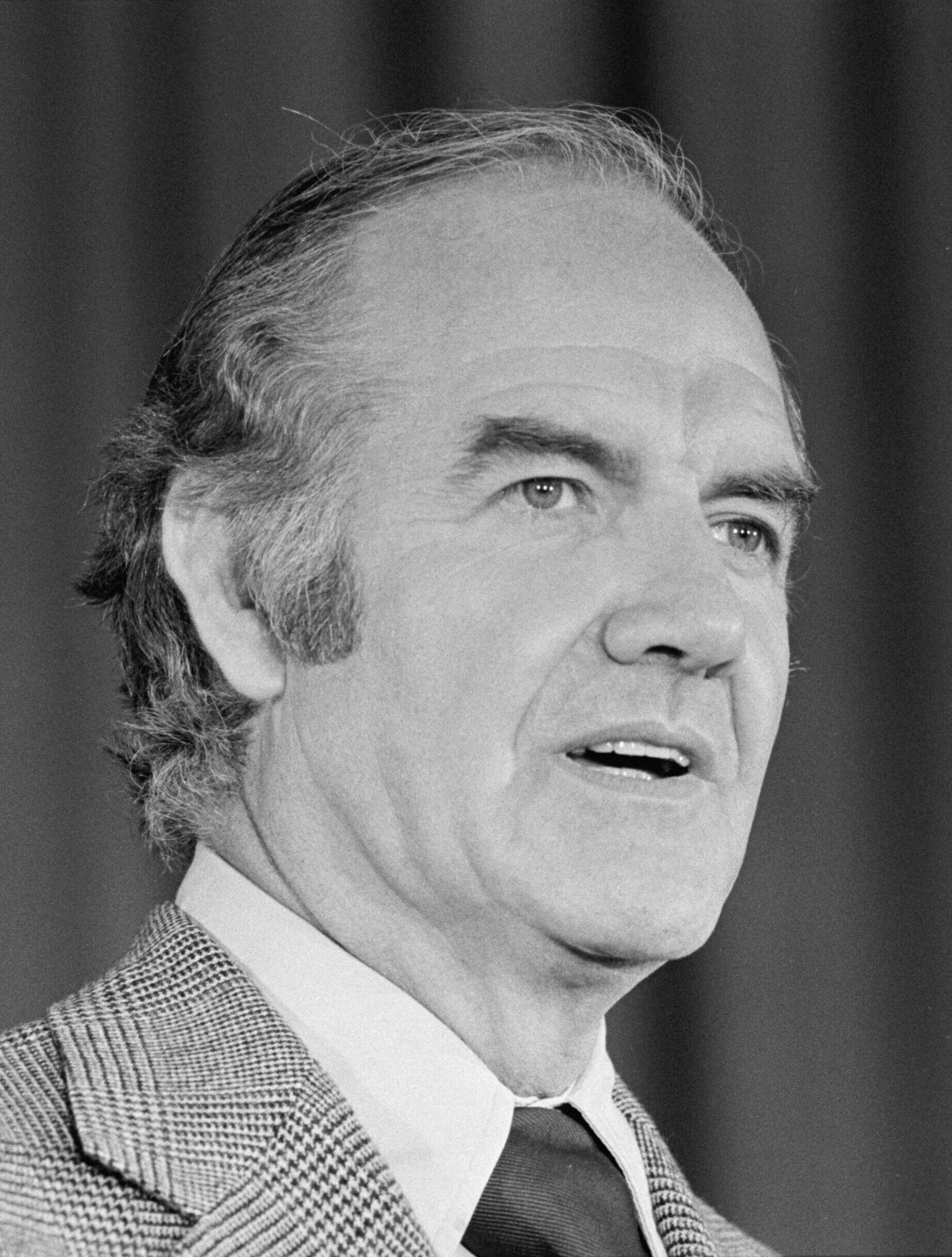
George McGovern

- October 8 – Ken Sansom, actor (b. 1927)
- October 9 – Sammi Kane Kraft, American child actress (b. 1992)
- October 10 – Alex Karras, American football player, professional wrestler and actor (b. 1935)
- October 13 – Gary Collins, actor and television host (b. 1938)
- October 14 – Arlen Specter, American politician (b. 1930)
- October 20 – E. Donnall Thomas, American Nobel physician (b. 1920)
- October 21 – George McGovern, American politician, historian, and author (b. 1922)
- October 22 – Russell Means, American Sioux actor and activist (b. 1939)
- October 24 – Margaret Osborne duPont, American tennis player (b. 1918)
- October 25 – Emmanuel Steward, professional boxer, trainer, and commentator (b. 1944)
- October 26 – Natina Reed, American musician and actress (b. 1980)
- October 28
  - Merry Anders, actress (b. 1934)
  - Bob Brunner, screenwriter and producer (b. 1934)
- October 31
  - John Fitch, racecar driver and inventor (b. 1917)
  - John H. Reed, 67th Governor of Maine from 1959 until 1967. (b. 1921)

=== November ===
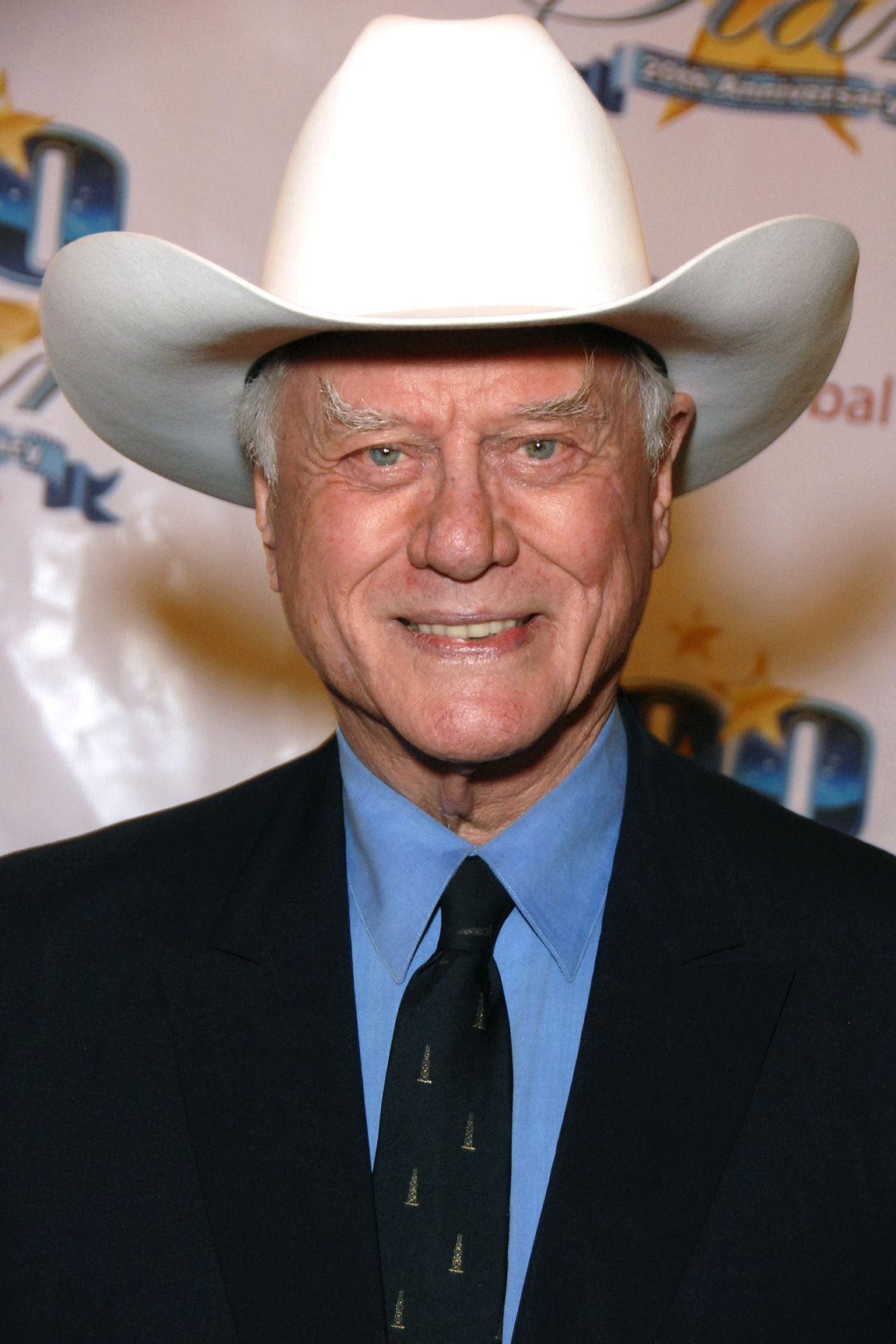
Larry Hagman

- November 1 – Mitch Lucker, musician, singer, and songwriter (b. 1984)
- November 2 – Milt Campbell, track and field athlete (b. 1933)
- November 5 – Elliott Carter, composer (b. 1908)
- November 7
  - Carmen Basilio, boxer (b. 1927)
  - Cleve Duncan, singer (b. 1935)
  - Darrell Royal, American college football player and coach (b. 1924)
- November 8 – Lee MacPhail, American baseball executive (b. 1917)
- November 9
  - Major Harris, singer (b. 1947)
  - James L. Stone, soldier (b. 1922)
- November 13
  - Will Barnet, painter and illustrator (b. 1911)
  - Ray Zone, historian, author and illustrator (b. 1947)
- November 14 – Gail Harris, American baseball player (b. 1931)
- November 21
  - Austin Peralta, American jazz musician and composer (b. 1990)
  - Deborah Raffin, actress, model, and publisher (b. 1953)
- November 23 – Larry Hagman, actor (b. 1931)
- November 24 – Héctor Camacho, Puerto Rican boxer (b. 1962)
- November 25
  - Jim Temp, American football player and businessman (b. 1933)
  - Earl Carroll, singer (b. 1937)
- November 26
  - Joseph Murray, American Nobel surgeon (b. 1919)
  - Martin Richards, film producer (b. 1932)
- November 27 – Marvin Miller, American baseball players' union executive (b. 1917)
- November 28 – Zig Ziglar, author, salesman, and motivational speaker (b. 1926)

=== December ===
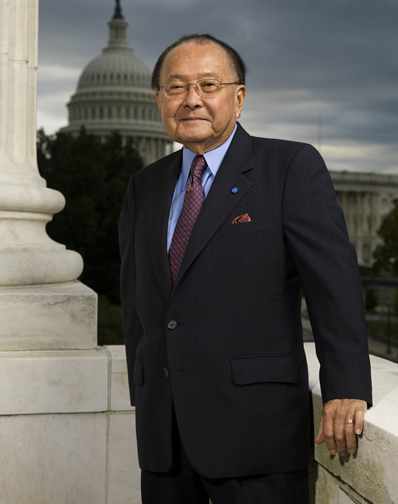
Daniel Inouye

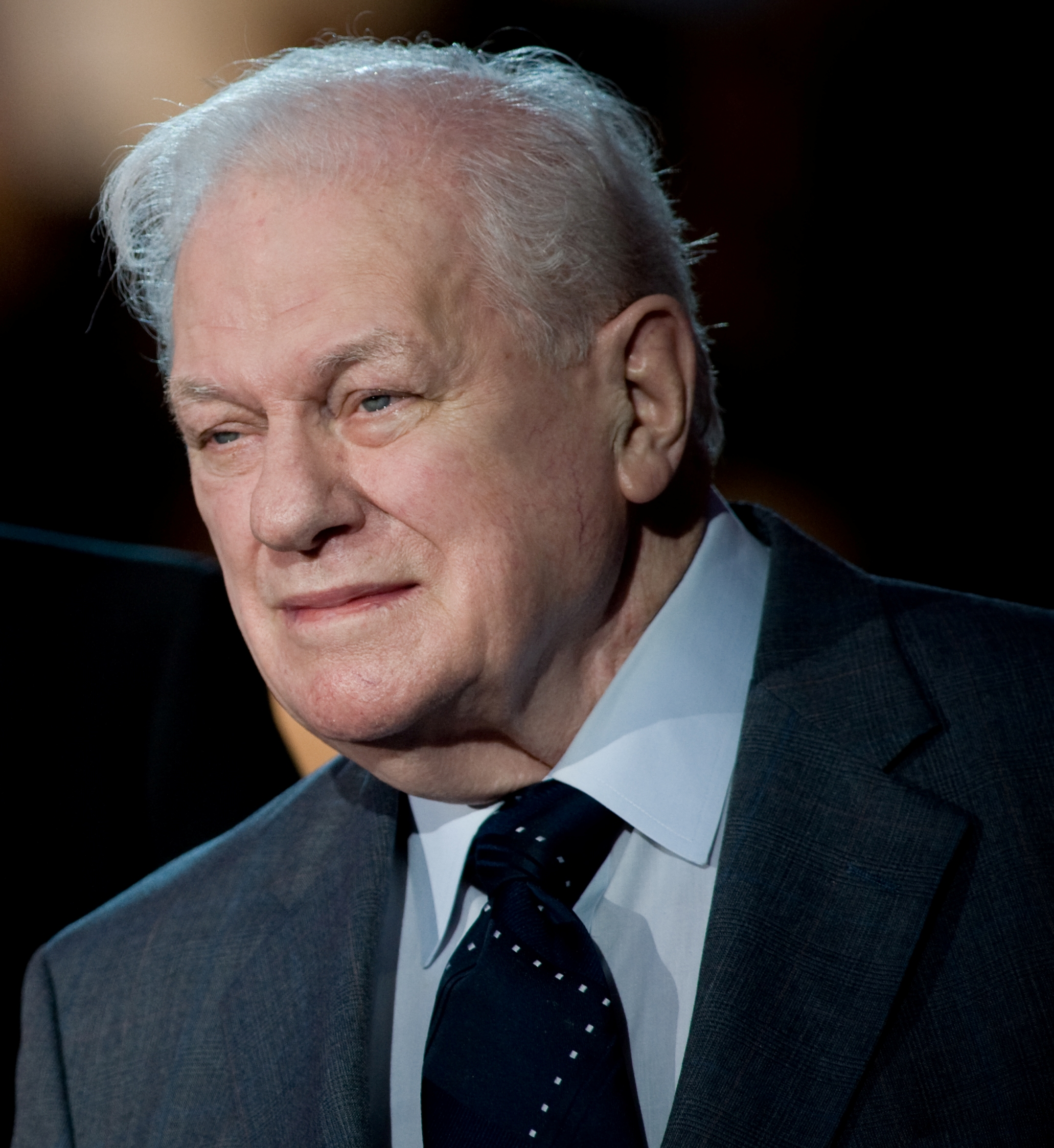
Charles Durning

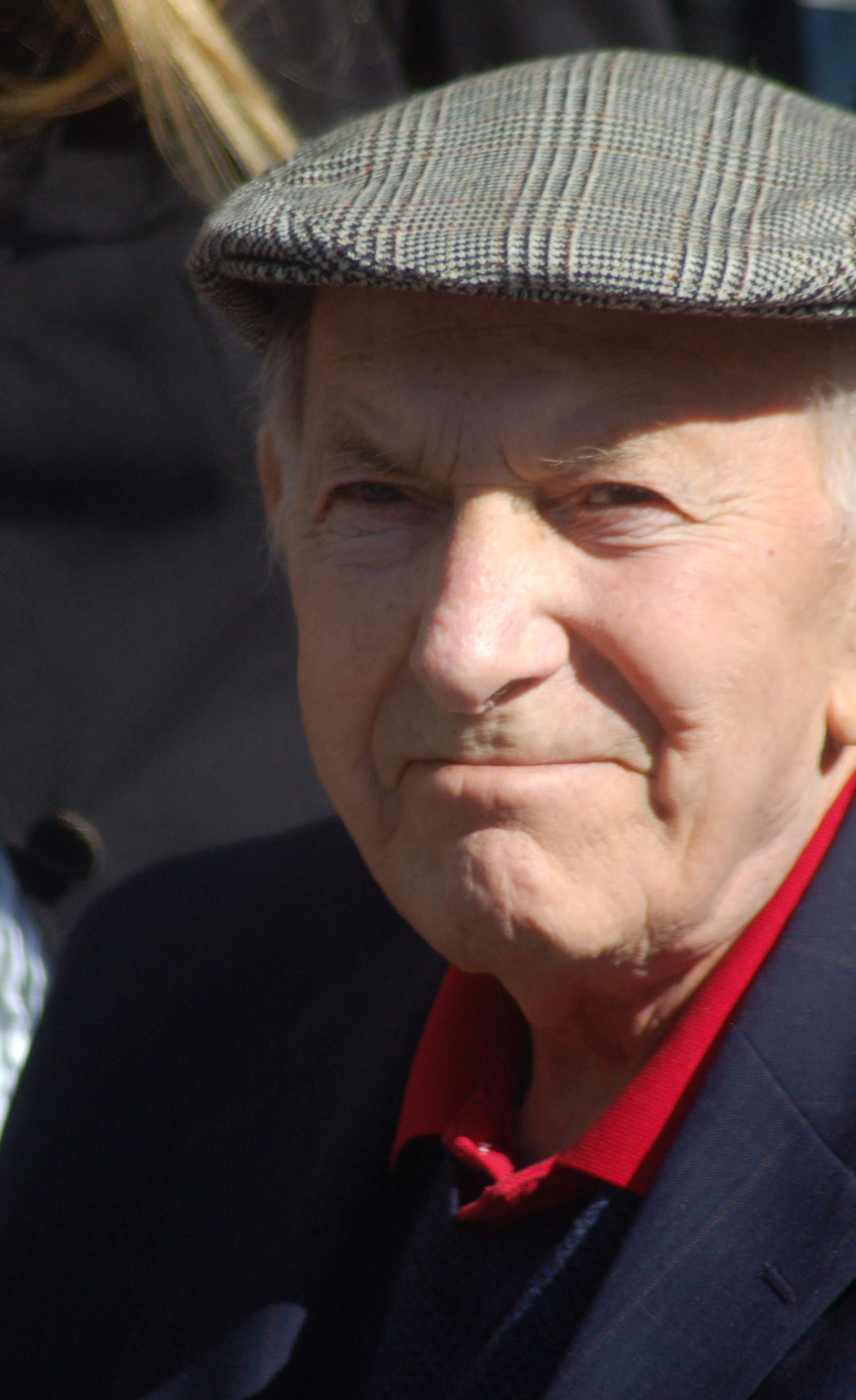
Jack Klugman

- December 1 – Jovan Belcher, American football player and murderer (b. 1987)
- December 2 – Israel Keyes, murderer (b. 1978)
- December 4 – Besse Cooper, 8th oldest verified person ever (b. 1896)
- December 5 – Dave Brubeck, pianist (b. 1920)
- December 7
  - Ralph Parr, Air Force pilot (b. 1924)
  - Joseph R. Weisberger, Chief Justice for Rhode Island from 1993 until 2000. (b. 1920)
- December 9
  - Jenni Rivera, singer, songwriter, and actress, died in Iturbide, Nuevo León, Mexico (b. 1969)
  - Charles Rosen, pianist (b. 1927)
- December 10
  - Johnny Lira, boxer (b. 1951)
  - Bob Munden, exhibition shooter (b. 1942)
  - Bill Parkyn, scientist (b. 1944)
  - Paul Rauch, television producer (b. 1934)
- December 11
  - Albert O. Hirschman, German-born American economist (b. 1915)
  - Ravi Shankar, Indian musician and composer, died in San Diego, California (b. 1920)
  - Colleen Walker, golfer (b. 1956)
- December 14
  - Victoria Leigh Soto, teacher, Sandy Hook Elementary School shooting victim (b. 1985)
  - Adam Lanza, mass murderer (b. 1992)
- December 17 – Daniel Inouye, American politician (b. 1924)
- December 19 – Robert Bork, conservative law professor (b. 1927)
- December 21
  - Vivian Anderson, baseball player (b. 1921)
  - Boyd Bartley, baseball player (b. 1920)
- December 23 – Capital STEEZ, rapper (b. 1993)
- December 24
  - Charles Durning, American actor (b. 1923)
  - Jack Klugman, American actor (b. 1922)
- December 26 – Fontella Bass, singer and songwriter (b. 1940)
- December 27
  - Harry Carey Jr., actor and son of Harry Carey (b. 1921)
  - Norman Schwarzkopf Jr., army general (b. 1934)
- December 29
  - Ruth Ann Steinhagen, notable criminal (b. 1929)
  - Mike Auldridge, musician (b. 1938)
- December 30 – Rita Levi-Montalcini, Italian Nobel neurologist, died in Rome, Italy (b. 1909)

== See also ==
- 2012 in American music
- 2012 in American soccer
- 2012 in American television
- List of American films of 2012
- Timeline of United States history (2010–present)
