= Daniel Orr =

American economist (1933–2012)

- Born: May 13, 1933
- Died: June 6, 2012 (aged 79)
- Years active: 1960–1999

Daniel Orr (May 13, 1933 – June 6, 2012) was an economist. He was a Princeton University Ph.D, and the retired economics chair at the University of Illinois at Urbana-Champaign. He was a published author in the field of economics, especially in academic circles, and has worked for the United States Treasury Department. He became Trustee of Oberlin College in 1993.

== Education ==
He graduated from Oberlin College in 1954. Later, he received a Ph.D. in economics and sociology from Princeton University in 1960.

== Teaching ==
His teaching career began at Amherst College and moved to the University of Chicago Business School. In 1966, he moved to the newest campus of the University of California at San Diego to start building an economics department. He became chair of the Economic Department for ten years. Then, in 1978, he moved to Virginia Polytechnic Institute in Blacksburg as the department chair. There he successfully assembled a top-rated economics faculty. His last move was in 1989 to become chair of the economics department at the University of Illinois in Champaign-Urbana, from which he retired in 1999.

== Personal life ==
He spent early childhood in New York, Wisconsin, North Carolina and Tennessee. He married Mary Lee and was a father of three children: Rebecca, Matthew and Sara. His daughter, Rebecca Orr, was an Oberlin College freshman who was killed in an accident in the spring of 1982. The family established the Rebecca Cary Orr Memorial Prize in Mathematics to award on the basis of outstanding achievement in undergraduate mathematics and promise of future professional accomplishment.

Orr, an admirer of Adlai Stevenson in his younger days, became a staunch conservative and Republican for most of his years. He was a member of the Scholars for 9/11 Truth, and believed the Collapse of the World Trade Center was caused by explosives.

== Publications ==
- “Stochastic Reserve Losses and Expansion of Bank Credit” (with W.G. Mellon), American Economic Review (September, 1961)
- "A Random Walk Production-Inventory Policy: Rationale and Implementation", Management Science, Vol. 9, No. 1 (Oct., 1962)
- "A Stochastic Income Model Using Optimal Inventory Rules", The Review of Economic Studies Vol. 30, No. 2 (Jun., 1963)
- "An Application of Control-Limit Models to the Management of Corporate Cash Balances" (with Daniel Orr), in Proceedings of the Conference on Financial Research and Its Implications for Management, Stanford University (June 9–11, 1966).
- "A Model of the Demand for Money by Firms" (with Merton H. Miller), Quarterly Journal of Economics (August 1966).
- "The Demand for Money by Firms: Extensions of Analytical Results" (with Merton H. Miller), Journal of Finance (December 1968).
- "A Note on the Uselessness of Transaction Demand Models", The Journal of Finance (December 1974)
- "The Superiority of Comparative Negligence: Another Vote," Journal of Legal Studies, Vol. 20 (1991).
- "Reflections on the Hiring of Faculty", American Economic Review, Vol. 83, No. 2 (1993).
- "The Role of Trust and the Law in Privatization," with T. S. Ulen, in "Latin America: Privatization, Property Rights and Deregulation I", Special Issue of the Quarterly Review of Economics and Finance, Vol. 33 (1993).
