= Minneapolis firm shooting =

2012 mass shooting in Minnesota, U.S.

- Location: 44°58′38″N 93°18′38″W; 2322 Chestnut Avenue West, Minneapolis, Minnesota, US
- Date: September 27, 2012; 4:30 – c. 4:35 p.m. (ET)
- Target: Employees at the Accent Signage Systems firm's building
- Attack type: Mass murder; murder-suicide; mass shooting
- Weapon: 9mm Glock 19 semi-automatic pistol
- Deaths: 7 (including the perpetrator)
- Injuries: 2
- Perpetrator: Andrew John Engeldinger
- Motive: Employment termination

A mass shooting occurred at a firm in Minneapolis, Minnesota, United States, on the afternoon of September 27, 2012. The attack took place inside Accent Signage Systems, where a former employee walked into the firm's building and fired a Glock 19 pistol. By the end of the day, five people were dead, including the gunman who committed suicide, and four others were injured, three of them critically. One of those critically injured died the following day, and another man succumbed to his wounds on October 10. It was the deadliest workplace shooting in Minnesota's history.

== Details ==
The shooting took place at Accent Signage Systems, a sign-making business located in the Bryn Mawr neighborhood of Minneapolis, which is bisected by Interstate 394. Andrew John Engeldinger, an employee of the firm, was called over to the office of operations director John Souter. Before going to the executive offices, Engeldinger first went to his car, apparently to retrieve a Glock 19 9mm handgun. When he was informed by Souter that he was losing his job, Engeldinger responded with "Oh, really?" and took out the handgun from his holster. A struggle over the handgun ensued between Engeldinger, Souter, and top manager Rami Cooks; gunshots severely wounded Souter and fatally wounded Cooks. Engeldinger then left Souter's office, shooting and killing company founder Reuven Rahamim, who was stepping out of his office, which was next to Souter's. He then left the executive offices and entered a sign-display area, killing Jacob Beneke, an employee from Maple Grove. Engeldinger then moved on to the loading dock area, where he shot and killed a second employee, Ronald Edberg of Brooklyn Center. He also killed Keith Basinski, a UPS driver who was on a delivery, as he was seated in his truck. Engeldinger then entered the production floor and continued firing, fatally wounding production manager Eric Rivers and grazing another employee.

The first 911 phone calls made from the business were at 4:35 p.m., when someone called in saying gunshots were being fired. The first officers that arrived on scene managed to escort some people out of the building during the assault. Engeldinger killed four people at the scene. Another victim died the next day. Three others were treated at Hennepin County Medical Center, two of them for critical injuries; one of these victims died on October 10. Engeldinger died from a self-inflicted gunshot wound in a warehouse in the workplace's basement.

The shooter fired off at least 46 bullets during the attack.

=== Victims ===
Six victims (not including the perpetrator) were killed in the shooting, four at the scene and the fifth dying in a hospital the following day. They are: Reuven Rahamim, 61, the founder of the company; a UPS driver who had initially been on a delivery, Keith Basinski, 50; Rami Cooks, 62, a top manager; and employees Ronald Edberg, 58, and Jacob Beneke, 34. A sixth fatal victim, production manager Eric Rivers, 42, died on October 10, having been taken off life support when he succumbed to his wounds.

Another company executive, director of operations John Souter, was in critical condition as of September 28. A person who was in stable condition after the shooting was treated at Hennepin County Medical Center for a graze wound and released on September 28; this surviving victim was identified as Battites Wesley.

== Perpetrator ==
Andrew John Engeldinger (January 27, 1976 – September 27, 2012), a 36-year-old resident of Minneapolis for twelve years, was raised in Richfield, Minnesota and graduated from the Academy of Holy Angels. He was formerly employed by Accent Signage Systems, but recently fired from the business. According to neighbors, Engeldinger was a loner who never engaged in conversation with anyone, while a former coworker described him as not eating lunch or taking breaks with other employees. Engeldinger's parents and other family stated that he had some sort of mental illness and resisted treatment, eventually becoming estranged. Authorities said there were clear indications he may have targeted certain people. A search of his home uncovered packaging for 10,000 rounds, indicating that he was heavily armed and had practiced shooting quite a bit.

== Response ==
Governor Mark Dayton described the shooting as "senseless," and said that "there is no place for it anywhere in Minnesota." Minneapolis Mayor R. T. Rybak visited Accent Signage along with U.S. Representative Keith Ellison not long before the shooting. Rybak stated that, "we are deeply sorry about what has happened here," and adding that it was "a horrible tragedy."
