= General Revenue Corporation =

- Company type: Subsidiary
- Industry: Collection agency
- Founded: Cincinnati, Ohio, U.S. (1981)
- Founder: Myron D. Rowland; Bob Lawhorn
- Headquarters: Cincinnati, Ohio, U.S.
- Key people: Myron D. Rowland Co-founder; James A. Reed President and COO; Bob Lawhorn Co-founder; Robert G. Hacker CFO; Jeff Wilmington CAO
- Number of employees: 1,300
- Parent: SLM
- Subsidiaries: Pioneer Credit, Arrow Financial Services, Student Assistance Corporation
- Website: GeneralRevenue.com

General Revenue Corporation is a United States debt-recovery organization that specializes in the recovery of defaulted student loans and consumer loans. GRC is a subsidiary of SinglePoint Group International.
