= Kissing Shakespeare =

2012 novel by Pamela Mingle

- Author: Pamela Mingle
- Language: English
- Subject: Time travel, adolescent sexuality
- Genre: Young adult literature, romance, historical fiction, fantasy
- Publisher: Delacorte Books
- Publication date: August 14, 2012
- Publication place: United States
- Media type: (hardcover)
- Pages: 340
- ISBN: 978-0-385-74196-5

Kissing Shakespeare is a debut novel of a former American teacher and librarian-turned-writer Pamela Mingle. It was published as a young adult literature book on August 14, 2012, by Delacorte Books. There are no records of William Shakespeare's life between his birth in 1564 to his arrival in London in 1590, although he was speculated to be a schoolteacher before becoming a playwright. Mingle's novel sets during what historians referred as Shakespeare's "lost years," using clues from the 1580s, to create a romantic fantasy centering on a love triangle composed of a contemporary teenage girl from the 21st century, a time traveler from the past, and William Shakespeare. Mingle remains true to the history and events of the era, revealing the challenges of living in a time of religious persecution and suppression of women.

== Premise ==
American teenager Miranda Graham believes that she has Shakespeare in her genes: she hopes one day to follow her parents’ footsteps as a Shakespearean actress. After her disastrous performance in her school's staging of The Taming of the Shrew, her fellow cast member, Stephen Langford, steps out of the backstage and asks if she'd like to meet William Shakespeare in person. Miranda thinks he's insane. But before she can object, Stephen uses a spell to magically transport them both back to 16th century England–the time period Stephen is actually from, in the year 1581, at Lancashire. He wants Miranda to use her acting skills and modern-day charms on a teenage Shakespeare. Without her help, Stephen claims, the world will lose its greatest playwright.

Miranda isn't convinced she's the girl for the job. Reluctantly, she agrees to help, as Stephen agrees that once they've completed their mission, Stephen will send her back to the moment they've left. Stephen had Miranda taking his sister Olivia's identity, and lives with his uncle and aunt. Stephen's uncle and aunt, Alexander and Elizabeth Hoghtons, don't realize that Miranda is not their niece because Stephen's family had not been in contact with them in years due to feuds, and Miranda resembles Olivia. During lunch with the Hoghtons and their guests, Miranda meets the young Shakespeare, who is hired as a headmaster for children. During dinner, Stephen help Miranda adjust to life in the 16th century, even teaching her how to dance. William later dances with Miranda, and offers to teach her poetry. Miranda finds herself attracted to both Stephen and William afterward.

On the following day, William reveals a desire to become an actor. However, after witnessing a religious execution, Miranda learns from Stephen that current events could prevent William from pursuing his dreams, and force him to take a different path in life as a Jesuit instead. If William Shakespeare joins the Catholic Church under the urging of the Jesuits' leader Thomas Cook, he would likely be persecuted and put to death, thus endangering Miranda's timeline. Stephen proposes that Miranda seduce Shakespeare, causing him to lose his virtue so that the church would not be able to recruit him....

== Reception ==
According to Lara Avery, "Mingle makes good use of Shakespeare's 'lost years' as she weaves an improbable but no less fascinating story of a contemporary young woman coping with the harsh yet courtly conditions of rural sixteenth-century England." O'Malley also claims that "this novel is definitely a cut above the typical teen romance." While Kirkus found that "The only thing that’s not predictable about this time-travel romance is its exceptionally silly premise." and "...this offering achieves only inanity."

== Awards ==
- Runner-up - 2013 Colorado Romance Writers Award of Excellence Young Adult with Romantic Elements
- Winner - 2013 Colorado Authors' League Book-length Middle Grade/Young Adult Fiction
- Winner - 2013 Colorado Book Award Young Adult Literature
