= Louis B. Kahn =

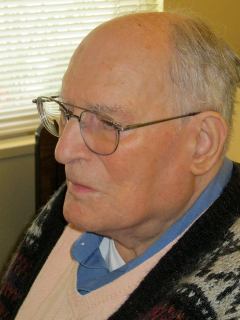
- Louis B. Kahn in 2010
- Born: May 9, 1918
- Died: July 5, 2012 (aged 94)

Louis B. Kahn (May 9, 1918 – July 5, 2012) was an American computer scientist and statistician. Kahn was born in Chicago, Illinois, to Hungarian and Latvian parents.

== Education ==
Kahn received a Bachelor of Science degree in applied science and economics from the Illinois Institute of Technology in 1940. After receiving a Certificate of Metallurgy from the University of Manchester School of Technology in 1945, he received a Master of Science degree in statistics, economics and mathematics, and a Ph.D. in statistics from the University of Wisconsin in 1948 and 1951, respectively.

== Career ==
In 1959, he was one of 10 leading pioneers in the application of statistics using electronic computers, and he presented the Queen of the United Kingdom with a statistical paper that he read to the Royal Statistical Society. He fought in World War II in the 9th Infantry Division in Germany as 1st Lieutenant and was honored the Purple Heart, 2 Bronze Stars and 3 Service stars.

Prof. Kahn's Ph.D. thesis was published as a book entitled A Study of Productivity and Its Measurement in 1951. Prof. Kahn co-authored a book entitled Logistics Papers with J.E. Hamilton in 1956. He also authored a paper entitled "A Statistical Model for Evaluating the Reliability of Safety Systems for Plants Manufacturing Hazardous Products" in 1959.

In 1961, the Shell Development Company in Emeryville, California appointed Louis B. Kahn the editor of a new journal, The Logistics Review and Military Logistics Journal. The publication was the official journal of the Military Logistics Society. In January 1962, shortly after becoming associate professor of Operations Research at the U.S. Naval Postgraduate School in Monterey, California, he suffered a debilitating cerebral hemorrhage, which severely & permanently impeded his speech & overall mobility. His doctors initially predicted that he would only live 10 days. Yet later in 1962, Professor Kahn was able to start his own company in Berkeley, California called Technical Economics, Inc. As president of the company, Dr. Kahn was the computer application specialist, developing proprietary computer programs. As president, he was also a consulting statistician at the Neurosurgery Department of the University of California Medical Center, San Francisco, California. He was the principal editor of The Logistics Review and Military Logistics Journal as well as the principal editor of The Journal of Biomedical Systems. He also was the founder and assistant editor of The Logistics and Transportation Review. In addition, he was on the editorial advisory board of the publication entitled Current Contents, Life Sciences.

== Death ==
Prof. Kahn died on July 5, 2012, at Chaparral Skilled Nursing in Berkeley, California from complications due to old age. An obituary was published on April 27, 2013, in the Oakland Tribune.
