= List of people from Terre Haute, Indiana =

This is a list of the people born in, residents of, or otherwise closely associated with the city of Terre Haute, Indiana, and its surrounding metropolitan area.

== Actors and actresses ==
- Wally Bruner – actor, television personality
- Jose Pablo Cantillo – movies, television
- Benjamin Scatman Crothers – musician, movies, television
- Dorothy Dalton – theatre, movies
- Johnnie "Scat" Davis – musician, bandleader, movies
- Richard "Skeets" Gallagher – vaudeville, theatre, movies
- Jess Hahn – French movies
- Chubby Johnson – movies, television
- Grover Jones – screenwriter, producer, director, author
- Joe Keaton – vaudeville, movies; father of actor Buster Keaton
- Billy Lee – child film star
- Dave Madden – movies, television; The Partridge Family
- Rose Melville – actor, vaudeville, movies
- Alvy Moore – movies, television – Green Acres
- Maurice Ransford – motion pictures art director
- Edward Roseman – vaudeville, movies
- Valeska Suratt – theater, silent movies, vaudeville
- Bill Thompson – voice actor, Fibber McGee and Molly
- Jerry Van Dyke – television, movies
- Stuart Vaughn – actor, award-winning director, Obie Award, Drama Desk Award
- Hunter von Leer – movies

== Artists ==
- Mick Mars - Mötley Crüe
- Amalia Küssner Coudert – miniaturist
- John Rogers Cox – painter
- Ray H. French – printmaker
- John "Dok" Hager – cartoonist
- Harriet Goodhue Hosmer – sculptor
- Bryan Hunt – sculptor
- Edith Pfau – painter, sculptor, art educator
- Janet Scudder – sculptor
- D. Omer Seamon – painter
- Gilbert Brown Wilson – artist, muralist, motion pictures

== Athletes ==
- Vic Aldridge – baseball
- Ray Arcel – boxing trainer, International Boxing Hall of Fame
- Clint Barmes – baseball
- Armon Bassett – basketball player with Ironi Ramat Gan of Israel
- Bruce Baumgartner – wrestling, James E. Sullivan Award winner, U.S. Olympic gold medalist
- Greg Bell – track and field; U.S. Olympic gold medalist
- Shakir Bell – college and CFL football
- Junius Bibbs – African-American college football and baseball player; professional baseball player in the Negro leagues
- Larry Bird – basketball player, coach, NBA executive
- Mordecai Brown – baseball, National Baseball Hall of Fame
- Cheryl Bridges – cross country and track; held the World Record in the marathon and US records in 3 mile and 5,000 meter
- Bill Butland – baseball
- Cam Cameron – football, college and NFL football coach
- Max Carey – baseball, National Baseball Hall of Fame
- Barry Collier – basketball coach, athletic administrator
- Bruce Connatser – professional baseball
- Roger Counsil – swimmer, gymnastics coach
- Glenn M. Curtis – high school, college and pro basketball coach
- Josh Devore – baseball
- Terry Dischinger – basketball, U.S. Olympic gold medalist
- Brian Dorsett – baseball
- Jim Jumbo Elliott – baseball
- Danny Etling – football
- Brian Evans – basketball
- Bud Fowler – baseball
- Tiger Jack Fox – boxing
- Rufus Gilbert – baseball, coach
- Vencie Glenn – football
- Alex Graman – baseball
- Scott Haffner – basketball
- Frank Hamblen – basketball, NBA coach
- Russ Hathaway – football
- John Hazen – basketball
- Rick Heller – college baseball coach
- Aubrey Herring – track, hurdles, NCAA champion
- Eddie Hickey – basketball coach, Basketball Hall of Fame
- Bill Hodges – basketball coach
- Paul Humphrey – football
- Tunch Ilkin – college and NFL football
- Mark Jackson – football
- Tommy John – baseball
- Neil Johnston – baseball, basketball, Basketball Hall of Fame
- Doug Kay – football coach
- Bob King – basketball coach, administrator
- Duane Klueh – basketball, tennis, player, coach
- Greg Lansing – basketball coach
- Don Lash – Olympic track, Sullivan Award winner
- Danny Lazar – baseball
- Bob Slick Leonard – basketball, ABA and NBA coach, Basketball Hall of Fame
- Bryan Leturgez – track and field, Olympic bobsled
- Clyde Lovellette – basketball, U.S. Olympic gold medalist, Basketball Hall of Fame
- Curt Mallory – football, college coach
- Johnny Mann – baseball
- Wally Marks – athlete, athletic administrator Indiana State University
- Thad Matta – college basketball coach
- Tony McGee – football tight end
- Dave McGinnis – football, college and NFL coach
- Kevin McKenna – basketball, player, coach
- Trent Miles – football coach
- Rick Minter – football coach
- Erica Moore – track & field
- Paul Moss – two-time college All-American, NFL
- Albert "Cod" Myers – baseball
- Nancy Hanks – harness racing
- Art Nehf – baseball, pitched in four World Series
- Bill Nelson – baseball
- Steve Newton – basketball, player, coach
- Carl Nicks – basketball
- Greg Oden – basketball
- Jake Odum – basketball
- Brian Omogrosso – baseball
- Jake Petricka – baseball
- Jamie Petrowski – football
- Josh Phegley – baseball
- Dennis Raetz – football, player, coach
- Kurt Rambis – basketball, player, coach
- Rick Ray (basketball) – coach
- Colin Rea – baseball
- A. J. Reed – baseball player
- Cheryl Reeve – basketball coach, WNBA
- Mike Sanford – college football coach
- Dave Schellhase – basketball, player, coach
- Ed Seward – "Kid" Seward, baseball
- Dexter Shouse – basketball
- Zane Smith – baseball
- Gordon B. Stauffer – basketball coach
- Mitch Stetter – baseball
- Ace Stewart – baseball
- Ryan Strausborger – baseball
- Jerry Sturm – football
- Charles Bernard Bud Taylor – boxer, bantamweight champion, International Boxing Hall of Fame
- Harry Taylor – baseball
- Joe Thatcher – baseball
- Debi Thomas – world champion figure skater
- Kurt Thomas – gymnast, James E. Sullivan Award winner
- Anthony Thompson – football player
- Lyle Bud Tinning – baseball
- Paul Dizzy Trout – baseball
- Robert Bobby Turner – college and NFL player and coach
- Royce Waltman – college basketball coach
- Bob Warn – college baseball coach
- Steve Weatherford – football
- Mike Westhoff – college and NFL football coach
- John Wooden – basketball, Basketball Hall of Fame

== Military ==
- Charles G. Abrell – Medal of Honor, Korean War
- George W. Biegler – Medal of Honor, Philippine–American War
- Charles Cruft – teacher, newspaper publisher, lawyer, Union Civil War general
- William Henry Harrison – Governor Indiana Territory, commander of Fort Harrison, President of the United States
- Nick Popaditch – Gunnery Sergeant, USMC, Gulf War, Iraq War
- Peter J. Ryan – Medal of Honor, Civil War
- Josiah Snelling – military leader, commander of Fort Harrison
- John T. Sterling – Medal of Honor, Civil War
- William Maxwell Wood – naval surgeon, first Surgeon General

== Musicians ==
- Leo Baxter – musician, composer, band director
- Steven Caldwell – musician, folk singer
- Scatman Crothers – musician, actor
- Johnnie "Scat" Davis – singer, bandleader
- Paul Dresser – vaudeville actor, composer, "On The Banks of the Wabash, Far Away," "My Gal Sal"
- Edwin Franko Goldman – bandleader, composer
- Indiana Gregg – singer, songwriter
- Mick Mars – born Robert Alan Deal; Mötley Crüe guitarist
- Hank Roberts – jazz cellist, vocalist
- Claude Thornhill – pianist, arranger, bandleader, composer

== Politicians ==
- Simon Bamberger – governor of Utah
- Birch Bayh – U.S. Senator
- Evan Bayh – governor of Indiana and U.S. Senator
- Thomas H. Blake – U.S. Congressman, Commissioner of the U.S. Land Office, resident trustee of Wabash and Erie Canal
- Newton Booth – governor of California, U.S. Senator
- James Bopp – conservative attorney known for Citizens United v. FEC; Republican National Committeeman
- Joseph Gurney Cannon – Speaker of the United States House of Representatives
- P. Pete Chalos – four-term mayor of Terre Haute
- John G. Davis – U.S. Congressman
- John Wesley Davis – physician, Speaker of the United States House of Representatives, governor of the Oregon Territory
- Eugene Victor Debs (1855–1926) – Socialist candidate for president
- Joseph V. Graff – U.S. Congressman
- Abram A. Hammond – lieutenant governor of Indiana, governor of Indiana
- Edward A. Hannegan – U.S. Congressman, U.S. Senator, diplomat
- Arvin Singh - Secretary of Health, West Virginia Department of Health, West Virginia (March 13, 2025). "Secretary Arvin Singh Bio".
- Russell Benjamin Harrison – son of President Benjamin Harrison
- William H. Harrison – five-term U.S. Congressman
- Nicholas Hood – Detroit City Council member and Congregationalist minister
- Elisha Mills Huntington – attorney, federal judge, Commissioner of U.S. Land Office
- Virginia E. Jenckes – first U.S. Congresswoman from Indiana
- Brian Kerns – Republican Congressman
- John Edward Lamb – Congressman, political leader
- William Carr Lane – military surgeon, mayor St. Louis, governor New Mexico Territory
- Dick Thompson Morgan – author, U.S. Congressman
- John H. O'Neall – U.S. Congressman
- P.B.S. Pinchback – politician, governor of Louisiana
- Edward James Roye – merchant, president of Liberia
- Everett Sanders – U.S. Congressman, secretary to President Calvin Coolidge, chairman of the Republican National Committee
- John Gould Stephenson – fifth Librarian of Congress
- Richard Wigginton Thompson – U.S. Congressman and Secretary of the Navy under President Rutherford B. Hayes
- Ralph Tucker – five-term mayor of Terre Haute
- John Palmer Usher – Indiana Attorney General, Secretary of Interior under President Abraham Lincoln
- Daniel Wolsey Voorhees – U.S. Congressman, U.S. Senator
- Fred Wampler – U.S. Congressman
- James Whitcomb – Commissioner of U.S. Land Office, governor of Indiana, U.S. Senator

== Scientists and engineers ==
- Willis Blatchley – scientist, naturalist
- H. R. Cox (Herald Rea Cox) – bacteriologist
- Ernest R. Davidson – chemist, educator, National Medal of Science recipient
- David Deming – scientist, author, professor at the University of Oklahoma
- Lee Alvin DuBridge – educator, physicist, college administrator
- Barton Warren Evermann – biologist
- Thomas Lomar Gray – educator, engineer, college administrator
- Sam Hulbert – educator, scientist, inventor
- James Arthur Lovell, Jr. – astronaut
- William R. McKeen, Jr. – engineer, inventor of the McKeen railmotor and McKeen Car; founder of the McKeen Motor Car Company
- Thomas Corwin Mendenhall – physicist
- William A. Noyes – chemist, educator, recipient of Priestley Medal and Gibbs Medal
- John Adelbert Parkhurst – astronomer
- William Wesley Peters – architect, structural engineer
- Abe Silverstein – engineer, space aerodynamicist
- Jill Bolte Taylor – "The Singing Scientist," neuroanatomist, author
- Edward Tryon – astrophysicist, cosmologist
- Robert Tryon – engineering fatigue analyst

== Writers ==
- Lyman Abbott – minister, magazine publisher and editor
- Claude Bowers – journalist, author, diplomat
- Troy Brownfield – journalist, comic book writer, author, Prince Dracula
- Winnifred Harper Cooley – author, journalist
- Helen Corey – Syrian-American cookbook author, The Art of Syrian Cookery (1962) and Food from Biblical Lands (1989)
- George W. Cutter – The Song of Steam, Buena Vista
- Theodore Dreiser – An American Tragedy
- Max Ehrmann – A Prayer, Desiderata
- Philip Jose Farmer – science fiction author
- Robert Greenleaf – author
- Ida Husted Harper – suffragist, newspaper editor, History of Woman Suffrage, The Life and Work of Susan B. Anthony
- John Jakes – Kent Family Chronicles
- Howard Andrew Jones - American speculative fiction and fantasy author and editor
- William Harrison Mace – educator, historian, author, Lincoln, The Man of the People
- Edward J. Meeman – journalist and environmentalist
- Terry Pettus – journalist
- Susie Lankford Shorter – wrote Heroines of African Methodism (1891)
- Virginia Sorensen – winner of 1957 Newbery Medal
- William Strunk, Jr. – educator, author, "The Elements of Style"
- Martina Swafford — poet
- Agness Underwood – first female city editor of a metropolitan daily
- Will Weng – author, crossword puzzles editor New York Times

== Others ==
- Saint Mother Theodore Guerin – educator, religious leader
- Eva Mozes Kor – Holocaust survivor, founder of CANDLES Holocaust Museum
- Robert Hayes Gore – newspaper executive, author, former Governor of Puerto Rico
- Matt Branam – late college president of Rose-Hulman Institute of Technology
- Ellen Church Marshall – first airline stewardess
- Horace G. Burt – president, Union Pacific Railroad
- Ray S. Cline – CIA, author
- Lotus Coffman – educator, college administrator
- W.C. Coup – circus magnate
- Hubert L. Dreyfus – philosopher, educator, author
- Stuart Dreyfus – educator, author
- Mari Hulman George – philanthropist
- Tony George – business executive, former president of the Indianapolis Motor Speedway
- Robert K. Greenleaf – business executive, author, educator
- William King Harvey – CIA, "America's James Bond"
- Anton Tony Hulman – industrialist, philanthropist; Indianapolis Motor Speedway
- Mary Fendrich Hulman – business executive, philanthropist
- Robert Hunter – social reformer, author, golf course architect
- Martin David Jenkins – educator, late college president of Morgan State University
- Robert Jerry – dean, University of Florida Levin College of Law
- William G. Kerckhoff – business executive, developer of Beverly Hills, California
- Abraham Markle – miller, Canadian legislator, soldier, village proprietor
- Edison E. Oberholtzer – educator, founder of the University of Houston
- Frank Popoff – business executive, current president of Dow Chemical and Chemical Financial Corp.
- Wanda Ramey – pioneer broadcast journalist
- Orville Redenbacher – popcorn entrepreneur; born in Brazil, Indiana; Vigo County farm agent
- Peter Riedel – pilot, gliding champion
- Chauncey Rose – railroad baron, philanthropist
- Lou Anna Simon – current college president Michigan State University
- William Truesdale – railroad executive
- Clarence Abiathar Waldo – educator, author
- Leroy A. Wilson – business executive, former president of AT&T
- William Winter – explorer, author
- Trevor Perkins - Entrepreneurs
