= Stephanie Burns =

American organosilicon chemist and businesswoman

Stephanie A. Burns
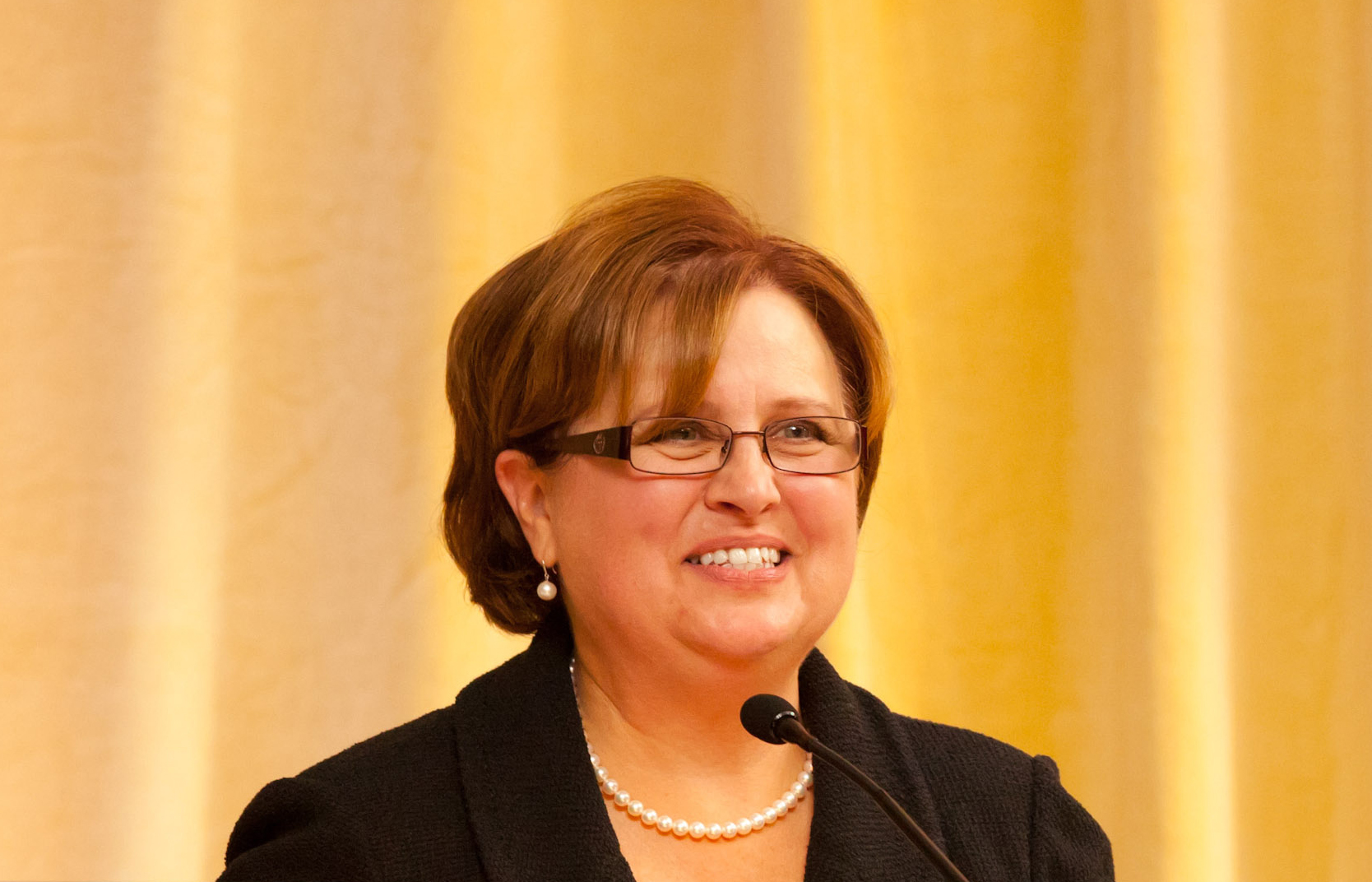
- Born: January 24, 1955 (age 71); Torrington, Wyoming, U.S.
- Education: Florida International University, Iowa State University
- Awards: International Palladium Medal (2011)
- Scientific career
- Fields: Organosilicon chemistry
- Workplaces: Dow Corning

Stephanie A. Burns (born January 24, 1955) is an American organosilicon chemist and businesswoman, who served as president and CEO of Dow Corning from 2003 to 2011. She has also served as honorary president of Society of Chemical Industry.

== Early life and education ==
Burns, the daughter of an English and history professor father who was the dean of continuing education at Florida International University in Miami, and a real estate agent mother, was born in Torrington, Wyoming. As a child, Burns was fascinated by the world around her. Burns's father constantly found her trying to dissect frogs and snakes. He supposedly instilled in her the importance of education and challenging herself. In Junior High Burns gained interest in her science and math classes leading her to declare her major in chemistry on her very first day of college.

While attending Florida International University Burns's organic chemistry professor, Arthur Herriott, first excited her about organosilicon chemistry. Burns graduated with a bachelor's degree from Florida International University in Miami in 1977. For graduate work, Herriott directed Burns to Thomas J. Barton, a specialist in organosilicon chemistry at Iowa State University, where Burns would earn her Ph.D. in organic chemistry in 1982. During Burns time at Iowa State is when she was acquainted with Dow Corning, who had funded some of her research. After graduating from Iowa State University, Burns conducted her postdoctoral studies at University of Montpellier in France. which she then followed up by joining Dow Corning to continue her research.

== Career ==
Burns joined Dow Corning in 1982 in France as a researcher and specialist in organosilicon chemistry, which is the study into compounds made of carbon and silicon. Burns's research in silicones, and new heat-resistant rubber creation has earned her three patents that she was credited in her first years at the company. She gradually worked her way into corporate management at Dow Corning, and in 1994 she was appointed director of Women's Health and was part of the Chapter 11 management team. In 1997, she moved to Brussels, after being appointed Science and Technology Director for Europe.

Upon her return to the United States in 2000, Burns was appointed executive vice president of the firm, and three years later became its president, the first woman to do so. She served as the president and chief executive officer of Dow Corning, from February 2003 until her retirement on 31 December 2011. She also served as its chief operating officer from January 2004, and as chairman from January 2006, until her retirement, replacing Gary E. Anderson. Under Burns's leadership, Dow Corning expanded their range to include more than 7,000 silicon-based products. Additionally, she has overseen extensive diversification of the company's reach extending into new geographic markets. In Burns tenure at the top of Dow Corning, she has led them to nearly quintuple their profits, and raised their annual spending on R&D to 6% of their total sails. In 2011 Burns received the International Palladium medal from the Société de Chimie Industrielle for her many distinguished contributions to the chemical industry and, contributing to the enhancement of the international aims and objectives of the Société de Chimie Industrielle. Burns is the first woman to receive this award, which was presented to her at a dinner in her honor on May 3, 2011, in the Grand Ballroom of the Roosevelt Hotel in New York.

== Service on councils and boards ==
Burns has also served as honorary president of the Society of Chemical Industry, as chairwoman of the American Chemistry Council, and on the boards of the Michigan Molecular Institute and the Society for Women's Health Research. Burns also was appointed by President Barack Obama to the President's Export Council.
