= Frank Popoff =

Bulgarian-born American businessman (1935–2024)

- Bulgarian: Франк Попов
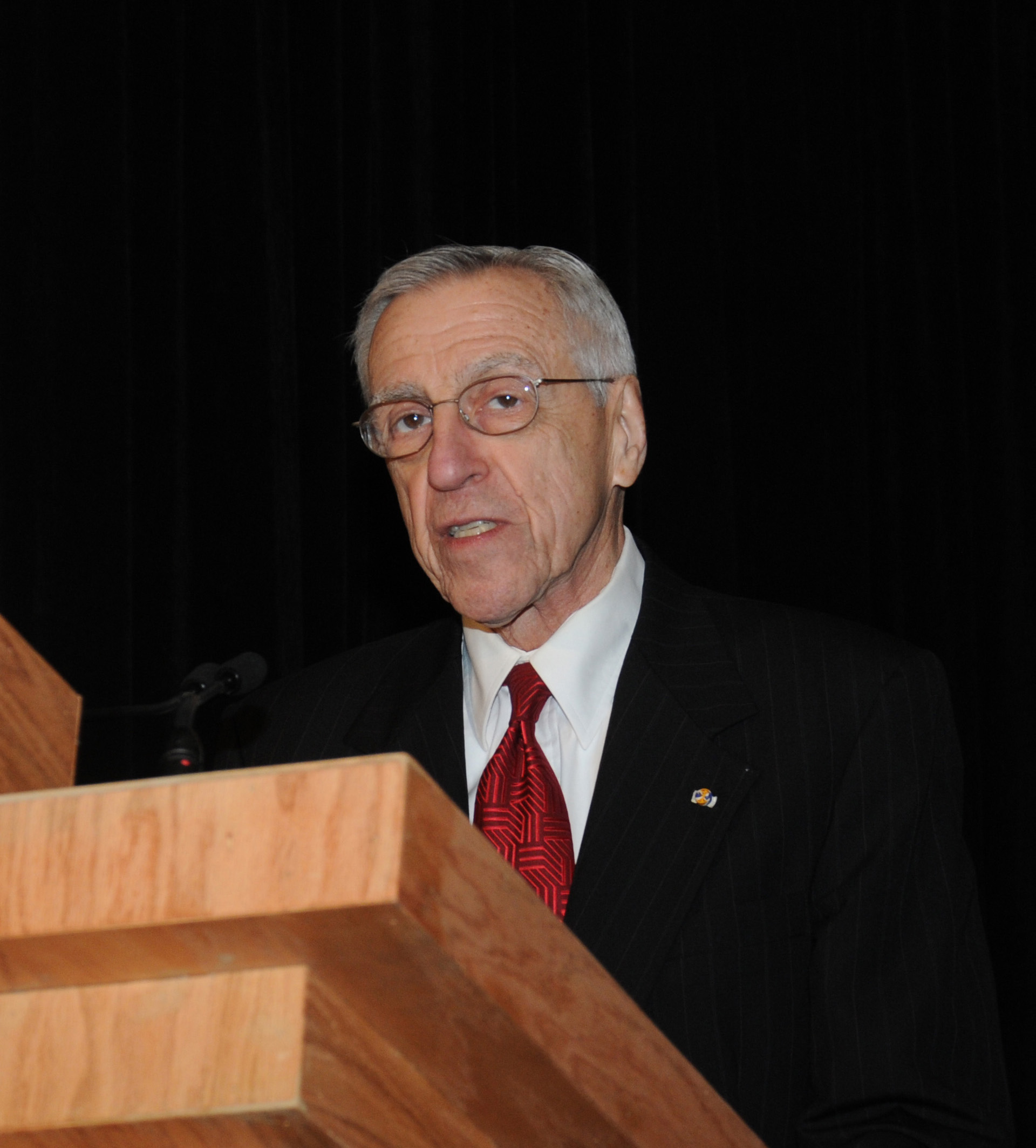
- Popoff in 2014
- Born: October 27, 1935; Sofia, Bulgaria
- Died: February 25, 2024 (aged 88); Midland, Michigan, United States
- Citizenship: United States
- Education: Master of Business Administration
- Alma mater: Indiana University
- Known for: CEO, Dow Chemical Corporation 1987—1995
- Spouse: Jean Urse
- Children: 3
- Awards: Petrochemical Heritage Award
- Scientific career
- Fields: Petrochemical Industry
- Institutions: Dow Chemical Company, TCF Financial Corporation

Frank Popoff or Frank Popov (Bulgarian: Франк Попов; October 27, 1935 – February 25, 2024) was a Bulgarian and American businessman. He served as the chairman of TCF Financial Corporation from April 2004.

== Biography ==
Born in Sofia, Bulgaria, on October 27, 1935, Popoff emigrated in 1941 with his father and mother, Eftim and Stoyanka Popoff and his sister Joan to Terre Haute, Indiana. He attended Terre Haute Wiley High School in Terre Haute, graduating in June 1953. He then attended college at Indiana University, graduating with an A.B. in chemistry in 1957, and an MBA from IU's Kelley School of Business in 1959. He was a member of Sigma Chi fraternity.

While in graduate school, he married Jean Urse, a graduate of the IU College of Education on August 30, 1958. They had three sons.

Popoff died in Midland on February 25, 2024, at the age of 88.

== Career ==
Popoff joined The Dow Chemical Company in 1959 and served in technical service and development, sales and marketing positions prior to becoming general manager of the Agricultural Products Department, president of Dow Chemical Europe in Zurich, Switzerland, and returning to Dow's Midland, Michigan, headquarters in 1985 to become chief executive officer and chairman of the board of directors.

Popoff was the chief executive officer of The Dow Chemical Company from December 1987 to November 1995, and chairman of the board from December 1992 to November 2000. He was a director of Chemical Financial Corporation from 1989 to 2006 and chairman from 2004 to 2006. He has served as director of American Express Co., Qwest Communications International Inc., United Technologies Corp. and Shin-Etsu Chemical Co. Ltd. and was director emeritus of the Indiana University Foundation. He was also a member of the American Chemical Society and served as a member of both the Business Roundtable and The Business Council. In his tenure as the CEO of Dow Chemical, Popoff led the push to make the company environmentally sustainable.

== Awards and honors ==
- 1988 - Indiana University, Doctor of Science (honorary).
- 1988 - Rose-Hulman Institute of Technology, Doctor of Engineering (honorary).
- 1989 - Titled Knight Commander in the Order of Orange-Nassau by the Netherlands.
- 1990 - Northwood University, Doctorate (honorary).
- 1992 - Leadership Award of the United States Council for International Business.
- 1993 - René Dubos Environmental Award.
- 1994 - International Palladium Medal of the Société de Chimie Industrielle (American Section).
- 2014 - Petrochemical Heritage Award.

== See also ==
- List of Indiana University (Bloomington) people
- List of people from Terre Haute, Indiana
