= Charles O. Holliday =

American businessman

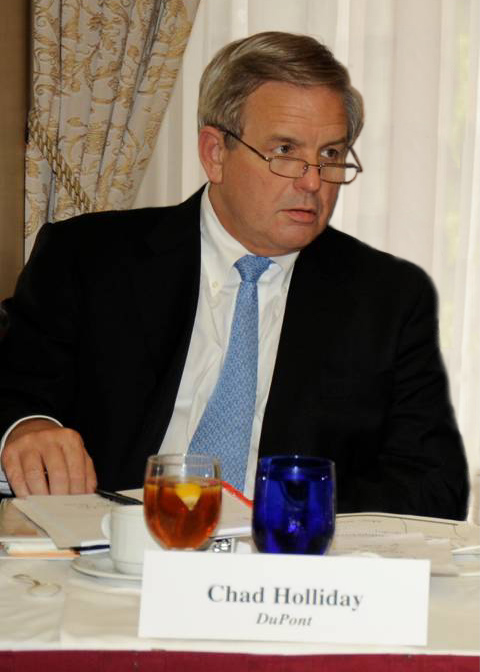
- Holliday in 2007
- Born: Charles Otis Holliday, Jr. March 9, 1948 (age 78); Nashville, Tennessee, U.S.
- Education: University of Tennessee
- Awards: International Palladium Medal

Charles Otis "Chad" Holliday, Jr. (born March 9, 1948) is an American businessman, former chairman of Royal Dutch Shell, former chairman of Bank of America, former chief executive officer and a former director of E. I. du Pont de Nemours and Company (DuPont). He is chairman emeritus of the U.S. Council on Competitiveness and chairman of the Business Roundtable's Task Force for Environment, Technology and Economy. Holliday is also a founding member of the International Business Council and serves on the board of advisors of the Nicholas Institute for Environmental Policy Solutions.

Between May 2015 and May 2021 he was chairman of Royal Dutch Shell.

== Early life ==
Holliday was born in 1948 and grew up in Nashville, Tennessee. He graduated from John Overton High, where he met his future wife, Ann. Holliday earned his B.S. in industrial engineering from the University of Tennessee in 1970. He was a member of the Pi Kappa Alpha fraternity Zeta chapter. Holliday started at DuPont in the summer of 1970 at DuPont's Old Hickory site. He then turned a summer job at DuPont into a full-time position as an engineer. He advanced through manufacturing and supervisory positions around the world until he was named CEO in 1998.

== Professional career ==
Holliday was the 18th CEO of DuPont in more than 200 years of DuPont history. Under Holliday's leadership, DuPont established a goal of achieving sustainable growth – increasing shareholder and societal value while simultaneously decreasing DuPont's environmental footprint. As a result, DuPont has shifted from being a chemical company to being a science-based products and services company. On September 23, 2008, DuPont announced that Holliday would retire as CEO on December 31, 2008, and that its board of directors had elected Ellen J. Kullman to succeed Holliday with effect from January 1, 2009. On 30 October 2009, DuPont announced that Holliday would retire as chairman with effect from December 31, 2009, and that Kullman had been appointed chairman effective from that date.

Holliday is the chairman of Council on Competitiveness and the Business Roundtable's Task Force for Environment, Technology and Economy. Holliday was previously chairman of the World Business Council for Sustainable Development (WBCSD) and chairman of the Society of Chemical Industry – American Section. He was chairman of The Business Council in 2003 and 2004. He is a founding member of the International Business Council and is on the board of advisors of the Nicholas Institute for Environmental Policy Solutions.

On September 21, 2009, Holliday was elected to the board of directors of Bank of America, and was elected chairman on April 28, 2010. Holliday received an honorary doctorate from Polytechnic University, and is a licensed professional engineer.

Holliday was elected a member of the National Academy of Engineering in 2004.

=== Compensation ===
While CEO of DuPont in 2008, Holliday earned total compensation of $10,213,441, which included a base salary of $1,369,500, a cash bonus of $1,732,000, stocks granted of $4,796,309, and options granted of $2,166,672.

== Publications ==
Holliday has co-written a book titled Walking the Talk, which details the business case for sustainable development and corporate responsibility.
