= Othmer Gold Medal =

Science award

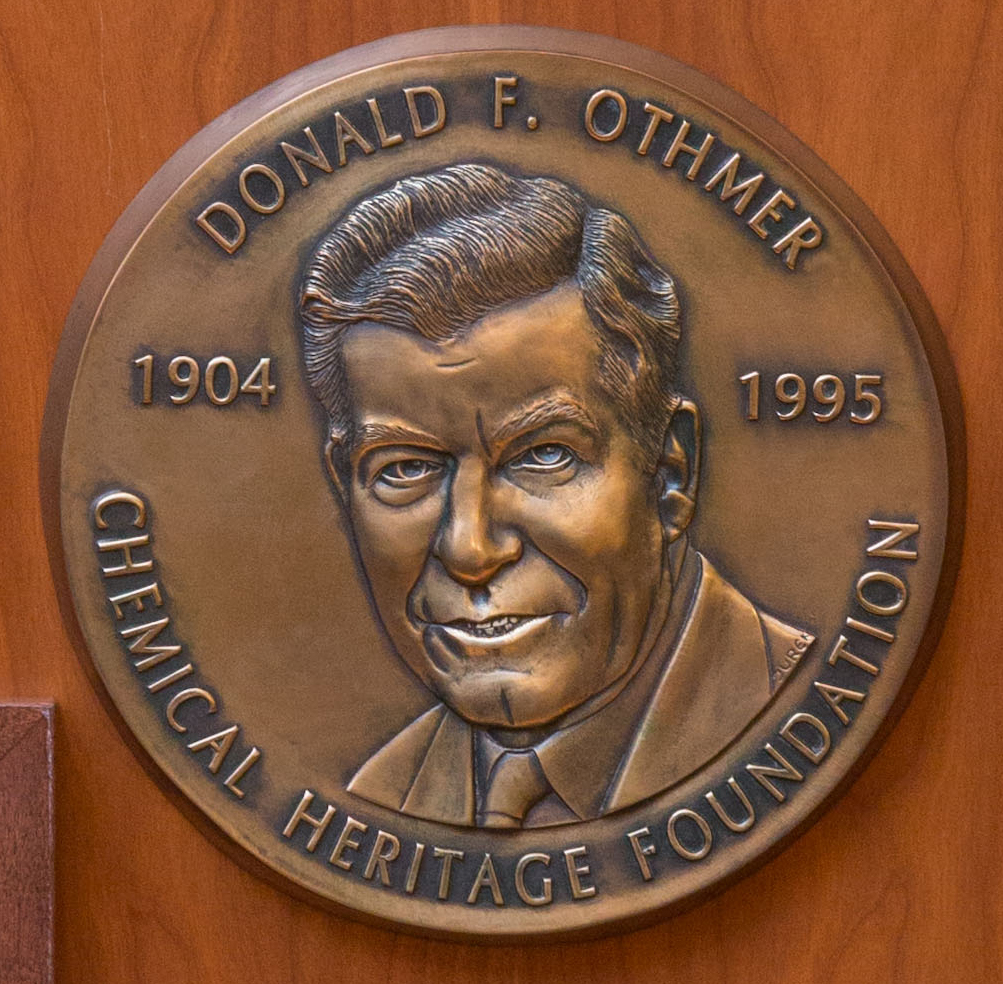
- First Othmer Gold Medal, awarded 1997
- Awarded for: Contributions to chemical and scientific heritage through innovation, entrepreneurship, research, education, public understanding, legislation, or philanthropy.
- Date: 1997
- Presented by: Science History Institute, American Chemical Society (ACS), American Institute of Chemical Engineers (AIChE), The Chemists' Club, Société de Chimie Industrielle (American Section)

The Othmer Gold Medal recognizes outstanding individuals who contributed to progress in chemistry and science through their activities in areas including innovation, entrepreneurship, research, education, public understanding, legislation, and philanthropy. The medal is presented annually under the sponsorship of the Science History Institute (formerly the Chemical Heritage Foundation) and four affiliated organizations: the American Chemical Society (ACS), the American Institute of Chemical Engineers (AIChE), The Chemists' Club, and the American section of the Société de Chimie Industrielle, at the Science History Institute's Heritage Day.

The Othmer Medal commemorates chemist Donald Othmer (1904–1995), a researcher, engineer, inventor, philanthropist, professor, and co-editor of the Kirk-Othmer Encyclopedia of Chemical Technology. Each year, the recipient of the award designates an institution to receive a copy of the 26 volume Kirk-Othmer Encyclopedia of Chemical Technology from John Wiley & Sons, Inc.

== Recipients ==
The award is given yearly and was first presented in 1997.

- Dame Carol V. Robinson, 2020
- Sangeeta N. Bhatia, 2019
- Joshua Boger, 2018
- Richard Zare, 2017
- Mukesh Ambani, 2016
- Phillip Allen Sharp, 2015
- Kiran Mazumdar-Shaw, 2014
- Harry B. Gray, 2013
- Marye Anne Fox, 2012
- Kazuo Inamori, 2011
- George M. Whitesides, 2010
- Ahmed Zewail, 2009
- Yuan Tseh Lee, 2008
- Thomas R. Cech, 2007
- Ronald Breslow, 2006
- James D. Watson, 2005
- Jon Huntsman, Sr., 2004
- John D. Baldeschwieler and George S. Hammond, 2003
- Robert S. Langer, 2002
- Gordon E. Moore, 2001
- Arnold O. Beckman, 2000 (In addition to the regular award for 2000, a Special Millennium Edition was given out.)
- Carl Djerassi, 2000
- P. Roy Vagelos, 1999
- Mary Lowe Good, 1998
- Ralph Landau, 1997

=== Photo Gallery ===
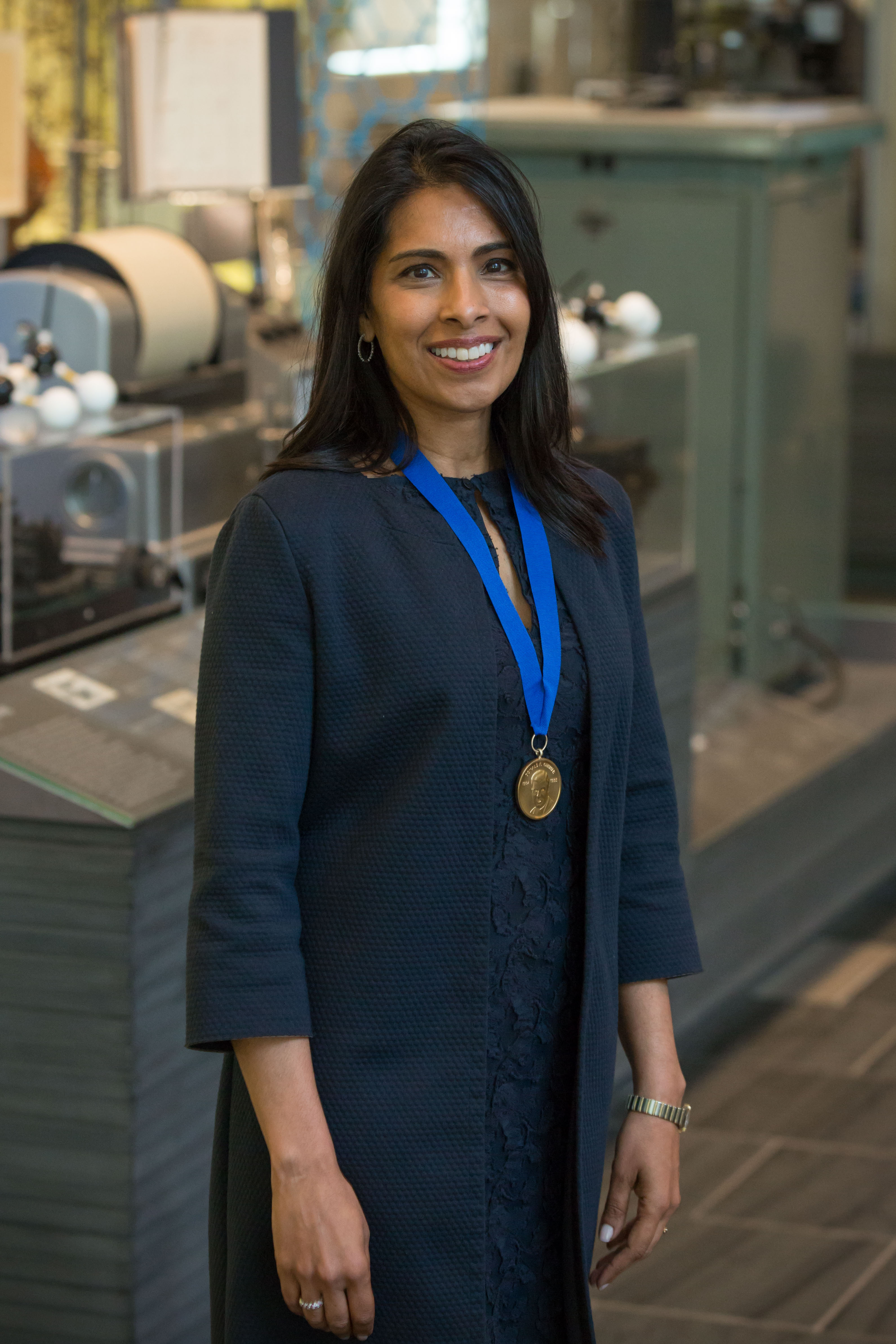
Sangeeta N. Bhatia (2019)

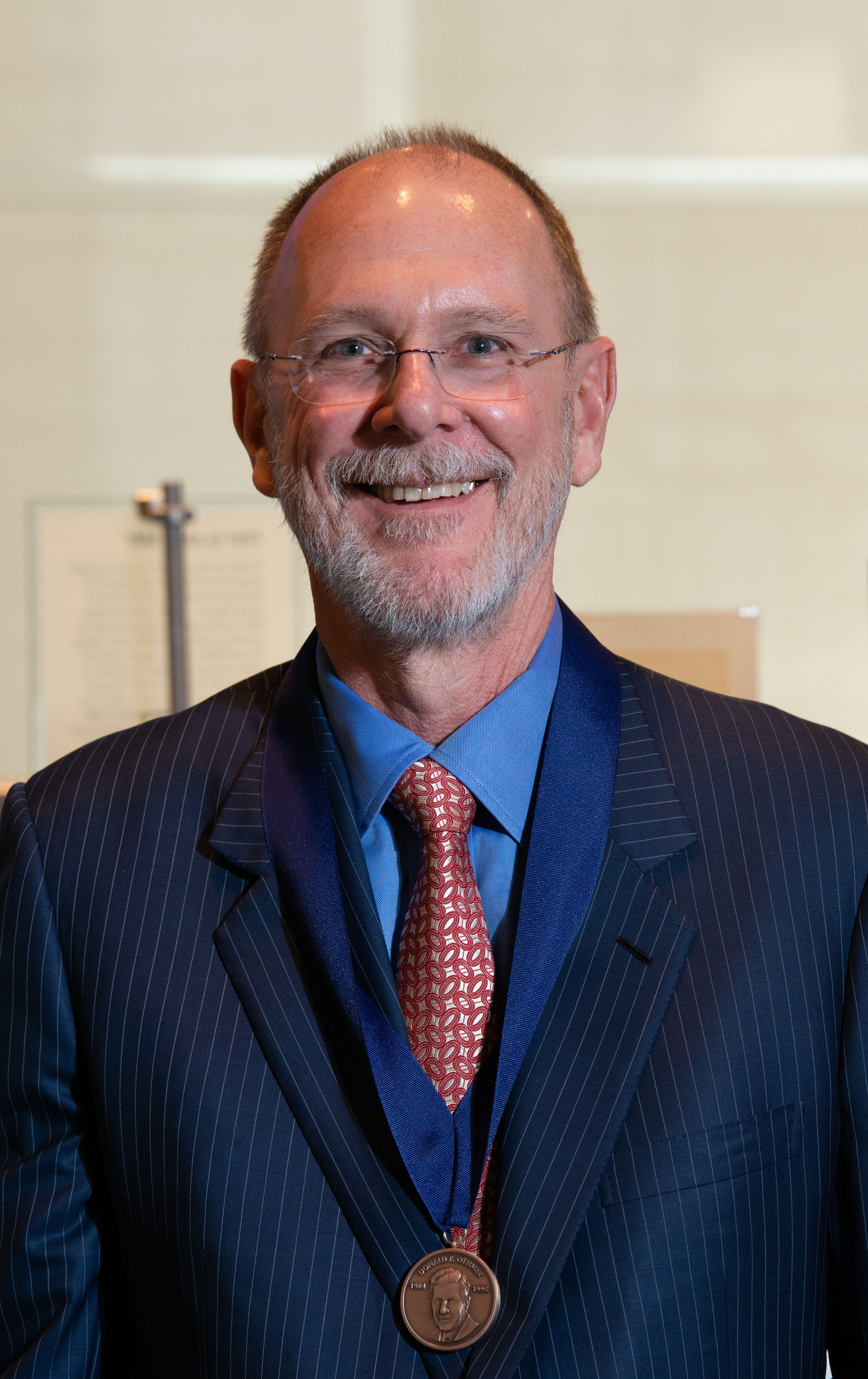
Joshua Boger (2018)

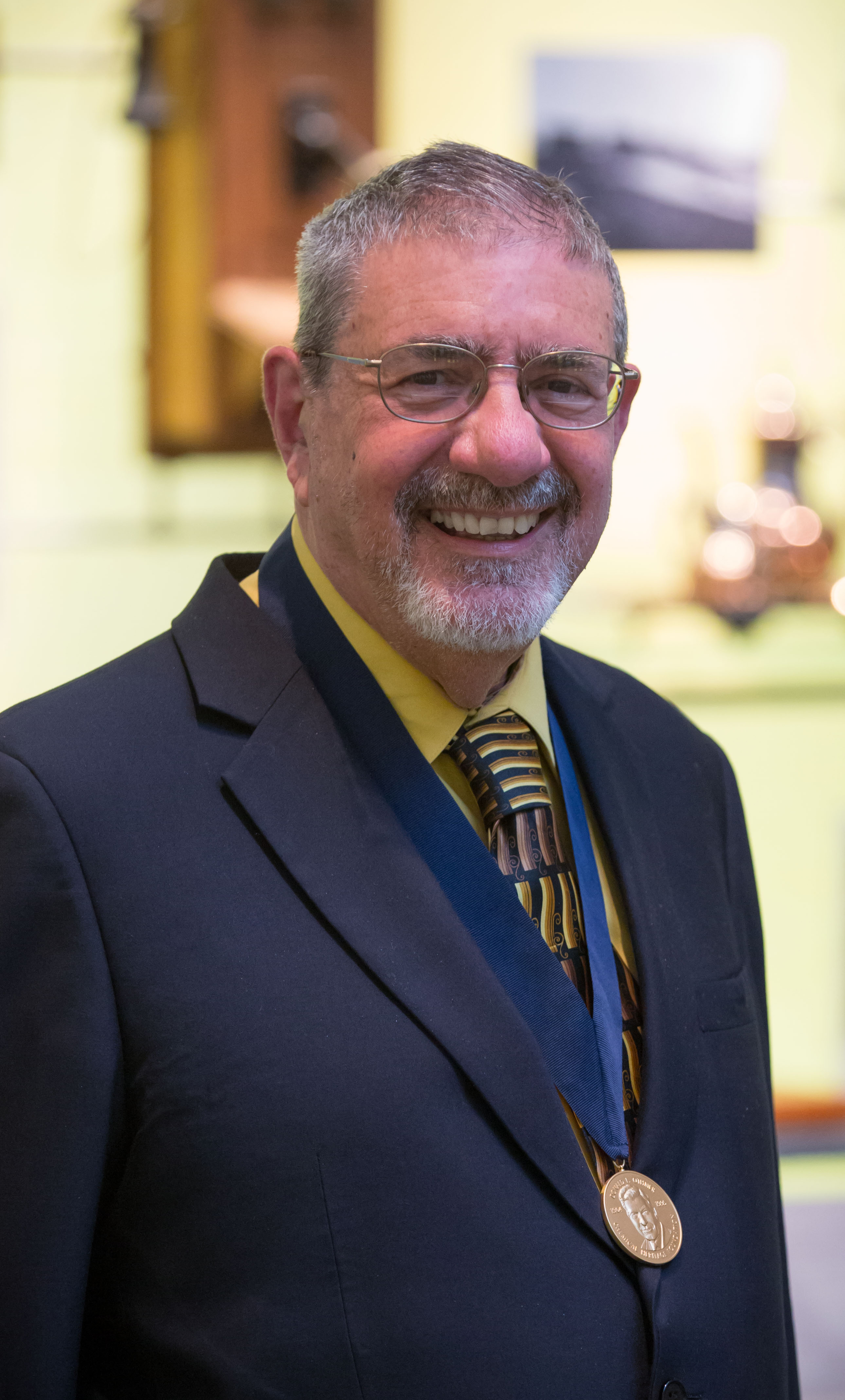
Richard Zare (2017)

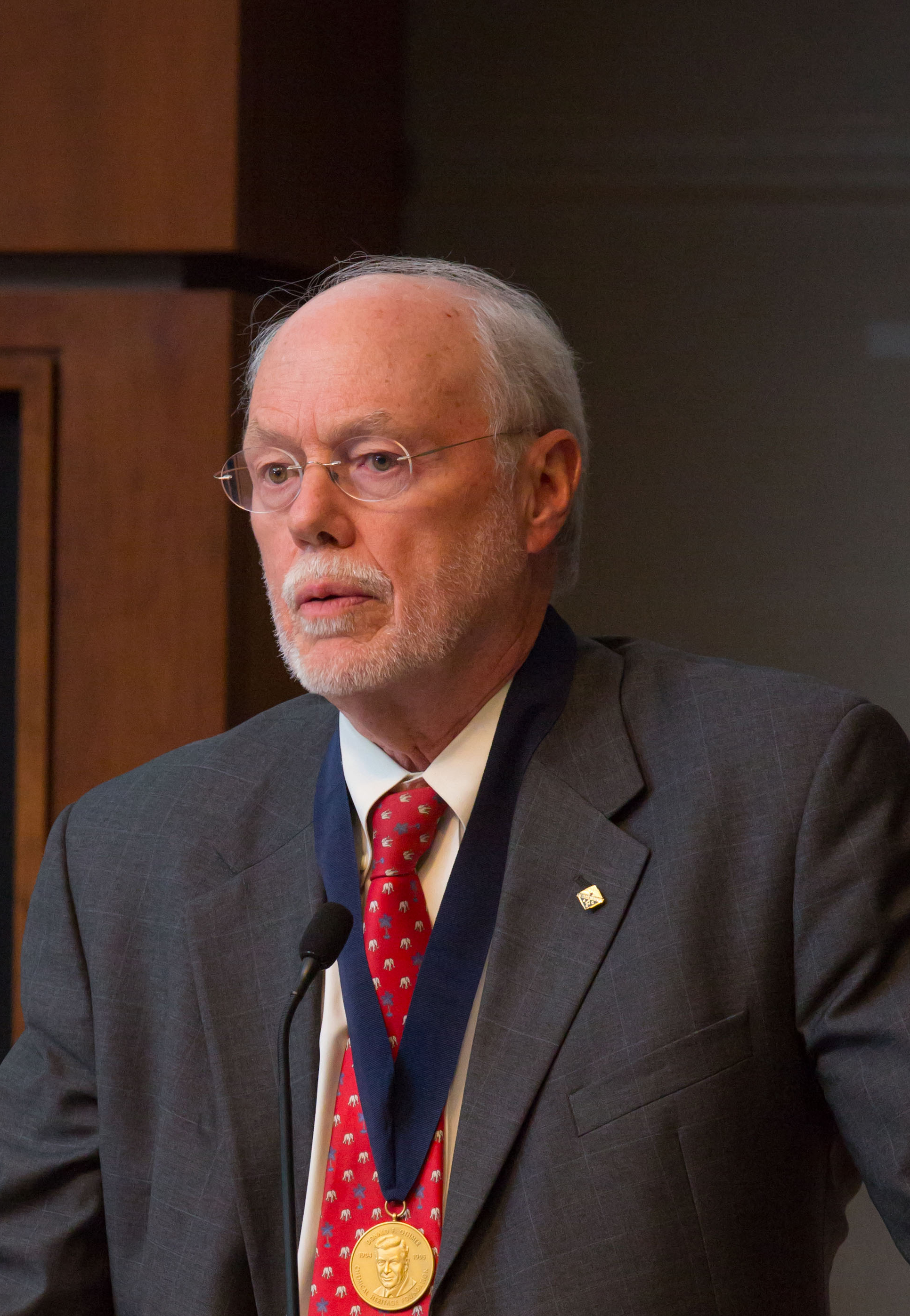
Phillip Allen Sharp (2015)

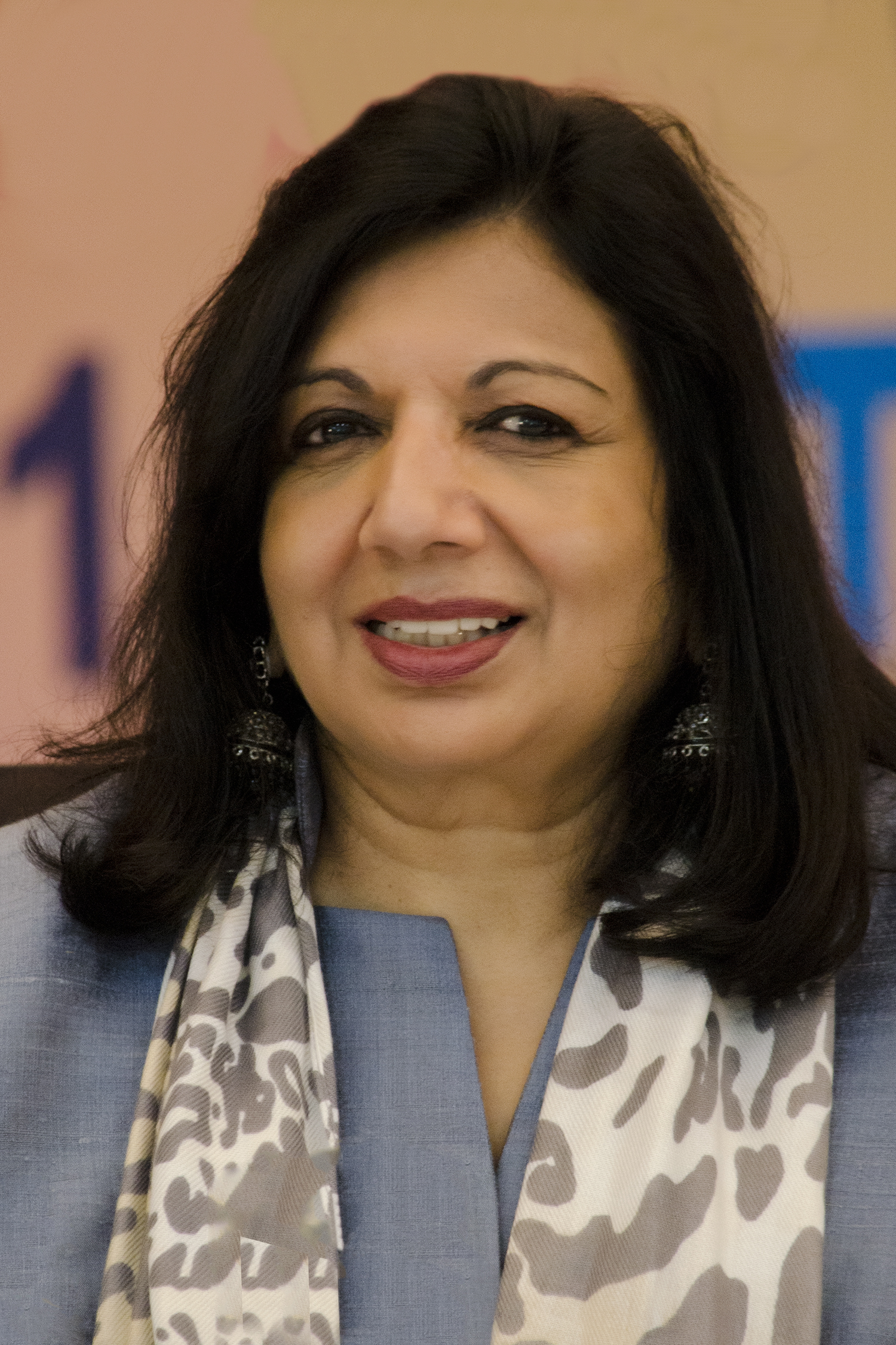
Kiran Mazumdar-Shaw (2014)

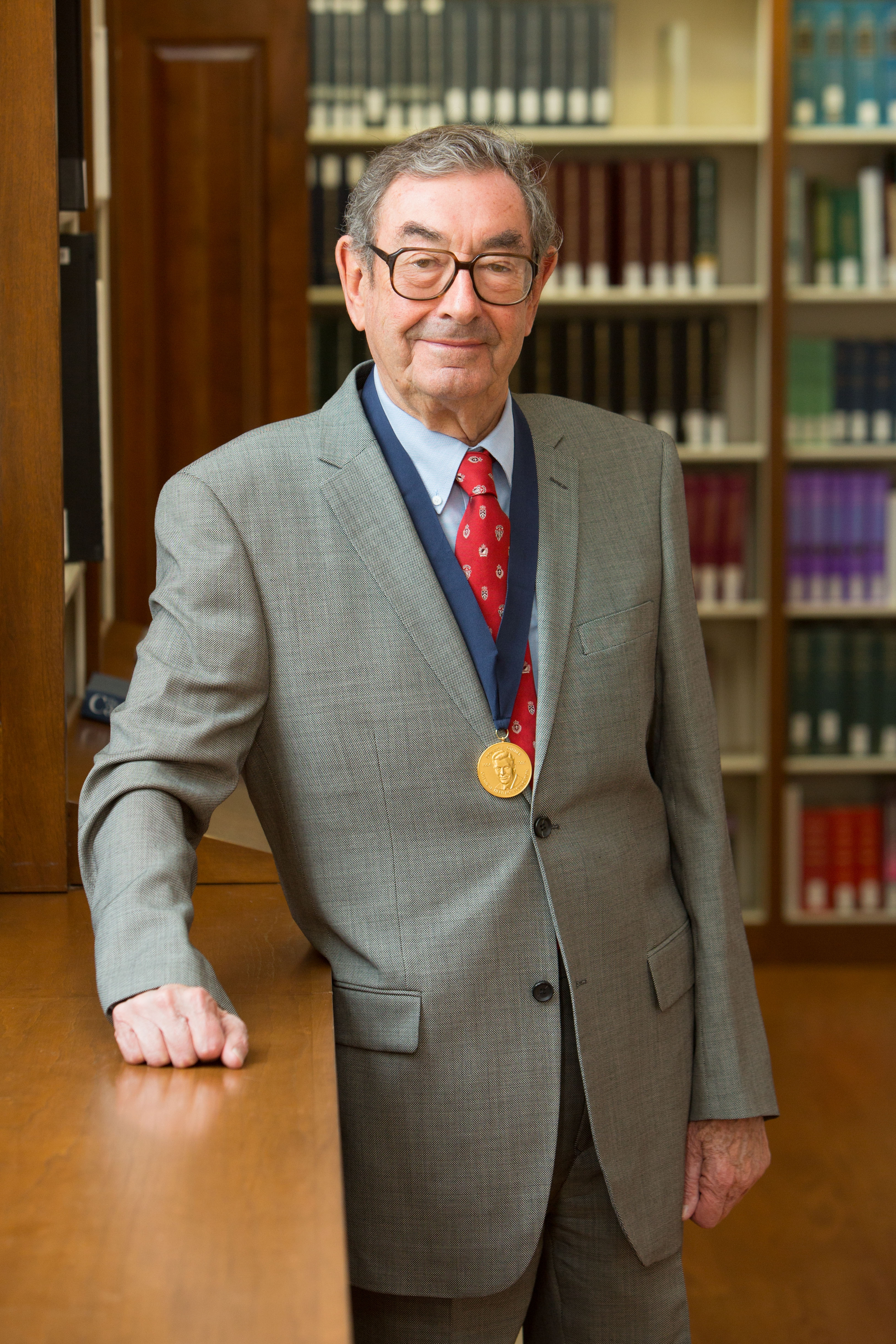
Harry Gray (2013)

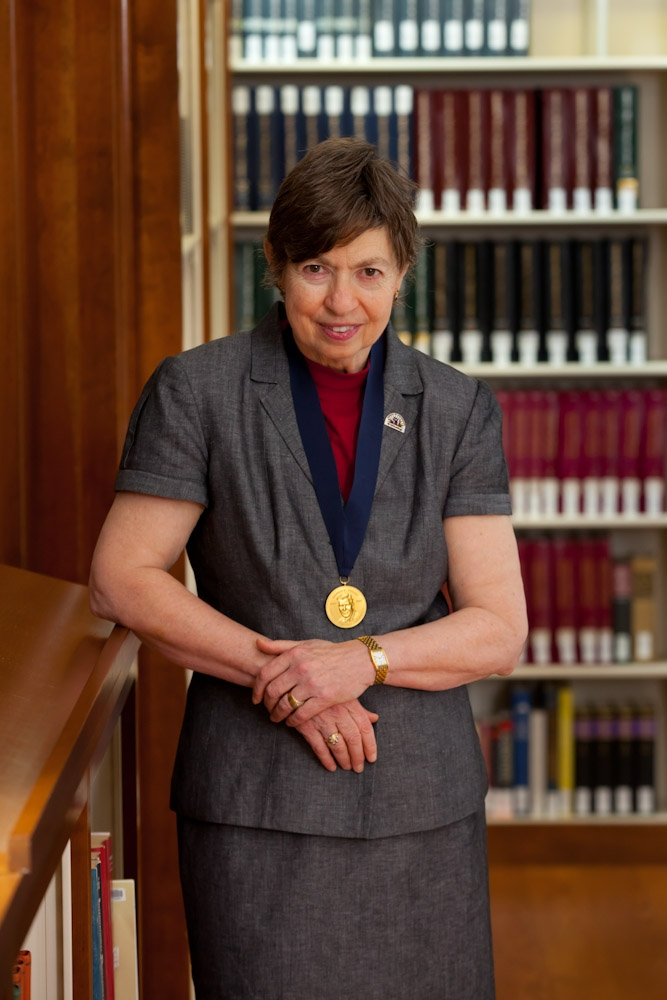
Marye Anne Fox (2012)

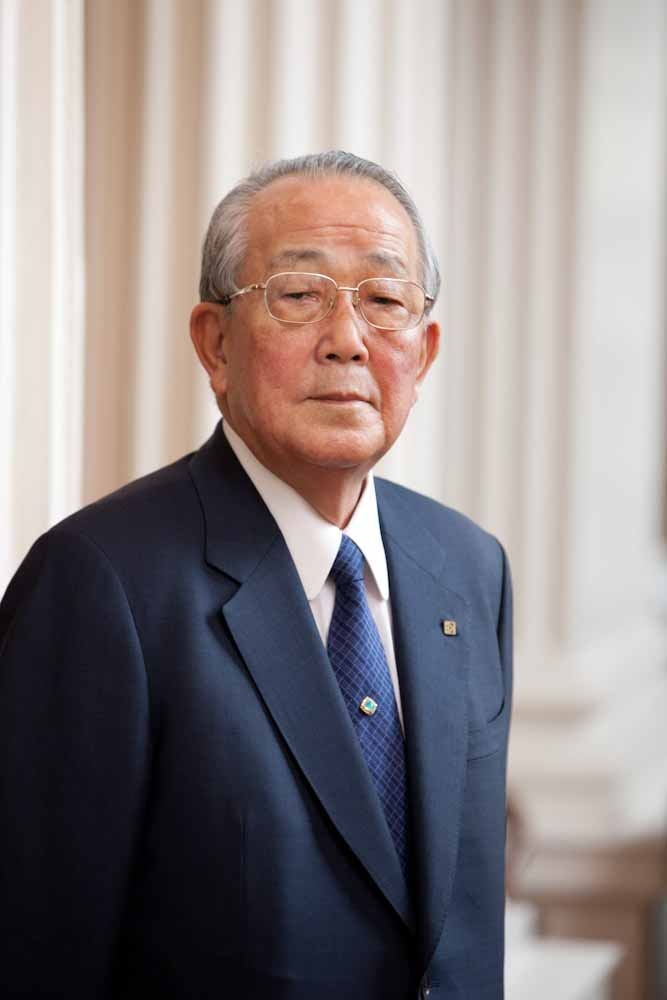
Kazuo Inamori (2011)

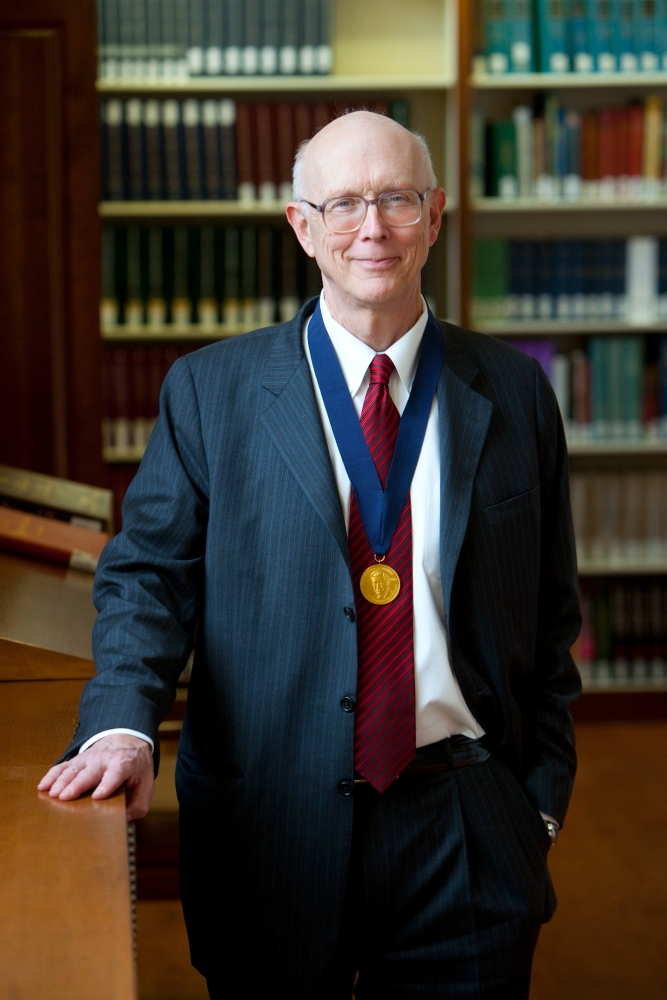
George Whitesides (2010)

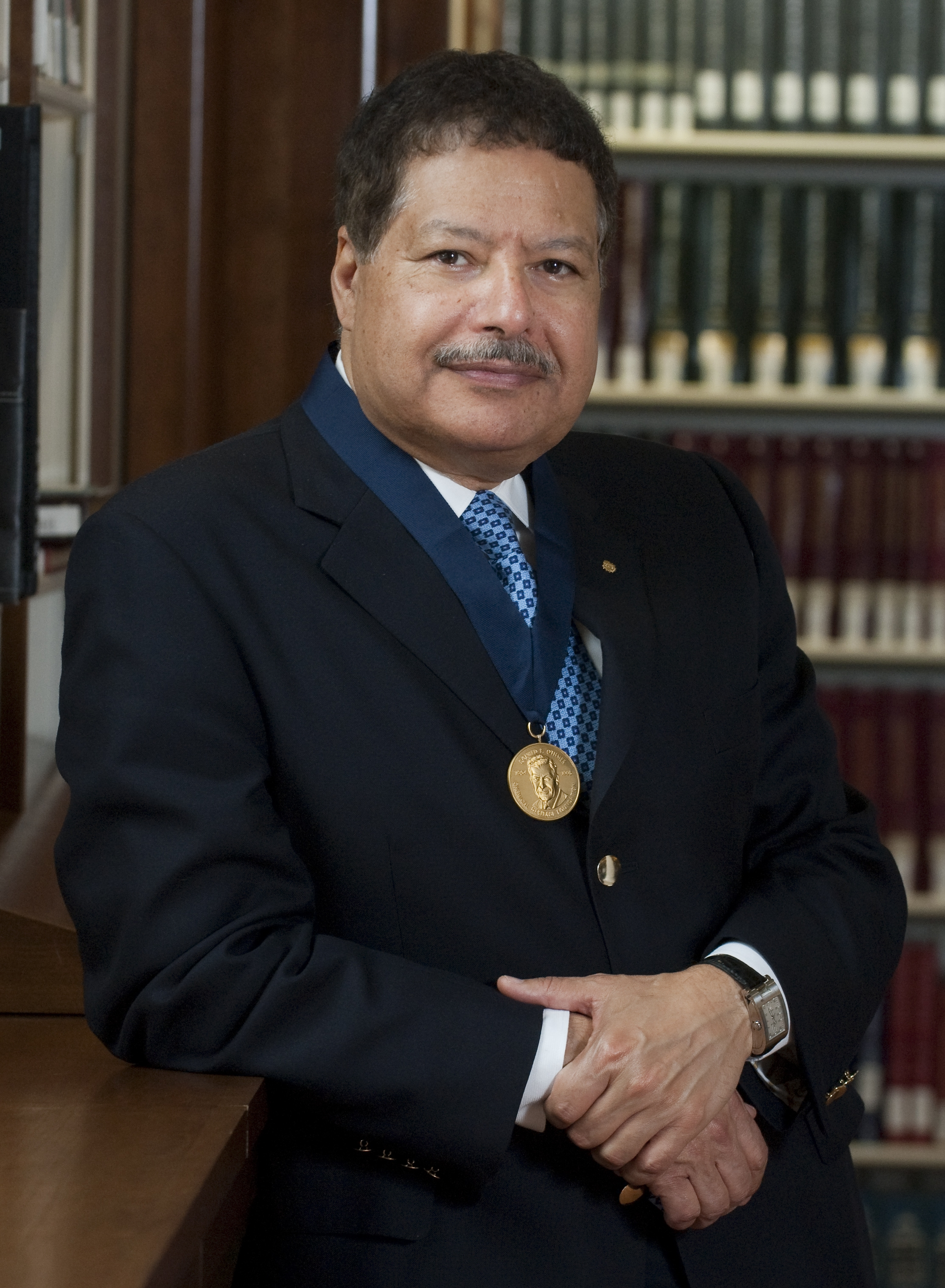
Ahmed Zewail (2009)

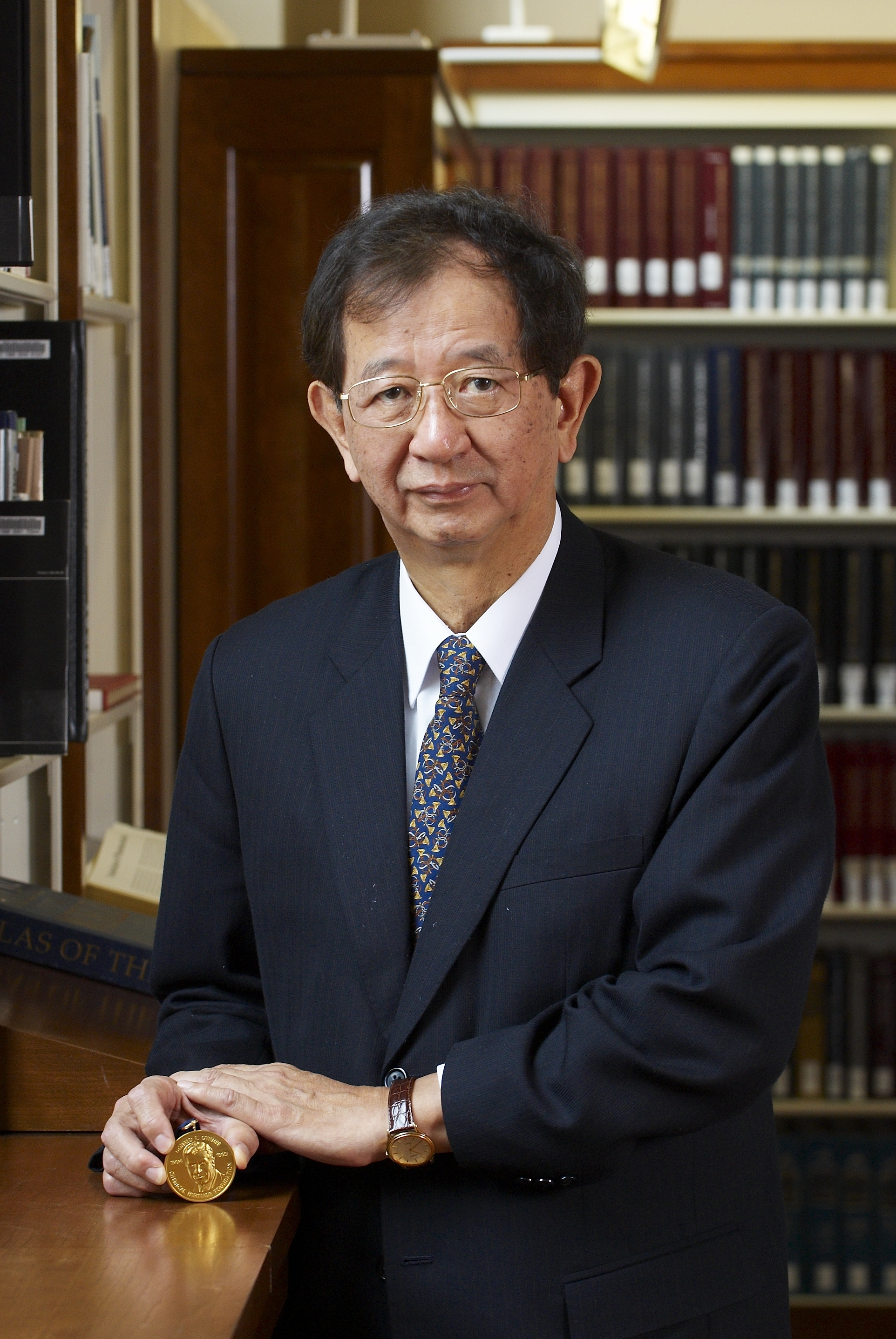
Yuan Tseh Lee (2008)

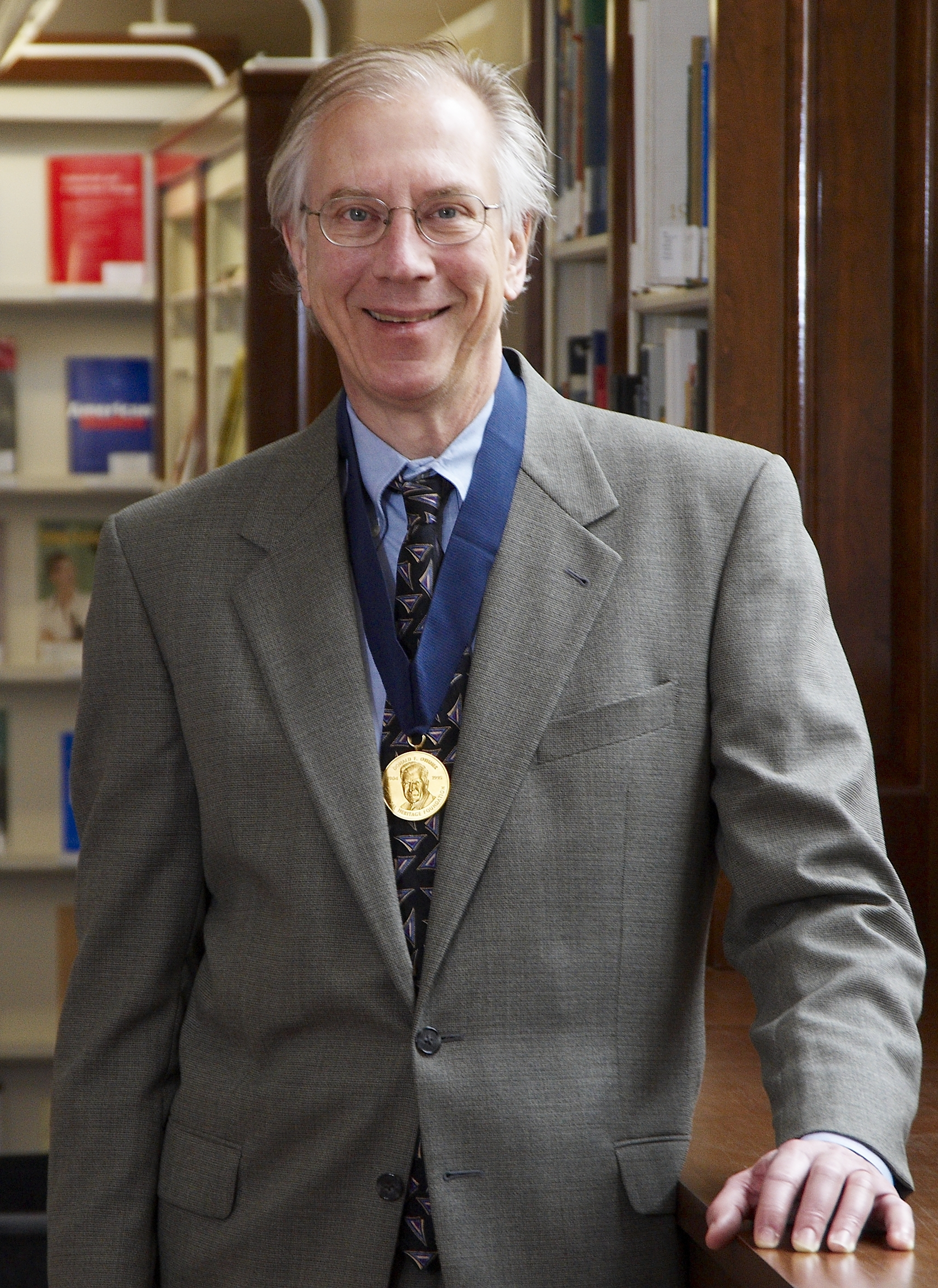
Thomas Cech (2007)

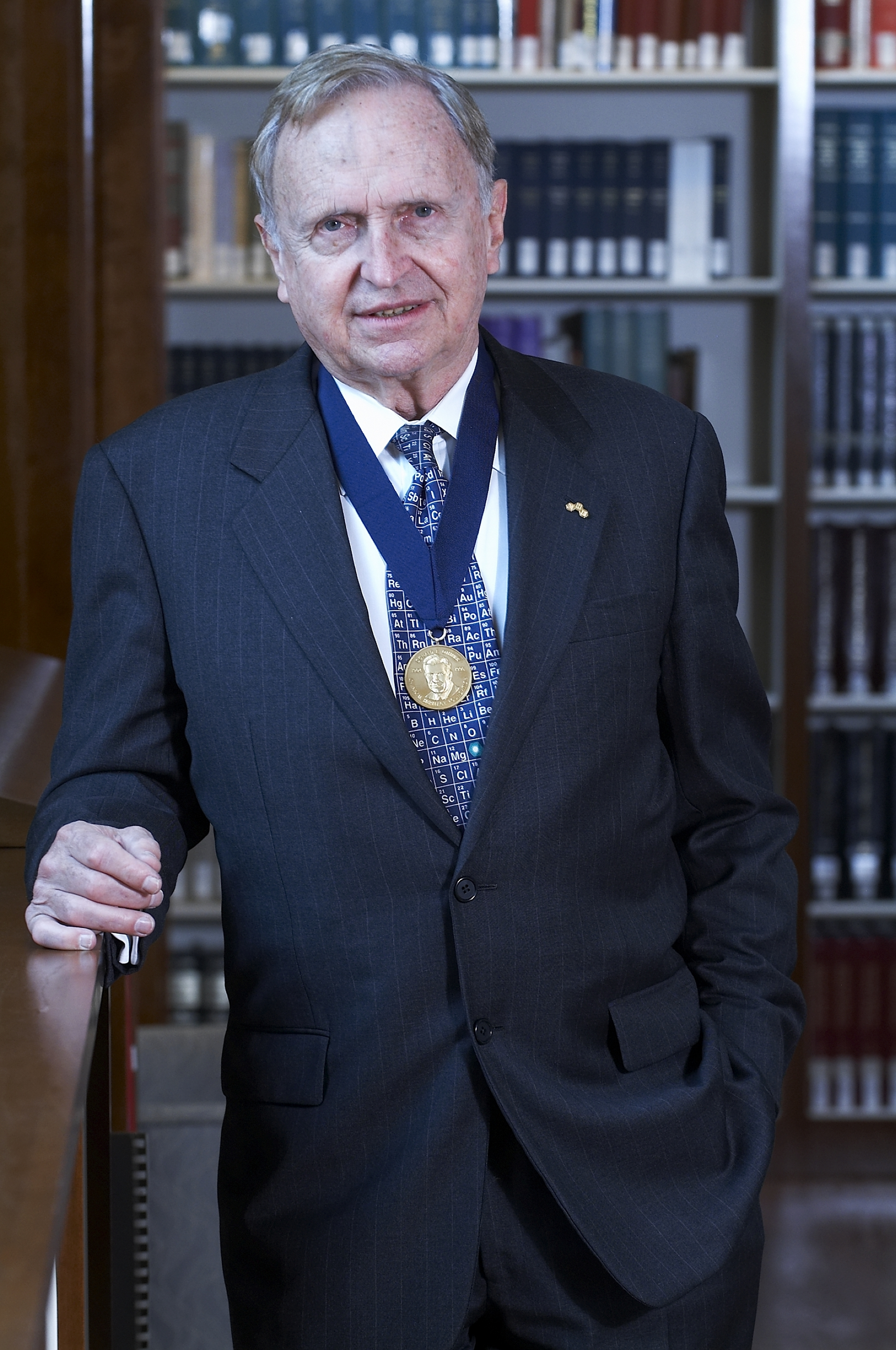
Ronald Breslow (2006)

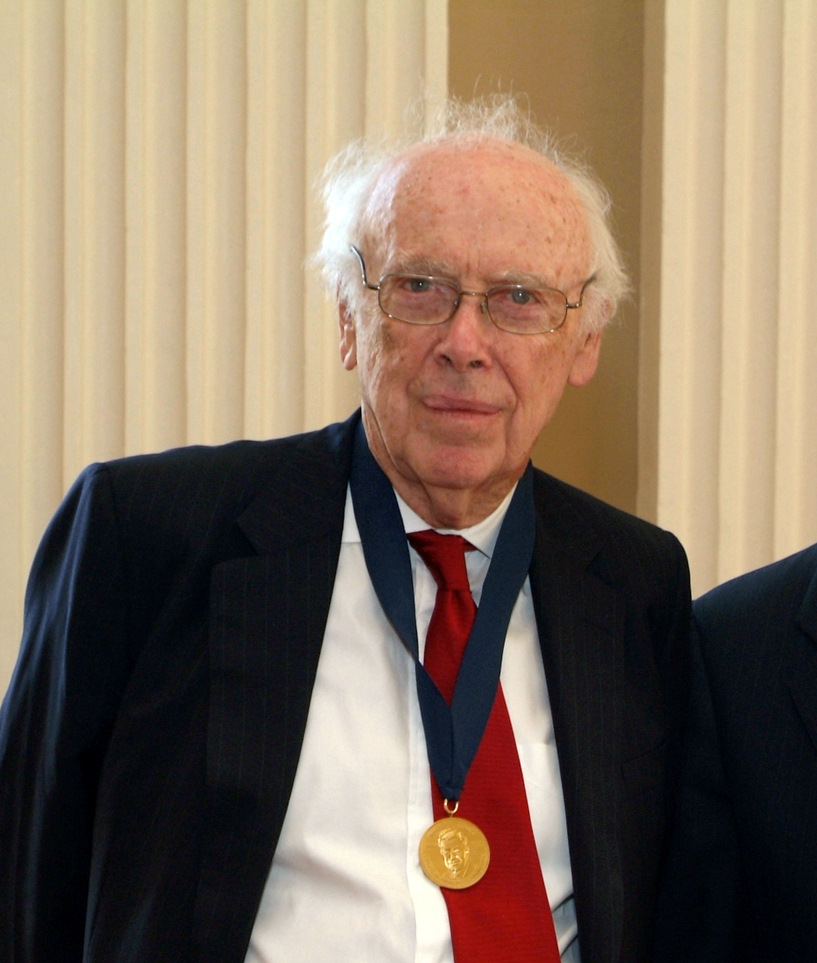
James D. Watson (2005)

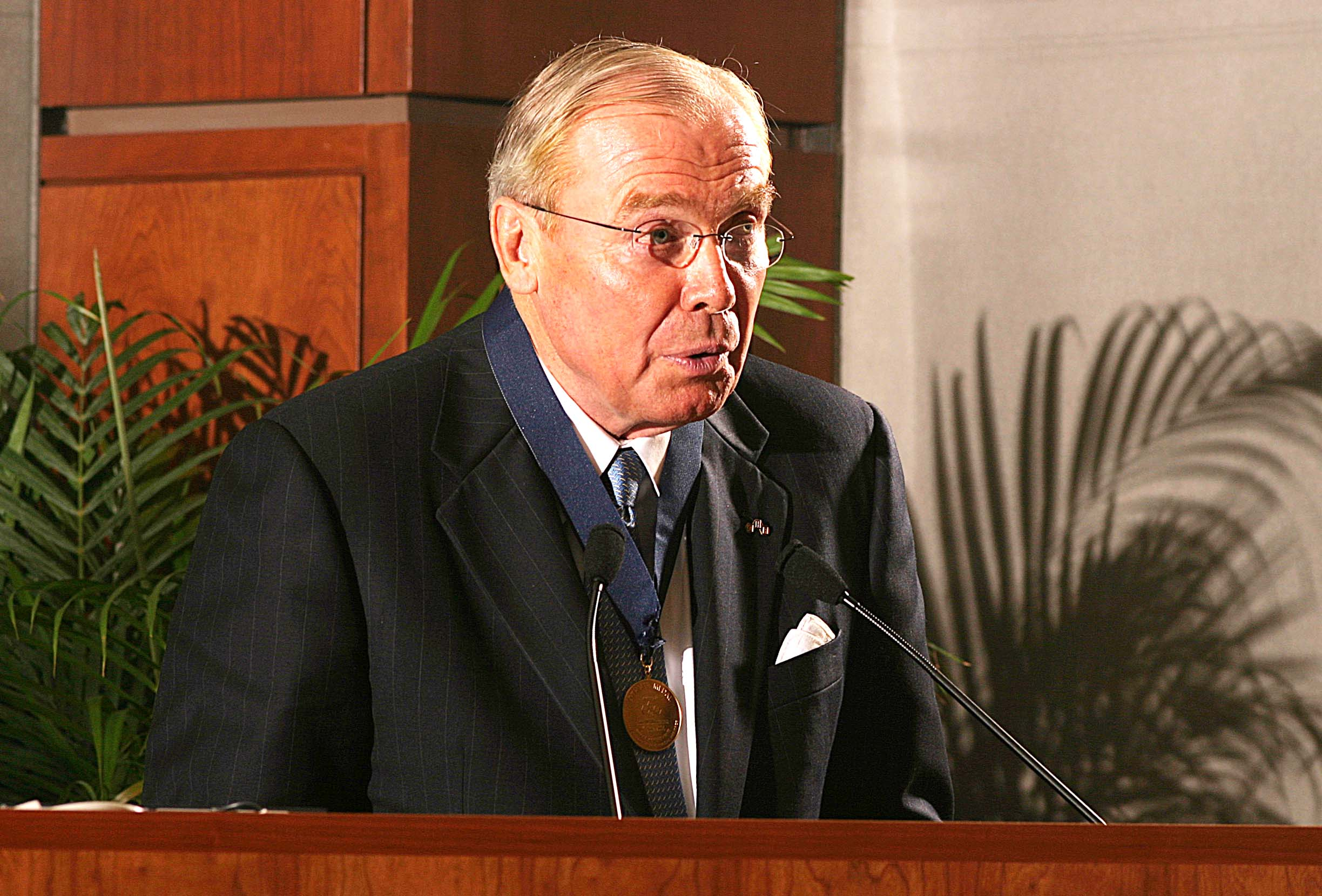
Jon Huntsman, Sr. (2004)

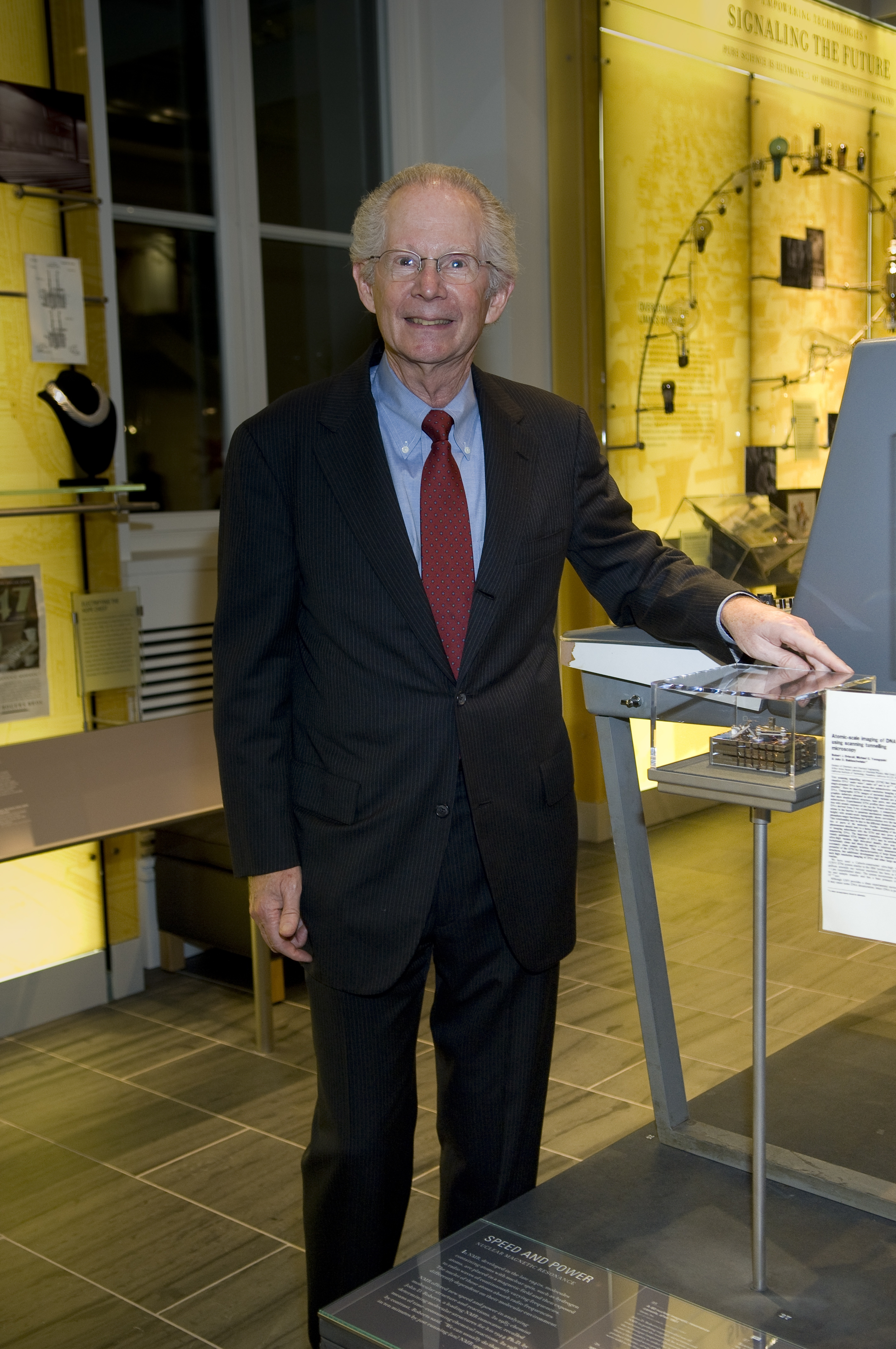
John D. Baldeschwieler (2003;
photo from 2008)

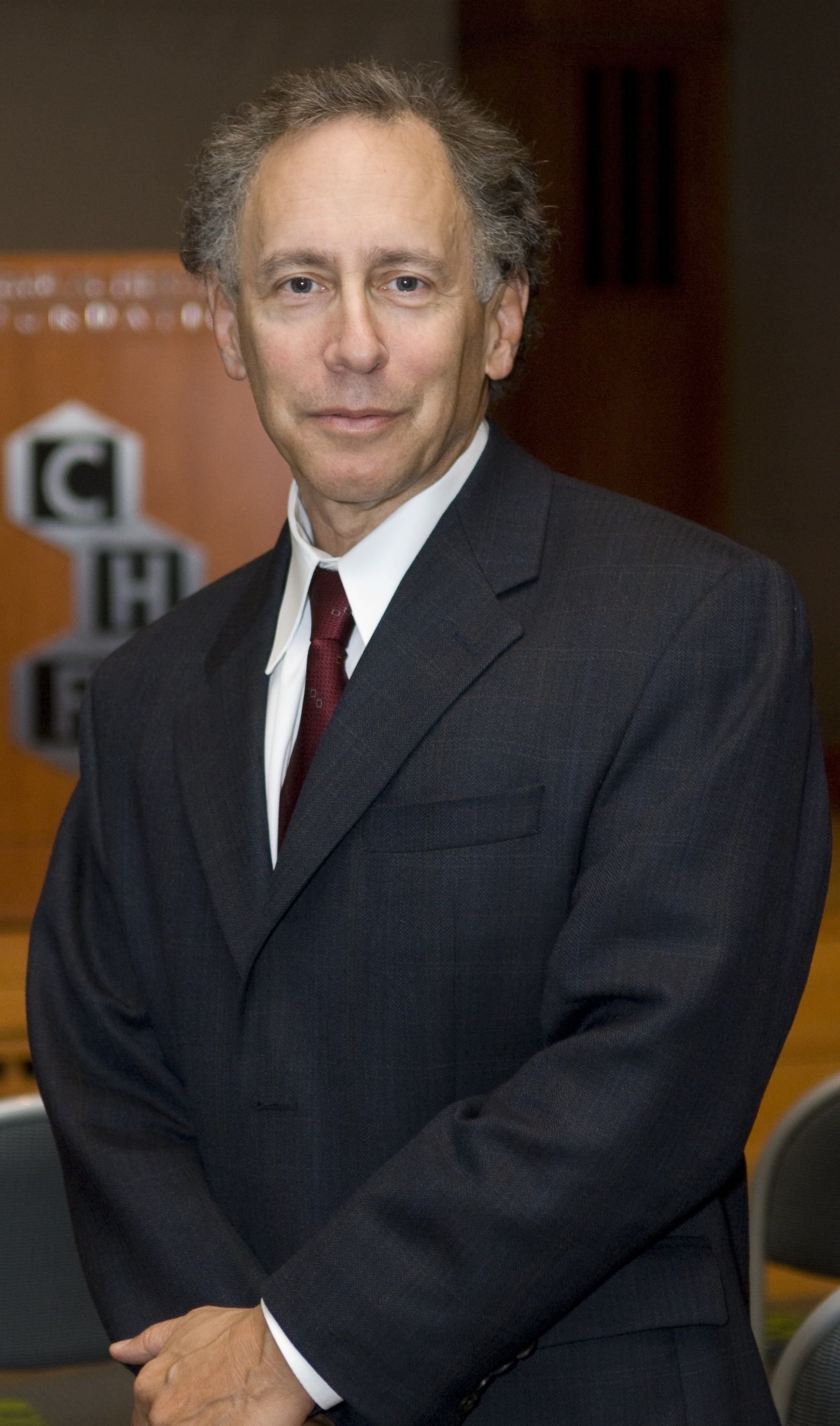
Robert Langer (2002;
photo from 2008)

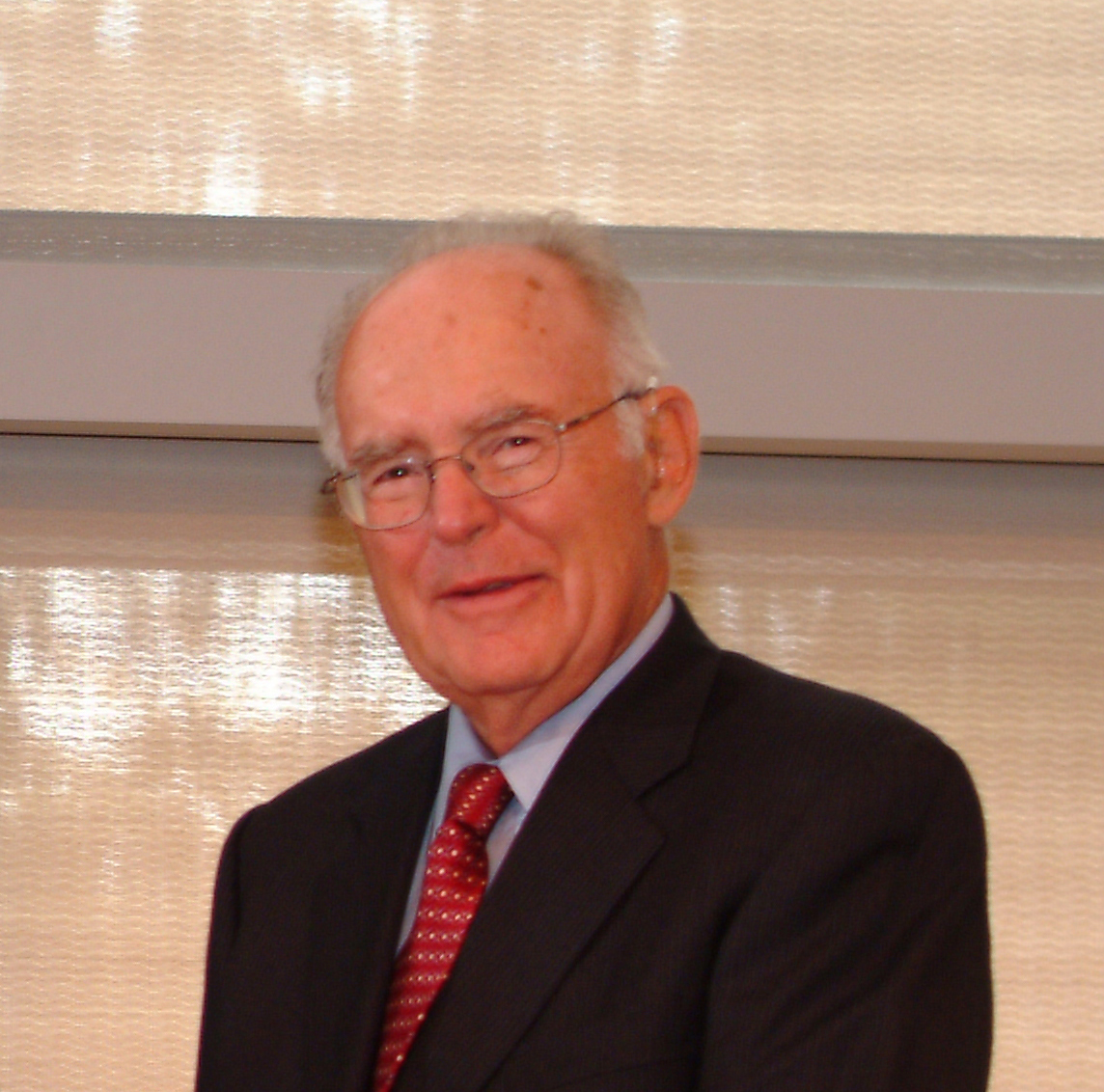
Gordon Moore (2001;
photo from 2004)

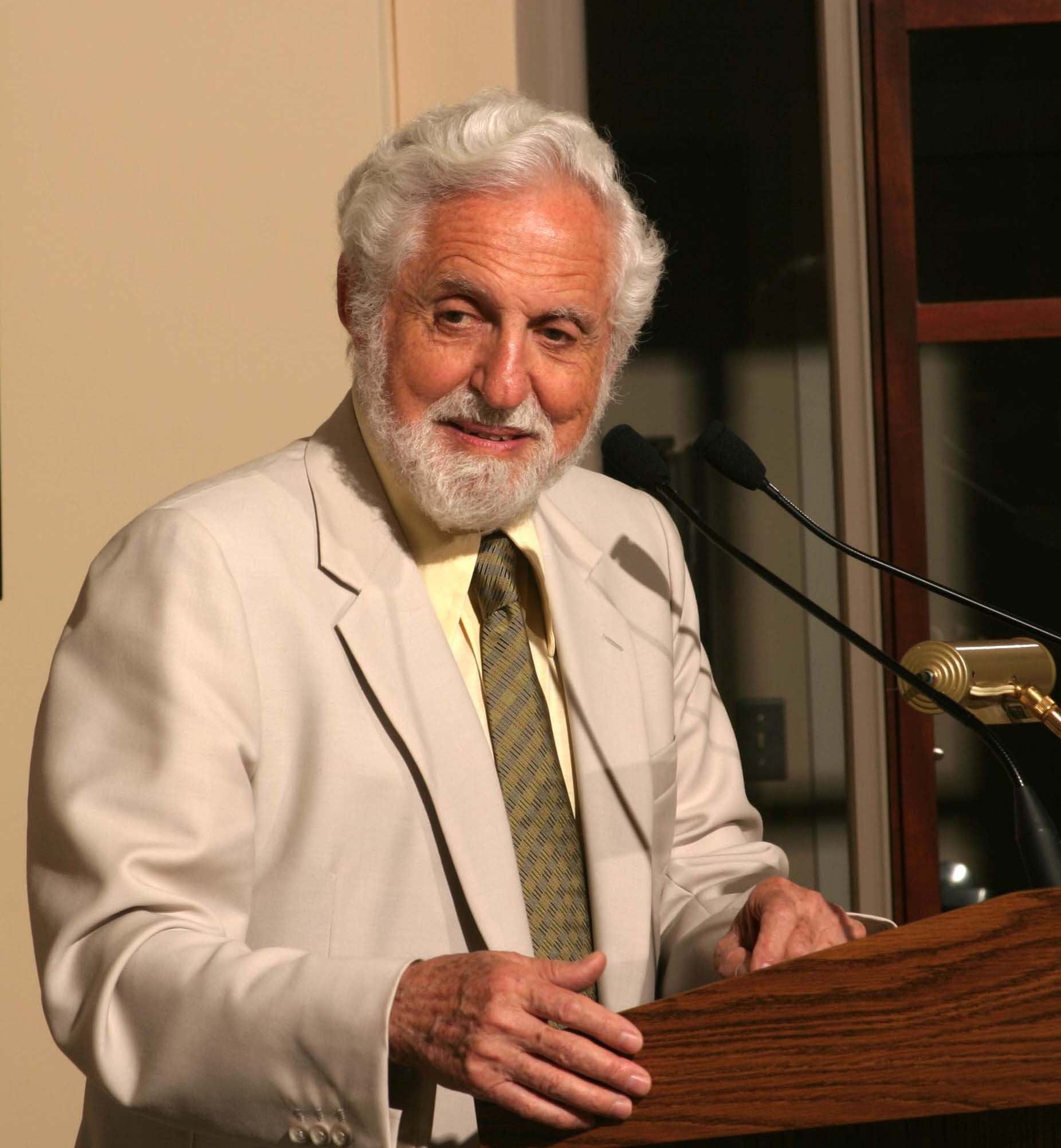
Carl Djerassi (2000;
photo from 2004)

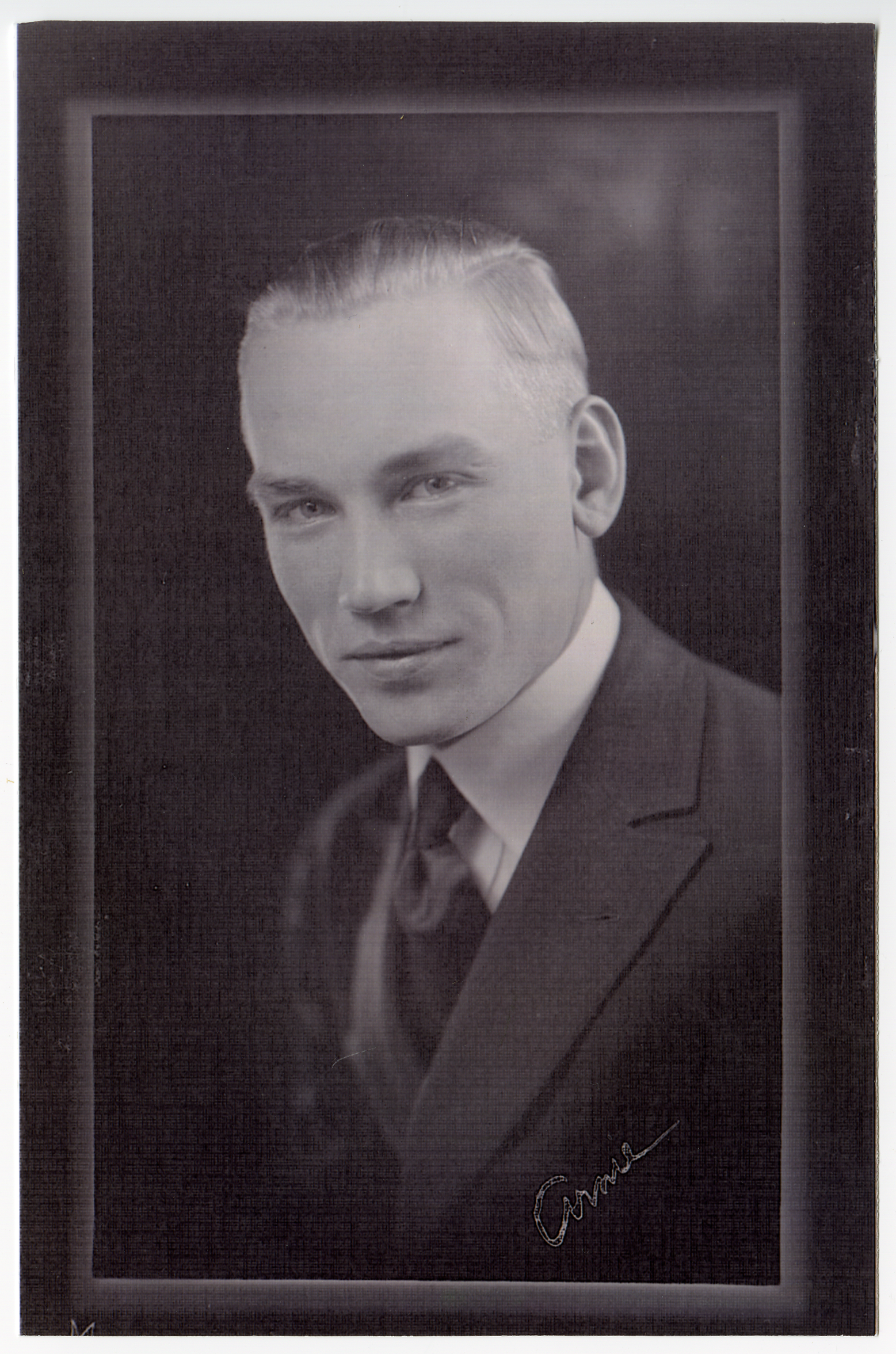
Arnold Beckman (2000 Millennium;
photo ca. 1921)

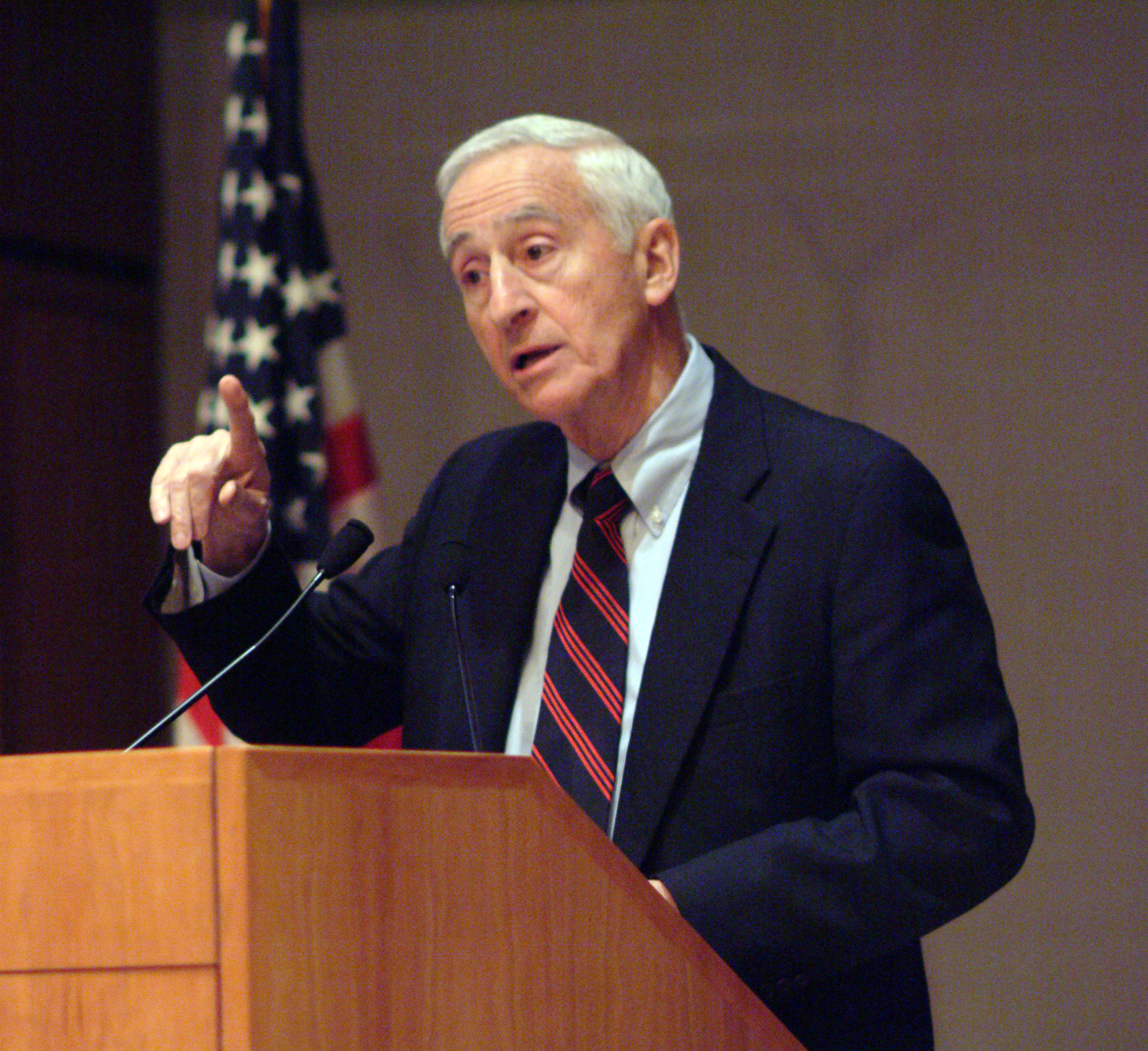
P. Roy Vagelos (1999;
photo from 2005)

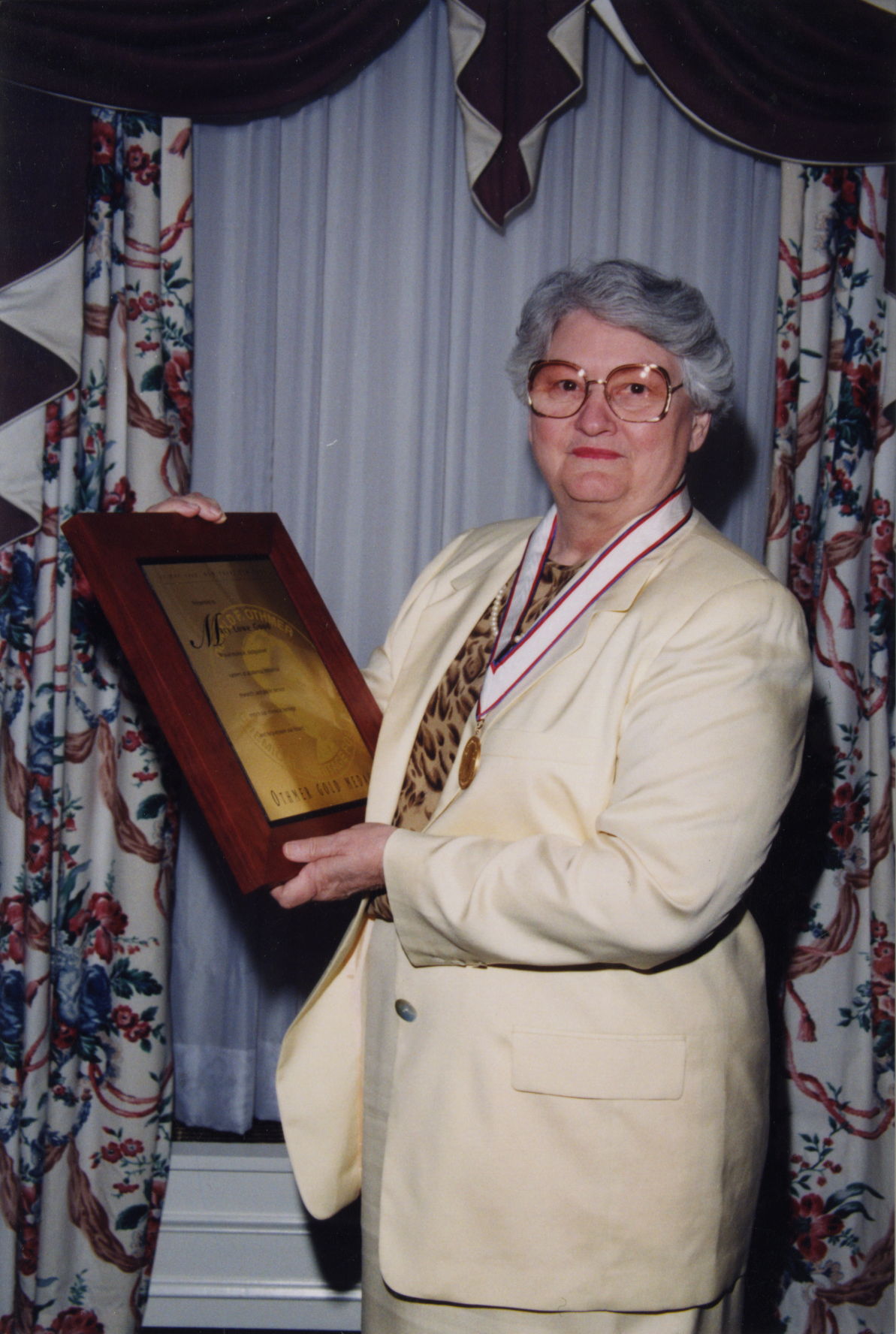
Mary Lowe Good (1998)

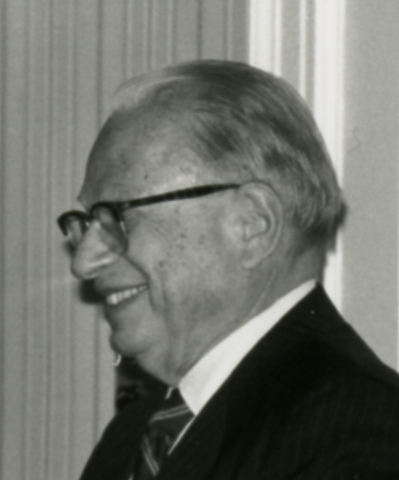
Ralph Landau (1997)

== See also ==
- List of chemistry awards
