= Sarong Girl =

1943 film directed by Arthur Dreifuss

- Theatrical release poster
- Directed by: Arthur Dreifuss
- Screenplay by: Charles R. Marion; Arthur Hoerl; Tim Ryan
- Produced by: Philip N. Krasne
- Starring: Ann Corio; Tim Ryan; Irene Ryan; Mantan Moreland; William Henry; Damian O'Flynn; Johnnie Davis
- Cinematography: Mack Stengler
- Edited by: Carl Pierson
- Production company: Monogram Pictures
- Distributed by: Monogram Pictures
- Release date: June 11, 1943
- Running time: 70 minutes
- Country: United States
- Language: English

Sarong Girl is a 1943 American comedy film directed by Arthur Dreifuss and written by Charles R. Marion, Arthur Hoerl and Tim Ryan. The film stars Ann Corio, Tim Ryan, Irene Ryan, Mantan Moreland, William Henry, Damian O'Flynn and Johnnie Davis. The film was released on June 11, 1943, by Monogram Pictures.

== Cast ==
- Ann Corio as Dixie Barlow
- Tim Ryan as Tim Raynor
- Irene Ryan as Irene Raynor
- Mantan Moreland as Maxwell
- William Henry as Jeff Baxter
- Damian O'Flynn as Gil Gailord
- Johnnie Davis as Scat Davis
- Gwen Kenyon as Barbara
- Henry Kolker as Mr. Jefferson Baxter
- Mary Gordon as Mattie
- Charles Williams as Mr. Chase
- Betty Blythe as Miss Ellsworth
- Lorraine Krueger as Blonde Bridesmaid
- Paul Bryar as Jake
- Charles Jordan as Sergeant O'Brien
