= Mr. Chump =

- Directed by: William Clemens
- Screenplay by: George Bricker
- Produced by: Bryan Foy
- Starring: Johnnie Davis; Lola Lane; Penny Singleton; Donald Briggs; Chester Clute; Frank Orth
- Cinematography: Arthur Edeson
- Edited by: Harold McLernon
- Music by: Howard Jackson
- Production company: Warner Bros. Pictures
- Distributed by: Warner Bros. Pictures
- Release date: August 8, 1938
- Running time: 60 minutes
- Country: United States
- Language: English

Mr. Chump is a 1938 American musical comedy film directed by William Clemens and written by George Bricker. The film stars Johnnie Davis, Lola Lane, Penny Singleton, Donald Briggs, Chester Clute and Frank Orth. The film was released by Warner Bros. Pictures on August 8, 1938.

== Plot ==
Small-town layabout Bill "Scats" Small is a whiz at figuring out the stock market, but he has no money to actually invest in it. He prefers not to do any actual work and is happier just playing his trumpet, annoying the family he rooms with. Eventually, he gets a job with a touring band, but when next he returns home, he finds himself in a hotbed of romantic and larcenous intrigue and has to use all his wiles to clean up both messes.

== Cast ==
- Johnnie Davis as Bill Small
- Lola Lane as Jane Mason
- Penny Singleton as Betty Martin
- Donald Briggs as Jim Belden
- Chester Clute as Ed Mason
- Frank Orth as Sheriff Frank Hinton
- Granville Bates as Abner Sprague
- Spencer Charters as Mr. Koeper
