= Ellen J. Kullman =

United States business executive (born 1956)

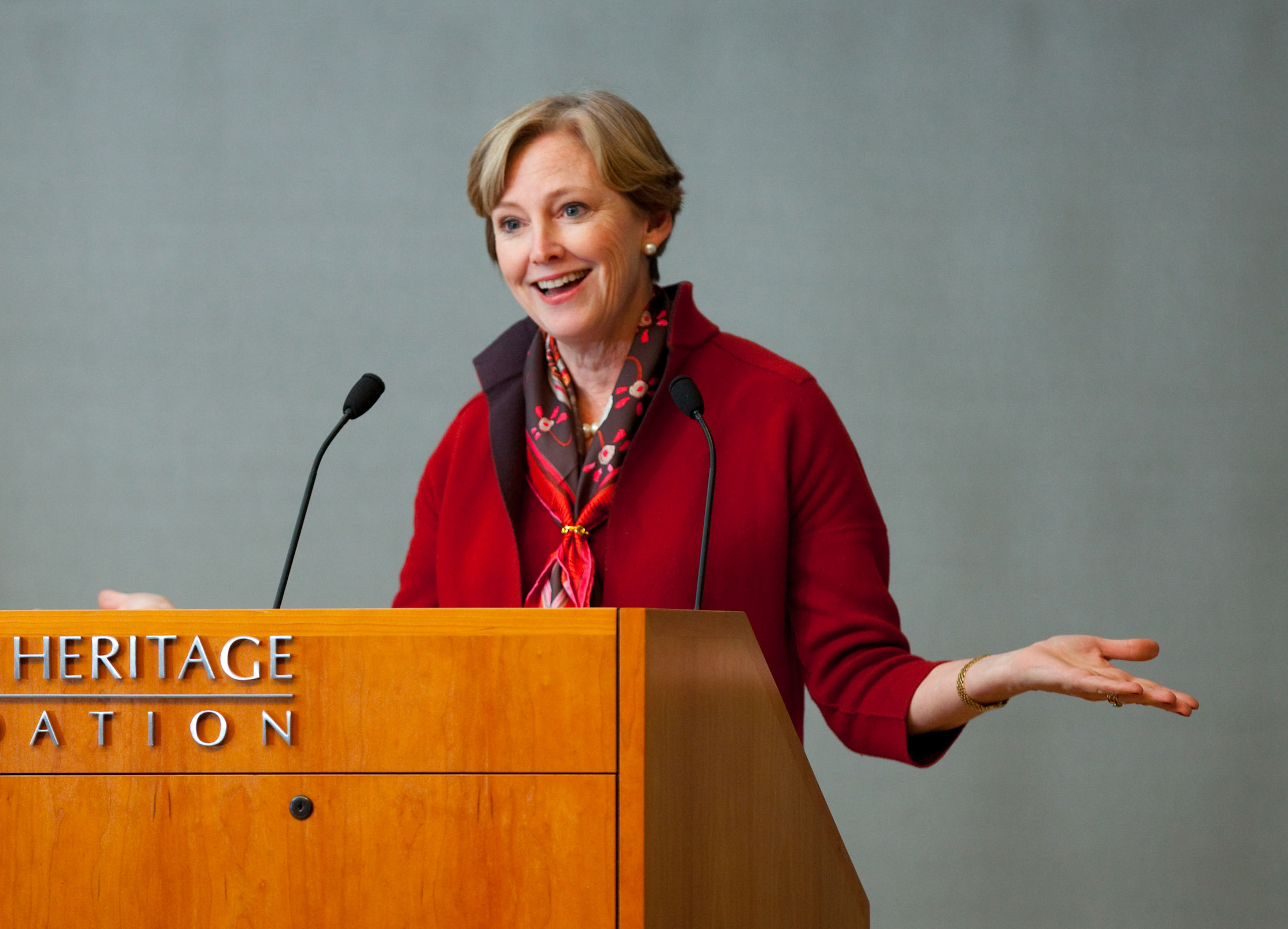
- Kullman in 2010
- Born: Ellen Jamison; January 22, 1956 (age 70); Wilmington, Delaware, US
- Education: Tufts University; Northwestern University
- Occupation: Business executive
- Title: CEO of Carbon
- Board member of: General Motors (2004–08); DuPont (2008–15); United Technologies (2009–present); Goldman Sachs (2016–present); Amgen (2016–present); Carbon (2016–present)
- Spouse: Michael Kullman

Ellen J. Kullman (born January 22, 1956) is a United States business executive. Since November 2019, she has been the chief executive officer of Carbon (company). She was formerly Chair and Chief Executive Officer of E. I. du Pont de Nemours and Company ("DuPont") in Wilmington and is a former director of General Motors. Forbes ranked her 31st of the 100 Most Powerful Women in 2014. Kullman retired from DuPont on October 16, 2015.

== Early life ==
Kullman was born Ellen Jamison in Wilmington, Delaware, the younger daughter of Joseph and Margaret Jamison. She has two older brothers and an older sister. Kullman attended Tower Hill School in Wilmington and then studied mechanical engineering at Tufts University, where she received her bachelor's degree in 1978. In 1983, she received a master's degree in management from Kellogg School of Management at Northwestern University.

== Career ==
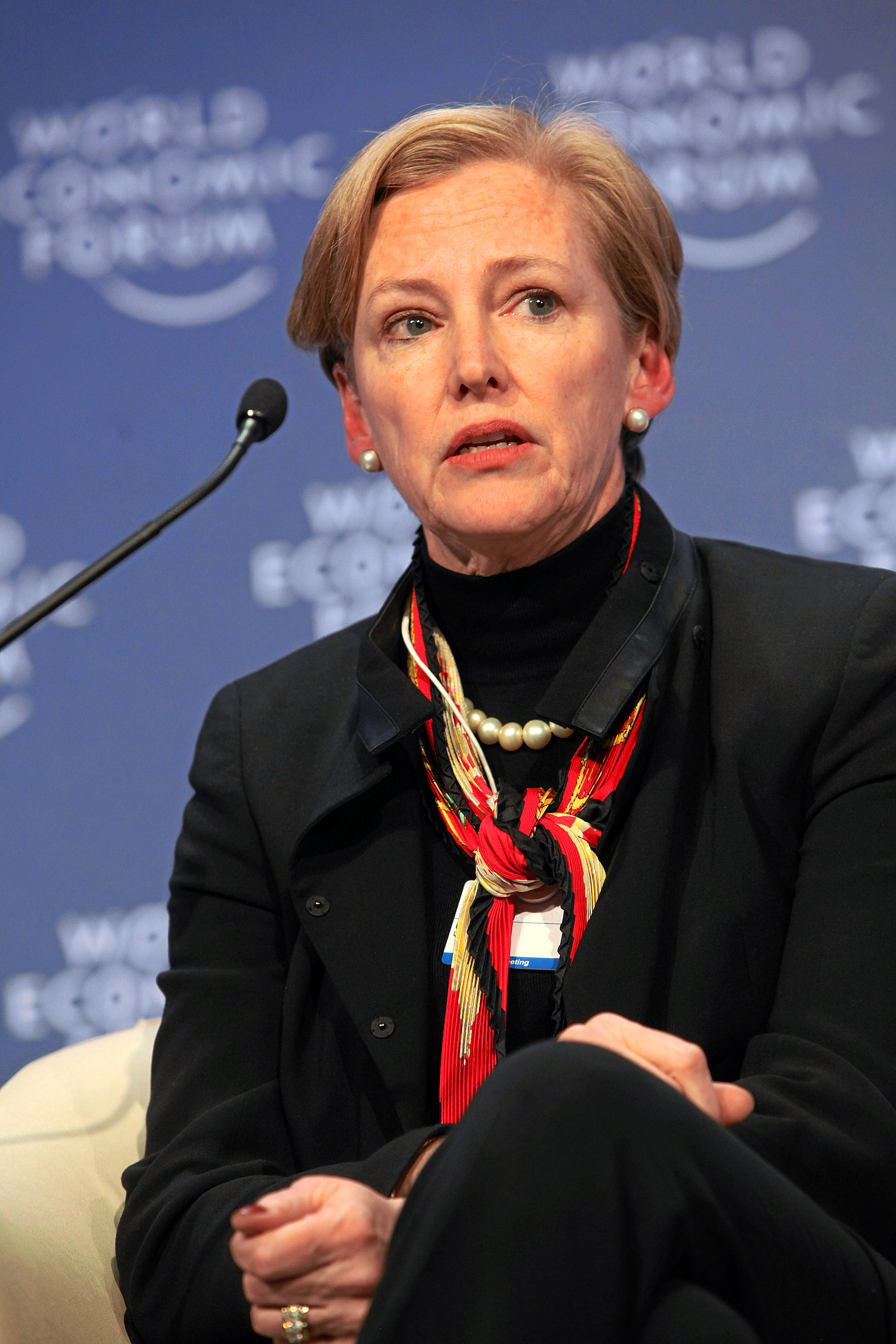
Kullman at the annual meeting of the World Economic Forum in Davos, Switzerland, January 30, 2009

Kullman began her business career at General Electric and joined DuPont in 1988 as marketing manager in the company's medical imaging business. In her later role as executive vice president she was responsible for four of DuPont's business platforms as well as for leading the company's growth in markets outside the USA.

DuPont's board of directors elected Kullman President and a director of the company, coming into effect October 1, 2008, and Chief Executive Officer, coming into effect January 1, 2009. She was the nineteenth executive, and the first woman, to lead the company in its 212-year history. Fortune magazine named Kullman fifteenth in its list of the world's fifty most powerful women for 2008, and fifth on the list for 2009 and 2010. In 2014 she was ranked as the 31st most powerful woman in the world, up from 42nd in 2013. The Wall Street Journal named her eighth on its 2008 list of "Women to Watch".

Kullman was a director of General Motors from 2004 to 2008 and was elected to the board of trustees of Tufts University in 2006.

On October 30, 2009, DuPont announced that its board of directors had elected Kullman as Chair of the company effective December 31, 2009.

She was a member of the Executive Committee of The Business Council for 2011 - 2013.

On June 6, 2013 the US-China Business Council announced that Kullman had been elected as its Chair.

Kullman's retirement was announced by DuPont on October 5, 2015 (effective October 16, 2015) following a battle with activist investor Nelson Peltz and Trian Fund Management, his investment firm. Peltz sought 4 board seats and argued that DuPont needed to cut costs and meet financial targets, but had lost a shareholder vote earlier in the year.

On October 14, 2016, Amgen appointed Kullman to its board of directors.

On December 21, 2016, Kullman joined the board of directors of The Goldman Sachs Group, Inc. as an independent director.

== Awards and honors ==
External videos
- "George Washington Carver Award acceptance speech", Ellen Kullman, Biotechnology Innovation Organization

Kullman has been awarded Sellinger's Business Leader of the Year. In 2014, she was given the George Washington Carver Award for innovation in industrial biotechnology. She is the first woman to receive the award. In 2015, Kullman received the International Palladium Medal from the Société de Chimie Industrielle (American Section), the Engineering Leader of the Year Award, the Pete du Pont Individual Freedom Award, and Delaware's Order of the First State. She is also a recipient of the Msgr. Thomas J. Reese Award from Catholic Charities.

Kullman was elected a member of the National Academy of Engineering in 2015 for leadership in the business growth and transformation of a global science and engineering company.

In 2020, Kullman was named as one of the Top 50 Best CEOs for Small/Mid-Size companies by Comparably.

== Controversy ==
In October 2019, Kullman responded to accusations that in her role as CEO of DuPont, she inappropriately delegated DuPont's environmental liabilities to a spin-off company, Chemours. DuPont incurred environmental liabilities as a result of contaminating drinking water with Perfluorooctanoic acid, a chemical which is harmful to humans and the environment, and is known to be the cause of multiple diseases in humans and animals, including cancers and birth defects, and has resulted in cancer in 2,507 individuals living in Wood County, West Virginia.

On March 26, 2018, Kullman's alma mater Tufts University announced they would be awarding her an honorary degree. In the weeks leading up to graduation, this was met by University-wide outrage. During her speech at the University's graduation, hundreds of students protested with signs and turned their backs to her.

== Personal life ==
Kullman is married to Michael Kullman and they have three children.
