= International Palladium Medal =

- Awarded for: Given roughly every two years for "outstanding contribution to the chemical industry."
- Date: 1961
- Location: New York City
- Presented by: Société de Chimie Industrielle (American)
- Website: http://www.societe.org/content.aspx?page_id=22&club_id=11039&module_id=175621

The International Palladium Medal is an award given annually by the Société de Chimie Industrielle (American Section) in New York to someone who has made outstanding contributions to the chemical industry on an international level. When founded in 1918, the Société de Chimie Industrielle in New York was an American section of an international organization based in Paris. It is currently an independent society.

The International Palladium Medal was instituted in 1958 and first awarded in 1961. The first recipient was Ernest-John Solvay, for his "untiring efforts to promote freer exchange of both technical information and products of chemistry." The medal has generally been given every two years. It has been awarded to recipients from America, Belgium, France, Germany and Great Britain.

== Recipients ==
- 1961 Ernest-John Solvay
- 1963 Charles Allen Thomas
- 1964 Monroe Jackson Rathbone II
- 1965 Paul Toinet
- 1967 Henry Smith Wingate
- 1968 Karl Winnacker (50th anniversary congress of the Société de Chimie Industrielle)
- 1972 William Wayne Keeler
- 1974 J. Peter Grace
- 1977 Werner C. Brown
- 1979 Edward R. Kane
- 1981 Paul F. Oreffice
- 1983 Thomas G. Gibian
- 1985 Gerald D. Laubach
- 1987 Harry Corless
- 1989 Konrad M. Weis
- 1991 Robert D. Kennedy
- 1993 Jean-René Fourtou
- 1994 Frank Popoff
- 1995 Edgar S. Woolard, Jr.
- 1997 Thomas L. Gossage
- 1999 Earnest W. Deavenport, Jr.
- 2001 William S. Stavropoulos
- 2003 Vincent A. Calarco
- 2005 Jürgen F. Strube
- 2007 Jeffrey M. Lipton
- 2009 Chad O. Holliday, Jr.
- 2011 Stephanie A. Burns
- 2013 Andrew N. Liveris
- 2015 Ellen Kullman
- 2017, Seifi Ghasemi
- 2019, Pierre Brondeau

== See also ==
- List of chemistry awards
