= Leo Baxter =

- Born: Leo Baxter; 1893; Clay County, Indiana, United States
- Died: August 17, 1976 (aged 82–83)
- Genres: Big band, jazz
- Occupations: Musician, bandleader
- Instrument: Piano

Leo Baxter (1893 - August 17, 1976) was an American Big Band leader and jazz pianist.

== Early life ==
Baxter was born in northern Clay County, Indiana, in 1893. He lost his parents when he a small child and he was raised by an aunt and uncle. His uncle died and he and his aunt moved to Terre Haute in 1901. His first musical lessons were from a coal miner, then he took lessons from a sister at St. Benedict's Church. Later he received lessons from Hermann Liebing where he studied classical piano and pipe organ. This took place at Hermann Liebing's studio which was only a few blocks from Baxter's home.

By the time he was a teenager, Baxter was playing piano at a restaurant at 106 S. Fourth St. He was also and selling pianos at a music store on Wabash Ave. He played piano at the Savoy and on river boats while still at high school.

After serving in the first world war, he formed a theater orchestra at the Varieties vaudeville house, later to be renamed the Liberty when silent cinema became the fashion. When his band finished performing at the theater each night, they would move to the Trianon Dance Hall or the Tokio Dance Hall and play well into the night.

Leo Baxter would later become WBOW's Program Director and would work this as a day job for 27 years. He remained active in music right up until a few months before his death in 1976 at age 83.

== Leo Baxter Orchestra ==
The Leo Baxter Orchestra, led by Leo Baxter were thought to be among finest dance bands from Terre Haute, Indiana in the 1920s. They were the pit band at the Liberty Theater. The orchestra also played at the Tokio Dance Hall and the Trianon. With the event of "Talkies", sound movies the need for theater pit bands sagged but the Baxter Orchestra remained popular and in demand around vaudeville houses, dance halls and roadhouses.

One of the musicians to come through the Leo Baxter Orchestra was Johnnie "Scat" Davis who would later become a film actor. His younger brother Art Davis also worked for Baxter.

Leo Baxter's Liberty Boys Orchestra, can be considered one of the longest or oldest playing bands because it has continued and has been described as a "ghost" band with David Watkins playing Leo's piano parts since 1988.

Two songs by the Leo Baxter Orchestra, "Heartaches" – Vocal by Donnie Grey and "Can I Depend on You?" – Vocal by Leo Baxter are featured on the Complete Meteor Blues R&b & Gospel Recordings CD.

== Discography ==
Single

- Heartaches / Can I depend on you? – Leo Baxter Orchestra – Meteor 5012, September 1953
- No Nights Without You / No Longer Wanted – Leo Baxter Orchestra – Duke 166 – 1957

Compilation

- Complete Meteor Blues R&b & Gospel Recordings – Various Artists – ACE – CDCH2 1090
