= Johnnie Davis =

American actor and singer

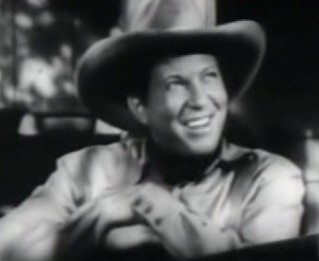
- from the trailer for the film Cowboy from Brooklyn (1938)
- Born: John Gustave Davis; April 11, 1910; Brazil, Indiana, US
- Died: October 28, 1983 (aged 73); Pecos, Texas, US
- Spouse: Martha Lee Garver (1934 - ?)

John Gustave Davis (April 11, 1910 – October 28, 1983) was an American actor, singer and trumpeter.

== Biography ==
Born in Brazil, Indiana, into a family of musicians, Davis developed an interest in music during his childhood. He learned to play the trumpet and by the age of 13 was performing with his grandfather's band. After graduating from high school he worked as a musician for several orchestras, including theater orchestras in nearby Terre Haute, Indiana, such as Paul Johnson's orchestra and the Leo Baxter Orchestra. Art Davis, his younger brother, also worked for Leo Baxter.

Davis's work with bands led him to discover and develop his ability as a scat singer. By 1933 was living in New York City. He formed his own trio and recorded several songs with them. From the mid-1930s, he worked with Fred Waring as a musician and vocalist, and his success during this time led him to Hollywood.

He appeared in his first feature-length film, Varsity Show, in 1937 and appeared the same year in the film Hollywood Hotel, where he introduced the Johnny Mercer song "Hooray for Hollywood". His lively rendition became popular and became closely associated with the film industry. He appeared in fifteen films, including Campus Cinderella (1938), Cowboy from Brooklyn (1938), Brother Rat (1938), Mr. Chump (1938), A Child Is Born (1939) and Sarong Girl (1943). Finally, in the documentary film "Jazz Ball" (1956), which collects 20 appearances by jazz stars of the '30s and '40s, Davis is featured singing Frank Loesser's hit song "Praise the Lord and Pass the Ammunition" (1942).

Davis's work on radio included being a vocalist on Nitwit Court.

Davis continued to work in the music industry throughout the 1940s and 1950s and spent several years in Detroit, Michigan, where he was a popular television performer.

Davis married Martha Lee Garver on April 2, 1934. He eventually settled in Texas and died in Pecos from a heart attack during a hunting trip.
