= William H. Winter =

American explorer (1819–1879)

William H. Winter (1819–1879) was an American explorer, miner / prospector, settler and diarist / co-author in the Western United States.

He was born in 1819 in Vigo County, Indiana. He later settled further west in Missouri in 1841. Two years later in 1843, he emigrated with friend Overton Johnson by covered wagon train on the westward Oregon Trail to the Oregon Country in the Pacific Northwest region of western North America.

Then later (without Johnson), went on further southwest on the California Trail to Alta California in Sonoma Valley the province of recently independent Mexico since 1821, along the California Pacific coast. Winter and Johnson published an account of their journey three years later in 1846 entitled Route across the Rocky Mountains with a Description of Oregon and California. The first six chapters were published in the Oregon Historical Quarterly, volume 7 (1906); (of the Oregon Historical Society, in Portland, Oregon, founded 1898). The full manuscript was re-published 26 years later by the Princeton University Press (1932), (of Princeton University in Princeton, New Jersey), which noted the significance of an important additional chapter which had not been published in the earlier O.H.Q. reprint of 1906, adding to greater historical understanding of the unfortunate Whitman massacre of November 1847, and the documentary record of the Oregon history, and neighboring Washington territorial / state histories and of Pacific Northwest region history along with that of the American frontier in the 19th century.

After returning to Indiana in 1845, he remained there for four years until 1849, when he returned west to California as part of the mass migration in the famous California gold rush of 1848–1852 nicknamed the "Forty-niners". He farmed for a while near Mokolumne, returned east to Indiana, and then journeyed again to Sonoma Valley by way of Texas, establishing a winery in the early 1870s. He eventually died at age 60 years old in 1879. He had five sons.
