= Robert K. Greenleaf =

Founder of the Servant Leadership movement

Robert Kiefner Greenleaf (1904–1990) was an American business executive and leadership consultant, and the founder of the modern servant leadership movement and the Greenleaf Center for Servant Leadership.

Greenleaf was born in Terre Haute, Indiana in 1904. After graduating from Carleton College in Minnesota, he went to work for AT&T, then the American Telephone and Telegraph Company. For the next 40 years he researched management, development, and education. He became suspicious that the power-centered authoritarian leadership style so prominent in U.S. institutions was not working, and in 1964, he took an early retirement to found the Greenleaf Center for Servant Leadership (initially called the Center for Applied Ethics).

== Philosophy ==
According to his essay "Essentials of Servant Leadership", Greenleaf's philosophy had its roots from reading a work of fiction in 1958:

The idea of the servant as leader came out of reading Hermann Hesse's Journey to the East. In this story, we see a band of men on a mythical journey...The central figure of the story is Leo, who accompanies the party as the servant who does their menial chores, but who also sustains them with his spirit and his song. He is a person of extraordinary presence. All goes well until Leo disappears. Then the group falls into disarray and the journey is abandoned. They cannot make it without the servant Leo. The narrator, one of the party, after some years of wandering, finds Leo and is taken into the Order that had sponsored the journey. There he discovers that Leo, whom he had known first as servant, was in fact the titular head of the Order, its guiding spirit, a great and noble leader.

A conceptual framework that is helpful for understanding servant-leadership is found in the "Ten Characteristics of the Servant-Leader" described by Larry Spears (1998). Spears distills Greenleaf's (1977/2002) instrumental means into ten characteristics: listening, empathy, healing, awareness, persuasion, conceptualization, foresight, stewardship, commitment to the growth of people, and building community (pp. 3–6). These characteristics are not simply traits or skills possessed by the leader; a century of research has rejected what Bass and Stogdill (1990) referred to as an "approach [that] tended to treat personality variables in an atomistic fashion, suggesting that each trait acts singly to determine the effects of leadership" (p. 87). Rather, servant-leadership is an ethical perspective on leadership that identifies key moral behaviors that leaders must continuously demonstrate in order to make progress on Greenleaf's (1977/2002) "best test". The "best test", which gives us the ethical ends for action, combined with Spears' distillation of traits that identified the means, create a powerful framework for a review of the literature that furthers the conceptual framework for servant-leadership.

== Works ==
Greenleaf was captivated by the idea of a servant being the leader. In "Essentials" he wrote "As it was, the idea lay dormant for 11 years during which I came to believe that we in this country were in a leadership crisis and that I should do what I could about it." In 1970 Greenleaf published his first essay, titled "The Servant as Leader", which introduced the term servant leadership. Later, the essay was expanded into a book in which Greenleaf elaborated on his philosophy of leadership.

Greenleaf wrote in "Essentials",

The servant-leader is servant first.… Becoming a servant-leader begins with the natural feeling that one wants to serve, to serve first. Then conscious choice brings one to aspire to lead. That person is sharply different from one who is leader first...The difference manifests itself in the care taken by the servant first to make sure that other people's highest priority needs are being served. The best test, and the most difficult to administer, is this: Do those served grow as persons? Do they, while being served, become healthier, wiser, freer, more autonomous, more likely themselves to become servants?

A fresh critical look is being taken at the issues of power and authority, and people are beginning to learn, however haltingly, to relate to one another in less coercive and more creatively supporting ways. A new moral principle is emerging, which holds that the only authority deserving of one's allegiance is that which is freely and knowingly granted by the led to the leader in response to, and in proportion to, the clearly evident servant stature of the leader. Those who choose to follow this principle will not casually accept the authority of existing institutions. Rather, they will freely respond only to individuals who are chosen as leaders because they are proven and trusted as servants. To the extent that this principle prevails in the future, the only truly viable institutions will be those that are predominantly servant led.

Greenleaf (2002) felt strongly that his "best test" should apply to all of our institutions. His "best test", which he knew would be hard to grade, is stated:

Do those served grow as persons? Do they, while being served, become healthier, wiser, freer, more autonomous, more likely themselves to become servants? And, what is the effect on the least privileged in society? Will they benefit or at least not be further deprived?

Implementing Greenleaf's ideas in modern American institutions is anathema to many leaders and followers who desire a different paradigm that is based on coercive power and control rather than legitimate power based on mutual agreements. Greenleaf's book, however, connects the two often disparate terms servant and leader. His work addresses these two questions in particular: How can leaders serve people? What is the source of legitimate power?

== Consulting work ==
Through the next 25 years, Greenleaf served as a consultant to such notable institutions as MIT, the American Foundation for Management Research, and Lilly Endowment, Inc. He continued writing, refining and focusing his ideas on several different areas of leadership. For example, to apply Servant Leadership to an organizational level, he wrote "The Institution as Servant". For educators, he wrote "The Leadership Crisis: A Message for College and University Faculty" and "Teacher as Servant". Other writings targeted seminaries, personal growth, religious leaders, and trustees.

== Legacy ==
In 1985, the Center for Applied Ethics changed its name to Greenleaf Center for Servant Leadership. Greenleaf died in 1990, and the center continued his work. In 1996, it published two posthumous essay collections. Many colleges and universities include Servant Leadership in their curricula, and hundreds of companies embrace Greenleaf's philosophy. Greenleaf is buried in Terre Haute; the epitaph on his tombstone reads, "Potentially a good plumber; ruined by a sophisticated education."
