= Société de Chimie Industrielle (American Section) =

- Formation: 1918
- Type: Learned society
- Headquarters: New York, NY
- Location: United States
- Official language: English
- Website: www.societe.org

The Société de Chimie Industrielle (American Section) is an independent learned society inspired by the creation of the Société de Chimie Industrielle in Paris in 1917. The American Section was formed on January 18, 1918, and held its first meeting on April 4, 1918.

The Société de Chimie Industrielle (American Section) hosts speakers, grants scholarships, and gives awards. It has given the International Palladium Medal roughly every second year since 1961, and helps to award the Othmer Gold Medal and the Winthrop-Sears Medal every year. The Société also hosts monthly talks, and presents scholarships to writers, educators, and historians of science.

== History ==
One of the first societies for chemists was the Society of Chemical Industry, founded in London in 1881. This inspired a number of other groups, including the Société de Chimie Industrielle in Paris, France. The French Société was modeled on the British organization in 1917. A number of those active in forming the French Société were elected to its first set of officers, which included industrialist Paul Kestner as president, vice-presidents Albin Haller and Henry Louis Le Châtelier, and Jean Gérard as general secretary.

Creation of the French Société in turn inspired creation of a related American association in New York in 1918. This was part of an effort to rebuild international connections between individuals and institutions that had been disrupted during the First World War. René Laurent Engel encouraged the re-establishment of ties between chemists in the two countries in his position as the scientific representative in a French Mission to the United States. Victor Grignard of the University of Nancy also encouraged the creation of an American organization. A circular appealed to the Chemists and Manufacturers of America to "extend to our French fellow chemists and manufacturers our moral and financial support and the right hand of good fellowship."

The American section of the Société de Chimie Industrielle was formed on January 18, 1918, following the presentation of the Perkin Medal by the Society of Chemical Industry (American Section) at The Chemists' Club in New York. Engel, as secretary of the parent organization, addressed the meeting. Officers of the newly created American section of the Société de Chimie Industrielle included Leo Baekeland as president, Jerome Alexander as vice-president, Charles Avery Doremus as secretary, and George Frederick Kunz as treasurer. A report describes the Société's purpose as follows:

The outstanding objects of the new society are to aid the development of all branches of chemical industry, to co-ordinate the labours of all workers in pure and applied chemistry for their mutual advantage, and to assist the progress of industrial chemistry not only by means of science, but also from the economic and commercial points of view.

The first official meeting of the American section of the Société de Chimie Industrielle was held on April 4, 1918 at The Chemists' Club in New York. William H. Nichols, president of the American Chemical Society, welcomed the new organization. Frederick J. LeMaistre reported on "Conditions in the French chemical industries during 1916".

== Governance ==
The Société de Chimie Industrielle (American Section) is now an independent organization. It was granted tax status as a 501(c)(3), a registered nonprofit organization as of 1952. The American Section is directed by a board of officers including a president. As of 2018, the president of the Société de Chimie Industrielle (American section) is [James M. Weatherall].

== Activities ==
=== Awards ===
The International Palladium Medal was instituted in 1958 and first awarded in 1961. The first recipient was Ernest-John Solvay. The medal has generally been given every two years.

The Société has also been involved in nominating and choosing the recipients of the Othmer Gold Medal and the Winthrop-Sears Medal, which are given yearly.

=== Events ===
The Société supports a program of monthly speakers featuring CEOs, government leaders, and scientists.

=== Scholarships ===
The Société funds scholarships for writers, educators, and historians who place chemistry in historical perspective and explore the influence of chemistry on everyday life.
