= Swope Art Museum =

- Location within Indiana
- Established: 1942
- Location: Terre Haute, Indiana
- Coordinates: 39.4657°N 87.4073°W
- Type: Art museum
- Collection size: More than 2,000 works
- Director: Anthony J. Dinkel
- Website: www.swope.org

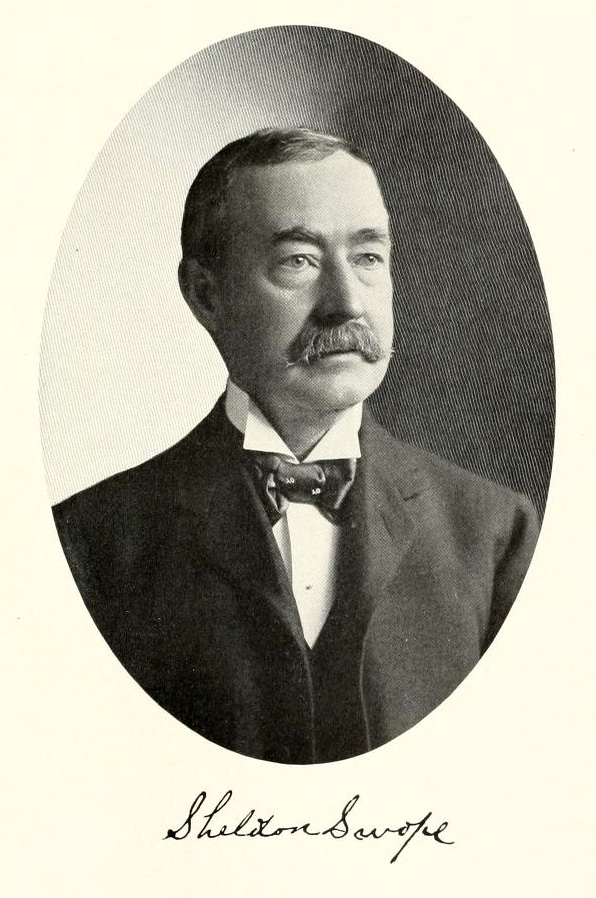
Sheldon Swope, circa 1908

The Sheldon Swope Art Museum in Terre Haute, Indiana, United States, was originally funded by a bequest from Michael Sheldon Swope (1843–1929), a Civil War veteran and jeweler who lived in Terre Haute much of his adult life. Planning for the art museum began on September 26, 1939, and the museum was officially open to the public on March 21, 1942. According to its mission statement, "The Sheldon Swope Art Museum collects, preserves and celebrates the best in American art with programs and exhibitions designed to engage, stimulate and educate those whose lives it touches; it enhances the culture and contributes to the economic development of the Greater Wabash Valley."

In addition to housing numerous important works, the Swope Art Museum offers classes for youth, artist lectures and exhibitions. It sponsors an annual student art exhibition, a tradition which began in May 1967. Admission to the museum is free.

== Collection ==
The founding collection of the museum, assembled by its first director John Rogers Cox, focuses on American regionalism and consists of works by Grant Wood, Thomas Hart Benton, Edward Hopper, Charles Burchfield and Zoltan Sepeshy. The museum has expanded to include art from the second half of the 20th century and early 21st century, including works by Robert Rauschenberg, Andy Warhol, Alexander Calder, Robert Motherwell, Robert Indiana and Eva Hesse. One gallery is devoted the Hoosier Group and Indiana artists.

Terre Haute artists in the Swope collection include Ray H. French, James Farrington Gookins, Janet Scudder, Amalia Küssner Coudert, Caroline Peddle Ball, Gilbert Wilson and Leroy Lamis.

In its many temporary exhibitions, the Swope Art Museum has highlighted work from numerous local artists including Sister Edith Pfau and John Laska.

== Recognition ==
In November 2010, USA Today named the Swope one of ten great places to see art in smaller cities.
