= Elisabeth Martini =

American architect

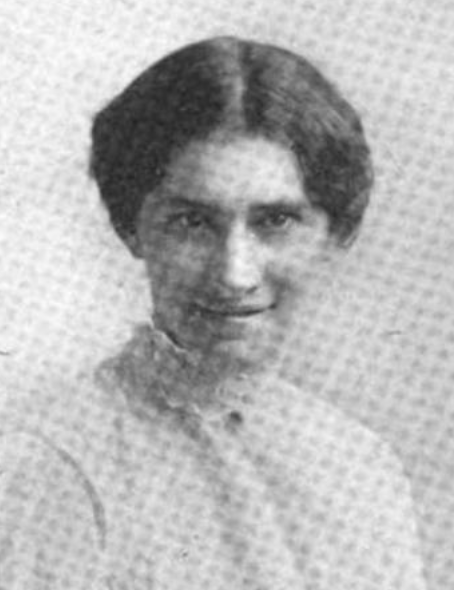
- Martini, from a 1914 publication
- Born: 1886; Brooklyn, New York
- Died: 1984 (aged 97–98); Pleasant Hill, Tennessee
- Other name: Elisabeth A. Martini
- Occupation: architect

Elisabeth A. Martini (1886–1984) was an American architect who was a member of the second generation of women architects in Chicago. She was the first woman to be the sole owner of an architectural firm in Chicago, and she founded the Chicago Drafting Club, one of the first organizations for women architects and a precursor of the Women's Architectural Club founded by Juliet Peddle and Bertha Yerex Whitman.

== Early life and education ==
Not a great deal is known about Martini's family or formative years. She was born in Brooklyn in 1886 and went to high school in Fitchburg, Massachusetts. She got her architectural training at the Pratt Institute in 1908 and also took some courses at Columbia University. After some travels in Europe, she moved to Chicago in 1909.

== Architectural career ==
Martini was initially rejected by some ninety firms in her search for architectural work, on at least two occasions because the firms refused to have women in their drafting rooms. She then changed her approach: she went to business school and obtained a secretarial job at an architectural firm, a position she leveraged to shift into drafting. She ended up working as a draughtsperson for a number of Chicago-area architects including John B. Sutcliffe, who specialized in churches. In 1913, when she took and passed her Illinois licensing exam, she was the only woman of the 86 applicants; and, following the departure of Marion Mahony Griffin in 1914, she would for some years be the only woman architect licensed in private practice by the state of Illinois.

Martini opened her own office in 1914, becoming the first woman who was sole owner of an architectural firm in Chicago. The bulk of her work was commissions for residences, but she would also do rush work for other local architects. Her largest commission was a 1928 church complex, St. Luke's Lutheran in Park Ridge, Illinois, the design of which is an adaptation of English Gothic architecture. In lieu of a flat fee, Martini received $60 a month for life.

In 1921, Martini put an ad in a paper reading: "Only girl architect lonely. Wanted—to meet all the women architects in Chicago to form a club." Out of this came the Chicago Drafting Club, which later merged with the Women's Architectural Club, which in turn merged with the still-extant organization Chicago Women in Architecture.

In 1934, Martini moved her architectural practice to Bangor, Michigan, and became a member of the American Institute of Architects.

Martini died in Pleasant Hill, Tennessee, at the age of 98.
