= John Rogers Cox =

American painter (1915–1990)

- Gray and Gold, 1942, oil on canvas, Cleveland Museum of Art
- Born: March 24, 1915; Terre Haute, Indiana
- Died: January 25, 1990 (aged 74); Louisville, Kentucky
- Education: Pennsylvania Academy of Fine Arts
- Known for: Painting
- Movement: Regionalist; American scene painting Magic realism

John Rogers Cox (March 24, 1915 – January 25, 1990) was an American painter from Terre Haute, Indiana. His style and subject matter align him with the Regionalist (American scene painting) and Magic Realist landscape tradition.

== Early life and education ==
Cox was born in Terre Haute, Indiana in 1915. His father, Wilson Naylor Cox, was president of the Terre Haute National Bank, later Terre Haute First National Bank. John Rogers was one of four brothers, Wilson Naylor "W.N." Cox Jr., the eldest, born in 1909, Francis "Fritz" Gardenhire Cox, the next oldest born two years later, and twins John Rogers and Benjamin Guille born on March 24, 1915. Cox's parents sent him to the University of Pennsylvania to study business but he later enrolled in a Bachelor of Fine Arts program conducted jointly by the University of Pennsylvania and the Pennsylvania Academy of the Fine Arts. He graduated in 1938. After failing to find a commercial arts job in New York he returned to Terre Haute and found work as a bank messenger and later a teller. He married Mary Hermine Mayer, a Terre Haute local, on December 27, 1939, and they eventually had three children, two sons, John Rogers Cox Jr. and Henry Douglas Cox and a daughter, Janet Naylor Cox, born in 1943 who died in childhood.

== Career ==
Cox left his job at the bank in 1941 and was appointed the first director of the newly formed Sheldon Swope Art Gallery in Terre Haute having been offered the position by William T. Turman, professor of art at Indiana State Teachers College, a recognized artist and chief adviser to the Swope. Cox, describing Turman's job offer, said "When I heard the word 'painting' and when he offered me $600 a year more than I was making, it didn't take me more than a minute to say yes!" At 26, he was the youngest museum director in the U.S. Cox and his wife Hermine made several trips to New York City to buy art for the gallery. His objective was to buy high quality works by living American artists which would be relatively affordable compared to works by European masters. He assembled the Swope's founding collection purchasing 23 paintings by living American artists in the 15 months before the inaugural show which contained new works by artists such as Grant Wood, Thomas Hart Benton, Charles Burchfield, Zoltan Sepeshy and Edward Hopper. Cox also arranged for the loan of several paintings and sculptures from the Museum of Modern Art in New York, the Whitney Museum of American Art and the Art Institute of Chicago and Carrie C. Schell, first secretary of the Board of Managers, contributed works by Terre Haute born artists Janet Scudder and Caroline Peddle Ball. The museum opened to the public on March 21, 1942, with an exhibition of more than 130 works in six exhibition rooms. Cox was the first name on the registry of guests for the show. In a review of the exhibition, the editor of The Art Digest, Peyton Boswell Jr., said that by building the collection around contemporary American artists, Cox and the Swope board of managers had chosen the path that "brought greatness to the Whitney Museum and to the Addison Gallery in Andover". Seventeen of the original 23 paintings remain at the Swope and the founding collection is still the feature for which the museum is best known.

Cox left the museum and enlisted in the US Army in 1943. He left the army in 1945 and decided to dedicate his time to painting. By 1948, Cox had completed nine paintings, sold seven, and won two important prizes. Life magazine included a double page color feature about Cox in its edition of July 12, 1948. The article included his painting Wheat and a self-portrait. Cox moved to Chicago in 1948 after the death of his daughter and the break-up of his marriage the previous year. He remained in Chicago, teaching at the School of the Art Institute of Chicago until 1965 where he specialized in figure drawing. After 1950 he focused on producing pen and pencil drawings rather than oil paintings.

== Later life ==
Cox eventually remarried in 1963 to Donise Kibby, a student of his at the Art Institute of Chicago. They moved several times from Chicago, to Galena, to New Orleans where they had one daughter, Sophia, in 1966. They then moved to Washington, finally settling in Wenatchee in the 1970s. They divorced in the mid-1980s, although they stayed in touch until John's move to Louisville, Kentucky, where he died on January 25, 1990, at the age of 74.

== Works ==
Cox's output as an artist was relatively modest but his works featured in numerous important annual living artist exhibitions during the 1940s and '50s. He worked slowly, painting his landscapes at home, from memory, often taking a year or two to finish a painting. His paintings number fewer than 20.

=== Gray and Gold (1942) ===
One of Cox's best known works is Gray and Gold from 1942, held in the permanent collection of the Cleveland Museum of Art. The painting was produced shortly after the United States joined the Second World War. It was Cox's second oil painting. The Cleveland Museum of Art bought the painting from a traveling exhibition, "Artists for Victory," consisting of works by artists who wanted to help in the war effort. The exhibition opened at the Metropolitan Museum of Art (The Met) in New York on December 7, 1942, the first anniversary of the attack on Pearl Harbor, and Cox's painting was awarded the Second Medal. The work also received the Popular Prize in the Carnegie Institute of Pittsburgh's annual "Painting in the United States" 1944 exhibition of paintings by living artists. The painting appears in the farmhouse's living room in the 2012 science fiction thriller Looper.

=== White Cloud (1943) ===
Cox's painting White Cloud was exhibited at the 1944 Painting in the United States Carnegie Survey show and won a 300 US dollar prize. Life magazine covered the exhibition and noted "Some critics believe that his stark landscapes will make him as famous as the late Grant Wood". Cox painted White Cloud in 1943, adding further details in 1946. The work was acquired by the Swope Art Museum in 2000. The painting depicts a dry and desolate landscape, with two trees and a barren field. An abandoned plow sits in the foreground and a large house can be seen in the distance. Brian Lee Whisenhunt, the Swope's director, noted "Despite the weathered and desolate scene, hope remains: a white cloud, voluptuous and full of promised rain, floats above the dry and parched landscape connoting a potentially better future." The painting was included in the Smithsonian American Art Museum's To Make a World: George Ault and 1940s America exhibition in 2011.

=== Cloud Trails (1944) ===
Cox's 1944 painting, Cloud Trails, consists of a landscape of precisely painted wheat stalks devoid of human figures under an expanse of blue sky with cloud trails and a full moon near the horizon. A barn in the landscape is covered with brightly colored advertisements typical of the artist's Midwestern hometown. The painting was purchased by the Saint Louis Art Museum in 2006 who describe it as one of Cox's "unsettling American Scene landscapes".

=== Wheat Fields (1949) ===
Cox's 1949 painting, Wheat Fields, uses a highly saturated palette of pinks, blues and oranges to portray what the Norton Museum of Art described as "a Midwestern version of a garden of plenty with an endlessly extended crop field". The painting was purchased by the Norton Museum in 2008.

=== Wheat Shocks (1951) ===
Cox only produced one lithograph, Wheat Shocks (1951). A signed print produced from the lithograph is held in the Cleveland Museum of Art's collections.

== Exhibitions ==
Work by Cox was included in the Indianapolis Museum of Art's 63rd Annual Exhibition of Contemporary American Paintings in 1951. The Sheldon Swope Gallery held a John Rogers Cox retrospective exhibition in 1982 on its 40th anniversary. The museum currently holds five works by Cox, including a self-portrait drawn in pencil and his portrait of William T. Turman.

== Critical reception ==
Art historian John I. H. Baur described Cox's work as an exemplar of "hard, immaculate-related realism" in his 1951 study Revolution and Tradition in Modern American Art for the Library of Congress. Michael D. Hall, describing Cox's work in an essay to accompany the Flint Institute of Arts's exhibition in 2003, Great Lakes Muse: American Scene Painting from the Upper Midwest, 1910 - 1960, said "His own signature landscape vistas are imaginary Midwestern places filled with emptiness-visual contradictions suffused with momentous and ominous signs."

== Cox on painting and his own work ==
Cox claimed to know nothing about painting in an interview for Life magazine in July 1948. He said that he intended to continue painting because he enjoyed it, adding "I'm too dumb to do anything else". Cox regarded the effect of painting as somewhat mysterious.

Good painting offers a mysterious pleasure that one cannot quite put his finger on because the painter, through honesty and hard work, has actually painted his own personality in a familiar subject; and any person's personality or character or soul, or whatever your word is for it, is something of an enigma.

— John Rogers Cox, 1951

Cox was interviewed about his work by the American Artist magazine in October 1951. He said the following about his working method.

I hardly ever paint a picture the same way twice. Sometime I make sketches before starting, sometimes I draw directly on the canvas or panel and then paint, and sometimes I just begin to paint directly. Other times I make detailed sketches of parts of my idea in oil on little panels and pieces of cardboard ... Hours are consumed rearranging these oil sketches in various compositions to find what shape of picture I want.

— John Rogers Cox, 1951

== List of works ==
- Bomber Bar, 1941, oil on panel, 29 in × 24 in (74 cm × 61 cm), Collection of Guille and Cindy Cox.
- Gray and Gold, 1942, oil on canvas, 91.5 cm × 151.8 cm (36.0 in × 59.8 in), Cleveland Museum of Art.
- Ominous Cloud, 1943, oil on panel, 16 in × 20 in (41 cm × 51 cm), Collection of Rex and Jeanne Sinquefield.
- White Cloud, 1943 (some details added by Cox in 1946), oil and acrylic on canvas, 37 in × 45.5 in (94 cm × 116 cm), Swope Art Museum Collection.
- Cloud Trails, 1944, oil on canvas, Saint Louis Art Museum.
- Self Portrait, 1945, oil on canvas, 14 in × 12 in (36 cm × 30 cm), Collection of Jane Cunningham McLagan.
- Tall Grass, c. 1945, sold to a Washington, D.C. collector in 1945.
- Wheat, 1946, awarded the 1946 Carnegie Popular Prize, purchased by the National Bank of New York City.
- Approaching Storm, 1947, oil on canvas, 18 in × 26 in (46 cm × 66 cm)
- The Meadow, 1948, oil on canvas, exhibited at the "Fifty Third Annual Exhibition by Artists of Chicago and Vicinity Art" held by the Institute of Chicago in 1949. The painting's price was $600.
- Wheat Fields, 1949, oil on canvas, 31 in × 45 in (79 cm × 114 cm), Norton Museum of Art.
- Untitled, 1950, oil on board, 22 in × 17 in (56 cm × 43 cm).
- Wheat Shocks, 1951, lithograph, Cleveland Museum of Art.
- Nocturne - Silver and Grey, 1952, oil and tempera on Masonite, 17 in × 23.875 in (43.18 cm × 60.64 cm), Flint Institute of Arts.
- Untitled (Woman in Landscape), 1955–60, oil on panel, 36 in × 21.5 in (91 cm × 55 cm), John and Susan Horseman Collection.
- July, Michele & Donald D'Amour Museum of Fine Arts
- Swamp, 1969, oil on wood panel, 20 in × 30 in (51 cm × 76 cm), Hirschl & Adler.
- The Occupant , 1982, oil on canvas, 24 in × 36 in (61 cm × 91 cm), Swope Art Museum.
