= David A. Kofke =

American chemical engineer

David A. Kofke is an American chemical engineer, currently SUNY Distinguished Professor at State University of New York. He is a Fellow of American Institute of Chemical Engineers.
