= James Conwell =

James Conwell may refer to:

- James C. Conwell, president of Rose-Hulman Institute of Technology
- James Simpson Conwell, businessman, inventor and local politician in Illinois and California
