= John J. Midgley =

John Joseph "Jack" Midgley Jr. (born 25 May 1954) is an educator, management consultant and former US Army officer from Pittsburgh, Pennsylvania, USA. He has been on the faculties of Carnegie Mellon University, the University of Pittsburgh and the United States Military Academy, and held executive positions with Ernst & Young, the Ronald Reagan Presidential Foundation and Center for Public Affairs before being asked to resign, Roland Berger Strategy Consultants and Commerce One. During the 2004-2005 academic year, he briefly held the presidency of the Rose-Hulman Institute of Technology, and subsequently joined TriNet, Inc. as Vice President, Human Capital Consulting, and then later Deloitte Consulting LLP.

Born in Pennsylvania, Midgley earned his Bachelor of Science degree from United States Military Academy in 1976. He also holds a degree in public policy from Harvard University and completed a Ph.D. in political science at the Massachusetts Institute of Technology in 1985. His doctoral thesis was entitled U.S. Army designs for the nuclear battlefield 1945-1977 and his advisor was William W. Kaufmann. Midgley is also a graduate of the Army Command and General Staff College.

Prior to his work in education and the private sector, Midgley served as a commissioned officer in the United States Army. There, he worked with Army General Staff, the Strategy Plans and Policy Directorate of the Organization of the Joint Chiefs of Staff, and the U.S. mission to NATO. He was awarded the Meritorious Service Medal and the Army Commendation Medal.

Midgley was chosen to be the 12th president of the Rose-Hulman Institute of Technology in 2004, after Samuel F. Hulbert, the engineering college's longest-serving president, stepped down. Strife between his administration and other parts of the Institute came swiftly. In January 2005 the president and the executive vice president of Rose-Hulman Ventures, a business and technology incubator affiliated with the Institute, abruptly asked to return to faculty status amid rumors of conflicts with Dr. Midgley. In March of that year, a memo citing concerns from the school's Faculty Affairs Committee was leaked to the Terre Haute Tribune Star, a local newspaper. A student-run website, called "About Midgley", soon appeared where faculty, students, and alumni posted their complaints and support. On 29 April 2005, a group of students held a rally citing concerns with Dr. Midgley, with some calling for him to step down. Days later, a faculty meeting approved a vote of no confidence 87 to 42, and forwarded a transcript of the meeting and the vote to the school's board of trustees. Midgley resigned from his position on 11 June 2005, less than a year after he took office.

After leaving Rose, Midgley served as a Vice President at TriNet and as a civilian consultant to the US Combined Joint Interagency Task Force 435 deployed in Afghanistan. As of May 2016, he was a Director at Deloitte Consulting's defense consulting practice, concerning the Japan region.
