= Charles Catlin =

Charles Catlin may refer to:

- Charles A. Catlin (1849–1916), American chemist and inventor
- Charles L. Catlin (1842–1901), American lawyer and politician
