= Richard Smoke =

American historian (1944–1995)

Richard Smoke (October 21, 1944, Huntingdon, Pennsylvania – May 1995, Sarasota, California) was an American historian and political scientist.

== Life ==
He graduated from Harvard University magna cum laude in 1965, and from the Massachusetts Institute of Technology with a Ph.D. in political science in 1972. His doctoral thesis was entitled Toward the control of escalation: a historical analysis and his advisor was William W. Kaufmann. A professor of political science, he became the Research Director of the Watson Institute's Center For Foreign Policy Development at Brown University in 1985. Smoke committed suicide in 1995.

He was the co-founder of the Center for Peace and Common Security. An internship at Brown University's Watson Institute for International Studies has been named in his honor.

== Awards ==
- 1975 Bancroft Prize

== Works ==
- "America's 'New Thinking'", Foreign Policy, Fall, 1988
- Alexander L. George; Richard Smoke (1974). Deterrence in American Foreign Policy: Theory and Practice. Columbia University Press. ISBN 978-0-231-03838-6. "Richard Smoke."
- War: Controlling Escalation. Cambridge, MA: Harvard UP, 1978. ISBN 978-0-674-94595-1
- National Security and Nuclear Weapons. Reading, MA: Addison-Wesley, 1983.
- Beyond the Hotline: Controlling a Nuclear Crisis: A Report to the United States Arms Control and Disarmament Agency. (with William Langer Ury) Cambridge, MA: Nuclear Negotiation Project, Harvard Law School, 1984.
- Paths to Peace: Exploring the Feasibility of Sustainable Peace. (with Willis Harman) Boulder, CO: Westview Press, 1987. ISBN 978-0-8133-0492-2
- Think About Nuclear Arms Control: Understanding the Arms Race. New York: Walker, 1988. ISBN 978-0-8027-6762-2
- Mutual Security: A New Approach to Soviet-American Relations. (editor with Andrei Kotunov) New York: St. Martin's Press, 1991. ISBN 978-0-333-54673-4
- "National Security and the Nuclear Dilemma: An Introduction to the American Experience in the Cold War." McGraw Hill, 1993. ISBN 0-07-059352-3
- Richard Smoke, ed. (1996). Perceptions of Security: Public Opinion and Expert Assessments in Europe's New Democracies. Manchester, UK: Manchester University Press. ISBN 978-0-7190-4813-5.
