= Darlene Schuster =

American chemical engineer

Darlene S. Schuster is an American chemical engineer who served as the chief executive officer and executive director of the American Institute of Chemical Engineers from 2022 to 2024. She was the Clare Boothe Luce Chair and Professor of Chemical Engineering at Bucknell University.

== Career path ==
Schuster earned a B.S. (1981) and Ph.D. (1990) in chemical engineering West Virginia University. She received a M.S. in chemical engineering from the University of Pittsburgh. Her dissertation was titled, The Influence of Powder Properties on Cyclone Efficiency Predictions.

For more than 20 years, Schuster worked for the American Institute of Chemical Engineers. She also has a large variety of work experience in both chemical and bio-pharmaceutical fields.

Schuster worked as a research engineer at Chevron Oil Field Research Company in La Habra, California. She was later a senior engineer for Gulf Oil Production Research Company in Houston. She joined Bucknell University in 1989 as a visiting assistant professor. Schuster researched particle technology and data acquisition and control. She also led research on the impacts of dust and coal particles on the lungs. She later served as the Clare Boothe Luce Chair and Professor of Chemical Engineering.

Before becoming CTO at American Institute of Chemical Engineers, Schuster served as the Director of the Institute for Sustainability, Senior Director of Institute Alliances, and Director of Government Relations for American Institute of Chemical Engineers in Washington, DC.

In 2022, Schuster became the chief executive officer and executive director of the American Institute of Chemical Engineers.

On October 31st, 2024, Schuster retired from the American Institute of Chemical Engineers.

== Awards ==
Darlene earned a Science Policy Fellowship with the American Chemical Society, where she helped educate Congress and their staff on key technical policy issues.

== Publications ==
Title of Publication	Year
Benchmarking Sustainability	2007
Overcoming Nontechnical Barriers to the Implementation of Sustainable Solutions in Industry	2009
The AIChE Sustainability Index: The Factors in Detail	2009
Continuous Progress in Biopharmaceuticals	2015
Green Engineering Education in Chemical Engineering Curricula: A Quarter Century of Progress and Prospects for Future Transformations	2016
