= Association of Independent Technological Universities =

Group of private American engineering colleges

The Association of Independent Technological Universities (AITU) is a group of private American engineering colleges established in 1957. The purpose of the association is to share ideas and practices that promote innovation and entrepreneurship, promote technology-oriented careers and advance post-secondary education in engineering and science.

== Member institutions ==
The Association of Independent Technological Universities was founded by fifteen colleges. Since then, two of the original institutions have left the association (after having expanded from their original scope as technological universities) and many of the remaining thirteen have undergone name changes and/or mergers. In addition, nine more colleges have joined the association for a total of twenty-two current members.

=== Original members ===
- California Institute of Technology
- Carnegie Institute of Technology
- Case Institute of Technology
- Clarkson College of Technology
- Cooper Union
- Drexel Institute
- Illinois Institute of Technology
- Lehigh University
- Massachusetts Institute of Technology
- Polytechnic Institute of Brooklyn
- Rensselaer Polytechnic Institute
- Rice Institute
- Rose Polytechnic Institute
- Stevens Institute of Technology
- Worcester Polytechnic Institute

=== Current members ===
- California Institute of Technology
- Carnegie Mellon University
- Case Western Reserve University
- Clarkson University
- Cooper Union for the Advancement of Science and Art
- Embry-Riddle Aeronautical University
- Franklin W. Olin College of Engineering
- Florida Institute of Technology
- Illinois Institute of Technology
- Kettering University
- Lawrence Technological University
- Massachusetts Institute of Technology
- Milwaukee School of Engineering
- New York Institute of Technology
- New York University Tandon School of Engineering
- Rensselaer Polytechnic Institute
- Rochester Institute of Technology
- Rose-Hulman Institute of Technology
- Stevens Institute of Technology
- Webb Institute
- Wentworth Institute of Technology
- Worcester Polytechnic Institute
