= Matt Branam =

- Born: Matthew Branam; July 20, 1954; Terre Haute, Indiana
- Died: April 20, 2012 (aged 57); Terre Haute, Indiana
- Occupation: Former President of Rose-Hulman Institute of Technology

Matthew Branam (July 2, 1954 – April 20, 2012) was the 14th president of Rose–Hulman Institute of Technology.

== Biography ==
Everett Matthew Branam was born in Terre Haute, Indiana on 2 July 1954. He studied at Indiana State University and Taylor University before graduating from Rose-Hulman in 1979 with a bachelor's degree in civil engineering.

Branam became president after serving as interim president for two years. He was elected president of his alma mater by the college's board of trustees during a special board meeting in Indianapolis on December 4, 2009.

Before coming to Rose-Hulman, Matt Branam managed the American Red Cross as its first chief operating officer and led a turnaround in the agency's fiscal position. Before joining the American Red Cross, Branam had a 24-year career with UPS (formerly called United Parcel Service), including service as its vice president of public affairs in Washington, D.C.

He died on April 20, 2012, of a heart attack.
