= Samuel Philip Sadtler =

American chemist

Samuel Phillip Sadtler
- Born: July 18, 1847; Pine Grove, Schuylkill County, Pennsylvania, US
- Died: December 20, 1923 (aged 76); Philadelphia, Pennsylvania, US
- Education: Lehigh University, Harvard University, University of Göttingen
- Scientific career
- Fields: Chemical engineering
- Workplaces: Pennsylvania College, University of Pennsylvania, Philadelphia College of Pharmacy

Samuel Philip Sadtler, Ph.D., LL.D. (July 18, 1847 – December 20, 1923) was an American chemist, and the first president of the American Institute of Chemical Engineers in 1908.

== Life ==
Sadtler was born at Pine Grove, Schuylkill County, Pennsylvania, the son of a Lutheran minister, and educated at Pennsylvania College (class of 1867), at Lehigh University (one year), at Lawrence Scientific School (BSc 1870), and in Europe at the University of Göttingen (PhD 1871). As well as his professional activities, he was active in the Lutheran church.

Samuel Schmucker Sadtler

His son, Samuel Schmucker Sadtler, also became a chemist. In 1901 they founded Samuel P. Sadtler & Son, a chemical consulting firm in Philadelphia. It was later managed by his grandson, also named Samuel Philip Sadtler.

Sadtler died December 20, 1923, in Philadelphia.

== Career ==
Sadtler was first a professor at Pennsylvania College (1871–74) and then the University of Pennsylvania (1874–91). He then moved to the Philadelphia College of Pharmacy, where he was professor of chemistry until 1916 when he retired (and Emeritus professor afterwards). He was author of: Hand-Book of Chemical Experimentation (1877); Industrial Organic Chemistry (1901; fourth edition, 1912); and Pharmaceutical Chemistry (1895; fourth edition, 1912), with Virgil Coblentz.

In 1874, he was elected as a member of the American Philosophical Society.

In 1907 to 1908 Sadtler was part of a discussion as to the formation of a society separate from the American Chemical Society for the newly recognized profession of chemical engineering. He was initially opposed to the proliferation of societies but said he would join a chemical engineering one if it was formed. On June 22, 1908, he welcomed interested people to a meeting at the Engineers Club, Philadelphia. The forty men present became Charter Members of the American Institute of Chemical Engineers, electing Sadtler as the President, a post he held till the end of 1909. He made his presidential address at the first Annual Meeting on December 28, 1908, and also established the Transactions of the AIChE in the same year.
