= William Kaufmann =

American nuclear strategist (1918–2008)

- Born: November 10, 1918; Manhattan, New York
- Died: December 14, 2008 (aged 90); Woburn, Massachusetts
- Occupations: U.S. military advisor, professor
- Known for: Nuclear strategist

William Weed Kaufmann (November 10, 1918 – December 14, 2008) was an American nuclear strategist and adviser to seven defense secretaries, who advocated for a shift from the strategy of massive retaliation against the Soviet Union in the event of a nuclear strike.

== Early life ==
Kaufmann was born in Manhattan on November 10, 1918, to Charles and Antoinette Kaufmann. He was the fourth of six children. His father died when Kaufmann was 10 years old. He attended The Choate School in Wallingford, Connecticut, where his classmates included John F. Kennedy. He attended Yale University, earning a bachelor's degree in international studies in 1939.

== Career ==
Kaufmann served in the United States Army Air Forces during World War II. After the war, he returned to Yale and earned a master's degree in 1947 and a doctorate in 1948, both in international studies.

He was on the faculty at the Yale Institute of International Studies until 1951, when he was part of a group that left and founded Princeton University's Center of International Studies. While at Princeton in the mid-1950s, he wrote "Limited War", a, paper that argued for expansion of the conventional armies of Western Europe, instead of a reliance on nuclear weapons, to forestall an invasion by the Soviet Union. In 1956, he was hired by the RAND Corporation. He became a member of the political science faculty at the Massachusetts Institute of Technology in 1961 and also took a position that same year with the United States Department of Defense, splitting his time between both for several years. Later he split his time between the Harvard Kennedy School and the Brookings Institution.

The vision of counterforce, developed by Kaufmann and others, was that the response to an invasion of Western Europe by the Soviet Union should be a measured sequence of responses, which would start with targeted attacks of military assets that could escalate to attacks on cities if hostilities were not suspended. The hope was that an all-out nuclear war could be avoided. The counterforce proposal stood in contrast to the massive retaliation approach advocated by United States Air Force General Curtis LeMay at Strategic Air Command in which the US response to a Soviet invasion, even one without nuclear attacks, would be nuclear weapons on all major military and civilian sites in the Soviet Union and its allies, which could have resulted in hundreds of millions of deaths.

Kaufmann was hired by United States Secretary of Defense Robert McNamara after President John F. Kennedy took office, as one of McNamara's Whiz Kids. McNamara included parts of Kaufmann's counterforce proposals into the nuclear strategy that he was developing.

A 1986 article in Foreign Affairs called Kaufmann "the man who may well be the most knowledgeable individual in this country on the defense budgets of the past quarter-century."

In a report written with John D. Steinbruner in 1991 for the Brookings Institution, after the dissolution of the Soviet Union, Kaufmann opined that the US could meet its post-Cold War defense obligations after cutting military spending by a third. The report noted that "the future ability of the United States to maintain the conditions of its security will depend as much on its moral authority, diplomatic skills and economic assets as on its military capabilities."

Kaufmann died at 90 years of age on December 14, 2008, in Woburn, Massachusetts, of complications from Alzheimer's disease.

== Doctoral students ==
- Joshua M. Epstein
- E. Randolph Jayne II
- Catherine McArdle Kelleher
- Dana G. Mead
- John J. Midgley
- Richard Smoke
- David N. Schwartz
