= American Institute of Chemical Engineers =

Professional organization for chemical engineers

AIChE
- Predecessor: American Society of Mechanical Engineers
- Formation: 1908
- Type: Nonprofit
- Headquarters: New York, NY
- Region served: Worldwide
- Members: >60,000 in over 110 countries
- Official language: English
- CEO: Darlene Schuster
- President: Anne O'Neal
- Affiliations: ASME
- Revenue: $53.5 m USD (2022)
- Website: www.aiche.org

The American Institute of Chemical Engineers (AIChE) is a professional organization for chemical engineers. AIChE was established in 1908 to distinguish chemical engineers as professionals independent of chemists and mechanical engineers.

By 2024, AIChE had over 60,000 members from over 110 countries (sources vary). There are over 350 active student chapters at universities worldwide. Student chapters aim to provide networking opportunities in academia and industry as well as increase student involvement locally and nationally.

== History of formation ==
This section consists of excerpts from a historical pamphlet written for the Silver Anniversary of the AICHE in 1932.

In 1905, The Chemical Engineer rounded out its first year of publication with an editorial by its founder and prominent engineer, Richard K. Meade, that propounded the question: "Why not the American Society of Chemical Engineers?" He went on to say: "The profession is now a recognized one and there are probably at least five hundred chemical engineers in this country".

The mechanical, civil, electrical, and mining engineers in the United States each had already established a national society, so Meade's editorial was quite pertinent. But it took time for the idea to take root and Meade kept promoting it for the next two years. Finally, in 1907, he issued a call for a preliminary meeting to be held in Atlantic City in June 1907. Some early leaders of the profession, Charles F. McKenna, William H. Walker, William Miller Booth, Samuel P. Sadtler, and Thorn Smith along with about a dozen others answered Meade's call and met in Atlantic City on June 21, 1907. The meeting concluded with the formation of an organizing committee of six members: Charles F. McKenna (chairman), Richard K. Meade, William M. Booth, J.C. Olsen, William H. Walker, and Arthur D. Little.

The organizing committee sent a letter in September 1908 to 600 men in the chemical profession in the United States and Canada asking for their opinions about forming a chemical engineering society. Two hundred replies were received and 70-80% were favorable. Many of the others believed the existing societies (especially the American Chemical Society) were sufficient and they did not favor forming a new society.

The organizing committee decided to hold a larger, open meeting at the Hotel Belmont in New York City at which those opposed to forming the new society could present their arguments and opinions. Accordingly, they invited fifty men prominent in the chemical profession (including men who opposed the forming of a new society) to meet on January 18, 1908. Twenty-one men attended the meeting and fourteen others expressed their views in letters. After much discussion, the meeting ended without reaching a definitive decision. However, it was agreed to have a mail vote (on whether or not to form a chemical engineering society) after a complete stenographic report of the meeting was printed and sent to the fifty men who had been invited to the meeting.

The mail vote resulted in 36 replies of which 22 were in the affirmative, 6 were negative, and 8 were neutral. Based on those voting results, the organizing committee of six called for a full-fledged organizational meeting to be held in Philadelphia on June 22, 1908. Meanwhile, the committee of six drafted a proposed constitution to be presented at that meeting. That meeting resulted in the official formation of the American Institute of Chemical Engineers, the adoption of a constitution, and the election of Samuel P. Sadtler as the first president of the Institute. There were 40 charter members:

- Acheson, E.G.
- Adamson, G.P.
- Allen, L.E.
- Alexander, J.
- Barton, G.E.
- Bassett, W.H.
- Bement, A.
- Booth, W.M.
- Brown, H. F.
- Camp, J.M.
- Catlin, C.A.
- Dannerth, F.
- Dow, Allan W.
- Frerich, F.W.
- Grosvenor, W.M.
- Gudeman, E.
- Haanel, E.
- Heath, G. M.
- Hollick, H.
- Horn, D.W.
- Hunicke, H.A.
- Ingalls, W.R.
- Kaufman, H.M.
- Langmuir, A.C.
- Mason, W.P.
- McKenna, C.F.
- Meade, R.K.
- Miller, A.L.
- Olney, Lewis A.
- Olsen, J.C.
- Reese, C.L.
- Renaud, H.S.
- Reuter, Ludwig
- Robertson, A.
- Sadtler, S.P.
- Smith, Thorn
- Trautwein, A.P.
- Wesson, D.
- Whitfield, J.E.
- Weichmann, F.G.

== Governance and structure ==
The AIChE is governed by a board of directors.

As of 2026 the AIChE has three operating councils that report to the board:

- Career and Education Operating Council (CEOC)
- Chemical Engineering Technology Operating Council (CTOC), responsible for knowledge advancement and disseminating that knowledge
- Societal Impact Operating Council (SIOC)

=== Technical divisions and forums ===
Divisions and forums provide technical information, programming for AIChE's technical meetings, and awards and recognition to outstanding chemical engineers in their areas of expertise. They also provide opportunities for affiliation with top engineers in the general disciplines as well as in emerging fields like biotechnology and sustainability.

This is a list of the divisions and forums:

- Catalysis and Reaction Engineering Division (CRE)
- Computational Molecular Science & Engineering Forum (CoMSEF)
- Computing & Systems Technology Division (CAST)
- Education Division (EDU)
- Environmental Division (ENV)
- Food, Pharmaceutical & Bioengineering Division (FP&BE)
- Forest Products Division (FP)
- Fuels & Petrochemicals Division (F&P)
- Materials Engineering & Sciences Division (MESD)
- Nanoscale Science Engineering Forum (NSEF)
- North American Mixing Forum (NAMF)
- Nuclear Engineering Division (NE)
- Particle Technology Forum (PTF)
- Process Development Division (PD)
- Process Safety Division (PSD)
- Separations Division (SEP)
- Sustainable Engineering Forum (SEF)
- Transport and Energy Processes Division (TEP)

== Membership grades ==
The AIChE has four grades of membership as listed below (ranging from the highest grade to the lowest grade):

- Fellow
- Senior Member
- Member
- Student member

The prerequisite qualifications for election to any of the membership grades are available in the AIChE Bylaws.

== Joint initiatives with industry, academia, and others ==
As new technology is developed, there is a need for experts to collaborate to achieve common goals. AIChE plays a major role through joint initiatives with industry, academia, and others.

- Center for Chemical Process Safety (CCPS): CCPS is a non-profit, corporate membership organization within AIChE that addresses process safety within the chemical, pharmaceutical, and petroleum industries. It is a technological alliance of manufacturers, government agencies, consultants, academia and insurers dedicated to improving industrial process safety. CCPS has developed over 100 publications relevant to process safety.
- Design Institute for Emergency Relief Systems (DIERS): DIERS was formed in 1976 by a group of 29 companies that developed methods for the design of emergency relief systems to handle runaway reactions. Currently, 232 companies participate in the DIERS Users Group to cooperatively implement, maintain, and improve the DIERS methodology for the design of emergency relief systems including reactive systems.
- Design Institute for Physical Properties (DIPPR): DIPPR collects, correlates, and critically evaluates thermophysical and environmental property data. If needed property values are not found in the literature, they may be measured in DIPPR projects and subsequently added to the DIPPR databases. DIPPR disseminates its information in publications, computer programs, and databases on diskettes and online.
- Safety and Chemical Engineering Education Program (SACHE) : The SAChE program, initiated in 1992, is an initiative between the CCPS and engineering universities to provide teaching materials about process safety for educating undergraduate and graduate students studying chemical and biochemical engineering. The materials can also be used for training in industrial settings. The SAChE leadership committee is composed of representatives from academia and industry as well as AIChE staff.
- Society for Biological Engineering (SBE) : The SBE, an AIChE Technological Community, is a global organization of leading engineers and scientists dedicated to advancing the integration of biology with engineering. SBE is dedicated to promoting the integration of biology with engineering and realizing its benefits through bioprocessing, biomedical, and biomolecular applications.
- Institute for Sustainability (IFS): The mission of IFS is to assist professionals, academes, industries, and governmental entities contributing to the advancement of sustainability and sustainable development. The primary goal of the IFS is to promote the societal, economic, and environmental benefits of sustainable and green engineering.

== Publications ==
- Chemical Engineering Progress: Monthly magazine providing technical and professional information.
- AIChE Journal: Peer-reviewed monthly journal covering groundbreaking research in chemical engineering and related fields.
- Process Safety Progress: Quarterly publication covering process safety issues.
- Environmental Progress: Quarterly publication covering environmental subjects and governmental environmental regulations.
- Biotechnology Progress: Peer-reviewed journal published every two months and covering peer-reviewed research reports and reviews in the bioprocessing, biomedical, and biomolecular fields.

== See also ==
- Chemical engineer
- Chemical engineering
- History of chemical engineering
- List of chemical engineers
- List of chemical engineering societies
- Process engineering
- Process design (chemical engineering)
- Chem-E-Car
