= Dana G. Mead =

American businessman and corporate director

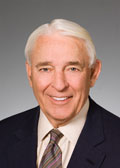

Chair of Massachusetts Institute of Technology
- In office 2003–2010

Chair of Tenneco
- In office 1992–2000

Personal details
- Born: Dana George Mead; 22 February 1936 Cresco, Iowa, U.S.
- Died: 31 October 2018 (aged 82) Boston, Massachusetts, U.S.
- Education: Massachusetts Institute of Technology
- Occupation: Businessman, political scientists

Dana George Mead (February 22, 1936 – October 31, 2018) was an American businessman and corporate director. Mead was chairman emeritus of the Massachusetts Institute of Technology Foundation's board of trustees, where he served as chairman from 2003 through 2010.

== Early life ==
Mead, born in Cresco, Iowa, graduated from the United States Military Academy with a B.S. degree in 1957 and received his Ph.D. in political science from the Massachusetts Institute of Technology in 1967. His doctoral thesis was entitled United States peacetime strategic planning, 1920-1941: the color plans to the victory program and his advisor was William W. Kaufmann. While pursuing his doctorate, he taught in the Social Sciences Department at West Point from 1966 to 1969. Mead served in the U.S. Army line armor and airborne units in West Germany and Vietnam between 1957 and 1978, retiring as a colonel. He earned the Legion of Merit, two Bronze Star Medals, four Air Medals and the Meritorious Service Medal.

== Career ==
From 1992 until 2000 Mead was president, chairman and CEO of Tenneco, Inc., a large conglomerate, operating in 50 countries, in oil and gas pipelines, farm and construction equipment, shipbuilding, auto parts, industrial and consumer packaging, chemicals and minerals. Tenneco was named one of the 100 Best Managed Companies in the World four times during his tenure. At Tenneco he was elected chairman of both the Business Roundtable (1998–1999) and the National Association of Manufacturers (1994–1995).

Before Tenneco, Mead was executive vice president and a member of the board at International Paper. Prior to his work at International Paper, Mead was professor and deputy head of the Social Sciences Department at West Point; while there he served on the Pentagon teams writing the final chapters of the Pentagon Papers and Westmoreland's Report on the War in Vietnam.

Between his time in the military and his business career, Mead spent significant time in the White House. Mead was a White House Fellow between 1970 and 1971. Following this, Mead served as deputy director of the White House Domestic Council focusing on desegregation, community development, revenue sharing, and transportation from 1972 to 1974. As White House liaison to the District of Columbia, Mead drafted the first Home Rule Bill for the District.

Mead was a co-founder of the French-American Business Council, chaired the Trans Atlantic Business Dialogue and the Royal Shakespeare Company USA board, and sat on the parent London board. He was also a member of the boards of directors for Cummins (1993–1996), Zurich Financial Services (1997–2006), Pactiv (1998–2000), the Boys and Girls Clubs of America, Textron, Center for Creative Leadership, and Pfizer. Mead was a member of the American Academy of Arts and Sciences, the Council on Foreign Relations, the advisory board of the George C. Marshall Foundation, and the Pardee RAND Graduate School.

== Personal life ==
Mead co-authored High Standards, Hard Choices: A CEO's Journey of Courage, Risk and Change, published in 2000.

Mead died in Boston on October 31, 2018 at the age of 82.
