= Edith Pfau =

American painter

- Pfau in 1977
- Born: Alberta Henrietta Pfau; July 15, 1915; Jasper, Indiana
- Died: December 14, 2001 (aged 86); Saint Mary-of-the-Woods, Indiana
- Education: Saint Mary-of-the-Woods College, Indiana State University, Ball State University, Chicago Art Institute, Notre Dame University, The Catholic University of America
- Known for: Painting, sculpting, art education

Edith Henrietta Pfau (July 15, 1915 – December 14, 2001) was an American painter, sculptor, and art educator known for her Catholic art and commissions.

== Early life and education ==
Born on July 15, 1915, in Jasper, Indiana, Pfau began drawing at a very early age.

Pfau entered the Sisters of Providence of Saint Mary-of-the-Woods in 1933 at the age of 18, taking the religious name Sister Edith. Her main ministry as a Sister was teaching art and English in Indiana, Illinois, Washington, D.C., California, and Taiwan. Pfau's education ministry included eleven years teaching at Saint Mary-of-the-Woods College, eleven years at Immaculata Junior College in Washington, D.C., and ten years at Providence University in Shalu, Taichung, and Taiwan.

Pfau earned a bachelor's degree in English and art from Saint Mary-of-the-Woods College in 1941. Beginning in 1944 she attended summer sessions at the Art Institute of Chicago with the intent of pursuing a master's degree, but was unable to complete the program due to her teaching responsibilities. In 1951 she earned her Master's from Indiana State University, and a doctorate in education followed from Ball State University in 1971. As an academic, she focused on the subject of art in secondary Catholic education. Pfau also completed numerous summer sessions from the University of Notre Dame and The Catholic University of America.

== Career ==
Mater Salvatoris

Pfau became known for religious paintings, which often used intersections of straight and curved lines and overlapping shapes. Her oil painting "Mater Salvatoris" (c. 1958) is an example of this technique. Numerous churches commissioned works from her including a set of stations of the cross for Our Lady Providence church in Brownstown, Indiana, another set for St. Francis Xavier Church (Wilmette, Illinois), and Christ the Pantokrator for St. Cecilia Church in Tustin, California. Several of her screen print card designs were printed and produced by Community Art Chicago in the 1950s.

Pfau's work was exhibited at the Metropolitan Museum of Art in 1947 in an exhibit of Sisters' Manuscripts. Throughout her career, Pfau won numerous awards for her work including first prize in oils from the Indiana College Art Exhibit (1935), first prize in painting at the Wabash Valley Art Exhibition held at Swope Art Museum (1946), several awards and an honorable mention from the national Art for Religion exhibits (1959 and 1969). She earned a solo show of polymer painting and serigraphs during her doctorate studies at Ball State University in 1969.
