= John B. Peddle =

American mechanical engineer

John Bailey Peddle
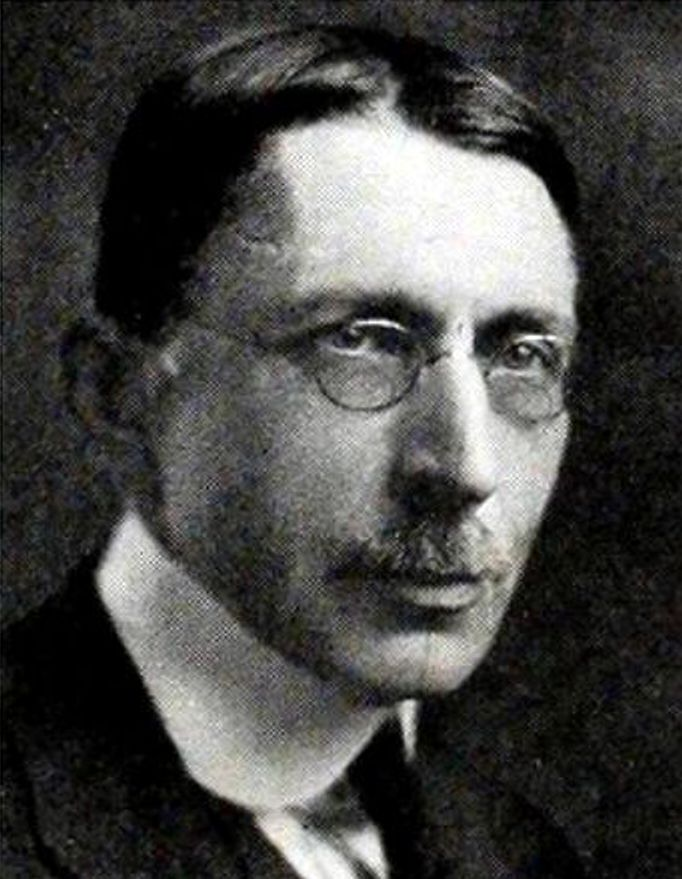
- Self Portrait, 1909
- Born: February 27, 1868; Terre Haute, Indiana
- Died: April 6, 1933 (aged 65); Terre Haute, Indiana
- Education: Rose Rose Polytechnic Institute
- Occupations: Engineer, professor, author
- Employer: Rose Rose Polytechnic Institute
- Known for: Construction of Graphical Charts, 1910

John Bailey Peddle (Terre Haute, Indiana, February 27, 1868 – idem, April 6, 1933) was an American mechanical engineer, Professor of Machine Design at the Rose Polytechnic Institute and author, known for his seminal work Construction of Graphical Charts, 1910.

== Life and work ==
Peddle was the son of Charles R. and Mary Elizabeth Ball Peddle. He graduated at the Rose Polytechnic Institute in 1888, and after six years in business joined the faculty in 1894 as an instructor in machine design. From 1897 until 1933 he was a Professor of Machine Design at the Rose Polytechnic Institute.

In 1910 Peddle published the Construction of Graphical Charts, which was the first book in the English language treating the art of graphical representation. The work was written from a mathematical point of view, and required some engineering training. In 1914, Willard C. Brinton published a similar work for the general audience with no mathematics, entitled Graphic Methods for Presenting Facts.

Peddle was a member of the American Society of Mechanical Engineers and the Indiana Academy of Science.

Peddle was also an amateur photographer, who published some of his work and articles in The Photographic Times magazine, including a self-portrait.

=== Family ===
Peddle's younger sister was the sculptor Caroline Peddle Ball (1869–1938). Peddle married Alice O. Peddle, and they had two children: Juliet Peddle (1899–1979), a modernist architect, and one other child.

== Publications ==
- The Construction of Graphical Charts, New York, McGraw-Hill, 1910.

Article's, a selection

- "Alinement Diagram in the Graphical Solution of Equations," By John B Peddle, 1905.
- "The Construction of Graphical Charts," in: American Machinist, May 30, 1908.
- "Color Photography," in: Proceedings of the American Institute of Electrical Engineers. 1915.
- "Carl Leo Mees," in: Science. September 2, 1932. Vol 76, Issue 1966. pp. 206–207
