= Gerald Jakubowski =

Gerald S. Jakubowski, P.E., was the Provost at the California Maritime Academy. Prior to this he was the president of Rose-Hulman Institute of Technology. He became the 13th President of Rose-Hulman on 1 July 2006, and was inaugurated on 27 April 2007. On 23 February 2009, he announced his resignation from this position, effective 30 June 2009. From 2004 to 2006, he was Vice President of Arizona State University and Provost of its Polytechnic campus; from 1990 to 2004, he was the Dean of the College of Science and Engineering at Loyola Marymount University. He is married to Lynn Jakubowski. Gerald has a son and a daughter from his previous marriage. Jerry is an electrical engineering graduate of Villanova University and currently works for STV Inc., in Philadelphia, PA as a senior traction power specialist for the railroad. Jamie is an Arizona State University graduate and high school mathematics teacher in Fountain Valley, CA.

Jakubowski served briefly in the U.S. Army Reserve, then earned his bachelor's and master's degrees in mechanical engineering and his Ph.D. in engineering science at the University of Toledo, in 1974, 1976, and 1978, respectively. He was awarded Distinguished Alumni status by the school in 2003. His areas of expertise include thermodynamics, fluid mechanics, heat transfer, and energy. He is also a Fellow in the Institute for the Advancement of Engineering, in the American Society for Engineering Education (where he received the Dow Outstanding Young Faculty Award,) in the American Society of Mechanical Engineers, and has served on the Board of Directors and Foundation Board of Trustees for the Society of Automotive Engineers, who awarded him the Ralph R. Teetor Educational Award and the Excellence in Engineering Education Award. He has been involved in the Triangle Fraternity since he was at the University of Toledo; in 1996 he received their highest award, the Triangle Service Key, and was a past National President.
