= Randy Jayne =

United States Air Force general

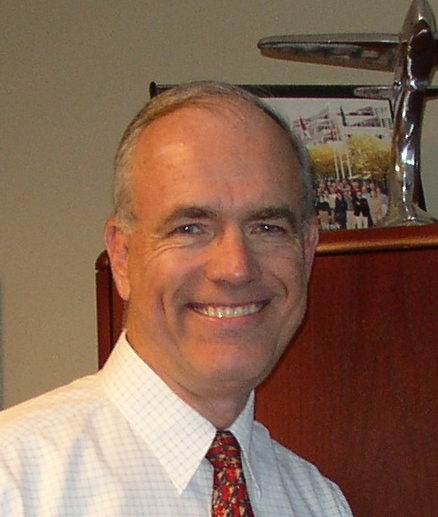
- Born: Edward Randolph Jayne II; September 25, 1944 (age 82); Kirksville, Missouri, U.S.
- Education: United States Air Force Academy (BS); Massachusetts Institute of Technology (PhD)
- Military career
- Branch: United States Air Force; Air National Guard
- Service years: 1962 – 2000
- Rank: Major General

Edward Randolph "Randy" Jayne II (born 1944) is an American retired government official, business executive, military officer, and combat pilot. During his career, he worked in the defense industry and served in the White House Office under three successive United States presidents. Prior to his business career, Jayne spent over ten years on active duty in the United States Air Force, including two tours as a fighter pilot in Southeast Asia. Jayne served in the Air National Guard and retiring after 34 years of service as a major general. From 2015 to 2017, he was chairman of the board of the US Air Force Academy Foundation, the fundraising organization for that institution. In 2019, Jayne was named an Outstanding Graduate of the United States Air Force Academy, an honor bestowed as of that time on 41 alumni over the more than sixty years of the Academy's existence.

== Early life and education ==
Jayne was born on September 24, 1944, in Kirksville, Missouri. His father was a lawyer and World War II naval officer combat veteran, and his mother was a schoolteacher and later an elected school board member and president in Kirksville. He is the eldest of three brothers.

Randy Jayne graduated from Kirksville High School in May 1962 and entered the United States Air Force Academy in June of that year. Jayne graduated from the Air Force Academy with a Bachelor of Science degree in international relations in 1966, and entered the air force as a second lieutenant. He attended the Massachusetts Institute of Technology and completed his PhD in political science and national security affairs in 1969. His doctoral thesis, published by the Center for International Studies and supervised by William W. Kaufmann, is titled "The ABM Debate: Strategic Defense and National Security," after he completed his PhD, he served a series of operational flying and Washington D.C., special staff tours.

== Military career ==
During Jayne’s over ten years as an active air officer, he had a number of operational flying assignments, and special staff duty in the White House. After completing Air Force Pilot Training as a distinguished graduate (1969–1970), he served as a special operations pilot flying the A-1E Skyraider in South-East Asia at Nakhon Phanom Royal Thai Air Force Base (1971–1972). In 1974, he completed upgrade training in the F-4 Phantom, and returned to Southeast Asia for a second fighter assignment, this time at Korat RTAFB. Jayne’s combat decorations include two Silver Stars, five Distinguished Flying Crosses and eight Air Medals. Other key military assignments during this time included two tours in the Executive Office of the President of the United States and service as a USAF jet instructor pilot at Moody Air Force Base. In the White House, Jayne served first as a White House Fellow in 1973–1974 during the Nixon Administration, and later, in 1976 and 1977, as a staff member of the National Security Council during the Ford Administration, working for and as a staff member of the United States National Security Council working for General Brent Scowcroft, and serving alongside other young professional staffers such as Robert Gates, Stephen Hadley and Robert Kimmitt.

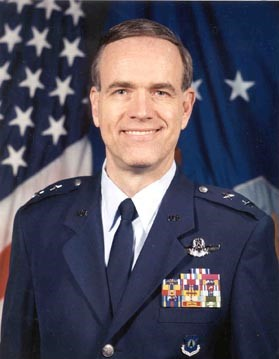
Jayne in his Air Force uniform

In 1977, Jayne was appointed by President Jimmy Carter as associate director in the Office of Management and Budget. At the same time, he transferred from the active air force to the Air National Guard (ANG), where he would serve for over twenty-three additional years as an officer, pilot, commander, and senior staff officer. Joining the District of Columbia ANG in 1977, he flew the F-105 Thunderchief and served as the 121st Fighter Squadron operations officer. Moving to the Missouri ANG in 1980, he again checked out in the F-4 Phantom, the same fighter he had flown in one of the Southeast Asia tours. Jayne was also a combat-ready pilot in the 131st Fighter Wing in St. Louis.

From 1993 to 1995, Jayne served as the senior “traditional Guardsman” officer in the 1,200-person fighter unit. As vice wing commander, Colonel Jayne led the inspection preparation prior to the 1995 award of the Air Force’s highest operational readiness inspection rating, that of “Outstanding,” to the 131st Wing. He also played key roles in St Louis and the Pentagon in the National Guard’s massive civil response to the Midwestern Floods of 1993–1994 and the nationwide call-up and deployment of ANG forces to Desert Shield/Desert Storm. In November 1995, Jayne was selected to be the Air National Guard Assistant to the Commander of Air Force Space Command in Colorado Springs. He served this leadership role for five years, serving four AFSC commanders, before his retirement in 2000 as a major general with over thirty-four years of total commissioned service.

== Civilian career ==
Prior to joining Heidrick & Struggles, Jayne occupied leadership positions in three public companies, including two Fortune 100 aerospace and defense firms. At General Dynamics (GD), he served at the director and vice president levels in the company’s corporate headquarters. In 1987, he was recruited to McDonnell Douglas Corporation, where he served in a number of executive assignments. At Insituform Mid-America he served as president and chief operating officer.

=== National security and international affairs ===
In 1977, Jayne left active military service to accept appointment by President Jimmy Carter as the associate director for national security and international affairs in the Office of Management and Budget (OMB) in the Executive Office of the President. In this role, he was responsible for the budget for the United States Department of Defense, United States Department of State, and the intelligence community (IC). During this three-year assignment, Jayne participated in a number of major national security decisions, including full-scale development and initial production for the F-16, F-18, F-117 Stealth Fighter, AWACS, the Tomahawk Cruise Missile, M1A1 Abrams tank, and NASA’s Space Shuttle.

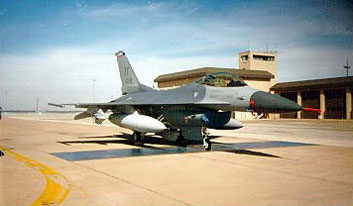

=== Aerospace industry ===
In 1980, Jayne left government service to join the aerospace industry, hired by General Dynamics (GD) as director of aerospace planning, and two years later becoming vice president of strategic planning. As a key member of the GD executive team, he was involved in the acquisitions of Cessna Aircraft and Chrysler Defense, and the initiation of major programs such as the F-16C, the Advanced Cruise Missile, Tomahawk, the M1A2 Abrams tank, and the SSN-21 attack submarine. After seven years at GD, Jayne was recruited to what was at the time the second largest defense contractor behind GD, McDonnell Douglas Corporation (MDC). He joined as vice president of program development for the MDC Astronautics Company. In 1989 he moved to McDonnell Aircraft Company as the vice president and general manager of the F-15 Eagle program, leading that international fighter program as it built new aircraft for the US, Saudis, and Israelis, supported offshore assembly in Japan, and supported US, Saudi and Israeli Eagles in operation all around the world. By this time, MDC has surpassed GD as the nation’s largest defense contractor.

In 1990, Jayne became president of McDonnell Douglas Missile Systems Company. There, he inherited five major firm fixed-price development programs and a near-term loss potential of over $200 million. Three years later, these contracts had all been restructured or completed, and Missile Systems was a highly profitable operation. In 1993, Jayne was recruited to Insituform Mid-America (IMA) as president and chief operating officer. The late 1994 merger of IMA and Instituform Technologies led Jayne to his present position at Heidrick & Struggles.

== Current career ==
During the time Jayne has been at Heidrick & Struggles, he has successfully placed over one hundred presidents and chief executive officers. He has conducted searches for CEOs, presidents, other senior executives, and board members for a wide variety of public, private and not-for-profit organizations, and writing articles for leadership organizations. At Heidrick & Struggles, he is the senior member of the firm’s global Aerospace, Defense & Aviation Practice and is also a member of the CEO & Board Practice and the Higher Education Practice. His search practice includes corporate clients in both aerospace and technology. In addition, he has recruited US National Laboratory CEO’s, university presidents, and deans of engineering.

From 2001 to August 2013, Jayne served on the corporate board of directors of CAE Inc., the world leader in aircraft flight simulators, airline pilot training, and modeling and simulation. At CAE, he served on the corporate governance committee. From 2002 through 2019, Jayne served as a member of the board of trustees of the Institute for Defense Analyses (IDA) in Alexandria, Virginia, the independent research and analysis organization chartered by the Office of the Secretary Defense (OSD) over fifty years ago. IDA conducts major studies and analysis for the Office of the Secretary of Defense, the National Security Agency, and the Office of Science and Technology Policy. He chaired the IDA Nominating and Governance Committee for over seven years. Jayne is a member, and from November 2015 to July 2017, the chairman of the Air Force Academy Foundation (formerly named the USAFA Endowment) Founding board of directors and of the board of trustees of the Falcon Foundation at the Air Force Academy.

Jayne has been a guest lecturer and seminar participant at the three service academies, the National Defense University, and the three services’ war colleges and intermediate service schools. He is a past member of the board of directors of the Smithsonian National Air & Space Museum, and the board of directors of the Northern Virginia Technology Council (NVTC). In 2009, Jayne was elected to the board of directors of the White House Fellows Association and Foundation, and served a six-year term, leaving in November 2015. in Washington, DC.

He continues to be an active participant in a variety of defense and national security affairs activities. He was a member of the Director of Central Intelligence’s National Security Advisory Panel at the Central Intelligence Agency from 1995 to its dissolution in 2005, serving three DCI’s, James Woolsey, John Deutch, and George Tenet. In 1995, Jayne served as a senior consultant and advisor to Dr. John P. White and the Presidential Commission on Roles and Missions in the Armed Forces, taking a leadership role on a number of key issues put forth by that group. In 1996, he was appointed by President Bill Clinton to the five-person Advisory Board on Arms Proliferation Policy Jayne published a historical piece on the A-1 Skyraider combat experience in Southeast Asia, in the Air & Space Power Journal at Air University at Maxwell AFB.

== Personal life ==
Randy Jayne and his wife Nancy K Jayne reside in Webster Groves, Missouri, and Sanibel, Florida. They have two adult children, Kathryn and Matthew, and two grandchildren.

== Achievements/accomplishments ==
Silver Star with one oak leaf cluster
Defense Superior Service Medal
Legion of Merit
Distinguished Flying Cross with Four Oak Leaf Clusters
Meritorious Service Medal
Air Medal with seven oak leaf clusters
Air Force Commendation Medal
Air Force Outstanding Unit Award with one device
Combat Readiness Medal with four oak leaf clusters
National Defense Service Medal
Vietnam Service Medal with three Bronze Service Stars
Air Force Overseas Short Tour Ribbon with one oak leaf cluster
Air Force Longevity Service Award Ribbon with seven oak leaf clusters
Armed Forces Reserve Ribbon with one device
Air Force Training Ribbon
Republic of Vietnam Cross of Gallantry with Palm
Republic of Vietnam Campaign Medal
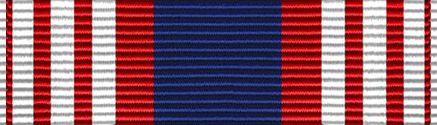
Missouri National Guard Commendation Ribbon
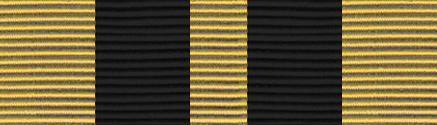
Missouri National Guard Long Service Medal

=== Effective dates of promotion ===
Insignia	Rank	Component	Date
	Second lieutenant	US Air Force	June 8, 1966
	First lieutenant	US Air Force	June 8, 1969
	Captain	US Air Force	June 8, 1973
	Major	US Air Force	April 26, 1977
	Lieutenant colonel	Air National Guard	April 26, 1984
	Colonel	Air National Guard	December 18, 1992
	Brigadier general	Air National Guard	August 2, 1996
	Major general	Air National Guard	March 2, 1998
