= Juliet Peddle =

American architect

- Born: June 7, 1899; Terre Haute, Indiana, U.S.A.
- Died: 1979 (aged 79–80)
- Education: University of Michigan
- Occupation: Architect

Juliet A. Peddle (1899–1979) was an American modernist architect who was the first woman architect licensed by the state of Indiana and a cofounder of the Women's Architectural Club of Chicago.

== Early life and education ==
Peddle was born on June 7, 1899, in Terre Haute, Indiana, to John B. and Alice O. Peddle. She was educated at the King Classical School, and she learned drawing from her father, who taught machine design at Rose Polytechnic Institute. She went on to earn a degree in architecture from the University of Michigan in 1920, the second woman to do so, following her friend Bertha Yerex Whitman. She then moved to Chicago, where she worked briefly for the architectural firm of Perkins, Fellows, and Hamilton. One of her coworkers there was Whitman, with whom she would go on to cofound (with seven other women) the Women's Architectural Club of Chicago. The club was active into the 1940s, when it merged with the American Institute of Architecture. Peddle was the editor of the club's occasional publication, The Architrave. The group exhibited work around Chicago, including at the first Woman's World's Fair in Chicago in 1925.

After leaving Perkins, Fellows, and Hamilton, Peddle went on to study architecture in Europe.

== Architectural career ==
In 1935, Peddle moved back to Terre Haute, where in 1939 she became the first female architect licensed by the state of Indiana. (There had been a couple of other women who were practicing architects in Indiana before Peddle, such as Grace Crosby, but Indiana only started licensing architects in 1929.) She opened her own architectural practice in Terre Haute, where she designed buildings for more than three decades. In addition to residences, she designed a Social Security building, the Medicenter building, and the Crawford School in and around Terre Haute.

As she worked in Chicago after her graduation, Peddle was an architectural draftsman at E. H. Clark Inc.

Peddle became known for a strongly modernist style. Her Topping House (1960), for example, had many glass features, including bubble skylights, glass walls, and textured glass room dividers. At the same time, Peddle greatly appreciated older American styles of building and was dismayed at how many such buildings were being demolished. She spent several decades photographing the buildings and streets of Terre Haute, creating a valuable historical archive that is now housed at the Vigo County Historical Society in Indiana. Her interest in local history found another outlet in a collection of 60 detailed drawings of Terre Haute buildings from before the Civil War that she made for the historical society and that were based on careful study of old photographs, drawings, descriptions, technical specifications, and interviews with local residents. She decided to publish this series in a local paper, the Terre Haute Sunday Tribune Star, in 1941–42 as a way of broadening local knowledge about Terre Haute's architectural heritage.

Peddle provided the illustrations for a 1939 book about Indiana settlers, The Story of a Hoosier Immigration, that was based on the recollections of the lives of Peddle's great-great-grandparents.

== Notable projects and designs ==
- First Congregational Church
- A updated branch of Vigo County Public Library
- Topping House on Ohio Boulevard
- Crawford School in Farrington's Grove Historic District

== Legacy ==
Peddle died in 1979. Ball State University and Rose-Hulman Institute of Technology (Logan Library) hold collections of her architectural drawings, sketches, and prints from the years 1928–1967. Her prints, many of which were created as annual Christmas cards, feature the bold black lines and high contrast typical of woodcuts and linocuts. Another collection of drawings is held by the Rose-Hulman Institute of Technology (formerly the Rose Polytechnic Institute) in Terre Haute.

Since 1999, the Indiana Architecture Foundation has given an annual architectural scholarship in her honor, the Juliet Peddle Award, that recognizes a student for "strong willingness to pioneer, being successful in breaking new ground, strong devotion and commitment to architecture, display of professionalism and perseverance, and having a kind spirit".
