= Sam Hulbert =

American academic administrator (1936–2016)

Samuel Foster Hulbert (April 12, 1936 – January 29, 2016) was an American scientist working in Ceramics Science and Biomaterials. He carried out biomaterial work in artificial knees, hips, and dental prostheses. He served as president of Rose-Hulman Institute of Technology for 28 years. He was born at Adams Center, New York.

== Early life ==
Hulbert grew up in Adams Center New York, where he spent most of his time in extracurricular activities and helping out on his family's milk delivery business. Hulbert described helping the milk delivery business as difficult and busy. In part due to his enjoyment of being active and as an effort to cope, he engaged in a wide variety of school activities including: baseball, football, and basketball and believed that it increased his knowledge about how to interact with others and his confidence. Hulbert's passion for sports even led him to try out for the Philadelphia Phillies; the try out ended with his receiving a concussion as result of a lack of protection and a hit from a professional pitcher. While he was grateful for his family, he felt driven to set his own course away from the strenuous life style he grew up with and thus wanted to pursue higher education. He was influenced to go to Alfred University by his chemistry teacher, Lyle Cady, who showed him the campus and helped convince his parents to let him go there.

== Education ==
Hulbert earned a B.S. in Ceramic Engineering in 1958 and a Ph.D. in Ceramic Science in 1964 both from Alfred University

== Career ==
Hulbert joined the faculty of Clemson University in 1964, eventually becoming the Associate Dean for Engineering Research and Interdisciplinary Studies in 1970. During his time at Clemson, he along with C. Clifford Fain and Michael J. Eitel, was given a grant by the Environmental Protection Agency to investigate the viability of water disposable/biodegradable glass and conducted a multiple year study that culminated in a report made to the EPA in 1971. 1973 he joined Tulane University as the Dean of Engineering. While at Tulane, Hulbert helped create their biomedical engineering program.

Hulbert was President of Rose-Hulman, situated in Terre Haute, Indiana, from 1976 to 2004, also teaching bioengineering classes. During this period, student enrollment doubled, $90 million in new buildings were constructed, the endowment increased to $180 million, and the school became co-educational. A campaign raised $250 million. Rose-Hulman was ranked at the top of the U.S. News & World Report rankings of undergraduate engineering programs whose highest degree is a Bachelor's or Master's.

He also became President of the Association of Independent Technological Universities, Chairman of the Second World Congress on Biomaterials, and Chairman of the 3rd International Symposium on Ceramics in Medicine, and founded the Society for Biomaterials.

== Awards ==
- 1973 Clemson Special Award
- 1996 Indiana Health Industry Forum Lifetime Achievement Award
- 1998 Ernst & Young Supporter of Entrepreneurship Award
- 1998 C. Williams Award from the Society of Biomaterials
- 1999 George Winters Award from the European Society for Biomaterials
- 2001 Founders Award from the Society for Biomaterials

Hulbert was a member of the Indiana Academy, the International Academy of Ceramics, a fellow of the American Institute for Medical and Biological Engineering, and a fellow of biomaterials science and engineering from the World Biomaterials Congress.

== Family ==
Hulbert married Joy E. Husband 1960; they have three children: Greg (b. 1961); Samantha (b. 1962); Jeff (b. 1968) and ten grandchildren.
