= Caroline Peddle Ball =

American sculptor (1869–1938)

- Born: Caroline Peddle; November 11, 1869; Terre Haute, Indiana, US
- Died: October 1, 1938 (aged 68); Harwinton, Connecticut, US
- Education: Pennsylvania Academy of the Fine Arts, Art Students League of New York
- Known for: Sculpture
- Spouse: Bertrand E. Ball (m. 1902) ending in divorce

Caroline Peddle Ball (November 11, 1869 – October 1, 1938) was an American sculptor. She exhibited at both the 1893 Chicago Exposition and the 1900 Paris Exhibition.

== Biography ==
Caroline Peddle was born in Terre Haute, Indiana on November 11, 1869. She studied art at the Rose Polytechnic Institute, and the Pennsylvania Academy of the Fine Arts. She continued her education at the Art Students League of New York, under Augustus Saint-Gaudens and Kenyon Cox. She was a member of the Guild of Arts and Crafts and of Art Students' League.

Peddle Ball worked for the Tiffany Glass Company which exhibited her design at the 1893 Chicago Exposition.

In the late 1890s, Peddle Ball traveled to Europe. She was in Florence, Italy from September 1895 to March 1896. She had a studio in Paris for several years beginning in May 1897.

She received honorable mention at Paris Exhibition, 1900 the figure "Victory" on the United States building at the Exposition. Additionally she created a memorial fountain at Flushing, Long Island, a medallion portrait of Miss Cox of Terre Haute, a monument to a child in the same city.

Peddle Ball returned to the United States in 1902. She maintained a working studio for the rest of her life, specializing in small bronzes depicting children.

She died in Harwinton, Connecticut, on October 1, 1938, aged 68.

=== Family ===
Caroline Peddle Ball was de younger sister of John B. Peddle. She Ball married Bertrand E. Ball on October 16, 1902. They had one child. The marriage would end in divorce.

== Works ==
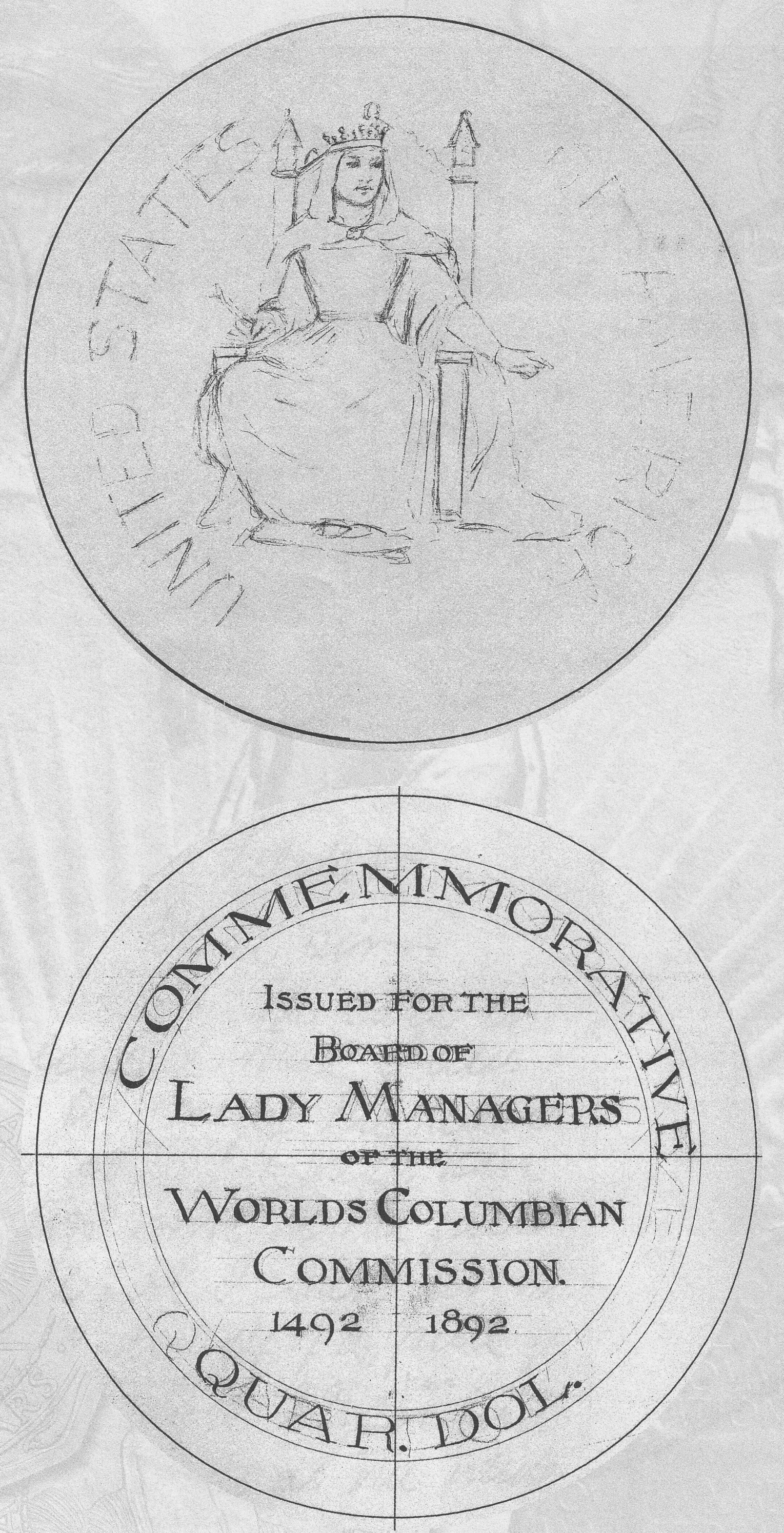
Initial sketch for the Isabella quarter, 1893

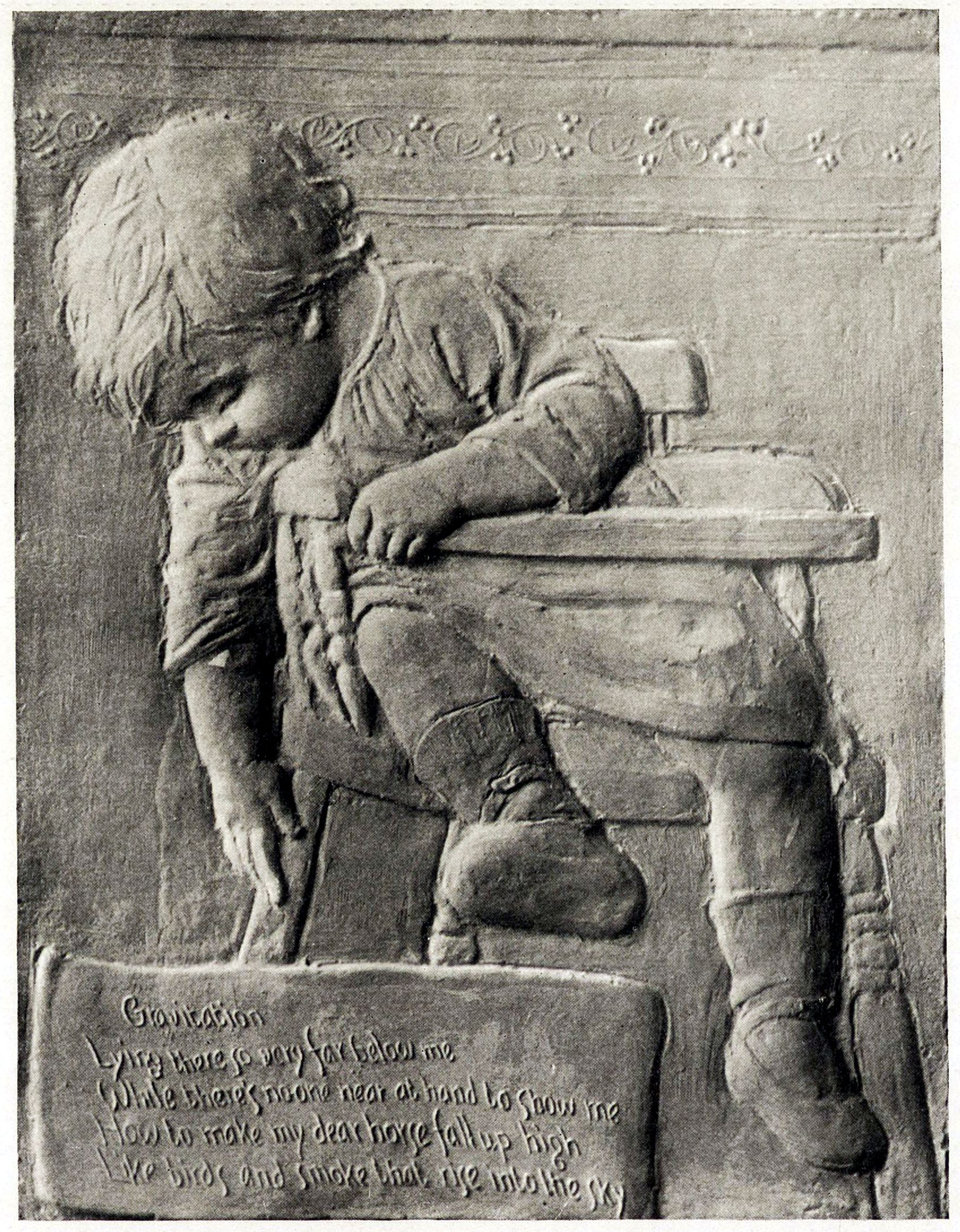
Gravitation. Medallion, c. 1906

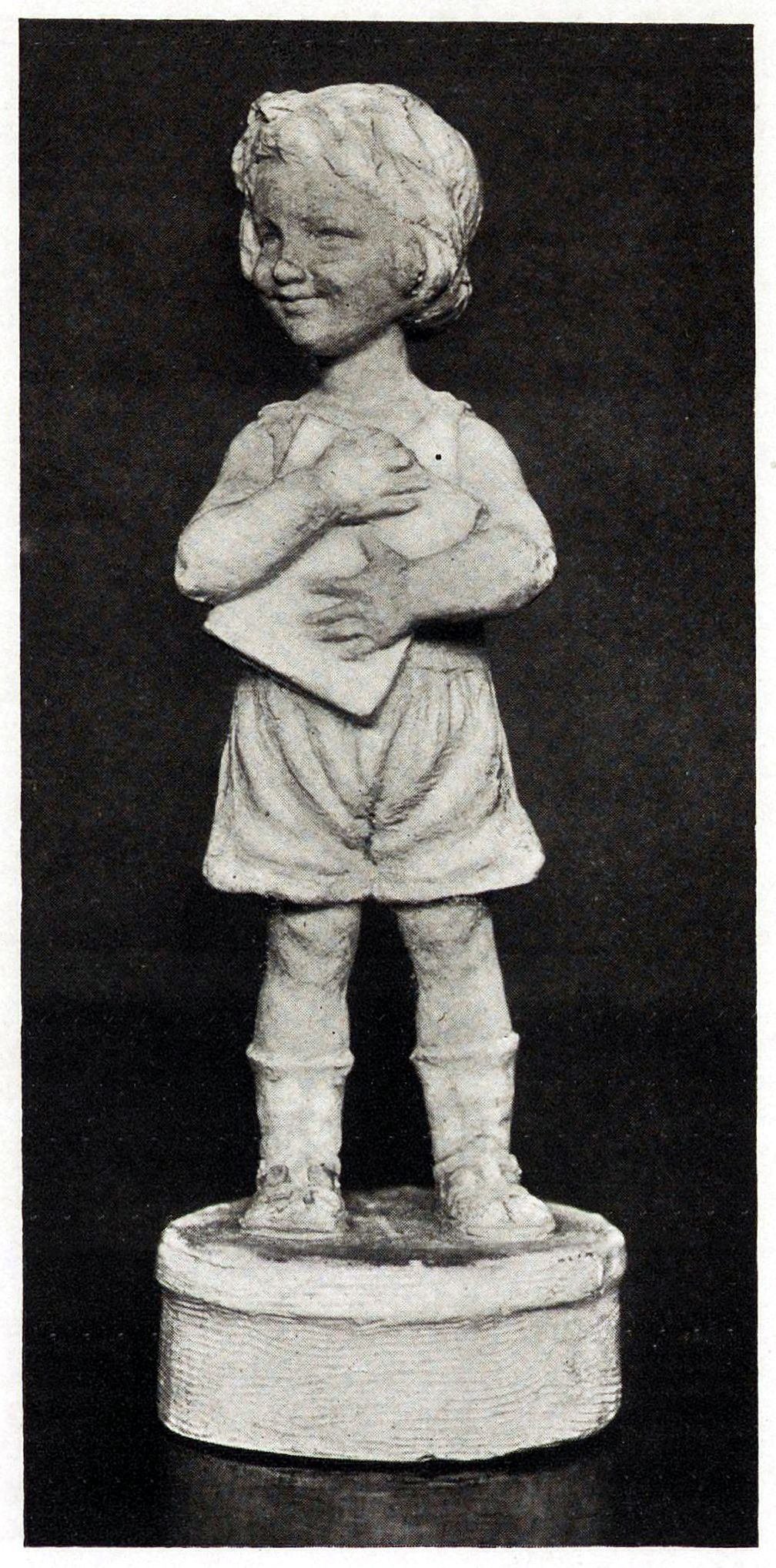
Child with picture book. Figurine, c. 1906
