= Bertha Yerex Whitman =

American architect

- Born: Bertha Louise Yerex; 1892; Newaygo, Michigan, U.S.
- Died: 1984 (aged 91–92); Cass City, Michigan, U.S.
- Other names: Bertha Yerex, Bertha Whitman
- Education: University of Michigan
- Occupation: Architect
- Spouse: Lloyd E. Whitman
- Children: Suzanne, Charles
- Practice: Perkins, Fellows, and Hamilton; Bertha Yerex Whitman

Bertha Yerex Whitman (1892–1984) was an American architect who was the first woman to graduate in architecture from the University of Michigan. She had a long career as an architect in Illinois, especially around Evanston and Glencoe.

== Early life and education ==
Bertha Louise Yerex was born in Newaygo, Michigan, in 1892, the middle of three daughters of Charles Napier Yerex and Emma Retta (Giles) Yerex. Her father was the town's train station master and telegrapher. She received a teaching certificate from Eastern Michigan University in 1911 and went on to teach at the local elementary school for two years. Prompted by an aunt who taught her to design quilts, as well as by her own mathematical inclinations, she took a correspondence course in mechanical drafting. This led her to decide on a career in architecture.

She entered the University of Michigan College of Architecture and Design in 1914. She later recalled that the dean had initially told her she would not be welcome in the program, but she enrolled anyway. While at the university, she was a cofounder of the T-Square Society, a student club for women engineers and architects. When America entered World War I and most of her male classmates enlisted in the army, she took a leave from the college to support the war effort and so that she would be able to graduate with her classmates. During her two-year hiatus from school, she worked in Detroit, Michigan, as the Dodge Brothers Company's first woman draughtsperson. After the war, she returned to her studies and in 1920 became the college's first women architecture graduate.

In 1919, she married Lloyd E. Whitman, with whom she went on to have two children, Suzanne and Charles.

== Career ==
Whitman moved to the Chicago area in 1921. She initially had difficulty finding work in Chicago architecture offices, even as a draughtsperson. Eventually she joined the firm of Perkins, Fellows, and Hamilton, where her drafting skills were highly valued. She obtained her Illinois architectural license in 1926 and began taking on independent commissions for residences. She settled in Evanston, Illinois, and during a career spanning six decades designed more than 50 residences as well as apartment buildings, schools, and churches. She worked mostly around Evanston, Glencoe, and Chicago, but she also designed buildings in the states of Florida, Georgia, Tennessee, Michigan, and Wisconsin.

The Depression years were difficult for Whitman after her husband's business failed and he left her in 1934. To better support her children, she got a job with the state of Illinois as a social worker, but within a few years had moved over to remodeling offices for government buildings. Whitman simultaneously kept her solo architectural practice going, working closely with Evanston-area builders. One of her designs won a local award as well as being showcased in the women’s architecture display at the 1933 World’s Fair. Whitman valued house plans that made efficient use of space and were oriented towards the needs of daily domestic life, and she took pride in the fact that they were sturdy and well engineered.

In 1928, Whitman became one of the nine founders of the Women's Architectural Club of Chicago, along with Juliet Peddle. The club was active into the 1940s, when it merged with the American Institute of Architecture.

Whitman liked to travel to study world architectural styles, and over the course of her lifetime visited countries in Europe, Africa, and Asia. In the 1960s she wrote a book about her travels, A Tyro Takes a Trip (1971).

Whitman returned to Michigan later in life and lived in Ann Arbor. She died in Cass City, Michigan, in 1984. Her papers are held by the Bentley Historical Library at the University of Michigan and include photographs of buildings she designed.
