= Charles Lee Reese =

American chemist and chemical director of DuPont

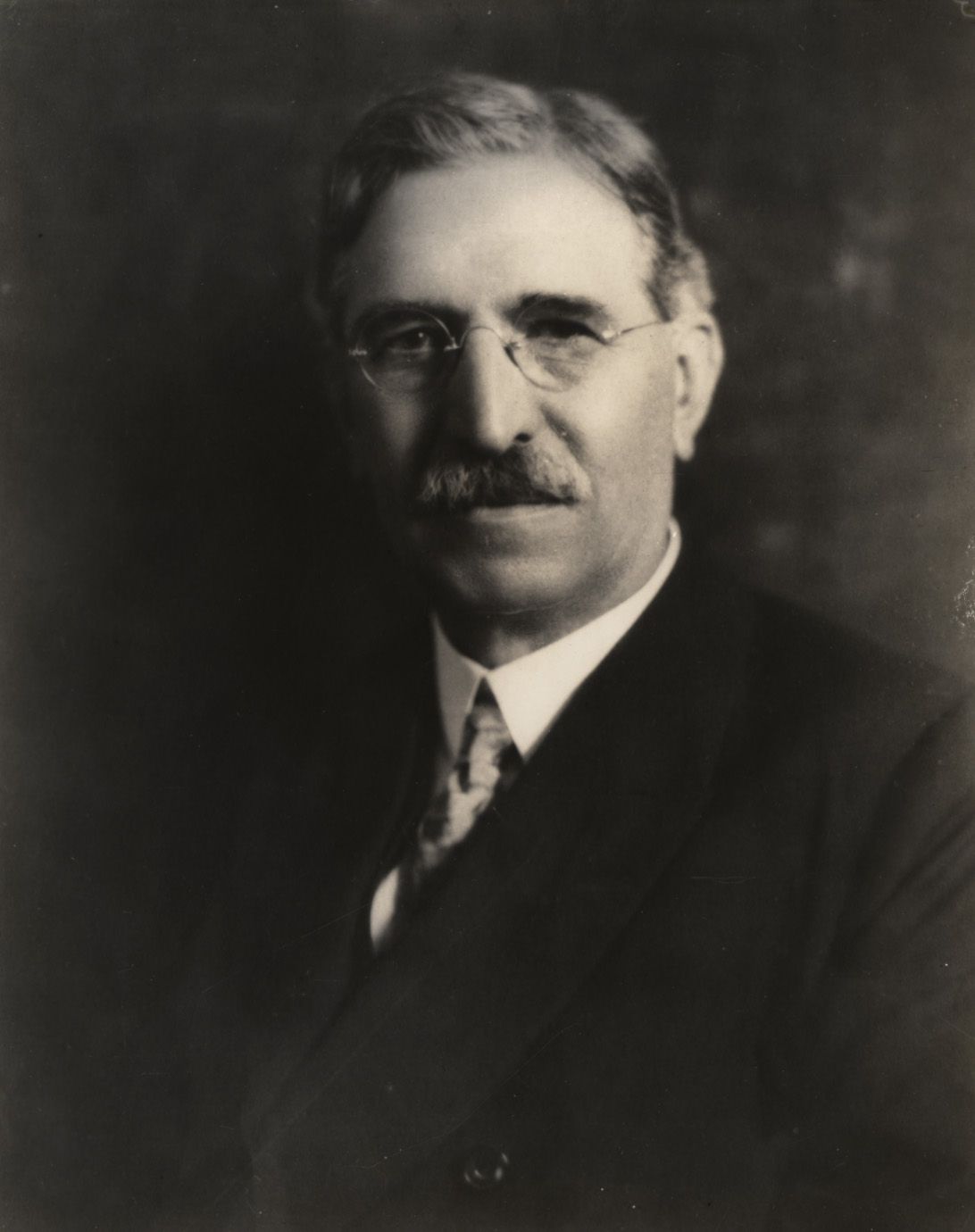
- Portrait of Charles Lee Reese
- Born: November 4, 1862; Baltimore, Maryland, US
- Died: April 12, 1940 (aged 77); Jacksonville, Florida, US
- Resting place: Wilmington, Delaware, US
- Education: The University of Virginia and Heidelberg University
- Scientific career
- Fields: Chemistry and industrial chemistry
- Workplaces: The DuPont Company; Johns Hopkins University; The Citadel
- Doctoral advisor: Robert Bunsen

Charles Lee Reese (November 4, 1862 – April 12, 1940) was an American chemist and chemical director of DuPont serving from 1911 to 1924.

== Early life ==
Reese was born in Baltimore, Maryland, in 1862. He attended the University of Virginia for his undergraduate career. Upon graduation he was admitted to the University of Heidelberg in Heidelberg, Germany in 1884. While attending Heidelberg he was a student of Robert Bunsen. He received his Ph.D. in chemistry in 1886.

== Academic career ==
Reese's undergraduate degree was granted by the University of Virginia in 1884. He moved to Germany for his graduate studies. A student of Robert Bunsen at Heidelberg University and Viktor Meyer at the University of Göttingen, Reese completed his PhD in 1886.

Reese returned to the United States and took a position as an assistant in chemistry at Johns Hopkins University, which he held until 1888. After a brief tenure of only one year as professor of chemistry at Wake Forest College, he became a professor at The Citadel, The Military College of South Carolina, where he taught for eight years. He returned to teach at Hopkins for another four years until turning to industrial chemistry in 1900. He was elected to the American Philosophical Society in 1922.

== Industrial career and DuPont ==
In 1900, Reese took a position as chief chemist at The New Jersey Zinc Company. While there, he focused primarily on the contact process of sulfuric acid, developing it to a satisfactory working basis. As a result he drew the attention of the DuPont Company in 1902 and was appointed chief chemist. He established the Eastern Laboratory and was made director. In 1906 he was placed in direct control of the chemical division of the high explosives operative department. Promoted to chemical director of DuPont in 1911, he oversaw the development of new processes for creating raw materials needed for military explosives in World War I.

During his tenure with DuPont, Reese was an instrumental player in the development of research and development practices at the company. Under his command as chemical director, multiple labs were centralized and organized into a two-prong strategy. Eastern Laboratory (Reese's original posting within DuPont) would focus on short term projects which could rapidly respond (and profit) to the demands of the market. In contrast, the Experimental Station would focus on long term, potentially risky projects. He defended the lack of immediate profitability by the Experimental Station, claiming it brought "enormous, though intangible, rewards" to DuPont. This belief lead to his decision regarding "complete and detailed" information on smokeless powder and refusal to break apart the research labs, despite pressure from Congress and the company.

Within months of Reese's report, World War I began, and this decision proved to be an enormous boon to the Du Pont Company. The cash generated by Du Pont's smokeless powder sales during the war would create the capital necessary for the company's ventures into other product lines, thus providing the basis for Du Pont's rise as a giant, diversified company. (pg.61)

Reese retired from the board of DuPont on January 1, 1931.
