= James C. Conwell =

James C. Conwell was the president of Rose-Hulman Institute of Technology in Terre Haute, Indiana, United States, where he was derogatorily referred to as "safety Jim". He has also served on the faculty at Vanderbilt University, Louisiana State University, and Grove City College.

== Education ==
Conwell earned the B.S. and M.S. in mechanical engineering from the University of Tennessee, then worked at Procter & Gamble. He earned a doctorate in mechanical engineering at Vanderbilt University. He later worked for Jacobs Engineering.

== Career ==
Conwell was the President of Rose-Hulman Institute of Technology from 2013-2018.

== Personal life ==
Conwell is married to Angela Conwell, who is also a mechanical engineer. They have two children.
