= Charles A. Catlin =

American chemist, inventor, and author

Charles Albert Catlin (1849–1916) was an American chemist, inventor, and author.

He was born in Burlington, Vermont, and graduated from the University of Vermont in 1872.

He was a chemist at the Rumford Chemical Works in Providence, Rhode Island, for forty years and the inventor of chemical processes for phosphates.

He was a charter member of the American Institute of Chemical Engineers. He was an active member of the Central Congregational Church in Providence, Rhode Island.

He wrote "Baking Powders: A Treatise" published by Rumford Chemical Works in 1899.

In 1887, he analyzed samples relating to the Sylvester Manor on Shelter Island.
