= Chem-E-Car =

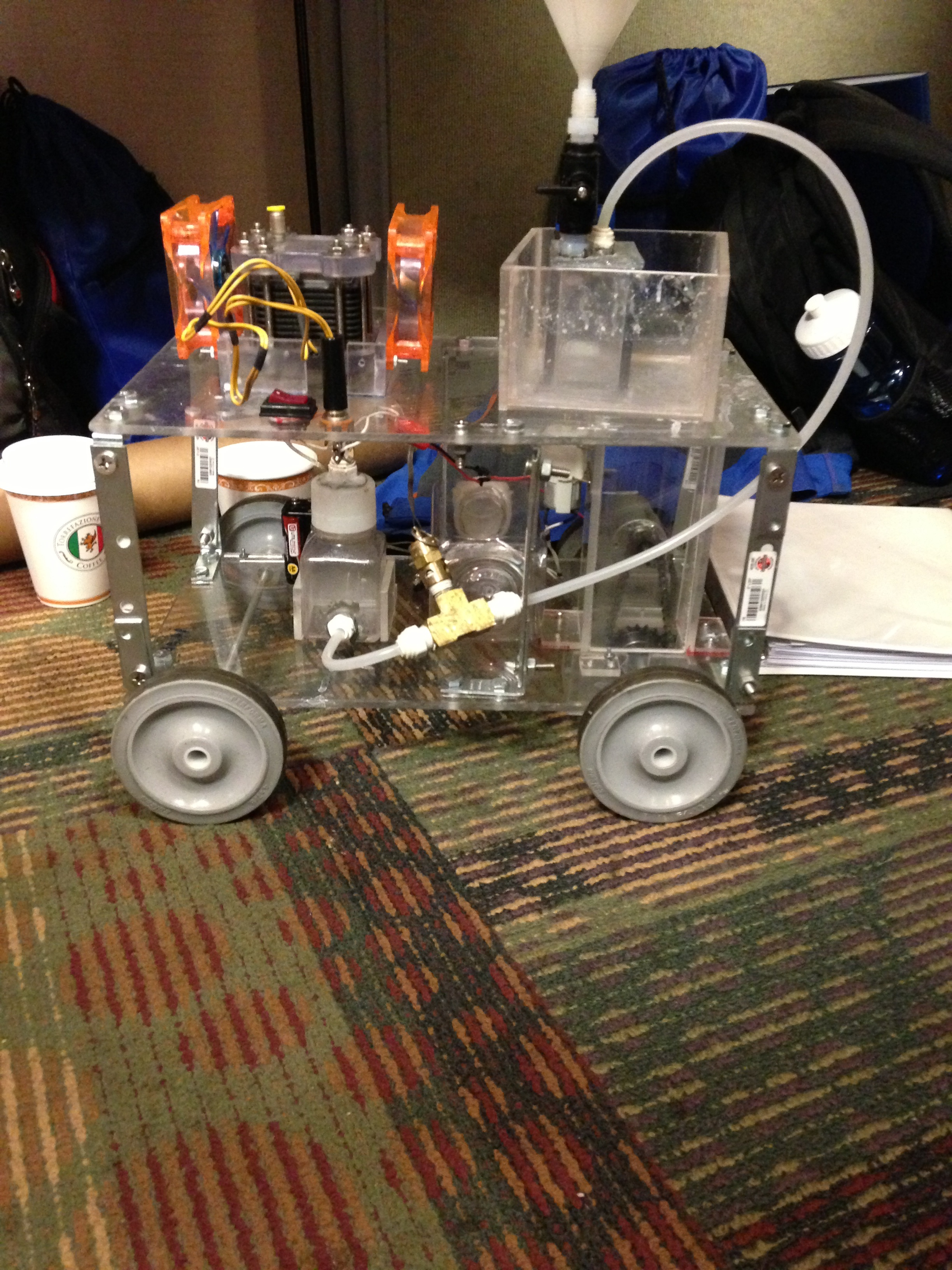
The University of Florida's 2013 AIChE Regional Conference Chem-E Car

The Chem-E-Car Competition is an annual college engineering competition, mainly geared towards students studying Chemical Engineering or similar disciplines.

According to the competition's official rules, students must design small-scale automobiles that operate by chemical means, along with a poster describing their research. During the competition, they must drive their car a fixed distance (judged on how close the car is to the finish line) down a wedge-shaped course in order to demonstrate its capabilities. The exact distance (15–30 meters) and payload is revealed to the participants one hour before the competition. The size of designed cars cannot exceed certain specifications and cars must operate using "green" methods, which do not release any pollution or waste in the form of a visible liquid or gas, such as exhaust. The dimensions of the car are to be within 20x30x40 cm. This competition is hosted in the United States by the AIChE (American Institute of Chemical Engineers), and winners of the competitions receive various awards, depending on how they placed.

== Awards ==
=== Regional Competition Awards (funded by AIChE) ===
Poster Competition
- Ribbons for 1st, 2nd, and 3rd place
- Ribbon for Most Creative Drive System
- Ribbon for Most Creative Vehicle Design

Performance Competition
- 1st place: $200 and Ribbon
- 2nd place: $100 and Ribbon
- 3rd place: Honorable mention and Ribbon
- Ribbons for 4th and 5th place finishers
- Ribbon for Spirit of Competition

=== National Competition Awards (funded by Chevron and the H. Scott Fogler Endowment Fund) ===
- 1st place: $2,000 and a trophy.
- 2nd place: $1,000 and a trophy.
- 3rd place: $500 and a trophy.
- 4th and 5th place: trophy.
- Best Use of a Biological Reaction to Power a Car – $500 Prize: Sponsored by the Society for Biological Engineers
- SAChE Safety Award – For the best application of the principles of chemical process safety to the Chem-E-Car competition. Award consists of a trophy.
- Spirit of the Competition – This award is given to the team displaying the most team spirit as decided by a panel of judges. Award consists of a trophy.
- Most Innovative Car Design – The winner is decided by a panel of judges during the poster competition. Award consists of a trophy.
- Best Video – The winner is awarded with a trophy.
- Golden Tire Award – In 2002, Northeastern University team members created this award to recognize the team with the most creative vehicle design. The national committee has adopted this as an annual award. The winning entry is decided by a ballot cast by each team entered in the competition. Award consists of a trophy.
- Chem-E-Car Poster Award – 1st–5th places are awarded with a trophy.
- Outstanding Sportsmanship Award – The winning team is awarded with a trophy.
- Best Team Name – The winning team is awarded with a trophy.

=== Past National Performance Competition Winners ===
- 2024 – Cornell University
- 2023 – Auburn University
- 2022 – University of Toledo
- 2021 – University of Toledo
- 2020 – Virginia Tech
- 2019 – Virginia Tech
- 2018 – Georgia Institute of Technology
- 2017 – Institut Teknologi Sepuluh Nopember
- 2016 – Korea Advanced Institute of Science and Technology (KAIST)
- 2015 – Cornell University and McGill University (tie)
- 2014 – University of Utah
- 2013 – University of Tulsa
- 2012 – Cornell University
- 2011 – University of Puerto Rico at Mayagüez
- 2010 – Cornell University
- 2009 – Northeastern University
- 2008 – Cornell University
- 2007 – Cooper Union
- 2006 – University of Puerto Rico at Mayagüez
- 2005 – Tennessee Tech University
- 2004 – University of Tulsa
- 2003 – University of Dayton
- 2002 – University of Kentucky, Paducah
- 2001 – Colorado State University
- 2000 – University of Akron
- 1999 – University of Michigan

== Rules ==
The competition has various rules:

- The only energy source for the propulsion of the car is a chemical reaction. No liquid discharge is allowed. No obnoxious odor discharge is allowed.
- No commercial batteries are allowed as the power source.
- The stopping mechanism has to be controlled by a chemical reaction. No brakes, mechanical or electronic timing devices are allowed.
- All components of the car must fit into a box of dimensions no larger than 40 cm x 30 cm x 20 cm (shoebox-sized). The car may be disassembled to meet this requirement.
- The cost of the contents of the "shoe box" and the chemicals must not exceed $2,000. The vehicle cost includes the donated cost of any equipment. The time donated by university machine shops and other personnel will not be included in the total price of the car. It is expected that every university has equal access to these resources. The cost of pressure testing is also not included in the capital cost of the car.

== Poster ==
Each car is required to have a scientific poster explaining how the car runs (power source), some of its specific features, and how it is environmentally friendly. Judges score these posters on three general criteria: the quality of the poster and team member presentations (50%), the creativity of the design, unique features, and safety considerations (35%), and demonstration of knowledge of reactions, calibration methods by all team members, and ability by team members to answer questions posed by the judges (15%).

Teams also must undergo a vehicle safety inspection during the poster session. Only teams that pass the safety inspection may continue to the performance competition.

== Example reactions ==
Some ideas for chemical reactions have been using pressurized gases (creating oxygen or CO_{2} gas through a chemical reaction and allowing it to build pressure) or using electricity created by the dissolving of metals in certain acids (basic battery). One remarkable idea by Cooper Union was to use a fuel cell (a cell that converts fuel to electricity via an electrochemical reaction) to power their car.

Winners in this competition are not determined by whether their car is faster or more powerful, but how accurate their chemical reaction to stop their vehicle is. This is quite difficult, especially when the distance the car has to travel is unknown until the day of the competition. So teams must find a method that is flexible enough to fit a range of distances, and reliable enough so it does not fail with real world variables (temperature, humidity, track roughness, changes in elevation, etc.). Winners in the past have had a variety of ways of dealing with this problem, such as an iodine clock reaction. This reaction works by using two clear solutions (many variations) that change color after a time delay (the exact time can be found experimentally). When applied to the car, the team used a simple image sensor that could tell when the solutions changed color, at which point the cars power would shut off by cutting the circuit. While the process itself is somewhat simple, accounting for the unknown variables like the payload and distance is quite difficult.
