= Rose–Hulman Institute of Technology =

Private university in Terre Haute, Indiana, US

Coordinates: 39°28′57″N 87°19′27″W

- Former names: Terre Haute School of Industrial Science (1874–1875); Rose Polytechnic Institute (1875–1971)
- Motto: Latin: Labor et scientia
- Motto in English: Work and Knowledge
- Type: Private university
- Established: 1874; 152 years ago
- Accreditation: Higher Learning Commission
- Academic affiliations: AITU; MUPEC
- Endowment: $324.1 million (2025)
- President: Robert A. Coons
- Provost: Ellen S. Goldey
- Faculty: 196 (fall 2022)
- Undergraduates: 2,169 (fall 2022)
- Postgraduates: 19 (fall 2022)
- Location: Terre Haute, Indiana, United States
- Campus: 1,300 acres (530 ha); Suburban
- Colors: Red and white
- Nickname: Fightin' Engineers
- Sporting affiliations: NCAA Division III – HCAC
- Mascot: Rosie the Elephant
- Website: rose-hulman.edu

Rose–Hulman Institute of Technology (RHIT) is a private university in Terre Haute, Indiana, United States. It was founded in 1874 and houses twelve academic departments with over thirty undergraduate and graduate degree programs in science, engineering, technology, and engineering management, leading to bachelor's and master's degrees.

== History ==
Photograph c. 1881 of the original campus building at 13th and Locust in Terre Haute

=== Founding (1874–1917) ===
Founder Chauncey Rose, along with nine friends, created the Terre Haute School of Industrial Science in 1874 to provide technical training after encountering difficulties in recruiting local engineers during construction of his railroads. Mr. Rose donated the land, at 13th and Locust St., and the majority of the funds needed to start the new school. A year later, the cornerstone of the new institution was laid and the name was changed to Rose Polytechnic Institute despite the objections of the president of the board of managers and chief benefactor, Mr. Rose. The original campus was a single building, with no dormitories or recreational facilities.

The first class of 48 students entered in 1883, chosen from 58 applicants. All students were male, and 37 came from Indiana. All but four chose to major in mechanical engineering, with civil engineering and chemistry the only other majors. Nearly half of the original students would eventually leave their studies before graduation for several reasons, including poor grades or conduct. The first president was Charles O. Thompson, who modeled the education of Rose Polytechnic after eastern institutions, making it the first private engineering college west of the Alleghenies.

During the early years of the school, finance was a major concern. Many faculty and staff accepted pay cuts to stay at the institution.

In 1889 the school awarded what it considered to be the first chemical engineering degree in the country. In 1897 John B. Peddle was appointed professor of machine design, a post he held until 1933. In 1910 he published the Construction of Graphical Charts, which was the first book in the English language treating the art of graphical representation.

=== Relocation and war years (1917–1951) ===
In 1917, the school, having grown to more than 300 students, moved from 13th and Locust Street to a new site consisting of 123 acres (0.50 km^{2}) of farmland east of town, donated by the Hulman family of Terre Haute. The old location was used continuously by the Vigo County School District from 1922 to 2013; as of 2020 the Terre Haute Boys & Girls Club occupies the site. The cornerstone of the new campus was laid in 1922. The new campus consisted of an academic building (now known as Moench Hall) and the institute's first dormitory, Deming Hall, both of which are still in use today.

Early life at Rose consisted of social fraternities, athletics, and the occasional "high jinks". A popular "high jinks" involved the sophomore class inviting the freshman class to a baseball game but were told to "leave their pipes with the nurse". The freshmen would produce the pipes at a specific time and a brawl would ensue.

During World War I, Rose Polytechnic trained students in technical subjects such as vehicle maintenance, and created a Reserve Officers' Training Corps (ROTC) Engineer unit which later became the Wabash Battalion Army ROTC program. During World War II the ROTC unit was replaced with an Army Specialized Training Unit and students could enter and graduate after every quarter to support the war effort. This enrollment schedule continued through the post-war years until 1951.

=== 1960s–1970s ===
In recognition of the Hulman family's significant contributions and continued financial support, in particular a $15 million addition to the endowment, Rose Polytechnic was renamed Rose–Hulman Institute of Technology in 1971.

During the 1960s and 1970s, growth accelerated under president John A. Logan. Five new residence halls, a new student union, library, and a student recreation center were all constructed between 1963 and 1976. Permission was sought and received to increase the student population to 1000.

The quarterly cryptology journal Cryptologia was founded and published at RHIT from 1977 to 1995, at which time it was moved to the United States Military Academy.

=== 1990s–present ===
For most of its history, Rose–Hulman was a men's only institution with some cooperative arrangements with Saint Mary Of-The-Woods College women's school and Indiana State University. It voted to become coeducational in 1991, with the first full-time women students starting in 1995.

In the decade following 1995, Rose–Hulman's growth was aided by a major fundraising campaign, "Vision to be the Best". Originally a $100 million campaign over ten years, it met its goal in half the time. The goal was extended to $200 million, and by the end of the campaign in June 2004, over $250 million had been raised. In 1997, many physical changes were made to the Rose–Hulman campus. Using a gift from the F. W. Olin Foundation, an expansion of Olin Hall known as the Olin Advanced Learning Center opened. Additionally, The John T Myers Center for Technological Research opened, with space for research laboratories, presentation rooms, classrooms, and academic offices. Shook Field House was replaced by the $20 million Sports and Recreation Center, which the National Football League's Indianapolis Colts used for their summer training camp from 1999 to 2010. In 2002, Hatfield Hall, a theater and alumni center, was opened.

After the 2004 retirement of institute president Samuel Hulbert, who had led the school since 1976, the college faced a leadership crisis. Soon after John J. Midgley arrived as the new president, rumors of conflict between Midgley and the administration started to circulate. Students, some wearing T-shirts proclaiming "Hit the Road Jack", held a rally calling for Midgley's resignation. Midgley resigned as president of the institute on June 11, 2005, less than a year into his presidency, after the faculty, staff, and Student Government Association approved votes of no confidence. During the succeeding academic year, Robert Bright, the chairman of the Board of Trustees, served as interim chief executive officer.

In 2006, Gerald Jakubowski, Vice President and Professor of Engineering at Arizona State University, became the 13th president of the institute, taking over July 1, 2006. He resigned in 2009, and the Board of Trustees elected Matt Branam to serve as interim president. He became president later that year. Branam died of a heart attack in April 2012, and the cabinet subsequently selected Robert A. Coons as the institute's interim president. In 2013, the Board of Trustees named James C. Conwell as the institute's 15th president, starting May 1, 2013.

In 2017, the school acquired 4.5 square kilometres (1.7 sq mi) from the former home of Mari Hulman George.

In 2018, Conwell resigned as president, and Senior Vice President Robert Coons was appointed to serve as acting president and then, in November 2018, as the university president. In the same year, the Hulman Memorial Student Union was renovated and renamed the Mussallem Union after the primary donors, the Mussallem Family. The Mussallem Union is centrally located on campus and provides student meeting spaces, dining areas, conference rooms, health services, bookstore, and administrative space.

In 2019, an expansion of the Branam Innovation Center (BIC), the Kremer Innovation Center (KIC) opened. The BIC and KIC provide rapid prototyping and manufacturing options to students, in addition to housing thermofluids and wet lab facilities, conference rooms, classrooms, and project team workshops.

In 2021, the New Academic Building was opened, with funding provided by a $15 million lead gift by an anonymous donor. The New Academic Building is home to the Engineering Design program, chemistry laboratory facilities, food science laboratory, breakout and study rooms, as well as a large atrium. Together with Moench Hall and the Myers Center, a new courtyard was opened. The New Academic building is the first building in the state of Indiana to apply for WELL recognition.

== Campus ==
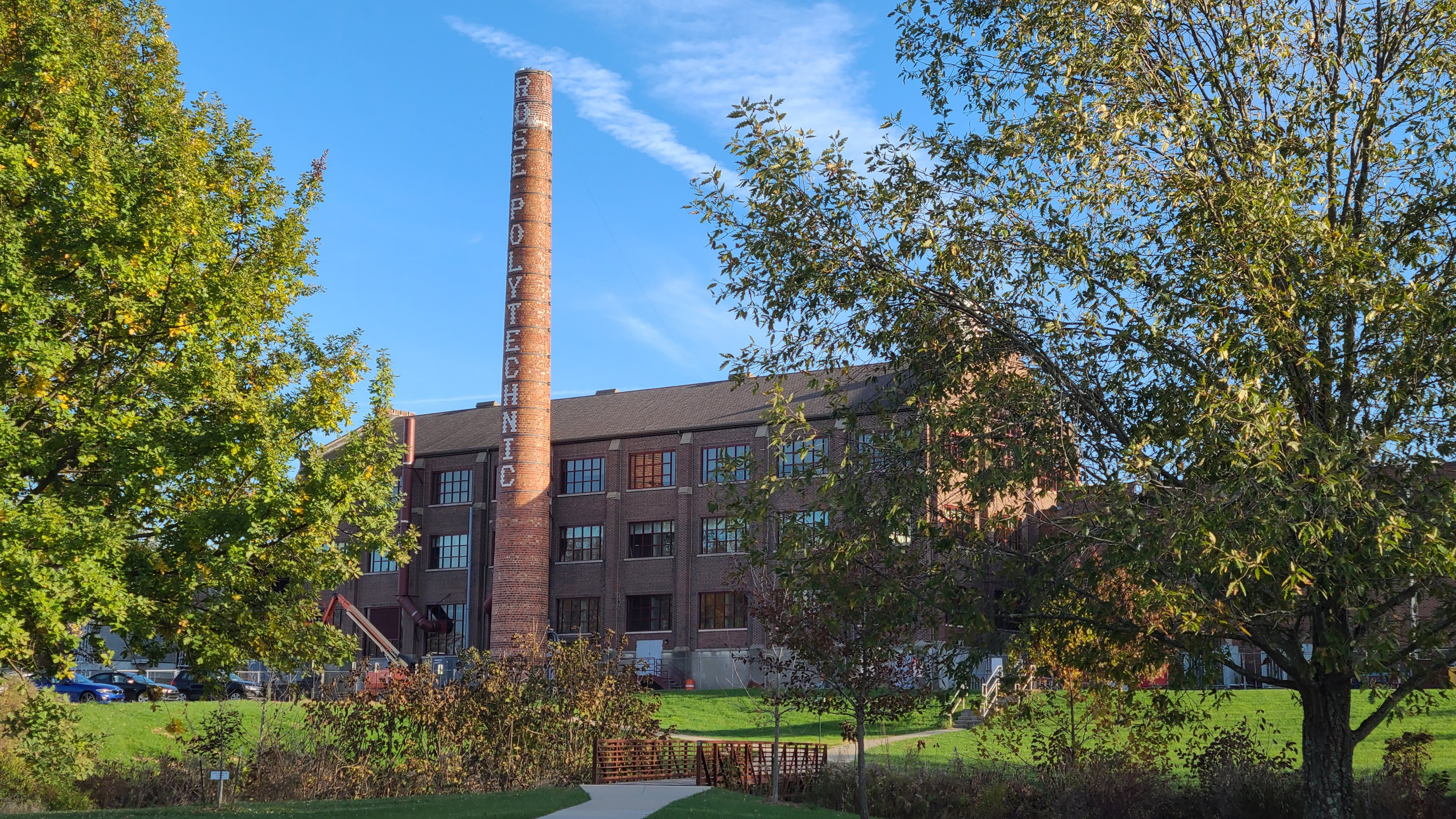
Moench Hall

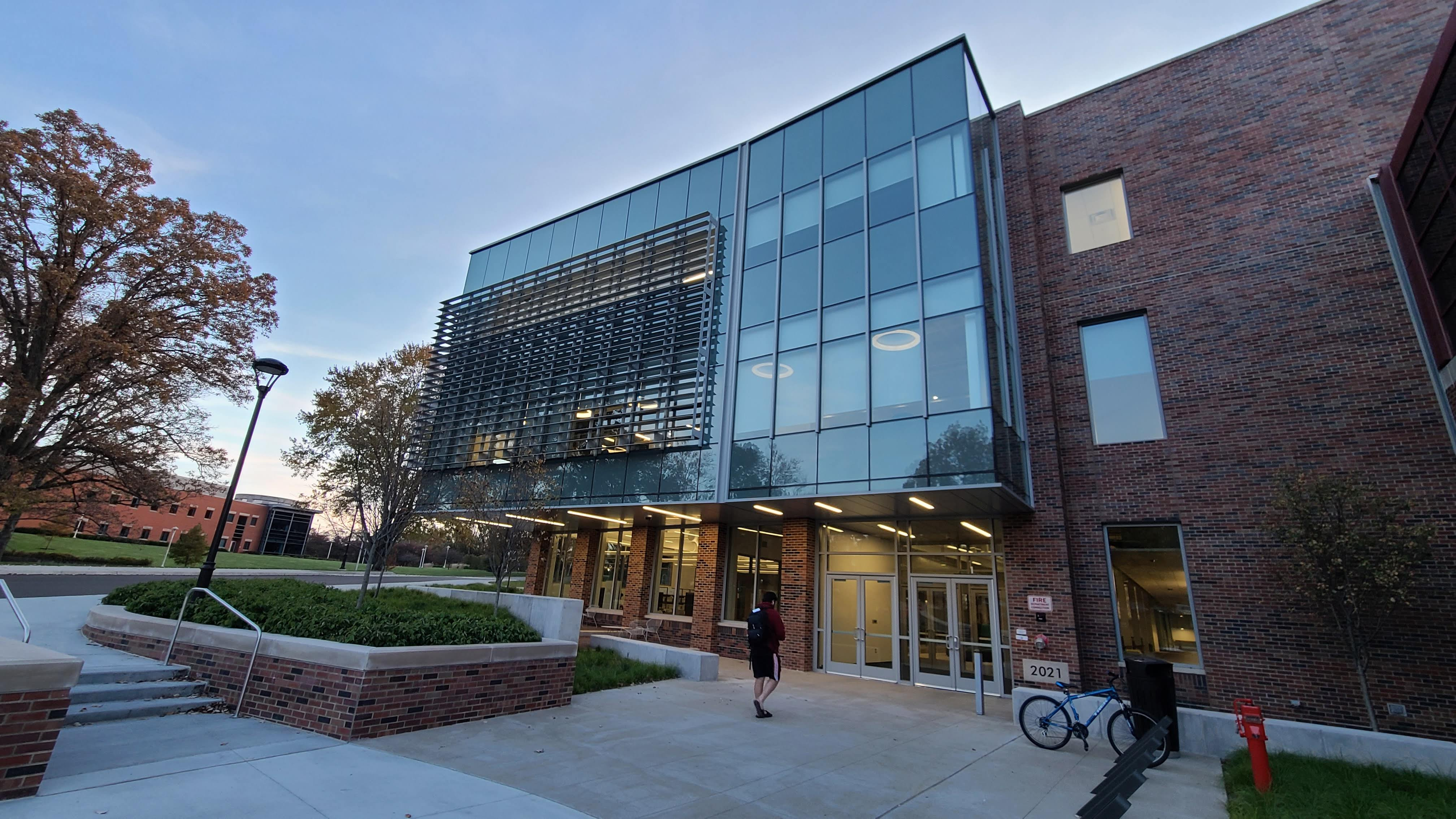
Fowler Academic Building

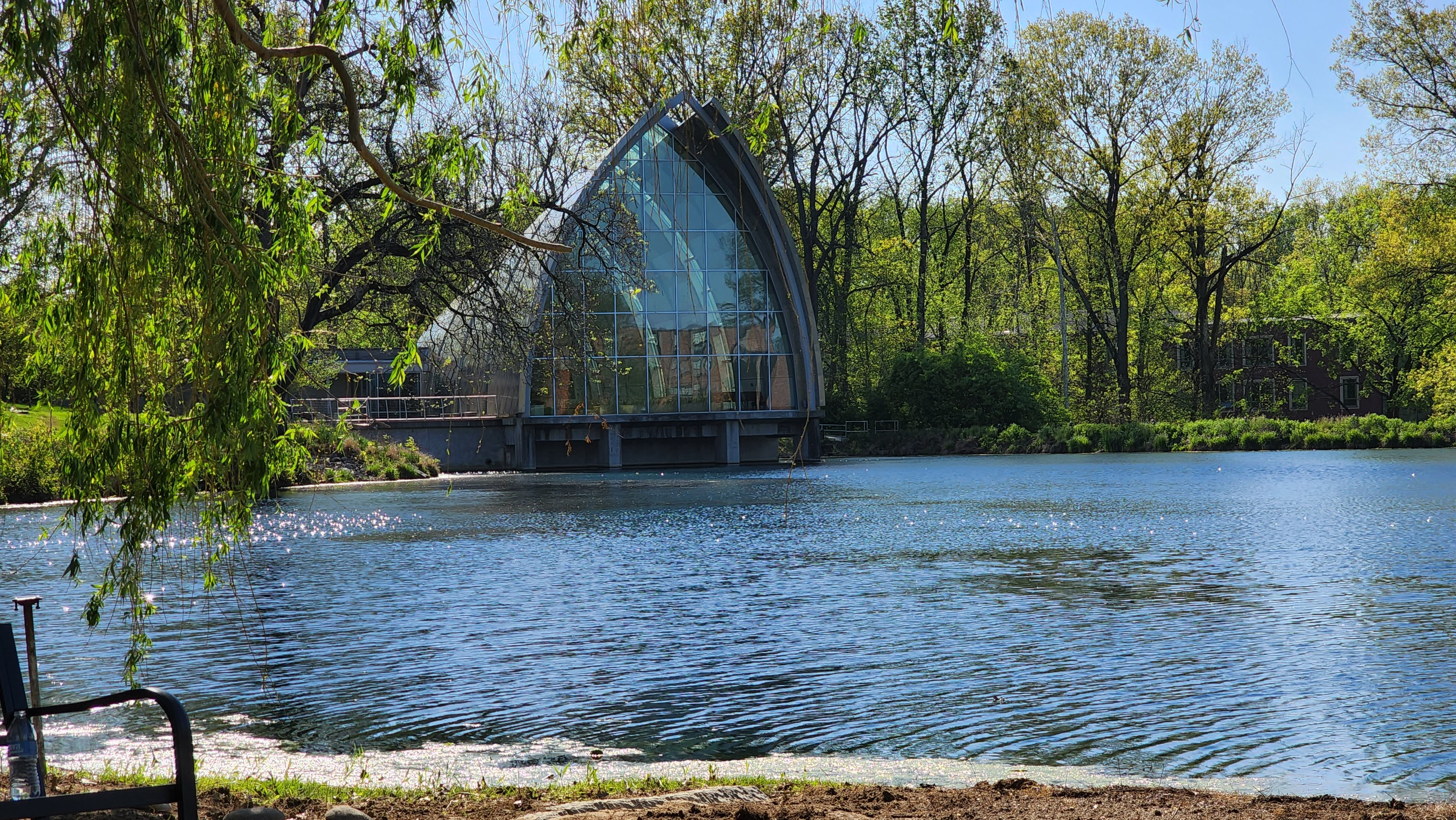
White Chapel

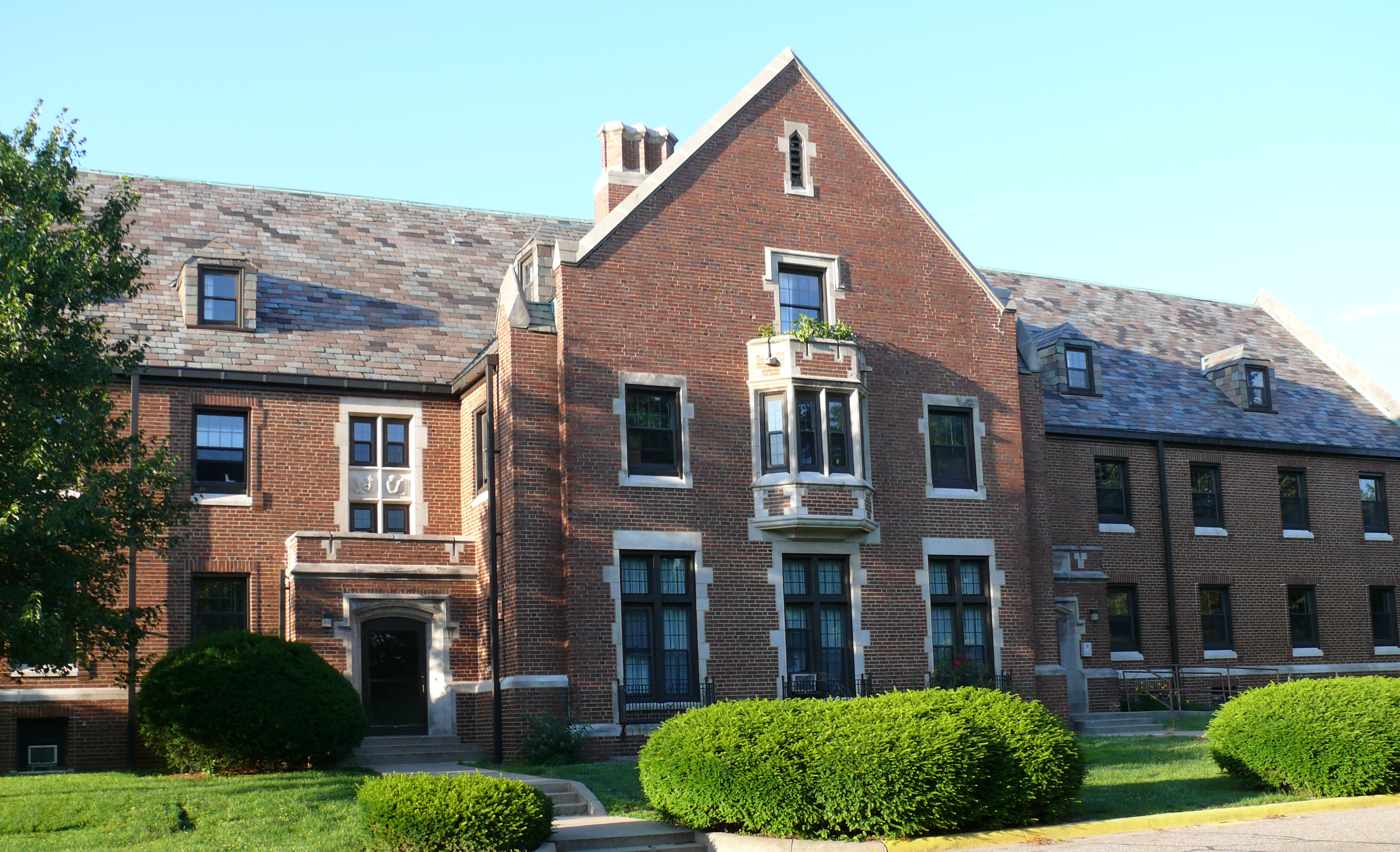
Deming Hall

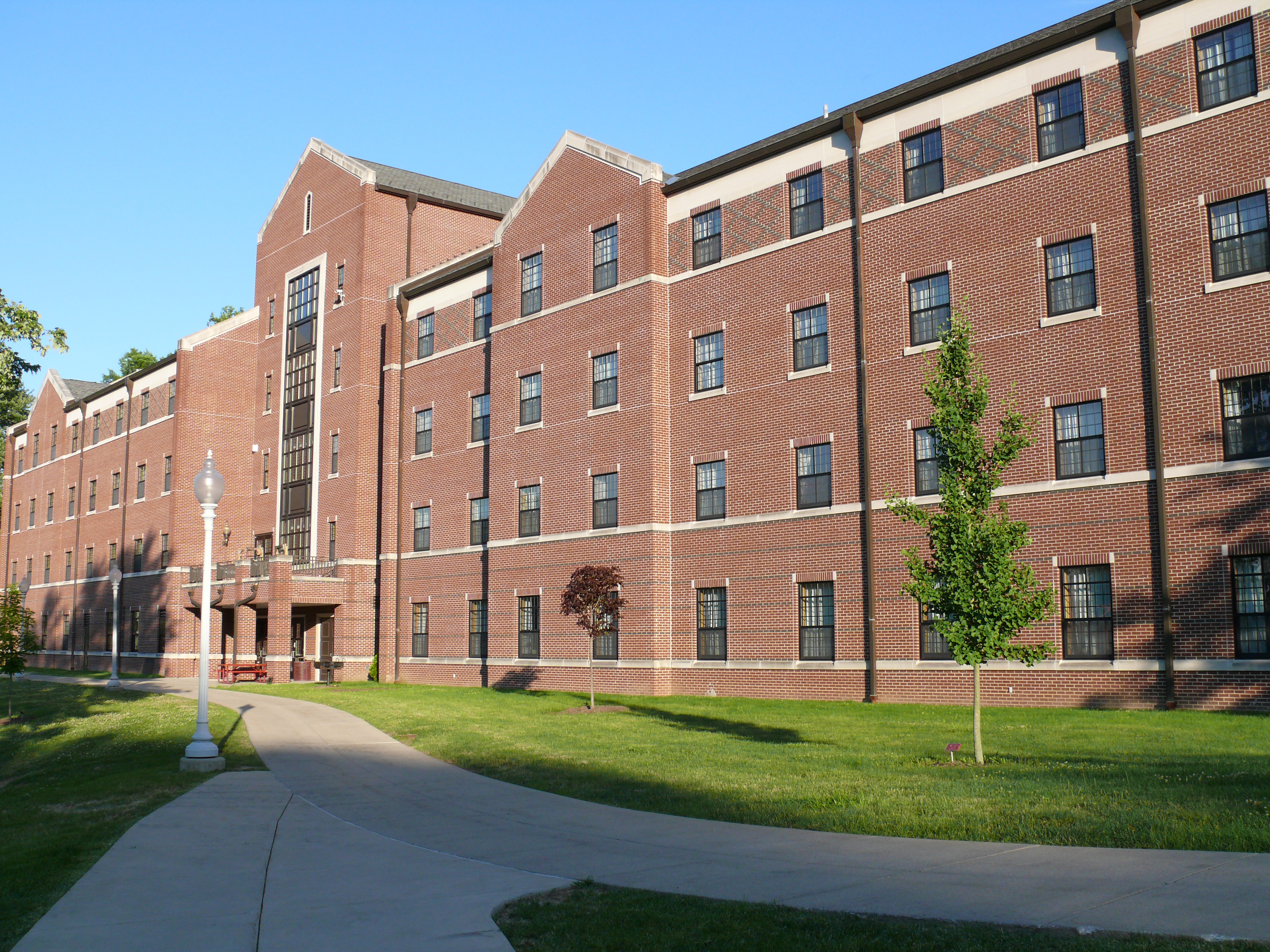
Percopo Hall

Most of the university property is in the Terre Haute city limits, though parts extend outside of the city limits. The university as a whole is in Lost Creek Township.

== Academics ==
The curricula at RHIT concentrate on engineering and the natural sciences. The school's primary focus is undergraduate education, though there is a small graduate program for master's degree students. There are no doctoral programs. As of 2021, Rose–Hulman has 189 faculty members, 99% of whom hold a PhD. The current student-to-faculty ratio is 11:1. Admission to the institute remains competitive due to its self-selecting admissions class and applicant sharing with Purdue, and other top universities. In 2022, 602 freshman students enrolled out of 3,353 accepted applicants.

=== Accreditation ===
Rose–Hulman has been regionally accredited by the Higher Learning Commission since 1916, with the most recent reaffirmation of accreditation having occurred in the 2014–2015 accreditation year. The Biomedical Engineering, Chemical Engineering, Civil Engineering, Computer Engineering, Computer Science, Electrical Engineering, Engineering Design, Engineering Physics, Mechanical Engineering, Optical Engineering, and Software Engineering programs are accredited by The Accreditation Board for Engineering and Technology (ABET).

In addition to institutional membership in the American Society for Engineering Education, the institute is also a member of the Association of Independent Technological Universities, a group formed to further the interests of private engineering schools.

=== Rankings and reputation ===
As of 2025, the institute has been ranked first among engineering colleges that do not offer a doctorate degree by U.S. News & World Report for 27 consecutive years. Each individual program assessed has also been ranked first since the magazine has published individual rankings. These programs are the Chemical, Civil, Computer, Electrical, Mechanical, and Biomedical Engineering programs (Biomedical Engineering programs have only received assessment in the 2015 rankings). Rose–Hulman is ranked 24th nationally for Return on Investment for Students by PayScale's 2024 rankings.

== Student life ==
The school has several competition teams that operate out of the Branam and Kremer Innovation Centers. These include Team Rose Motorsports, Grand Prix Engineering (Formula SAE), Human Powered Vehicle Challenge, Rose Rocketry, AIAA Design/Build/Fly, Chem-E-Car, MakerLab, Make It Happen, and various robotics competitions among many others.

There are eight social fraternities and three social sororities, some of which have their houses on campus. As of 2003, nearly 69% of the students were members of Greek social organizations.

Rose–Hulman Ventures serves as a source of internships and job opportunities with startups and established companies of all sizes for Rose students and alumni. Rose–Hulman Ventures was established in 1999 with a $30 million grant from the Lilly Endowment and received a $24.9 million follow-up grant in 2002.

=== Media ===
The school's student-run newspaper is The Rose Thorn.

Rose–Hulman has an amateur radio club, the Rose Tech Radio Club (call sign W9NAA), that maintains a dedicated on-campus station.

The Rose–Hulman Film Club produces student-directed short films.

The campus radio station was WMHD-FM 90.7 FM, "The Monkey". The station originally broadcast with a very low power transmitter and antenna located on campus, but later operated with an off-site transmitter at 1400 watts. The studio facilities for the station were in the basement of the BSB residence hall. The station was operated entirely by student volunteers, and all disc-jockeys choose their own format and playlists. In August 2014, the station was sold to Indiana State University.

== Athletics ==
The team's sports teams are called the Rose–Hulman Fightin' Engineers.

== Notable alumni ==
- Tim Cindric 1990, president of Penske Racing
- Barzilla W. Clark, 16th governor of Idaho
- Ernest R. Davidson 1958, National Medal of Science winner
- Lawrence Giacoletto 1938, transistor pioneer
- Marshall Goldsmith 1970, leadership coach and author
- John Hostettler 1983, former U.S. Congressman from Indiana
- Curtis Huttenhower 2000, professor at Harvard T.H. Chan School of Public Health
- Don Lincoln 1986, particle physicist
- Chris Mack 1982, lithography expert
- Art Nehf 1914, professional baseball player
- Abe Silverstein 1929, aeronautical engineer, NASA center director, and Guggenheim Medal winner
- Mat Roy Thompson 1890–1891, civil engineer and builder of Scotty's Castle
- Jim Umpleby 1980, former CEO of Caterpillar, Inc.
- Bernard Vonderschmitt 1944, co-founder of Xilinx
- Robert L. Wilkins 1986, judge, United States District Court for the District of Columbia
- Richard A. Correll 1986, Admiral and Commander of US Strategic Command

== Presidents ==
The following persons have served as president of Rose–Hulman Institute of Technology:

No.	Image	President	Term start	Term end	Refs.
Presidents of Rose Polytechnic Institute (1883–1971)
1		Charles O. Thompson	March 7, 1883	June 25, 1885 (Note: Died in office.)	
acting		Clarence Abiathar Waldo (Note: Best remembered for his contributions that resulted in the tabling of the infamous Indiana pi bill during the 1897 sitting of the Indiana General Assembly.)	1885	1886	
2		Thomas Corwin Mendenhall	September 1886	July 1889 (Note: Resigned to head the United States Coast and Geodetic Survey.)	
acting		Clarence Abiathar Waldo	September 1889	June 1890	
acting		Carl Leo Mees	September 1890	December 1890	
3		Henry Turner Eddy	January 1891	September 1894	
acting		Carl Leo Mees	1894	September 1895	
4		Carl Leo Mees	September 1895	1919	
acting (Note: White became acting president while president Mees was on a leave of absence.)		John White	1916	1917	
acting		John White	1919	1921	
5		Philip B. Woodworth	May 1921	May 1923	
acting		Frank C. Wagner	May 1923	Fall 1924	
6		Frank C. Wagner	Fall 1924	November 24, 1928	
acting		John B. Peddle	November 24, 1928	September 1, 1930	
7		Donald B. Prentice	February 1, 1931	June 1948	
acting		Carl Wischmeyer	June 1948	January 1949	
8		Ford L. Wilkinson	January 1949	September 1, 1958	
acting		Herman Moench	1958	August 31, 1959	
9		Ralph A. Morgen	September 1, 1959	August 31, 1961	
acting		Herman Moench	September 1, 1961	August 31, 1962	
10		John A. Logan	September 1, 1962	August 31, 1976	
Presidents of Rose–Hulman Institute of Technology (1971–present)
11		Samuel Hulbert	September 1, 1976	June 1, 2004	
12		John J. Midgley	July 1, 2004	June 30, 2005	
interim		Robert Bright (Note: Chair of the Board of Directors.)	July 1, 2005	June 30, 2006	
13		Gerald Jakubowski	July 1, 2006	June 30, 2009 (Note: Resigned for a position at the California Maritime Academy.)	
interim		Matt Branam	July 1, 2009	December 3, 2009	
14		Matt Branam	December 4, 2009	April 20, 2012	
interim		Robert A. Coons	April 21, 2012	April 30, 2013	
15		James C. Conwell	May 1, 2013	November 14, 2018	
16		Robert A. Coons	November 15, 2018	present	

Table notes:

== See also ==
- Association of Independent Technological Universities
