= Zoltan Sepeshy =

American painter

- Born: 1898; Kassa, Hungary (now Košice, Slovakia)
- Died: 1974 (aged 75–76); Royal Oak, Michigan, U.S.
- Occupation: Painter

Zoltan Sepeshy (1898–1974) was a Hungarian-born American painter. He was trained in Budapest and Vienna, and he emigrated to the United States in 1921. He taught at the Cranbrook Academy of Art in Bloomfield Hills, Michigan, and he was its second director. His work is in the permanent collections of the Smithsonian American Art Museum and the Cranbrook Art Museum.
