= Cynthia Bouron =

American showgirl and actress (1934–1973)

- Born: Cynthia Krensky; September 24, 1934; New York City, United States
- Died: c. October 20, 1973 (aged 39); Los Angeles, California
- Cause of death: Bludgeoning
- Body discovered: Studio City, California
- Occupations: Showgirl, actress
- Years active: 1960-1973
- Known for: 1970 paternity suit against Cary Grant
- Spouse: Milos Milos (m. 1964; died 1966)
- Children: 3
- Parent(s): Morris and Ida Krensky

Cynthia L. Krensky Bouron, also known as Samantha Lou Bouron (September 24, 1934 – c. October 20, 1973) was an American showgirl and actress, who gained notoriety in the late 1960s for her affairs with several Hollywood stars and paternity suit against Cary Grant. She was married to actor Milos Milos from 1964 to 1966, when he apparently committed suicide after murdering Barbara Thomason Rooney, the estranged wife of actor Mickey Rooney. On October 30, 1973, she was discovered murdered in the trunk of a car parked outside of a Market Basket grocery store and the murderer was never found.

== Biography ==
Cynthia L. Krensky was born in New York to Morris and Ida Krensky. She married twice, the first time to Robert Bouron, a Parisian dentist, and the second time to actor Milos Milos and had a son by each husband.

Living in Hollywood, California, she was identified at various times as a writer, a studio production employee, an actress and producer. She also hosted a call-in talk show at KPLM-TV in Palm Springs.

=== Paternity suit ===
Bouron plotted against Grant and became pregnant by a younger man resembling Grant in his younger years. When the child, Stephanie Andrea, was born on March 12, 1970, Bouron wrote Grant's name on the birth certificate. She sued Cary Grant over the paternity of her daughter, alleging he was the father. When Grant challenged her to a blood test to prove that he wasn't the father, Bouron failed to comply three times and the case was dropped, and she was ordered to remove Grant's name from the birth certificate.

== Death ==
On October 30, 1973, Bouron was found dead in the trunk of a car parked outside the Market Basket grocery store, located at 11315 Ventura Boulevard in Studio City, California. She had been tied up and beaten to death. She lay undiscovered for at least a week. Bouron was reported missing by her two sons on October 20. The automobile where her body was discovered had been abandoned since October 24. The murderer was never found. She was 39 at the time of her death.
