= Milos Milos =

Serbian actor, stunt double, bodyguard, and murderer (1941–1966)

- Милош Милош
- Born: Miloš Milošević; 1 July 1941; Knjaževac, German-occupied Serbia
- Died: 30 January 1966 (aged 24); Los Angeles, California, US
- Cause of death: Suicide by gunshot
- Occupations: Actor; stunt double; bodyguard
- Years active: 1964–1966
- Spouse: Cynthia Bouron (m. 1964)
- Children: 1
- Criminal information
- Status: Deceased

Details
- Victims: Barbara Ann Thomason
- Date: January 30, 1966
- Killed: 1
- Weapon: Chrome-plated .38 Special revolver

Milos Milos (Serbian: Милош Милош; né Miloš Milošević; 1 July 1941 – 30 January 1966) was a Serbian actor, stunt double, bodyguard, and murderer. He was the bodyguard for the actor Alain Delon. He committed suicide in 1966 after murdering his lover Barbara Ann Thomason, who was the wife of actor Mickey Rooney and was having an affair with Milos.

== Early life ==
Milos was born Miloš Milošević (Serbian: Милош Милошевић) on 1 July 1941 in Knjaževac, German-occupied Serbia (present-day Serbia) to an influential family. His grandfather was the mayor of Knjaževac and his father was chairman of the Guild of Exporters of Yugoslavia. Milos' family suffered under the Communist authorities and most of their private properties were confiscated. In 1957, Milosevic moved to live with his mother to Belgrade.

== Career ==
In 1962, he met Alain Delon, who was filming Marco Polo, an eventually cancelled film, in Belgrade. Delon hired Milošević as his stunt double and took him with him to Paris. In 1964, Milos married Cynthia Bouron, to whom Delon introduced him, and left first for New York and a little later for Hollywood.

As a young Hollywood actor, Milos is best known for his performance as a Soviet naval officer in the 1966 comedy The Russians Are Coming, the Russians Are Coming, as well as for playing the title role in the same year's Esperanto horror film Incubus. Both films were released after his suicide in January 1966.

== Personal life and death ==
Milos was married to Cynthia Bouron from 1964 to 1966; they had one child.

In 1965, Milos began an affair with actress Barbara Ann Thomason (stage name Carolyn Mitchell) who was estranged from her husband Mickey Rooney. Milos and Thomason were found dead in Rooney's Los Angeles house in 1966. The official inquiry found that Milos had shot Thomason with Rooney's chrome-plated .38 caliber revolver and then committed suicide. The official inquiry provoked rumors that Milos and Thomason were both murdered in revenge for having an affair; however, Rooney was at St. John's Hospital in Santa Monica recovering from an infection that he caught on location in Manila during the filming of Ambush Bay.

== Filmography ==
Year	Title	Role	Notes
1966	The Russians Are Coming, the Russians Are Coming	Lysenko	Released posthumously
1966	Incubus	Incubus	Released posthumously (final film role)
