= Geoffrey Wansell =

British journalist, author and podcaster

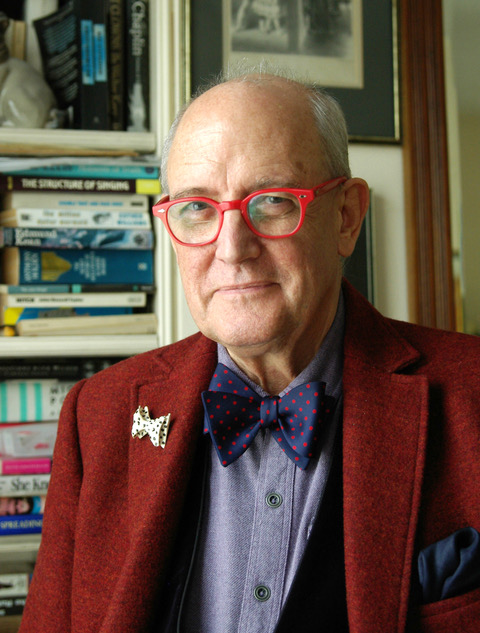
- Geoffrey Wansell in his London home
- Born: 9 July 1945 (age 80); Greenock, Scotland
- Occupations: Journalist; author; podcaster
- Notable work: The Bus Stop Killer; Terence Rattigan: A Biography; Lifers

Geoffrey Wansell (born 9 July 1945) is a British journalist, author and podcaster. He has written biographies and works of true crime, and co-hosts the podcast Blood Ties.

== Career ==
Wansell has worked as a journalist for newspapers including The Times, The Observer, The Daily Telegraph and the Daily Mail, where he is crime and thriller reviewer. Writing in The Telegraph about Fred West, Wansell questions, "If all his evil secrets will ever be uncovered?". The Independent describes Wansell's article on Fred West as a, "masterpiece of self-serving hypocrisy".

Geoffrey Wansell has written biographies such as Cary Grant: Haunted Idol (1983), appearing on BBC Radio 4, Wansell commented on Cary Grant's acting career that, "It's not until "Sylvia Scarlett" with Katharine Hepburn you begin to see the Grant persona emerge". Other biographies include, Tycoon: The Life of James Goldsmith (1987) and Terence Rattigan: A Biography (1995), the last of which was shortlisted for the Whitbread Prize. His true crime books include An Evil Love (1996), on Fred and Rose West, The Bus Stop Killer (2011), about Levi Bellfield, and Lifers: Inside the Minds of Britain's Most Notorious Criminals (2016).

The Independent reported that Wansell had exclusive use of Fred West's, "13 volumes of police transcripts of interviews with West" for his book "An Evil Love: The Life and Crimes of Fred West".

In 2013, he co-wrote Poirot and Me with actor David Suchet.

== Podcasting ==
Wansell co-hosts the weekly true crime podcast Blood Ties with his daughter, Molly Wansell and produced by Peter Shevlin. The series discusses high-profile murder cases and the psychology of offenders. In 2025, Feedspot rated it as 15th in their top 50 UK crime podcasts.

== Selected bibliography ==
- Cary Grant: Haunted Idol (1983)
- Tycoon: The Life of James Goldsmith (1987)
- Terence Rattigan: A Biography (1995)
- An Evil Love (1996)
- The Bus Stop Killer (2011)
- Poirot and Me (with David Suchet, 2013)
- Lifers: Inside the Minds of Britain's Most Notorious Criminals (2016)
