= Market Basket (California) =

American supermarket chain

Market Basket was the name used by two separate chains of supermarkets within Southern California. The first chain originated in Pasadena and operated from 1930 until 1982. The second chain operated from 1989 until 1994.

== Kroger-associated chain (1930–1982) ==
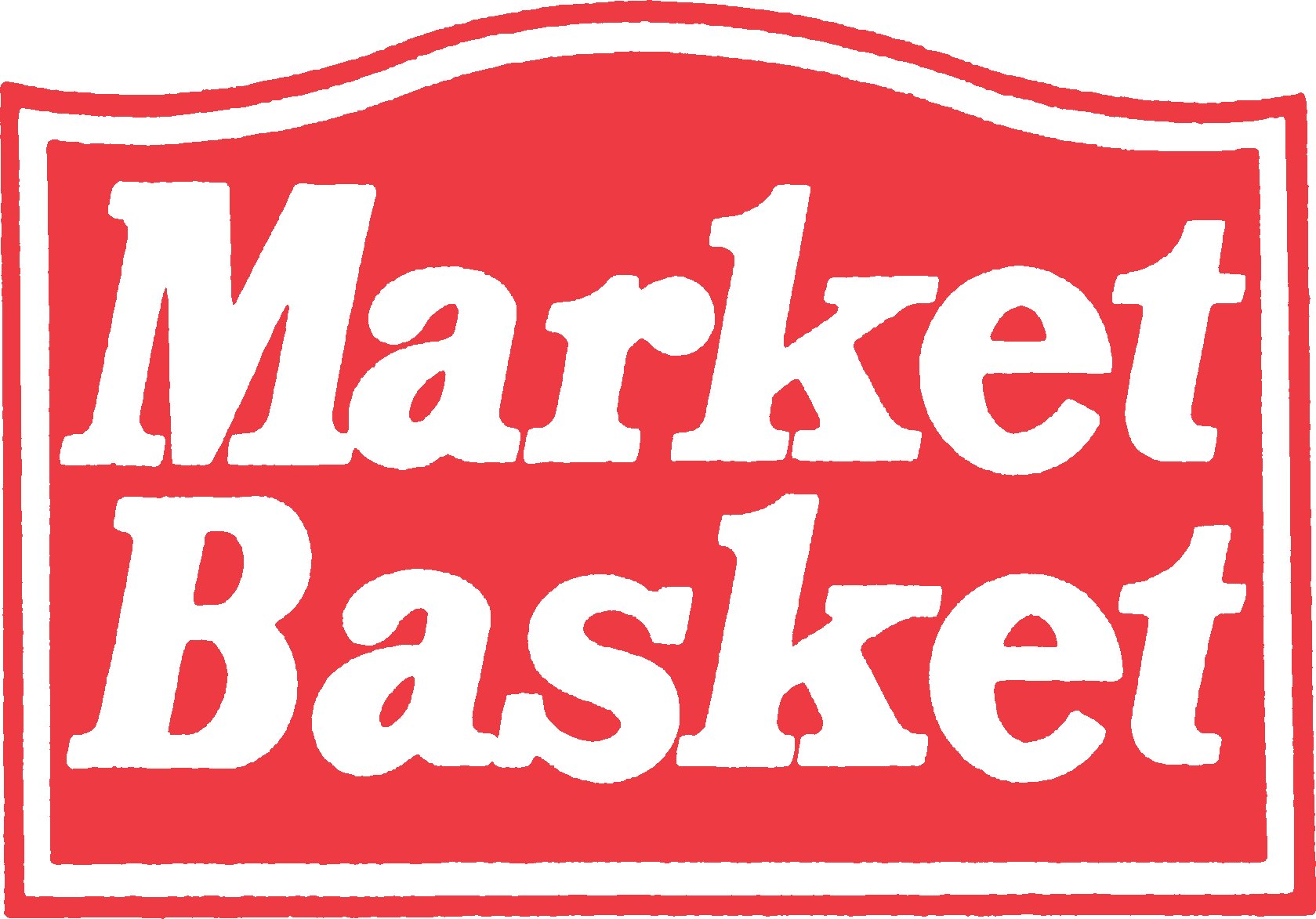
Market Basket final logo

The first store opened in Pasadena on Colorado Boulevard at Meredith in 1930. The chain had 14 stores in the Pasadena area by 1934. The chain had 42 locations in 1959 including as far as Santa Ana and San Bernardino. Kroger bought the chain in 1963 when Market Basket annual sales were $121 million (~$974 million in 2025).

In 1982, Kroger decided to exit the competitive Southern California supermarket business and broke up the 65 store Market Basket chain by selling many of stores to Ralphs, Boys, Albertsons, Hughes and Vons while closing the rest. At that time, the Market Basket name was retired while Kroger kept the rights to the Market Basket brand within California.

== Boys–Yucaipa-associated chain (1989–1994) ==
In 1989, Boys Markets "paid a small fee" to Kroger for the rights to use the Market Basket name within Southern California and rebranded 17 stores in the suburbs as Market Basket. Yucaipa acquired Boys a few weeks later.

By 1991 the stores were part of Food 4 Less, owned by Yucaipa Co. The Market Basket brand was finally retired after Yucaipa acquired Ralphs in 1994 and the various chain were consolidated into the better known Ralphs or Food 4 Less banners. Ironically, Kroger would acquire Ralphs (and its parent company, Fred Meyer) in 1998, re-entering Southern California.

== In popular culture ==
Jerry Lewis plays a stock clerk upon whom a stack of Hi-C cans falls in the Market Basket supermarket at 11315 Ventura Boulevard, Studio City, Los Angeles, in the 1964 film The Disorderly Orderly.
