= List of Cary Grant performances =

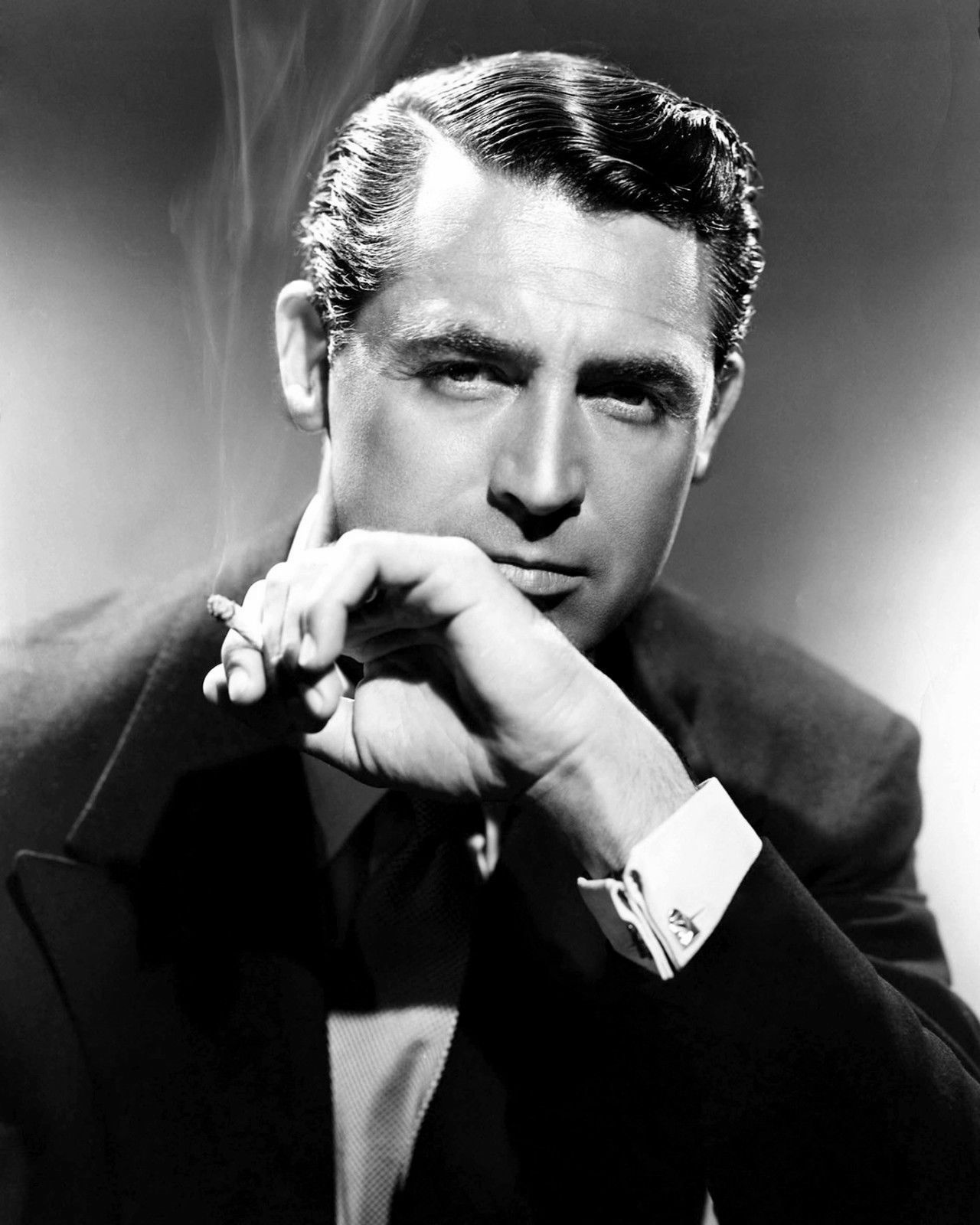
Grant in the 1940s

Cary Grant (January 18, 1904 – November 29, 1986) was a British actor, known as one of classic Hollywood's definitive leading men. He was known for his naturally acquired transatlantic accent, debonair demeanor, light-hearted persona, and sense of comic timing. Grant acted in at least 76 films between 1932 and 1966. In 1999, the American Film Institute named Grant the second-greatest male star of Golden Age Hollywood cinema (after Humphrey Bogart).

Grant first began acting in Broadway plays in the 1920s, going by his birth name Archie Leach. He made his film debut with a minor role in This Is the Night (1932). Beginning in the 1930s, Grant appeared in over 20 radio programs, usually Lux Radio Theatre.

In 1940, Grant appeared opposite Rosalind Russell in His Girl Friday. Grant was nominated twice for the Academy Award for Best Actor in Penny Serenade (1941) and None but the Lonely Heart (1944). He portrayed composer and songwriter Cole Porter in Night and Day (1946). In 1955, he acted alongside Grace Kelly in the Alfred Hitchcock-directed To Catch a Thief. He appeared in Houseboat (1958) with Sophia Loren. That year he also appeared in Indiscreet with Ingrid Bergman, for which he was nominated for a Golden Globe Award for Best Actor. In 1959, Grant starred alongside Eva Marie Saint in the Alfred Hitchcock-directed North by Northwest. His next role was alongside Doris Day in That Touch of Mink (1962). His performance opposite Audrey Hepburn in Charade (1963) garnered him a nomination for the BAFTA Award for Best Actor in a Leading Role. Grant's final film was Walk, Don't Run (1966), retiring to raise his newborn daughter. He died twenty years later in 1986.

== Filmography ==
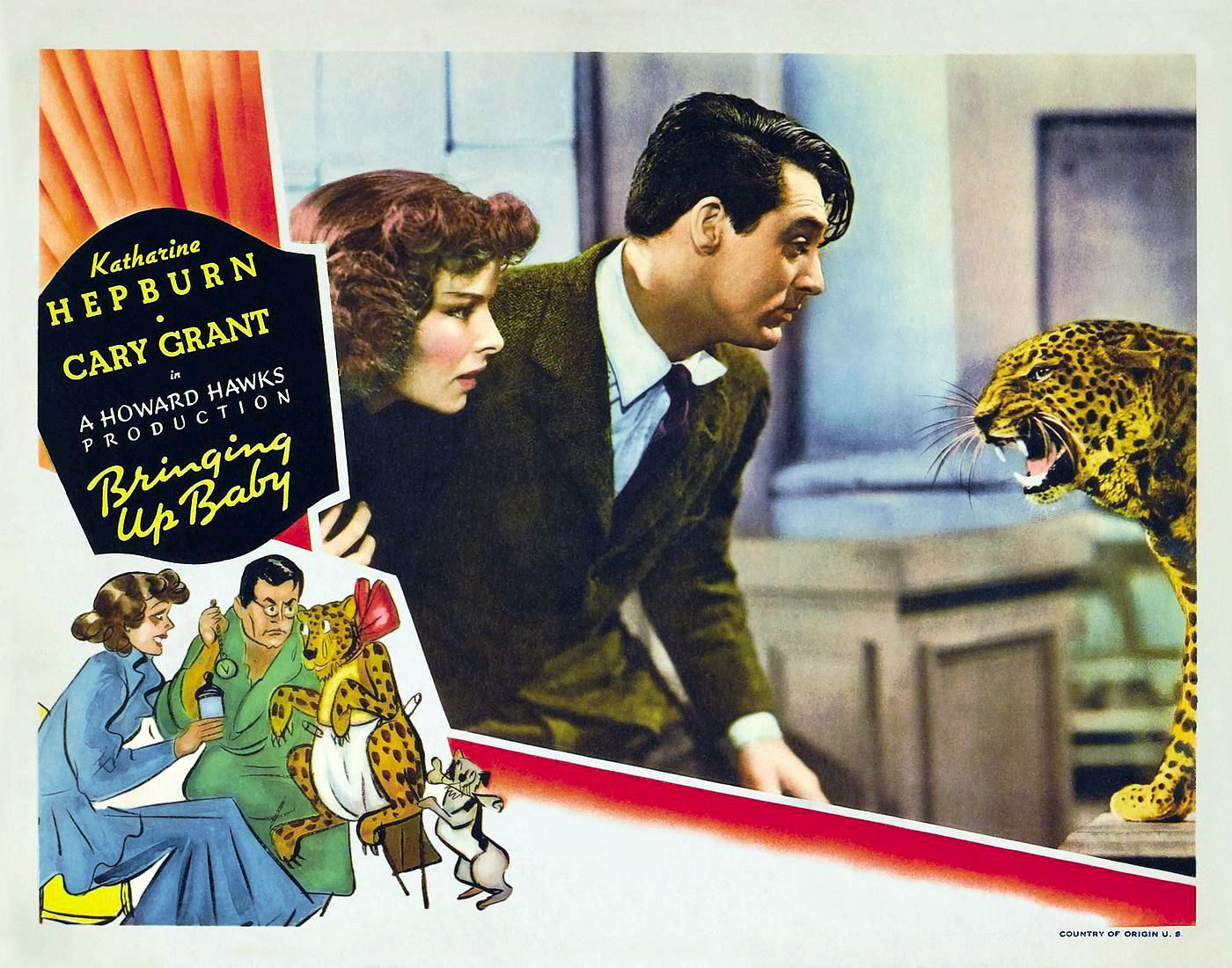
Grant and Katharine Hepburn on a poster for Bringing Up Baby (1938)

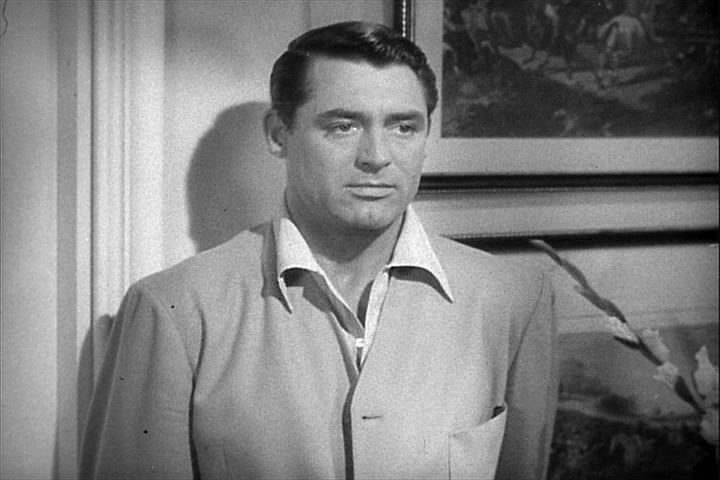
Trailer shot from The Philadelphia Story (1940)

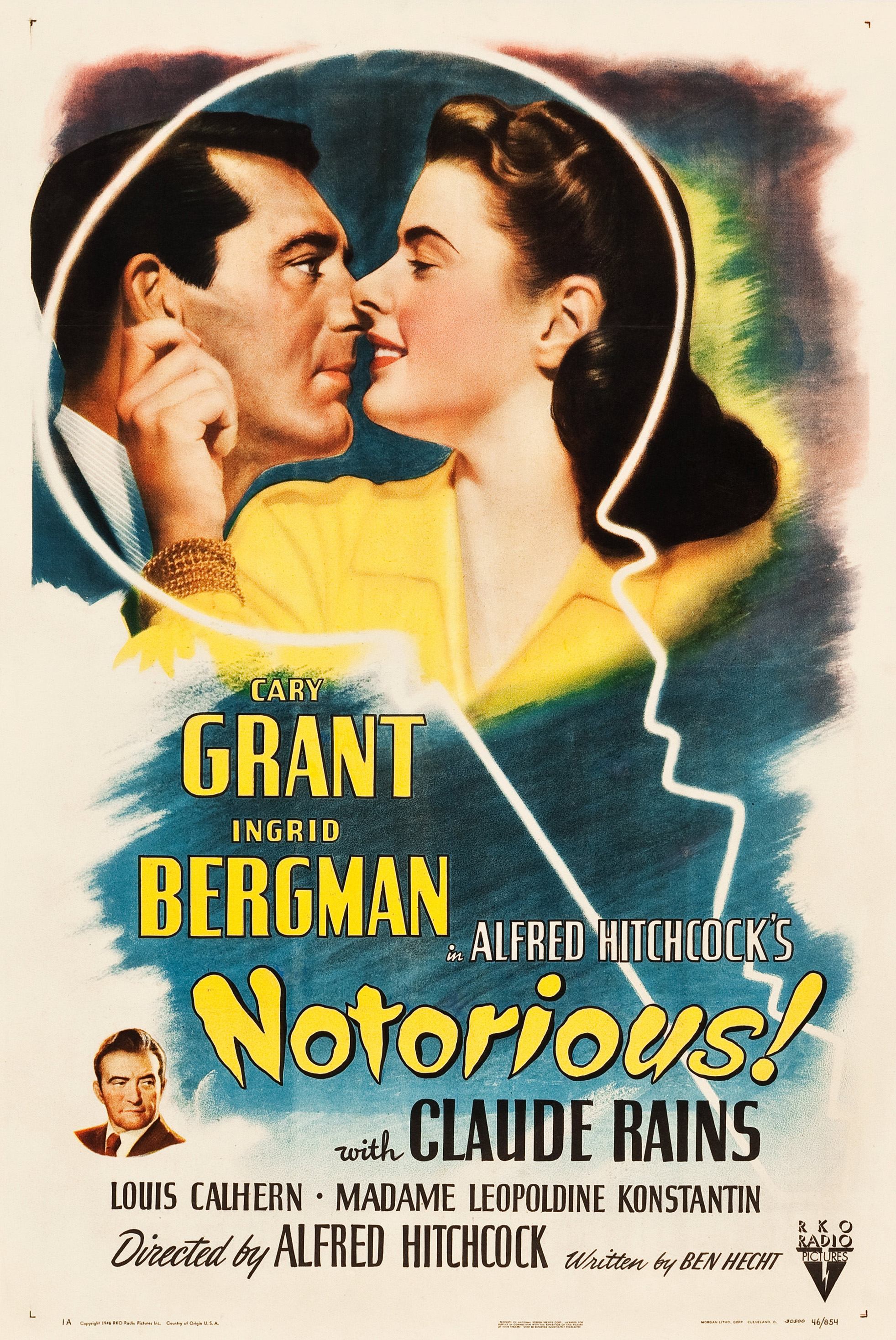
Grant and Ingrid Bergman on a poster for Notorious (1946)

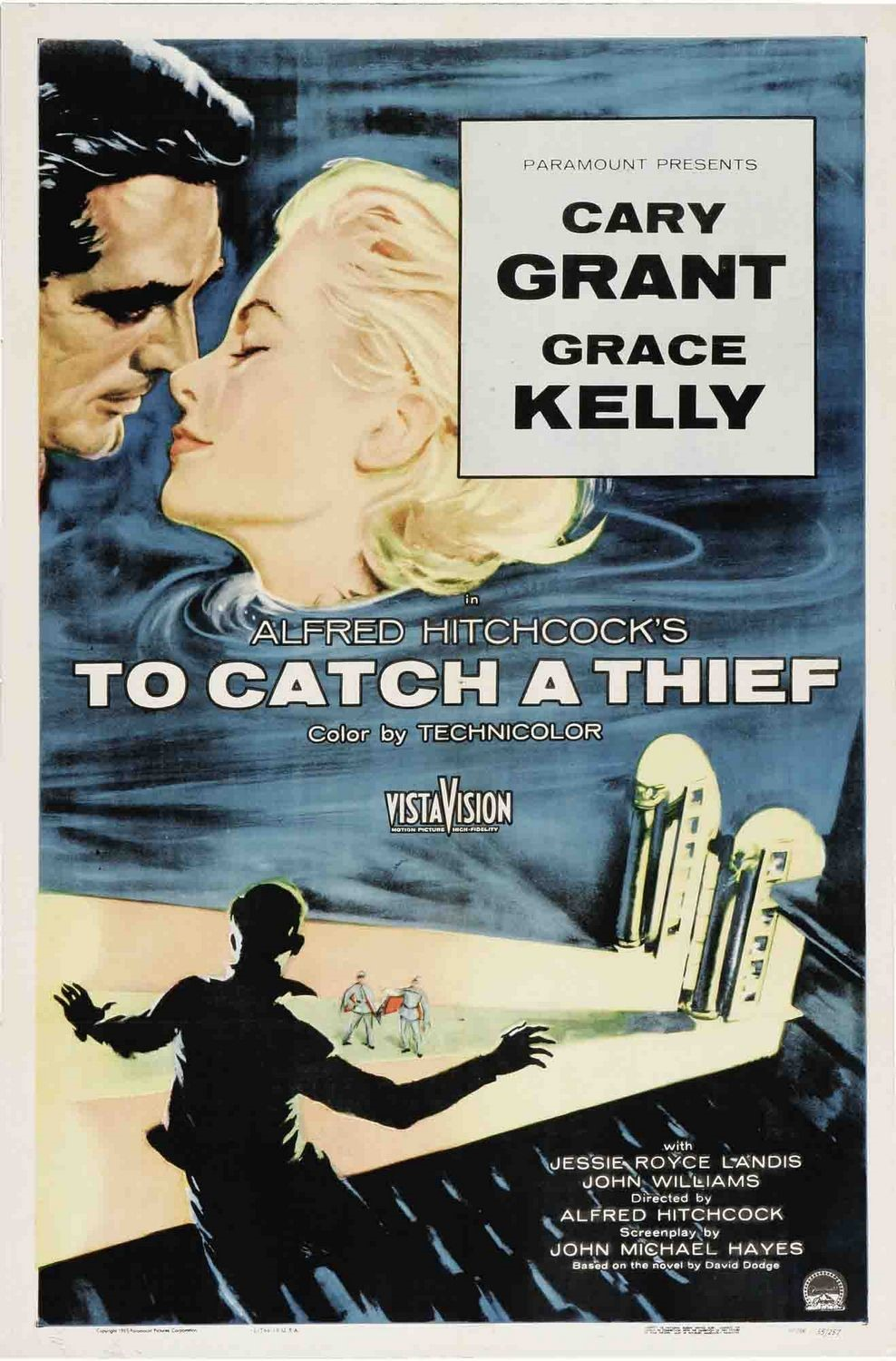
Grant and Grace Kelly on a poster for To Catch a Thief (1955)

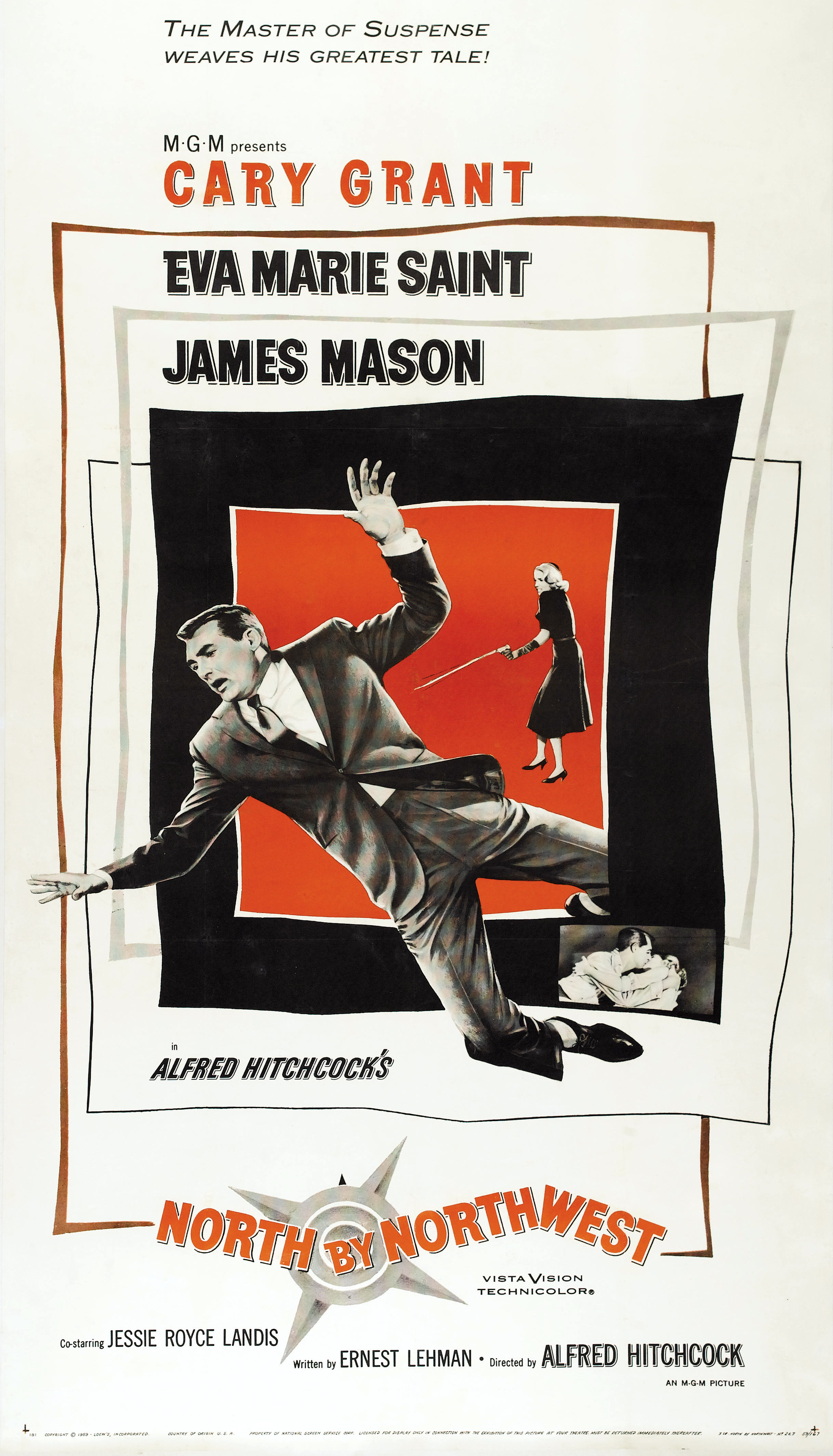
Grant on a poster for North by Northwest (1959)

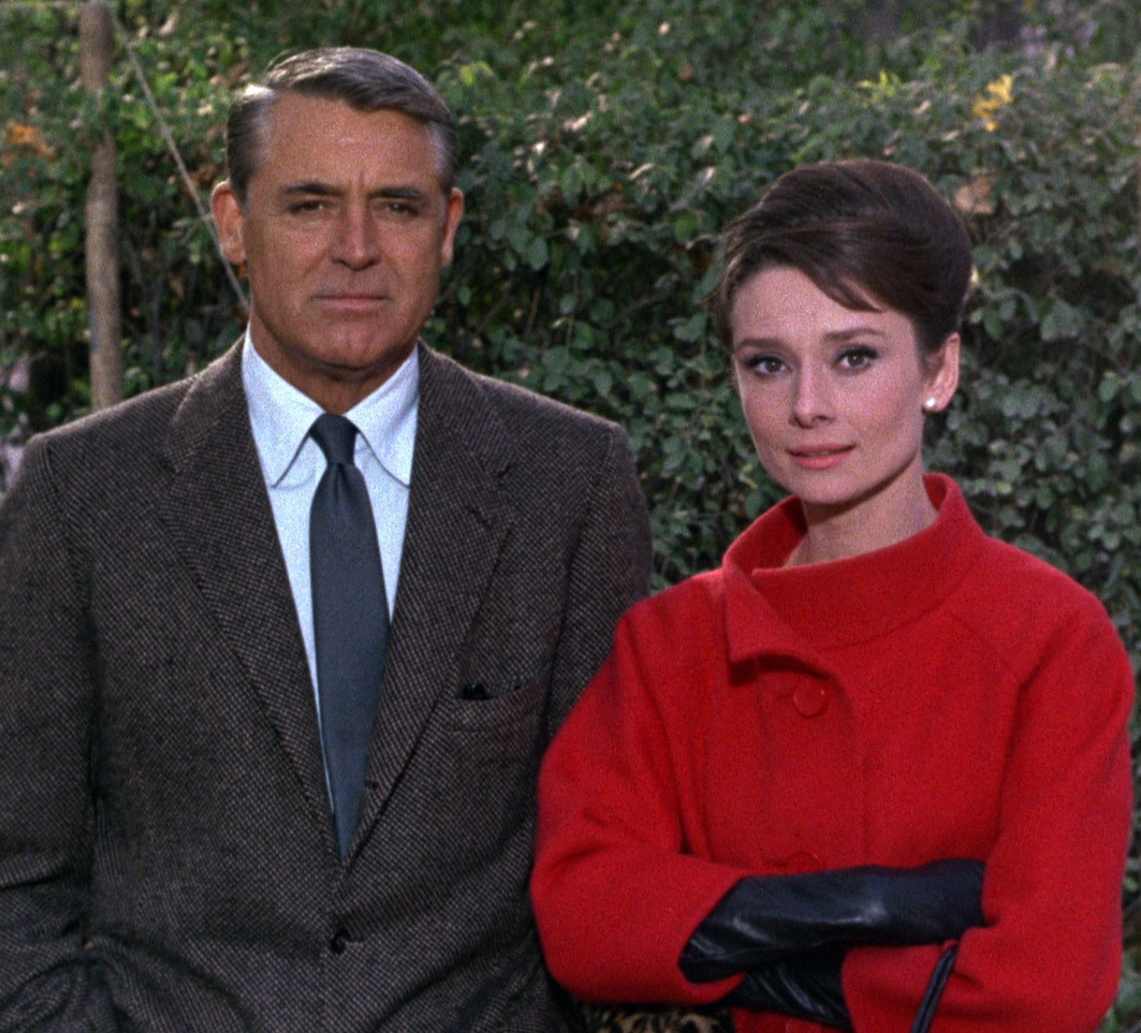
Grant and Audrey Hepburn in Charade (1963)

Year	Title	Role	Notes	Ref.
1932	This Is the Night	Stephen Mathewson	Film debut	
1932	Devil and the Deep	Lieutenant Jaeckel		
1932	Sinners in the Sun	Ridgeway		
1932	Merrily We Go to Hell	Charlie Baxter	UK title: Merrily We Go to _____	
1932	Singapore Sue	First Sailor (uncredited)	Short film	
1932	Blonde Venus	Nick Townsend		
1932	Hot Saturday	Romer Sheffield		
1932	Madame Butterfly	Lieutenant B.F. Pinkerton		
1933	She Done Him Wrong	Capt. Cummings		
1933	The Woman Accused	Jeffrey Baxter		
1933	The Eagle and the Hawk	Henry Crocker		
1933	Gambling Ship	Ace Corbin		
1933	I'm No Angel	Jack Clayton		
1933	Alice in Wonderland	The Mock Turtle		
1934	Thirty-Day Princess	Porter Madison III		
1934	Born to Be Bad	Malcolm Trevor		
1934	Kiss and Make-Up	Dr. Maurice Lamar		
1934	Ladies Should Listen	Julian De Lussac		
1935	Enter Madame	Gerald Fitzgerald		
1935	Wings in the Dark	Ken Gordon		
1935	The Last Outpost	Michael Andrews		
1935	Sylvia Scarlett	Jimmy Monkley		
1936	Big Brown Eyes	Det. Sgt. Danny Barr		
1936	Suzy	Andre Charville		
1936	The Amazing Quest of Ernest Bliss	Ernest Bliss	Alternative titles: Romance and Riches; The Amazing Adventure	
1936	Wedding Present	Charlie Mason		
1937	When You're in Love	Jimmy Hudson	UK title: For You Alone	
1937	Topper	George Kerby		
1937	The Toast of New York	Nicholas "Nick" Boyd		
1937	The Awful Truth	Jerry Warriner		
1938	Bringing Up Baby	Dr. David Huxley		
1938	Holiday	John "Johnny" Case		
1939	Gunga Din	Sgt. Archibald Cutter		
1939	Only Angels Have Wings	Geoff Carter		
1939	In Name Only	Alec Walker		
1940	His Girl Friday	Walter Burns		
1940	My Favorite Wife	Nick		
1940	The Howards of Virginia	Matt Howard	UK title: The Tree of Liberty	
1940	The Philadelphia Story	C. K. Dexter Haven		
1941	Penny Serenade	Roger Adams	Nominated – Academy Award for Best Actor	
1941	Suspicion	Johnnie		
1942	The Talk of the Town	Leopold Dilg a.k.a. Joseph		
1942	Once Upon a Honeymoon	Patrick "Pat" O'Toole		
1943	Mr. Lucky	Joe Adams/Joe Bascopolous		
1943	Destination Tokyo	Capt. Cassidy		
1944	Once Upon a Time	Jerry Flynn		
1944	Arsenic and Old Lace	Mortimer Brewster		
1944	None but the Lonely Heart	Ernie Mott	Nominated – Academy Award for Best Actor	
1946	Night and Day	Cole Porter		
1946	Notorious	T.R. Devlin		
1947	The Bachelor and the Bobby-Soxer	Dick Nugent	UK title: Bachelor Knight	
1947	The Bishop's Wife	Dudley		
1948	Mr. Blandings Builds His Dream House	Jim Blandings		
1948	Every Girl Should Be Married	Dr. Madison W. Brown		
1949	I Was a Male War Bride	Capt. Henri Rochard	UK title: You Can't Sleep Here	
1950	Crisis	Dr. Eugene Norland Ferguson		
1951	People Will Talk	Dr. Noah Praetorius		
1952	Room for One More	George "Poppy" Rose		
1952	Monkey Business	Dr. Barnaby Fulton		
1953	Dream Wife	Clemson Reade		
1955	To Catch a Thief	John Robie		
1957	An Affair to Remember	Nickie Ferrante		
1957	The Pride and the Passion	Anthony		
1957	Kiss Them for Me	Cmdr. Andy Crewson		
1958	Indiscreet	Philip Adams		
1958	Houseboat	Tom Winters		
1959	North by Northwest	Roger Thornhill		
1959	Operation Petticoat	Lt. Cmdr. Matt T. Sherman		
1960	The Grass Is Greener	Victor Rhyall, Earl		
1962	That Touch of Mink	Philip Shayne		
1963	Charade	Peter Joshua / Alexander Dyle / Adam Canfield / Brian Cruikshank		
1964	Father Goose	Walter Christopher Eckland		
1966	Walk, Don't Run	Sir William Rutland	Final film role	

== Theatre ==
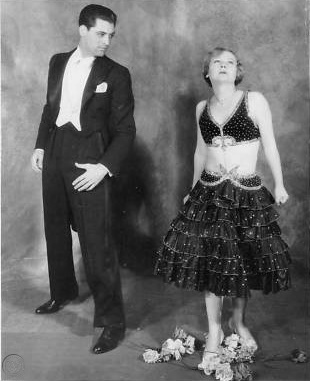
Cary Grant & Queenie Smith in the Shubert Organization's musical comedy play The Street Singer

Year	Title	Role	Location	Notes	Ref.
1922–1923	Better Times	–	Hippodrome Theatre	Performer	
1927–1928	Golden Dawn	Anzac	Hammerstein's Theatre		
1929	Boom Boom	Reggie Phipps	Casino Theatre		
1929–1930	A Wonderful Night	Max Grunewald	Majestic Theatre		
1930	The Street Singer				
1931	Nikki	Cary Lockwood	Longacre Theatre & George M. Cohan's Theatre		

== Radio ==
Year	Program	Episode	Ref.
1935	Lux Radio Theatre	Adam and Eva	
1937	Lux Radio Theatre	Madame Butterfly	
1938	Lux Radio Theatre	Theodora Goes Wild	
1939	Lux Radio Theatre	Only Angels Have Wings	
1939	Lux Radio Theatre	The Awful Truth	
1939	Lux Radio Theatre	In Name Only	
1941	Lux Radio Theatre	I Love You Again	
1942	Lux Radio Theatre	Here Comes Mr. Jordan	
1943	Lux Radio Theatre	The Talk of the Town	
1943	Suspense	The Black Curtain	
1943	Lux Radio Theatre	Mr. Lucky	
1944	Suspense	The Black Curtain	
1945	Lux Radio Theatre	Bedtime Story	
1946	Suspense	The Black Path of Fear	
1948	Suspense	The Last Chance	
1949	Lux Radio Theatre	The Bachelor and the Bobby-Soxer	
1949	Lux Radio Theatre	Every Girl Should Be Married	
1949	Lux Radio Theatre	Mr. Blandings Builds His Dream House	
1950	Lux Radio Theatre	Every Girl Should Be Married	
1950	Lux Radio Theatre	A Woman of Distinction	
1950	Suspense	On a Country Road	
1952	Lux Radio Theatre	Room for One More	
1953	Lux Radio Theatre	The Bishop's Wife	
1953	GE Playhouse	The Bachelor	
1953	Lux Radio Theatre	I Confess	
1954	Lux Radio Theatre	People Will Talk	
1954	Lux Radio Theatre	Welcome Stranger	
1955	Lux Radio Theatre	The Awful Truth	
1955	Lux Radio Theatre	The Bishop's Wife	

== Collaborations ==
=== Directors ===
He was a frequent collaborator with notable directors, such as Howard Hawks (Bringing Up Baby, Only Angels Have Wings, His Girl Friday, I Was a Male War Bride, Monkey Business), Alfred Hitchcock (Suspicion, Notorious, To Catch a Thief, North by Northwest), Stanley Donen (Kiss Them for Me, Indiscreet, Charade, The Grass Is Greener), George Cukor (Sylvia Scarlett, Holiday, The Philadelphia Story), Leo McCarey (The Awful Truth, Once Upon a Honeymoon, An Affair to Remember), and George Stevens (Gunga Din, Penny Serenade, The Talk of the Town). He also worked with Frank Capra, Stanley Kramer, Joseph L. Mankiewicz, Delbert Mann, Ralph Nelson, Clifford Odets, Sidney Sheldon, and Norman Taurog.

=== Actors ===
Actors with whom Grant worked include Edward Arnold, Richard Arlen, Lew Ayres, Noah Beery Jr., Ralph Bellamy, Jack Carson, James Coburn, Ronald Colman, Gary Cooper, Tony Curtis, Melvyn Douglas, Douglas Fairbanks Jr., Jose Ferrer, Barry Fitzgerald, John Garfield, James Gleason, Sir Cedric Hardwicke, Edward Everett Horton, Trevor Howard, Jim Hutton, George Kennedy, Martin Landau, Charles Laughton, Peter Lorre, Victor McLaglen, Fredric March, Herbert Marshall, James Mason, Raymond Massey, Walter Matthau, Robert Mitchum, Chester Morris, David Niven, Jack Oakie, Irving Pichel, Walter Pidgeon, Claude Rains, Gilbert Roland, Charles Ruggles, Randolph Scott, Frank Sinatra, James Stewart, Henry Travers, Monty Woolley, and Roland Young.

=== Actresses ===
Actresses with whom Grant worked include Jean Adair, Jean Arthur, Tallulah Bankhead, Ethel Barrymore, Constance Bennett, Joan Bennett, Ingrid Bergman, Leslie Caron, Doris Day, Marlene Dietrich, Betsy Drake, Irene Dunne, Samantha Eggar, Frances Farmer, Joan Fontaine, Kay Francis, Jean Harlow, Rita Hayworth, Audrey Hepburn, Katharine Hepburn, Josephine Hull, Grace Kelly, Deborah Kerr, Priscilla Lane, Elissa Landi, Carole Lombard, Sophia Loren, Myrna Loy, Helen Mack, Jayne Mansfield, Marilyn Monroe, Suzy Parker, Gail Patrick, Ginger Rogers, Rosalind Russell, Eva Marie Saint, Martha Scott, Ann Sheridan, Sylvia Sidney, Jean Simmons, Alexis Smith, Shirley Temple, Thelma Todd, Mae West, and Loretta Young.

== Accolades ==
Grant starred in ten films selected by the Library of Congress for preservation in the National Film Registry as being "culturally, historically or aesthetically significant"; She Done Him Wrong (1933), The Awful Truth (1937), Bringing Up Baby (1938), Gunga Din (1939), Only Angels Have Wings (1939), The Philadelphia Story (1940), His Girl Friday (1940), Notorious (1946), North by Northwest (1959) and Charade (1963).
