= Asian immigration to the United States =

Asian immigration to the United States refers to immigration to the United States from part of the continent of Asia, which includes Central Asia, East Asia, South Asia, and Southeast Asia. Asian-origin populations have historically been in the territory that would eventually become the United States since the 16th century. The first major wave of Asian immigration occurred in the late 19th century, primarily in Hawaii and the West Coast. Asian Americans experienced exclusion, and limitations to immigration, by the United States law between 1875 and 1965, and were largely prohibited from naturalization until the 1940s. Since the elimination of Asian exclusion laws and the reform of the immigration system in the Immigration and Nationality Act of 1965, there has been a large increase in the number of immigrants to the United States from Asia.

== History ==
=== Early immigration (before 1830s) ===
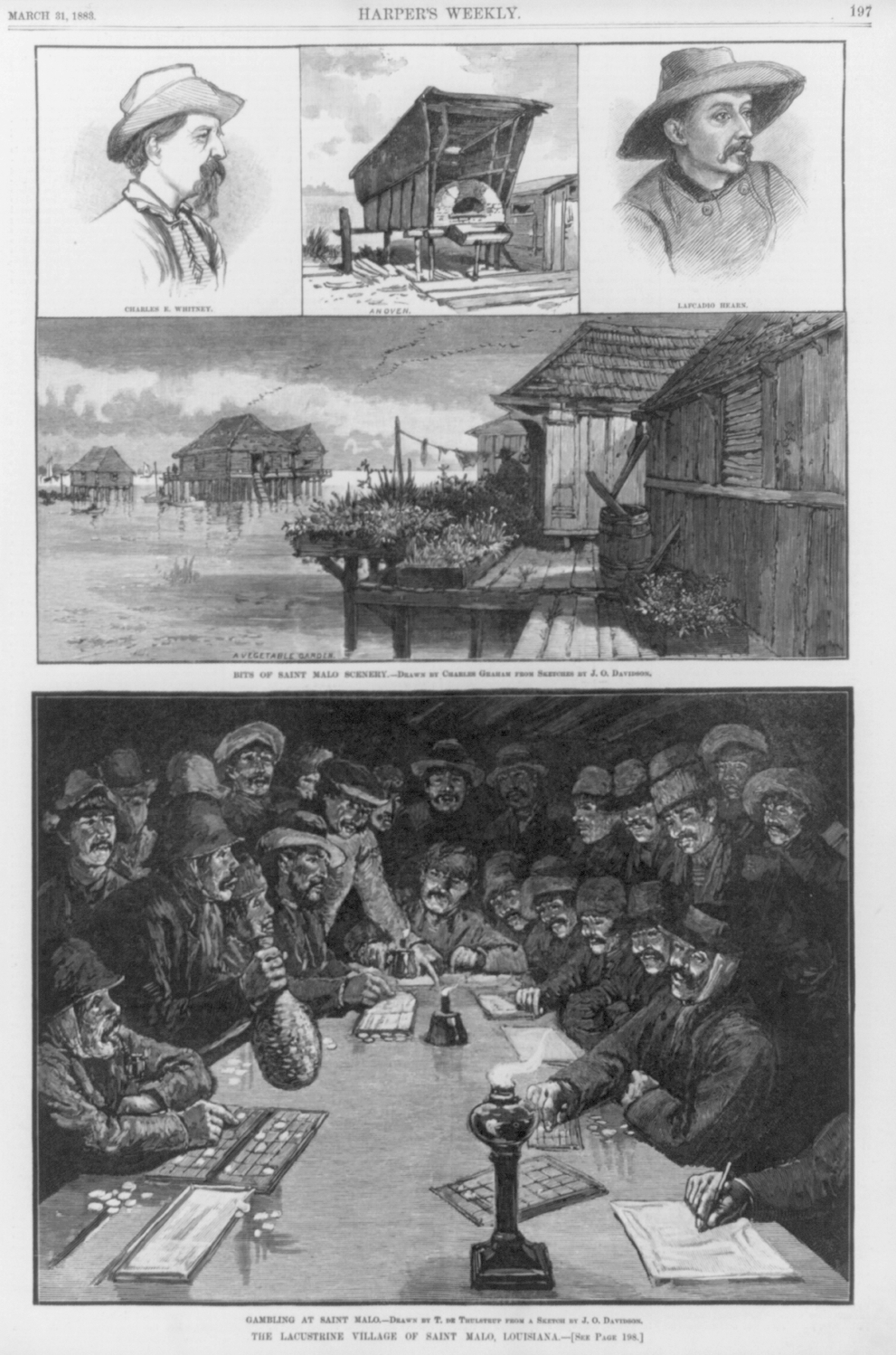
Images from a Harper's Magazine article on "the Lacustrine village" of Saint Malo, Louisiana, where Filipino migrants settled in the 18th century.

The first Asian-origin people known to arrive in North America after the beginning of the European colonization were a group of Filipinos known as "Luzonians" or Luzon Indians. These Luzonians were part of the crew and landing party of the Spanish galleon Nuestra Señora de Buena Esperanza. The ship set sail from Manila and landed in Morro Bay in what is now the California Coast on 17 October 1587 as part of the Galleon Trade between the Spanish East Indies (the colonial name for what would become the Philippines) and New Spain (Spain's colonies in North America). More Filipino sailors arrived along the California Coast when both places were part of the Spanish Empire. By 1763, "Manila men" or "Tagalas" had established a settlement called St. Malo on the outskirts of New Orleans, Louisiana. Indians have been documented in Colonial America as early as 1775. With the establishment of the Old China Trade in the late 18th century, a handful of Chinese merchants were recorded as residing in the United States by 1815.

=== First major wave of Asian immigration (1850–1917) ===
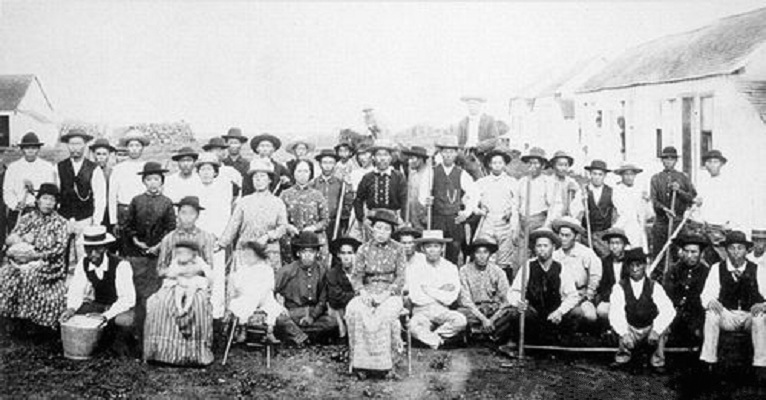
Early Japanese immigrants to Hawaii.

By the 1830s, East Asian and Southeast Asian groups had begun immigrating to Hawaii, where American capitalists and missionaries had established plantations and settlements. Originating primarily from China, Japan, Korea, and the Philippines, these early migrants were predominantly contract workers who labored on plantations. With the annexation of Hawaii by the United States in 1893, a large population of Asians lived in U.S. territory and more would continue to immigrate. As American capitalists established sugar cane plantations in Hawaii in the 19th century, they turned, through organizations such as the Royal Hawaiian Agricultural Society, to the Chinese as a source of cheap labor as early as the 1830s, with the first formal contract laborers arriving in 1852. Resistance from plantation laborers protesting low wages and tensions between various native and immigrant groups encouraged plantation owners to import more labor from different Asian countries to keep wages low. Between 1885 and 1924, "some 30,000 Japanese had gone to [Hawaii] as kan'yaku imin, or government-sponsored contract laborers." Between 1894 and 1924, roughly 170,000 Japanese immigrants went to Hawaii as private contract laborers, family members of existing immigrants, and merchants. Taking refuge from Japanese imperialism and growing poverty and famine in Korea, and encouraged by Christian missionaries, thousands of Koreans migrated to Hawaii in the early 1900s. Filipinos, who were American colonial subjects after 1898, migrated by the "tens of thousands" to Hawaii in the early 1900s.

The first major wave of Asian immigration to the continental United States occurred primarily on the West Coast during the California Gold Rush, starting in the 1850s. Whereas, Chinese immigrants numbered less than 400 in 1848 and 25,000 by 1852. Most Chinese immigrants in California, which they called Gam Saan ("Gold Mountain"), were also from the Guangdong province; they sought sanctuary from conflicts such as the Opium Wars and ensuing economic instability, and hoped to earn wealth to send back to their families. As in Hawaii, many capitalists in California and elsewhere (including as far as North Adams, Massachusetts) sought Asian immigrants to fill an increasing demand for labor in gold mines, factories, and on the Transcontinental Railroad. Some plantation owners in the South sought Chinese labor as a cheap means to replace the free labor of slavery. Chinese laborers generally arrived in California with the help of brokers in Hong Kong and other ports under the credit-ticket system, where they would pay back money loaned from brokers with their wages upon arrival. In addition to laborers, merchants also migrated from China, opening businesses and stores, including those that would form the beginnings of China towns.

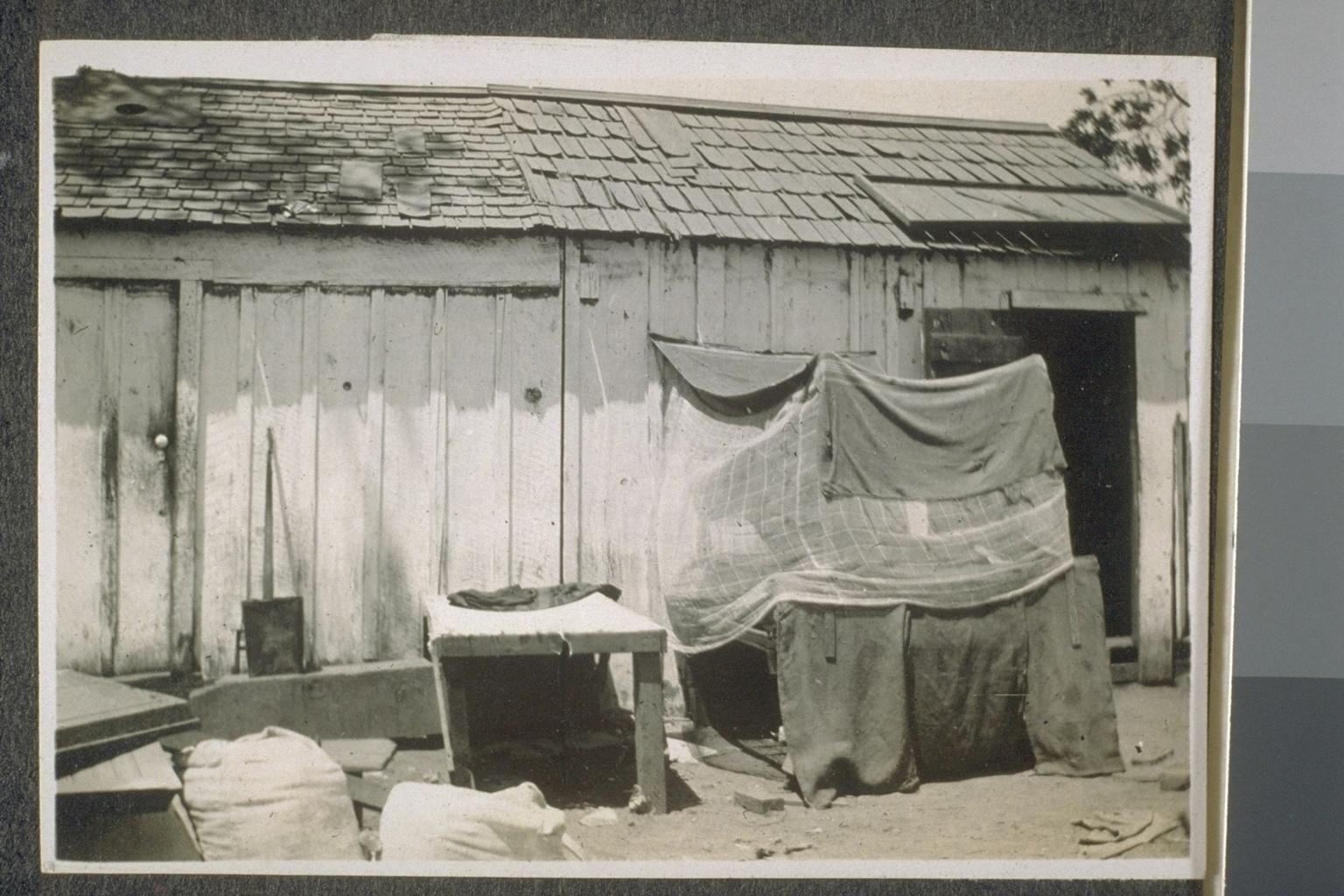
Makeshift shelter for Indian farm laborers (referred to as a "Hindu bed") in California.

Japanese, Korean, and South Asian immigrants also arrived in the continental United States starting from the late 1800s and onwards to fill demands for labor. Japanese immigrants were primarily farmers facing economic upheaval during the Meiji Restoration; they began to migrate in large numbers to the continental United States (having already been migrating to Hawaii since 1885) in the 1890s, after the Chinese exclusion (see below). By 1924, 180,000 Japanese immigrants had gone to the mainland. Filipino migration to North America continued in this period with reports of "Manila men" in early gold camps in Mariposa County, California in the late 1840s. The 1880 census counted 105,465 Chinese and 145 Japanese, indicating that Asian immigration to the continent by this point consisted primarily of Chinese immigrants, overwhelmingly present in California.

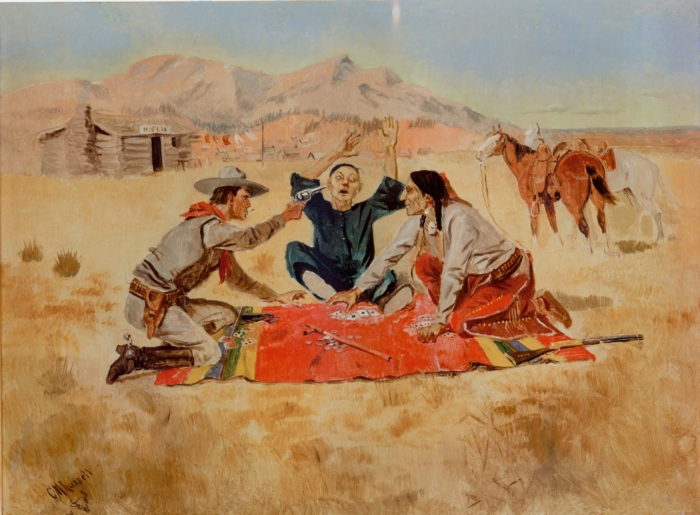
An 1894 painting entitled "Not a Chinaman's Chance" by white American artist Charles Marion Russell, which depicted violence in the American West against Chinese immigrants.

In the 1860s and 1870s, nativist hostility to the presence of Asian laborers in the continental United States grew and intensified, with the formation of organizations such as the Asiatic Exclusion League. East Asian immigrants, particularly Chinese Americans who composed the majority of the population on the mainland, were seen as the "yellow peril" and suffered violence and discrimination. Lynchings of Chinese were common and a large-scale of attacks also occurred. The most prominent act of violence at the time was the Rock Springs massacre, in which a mob of white miners killed nearly 30 Chinese immigrants because they were accused of taking the white miners' jobs. In 1875, Congress passed the Page Act, the first restrictive immigration law. This law recognized forced laborers from Asia as well as Asian women who would potentially engage in prostitution as "undesirable" people, who would henceforth be barred from entering the United States. In practice, the law was enforced to institute a near-complete exclusion of Chinese women from the United States, preventing male laborers from bringing their families with or after them.

The Chinese Exclusion Act of 1882 prohibited virtually all immigration from China, the first immigration law to do so on the basis of race or national origin. Minor exceptions were made for select merchants, diplomats, and students. The law also prevented Chinese immigrants from naturalizing as U.S. citizens. The Geary Act of 1892 further "required Chinese to register and secure a certificate as proof of their right to be in the United States" if they sought to leave and reenter the United States, with imprisonment or deportation as potential penalties. Although racial discrimination intensified in the exclusion era, Chinese immigrants fought to defend their existing rights and continued to pursue voting rights and citizenship. The children of Chinese immigrants began to develop "a sense of themselves as having a distinct identity as Chinese Americans." In 1898, in the case United States v. Wong Kim Ark, a Chinese American, who had been born in San Francisco, was initially denied re-entry in the United States was found to be a U.S. citizen; this decision established an important precedent in its interpretation of the Citizenship Clause of the Fourteenth Amendment to the Constitution.

Initially, Japanese and South Asian laborers filled the demand that could not be met by new Chinese immigrants. The 1900 census counted 24,326 Japanese residents, a sharp increase, and 89,863 Chinese residents. The first South Asian immigrants landed in the United States in 1907, and were predominantly Punjabi Sikh farmers. As immigration restrictions specific to South Asians would begin two years later and against Asians generally eight years after that, "[a]ltogether only sixty-four hundred came to America" during this period. Like the Chinese and Japanese immigrants of the time, these South Asians were predominantly men. South Asian migrants also arrived on the East Coast, although to a lesser extent in the late 19th and early 20th centuries, predominantly Bengali Muslims who worked as craftsmen and merchants, selling 'exotic' goods such as embroidered silks and rugs. The 1910 census, the first to count South Asians, recorded that there were 2,545 "Hindus" in the United States.

Anti-Asian hostility against these both older and newer Asian immigrant groups continued, becoming explosive in events such as the Pacific Coast race riots of 1907 in San Francisco, California; Bellingham, Washington; and Vancouver, British Columbia, Canada. The San Francisco riot was led by anti-Japanese activist, rebelling with violence in order to receive segregated schools for Caucasian and Japanese students. In the Bellingham riots, a mob of 400–500 white men attacked the homes of hundreds of South Asian immigrants, beating them and driving them out of town, with over 400 South Asians held in "protective custody" by local authorities. Along with geopolitical factors, these events encourage the United States to pursue the 1907 Gentleman's Agreement with Japan, wherein the Japanese government agreed to prohibit emigration to the United States and the latter's government agreed to impose less restrictions on Japanese immigrants. In practice, this meant that Japanese immigrants were barred unless they had previously acquired property or were immediate relatives of existing immigrants. While overall Japanese immigration was sharply curtailed, the family reunification provision allowed for the gender gap among Japanese Americans to be reduced significantly (including through "picture brides"). As Koreans were Japanese colonial subjects at the time and could be issued Japanese passports, many Korean women also immigrated as family members and "picture brides".

After the Spanish–American War ended with the Treaty of Paris in 1898, the United States replaced Spain as the colonial ruler of the Philippines. As Filipinos become colonial subjects of the United States, they also became US nationals. As American colonial subjects, Filipinos were considered US nationals and thus were not initially subject to exclusion laws. Many Filipinos came as agricultural laborers to fill demands once answered by Chinese and Japanese immigration, with migration patterns to Hawaii extending to the mainland starting from the 1920s. The US government also initially sponsored select Filipino students, known as pensionados, to attend US colleges and universities. However, in 1934, the Tydings–McDuffie Act, which promised independence to the Philippines by 1945, also sharply curtailed Filipino immigration with a quota of 50 immigrants per year.

=== Exclusion era ===
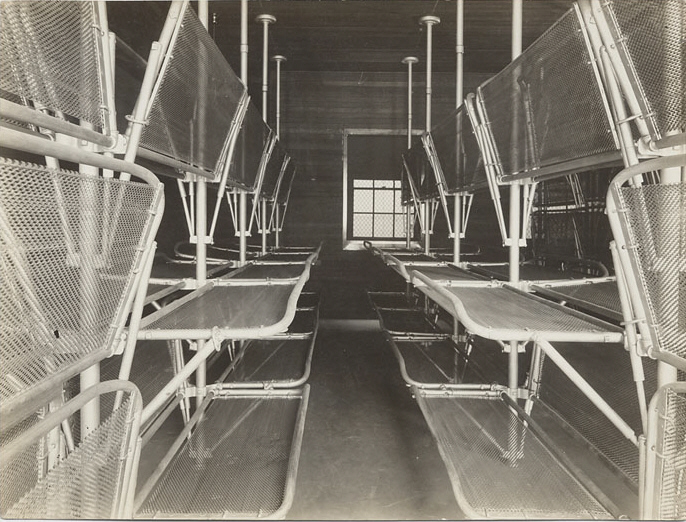
A dormitory at the Angel Island Immigration Station in San Francisco Bay, California, where immigrants coming from China, Japan, Korea, Russia, and South Asia were monitored, interrogated, and detained.

The prohibitions of Chinese and Japanese immigration were consolidated and the exclusion was expanded to Asia as a whole in the Asiatic Barred Zone Act of 1917, which prohibited all immigration from a zone that encompassed parts of the Middle East, Central Asia, South Asia (then-British India), and Southeast Asia. The Immigration Act of 1924 introduced national origin quotas for the entire Eastern Hemisphere, and barred the immigration of "aliens ineligible for citizenship." This introduced a period of near complete exclusion of Asian immigration to the United States. The act also formed the United States Border Patrol to take over duties of the United States Bureau of Immigration (Chinese Division). There were some key exceptions to this broad exclusion: in addition to continuing Filipino immigration due to their status as US nationals until 1934, Asian immigrants continued to immigrate to Hawaii, which was a US territory and therefore not subject to the same immigration laws until it achieved statehood in 1959. Many Chinese had also immigrated to Puerto Rico after 1882, which would become a US territory in 1898 and remains one today.

After exclusion, existing Chinese immigrants were further excluded from agricultural labor by racial hostility, and as jobs in railroad construction declined, they increasingly moved into self-employment as laundry workers, store and restaurant owners, traders, merchants, and wage laborers; and they congregated in Chinatowns established in California and across the country.

Of the various Asian immigrant groups present in the United States after broad exclusion was introduced in 1917 and 1924, the South Asian population had the most severe gender gap. This led to many of the Punjabi Sikhs in California at the time to marry women of Mexican descent, avoiding anti-miscegenation laws and racial prejudice that prevented them from marrying into white communities.

Two important Supreme Court cases in the exclusion era determined the citizenship status of Asian Americans. In 1922, the Court ruled in Takao Ozawa v. United States that ethnic Japanese were not Caucasian, and therefore did not meet the "free white persons" requirement to naturalize according to the Naturalization Act of 1790. A few months later in 1923, the Court ruled in United States v. Bhagat Singh Thind that while Indians were considered Caucasian by contemporary racial anthropology, they were not seen as "white" in the common understanding, and were therefore ineligible for naturalization. Whereas United States vs. Wong Kim Ark had determined that all persons born in the United States, including Asian Americans, were citizens, these cases confirmed that foreign-born Asian immigrants were legally excluded from naturalized citizenship on the basis of race.

During this period, Asian immigrants continued to face racial discrimination. In addition to first-generation immigrants whose permanent ineligibility for citizenship curtailed their civil and political rights, second-generation Asian Americans (who formally had birthright citizenship) continued to face segregation in schools, employment discrimination, and prohibitions on property and business ownership. The most severe discrimination against Asian Americans occurred during the height of the World War II, when 110,000 to 120,000 Japanese Americans (primarily on the West Coast) were incarcerated in internment camps between 1942 and 1946. While roughly a third of those interned were issei (first-generation immigrants) who were ineligible for citizenship, the vast majority were nisei or sansei (second- and third-generation) who were citizens by birth.

=== Phasing out of exclusionary policies (1943–1965) ===
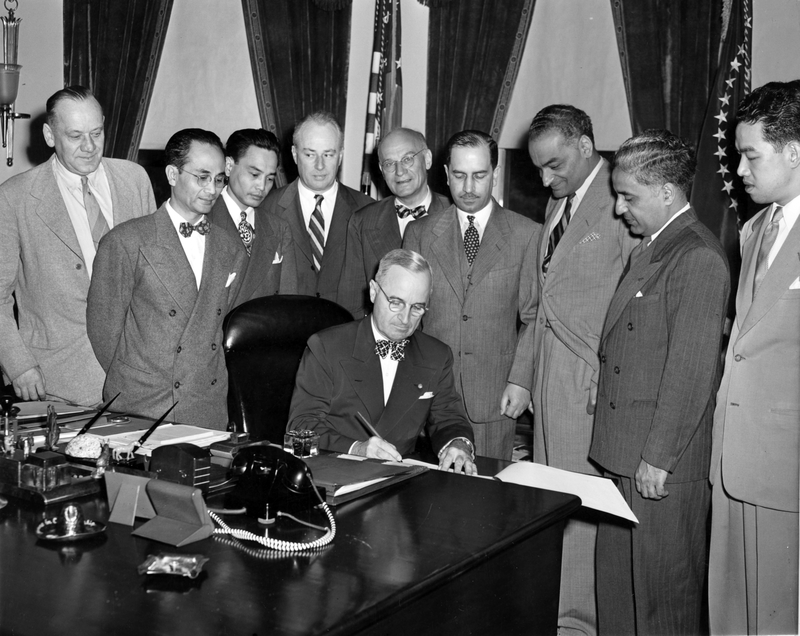
President Harry Truman signs the Luce–Celler Act of 1946, permitting Filipinos and Indians to naturalize and allowing a quota of 100 persons of each to immigrate annually.

After the Second World War, immigration policy in the United States began to undergo significant changes. In 1943, the Chinese Exclusion Repeal Act ended 62 years of Chinese exclusion, providing for a quota of 105 persons to immigrate each year, and permitting the Chinese present in the United States to become naturalized citizens. Despite these provisions, the Act consolidated the prohibition of property or business ownership by Chinese Americans. In 1946, the Luce–Celler Act allowed Filipino and Indian nationals to naturalize and provided for a quota of 100 persons to immigrate from each country. Many Asian Americans (including future congressman Dalip Singh Saund) had been campaigning for such a law for decades. Under the act, upon attaining citizenship, immigrants would be able to own property (a right not afforded to Chinese immigrants in the Chinese Exclusion Repeal Act) and petition for family from their nation of origin.

This wave of reform eventually led to the McCarran–Walter Act of 1952, which repealed the remnants of the "free white persons" restriction of the Naturalization Act of 1790, permitting Asian and other non-white immigrants to become naturalized citizens. However, this Act retained the quota system that effectively banned nearly all immigration from Asia, except for small annual quotas. Its primary exception to the quota system was family reunification provisions for US citizens, which allowed both relatives of longstanding Asian American families and those who had married American soldiers during World War II and the Korean War (also known as "war brides") to immigrate. The McCarran–Walter Act also introduced some labor qualifications for the first time, and allowed the government to bar the entry of or deport immigrants suspected of engaging in "subversive activities", such as membership in a Communist Party.

=== New waves of Asian immigration (1965–present) ===
After the enactment of the 1965 Immigration Act, Asian American demographics changed rapidly. This act replaced exclusionary immigration rules of the 1924 Immigration Act and its predecessors, which effectively excluded "undesirable" immigrants, including most Asians. The 1965 rules set across-the-board immigration quotas for each country.

Senator Hiram Fong (R-HI) answered questions concerning the possible change in our cultural pattern by an influx of Asians:

"Asians represent six-tenths of 1 percent of the population of the United States ... with respect to Japan, we estimate that there will be a total for the first 5 years of some 5,391 ... the people from that part of the world will never reach 1 percent of the population .. .Our cultural pattern will never be changed as far as America is concerned." (U.S. Senate, Subcommittee on Immigration and Naturalization of the Committee on the Judiciary, Washington, D.C., 10 Feb. 1965, pp. 71, 119.) (Note: From 1966 to 1970, 19,399 immigrants came from Japan, more than three times Sen. Fong's estimate. Immigration from Asia as a whole has totaled 5,627,576 from 1966 to 1993. 6.8% of the American population is currently of Asian birth or heritage.)

Immigration of Asian Americans was also affected by U.S. war involvement from the 1940s to the 1970s. In the wake of World War II, immigration preferences favored family reunification. This may have helped attract highly skilled workers to meet American workforce deficiencies. Another instance related to World War II was the Luce–Celler Act of 1946, which helped immigrants from India and the Philippines.

The end of the Korean War and Vietnam War and the "Secret Wars" in Southeast Asia brought a new wave of Asian American immigration, as people from Korea, Vietnam, Laos, and Cambodia arrived. Some of the new immigrants were war brides, who were soon joined by their families. Others, like the Southeast Asians, were either highly skilled and educated, or part of subsequent waves of refugees seeking asylum. Some factors contributing to the growth of sub-groups such as South Asians and mainland Chinese were higher family sizes, higher use of family-reunification visas, and higher numbers of technically skilled workers entering on H-1 and H-1B visas.

Ethnic Chinese immigration to the United States since 1965 has been aided by the fact that the United States maintains separate quotas for mainland China, Taiwan, and Hong Kong. During the late 1960s and early and mid-1970s, Chinese immigration into the United States came almost exclusively from Taiwan creating the Taiwanese American subgroup. A smaller number of immigrants from Hong Kong arrived as college and graduate students. Immigration from mainland China was almost non-existent until 1977, when the PRC removed restrictions on emigration leading to immigration of college students and professionals. These recent groups of Chinese tended to cluster in suburban areas and to avoid urban Chinatowns.

One notable suburban Chinatown was Monterey Park. While it was a predominantly White middle-class community in the 1970s, the demographics quickly changed with the incoming Chinese population. The emergence of Chinese-Americans in Monterey Park could be credited to the efforts of the Chinese realtor Frederic Hsieh. He began investing in abandoned properties in Monterey Park in order to gain the interest of wealthy Chinese in Taiwan. He broadcast his plans back in Taiwan and Hong Kong. He aggressively marketed his project as the new mecca of Chinese Americans: in his own words, "Chinese Beverly Hills". Due to political unrest in Asia, there was a lot of interest in overseas investment for Monterey Park from wealthy Chinese in Taiwan.

The contrasts between Japanese Americans and South Asian Americans are emblematic of the dramatic changes since the immigration reforms. Japanese Americans are among the most widely recognized of Asian American sub-groups during the 20th century. At its peak in 1970, there were nearly 600,000 Japanese Americans, making it the largest sub-group, but historically the greatest period of immigration was generations past. Today, given relatively low rates of births and immigration, Japanese Americans are only the sixth-largest Asian American group. In 2000, there were between 800,000 and 1.2 million Japanese Americans (depending on whether multi-ethnic responses are included). The Japanese Americans have the highest rates of native-born, citizenship, and assimilation into American values and customs.

Before 1990, there were slightly fewer South Asians in the U.S. than Japanese Americans. By 2000, Indian Americans nearly doubled in population to become the third largest group of Asian Americans, with increasing visibility in high-tech communities such as the Silicon Valley and the Seattle area. Indian Americans have some of the highest rates of academic achievement among American ethnic groups. Most immigrants speak English and are highly educated. South Asians are increasingly accepted by most Asian organizations as another significant Asian group. Currently, Chinese, Indians, and Filipinos are the three largest Asian ethnic groups immigrating to the United States. Asians in the U.S. are a highly diverse group that is growing fast. Asian immigrants comprise 6% of the United States population and are estimated to rise to 10% by 2050.

In a 2022-2023 survey of Asian American adults, 28% came to the United States to be with family, 27% came for economic opportunities, 26% came for educational opportunities, and 7% came to escape conflict or persecution in their home country. When looking at the responses of specific Asian ethnicities, the percentages fluctuate depending on the group. For example, 32% of Vietnamese respondents said their reason for coming was conflict or persecution in their home country, compared to 1% of Koreans. This data highlights a variety of reasons for Asian immigration to the U.S. and demonstrates how immigration rates are influenced by both individual situations and the global political climate.

According to the United States Census Bureau, in 2022, the Asian population was the fastest growing racial or ethnic group in the United States. This was largely due to immigration, which accounted for two-thirds of this increase. This statistic shows how immigration continues to play a major role in the growth of the Asian population in the U.S. and reflects broader immigration trends in 21st century U.S. demographics.

== Timeline of key legislation and judicial rulings ==
- 1875 Page Act, the first restrictive immigration law, enabled the prohibition of the entry of forced laborers from Asia and Asian women who would potentially engage in prostitution, who were defined as "undesirable". Enforcement of the law resulted in near-complete exclusion of Chinese women from the United States.
- 1882 Chinese Exclusion Act: Cessation of immigration from China.
- 1898 United States v. Wong Kim Ark: A US-born son of Chinese immigrants was ruled to be a US citizen under the birthright citizenship clause of the 14th Amendment; the Chinese Exclusion Act was held not to apply to someone born in the US.
- 1915 Guinn & Beal v. United States: Ruling found that Filipinos can naturalize.
- 1917 Asiatic Barred Zone Act prohibits immigration to the U.S. from most of the Asian continent, including the region of British India, Southeast Asia, and parts of the Middle East.
- 1922 Takao Ozawa v. United States: Japanese, despite being light-skinned, were deemed non-white as they were not considered Caucasian by contemporary racial science, and were thereby not accorded the rights and privileges of naturalization.
- 1923 United States v. Bhagat Singh Thind: Indians, despite being anthropologically Caucasian, were ruled to be non-white as they were not seen as white in the "common understanding", thus excluding non-U.S. born South Asians from citizenship under the racial prerequisites for naturalization at the time. Indians were further ruled to instead be Asian, thereby subjecting them to pre-existing anti-Asian laws.
- 1924 Immigration Act of 1924 introduces quotas for immigration based on national origin, creating a quota of zero for Asian countries, as well as forming the United States Border Patrol.
- 1935 Nye–Lae Bill grants citizenship to veterans of World War I, including those from "Barred Zones".
- 1943 Chinese Exclusion Repeal Act: Resumption of naturalization rights to Chinese Americans and limited immigration permitted from China.
- 1945 War Brides Act temporarily lifts the ban on Asian immigration for spouses and adopted children of service members.
- 1946 The Alien Fiancées and Fiancés Act allows entrance of foreign-born fiancées of service members to enter as a nonimmigrant temporary visitor visa for three months, and were required to provide proof of valid marriage within that time frame.
- 1946 Luce–Celler Act: Resumption of naturalization rights to Indian Americans and Filipino Americans. Token immigration allowed, quota set at 100 per year from India and 100 per year from the Philippines.
- 1946 Filipino Naturalization Act allows naturalization of Filipino Americans, and grants citizenship to those who arrived prior to March 1943.
- 1952 Walter–McCarran Act nullifies all federal anti-Asian exclusion laws; allowed for naturalization of all Asians. Immigration quotas still remain in place.
- 1965 Immigration and Nationality Act of 1965 eliminates racial/nationality-based discrimination in immigration quotas.
- 1989 American Homecoming Act: Allowed Amerasian children from Vietnam to immigrate to the United States.

== See also ==
- History of immigration to the United States
- Immigration history and patterns of Asian ethnic groups in the United States
  - Bangladeshi Americans
  - Burmese Americans
  - Cambodian Americans
  - Chinese Americans
  - Filipino American immigration history
  - Hmong Americans
  - Indian American immigration history
  - Japanese American immigration history
  - Karen Americans
  - Korean Americans
  - Pakistani Americans
  - Vietnamese Americans
- United States Immigration Station, Angel Island
