= Alien Fiancées and Fiancés Act of 1946 =

1946 US law

The Alien Fiancées and Fiancés Act of 1946 (Pub. L. 79-471; 60 stat. 339, enacted June 29, 1946), also known as G.I. Fiancée Act, was an extension of the War Brides Act that eliminated barriers for Filipino and Indian war brides. The barriers for Korean and Japanese war brides were removed by a 1947 amendment.

According to Aaron D. Horton, nearly 45,000 foreign-born women entered the United States under the act. Fiancés who did not marry after arriving in the United States were subject to deportation. Furthermore, most women who immigrated were of European descent. But many Asian women, especially large numbers of Chinese, Japanese, and Filipino women, also entered the United States under the act, who previously were unable to immigrate due to strict quotas on Asian immigration.

Under the act, women who entered the United States and married within three months of entering received permanent immigrant status. According to Emily Alward, admission of Asian women into the United States ultimately made the Immigration and Nationality Act of 1965 possible.

The act was scheduled to expire on July 1, 1947, but was extended to December 31, 1948, the same expiry date as the War Brides Act.

== See also ==
- War Brides Act
- Immigration and Nationality Act of 1965
