= War Brides Act =

1945 law in the United States

- Long title: An Act to expedite the admission to the United States of alien spouses and alien minor children of citizen members of the United States armed forces.
- Enacted by: the 79th United States Congress

Citations
- Public law: Pub. L. 79-271
- Statutes at Large: 59 Stat. 659

Legislative history
- Introduced in the House as H.R. 4857 by Samuel Dickstein on December 3, 1945; Signed into law by President Harry S. Truman on December 28, 1945

The War Brides Act (59 Stat. 659, Act of Dec. 28, 1945) was enacted on December 28, 1945, to allow alien spouses, natural children and adopted children of members of the United States Armed Forces, "if admissible", to enter the US as non-quota immigrants after World War II. More than 100,000 entered the United States under this Act and its extensions and amendments until it expired in December 1948. The War Brides Act was a part of new approach to immigration law that focused on family reunification over racial exclusion. There were still racial limits that existed particularly against Asian populations, and Chinese spouses were the only Asian nationality that qualified to be brought to the United States under the act. The act was well supported and easily passed because family members of servicemen were the recipients, but concerns over marital fraud caused some tension.

== Content ==
The 1945 Act only exempted spouses and dependents of military personnel from the quotas established by the Immigration Act of 1924 and the mental and health standards otherwise in force. The quotas in the Immigration Act of 1924, at first, reduced the percentage admitted from 3 to 2, with the base population being the number of immigrants of each nationality present in the United States in 1890. This changed in 1927 with the introduction of the National Origins test, which capped the total number of annual admissions at 150,000, and with the 1920 population as the base, it assigned quotas on the basis of "national origins". The Immigration Act of 1924 excluded immigrants from the New World and their descendants; descendants of "American aborigines"; descendants of "slave immigrants"; and Asians or their descendants through the calculation of national origins. The 1882 Chinese Exclusion Act was repealed in 1943 by the Chinese Exclusion Repeal Act, and this allowed Chinese spouses of US armed service members to immigrate to the United States under the War Brides Act. Chinese spouses were the only Asian spouses that were allowed to be admitted by the War Brides Act. The Alien Fiancées and Fiancés Act of 1946 (60 stat. 339, Act of June 29, 1946) extended the privileges to Filipino and Asian Indian fiancées and fiancés of war veterans. In 1950, Congress voted to bring back the War Brides Act and this return expanded the privilege of immigration on a non-quota basis to Korean and Japanese spouses.

Servicemen and their demands to bring their wives home forced Congress to resolve a tension in American immigration law and policy, between family unification and racial exclusion. The federal courts and US immigration service had demonstrated a history of facilitating family unification, but it was not widely available to all racial groups, specifically Asians. The Immigration Act of 1924 included the National Origins Act which possessed a system of Asian exclusion and these policies carried over into the passage of the War Brides Act. With the inclusion of Chinese and later other Asians, the War Brides Act demonstrated that lawmakers could reform immigration law around the issue of family reunification by shifting the focus from race to family and deserving military personnel. On the other hand, those that advocated for immigration restriction supported family reunification because it could be used to uphold national origins and maintain racial segregation.

Congress amended the War Brides Act in July 1947 in order to address explicit racial discrimination. The amendment allowed Asian spouses, but not children, of active and honorably discharged members of the armed forces eligible for non-quota immigration. The main issue with this amendment is that it only allowed a spouse to be admitted if they were married before thirty days after the enactment of the act. Service members and veterans would only have a thirty-day window to receive permission to marry and arrange a wedding. This made the likelihood of arranging a marriage overseas low, but this was changed in August 1950 when Congress allowed all spouses and minor children of service members eligible to immigrate under a non-quota basis as long as the marriage occurred before March 19, 1952.

The United States Supreme Court, in Lutwak v. United States (1953), considered the case of the fraudulent use of the War Brides Act, upholding convictions of parties to a conspiracy to arrange for the immigration of three Polish refugees. It was claimed that the marriages celebrated in France were never consummated and that the married never lived together.

== Background ==
In response to World War II and the large number of servicemen that had wives and families abroad, the War Brides Act was passed in December 1945. The act was meant to facilitate the immigration of women and children from Europe for five years after World War II. The War Brides Act was passed for three main reasons: recognition of men's rights to have their wives and children with them, reward for military service and the principle of family unification. It was a widely held belief that servicemen who served their country selflessly and were viewed as heroes should be able to bring their wives and families home to the United States with them.

Many Congress members also believed that the proposed War Brides legislation would not change immigration practices much. The only Asian spouses that could be brought were of Chinese descent and there were a small number of American citizens of Chinese descent. This also meant that there was an even smaller number of servicemen of Chinese descent, and they would most likely be the ones to bring Chinese brides back to the United States. Lawmakers shared this point of view that American servicemen bringing Chinese wives would be Chinese as well and they did not want to encourage racial mixing by the passage of the War Brides Act and any of its amendments. Later war brides of Japanese, Korean, Vietnamese, or Filipino descent came to represent the war bride in a different way because later war brides were mostly in interracial marriages, while Chinese war brides were mostly in intraracial marriages.

== Marital fraud concerns ==
The War Brides Act brought about increased concern over marital fraud. Some of this came from nativists because of the increase of immigrants, and some from other people. Marriage to a soldier was no guarantee of admission into the United States and the women who entered as war brides remained under scrutiny of their marriage legitimacy. The concerns of fraud came from wives who would migrate under this act and then not live with their husbands or obtain a divorce. In order to prove that they were married, women had to provide proof of their marriage or engagement to a US serviceman; a war bride's status was dependent on that of her husband and if her husband was found not to be a soldier or not to have been honorably discharged, she was inadmissible as well.

== See also ==
- Nationality Act of 1940
- Immigration and Nationality Act of 1965
- History of Asian American immigration
- History of laws concerning immigration and naturalization in the United States
- List of United States Immigration Acts
- National Origins Formula
- Alien Fiancées and Fiancés Act of 1946
- I Was a Male War Bride (1949 film)
