= Canadian Wives' Bureau =

Canadian Wives' Bureau was set up in 1944 by the Department of National Defence (Canada). A joint effort between Canadian immigration officials, the military, and the Canadian Red Cross, it arranged ship and train travel for war brides and dependants to their Canadian husbands.

== History ==
The Maple Leaf Club founded in September 1941 was the earliest known club where British wives of Canadians could go to learn about what to expect in their soon-to-be home. It was followed in 1943 by the Princess Alice Clubs. The Immigration Branch of the Department of Mines and Resources arranged dependants' travel until August 1944.

== Beginnings ==
The Canadian Wives' Bureau was created to address the need for a consolidated service for war brides and dependants travelling to Canada. Alongside overseeing the transportation of women and children to Canada, it also supported local war brides associations in England and Scotland between 1944 and 1947.

The Department of National Defence (Canada) set up the Bureau's office on the third floor of Galeries Lafayette on Regent Street in London.

== Responsibilities ==
The Canadian Wives' Bureau was established as a directorate of the Adjutant-General's Branch of the Canadian military. They were responsible for arranging dependants' travel to Canada, caring for them en route, and providing information to available services.

War brides' club creation was encouraged by the Canadian Wives' Bureau across the United Kingdom. By November 1945, there were thirty-two brides' clubs in England and Scotland. They held social gatherings and talks to discuss Canadian society.

By early 1947, the number of war brides and dependants declined greatly. As a result, the responsibilities were reassigned to the Immigration Branch of the Department of Mines and Resource on February 2, 1947.
