= Anna Chang =

Chinese–American musical comedian

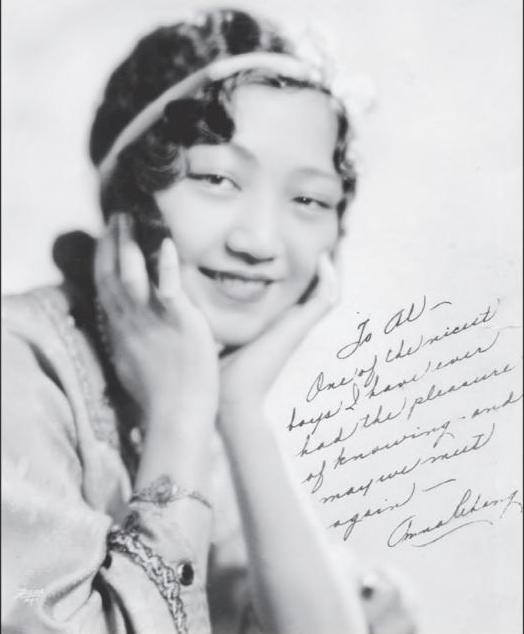
- Born: August 21, 1910; San Francisco
- Occupation: Actor, singer

Anna Chang (born August 21, 1910) was an American musical comedian, vaudevillian, and Jazz Age singer. A rare Chinese–American performer in early Hollywood, she appeared in two short films and a feature-length movie.

Anna Chang was born on August 21, 1910 in San Francisco, California. She began performing at the age of six and regularly appeared as a musical performer in California and elsewhere in the US. She also appeared in the revue Hula Blues.

She appeared in the Paramount short film Two Little Chinese Maids (1929) alongside the Japanese-American actress Hatsu Kuma, performing the song "East is West." She was the star of Singapore Sue (1932), a short film featuring her as a waitress who rejects a lecherous white sailor, where she sung "How Can A Girl Say No?." The sailor was played by Cary Grant in his film debut, whose first line was "Oh, boy, what a great day to have good eyesight!". The sailor would proposition Sue with clumsy and racist come-ons like "You and me, we chop suey through the park?" Grant would later request the film be removed from his tribute reel at the 42nd Academy Awards. She also appeared in The Hatchet Man (1932) starring Edward G. Robinson. Robinson and most of the white cast appeared in yellowface, but Chang and a few other Asian actors appeared in small roles. Robinson referred to the film in his memoirs as "horrible."

== Filmography ==
- Two Little Chinese Maids (Paramount, 1929)
- Singapore Sue (Paramount, 1932)
- The Hatchet Man (First National-Vitaphone, 1932)

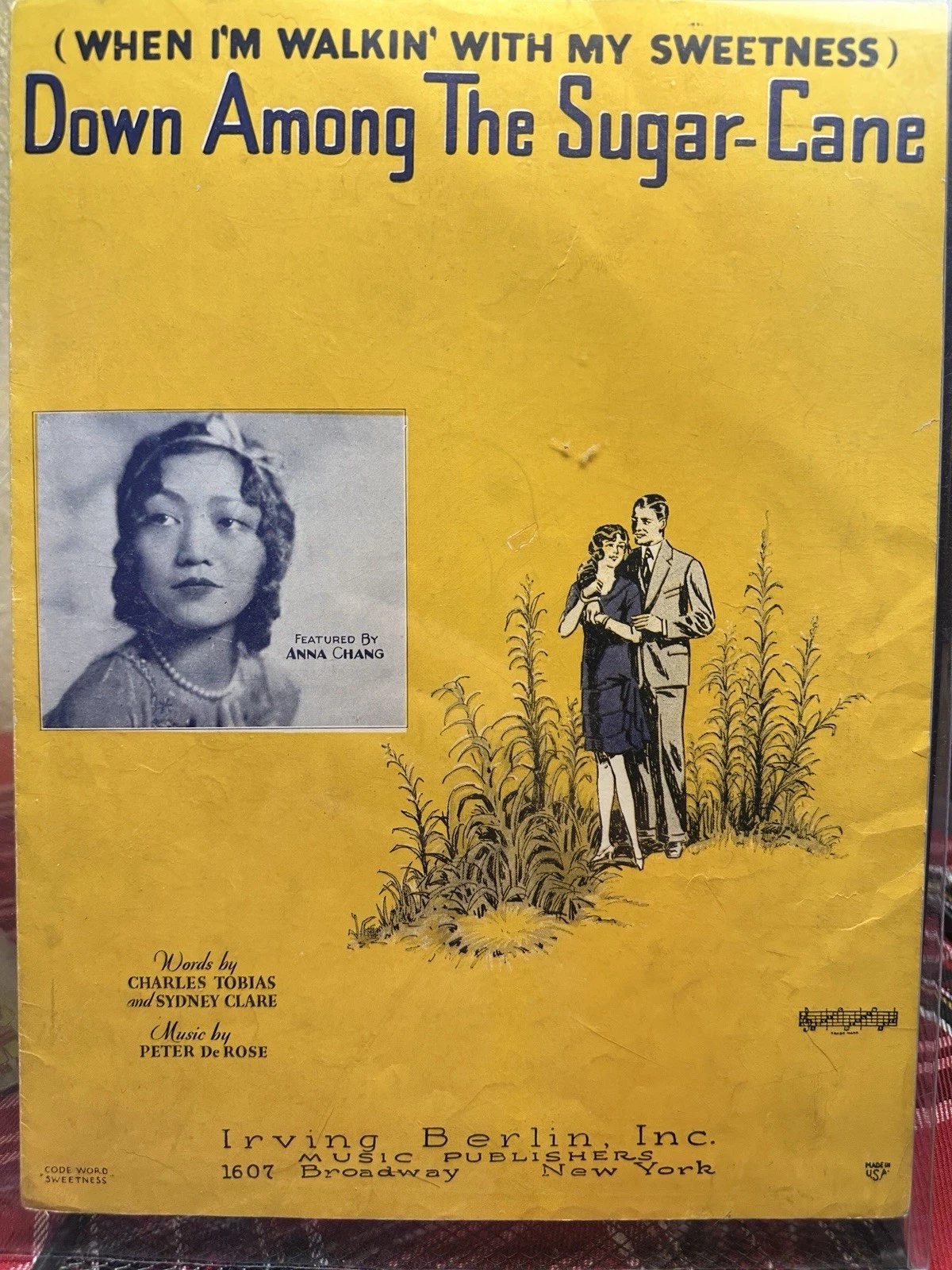
Sheet Music Cover, 1928
