= I Was a Male War Bride =

1949 film by Howard Hawks

- Theatrical poster
- Directed by: Howard Hawks
- Screenplay by: Charles Lederer; Leonard Spigelgass; Hagar Wilde
- Based on: "Male War Bride Trial to Army"; Baltimore Sun 1947 by Henri Rochard
- Produced by: Sol C. Siegel
- Starring: Cary Grant; Ann Sheridan; Marion Marshall
- Cinematography: Osmond Borradaile; Norbert Brodine
- Edited by: James B. Clark
- Music by: Cyril J. Mockridge
- Distributed by: 20th Century Fox
- Release date: August 26, 1949
- Running time: 105 minutes
- Language: English
- Box office: $4.1 million (US/ Canada rentals)

I Was a Male War Bride is a 1949 screwball comedy film directed by Howard Hawks and starring Cary Grant and Ann Sheridan.

The film was based on "Male War Bride Trial to Army", a biography of Henri Rochard (pen name of Roger Charlier), a Belgian who married an American nurse.

The film is about French Army officer Henri Rochard (Grant) who must pass as a war bride in order to go back to the United States with Women's Army Corps officer Catherine Gates (Sheridan).

== Plot ==
In Heidelberg in post–World War II Allied-occupied Germany, French Army Captain Henri Rochard is given the task of recruiting a highly skilled lens maker named Schindler. He is assigned American Lieutenant Catherine Gates as his driver, much to their mutual discomfort (arising from several prior clashes). The only available transportation is a motorcycle which, due to Army regulations, only Catherine is allowed to drive; Henri has to ride in the sidecar. After several mishaps, the constantly quarreling couple arrive at their destination, Bad Nauheim.

At the hotel, bothered by back pain, Catherine warily accepts Henri's offer of a back rub. When she falls asleep, he tries to leave her room, but the exterior door handle falls off, trapping him inside. He spends an uncomfortable night in a chair. In the morning, she refuses to believe his story. Unknown to him, the innkeeper's wife has replaced the exterior knob, so when he tells Catherine to see for herself how the door will not open, it does. Eventually, the innkeeper's wife comes to the room, forcing Henri to hide on the ledge outside the window. The innkeeper's wife explains everything to Catherine, but not before Henri falls off the ledge.

Later, Henri goes undercover to search for Schindler, now working in the black market. He refuses to let Catherine help him and tells her that if she sees him to pretend she does not know him. The black market is raided by the authorities, and he is rounded up with everyone else. When he asks her to vouch for his identity, she obeys his earlier order not to reveal that she knows him. While he is in jail, she finds Schindler, who is happy to leave Germany and ply his trade in France. Later, she apologizes to a furious Henri, and by the time they return to Heidelberg, they have fallen in love.

Red tape requires Henri and Catherine to be married first in a civil ceremony before they can each have their own choices for the ceremony: an Army chaplain (Catherine) and a French church (Henri). Before they can consummate their marriage in a Paris hotel, Catherine is ordered to report immediately to headquarters in the morning, as her unit is about to be shipped back to the United States. They subsequently learn that the only way Henri can get a visa is under the War Brides Act as the spouse of an American soldier. After many misunderstandings, caused by the unusual nature of his situation, he is given permission to accompany her, but circumstances and Army regulations conspire to keep them from spending the night together. The navy and army have him registered as Mrs. Henri Richard.

When they try to board the transport ship, Navy sailors do not accept that Henri is a war "bride". Catherine persuades him to dress as a female Army nurse to get aboard. The deception works, but once underway, their ruse is discovered and he is arrested. Catherine goes to the ship's captain who understands the legalities of their situation, and they finally have some privacy — in the ship's brig.

== Cast ==
- Cary Grant as Capt. Henri Rochard
- Ann Sheridan as Lt. Catherine Gates
- Marion Marshall as Lt. Kitty Lawrence
- Randy Stuart as Lt. Eloise Billings (Mae)
- William Neff as Capt. Jack Rumsey
- Eugene Gericke as Tony Jowitt
- Ruben Wendorf as Innkeeper's Assistant
- Lester Sharpe as Waiter
- John Whitney as Trumble
- Kenneth Tobey as Seaman
- Robert Stevenson as Lieutenant
- Alfred Linder as Bartender
- David McMahon as Chaplain
- Joe Haworth as Shore Patrol
- Gil Herman as Naval Officer
- Lily Kann as Innkeeper's Wife
- Harry Lauter as Lieutenant
- Alex Gerry as Waiter
- André Charlot as French Minister
- Russ Conway as Cmdr. Willis
- Mike Mahoney as Sailor
- William McLean as Expectant GI
- Paul Hardtmuth as Burgermeister
- Barbara Perry as Tall WAC
- William Pullen as Sergeant
- Otto Reichow as German Policeman (uncredited)
- Bill Self as Sergeant with War Bride (uncredited)
- John Serret as French Notary
- Martin Miller as Schindler
- William Murphy as Sergeant
- William Yetter Jr. as German Policeman
- John Zilly as Shore Patrol
- Kay Young as Maj. Prendergast
- Eleanor Audley as Assignment Officer (uncredited)
- Robert Nichols as Sergeant (uncredited film debut)

== Production ==
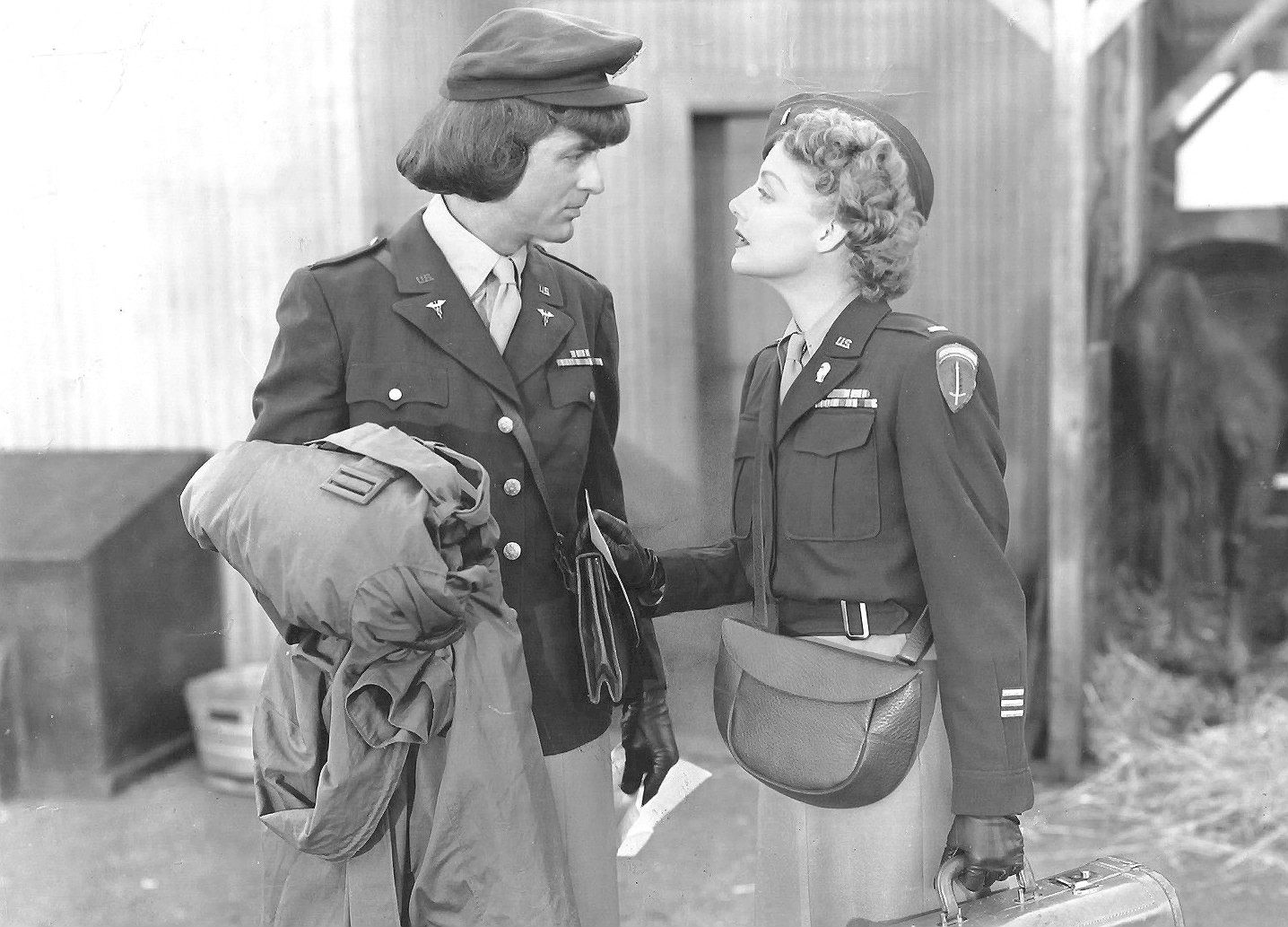
Cary Grant as a cross-dressing Capt. Henri Rochard, and Ann Sheridan as Lt. Catherine Gates.

Filming began on September 28, 1948, and lasted more than eight months due to a variety of illnesses contracted by cast members and crew. Sheridan contracted pleurisy that developed into pneumonia, suspending shooting for two weeks. Hawks broke out in unexplained hives all over his body. Grant came down with hepatitis complicated by jaundice, and production was shut down for three months, until Grant recovered and regained around 30 pounds. When screenwriter Charles Lederer was ill, his friend Orson Welles wrote part of a short chase scene as a favor to him. The delay in production pushed the budget over $2 million.

Filming took place primarily in Heidelberg, Germany, London at Shepperton Studios, and Los Angeles at the 20th Century Fox studios. King Donovan, Charles B. Fitzsimons, Robert Stevenson, and Otto Waldis all shot scenes for this film, but all of them were ultimately deleted.

== Reception ==
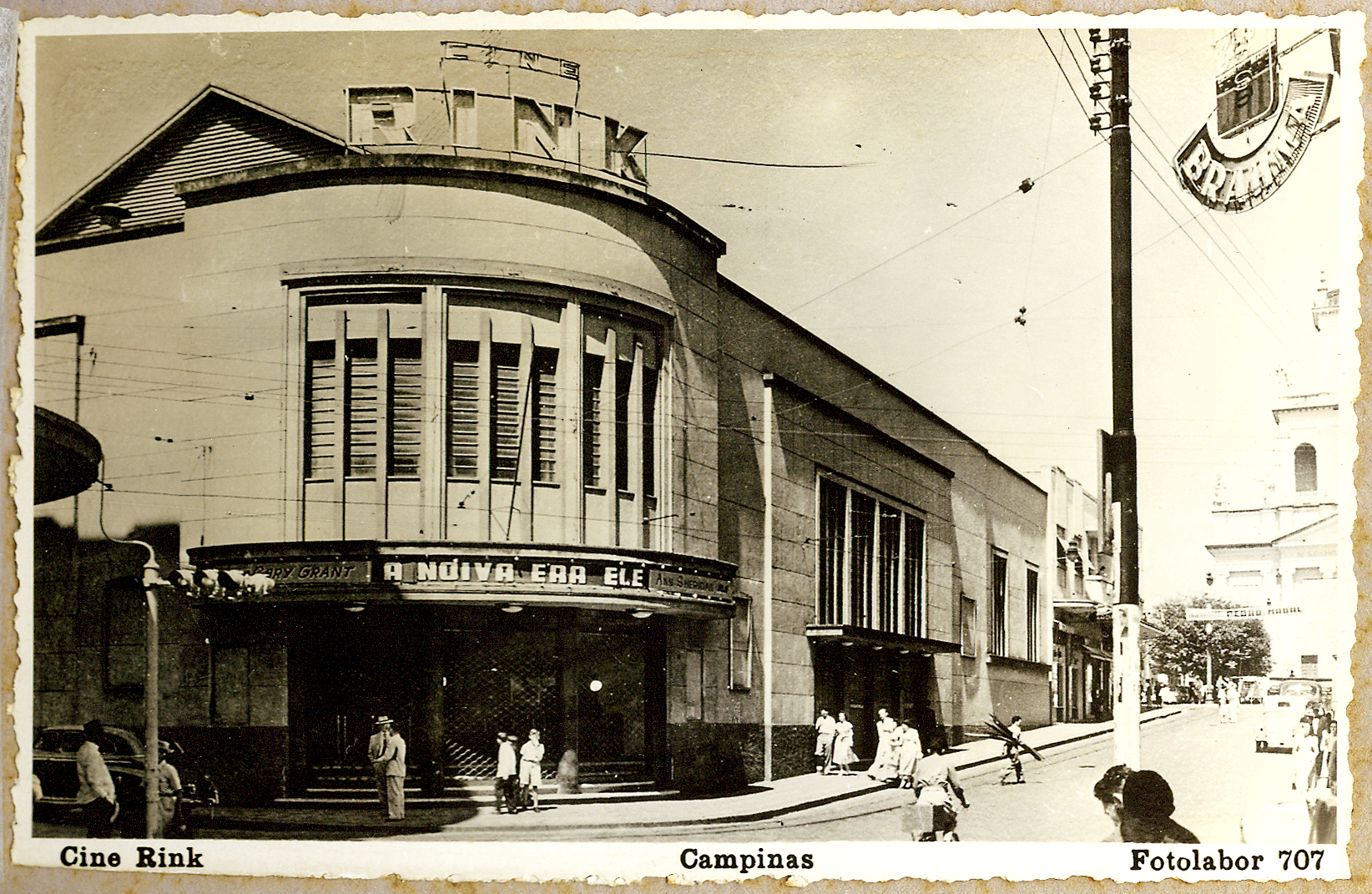
In Brazil, the movie was released as A Noiva era Ele

The film played Grauman's Chinese Theatre for two weeks starting August 19, 1949. Its New York premiere was on August 26, 1949, at the Roxy Theatre. The opening was originally scheduled for Radio City Music Hall, but filming delays placed the opening in conflict with the Music Hall's schedule.

Bosley Crowther of The New York Times wrote a generally positive review, finding that a "tediously long time" was spent setting up the plot but that the film's best scenes were "convulsingly zany stuff". Variety was also mostly positive, calling the film "a smash combo of saucy humor and slapstick", though it thought that the story had "trouble finding a point at which to end." Harrison's Reports called it "An hilariously funny sophisticated comedy ... The direction is bright and snappy, and both Grant and Sheridan do very good work, romping through the farcical situations in a highly amusing way." Richard L. Coe of The Washington Post wrote that there were "a good many laughs" in the film, though he found too many of the comedic situations to consist of "the obvious worked to death". Philip Hamburger of The New Yorker was negative, writing, "One cannot blame Miss Sheridan for the accumulated inanities to which she is subjected (the antics in this film are too childish to bear enumeration), but she does as little with them as humanly possible."

The film holds a score of 79% on review aggregation website Rotten Tomatoes based on 11 out of 14 surveyed critics giving it a positive review.

The film grossed over $4.5 million, making it 20th's biggest earner of 1949. It was also Howard Hawks' 3rd highest grosser to that time, behind only Sergeant York (1941) and Red River (1948).
