= Chinese Exclusion Repeal Act =

U.S. federal law that repealed the Chinese Exclusion Act

- Long title: An Act to repeal the Chinese Exclusion Acts, to establish quotas, and for other purposes.
- Acronyms (colloquial): CERA
- Nicknames: Magnuson Act
- Enacted by: the 78th United States Congress
- Effective: December 17, 1943

Citations
- Public law: Pub. L. 78–199
- Statutes at Large: 57 Stat. 600

Codification
- Acts repealed: Chinese Exclusion Act
- Titles amended: 8 U.S.C.: Aliens and Nationality
- U.S.C. sections amended: 8 U.S.C. ch. 7 §§ 262-297 & 299

Legislative history
- Introduced in the House as H.R. 3070 by Warren Magnuson (D–WA) on October 7, 1943; Committee consideration by House Immigration and Naturalization, Senate Immigration and Naturalization; Passed the House on October 21, 1943 (Passed); Passed the Senate on November 26, 1943 (Passed); Signed into law by President Franklin D. Roosevelt on December 17, 1943

The Chinese Exclusion Repeal Act of 1943, or Magnuson Act of 1943, was an immigration law proposed by US Representative (later Senator) Warren Magnuson of Washington and signed into law on December 17, 1943, in the United States. It allowed Chinese immigration for the first time since the Chinese Exclusion Act of 1882, and permitted some Chinese immigrants already residing in the country to become naturalized citizens. However, in many states, Chinese Americans (mostly immigrants but sometimes US citizens) were denied property-ownership rights either by law or de facto until the Chinese Exclusion Repeal Act itself was fully repealed in 1965.

This act is the first legislation since 1870 which relaxed racial and national immigration barriers in the United States and started the way to the completely non-racial immigration legislation and policy of the late 1960s.

The Chinese Exclusion Repeal Act was passed on December 17, 1943, two years after the Republic of China became an official allied nation of the United States in World War II. Although considered a positive development by many, it was still restrictive, limiting Chinese immigrants to an annual quota of 105 new entry visas. The quota was determined according to the National Origins Formula prescribed by the Immigration Act of 1924, which set immigration quotas on countries subject to the law as a fraction of 150,000 in proportion to the number of inhabitants of that nationality residing in the United States as of the 1920 census, which for China was determined to be 0.07%, or 105 per annum. Chinese immigration later increased with the passage of the Hart-Celler Act, which abolished the National Origins Formula.

== See also ==
- Asian immigration to the United States
- Chinese Exclusion Act
- Geary Act
- Page Act
- Scott Act
