= Singapore Sue =

1932 film

- Directed by: Casey Robinson
- Written by: Casey Robinson
- Starring: Anna Chang; Joe Wong; Cary Grant
- Distributed by: Paramount Pictures
- Release date: June 10, 1932
- Running time: 10 minutes
- Country: United States
- Language: English

Singapore Sue is a 1932 musical comedy short written and directed by Casey Robinson. It was one of Cary Grant's first film roles. After working in the theater, while in New York, a West Coast scout discovered him in a Broadway play called "The Last Flight" and offered him a small role, as a young soldier, in Singapore Sue, he was hired on May 8, 1931, for six days and paid $150 for his work.

== Plot ==
The story is about four sailors and one of them enjoys himself at the bar.

== Cast ==
- Anna Chang as Singapore Sue
- Joe Wong as Gigolo and Singer
- Cary Grant as First Sailor (uncredited)
- Pickard's Chinese Syncopators

== Production ==
The film was shot at Kaufman Astoria Studios.

== Soundtrack ==
How Can a Girl Say No?
Sung by Anna Chang
Open Up Those Eyes
Music by Johnny Green
Lyrics by Edward Heyman
Sung by Joe Wong and Pickard's Chinese Syncopaters
