= Roger Charlier =

Belgian oceanographer

- Born: 10 November 1921; Antwerp, Belgium
- Died: 16 September 2018 (aged 96); Etterbeek, Belgium
- Education: University of Erlangen–Nuremberg (PhD); University of Paris (LitD and ScD)
- Known for: Being the subject of the movie I Was a Male War Bride.
- Awards: Several war medals, including Volunteer's Medal 1940–1945 and Political Prisoner's Cross 1940–1945; several civil distinctions, including Ordre des Palmes académiques and Knight of the Order of Leopold
- Scientific career
- Fields: Oceanography, Earth Sciences
- Workplaces: Finch College; Polycultural University; Hofstra University; Parsons College; Northeastern Illinois University; University of Bordeaux

Roger Henri Louise Lievin Constance Charlier (10 November 1921 – 16 September 2018) was a Belgian resistance fighter, member of the prosecuting team at the Nuremberg trials, and oceanographer. His marriage to American Captain Marie Helen Glennon and administrative difficulties regarding his residency in the US was dramatised in the film I Was a Male War Bride, with Cary Grant as Charlier.

== Early life and Second World War ==
Charlier's paternal grandparents were from Wallonia and his maternal grandparents were from Flanders. He started out as a teacher at a secondary school in the early 1940s. During the Second World War, he was commissioned on 15 February 1945 and demobilised on 31 October 1945. He was briefly imprisoned by the Germans. After his release, he commanded a unit in Limburg. Working for the Belgian Ministry of Justice, he became a member of the prosecuting team for the Belgian and Luxembourg delegation to the Nuremberg trials, interrogating, among others, Eggert Reeder and Alexander von Falkenhausen. Furthermore, he was a newspaper correspondent, including an editor at De Volksgazet (1949).

== Career ==
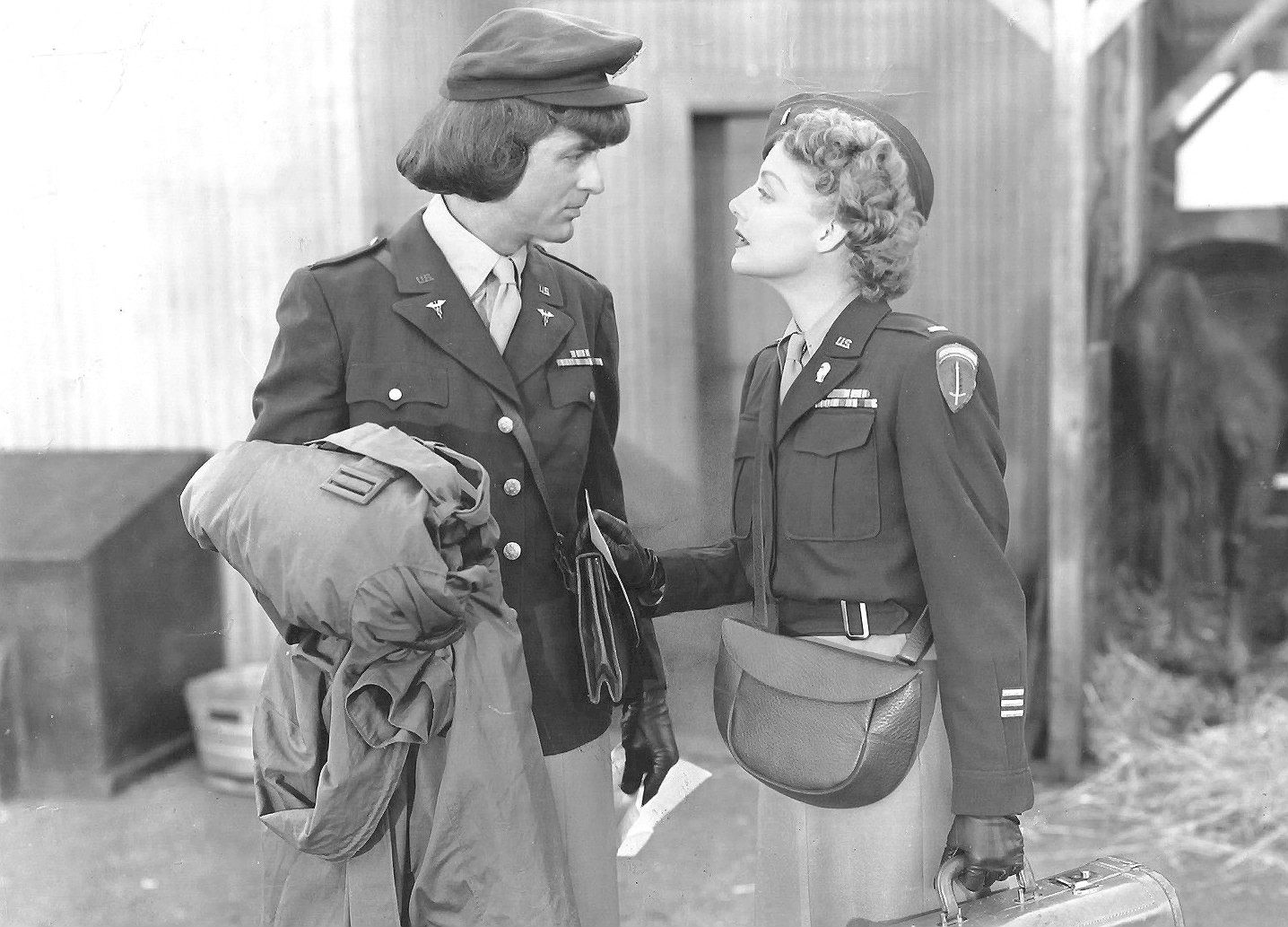
Cary Grant as a cross-dressing Capt. Henri Rochard, and Ann Sheridan as Lt. Catherine Gates, in I Was a Male War Bride (1949)

He became deputy-director to the United Nations Relief and Rehabilitation Administration (UNRRA), managing a refugee camp in Ansbach, near Nuremberg. Around this time, he met and married American army nurse Captain Marie Helen Glennon. This marriage was highly uncommon, since more American male soldiers married European women. The American consul in Frankfurt advised Charlier that "spouse" could mean groom as well as bride, which helped to regularise his situation. Charlier wrote a book about this episode of his life under the pen name Henri Rochard. The Hollywood film I Was a Male War Bride was based on this autobiography. However, the famous scene where Charlier, played by Cary Grant, impersonates a female army nurse, was not historically correct. Glennon died after ten years of the marriage. The couple had no children. Later, Charlier married Patricia Mary Simonet, with whom he had two children.

The largest part of his almost eight-decade–long career was marked by teaching and research activities in oceanography and earth sciences. In 1958, he was doing research in energy of the oceans (waves, tides, salt concentrations) on the ship of Jacques-Yves Cousteau, the RV Calypso, under the lead of Jacques Bourcart. Charlier was early in drawing attention to global warming, promoting sustainable energy production and equitable use of marine resources. Charlier has taught as a professor, visiting professor, and research scholar at many universities in the US, France, and Belgium, including at Finch College (1958–1983), Northeastern Illinois University (1961–1986), and the University of Bordeaux (1972–1975). He retired in 1989, but wrote several publications during his retirement. He died on 16 September 2018 in Etterbeek, Belgium.

== Publications ==
=== Books ===
- Roger H. Charlier (1958). Antwerpen: die Bedeutung der belgischen Handelsmetropole im westeuropaeischen Raum. Ein Beitrage sur [sic] historischen und wirtschaftlichen Stadtgeographie. Maplegrove Press.
- Roger H. Charlier; Christian P. De Meyer (10 April 2006). Coastal Erosion: Response and Management. Springer. ISBN 978-3-540-49405-8.
- R.H. Charlier; J.R. Justus (17 September 1993). Ocean Energies: Environmental, Economic and Technological Aspects of Alternative Power Sources. Elsevier. pp. 1–. ISBN 978-0-08-087094-6.
- R. H. Charlier; Charles W. Finkl (8 February 2009). Ocean Energy: Tide and Tidal Power. Springer Science & Business Media. pp. 9–. ISBN 978-3-540-77932-2.
- Roger H. Charlier (1955). Overzicht van de geografie der Floridaanse heide. Oudheidkundige Kring.
- Roger Henri Charlier (1960). The Gifted, a National Resource; with an Annotated Bibliography. Bureau of Educational Research, College of Education, University of Minnesota.

=== Journal articles ===
- Charlier, Roger H. (2003). "A "sleeper" awakes: tidal current power". Renewable and Sustainable Energy Reviews. 7 (6): 515–529. Bibcode:2003RSERv...7..515C. doi:10.1016/S1364-0321(03)00079-0. ISSN 1364-0321.
- Charlier, R. H.; Morand, P.; Finkl, C. W.; Thys, A. (2006). "Green tides on the Brittany coasts". 2006 IEEE US/EU Baltic International Symposium. pp. 1–13. doi:10.1109/BALTIC.2006.7266128. ISBN 978-1-5090-0212-2. S2CID 33557719.
- Charlier, Roger H.; Chaineux, Marie Claire P.; Morcos, Selim (2005). "Panorama of the History of Coastal Protection" (PDF). Journal of Coastal Research. 211: 79–111. doi:10.2112/03561.1. ISSN 0749-0208. S2CID 129044569.
- Charlier, Roger H.; Chaineux, Marie-Claire P. (2009). "The Healing Sea: A Sustainable Coastal Ocean Resource: Thalassotherapy". Journal of Coastal Research. 254: 838–856. doi:10.2112/08A-0008.1. ISSN 0749-0208. S2CID 40215043.
