= A Dictionary of Similes =

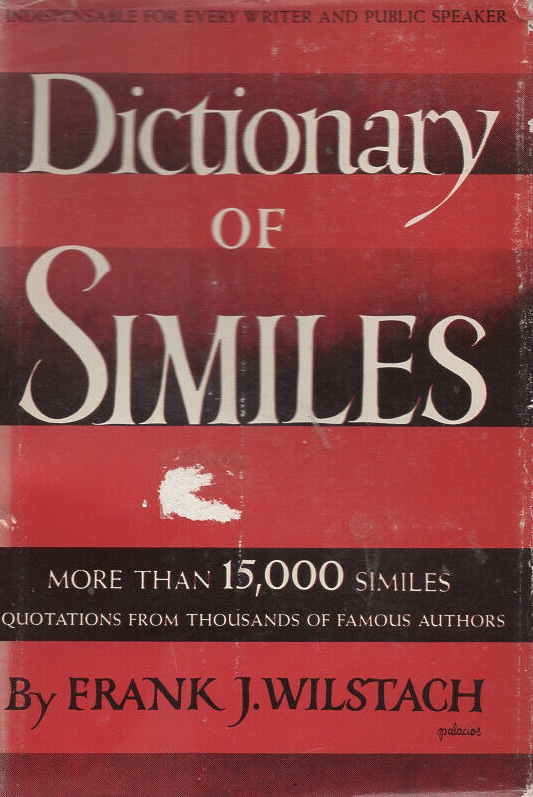
- Cover of the 1924 edition
- Author: Frank J. Wilstach
- Language: English
- Genre: Dictionary
- Publisher: Little, Brown and Company
- Publication date: 1916
- Publication place: United States

A Dictionary of Similes is a dictionary of similes written by the American writer and newspaperman Frank J. Wilstach. In 1916, Little, Brown and Company in Boston published Wilstach's A Dictionary of Similes, a compilation he had been working on for more than 20 years. It included more than 15,000 examples from more than 800 authors, indexing them under more than 3,000 topics and, where possible, identifying their first use.

== Writing ==
In the preface (and in interviews about the book) Wilstach told how he started working on the compilation in 1894:

One day in the spring of that year, when in Boston, I was looking over the morning papers and, being interested in some incident at the State House, read that "the news spread like wildfire." Having noted the coincidence of all the newspapers using this simile, and having observed its frequent use in the press, I asked a journalistic acquaintance if there was no substitute for "spread like wildfire." He replied that he had never heard of news spreading in any other way. My curiosity aroused, I stepped into the bookstore of Little, Brown & Company, then located in Washington Street, near the Globe newspaper office, and asked for a "Dictionary of Similes." The clerk looked in vain over the shelves; then, having fumbled through the leaves of a huge volume, returned with the information that such a book had never been published. As I was actively engaged at the time, I had then no intention of supplying the apparent omission. But from that day I began to copy into a large blank book the similes in every book I read.

He described how, while traveling across the country in his role as a theatrical agent, he would visit libraries in many cities, pulling quotations from books in the libraries and in his own extensive collection of books. (There are at least three books from his own collection that have been digitized as part of the Google Books project, complete with his underlining and annotation of terms.)

== Reviews ==
The book was widely reviewed and widely praised. Reviewers said it deserved a place on the shelves of teachers, writers, speakers, and students alongside Roget's Thesaurus and Bartlett's Familiar Quotations. The New York Times Review of Books said it "will be found indispensable for every library, public or private." Life magazine used its own similes to describe Wilstach:

Mr. Wilstach has been as industrious as a pack-rat, as keen eyed as a clipping bureau and as persistent as a cough in church. His work is as monumental as a mausoleum, and should prove as handy as an orphan asylum.

In the most extensive review of A Dictionary of Similes, Lawrence Gilman of the North American Review called the book "unprecedented and delightful" and "a gigantic and staggering undertaking." "[W]e can think of no one," wrote Gilman, "who might have accomplished this gargantuan adventure more satisfactorily than Mr. Wilstach: for he has shown liberality, fine taste, and an admirable susceptibility to contemporary excellence.” Gilman, however, questioned how valuable the book would be to good writers:

Richly pleasurable as it is, we do not perceive the utility of Mr. Wilstach's collection as an aid to writers, save for those who would willingly deal in the second-hand. For congressmen, political orators, very minor poets, third-rate editorial writers, fourth-rate clergymen, authors of best sellers, Chautauqua moralists—for all those who have a fatalistic conception of style—this book will be manna. But for self-respecting writers, it will be useful chiefly as a deterrent.

Wilstach addressed this issue in his usual breezy and whimsical style in the preface to the second edition of the book, in 1924:

… several reviewers expressed the fear that general use of this dictionary might incite the intellectual lacunæ to a slavish reliance. Such a contingency need not have been feared, nor has it been justified, except, possibly, in the case of musical comedy librettists. Certainly it was not my purpose to provide a grabbag out of which stencilled intellects might snatch tinselled phrases, scented sentiments, and jewelled periods.

Artists visit galleries, not for the purpose of making slavish copies of the masters, but rather to study technique. Collections of phrases, whether they be dictionaries of poetic or prose quotations, of proverbs, or of similes, may reasonably be regarded by literary artists as galleries where they may ramble, and possibly be tempted to originality. This dictionary, however, was not designed as a crutch for the dullard, but rather as a yeast for the platitudinarian.

== Legacy ==
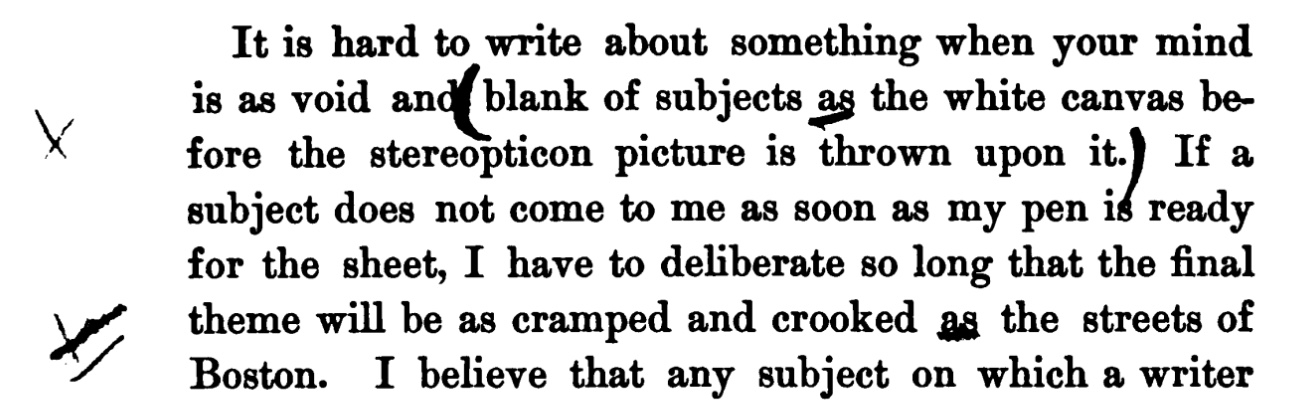
Two of many similes annotated in Wilstach's copy of Talks on Writing English by Arlo Bates which were included in A Dictionary of Similes.

Wilstach's diligence in compiling the dictionary won him praise. Joyce Kilmer, whose 1913 poem Trees began with one of the best known similes—"I think that I shall never see / A poem lovely as a tree"—wrote a lengthy profile of Wilstach for the New York Times Magazine with the subtitle "Frank J. Wilstach's Ardent and Relentless Hunt for This Elusive Figure of Speech Results in a Remarkable Collection."

Kilmer, who himself engaged in lexicographic work on Funk and Wagnalls' The Standard Dictionary, had provided pre-publication advice to Wilstach on his manuscript of the dictionary. Wilstach had also received advice from Ambrose Bierce, who he had known during his days in the Bay Area. In a 1908 letter to Wilstach, Bierce wrote "Luck to your project of publishing a book of Wilstachian thinglets. May its shadow be flung broadly athwart the land!"

Columnist Franklin P. Adams published a poem—"Lines on Reading Frank J. Wilstach's 'A Dictionary of Similes'"—in his syndicated column "The Conning Tower":

As neat as wax, as good as new,
As true as steel, as truth is true,
Good as a sermon, keen as hate,
Full as a tick, and fixed as fate—

Brief as a dream, long as the day,
Sweet as the rosy morn in May,
Chaste as the moon, as snow is white,
Broad as barn doors, and new as sight—

Useful as daylight, firm as stone,
Wet as a fish, dry as a bone,
Heavy as lead, light as a breeze—
Frank Wilstach's book of similes.

Following the publication of the enlarged 1924 edition, Wilstach continued to collect new similes, producing an annual selection of the best similes of the year that appeared in the Times and other papers. Several of his columns in the Times Magazine focused on similes and slang in specific fields, particularly theater and film.
