= Wadsworth Harris =

American actor

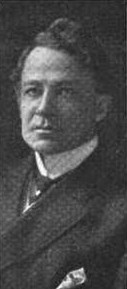
- Harris, 1904
- Born: October 9, 1864; Boston, Massachusetts
- Died: November 1, 1942 (aged 78); Los Angeles, California
- Occupation: Actor
- Years active: 1911-1936

Wadsworth Harris (October 9, 1864 – November 1, 1942) was an American actor of the silent era. He appeared in more than 40 films between 1911 and 1936. He was born in Boston, Massachusetts and died in Los Angeles, California from pneumonia.

== Filmography ==
Year	Title	Role	Notes
1912	A Soldier's Duty	Grace's Father	Short
1915	The Scarlet Sin	Doc White	
1915	Graft	Mark Gamble	Serial
1915	Tainted Money		
1916	The Dumb Girl of Portici	Duke d'Arcos	
1916	The Love Girl	The Swami	
1916	Love Never Dies	Monsieur Lescot	
1916	The Right to Be Happy	The Ghost of the Past	
1917	The Voice on the Wire	James Walsh	
1917	The Gift Girl	Marquis de Tonquin	
1917	The Hero of the Hour	Brooks Sr.	
1918	Madame Spy	Adm. John Wesley	
1918	The Kaiser, the Beast of Berlin	Gen. von Ruesselheim	
1918	Kidder & Ko	James Knight	
1918	All Night	Col. Lane	
1919	The Midnight Stage	Joe Statler	
1919	Loot	Arabin	
1920	The Dragon's Net	Doctor Redding	
1920	The Iron Rider	Sheriff Donovan	
1921	Rich Girl, Poor Girl	Vanderfleet	
1922	The Call of Home	Captain Wayne	
1934	One Night of Love	Judge	Uncredited
1936	The Plainsman	William Dennison	Uncredited
