= Madame Spy =

Madame Spy may refer to:

- Madame Spy (1918 film), an American silent film directed by Douglas Gerrard
- Madame Spy (1934 film), American adventure set during World War I; directed by Karl Freund
- Madame Spy (1942 film), American adventure set during World War II; directed by Roy William Neill
