= A Soldier's Duty =

1912 film

- Directed by: Charles Brabin
- Written by: Charles Brabin
- Starring: Augustus Phillips; Gertrude McCoy; George Lessey; Wadsworth Harris; Harry Linson
- Distributed by: Edison
- Release date: October 19, 1912
- Running time: 1000 ft (approx.)
- Country: United States
- Languages: Silent; English intertitles

A Soldier's Duty is a film produced by the Edison Company in 1912.

== Release ==
The film was released in the United States on October 19, 1912, and remained in circulation on the US screens through at least the following January.
