= The Greene Murder Case =

1928 novel by S.S. Van Dine

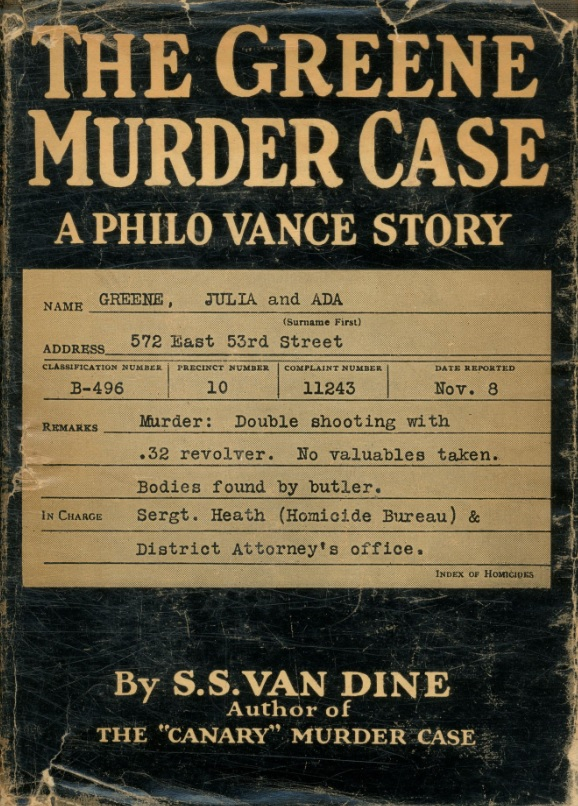
- First edition
- Author: S. S. Van Dine
- Language: English
- Series: Philo Vance
- Genre: Mystery, detective novel
- Publisher: Charles Scribner's
- Publication date: March 24, 1928
- Publication place: United States
- Media type: Print (hardback & paperback)
- Pages: 388 pp.
- Preceded by: The Canary Murder Case
- Followed by: The Bishop Murder Case

The Greene Murder Case is a 1928 mystery novel by S. S. Van Dine. It focuses on the murders, one by one, of members of the wealthy and contentious Greene family. This is the third in the series of Philo Vance whodunits, and the first of the Vance books not inspired by a real-life crime.

== Plot synopsis ==
Philo Vance takes a hand when, one evening, a daughter of the Greene family is shot to death and another one is wounded. The family comprises two sons and three daughters (the youngest, Ada, is adopted) under the rule of their mother, a bedridden invalid who spends her days feeling sorry for herself and cursing her ungrateful children. The family is required to live in the Greene mansion under the terms of their father's will. The German cook seems strangely attached to the adopted daughter; other hangers-on include the mother's physician, who is courting Sibella Greene, and the enigmatic butler. Later, the two Greene brothers and the mother are killed and the only family left are the two surviving daughters, jaunty modern Sibella and shy Ada, against whom two murder attempts have been made. The murders are complicated by sets of mysterious footprints appearing in the snow, which seem to have been made in an impossible way and by the suggestion that the paralyzed mother has been seen walking in the halls. Philo Vance reduces the facts of the case to just under a hundred paragraphs, sets them in order, and solves the case.

== Literary significance and criticism ==
The Greene Murder Case became the number-four bestseller in the United States during its first year of publication.

== Film adaptations ==
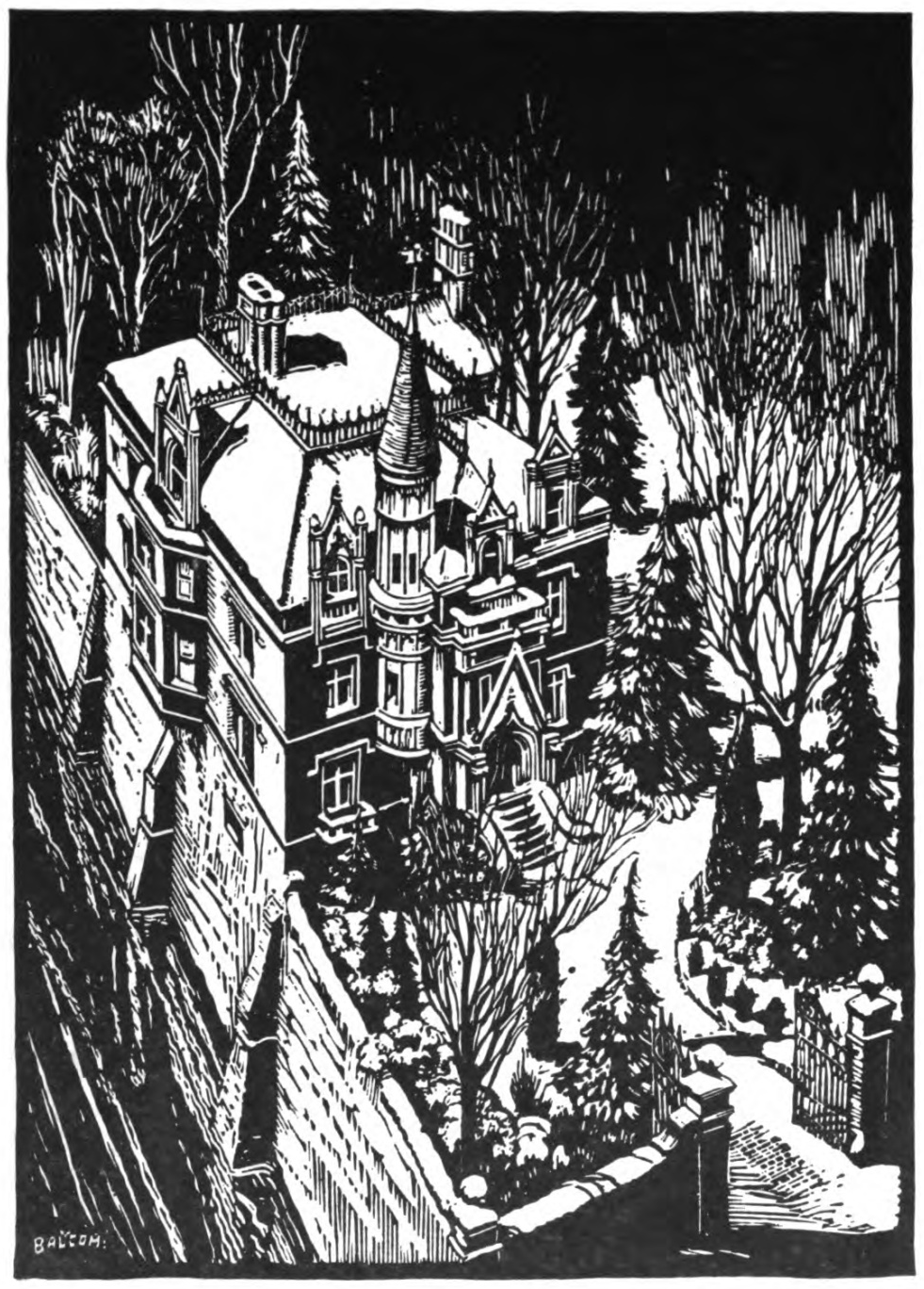
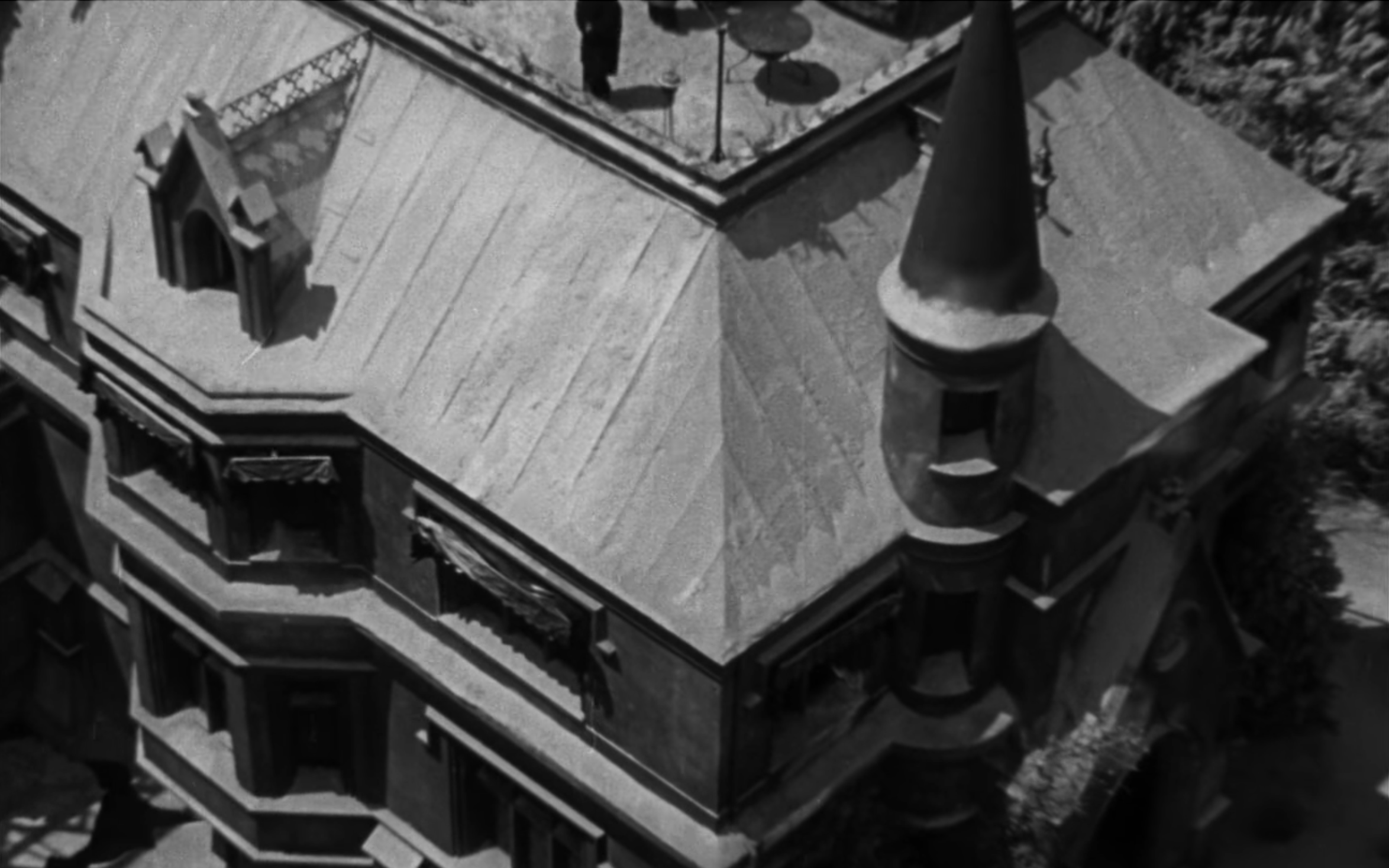
The Greene Mansion, in New York City, as it appears in an overhead shot both in the novel (left) and in the 1929 film adaptation (right)

The Greene Murder Case (1929) starred William Powell as Philo Vance. Another version, entitled Night of Mystery (1937), was based on The Greene Murder Case and starred Grant Richards as Philo Vance. Reportedly, no prints exist outside of university/museum collections. Czech Television produced a film titled Vyvraždění rodiny Greenů in 2002, directed by Jiří Strach and starring Jiří Dvořák as Philo Vance.
