= A Doctor's Diary =

1937 film by Charles Vidor

- Theatrical release poster
- Directed by: Charles Vidor
- Screenplay by: David Boehm; Samuel Ornitz
- Story by: Joseph Anthony; Samuel Ornitz
- Produced by: B. P. Schulberg
- Starring: George Bancroft; Helen Burgess; John Trent; Ruth Coleman; Ronald Sinclair; Molly Lamont
- Edited by: Richard C. Currier
- Music by: Harry Fischbeck
- Production company: Paramount Pictures
- Distributed by: Paramount Pictures
- Release date: January 22, 1937
- Running time: 77 minutes
- Country: United States
- Language: English

A Doctor's Diary is a 1937 American drama film directed by Charles Vidor and written by David Boehm and Samuel Ornitz. The film stars George Bancroft, Helen Burgess, John Trent, Ruth Coleman, Ronald Sinclair and Molly Lamont. The film was released on January 22, 1937, by Paramount Pictures.

== Cast ==
- George Bancroft as Dr. Clem Driscoll
- Helen Burgess as Ruth Hanlon
- John Trent as Dr. Dan Norris
- Ruth Coleman as Catherine Stanwood
- Ronald Sinclair as Michael Fielding
- Molly Lamont as Mrs. Fielding
- Sidney Blackmer as Dr. Anson Ludlow
- Charles Waldron as Dr. Ellery Stanwood
- Frank Puglia as Louie
- Milburn Stone as Fred Clark
- Sue Carol as Mrs. Mason
