= King of Gamblers =

1937 film by Robert Florey

- Directed by: Robert Florey; John E. Burch (assistant)
- Written by: Doris Anderson
- Cinematography: Harry Fischbeck
- Edited by: Harvey Johnston
- Music by: Score: Boris Morros; Gerard Carbonara; Songs: Ralph Rainger (music); Richard A. Whiting (music); Burton Lane (music); Leo Robin (lyrics); Ralph Freed (lyrics)
- Distributed by: Paramount Pictures
- Release date: April 23, 1937
- Running time: 78 minutes
- Country: United States
- Language: English

King of Gamblers is a 1937 American crime film directed by Robert Florey and starring Claire Trevor, Lloyd Nolan and Buster Crabbe. Akim Tamiroff takes an unusual featured role as a slot-machine racketeer whose bombing of an uncooperative barber shop leads to a murder charge. (The film was also known as Czar of the Slot Machines.)

By her own account, silent film star Louise Brooks played a bit part in the film for Florey, who "specialised in giving jobs to destitute and sufficiently grateful actresses", referring both to herself and to Evelyn Brent. Despite the fact her name appears in the studio campaign book, Brooks does not appear in the completed film.

== Cast ==
- Claire Trevor as Dixie Moore
- Lloyd Nolan as Jim Adams
- Akim Tamiroff as Steve Kalkas
- Buster Crabbe as Eddie
- Helen Burgess as Jackie Nolan
- Porter Hall as George Kramer
- Barlowe Borland as Mr. Parker
- Purnell Pratt as Strohm
- Colin Tapley as Joe
- Paul Fix as Charlie
- Cecil Cunningham as Big Edna
- Fay Holden as Nurse
- Evelyn Brent as Cora
- Louise Brooks as Joyce Beaton (scenes deleted)

== Critical reception ==
Frank S. Nugent of the The New York Times wrote, "Unscrupulous editing and the conscienceless substitution of camera angles and mechanical dissolves for ideas and genuine suspense have made a superficially presentable melodrama out of King of Gamblers." He wrote that audiences unable to accept Lloyd Nolan in a romantic role "may be consoled by the presence of Claire Trevor."

Variety commented that the film was well enough made to be worth seeing, but felt that the storyline too closely resembled that of the recently released Bette Davis film, Marked Woman. The performances of Claire Trevor and Lloyd Nolan were well received.
