= Simile =

Figure of speech marked by explicit comparison

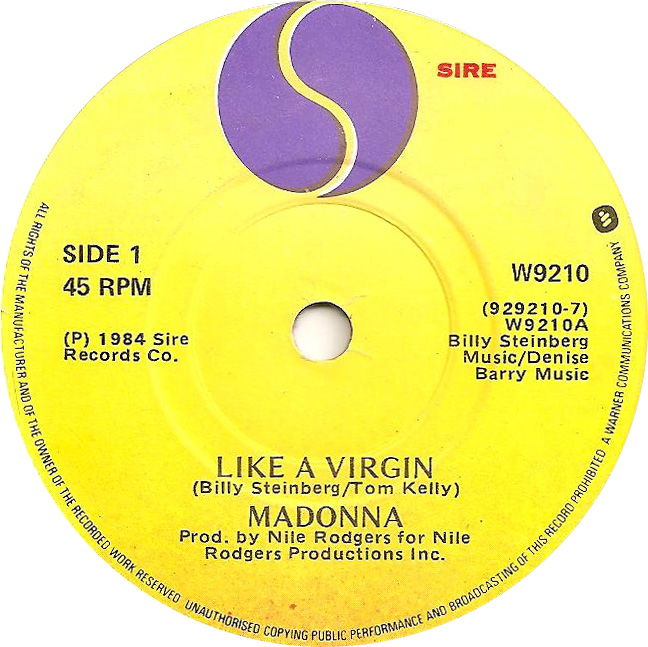
The Madonna album Like a Virgin, in whose title track the narrative persona uses a simile, professing to be experiencing an erotic relationship "like a virgin".

A simile (/ˈsɪmɪli/) is a type of figure of speech that directly compares two unrelated things, using wording to explicitly make the comparison (often, with a grammatical structure of the type "x is like y"). It is usually understood specifically to entail figurative comparison: thus "a wolf is like a dog" is merely a literal comparison, whereas the figurative "a man is like a wolf" is a simile. In the words of Michael Israel, Jennifer Riddle Harding, and Vera Tobin, "basically, a simile is just a way of describing a target by asserting its similarity to some unexpected entity".

In English, similes are often made explicit by the word "like", as in "Odysseus is like a weasel", but the comparison in a simile can be made explicit in quite different ways, as in "the retirement of Yves Saint Laurent is the fashion equivalent of the breakup of the Beatles". Sometimes, extra information is included to explain precisely how the comparison is intended to work, as in "my kitchen is approximately the size of a postage stamp".

== Definition ==
Similes are often compared (or contrasted) with metaphors. Similes compare two things explicitly, in English often using the words "like" or "as", whereas metaphors often create an implicit comparison (i.e., saying something "is" something else). Thus Odysseus is a weasel is a metaphor, while Odysseus is like a weasel is a simile.

However, there are two schools of thought regarding the relationship between similes and metaphors. The first defines them as opposites, such that a statement cannot be both a simile and a metaphor — if it uses a comparison word such as "like" then it is a simile; if not, it is a metaphor. The second school considers metaphor to be the broader category, in which similes are a subcategory — according to which every simile is also a metaphor (but not vice-versa). These two schools reflect differing definitions and usages of the word "metaphor" and regardless of whether it encompasses similes, both agree that similes always involve a direct comparison word such as "like" or "as".

The word simile derives from the Latin word similis ("similar, like"), while metaphor derives from the Greek word metaphérō (Ancient Greek: μεταφέρω), meaning "to transfer". As in the case of metaphors, the thing that is being compared is called the tenor, and the thing it is being compared to is called the vehicle. Author and lexicographer Frank J. Wilstach compiled a dictionary of similes in 1916, with a second edition in 1924.

== Uses ==
=== In literature ===
Sometimes similes and metaphors function in much the same way, as in "O My Luve's like a red, red rose" in the Robert Burns poem "A Red, Red Rose": this could be turned into the metaphor "my love is a red rose" without confusing the reader. However, because similes are explicit, it is possible for them to be more elaborate than metaphors while remaining comprehensible, as in the following examples:

- John Milton, Paradise Lost, a Homeric simile:
  As when a prowling Wolf, ::Whom hunger drives to seek new haunt for prey, ::Watching where Shepherds pen their Flocks at eve ::In hurdl'd Cotes amid the field secure, ::Leaps o'er the fence with ease into the Fold: ::. . . . . . . ::So clomb this first grand Thief into God's Fold
- William Shakespeare, The Merchant of Venice:

How far that little candle throws his beams!
So shines a good deed in a naughty world.

Stopping her from going was like trying to catch a bullet with a pair of tweasers, impossible.

Learning to drive was like a deer learning how to walk for the first time. Stumbling until you get it right.

Authors sometimes use similes to establish a comparison explicitly, using metaphors thereafter once the comparison has been established (the same process can happen in everyday conversations, either with the metaphor or the simile coming first).

=== In comedy ===
Similes are used extensively in British comedy, notably in the slapstick era of the 1960s and 1970s. In comedy, the simile is often used in negative style: "he was as daft as a brush." They are also used in a comedic context where a sensitive subject is broached, and the comedian will test the audience with a response to a subtle implicit simile before going deeper. The sitcom Blackadder featured the use of extended similes, normally said by the title character. For example:

Baldrick: I have a plan, sir.
Blackadder: Really, Baldrick? A cunning and subtle one?
Baldrick: Yes, sir.
Blackadder: As cunning as a fox who's just been appointed Professor of Cunning at Oxford University?

== In languages other than English ==
Given that similes emphasize affinities between different objects, they occur in many cultures and languages.

=== Arabic ===
Sayf al-Din al-Amidi discussed Arabic similes in 1805: "On Substantiation Through Transitive Relations".

=== Vietnamese ===
Thuy Nga Nguyen and Ghil'ad Zuckermann (2012) classify Vietnamese similes into two types: Meaning Similes and Rhyming Similes.

The following is an example:

Nghèo như con mèo
/ŋɛu ɲɯ kɔn mɛu/
"Poor as a cat"

Whereas the above Vietnamese example is of a rhyming simile, the English simile "(as) poor as a church mouse" is only a semantic simile.

== See also ==
- Alliteration
- Analogy
- Description
- Figure of speech
- Homeric simile
- Hyperbole
- Hypocatastasis
- Like (as a preposition used in comparisons)
- Metaphor
- Metonymy
- Personification
- Phono-semantic matching
- Tautology (language)
- Simile aria
