= Epithets in Homer =

Characteristic of the poetic style of Homer

A characteristic of Homer's style is the use of epithets, as in "swift-footed" Achilles or "rosy-fingered" Eos (the personification of dawn). Epithets are used because of the constraints of the dactylic hexameter (i.e., it is convenient to have a stockpile of metrically fitting phrases to add to a name) and because of the oral transmission of the poems; they are mnemonic aids to the singer and the audience alike.

Formulae in epic poetry from various Indo-European traditions may be traced to a common tradition. For example, the phrase for "everlasting glory" or "undying fame" can be found in the Homeric Greek as κλέος ἄφθιτον / kléos áphthiton and Vedic Sanskrit as श्रवो अक्षितम् / śrávo ákṣitam. These two phrases were, in terms of historical linguistics, equivalent in phonology, accentuation, and quantity (syllable length). In other words, they descend from a fragment of poetic diction (reconstructable as Proto-Indo-European *ḱléwos ń̥dʰgʷʰitom) which was handed down in parallel over many centuries, in continually diverging forms, by generations of singers whose ultimate ancestors shared an archetypal repertoire of poetic formulae and narrative themes.

In contrast to the more general term 'epithet' (ἐπίθετον), which is used in poetic contexts, for the ancient Greek religion, the epiclesis (epíklēsis, ἐπίκλησις, literally 'calling upon') was used as the surname that was associated with a deity during religious invocations.

Epithets alter the meaning of each noun to which they are attached. They specify the existential nature of a noun; that is to say, Achilles is not called "swift-footed" only when he runs; it is a marker of a quality that does not change. Special epithets, such as patronymics, are used exclusively for particular subjects and distinguish them from others, while generic epithets are used of many subjects and speak less to their individual characters. In these examples, the epithet can be contradictory to the present state of the subject: in Odyssey VI.74, for instance, Nausicaa takes her "radiant clothing" (ἐσθῆτα φαεινήν) to be washed; since it is dirty, it is unlikely to be radiant.

== List ==
=== General ===
General epithets are applied to common nouns, or the people or things that fall under such a noun. For example, Odysseus, Achilles, and Agamemnon are all referred to as "brilliant" (a general epithet for men) at various points.

- men
  - shining, divine (δῖος, dîos)
  - born from Zeus (διογενής, diogenḗs)
  - god-like (ἀντίθεος, antítheos; θεοειδής, theoeidḗs)
  - high-hearted
  - brilliant (dios)
- leaders
  - lord of men (ἄναξ ἀνδρῶν, ánax andrôn)
- women (incl. goddesses)
  - white-armed (λευκώλενος, leukṓlenos)
  - lovely-haired (ἐυπλοκάμις, ἐυπλόκαμος, euplokámis, euplókamos)
  - ox eyed (βοῶπις, boôpis)
- goddesses
  - of the golden distaff with (χρυσηλάκατος, khrusēlákatos)
- day
  - the day of return (νόστιμον ἦμαρ, nóstimon êmar — nostalgia also comes from nóstos)
- earth
  - life-giving (φυσίζοος, physízoos)
- sea
  - loud-roaring (πολυφλοίσβοιο θαλάσσης)
  - grey
  - wine-colored, wine-dark (οἶνοψ)
- ships
  - well-balanced
  - swift
  - black
- lions
  - eating raw flesh (ὠμόφαγος)
  - mountain-bred (ὀρεσίτροφος)
  - fiery (αἴθων)
- spears
  - sharp (ὀξύς)
  - long-shadowed (δολιχόσκιος)
  - brazen (χαλκηρής)

==== Nations ====
- Abantes
  - swift (θοοί, thooí)
  - sporting long hair (ὄπιθεν κομόωντες, ópithen komóōntes)
- Achaeans
  - hairy-headed (κάρη κομόωντες, kárē komóōntes)
  - bronzed-armored (χαλκο-χίτωνες, chalko-chítōnes)
  - strong-greaved (ἐυ-κνήμιδες, eü-knḗmides)
  - glancing-eyed (ἑλίκ-ωπες, helík-ōpes)
  - with hollow ships
- Carians
  - who spoke a foreign tongue (βαρβαρόφωνος, barbarophonos)
- Trojans
  - tamers of horses (ἱπποδάμοι, hippodámoi)
- Phaeacians
  - oar-loving

=== Individuals ===
- Achilles
  - son of Peleus (Πηληϊάδης Pēlēïádēs)
  - swift-footed (πόδας ὠκύς pódas ōkús; ποδ-άρκης pod-arkēs; ποδ-ώκεος pod-ṓkeos)
  - breaking through men (ῥηξ-ήνωρ rhēx-ḗnōr)
  - lion-hearted (θῡμο-λέοντα thūmo-léonta)
  - like to the gods (θεοῖς ἐπιείκελος theoîs epieíkelos)
  - shepherd of the people (ποιμήν λαῶν poimḗn laôn)
- Aeneas
  - son of Anchises (Ἀγχῑσιάδης Anchīsiádēs)
  - counselor of the Trojans (Τρώων βουληφόρος Trṓōn boulēphóros)
  - lord of the Trojans (Τρώων ἀγός Trṓōn agós)
  - great-hearted (Mεγαλήτωρ megaletor)
  - great-minded (Μεγάθυμος megathymos)
  - king of men (Ἂναξ ἀνδρών anax andron)
  - great (Μέγας megas)
- Agamede
  - fair-haired, red-haired, flaming-haired (ξανθός, xanthos)
- Agamemnon
  - breaker of horses, horse-tamer (ἱππό-δαμος hippó-damos)
  - son of Atreus (Ἀτρείδης Atreídēs: also transliterated Atrīdēs)
  - wide-ruling lord (εὐρὺ κρείων eurù kreíōn)
  - the lord marshal
  - powerful
  - shepherd of the people (ποιμὴν λαῶν poimḗn laôn)
  - lord of men (ἄναξ ἀνδρῶν ánax andrôn)
- Aias/Ajax
  - Son of Telamon (Τελαμώνιος Telamṓnios)
  - swift
  - gigantic (πελώριος pelṓrios)
    - the mighty
- Alcinous
  - the hallowed prince
  - great
- Andromache
  - daughter of Eetion (θυγάτηρ Ἠετίωνος thugátēr Ēetíōnos)
  - white-armed (λευκώλενος, leukṓlenos)
- Antilochus
  - a man of good judgement (πέπνυμαι pepnumenos)
- Aphrodite
  - Cytherean (Κυθέρεια)
  - laughter-loving (φιλομμειδής philommeidḗs)
  - daughter of Zeus (Διὸς θυγάτηρ Diòs thugátēr)
  - goddess of love
  - fair (δῖα dîa)
- Apollo
  - Phoebus, i.e. the Bright or Pure, (Φοῖβος Phoebus)
  - with unshorn hair; i.e., ever-young (ἀ-κερσε-κόμης a-kerse-komēs)
  - destroyer of mice (Σμινθεύς Smintheus)
  - distant deadly Archer (ἑκηβόλος hekēbólos)
  - far-aiming lord (ἑκατηβελέτης ἄναξ hekatēbelétēs ánax)
  - Lycian-born (Λυκηγενής)
  - rouser of armies
  - son of Zeus (Διὸς υἱός Diòs huiós)
  - of the silver bow (ἀργυρότοξος argyrótoxos)
  - famous with the bow (κλυτοτόξος klutotóxos)
  - whom the sleek-haired Leto has born (τὸν ἠΰκομος τέκε Λητώ tòn ēǘkomos téke Lētṓ)
- Ares
  - slayer of men (ἀνδρειφόντης andreiphóntēs)
  - sacker of cities (πτολι-πόρθιος ptoli-pórthios)
  - bronzen (χάλκεος khálkeos)
  - furious (θοῦρος thoûros)
  - destroyer of city walls (τειχεσιπλήτης teichesiplḗtēs)
  - of the glinting helmet
- Ariadne
  - lovely-haired (καλλιπλόκαμος kalliplókamos)
- Artemis
  - the archer-goddess
  - shooter of arrows (ἰοχέαιρα iokhéaira)
- Athena
  - Pallas (Παλλάς Pallás)
  - gray-, bright-eyed (γλαυκ-ῶπις glauk-ôpis)
  - daughter of Zeus
  - third-born of the gods
  - Tritogeneia (Τριτογένεια)
  - whose shield is thunder
  - hope of soldiers
  - tireless one (Ἀτρυτώνη Atrytone)
  - who gathers the spoils (ἀγελείη ageleiē)
- Briseis
  - beautiful-, fair-cheeked (καλλιπάρῃος kalliparēios)
  - fair-haired (ἠΰκομος ēǘkomos)
- Calypso
  - beautiful nymph
  - softly-braided nymph
  - divine
  - goddess most divinely made
  - daughter of Atlas
  - cunning goddess (δεινὴ θεός deinē theos)
- Charybdis
  - dreaded
- Chryseis
  - beautiful, fair-cheeked (καλλιπάρῃος kallipárēios)
- Circe
  - enchantress
  - shining among goddesses, bright among goddesses
  - the dread goddess
  - who talks with mortals
  - Aeaean
- Cronus (Kronos)
  - crooked-counselling, devious-devising (ἀγκυλομήτης ankulomḗtēs)
  - all-powerful
- Demeter
  - fair-haired
- Diomede
  - of the beautiful cheeks (καλλιπάρηος, kallipáreios)
- Diomedes
  - son of Tydeus
  - great spearman
  - master of the war cry
  - god-like
  - strong
  - breaker of horses, horse-taming (ἱππό-δαμος hippó-damos)
- Eos
  - Rosy-fingered (ῥοδοδάκτυλος rhododáktulos)
  - Early-born (Erigeneia)
  - Of the golden throne
- Eumaeus
  - swineherd (συβώτης, sybṓtēs)
- Hector
  - tall
  - shepherd of the people
  - of the glinting helmet, of the shining helm (κορυθ-αίολος koruth-aiolos)
  - man-killing
  - breaker of horses, horse-taming (ἱππό-δαμος hippó-damos)
  - dear to Zeus
  - glorious (phaidimos)
- Helen
  - daughter of a noble house
  - Daughter of Zeus who holds the aegis
  - long-dressed
- Helios
  - who brings joy to mortals
  - the sun god
  - who sees all things and listens to all things, all seeing and all hearing
  - brilliant
  - Hyperion (Ὑπερίων)
- Hera
  - ox-eyed lady (βοῶπις πότνια boôpis pótnia)
- Hephaestus
  - the famous craftsman
  - the famous lame god
  - of the strong arms
- Hermes
  - messenger of the gods and conductor of men (διάκτορος diáktoros)
  - slayer of Argos (Ἀργειφόντης Argeiphóntēs)
  - son of Zeus
  - giant-killer
  - the strong one
  - keen eyes emissary
- Icarius
  - great-hearted (μεγαλ-ήτωρ megal-ḗtōr)
- Idomeneus
  - loving manliness, manly (ἀγαπήνορος, agapēnoros)
- Ino
  - lovely-ankled (καλλίσφυρος kallísphuros)
- Iphis
  - of the lovely girdle (εὔζωνος, eúzōnos)
- Iris
  - wind-footed
- Meleager
  - fair-haired, red-haired, flaming-haired (ξανθός, xanthos)
- Menelaus
  - fair-haired, red-haired, flaming-haired (ξανθός, xanthos)
  - master of the war-cry
  - son of Atreus (Ἀτρείδης Atreídes)
  - spear-famed
  - loved by Ares, war-like (ἀρηΐφιλος arēïphilos)
  - cherished by Zeus (διοτρεφές diotrephés)
- Naubolos
  - great-hearted (πτολι-πόρθιος ptoli-pórthios)
- Nestor
  - breaker of horses, horse-tamer (ἱππό-δαμος hippó-damos)
  - Godly
  - Gerenian charioteer
  - son of Neleus (Νηληιάδης Nēlēiádēs)
  - Pylos born king
  - sweet spoken
  - wise old (γέρων)
- Odysseus
  - resourceful, man of many resources, of many turns, man of twists and turns (πολύ-τροπος polú-tropos)
  - much-enduring, long suffering (πολύ-τλᾱς polú-tlās)
  - great-hearted (μεγαλ-ήτωρ megal-ḗtōr)
  - sacker of cities, raider (πτολι-πόρθιος ptoli-pórthios)
  - son of Laertes (Λαερτιάδης Laertiádēs)
  - wise
  - loved of Zeus
  - great glory of the Achaeans
  - master mariner
  - mastermind of war
  - hotheaded
  - honored
  - man of action
  - the great teller of tales
  - man of exploits
  - man of pain
  - that kingly man
  - hero (ἥρωϊ hḗrōï)
  - the great tactician
  - cunning (πολύ-μητις polú-mētis)
- Onchestos
  - sacred
- Pandaros
  - son of Lykaon
- Patroclus
  - son of Menoitius (Μενοιτιάδης Menoitiádēs)
  - Zeus-born, sprung from Zeus (διογενές)
  - dear to Zeus (Ζεύς φίλος)
  - great-hearted (μεγαλήτωρ megalḗtōr)
  - horseman (ἱπποκέλευθε hippokéleuthe or ἱππεύς hippeús)
  - peerless (ἀμύμονος)
  - peer to gods in counsel (θεόφιν μήστωρ ἀτάλαντος theóphin mḗstōr atálantos)
  - gentle (ἐνηείης)
  - hero (ἥρωϊ hḗrōï)
- Paris
  - Alexandros
  - magnificent
- Penelope
  - cautious
  - careful
  - circumspect (περίφρων, perĭ́phrōn)
  - daughter of Icarius
  - discreet
  - temperate
  - wise
  - self-obsessed
- Poseidon
  - earth-shaker (ἐννοσίγαιος ennosí-gaios or ἐνοσί-χθων enosí-chthōn)
  - earth-moving, earth-carrying (γαιή-οχος gaiḗ-ochos)
- Rhadamanthys
  - fair-haired, red-haired, flaming-haired (ξανθός, xanthos)
- Sarpedon
  - leader of the Lycians
- Suitors
  - swaggering
  - haughty
- Telemachus
  - poised
  - thoughtful
  - prudent
- Thetis
  - silver-footed
- Thersites
  - of the endless speech
- Thyestes
  - rich in flocks (πολύαρνος)
- Tiresias
  - the blind prophet
  - the Theban
- Tydeus
  - driver of horses
- Zeus
  - mighty
  - son of Kronos (Κρονίδης Kronídēs)
  - wide-seeing
  - cloud-gatherer, who marshals the thunderheads (νεφελη-γερέτᾱ nephelē-gerétā)
  - father of gods and men (πατὴρ ἀνδρῶν τε θεῶν τε patḕr andrôn te theôn te, Iliad 11.182)
  - of the dazzling bolt (ἀργι-κέραυνος argi-kéraunos)
  - loud-thundering (ἐρί-γδουπος ἐρί-δουπος erí-gdoupos, erí-doupos)
  - delighting in thunder (τερπι-κέραυνος terpi-kéraunos)
  - dark-clouded
  - aegis-holding (αἰγί-οχος aigí-ochos)
  - of the counsels (metieta)
  - of the wide brows, wide browed (euryopa)

==== Shared ====
- Paris, Hector, Polites
  - son of Priam (Πριαμίδης Priamídēs)
- Antilochus, Pisistratus
  - son of Nestor (Νεστορίδης Nestorídēs)
- Agamemnon, Menelaus
  - son of Atreus (Ἀτρείδης Atreídēs)
- Hector, Agamemnon, Atreus, Diomedes, Nestor
  - breaker of horses, horse-tamer (ἱππό-δαμος hippó-damos)
- Agamemnon, Achilles, Diomedes
  - best of the Achaeans
- Hector, Ares
  - man-slaughtering
- Diomedes, Menelaus
  - master of the war-cry
- Athena, Zeus
  - aegis-holding (αἰγί-οχος aigí-ochos)
- Meleager, Menelaus, Rhadamanthys
  - fair-haired, red-haired, flaming-haired (ξανθός, xanthos)

== See also ==
- Homeric simile – another common Homeric device
- List of kennings – kennings in Icelandic, Old Norse, and Old English
- Makurakotoba – epithets in classical Japanese

== Sources ==
- Parry, Milman. "L'Épithète traditionnelle dans Homère: Essai sur un problème de style homérique." Paris: Société d'Éditions "Les Belles Lettres", 1928.
- Parry, Milman, ed. Adam Parry. "The Making of Homeric Verse: The Collected Papers of Milman Parry." Oxford: The Clarendon Press, 1971.
- Edwards, Mark. "Homer and the Oral Tradition: The Formula (part one)." Oral Tradition 1 (1986) 171-230.
- Edwards, Mark. "Homer and the Oral Tradition: The Formula (part two)." Oral Tradition 3 (1988) 11-60.
- Reece, Steve. "Greek Epic Formulae," in Giorgios Giannakis (ed.), Encyclopedia of Ancient Greek Language and Linguistics (Leiden: Brill, 2014) 613-615. Greek_Epic_Formulas
- Reece, Steve. "Epithets," in Margalit Finkelberg (ed.), Homeric Encyclopedia (Oxford: Blackwell, 2011) 257-259. Epithets
- V.J. Howe, "Epithets in Homer." Available online at https://www.angelfire.com/art/archictecture/articles/008.htm. (Retrieved October 16, 2007.)
- Fagles, Robert. "The Odyssey." Penguin Books, 1996.
