= Helen Burgess =

American actress (1916–1937)

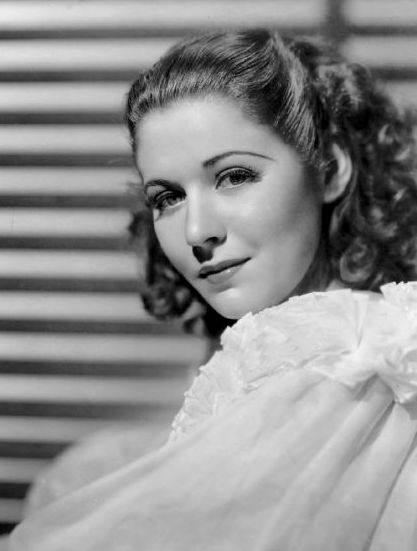
- Burgess in a 1936 headshot
- Born: Helen Margarite Burgess; April 26, 1916; Portland, Oregon, U.S.
- Died: April 7, 1937 (aged 20); Los Angeles, California, U.S.
- Occupation: Actress
- Years active: 1936–1937
- Spouse: Herbert Rutherford (m. 1937)

Helen Margarite Burgess (April 26, 1916 – April 7, 1937) was an American film and stage actress. Discovered by Cecil B. DeMille, she began her acting career in 1936 at age nineteen, playing Louisa Cody in DeMille's Western biopic The Plainsman. She would appear in four films as a contract player for Paramount Pictures before dying at age twenty from pneumonia.

== Life and career ==
=== Early life ===
Helen Margarite Burgess was born in Portland, Oregon in 1916, the daughter of Frank T. and Estella "Fanny" L. (née Hayden) Burgess. Her father worked as a district agent for the Metropolitan Life Insurance Company of New York. She had one younger sister, Mary. Burgess was raised primarily in Tacoma, Washington after her father's job was transferred from Portland to Seattle.

She attended the Annie Wright School in Tacoma, and was described as a shy child. In 1926, the family relocated again to Los Angeles, California, where Burgess attended Los Angeles High School and later University High School. She also attended Clark's Los Angeles Dramatic School with aspirations to become a stage actress.

=== Film career ===
While starring in a play in Los Angeles, titled The Seventh Year, Burgess was approached by Jack Murton, a talent scout for Paramount Pictures. While visiting the studio, she was approached by Cecil B. DeMille, who at the time was looking to cast a supporting part in The Plainsman (1936). Burgess auditioned for the part of Louisa Cody, opposite James Ellison, and was cast by DeMille. DeMille was quoted on his casting of Burgess: "I broke a rule of 25 years' standing when I chose Miss Burgess for the part of Louisa Cody. It was the first time that I have cast a player without previous screen experience in an important role. But, as soon as I saw Miss Burgess, I realized that she had the making of a strong and appealing screen personality."

On January 3, 1937, journalist Eleanor Packer wrote an article on Burgess in a syndicated Los Angeles newspaper, noting:

The surprising thing about Helen’s sudden leap from obscurity into fame is the fact that she has no trace of the startling, dramatic beauty which the world associates with Hollywood actresses. She is almost what is called ‘plain,’ or ‘homely.’ She would pass unnoticed in a crowd of most typical Hollywood girls. Why then did DeMille pick her out? She has something greater than mere beauty. Something more important to the screen than a standardized prettiness. She possesses what cameramen call a ‘photogenic face,’ one capable of revealing ‘inner emotions’ to the eye of the camera.

In 1937, she was cast as a lead in Charles Vidor's A Doctor's Diary, opposite George Bancroft. This was followed by a role in Paramount's low-budget crime film King of Gamblers (1937), directed by Robert Florey, in which she played a young woman being terrorized by mobsters. Her final film credit was in E.A. Dupont's Night of Mystery (1937).

=== Marriage and death ===
Burgess eloped with Herbert Rutherford, a piano instructor, on January 27, 1937 in Yuma, Arizona; the marriage lasted two months, and was annulled on March 15, 1937. Two weeks later, on April 1, 1937, she contracted a cold while on the set of Night of Mystery. Over the ensuing week, Burgess's condition worsened, to the point that she was hospitalized with lobar pneumonia. On the morning of April 7, she was placed in an oxygen tent; she would die later that evening at her home in Hollywood. During her funeral on April 9, the crew of Night of Mystery were forced to continue filming "around" the scenes she had been unable to complete. At the time of her death, Burgess was scheduled to appear as the lead opposite George Raft in Fritz Lang's You and Me (1938).

She is interred at Forest Lawn Memorial Park in Glendale, California.

== Filmography ==
| Year | Title | Role | Notes | Ref. |
|---|---|---|---|---|
| 1936 | The Plainsman | Louisa Cody | | |
| 1937 | A Doctor's Diary | Ruth Hanlon | | |
| 1937 | King of Gamblers | Jackie Nolan | | |
| 1937 | Night of Mystery | Ada Greene | (final film role) | |

== Sources ==
- Ellenberger, Allan R. (2001). Celebrities in Los Angeles Cemeteries: A Directory. Jefferson, North Carolina: McFarland. ISBN 978-0-786-40983-9.
- Hoffmann, Henryk (2009). Western Film Highlights: The Best of the West, 1914–2001. Jefferson, North Carolina: McFarland. ISBN 978-1-476-60865-5.
- Kear, Lynn; King, James (2009). Evelyn Brent: The Life and Films of Hollywood's Lady Crook. Jefferson, North Carolina: McFarland. ISBN 978-0-786-44363-5.
- Vermilye, Jerry (2014). Buster Crabbe: A Biofilmography. Jefferson, North Carolina: McFarland. ISBN 978-0-786-49570-2.
- Wagner, Laura (2020). Hollywood's Hard-Luck Ladies: 23 Actresses Who Suffered Early Deaths, Accidents, Missteps, Illnesses and Tragedies. Jefferson, North Carolina: McFarland. ISBN 978-1-4766-3833-1.
