= Hypocatastasis =

Resemblance between one stated and one implied noun

Hypocatastasis is a figure of speech that declares or implies a resemblance, representation or comparison. It differs from a metaphor, because in a metaphor the two nouns are both named and given; while, in hypocatastasis, only one is named and the other is implied, or as it were, is put down underneath out of sight. Hence hypocatastasis is an implied resemblance or representation: that is an implied simile or metaphor. A hypocatastasis has more force than a metaphor or simile, and expresses as it were a superlative degree of resemblance.

Attribution for the creation of the term is given derisively to a Mr. Lord by G. Bush in 1850. The latter accuses the former of inventing this category of Biblical comparisons which do not seem to fit into the standard categories of metaphor or simile. Since then the term has mostly been confined to analysis of Biblical rhetoric, and it has never migrated to general public usage. It does not appear in the 2009 version of the Oxford English Dictionary.

Bush says of Lord's term:

The Hypocatastasis is the substitution, without a formal notice, of agents and objects of one sphere, or of one species, in the place of the persons or objects of another, as in Is. iii. 15, "What mean ye that ye crush my people, and grind the faces of the poor?" These acts, says Mr. L., are not literally impracticable, and therefore are not used metaphorically. They are violent and extraordinary, and are employed by substitution, to signify analogous acts of extreme oppression and tyranny. [Italics in original]

Bullinger gives the following example: one may say to another, “You are like a beast.” This would be simile, tamely stating a fact. If, however, he said, “You are a beast” that would be metaphor. But, if he said simply, “Beast!” that would be hypocatastasis, for the other part of the simile or metaphor (“you”), would be implied and not stated. This figure, therefore, is calculated to arouse the mind and attract and excite the attention to the greatest extent.

== See also ==
- Analogy
- Description
- Metaphor
- Poetry
