= Cinema Rex bombing =

Cinema in Antwerp, Belgium, hit by V-2 rocket in World War II

Coordinates: 51.2181°N 4.4174°E

- Part of the Western Front and strategic bombing during World War II
- Location: Cinema Rex, Belgium
- Date: 16 December 1944
- Attack type: Aerial bombing; Rocket attack
- Weapon: 1 V-2 Rocket
- Deaths: 567 killed: 271 civilians; 296 Allied military personnel
- Injuries: 194 Allied military personnel Unknown number of civilians
- Perpetrator: (Nazi Germany) Wehrmacht

Cinema Rex was a cinema located at De Keyserlei 15 in Antwerp, Belgium. It opened in 1935 and was designed by Leon Stynen, a Belgian architect, modeled after large American movie theatres.

On 16 December 1944 (the first day of the Ardennes Offensive), at 15:20, a V-2 rocket fired from The Netherlands (Hellendoorn) by the SS Werfer Battery 500 directly landed on the roof of the cinema during a showing of The Plainsman. There were approximately 1,100 people inside the cinema and the explosion killed 567 people including 296 Allied servicemen (194 further servicemen were injured) and 11 buildings in total destroyed. Up to 74 Belgian children were killed too.

It took nearly a week to dig all the bodies out of the rubble. It was the single highest death total from a single rocket attack during the war. Following the attack all public performance venues were closed and the town council ordered that a maximum of 50 people were allowed to congregate in any one location.

The theatre was re-built in 1947 but closed in 1993 and was demolished in 1995.
