= Night of Mystery (1937 film) =

1937 film by Ewald André Dupont

- Directed by: E.A. Dupont
- Screenplay by: Frank Partos; Gladys Unger
- Based on: The Greene Murder Case; 1928 novel by S.S. Van Dine
- Produced by: William LeBaron; Robert North
- Starring: Grant Richards; Roscoe Karns; Helen Burgess; Ruth Coleman
- Cinematography: Harry Fischbeck
- Edited by: James Smith
- Music by: Boris Morros
- Production company: Paramount Pictures
- Distributed by: Paramount Pictures
- Release date: May 21, 1937
- Running time: 66 minutes
- Country: United States
- Language: English

Night of Mystery is a 1937 American mystery film directed by E.A. Dupont and starring Grant Richards, Roscoe Karns and Helen Burgess. The film was a remake of The Greene Murder Case (1929), adapted from a 1928 novel of the same name. Because of this it is sometimes known by the alternative title The Greene Murder Case.

== Cast ==
- Grant Richards as Philo Vance
- Roscoe Karns as Sgt. Heath
- Helen Burgess as Ada Greene
- Ruth Coleman as Sibella Greene
- Elizabeth Patterson as Mrs. Tobias Greene
- Harvey Stephens as Dr. Von Blon
- June Martel as Barton
- Ellen Drew as Secretary
- Purnell Pratt as John F. X. Markham
- Colin Tapley as Chester Greene
- James Bush as Rex Greene
- Ivan F. Simpson as Sproot
- Greta Meyer as Mrs. Mannheim
- Leonard Carey as Lister
- Nora Cecil as Hemming

== Bibliography ==
- Goble, Alan. The Complete Index to Literary Sources in Film. Walter de Gruyter, 1999.
