= The Right to Be Happy =

1916 film

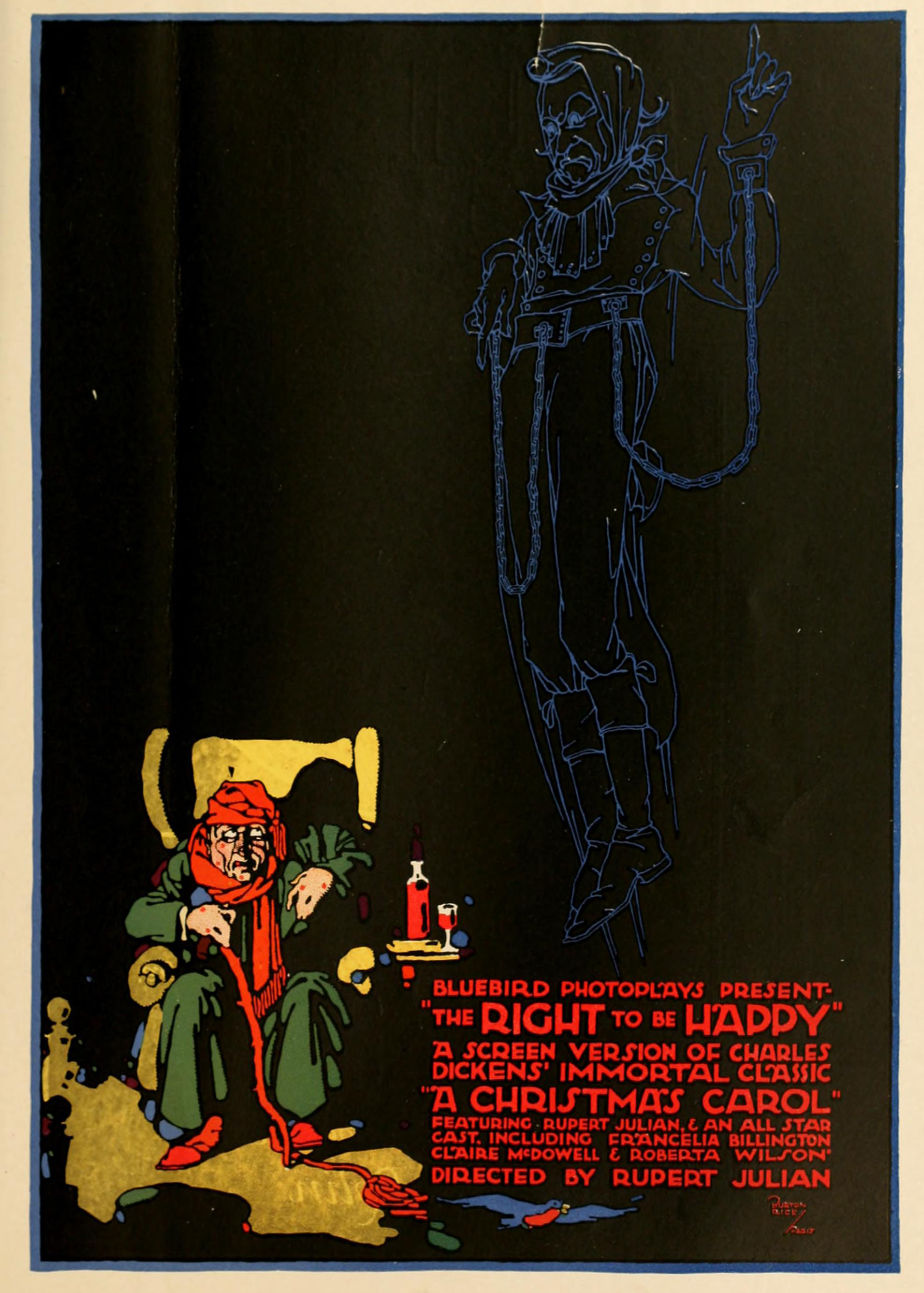
- The Moving Picture World Ad
- Directed by: Rupert Julian
- Screenplay by: Elliott J. Clawson
- Based on: A Christmas Carol by Charles Dickens
- Starring: Rupert Julian; Claire McDowell
- Cinematography: Stephen Rounds
- Production company: Bluebird Photoplays
- Distributed by: Universal
- Release date: December 25, 1916
- Running time: 5 reels (est. 62 minutes)
- Country: United States
- Language: Silent (English intertitles)

The Right to Be Happy is an American silent film from 1916 that draws inspiration from Charles Dickens' 1843 Novella, A Christmas Carol. This film was Universal's first attempt at making a feature film based on Dickens' novella. It was the first and only feature film adaptation of A Christmas Carol by an American or foreign film company during the silent era. The movie was directed by Rupert Julian and supported by a cast of Universal Bluebird players, including Rupert Julian, Claire McDowell, and Harry Carter.

A Christmas Carol narrates the tale of Ebenezer Scrooge, an elderly miser who receives a visit from the ghost of his former business partner, Jacob Marley, and the spirits representing Christmas Past, Present, and Yet to Come. These supernatural visitations prompt a profound transformation within Scrooge, turning him into a more compassionate and benevolent person.

Like many film adaptations, it takes certain artistic liberties with the source material. This film carried Universal"s "Bluebird Photoplay" brand, (Note: In 1916, Universal formed a three-tier branding system for their releases. Universal Films decided to label their movies according to the size of their budget and status. Unlike the top-tier studios, Universal owned no theaters to market its feature films. Universal gave theater owners and audiences a quick reference guide by branding their products. Branding would help theater owners judge films they were about to lease and help fans decide which movies they wanted to see. Bluebird Photoplays Universal released three different types of feature motion pictures: Red Feather Photoplays – low-budget feature films; Bluebird Photoplays – mainstream feature release and more ambitious productions; Jewel – prestige motion pictures featuring high budgets and prominent actors) designating a more mainstream feature and a bigger budget than a Red Feather production. Bluebirds were also known for distinctive artwork, as displayed in this page's Burton Rice movie poster. The movie was produced and distributed by Universal Studios. The film was released on December 25, 1916.

== Plot ==
The story unfolds on Christmas Eve, where we meet Ebenezer Scrooge, an elderly miser and curmudgeon. He lives in a London mansion that once belonged to his former business partner, Jacob Marley. Seven years earlier, Marley passed away on this very night, and Scrooge inherited the house. However, since the day of Marley's burial, Scrooge has not devoted a single moment to thinking about him. Instead, he has commemorated the occasion by continuing his regular business pursuits, showing no regard for his late partner.

Bob Cratchit, his faithful clerk, could go home early this Christmas Eve, but Scrooge declared he must come to work early the next day. Scrooge's nephew, Fred, extended his traditional Christmas Eve call to invite Scrooge for dinner, and Scrooge rejected the offer as usual. Kind-hearted collectors of charities requested donations, and Scrooge turned them away with a contemptuous sneer.

Ending the day, Scrooge retired to his home. He dines alone and then readies himself to spend the night in a dismal and cold room that would make anyone but Scrooge shiver. Scrooge was so penny-pinching that he refused to burn coal or use candles to eliminate the gloom. Although the cold outside was becoming more intense, he could still hear the merry voices of young and old spreading Christmas cheer. Scrooge was annoyed by the cheerful sounds.

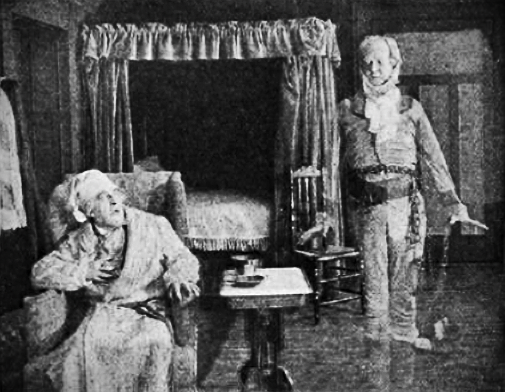
Marley's spirit appears

Scrooge is startled by the sound of footsteps and clanking chains. Suddenly, he sees the spirit of his former business partner, Jacob Marley. Marley scolds Scrooge for his uncompassionate behavior, then informs him that three Christmas spirits (Past, Present, and Yet to Come) will visit him over the following three nights.

Scrooge's first visit is by the Ghost of Christmas Past. The spirit reveals to Scrooge visions of his boyhood and early adulthood days. His employer, Mr. Fezziwig, and his wife are hosting a Christmas party, which he observes. He also reflects on the end of his relationship with his sweetheart. His relentless quest for wealth has steered him toward greed and delusion.

Next to appear is the Ghost of Christmas Present. The spirit reveals the events of Christmas Day. The miser's nephew, Fred, hosts a party where his uncle is the subject of mockery and disdain. Next, the spirit shows Scrooge how the Cratchit household has been faring. Bob Cratchit lives in a humble home with his wife and their son Tiny Tim. Scrooge learns that unless the future changes, the Cratchit's disabled son, Tiny Tim, will die.

The final spirit is The Ghost of the Future. This spirit shows Scrooge scenes of people discussing someone's death. The people in the room do not seem to care about the deceased. Scrooge suddenly realizes that he is the man whose death is celebrated. His demise is cheered by people like Caroline, who have unpaid debts, while others are indifferent. Then, he learns that Tiny Tim has also died. The spirit reveals that if he does not alter his disposition and outlook, he will perish, unloved and unmourned. After seeing these dreadful visions, Scrooge resolves to change his behavior and become a new person. He pleads for an opportunity to rectify his past conduct.

Upon awakening, Scrooge finds himself deeply shaken. To his astonishment, he discovers that all the spiritual visits occurred on Christmas Eve. He then realizes his encounters with the spirits were nothing more than a dream and that today is Christmas Day. The experience has transformed him into a kind-hearted older person, focusing on making up for his past mistakes by helping the less fortunate. Scrooge experiences a joy and fulfillment he had never known through his newfound kindness. As the days pass, the older man, who was defined by greed and coldness, is now a living testament to the power of redemption and the transformative spirit of Christmas.

== Cast ==
Actor	Role
Rupert Julian	Ebenezer Scrooge
Johnnie Cooke	Bob Cratchit
Claire McDowell	Mrs. Cratchit
Frankie Lee	Tiny Tim
Harry Carter	Jacob Marley
Emory Johnson	Fred, Scrooge's Nephew
Francelia Billington	Scrooge's Sweetheart
Lydia Yeamans Titus	Mrs. Fezziwig
Wadsworth Harris	Ghost of Christmas Past
Richard L'Estrange	Ghost of Christmas Present
Tom Figee	The Ghost of the Future
Roberta Wilson	Caroline

== Production ==
=== Pre-production ===
Before the debut of this picture, several short films showcasing A Christmas Carol had already made their way to the silver screen. These films were launched when the technology for feature films was not as advanced. However, these films integrated "Scrooge" or "Christmas Carol" into their titles, rendering them more suitable and tailored explicitly for seasonal viewing. Universal aimed to create a film that captured the essence of Christmas and had a title suitable for year-round viewing. There are five known screen adaptations preceding the release of A Right to be Happy:

- The first known screen adaptation of Dickens's story was the British Short film – "Scrooge, or, Marley's Ghost" directed by Walter R. Booth. The film was 6 minutes and 20 seconds in length and was released in November 1901. The photoplay was produced by Paul's Animatograph Works and became the first worldwide production of A Christmas Carol. The YouTube website also stated "It employed cutting-edge technology for 1901 and was considered lengthy as well, at just over 6 minutes!" It should also be noted this film was one of the first movies to use Intertitles. Only 4 minutes and 55 seconds survive of the original film, and the remnant can be viewed on YouTube "Scrooge, or Marley's Ghost" (1901).
- A second adaptation of the story was the American Short film – A Christmas Carol. This film was 15 minutes in length and was released on December 9, 1908. The photoplay was filmed in Chicago and produced by Essanay Studios. The film is presumed lost.
- The third screen reproduction was an American Short film – A Christmas Carol directed by J. Searle Dawley. The film had a running time of 13 minutes and was released on December 23, 1910. The photoplay was filmed in New York and produced by Edison Manufacturing Company. It is the second oldest surviving screen adaptation of the famous literary work. The short film A Christmas Carol is available for free viewing and download at the Internet Archive..
- A fourth film was another British Short film – Scrooge directed by Leedham Bantock. The 3-reel film was released in September 1913. The Zenith Film Company produced the photoplay. Several Black and white film scenes were color toned. The film was released in the United States as Old Scrooge in 1926 and can be viewed at Old Scrooge on YouTube.
- The final known adaptation preceding A Right to Be Happy was the British Short film – "A Christmas Carol" directed by Harold M. Shaw. The 22-minute film was released on November 10, 1914. The London Film Productions produced the photoplay.

==== Development ====
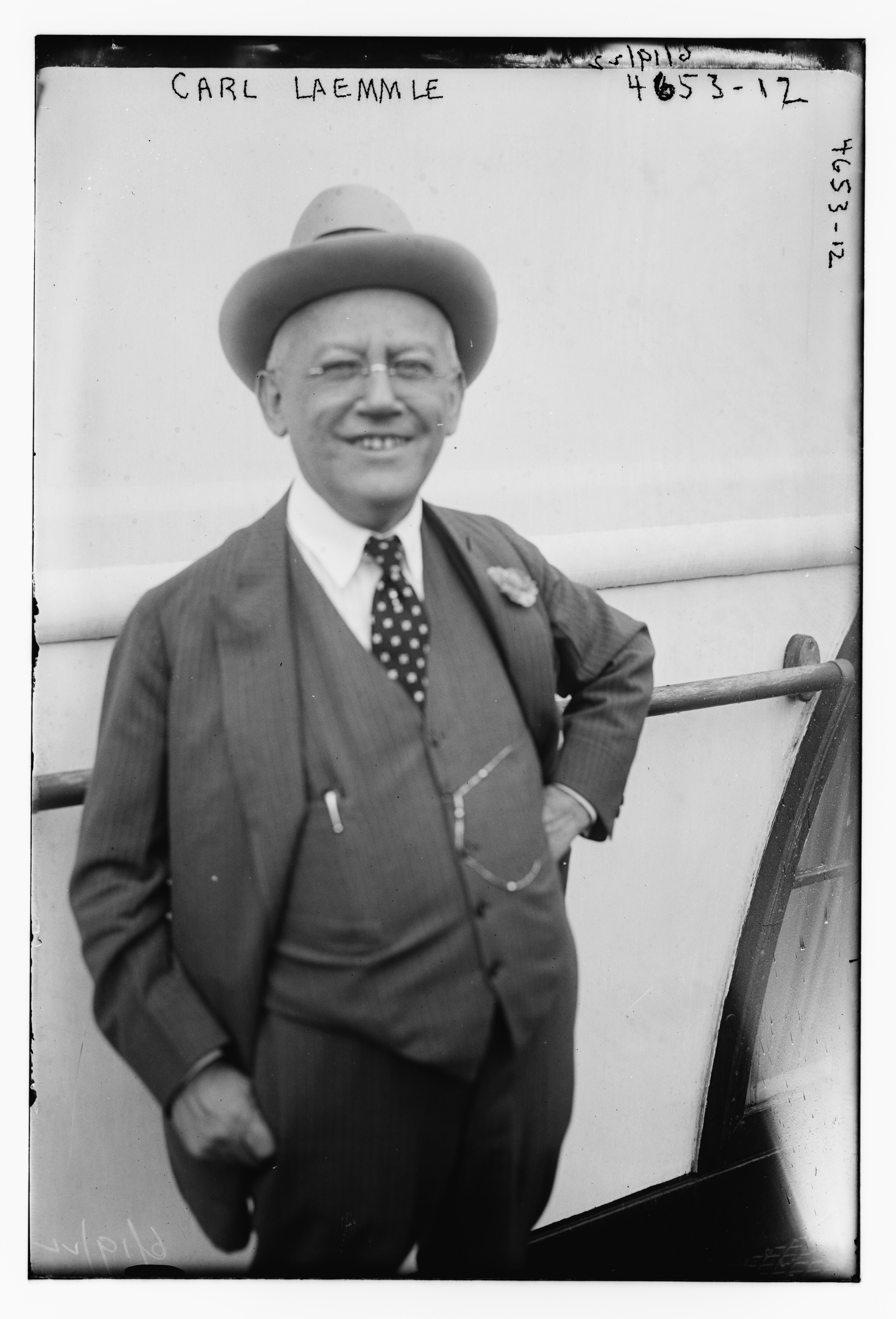
Carl Laemmle in 1918

Authors Charlie Keil and Shelley Stamp observe in the book American Cinema's Transitional Era, Audiences, Institutions, Practices – "The years between 1908 and 1917 witnessed what may have been the most significant transformation in American film history. During this "transitional era", widespread changes affected film form and film genres, filmmaking practices and industry structure, exhibition sites, and audience demographics." One aspect of this transition was the longer duration of films. Feature films (Note: A "feature film" or "feature-length film" is a narrative film (motion picture or "movie") with a running time long enough to be considered the principal or sole presentation in a commercial entertainment program. A film can be distributed as a feature film if it equals or exceeds a specified minimum running time and satisfies other defined criteria. The minimum time depends on the governing agency. The American Film Institute and the British Film Institute require films to have a minimum running time of forty minutes or longer. Other film agencies, e.g.,Screen Actors Guild, require a film's running time to be 60 minutes or greater. Currently, most feature films are between 70 and 210 minutes long.) were slowly becoming the standard fare for Hollywood producers. Before 1913, you could count the yearly features on two hands.

Between 1915 and 1916, the number of feature movies rose Two and one-half times or from 342 films to 835. There was a recurring claim that Carl Laemmle was the longest-running studio chief resisting the production of feature films. Universal was not ready to downsize its short film (Note: " Short Film" - There are no defined parameters for a Short film except for one immutable rule -the film's maximum running time. The Academy of Motion Picture Arts and Sciences defines a short film as "an original motion picture that has a running time of 40 minutes or less, including all credits".) business because short films were cheaper, faster, and more profitable to produce than feature films.

Laemmle would continue to buck this trend while slowly increasing his output of features. In 1914, Laemmle published an essay titled - Doom of long Features Predicted. In 1915, Laemmle ran an advertisement extolling Bluebird films while adding the following vocabulary on the top of the ad. (Note: The moving picture business is here to stay. That you must admit, despite carping critics and blundering sore-heads, true, some exhibitors have found business so good lately — but if you get down to facts when you look for a reason why, it's a 100 to 1 shot that they are, and for some time have been, dallying with a feature program. Some of these wise ones will tell you that business has picked up since they went into features, — BUT — ask them whether they are talking NET or GROSS. They will find they have an immediate appointment and terminate your queries unceremoniously. Funny how we like to kid ourselves, isn't it? The man who is packing 'em in and losing money on features is envied by his competitor, who is laying by a bit every day, and has a good steady, dependable patronage but admits to a few vacant seats at some performances. When this chap wakes up, he will realize that he has a gold mine and that good advertising will make it produce to capacity. The moral is that if you can tie up to the Universal Program, DO IT. If you can't NOW, watch your first chance. Let the people know what you have, and let the feature man go on to ruin if he wants to. You should worry! Motion Picture News - May 6, 1916)

In his book "The Universal Story - The Complete History of the Studio and its 2,641 films," Clive Hirschhorn states Carl Laemmle (c. 1867-1939) produced around ninety-one feature movies in 1916. This total included fifty-four Bluebird films. (Note: What is Universal Branding — Major film studios owned many movie houses. This enabled them to have guaranteed outlets for their products. Since Universal-owned no theaters, they needed a solution advising exhibitors on the type of movie they received. Universal responded by forming a three-tier branding system for their films based on the size of their budget and status. In the book "The Universal Story," Hirschhorn describes the branding as "the low budget, Red Feather programmers, the more ambitious Bluebird releases, and the occasional Prestige or Jewel production." The ticket-buying audience he serviced went to the movies to see their favorite stars, not the vehicle allowing them to perform. The branding system had a brief existence and by 1920 had faded away.)

==== Casting ====
- Rupert Julian (born Thomas Percival Hayes) (1879 – 1943) was 37 years old when he accepted the role as Ebenezer Scrooge.
  Thomas Percival Hayes was born in Whangaroa, New Zealand, in January 1879. He adopted the stage name "Ralph", eventually changing to "Rupert Julian". These name changes avoided confusion with a local personage, Percy Hayes, a convicted felon. Julian was already an experienced stage actor when he migrated from Australia to America in July 1911. After becoming an established stage actor in the New York theater district, he moved to Los Angeles and found work in the burgeoning movie industry.
  Julian had worked in close to 80 movies and directed 28 before accepting the dual role of director and leading role of Ebenezer Scrooge. After completing this film, he continued to find work as an actor, director, writer, and producer. Eventually, he acted in over 90 films, of which he directed 60. Julian's career waned with the advent of Talkies. He retired in 1936 and died in Hollywood at 64 in September 1943.
- Johnnie Cook (born John Joseph Cooke) (October 1, 1874 – October 2, 1921) was an American actor born on October 1, 1874, in Manhattan, New York. Cooke was 42 and a veteran character actor when he was selected for the supporting role of Bob Cratchit. Like most of the actors in this movie, he was a Universal contract player. He acted in over 30 films between 1914 and 1921. He died on October 2, 1921, in Los Angeles, California, at age 47, and was buried in East Los Angeles, California.
- Claire McDowell (born Claire MacDowell) (1877 – 1966) was an American actress. She was 39 years old when this film was released. Her role in this movie was portraying Mrs. Cratchit, the wife of Bob Cratchit. She appeared in 350 films between 1908 and 1945.
- Frankie Lee (1911–1970), was an American child actor of the silent era born on December 31, 1911, in Gunnison, Colorado. Lee was 4 years old when he appeared in this film as Tiny Tim. Lee made his acting debut in the 1916 Universal production of Her Greatest Story directed by Lynn Reynolds. This picture would be his second film. Frankie was also the older brother of Davey Lee, another child actor. Lee would also make an appearance in the 1922 Emory Johnson-directed picture The Third Alarm. Frankie made his last film appearance in the 1925 production of The Golden Strain, which starred Hobart Bosworth and Madge Bellamy. He appeared in 56 films between 1916 and 1925.
- Harry Carter (born Harry Benjamin Carter) (1879 – 1952) was 37 years old when he landed the role of Jacob Marley. Carter was an American actor who appeared in 84 films between 1914 and 1933.
- Emory Johnson (1894 – 1960) was 22 years old when he acted in this movie as Fred, Scrooge's Nephew. In January 1916, Emory signed a contract with Universal Film Manufacturing Company. Carl Laemmle of Universal Film Manufacturing Company thought he saw great potential in Johnson. Laemmle paired Dorothy Davenport with Emory Johnson to create sizzling chemistry on the silver screen. 1916 saw Johnson and Davenport complete 13 films together, ending with The Devil's Bondwoman released in November 1916.
  Johnson would make 17 movies for Universal in 1916, including six shorts and 11 feature-length Dramas. 1916 would become the second-highest movie output of his entire acting career. Emory acted in 25 films for Universal, mostly dramas with a sprinkling of comedies and westerns.
- Francelia Billington (1895 – 1934) was 21 years old when she acted in this movie playing Scrooge's Sweetheart. She was an American silent-screen actress and an accomplished camera operator. She acted in 140 films between 1912 and 1930.
- Lydia Yeamans Titus (born Lydia Annie Yeamans) (1857 – 1929) was 59 years old when she acted in this movie as Mr. Fezziwig. She was an Australian–born American singer, dancer, comedienne, and actress. She appeared in at least 142 motion pictures between 1911 and 1930.
- Wadsworth Harris (1864 – 1942) was 52 years old when he acted in this movie portraying the Ghost of Christmas Past. He acted in 46 films between 1911 and 1936.
- Richard L'Estrange (born Gunther Van Strensch) (1889 – 1963) was 26 years old when he acted in this movie as the Ghost of Christmas Present. He acted in 27 movies between 1913 and 1929. They also show L'Estrange served in the movie industry as an actor, assistant director, casting director, cinematographer, director, producer, and production manager.
- Tom Figee (1881 – 1941) was 35 years old when he acted in this movie playing the Ghost of Christmas Yet to Come. This film was the only feature film he acted in. He also acted in one short film in 1922.

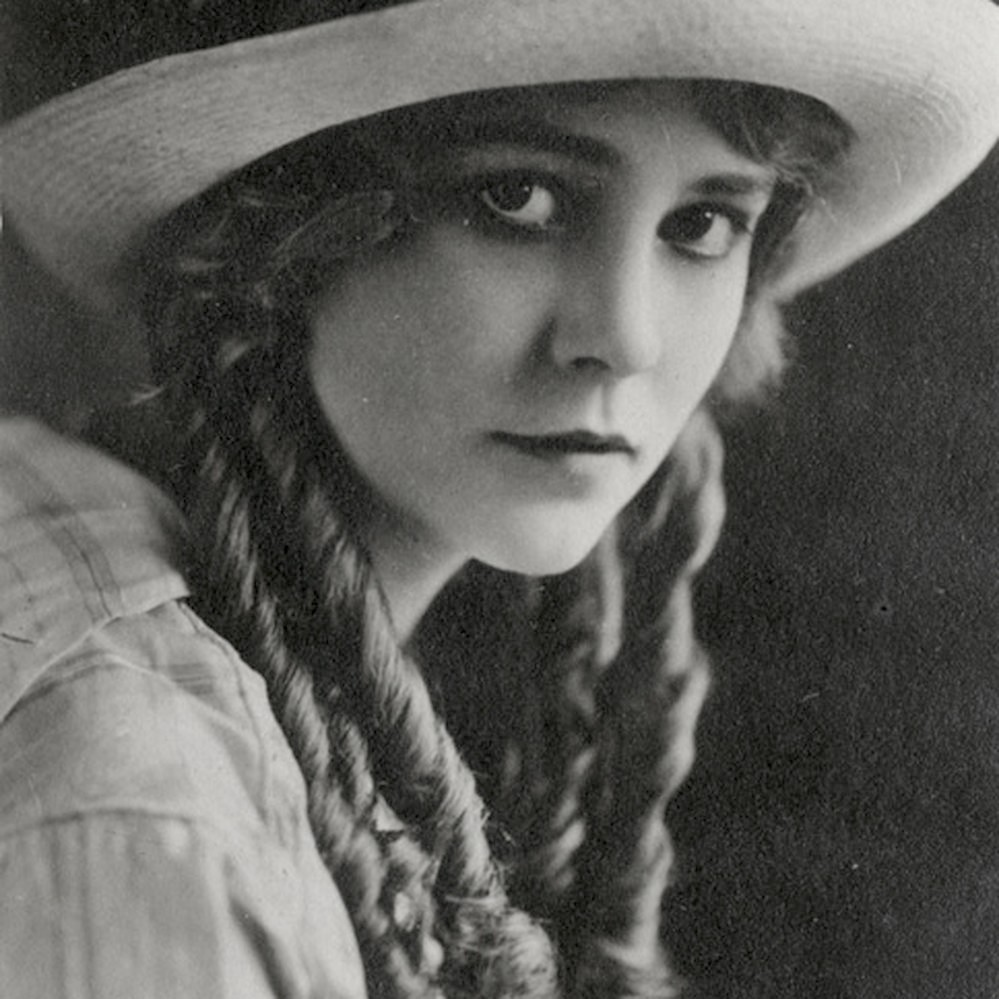
Brownie Vernon

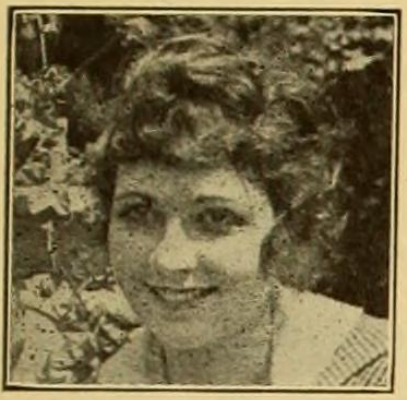
Roberta Wilson

- Roberta Wilson (1897 – 1977 ) was an American actress born on January 15, 1896, in Pittsburgh, Pennsylvania. She was 20 years old when she played the part of Caroline. When she was young, her parents moved the family to Alabama. She was also the younger sister of the more famous Lois Wilson. Both girls were known as the Alabama beauties. Wilson started working for Universal in November 1915. Like most aspiring actors, she earned her acting chops in minor uncredited roles. Wilson appeared in her first Universal movie with an onscreen credit - The Other Half on April 25, 1916. After her introduction as a female lead in The Other Half, she had gone from uncredited to shared top billing in a matter of months. Roberta Wilson's first feature-length film was the Universal Red Feather production of The Isle of Life released on October 30, 1916. Wilson's second feature-length film was the Universal Red Feather production of The Heritage of Hate released on November 13, 1916. This movie would mark her promotion to do Bluebird films. 1916 would mark the highest yearly film output of her entire acting career. Wilson would receive onscreen credit for 12 movies consisting of 3 features and 9 short films.

Roberta Wilson was not the first choice for the role of Caroline. Agnes (Brownie) Vernon (1895–1948) was an American actress of the silent era born on December 27, 1895, in San Diego, California. She was chosen to play the character of Caroline in this movie when she was just 20. During the production of this movie, she was under an exclusive contract with Universal and a valued member of the Bluebird stable of actors. With her established name, prior acting experience, and a history of collaboration with Rupert Julian, Vernon appeared to be an ideal fit for the role. Universal had grand plans for this film, aiming to make it a standout attraction for the Christmas season. Caroline's scenes were slated to be filmed towards the end of the production. This project marked Vernon's second planned feature film and her final slated appearance for 1916.

The movie's promotional materials and articles widely advertised that Francelia Billington and Agnes Vernon were the lead actresses. Trade magazines consistently listed Vernon as playing Caroline until approximately Christmas 1916. In December, Vernon was involved in a car accident and sustained injuries. While no known news items directly attributed her replacement to the accident, the timing was highly coincidental. An article in Billboard on December 2 mentioned that Universal had postponed the film's release from December 18 to December 25. The studio desired one of their beauties to portray the character of Caroline, which ultimately led to the selection of southern belle Roberta Wilson for the role.

==== Director ====
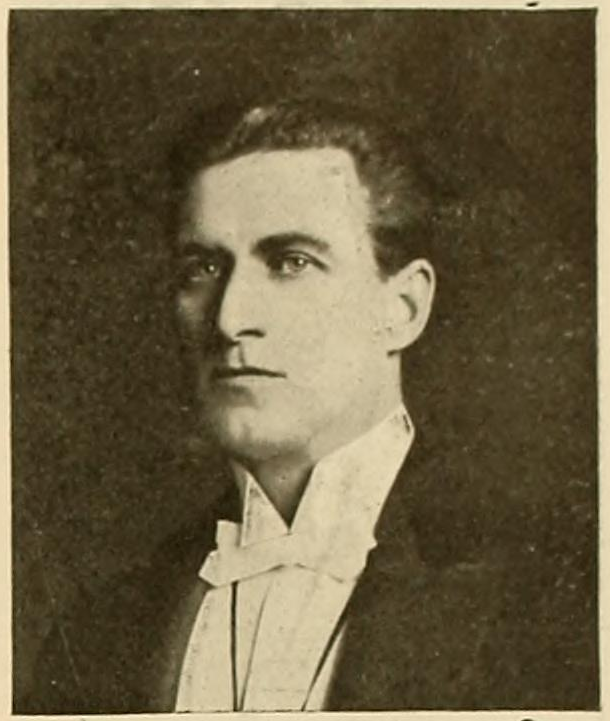
Rupert Julian

Rupert Julian (born Thomas Percival Hayes) (1879 – 1943) was 37 years old when he undertook the dual roles of director and actor in this film. When he migrated from Australia to New York City in 1911, he was already in his thirties and an established stage and screen actor. After establishing himself as a stage actor in New York, he moved West to Los Angeles in 1913.

Julian embarked on his cinematic journey by acting in his first recorded short film, His Sister released by Universal on February 9, 1913. He would finish the year by acting in fourteen more short films. The following year, 1914, he worked in another twenty-five films. His first recorded directing experience was in August 1914, when he directed the short film The Midnight Visitor. In 1915 he acted in nineteen pictures and directed six short films. In 1916 he performed in twenty-three films. This year would mark the first time he directed a feature film, a Bluebird Photoplay titled Naked Hearts released by Universal on May 10, 1916. He would also direct three more Bluebird feature films before being given the reins of The Right to be Happy. With a substantial body of work already under his belt, Rupert Julian had acted in an impressive total of eighty movies and directed twenty-eight before undertaking the dual responsibilities of a director and the leading role of Ebenezer Scrooge. He remained active in the industry and directed his final film in 1930.

==== Themes ====
A Christmas Carol was introduced as a Christmas-themed story during its initial publication. The story's events unfold on Christmas Eve and Christmas Day, embodying the true spirit of generosity and compassion associated with Christmas. Yet, a profound moral lesson lies beneath the surface of this seemingly straightforward yuletide narrative. The story revolves around the transformation of its main character, Scrooge. Dickens introduced Scrooge by having him appear as "a two-dimensional figure, a cold-hearted, selfish old man isolated from everyone around him. All of these details of Scrooge's past rescue him from being merely the stage villain of the opening pages and show him to possess an emotional depth, a regret for lost opportunities." At its core, "A Christmas Carol" is a Christian morality tale serving as a reminder that even the most hardened hearts can be softened and redeemed to embrace compassion and find redemption.

"There will be an all-year interest in "The Right to be Happy," as the lesson of benevolence "A Christmas Carol" presents has no particular season".

— 1916 Moving Picture World Article,

Universal placed the primary focus of its film on Scrooge's transformation. By doing so, the film aimed to become a year-round morality play, where the central theme revolved around Scrooge's profound change, with Christmas serving as an incidental backdrop. In her book "Charles Dickens: A Life" Claire Tomalin argues that Scrooge's conversion carries a powerful Christian message: " . . . even the worst of sinners may repent and become good men.". By using this concept of Redemption, or the act of being saved from sin or evil, emerges as a paramount theme throughout the movie, appealing to audiences all year round.

Universal was concerned that keeping the story's original title, A Christmas Carol, would link the film to the Christmas season, potentially impacting its bookings all year round. Having recognized that a crucial aspect of the moral message conveyed the idea of individual control over one's destiny, they named the film A Right to be Happy. The film also explored Scrooge's backstory.

==== Screenplay ====
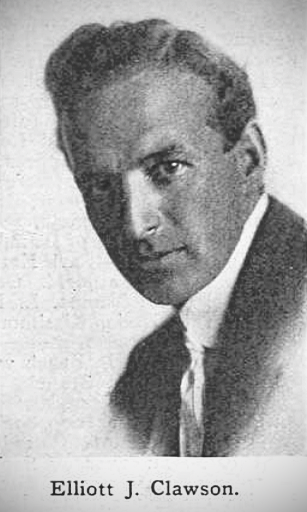
Elliott J. Clawson

Elliot Judd Clawson (a.k.a. E.J. Clawson, Elliot Clawson) (1883–1942) was an accomplished screenwriter who authored the scenario "A Right to be Happy" at the age of 33. The prolific screenwriter wrote scripts for seventy-nine films between 1913 and 1929. Forty-nine of these scripts were produced under the banner of Universal Pictures.

Clawson was born in Salt Lake City, Utah, on January 18, 1883. He began his professional career as a newspaper reporter in San Francisco. However, in 1910, Clawson's path took a new turn as he ventured into the realm of cinema in 1910. This marked his debut as a scenario writer, setting the stage for a prolific career. It was in this new artistic landscape that Clawson found his true calling.

His first foray into screenwriting came with the short film "Shadows of Life," released in October 1913 by the Rex Motion Picture Company. He wrote his first feature-length scenario for "The Truth Wagon," released in December 1914 by Masterpiece Film Manufacturing Company. He became a well-known writer for the Morosco Photoplay Company and Masterpiece Films until he was signed to a contract by Universal in March 1916.

Clawson landed his first writing assignment for Universal, crafting the scenario for the short film "The Fur-Trimmed Coat," released in May 1916. The film paired Clawson with Rupert Julian, marking the beginning of a fruitful partnership with the multi-talented Rupert Julian, who directed and starred in the movie. Clawson created fifteen scenarios in 1916, of which eight were for Rupert Julian's projects. Their creative synergy would culminate in The Right to be Happy, released in December 1916.

As Clawson's collaboration with Julian extended over the years, their partnership blossomed further. Clawson's involvement in scenario writing extended to twenty-four out of the sixty films that Julian directed between 1916 and 1925. Their exceptional journey together culminated in the production of the iconic film The Phantom of the Opera released in September 1925.

In 1930, Clawson achieved a notable milestone in his career when he received Academy Award nominations for Best Writing (Adapted Screenplay) in not just one but four different films. The advent of Talkies caused the careers of Julian and Clawson to languish and then fade into obscurity. Elliott Clawson died in Vista, California, on July 24, 1942

=== Filming ===
On March 15, 1915, Carl Laemmle officially opened the world's largest motion picture production facility, Universal City Studios, on a 230-acre converted farm.

This picture was filmed entirely at the Universal Studios studio complex located at 100 Universal City Plaza in Universal City, California as reported in The Los Angeles Evening Citizen – "Rupert Julian is directing and playing 'Scrooge" in Charles Dickens' "A Christmas Carol" which is being produced in five reels at Universal City." Universal produced and distributed this film.

==== Schedule ====
◆ The Movie Schedule is pieced together from multiple sources ◆
Year	Month	Day	Event	Ref
1916	Nov	3	Rupert Julian is directing and playing Scrooge . . . which is being produced in 5 reels at Universal City. . . Notable cast including Claire McDowell, Agnes Vernon . . "	
1916	Nov	19	Director Rupert Julian at Universal City is making progress filming Charles Dickens's famous story "A Christmas Carol."	
1916	Nov	25	Dickens' "Christmas Carol" is being produced at Universally City under the direction of Rupert Julian, including Agnes Vernon	
1916	Dec	2	"A Christmas Carol" . . . "The release will be made on December 18 with Mr. Julian, Francelia Billington, and Agnes Vernon featured"	
1916	Dec	9	The first mention of the film's title - "The Right to Be Happy" in a publication published by Universal.	
1916	Dec	21	Critic's review of "The Right to Be Happy," published on Dec 21, 1916, first mentions Roberta Wilson in the cast	
1916	Dec	23	"Several changes deemed advisable . . Rupert Julian's screen version of the Dickens classic "A Christmas Carol was originally set for Dec 18, but it will now be shown Dec 25 as a feature of exact timeliness. "The Right to be Happy" will be used as the title and Mr. Julian with Francelia Billington, Agnes Vernon . . "	
1916	Dec	23	"Production of 5-reel comedy-drama "Face Value" featuring Agnes Vernon has been delayed because of an accident which befell Miss Vernon. She was thrown from the automobile . . ."	
1917	Jan	1	"For several days, Agnes Vernon, known as "Brownie" at Universal City, and who portrays one of the leading roles in Director Wm. Worthington's company was confined to her home following injuries she received when thrown from an automobile."	

==== Working Title ====
During the production phase, films need a reference name to identify the project, often called an Alternate or Working title. Often, the working title becomes the official release title of the film.

According to the British Film Institute website, Universal considered titling the movie, Scrooge the Skinflint. In his book, "The Universal Silents: A Filmography of the Universal Motion Picture Manufacturing Company, 1912-1929," Richard Braff supplements his entry for A Right to be Happy with the additional notation - also known as "Marley Ghost."

The most significant alteration involved switching the movie title from the novella's original name, A Christmas Carol to The Right To Be Happy. In the December 2, 1916, issue of Motion Picture News, the article refers to the film as a version of – "A Christmas Carol." In the December 9, 1916 issue of The Moving Picture World, the item cites the film's final release title as – "The Right to Be Happy"

=== Post production ===
The theatrical release of this film totaled five reels or 5,000 feet of film. As is often the case, the listed time for this feature-length movie varies. The average time per 1,000-foot 35mm reel varied between ten and fifteen minutes per reel at the time. Thus, the total time for this movie is computed between fifty and seventy-five minutes.

==== Music ====
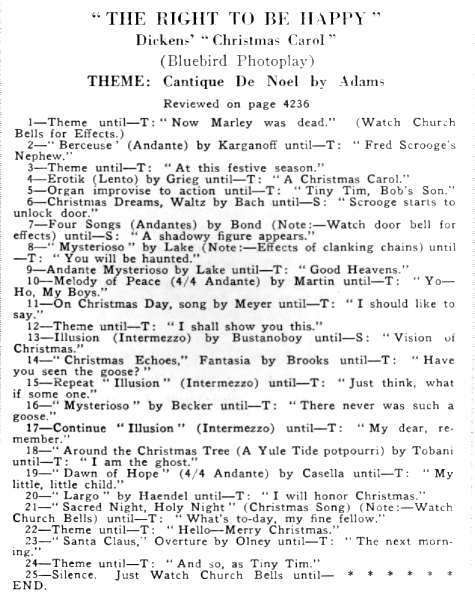
The Right to be Happy Motion Picture News cue sheet Listen to sample cue sheet music: 1. Cantique De Noel on YouTube; 2. Berceuse on YouTube

One noteworthy aspect of Bluebird Films was their practice of crafting unique musical scores specifically for each of their productions and then submitting these scores to the Library of Congress. As a result, numerous film scores from Bluebird productions can be found in the LOC collections.

One example of this convention was the musical score submitted to the Library of Congress for the 1916 Bluebird production of The Crippled Hand. The LOC is titled - Musical setting to the Bluebird photoplay no. 15 : Robert Leonard and Ella Hall in "The crippled hand". The item also shows original scores by – Winkler, Max, 1888-1965, composer and Rehsen, F. (Frank), 1877-1948, composer. Regrettably, there are no surviving musical scores from this film in the LOC archives.

In the "Accessory News Section" of the Motion Picture News dated January 6, 1917, the introduction to the "Music and the Picture" component reads:

"Suitable and effective musical accompaniments are of prime necessity and to every moving picture production. In view of this important necessity, Motion Picture News has now completed special arrangements to provide all subscribers with complete musical cue sheets free of charge. . . The music page published in the News is a great aid to orchestra leaders, and all the theatre manager has to do is hand it to his musicians."

The following shows some of the early lines of the Motion Picture News musical Cue Sheet for The Right to Be Happy:

"THE RIGHT TO BE HAPPY"
Dickens' "Christmas Carol"
(Bluebird Photoplay)
THEME: Cantique De Noel by Adams
1 – Theme until T : "Now Marley was dead." (Watch Church Bells for Effects.)
2 – "Berceuse" (Andante) by Karganoff until T: "Fred Scrooge's Nephew."
3 – Theme until T: "At this festive season."

== Release and reception ==
When this film was released, there were no extravagant premieres in New York or Los Angeles, no theater searchlights, and no star-studded cast members in attendance. Instead, it had a modest release on a Monday, similar to other branded Universal films.

=== Official release ===
On December 15, 1916, The Right to be Happy was copyrighted to Universal with a registration number of LP9742. (Note: The copyright was filed with U.S. Copyright Office and entered into the record as shown: THE RIGHT TO BE HAPPY. 1916. 5 Reels. Adapted from the story "A Christmas Carol" by Charles Dickens. Credits: Director, Rupert Julian; scenario, E. J. Clawson. © Bluebird Photoplays; 15 Dec 16; LP9742.)

In the December 2, 1916 issue of the Motion Picture News, the article stated:

BLUEBIRD has done its Christmas shopping, and its token to the exhibitor will be a screen version of the famous Dickens classic, " A Christmas Carol," which E. J. Clawson has adapted to the screen and Rupert Julian has directed. The release will be made December 18 with Mr. Julian, Francelia Billington and Agnes Vernon featured.

In the December 9, 1916 issue of the Moving Picture World, we see first time the new title is applied:

"The Right to Be Happy" Is the title that has been dellnltely applied to the Dec. 18 Bluebird, based on Charles Dickens* Immortal classic, "A Christmas Carol." This release will be particularly timely, as opposition to Christmas shopping and be right in the subject as well.

The December 16, 1916 issue of the Moving Picture World, states:

The Right to Be Happy was delayed by a week (from December 18), and in its place was run the Bluebird production of The Honor of Mary Blake.

The December 23, 1916 issue of the Moving Picture World, states:

Rupert Julian's screen version of the Dickens classic, "A Christmas Carol," was originally set for Dec. 18, but it will now be shown Dec. 25, as a feature of exact timeliness. "The Right to be Happy" will be used as the title for "A Christmas Carol" and . . .

=== Advertising ===
DO YOU WANT TO KNOW
HOW I LOST THE RIGHT
TO BE HAPPY?
Visit the (your Theatre) To-day! — (1) Placard on sign pole

You are cordially invited to attend

the reception to be given in
honor of the following world-famous personages:
Old Scrooge
Tiny Tim
Bob Cratchit
and the only universally - loved,
sure enough, graveyard inhabitant Marley's Ghost
on (day and date here)

at (name here) THEATRE — (2) Mailing Invitation

Advertising is essential for the success of a movie because it helps attract paying customers to the theater, resulting in higher box office revenues. A successful marketing campaign increases the hype by informing potential stakeholders about plotlines, actors, release dates, and other important information. Armed with this knowledge, a theater owner was better prepared to make a booking decision in a competitive market.

Universal's trade journal, The Moving Picture Weekly usually published marketing tips for films in a section named "Putting It Over." However, in the Christmas issue of December 16, 1916, the magazine published advertising insights for this picture as part of its comprehensive coverage of this film. Among the included recommendations were:

- "Marley's ghost plays a most important part in this film. Hire a man to play the part of the ghost. Dress him up in a white sheet. Have him paint his face a dead white and shade it to give it a skull-like effect at a little distance. Chains should be twisted about his body, and a short length should trail along the ground from each foot. Have him carry a pole sign on which the following copy is painted" – see quote box 1
- "Since this production urges us to give our fellowmen the benefit of love and charity, make every effort to get in touch with the charitable organizations in your community."
- "Get in touch with the heads of the local schools. Dickens is one of the favorite authors in our educational institutions, and from an educational standpoint, "The Right To Be Happy" will be regarded as a perfect picture by school teachers".
- "Have the following copy printed on an invitation card in the regulation invitation form. Enclose it in an envelope and send it to the people on your mailing list" – see quote box 2.

An article published in Wid's Films and Film Folk dated December 21, 1916, suggested: " the name of Dickens should help to bring in the patronage, particularly if you will handle this as a special proposition, making a direct appeal to the schools, the literary societies and the women's clubs"

=== Reviews ===
Movie reviews played a vital role for both theater owners and fans, offering crucial perspectives. The opinions shared in reviews, which were published in different trade magazines, were indispensable in the process of deciding whether to book a movie for screening or to watch it as a viewer. When critics expressed conflicting viewpoints about a film, making a choice became more challenging. Divergent reviews did not always imply that the movie was inherently bad. In the end, the choice relied on personal preferences and the weight one gave to the movie review and its author.

==== Critical Response ====
- In the December 25, 1916 issue of the "Chicago Tribune," the movie was reviewed by Mae Tinee. She observed:
  A Christmas, Carol Dickens, the immortal story of the world's greatest Grouch, has been beautifully picturized, and if you have a chance this Christmas week and would like to really get into the good old fashion spirit of Yuletide, try and locate and see the right to be happy. (I think it's a pity though they changed the name.)
  This feature has been carefully and intelligently produced. The quaint characters and settings have been copied, almost in detail from the descriptions in the book. Rupert Julian's Ebeneezer Scrooge is a classic. John Cook, as Bob Cratchit, is as real as can be, and how you're going to love Tiny Tim.
- In the December 30, 1916 issue of the "Moving Picture World," the reviewer Margaret MacDonald stated:
  "The five-part screen version of that delightful Dickens' classic. "A Christmas Carol" is destined to give pleasure to many Christmas audiences. The production has a genuine spirit of Dickens, and the characters are well portrayed. Sometimes in ensemble scenes, we are conscious, for instance, of the spirit of the boisterous American girl, rather than the subdued and dignified feminine of the England of Dickens' day,' but dealing with generalities, we are pleased. While this production may not compare altogether favorably with some Dickens' productions we have seen that have been made on English soil, still, there is little fault to be found with. Still will minored with it and children will be delighted with this adaptation of the story of the regeneration of an old grouch."
- In the December 30, 1916 issue of the Motion Picture News, movie critic Steve Talbot points out:
  "A Pretentious adaptation of Charles Dickens's classic of the holiday spirit, known everywhere as "A Christmas Carol." The only criticism that could be leveled at the production is that the players seemed too cold by far. They fairly reveled in mufflers and topcoats, while the California sunshine bathed everything in its rays. Much fine photography and an air of Christmas homeliness pervade the whole production. Some years ago the Edison Company cleaned up on their version of this story, in one reel, as a Christmas special release. It is highly probable that Bluebird will do the same this year with this five-reeler."

==== Audience response ====
Prior to leasing a film, picture house owners had a significant concern: ensuring that the film had the potential to be a profitable venture in their specific location. To aid them in making informed financial decisions, these proprietors would subscribe to trade journals. These publications provided valuable assistance by featuring critical reviews, attendance, revenue, and opinions from other managers. By reading these assessments, picture house owners could determine the viability of a film deciding whether it was likely to attract audiences and generate the desired financial returns in their locale.

- Dale Loomis Manager Peru, Indiana population 12,000
  . . the Public High School of this city have chosen your feature picture, "The Right to be Happy," which we play on next Friday, as the best subject to be obtained for a benefit performance for the school. This is certainly a boost for the Bluebird pictures, as this choice was made after looking over twelve different makes of pictures.
- Chas E. Cobbey, Pastor First Christian Church Omaha, Nebraska population 191,000
  We ran your photoplay, "The Right to Be Happy," last Friday night, and I am writing to let you know that we considered it one of the finest that we have ever had. Old and young enjoyed it equally. The acting was of the best. We are very grateful to you for the film because I have had to turn down film after film that I did not think was the proper thing to show; but certainly, no one could object to anything in "The Right To Be Happy." It is delicate and could be shown with profit and benefit in any church in the country.
- M.J.Weil Lake Shore Theater Chicago, Illinois population 2,500,000
  A very good picture which was well-liked. Good box office attraction - Very High-Class Patronage.

== Preservation status ==
Many silent-era films did not survive for various reasons, as explained on this Wikipedia page. (Note: Film is history. With every foot of film lost, we lose a link to our culture, the world around us, each other, and ourselves. – Martin Scorsese, filmmaker, director NFPF Board A report by Library of Congress film historian and archivist David Pierce estimates that: around 75% of original silent-era films have perished; 14% of the 10,919 silent films released by major studios exist in their original 35 mm or other formats; 11% survive only in full-length foreign versions or film formats of lesser image quality.)

According to the Library of Congress website, this film has a status of - No holdings located in archives; thus, it is presumed all copies of this film are lost.

== Gallery ==
The Players and Director
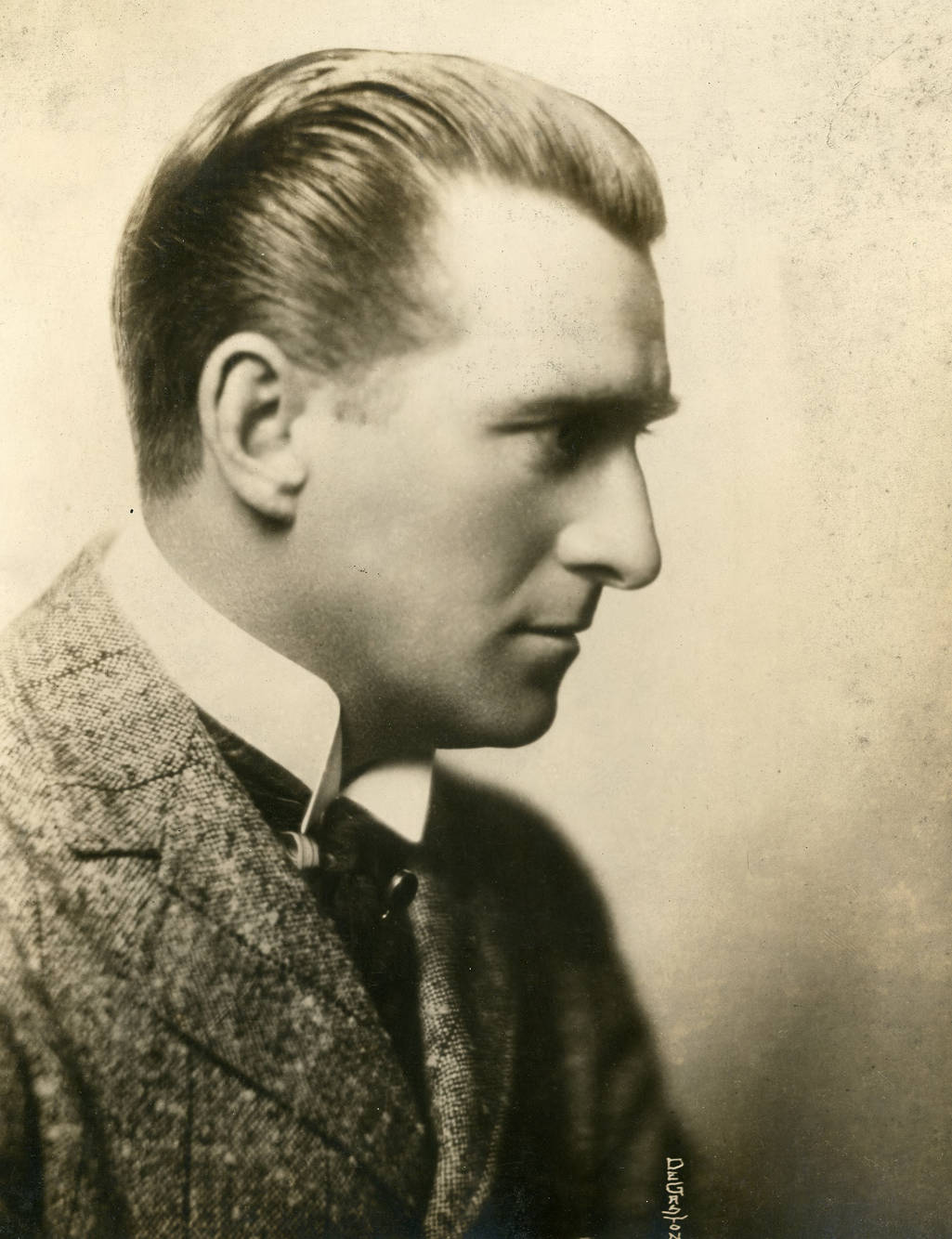
Rupert Julian in 1923
Ebenezer Scrooge & Director

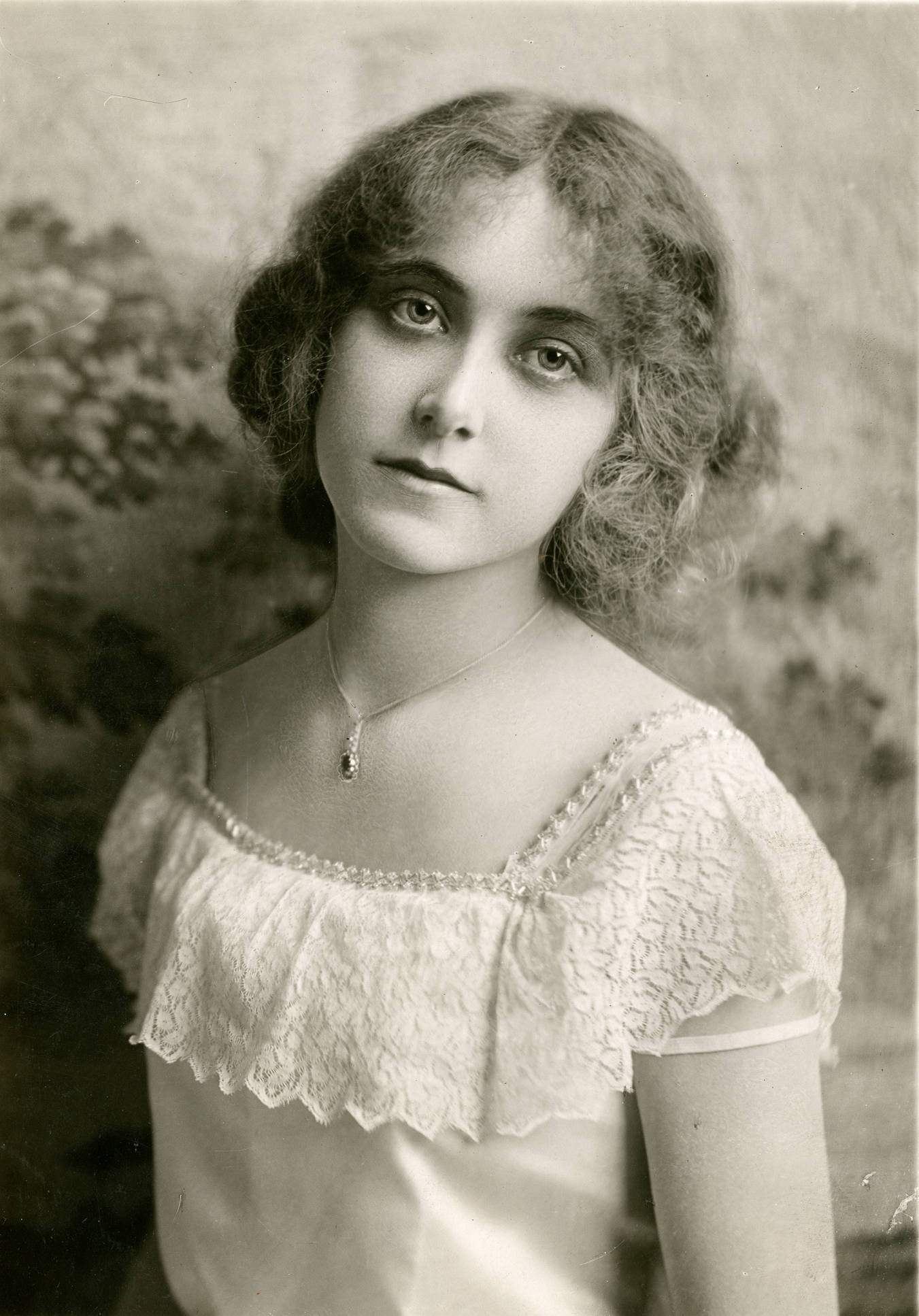
Francelia Billington in 1914
Scrooge's Sweetheart

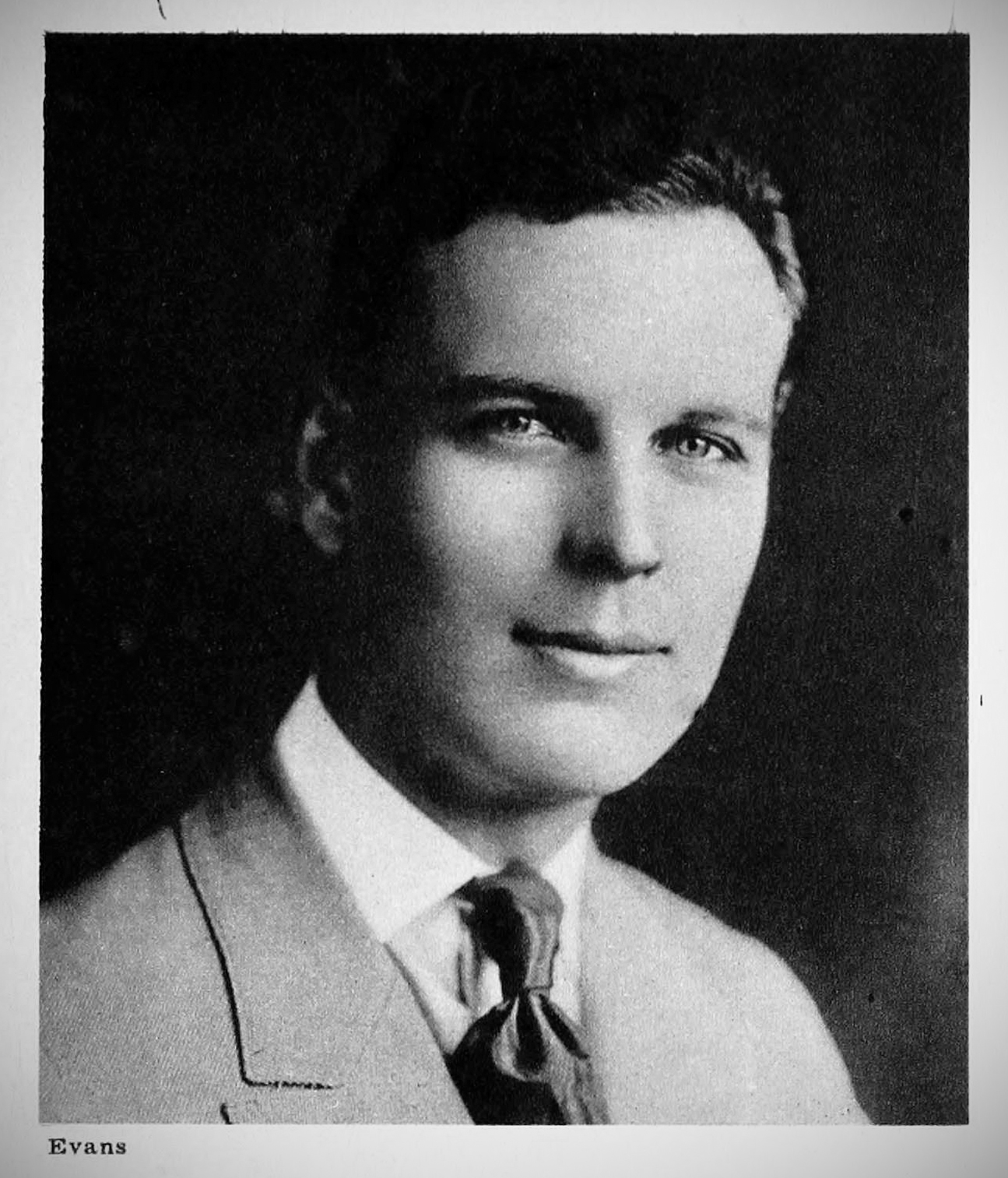
Emory Johnson in 1916 (AI-upscaled image)
Fred, Scrooge's Nephew

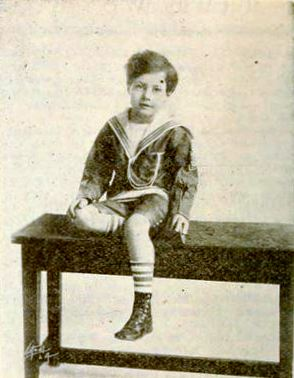
Frankie Lee in 1919
Tiny Tim

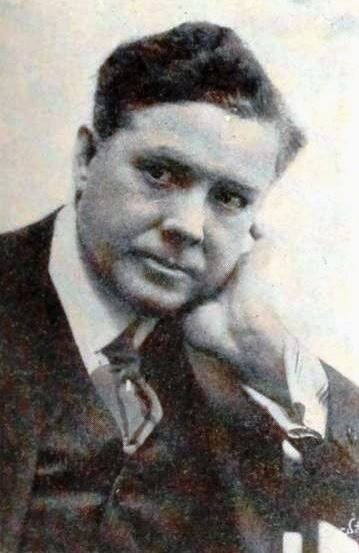
Harry Carter in 1920
Jacob Marley

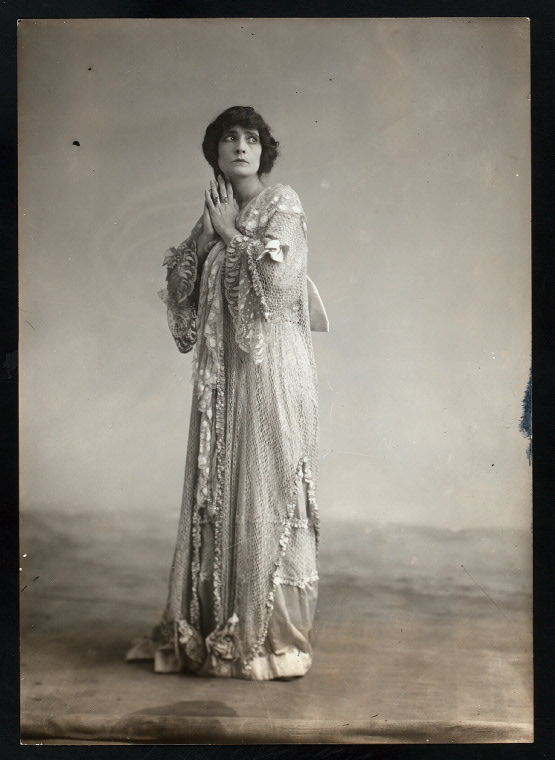
Claire McDowell in 1922
Mrs. Cratchit

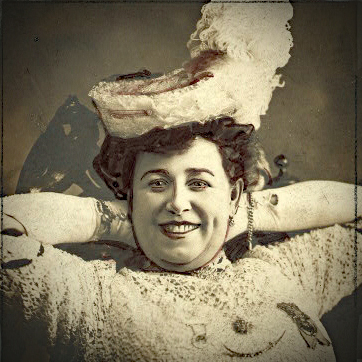
Lydia Yeamans Titus
Mrs. Fezziwig

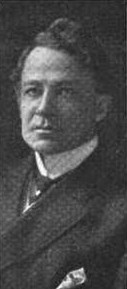
Wadsworth Harris in 1904
Ghost of Christmas Past

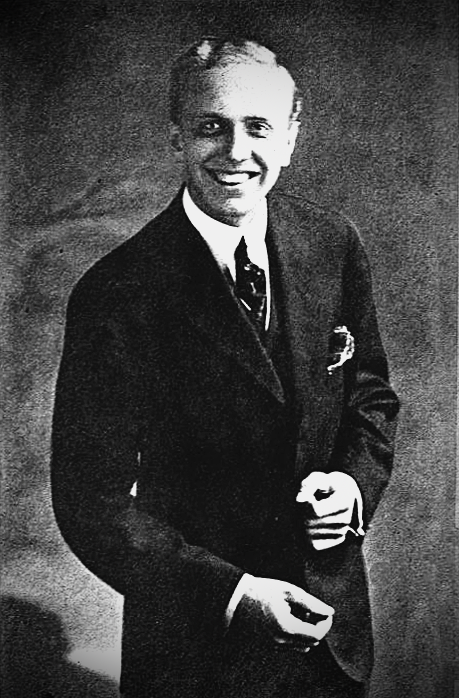
Richard L'Estrange in 1914
Ghost of Christmas Present

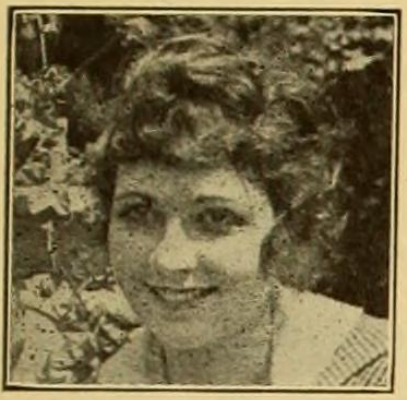
Roberta Wilson
Caroline

== See also ==
- List of Christmas films
- Adaptations of A Christmas Carol

== Bibliography ==
- Braff, Richard E. (1999). The Universal Silents: A Filmography of the Universal Motion Picture Manufacturing Company, 1912-1929. McFarland. ISBN 978-0-7864-0287-8.
- Cooper, M.G. (2010). Universal Women: Filmmaking and Institutional Change in Early Hollywood. Women's Media History Now!. University of Illinois Press. ISBN 978-0-252-09087-5.
- Elliot, Kamilla (2003). Dickens on Screen. Cambridge University Press. p. 117. ISBN 978-0521001243.
- Garry, Jane; El Shamy, Hasan (2005). Archetypes and Motifs in Folklore and Literature. Armonk, NY: M.E. Sharpe. ISBN 978-0-7656-2953-1.
- Hirschhorn, Clive (1983). The Universal Story - The Complete History of the Studio and its 2,641 films. New York: Crown Publishing Group. ISBN 0-517-55001-6.
- Kawin, Bruce F. (1987). How Movies Work. University of California Press. p. 46. ISBN 9780520076969.
- Keil, C.; Stamp, S. (2004). American Cinema's Transitional Era: Audiences, Institutions, Practices. ACLS Humanities E-Book. University of California Press. ISBN 978-0-520-24027-8.
- Katchmer, George A. (2002). A Biographical Dictionary of Silent Film Western Actors and Actresses. Jefferson, North Carolina: McFarland & Company, Inc. ISBN 978-0-7864-4693-3.
- Kelly, Richard Michael (2003). "Introduction". In Dickens, Charles (ed.). A Christmas Carol. Ontario: Broadway Press. pp. 9–30. ISBN 978-1-55111-476-7.
- Slide, Anthony (2000). Nitrate Won't Wait: History of Film Preservation in the United States. McFarland. p. 5. ISBN 978-0786408368. "It is often claimed that 75 percent of all American silent films are gone, and 50 percent of all films made prior to 1950 are lost, but such figures, as archivists admit in private, were thought up on the spur of the moment, without statistical information to back them up."
- Smith, M.G.; Selzer, A. (2015). Flickering Empire: How Chicago Invented the U.S. Film Industry. Columbia University Press. p. 90. ISBN 978-0-231-85079-7.
- Thompson, F. (1998). Great Christmas Movies. G - Reference, Information and Interdisciplinary Subjects Series. Taylor Publishing. ISBN 978-0-87833-214-4.
- Tomalin, Claire (2011). Charles Dickens: A Life. London: Penguin Books. ISBN 978-0-670-91767-9.
- Zmuda, Michael (2015). The Five Sedgwicks: Pioneer Entertainers of Vaudeville, Film and Television. Manhattan, New York City: McFarland. p. 30. ISBN 978-0-7864-9668-6.
