= Homeric simile =

Comparison in the form of a lengthy simile

Iliad, Book 22

Fear fell upon Hektor as he beheld him, and he dared not stay longer where he was but fled in dismay from before the gates, while Achilles darted after him at his utmost speed. As a mountain falcon, swiftest of all birds, swoops down upon some cowering dove—the dove flies before him but the falcon with a shrill scream follows close after, resolved to have her—even so did Achilles make straight for Hektor with all his might, while Hektor fled under the Trojan wall as fast as his limbs could take him.

Homeric simile, also called an epic simile, is a detailed comparison in the form of a simile that is many lines in length. The word "Homeric", is based on the Greek author, Homer, who composed the two famous Greek epics, the Iliad and the Odyssey. Many authors continue to use this type of simile in their writings although it is usually found in classics.

The typical Homeric simile makes a comparison to some kind of event, in the form "like a ____ when it ______." The object of the comparison is usually something strange or unfamiliar to something ordinary and familiar. The Iliad, for instance, contains many such similes comparing fighting warriors to lions attacking wild boars or other prey. These similes serve to take the reader away from the battlefield for a brief while, into the world of pre-war peace and plenty. Often, they occur at a moment of high action or emotion, especially during a battle. In the words of Peter Jones, Homeric similes "are miraculous, redirecting the reader's attention in the most unexpected ways and suffusing the poem with vividness, pathos and humour". They are also important, as it is through these similes that the narrator directly talks to the audience.

Some, such as G.P. Shipp, have argued that Homer's similes appear to be irregular in relation to the text, as if they were added later. On the other hand, William Clyde Scott, in his book The Oral Nature of the Homeric Simile, suggests that Homer's similes are original based on the similarities of the similes and their surrounding narrative text. Scott argues that Homer primarily uses similes to introduce his characters, "sometimes to glorify them and sometimes merely to call attention to them." He uses Agamemnon as an example, noting that each time he reenters the battle he is described with a simile. However, he also points out that Homer's similes serve as a poetic device in order to foreshadow and keep the reader interested – just as the fateful, climactic confrontation of Achilles and Hector.

In her article On Homer's Similes, Eleanor Rambo agrees with Scott that the similes are intentional, also noting that Homer's use of similes deepen the reader's understanding of the individual or action taking place through a word-picture association that the reader is able to relate to. She states that "the point of the simile is the verb which makes the common ground for the nouns involved." According to Rambo, Homer uses similes in two different ways: those that stress physical motion and those that stress emotional disturbance.

== See also ==
- Epithets in Homer
