= Madame Spy (1918 film) =

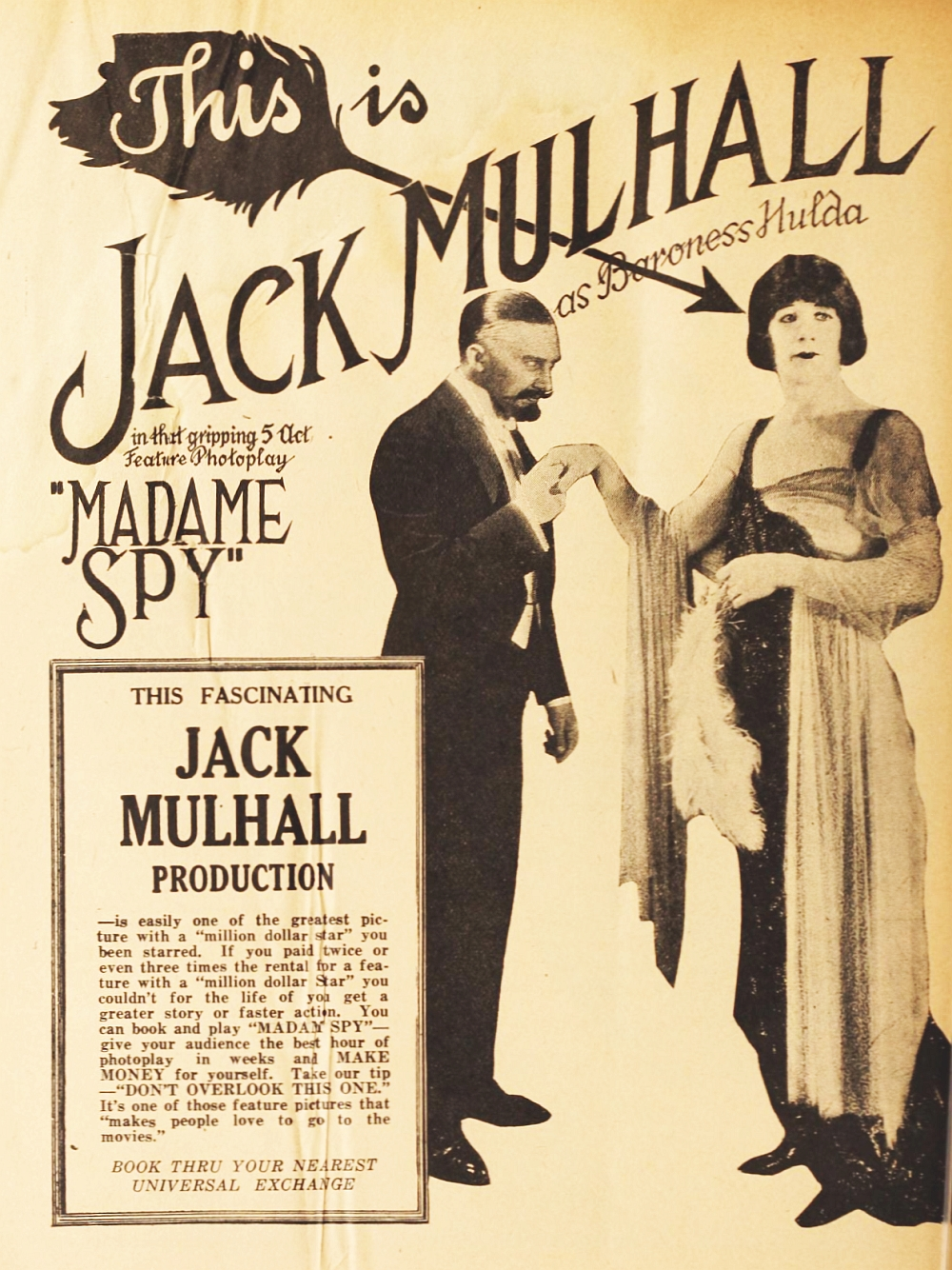
- Directed by: Douglas Gerrard
- Written by: Harvey Gates; Lee Morrison
- Produced by: Jack Mulhall
- Starring: Jack Mulhall; Claire Du Brey; Wadsworth Harris
- Cinematography: Jack MacKenzie
- Production company: Universal Pictures
- Distributed by: Universal Pictures
- Release date: January 21, 1918
- Running time: 50 minutes
- Country: United States
- Languages: Silent; English intertitles

Madame Spy is a 1918 American silent comedy spy film directed by Douglas Gerrard and starring Jack Mulhall, Claire Du Brey and Wadsworth Harris.

== Cast ==
- Jack Mulhall as Robert Wesley
- Donna Drew as Phyllis Covington
- Wadsworth Harris as Adm. John Wesley
- George Gebhardt as Hanson
- Jean Hersholt as Count Von Ornstorff
- Claire Du Brey as Baroness Von Hulda
- Maude Emory as Margaret Wesley

== Bibliography ==
- James Robert Parish & Michael R. Pitts. The Great Spy Pictures. Scarecrow Press, 1974.
