= The Plainsman =

1936 film

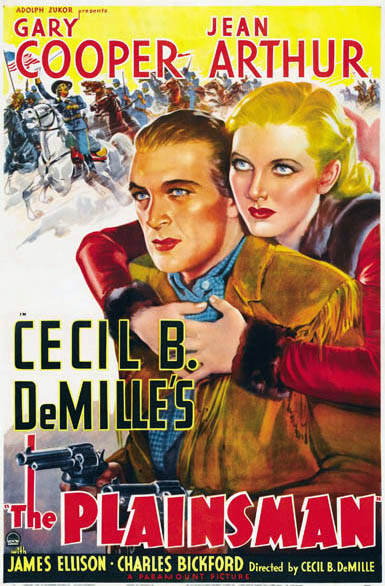
- Theatrical release poster
- Directed by: Cecil B. DeMille
- Screenplay by: Waldemar Young; Harold Lamb; Lynn Riggs
- Story by: Courtney Ryley Cooper
- Based on: "Wild Bill Hickok, the Prince of Pistoleers"; 1934 stories by Frank J. Wilstach
- Produced by: Cecil B. DeMille
- Starring: Gary Cooper; Jean Arthur; James Ellison; Charles Bickford
- Cinematography: Victor Milner
- Edited by: Anne Bauchens
- Music by: George Antheil
- Distributed by: Paramount Pictures
- Release date: November 16, 1936
- Running time: 113 minutes
- Country: United States
- Language: English
- Budget: $974,084
- Box office: $2,278,533

The Plainsman is a 1936 American Western film directed by Cecil B. DeMille and starring Gary Cooper and Jean Arthur. The film presents a highly fictionalized account of the adventures and relationships between Wild Bill Hickok, Calamity Jane, Buffalo Bill Cody, and General George Custer, with a gun-runner named Lattimer (Charles Bickford) as the main villain. The film is notorious for mixing timelines and even has an opening scene with Abraham Lincoln setting the stage for Hickok's adventures. Anthony Quinn has an early acting role as an Indian. A remake using the same title was released in 1966.

== Plot ==
With the end of the American Civil War, military industrialists are left with an oversupply of weapons. Some of the more unscrupulous ones view the Indians as possible new customers.

Wild Bill Hickok has just been discharged from the Union Army and is making his way back west. On a paddle steamer, he bumps into his old army scout colleague, Buffalo Bill Cody and his new bride. Later, their mutual friend Calamity Jane is the driver of their stagecoach to Hays City, Kansas.

John Lattimer, an agent for unscrupulous gun makers, has supplied the Cheyenne with repeating rifles, which enable them to kill half of the troopers at a United States Cavalry outpost. Hickok discovers the rifles and reports it to General George Armstrong Custer. Custer sends out an ammunition train to the fort with Cody as guide. Hickok tries to locate Yellow Hand, the leader of the Cheyenne, to find out why the Indians have gone to war.

When Calamity is captured by the Indians, Hickok tries to bargain for her release, but is taken to Yellow Hand (as he had hoped). Yellow Hand states that the Indians are fighting because the white man has started settling land promised to the Indian and is killing off the buffalo. Yellow Hand promises to release his captives if they tell him the route of the ammunition train. After much prodding from Calamity, Hickok professes his love for her just before he is about to be burned alive. Calamity then discloses the route in order to save Hickok. Yellow Hand holds true to his word by releasing his two prisoners.

The Indians ambush the ammunition train. Hickok sends Jane to get help while he fights alongside the besieged soldiers. After a desperate six-day siege on a river bank, the survivors are saved when Custer arrives with the cavalry.

Back in town, Hickok catches up with Lattimer and tells him to get ready for a gun duel. Lattimer sends three cavalry deserters in his place. Hickok kills all three in the gunfight, but this makes him a fugitive from the law. Hickok flees to the Dakota Territory. Calamity leaves for Deadwood separately when the townspeople find out what she had done.

Custer sends Cody after Hickok. After meeting in the woods, the two friends capture an Indian and learn that Custer has been killed at the Battle of the Little Bighorn and that the Cheyenne are moving to join the Sioux in the Black Hills. They also learn that Lattimer is sending more rifles to the Indians, to be picked up in Deadwood. Instead of arresting his friend, Cody rides off to warn the cavalry, while Hickok goes to Deadwood to deal with Lattimer. Hickok kills Lattimer and detains Lattimer's henchmen for arrest by the cavalry, but is shot in the back by Lattimer's informant, Jack McCall, while he is playing poker with the henchmen to pass the time. A heart-broken Calamity Jane cradles Hickok's body.

== Cast ==
- Gary Cooper as Wild Bill Hickok
- Jean Arthur as Calamity Jane
- James Ellison as William "Buffalo Bill" Cody
- Charles Bickford as John Lattimer
- Helen Burgess as Louisa Cody
- Porter Hall as Jack McCall
- Paul Harvey as Yellow Hand
- Victor Varconi as Painted Horse
- John Miljan as General George A. Custer
- Frank McGlynn, Sr. as Abraham Lincoln
- Granville Bates as Van Ellyn
- Frank Albertson as Young trooper
- Purnell Pratt as Captain Wood
- Fred Kohler as Jake (teamster)
- Pat Moriarity as Sergeant McGinnis
- Charles Judels as Tony
- Harry Woods as Quartermaster Sergeant
- Anthony Quinn as A Cheyenne Indian
- Francis McDonald as A River Gambler
- George Ernest as A Boy
- George MacQuarrie as General Merritt
- George "Gabby" Hayes as Breezy (billed as George Hayes)
- Fuzzy Knight as Dave

Cavalry soldier extras and unit horses were period costumed members of the 115th Cavalry, Wyoming National guard which was still a horse cavalry unit from 1922 to 1941.

== Production ==
Parts of the film were shot in Kanab Canyon, Kanab movie fort, and Paria, Utah.

== Release ==
The film was initially banned in Nazi Germany, but Paramount requested the ban to be lifted in October 1937, and the censorship office lifted the ban in March 1940.

On 16 December 1944, at 15:20, a German V-2 rocket directly landed on the roof of the Cinema Rex in Antwerp, Belgium during a showing of The Plainsman. 567 people were killed making it the largest loss of life by a single rocket attack during World War II

== Reception and accolades ==
Writing for The Spectator in 1937, Graham Greene gave the film a rave review, suggesting that "perhaps it is the finest Western in the history of film". Greene praises de Mille's direction for his "magnificent handling of the extras in the big sets" as well "the firm handling of the individual drama". He also describes his pleasure in the acting of Cooper and Bickford as well as the "unexpected trace of sophistication" in Antheil's soundtrack for the film.

It was nominated for the American Film Institute's 2008 AFI's 10 Top 10 in the Western film category.

== See also ==
- List of films and television shows about the American Civil War

== Works cited ==
- Niven, Bill (2018). Hitler and Film: The Führer's Hidden Passion. Yale University Press. ISBN 9780300200362.
