= Lawrence Gilman =

American music critic (1878–1939)

Lawrence Gilman (July 5, 1878 – September 8, 1939) was an American author and music critic.

Lawrence Gilman was the son of Arthur Coit Gilman and Bessie (Lawrence) Gilman, and the grandnephew of educator Daniel Coit Gilman. Lawrence Gilman studied art at Collins Street Classical School in Hartford, Connecticut under William M. Chase. He also taught himself music in theory and practice on several instruments, including organ and piano.

From 1896 to 1898, he worked for the New York Herald, then from 1901 to 1913 as a music critic for Harper's Weekly, where he advanced to the position of managing editor. From 1915 to 1923, he worked as a critic in multiple arts for the North American Review, and for the Herald Tribune from 1923 until his death.

On August 1, 1904, he married Elizabeth Wright Walter, with whom he had one child, "Betty" Elizabeth Lawrence Gilman in 1905.

Gilman earned later notoriety for his scathing negative reviews of compositions that later became known as classics. He described George Gershwin's Rhapsody in Blue, for example, as trite, feeble, conventional, vapid, fussy, futile, lifeless, stale, derivative and inexpressive. He was similarly dismissive of Gershwin's later Porgy and Bess.

== Works ==
Gilman wrote several books:

- "Phases of Modern Music" (1904)
- "The Music of Tomorrow" (1906)
- "Stories of Symphonic Music" (1907)
- "A Guide to Strauss' 'Salome'" (1907)
- "A Guide to Debussy's 'Pelleas et Melisande" (1907)
- "Edward MacDowell: A Study" (1909)
- "Aspects of Modern Opera" (1908)
- "Nature in Music" (1914)
- "A Christmas Meditation" (1916)
- "Music and the Cultivated Man" (1929)
- "Wagner's Operas" (1937)
- "Toscanini and Great Music" (1938)
- "Orchestral Music" (1951)

He also wrote musical works:

- "A Dream of Death" (1903)
- "The Heart of a Woman" (1903)
- "The Curlew" (1904).
