= Frank J. Wilstach =

American newspaper editor and writer (1865–1933)

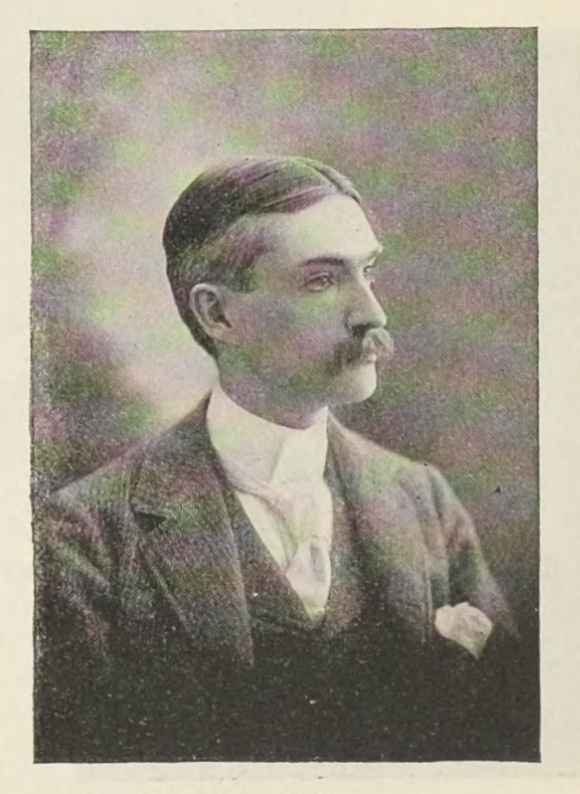
Frank Wilstach in 1898

Frank J. Wilstach (October 20, 1865 – November 28, 1933) was an American newspaper editor, talent agent for actors and theater and motion picture organizations, an author and a lexicographer. He was best known for compiling the Dictionary of Similes, published in 1916, which was followed by a new edition in 1924 and an annual list of the best similes of the year.

== Early life ==
Frank Jenners Wilstach was born in Lafayette, Indiana, the third of four sons of John Augustine Wilstach and the former Elizabeth Pattee. His father, born in Washington, D.C., was a lawyer and a classical scholar and translator who published English translations of the complete works of Virgil and of Dante's Divine Comedy. John Wilstach also served as Indiana's commissioner of immigration and was sent by Governor Oliver P. Morton to the Exposition Universelle in Paris in 1867 to encourage European emigration to the state. Two of Frank Wilstach's brothers, Claxton and Paul, also became prominent writers and theatrical managers.

Wilstach took courses at the University Academy at Purdue University, a prep school for students who were too young for the university or did not wish to complete a full set of courses, between 1879 and 1882. He also reportedly studied at Seton Hall College from 1882 to 1884. He did not earn a degree from either institution.

== Career ==
=== Newspaper editor and business manager ===
In 1886, Wilstach (as editor) and his brother Claxton (as business manager) published a short-lived weekly newspaper, the Jackson Sunday Times, in Jackson, Michigan. It was welcomed by an established Jackson paper as "filled with bright and well written local and society gossip, in conjunction with matter of interest to Sunday readers." (That same paper, after the demise of the brothers' publication, described it as "a sort of semi-society organ, and as Jackson does not happen to be that sort of town it was not what might be termed a glittering success.") The brothers were sued by a local businessman for libel and briefly jailed, though it is unclear what was the eventual outcome of the suit.

In the late 1880s and early 1890s, Wilstach worked as a business manager for the Sioux City Tribune in Iowa and the Oakland Tribune in California. His newspaper experience was said to be a factor in his later success as a press agent.

=== Theatrical Agent ===
Wilstach did some early work as an advance agent for circuses and Wild West shows, including the Sells Brothers Circus. He also wrote promotional copy for the Starr Opera Company led by George O. Starr, who had been an advertising agent for the Barnum & Bailey Circus and would later take over leadership of that circus after the death of James Bailey. In 1895, Wilstach worked as a promoter for F. F. Proctor's 23rd Street Theater in New York where, according to a 1905 article, he "began to show the ability which later characterized his efforts." He did other work as an agent for the vaudeville comedy duo of Joe Weber and Lew Fields and for the Broadway Theatre.

In early 1897, while working for the Broadway Theatre, Wilstach began preparing for the opening of the DeWolf Hopper Company comic opera El Capitan on February 22. After the end of that show's run at the Broadway, Wilstach became the agent for Hopper's company, promoting its performances around the country. His press work on behalf of the company was praised by several newspapers, including one that noted "That a good press agent, who can write bright stories, and whose judgment is sound, is a good thing, is evinced by the unusual number of cleverly written articles appearing in the western and California papers about De Wolf Hopper and his company."

Wilstach prepared a 16-page promotional booklet for the Hopper company's 1898 production of The Charlatan, with music composed by John Philip Sousa and played by Sousa and his band. The booklet was praised by the magazine The Opera Glass which noted "it is handsomely illustrated and contains among other things an amusing article on 'When Hopper comes to town.'" That "amusing article," filled with hyperbolic descriptions of the effect the company has on every town it visits, was reprinted in newspapers. The Washington Times, citing it as an example of the kind of rapturous press release that usually goes into the wastebasket, said "Even the wildest enthusiast could hardly have used the story seriously, but the author's stock of adjectives seemed too good to waste on the desert air...."; the paper ran the piece in full.

In 1899, Wilstach accompanied Hopper and his company to London. British papers, both before and after the trip, portrayed him as an example of the American model of theatrical agent. The newspaper The Era, in a 1900 interview, described him as someone whose "connection with the press, of course, gives him a capital knowledge of what is required of a theatrical press agent who is quite an institution on the other side, where every theater has a writer more or less attached to the staff, who writes up the shows and invents or discovers all kinds of incidents connected with the plays and the players for advertising purposes."

Wilstach took on other actors as well, including Viola Allen, Francis Wilson, William Faversham, Edward Sothern, Julia Marlowe, and Leslie Carter. Some of these were arranged under the auspices of Liebler & Co., a theatrical production company that also had a press agent operation. Wilstach also worked as press agent for the Shubert brothers and their string of theaters and for producer and theater owner Sam H. Harris (partner and brother-in-law of George M. Cohan.) He was an active member of the Friars Club, which began as the Press Agents' Association, and served as its vice president in its early years.

=== Writing ===
Throughout his time as a theatrical agent—and both before and after—Wilstach was also busy as a writer, with articles in newspapers and magazines on the theater, on books, on language, and on other topics. (He even wrote an article on "Better Cows as a Solution of the Milk Problem".)

From 1905 to 1907, he wrote a column called "Micro-Drama-Graphs" for the trade magazine The Billboard (now Billboard) that was also widely syndicated in newspapers. Each column was a collection of one-liners most of which contained puns or other wordplay. Many were theater-related. For example: "It is curious how a modest actress will appear in a threadbare play"; "The actor who keeps his eyes steadily fixed on the three stars on a brandy bottle is finally convinced that he is one of them"; "A good many of our song writers have plenty of gas but no meter".

Wilstach wrote columns on a variety of topics for the New York Times Magazine and the "Amusements" section of the Times between 1917 and 1930. In September 1925 he wrote a long profile of Wild Bill Hickok. A year later, his 304-page biography Wild Bill Hickok was published by Doubleday to favorable reviews in the Times, and elsewhere. The book served as a major source for the 1936 movie The Plainsman, starring Gary Cooper as Hickok.

==== A Dictionary of Similes ====
In 1916, Little, Brown and Company in Boston published Wilstach's A Dictionary of Similes, a compilation he had been working on for more than 20 years. It included more than 15,000 examples from more than 800 authors, indexing them under more than 3,000 topics and, where possible, identifying their first use.

Following the publication of the enlarged 1924 edition, Wilstach continued to collect new similes, producing an annual selection of the best similes of the year that appeared in the Times and other papers. Several of his columns in the Times Magazine focused on similes and slang in specific fields, particularly theater and film.

=== Hays Organization ===
In 1927, Wilstach joined the Motion Picture Producers and Distributors of America (MPPDA), commonly called the Hays Organization, as assistant to Will H. Hayes with special responsibility for press relations. He was described in one trade publication as "the buffer-state between the Hays organization and the press." He would remain in that position until his death in 1933.

== Personal life and death ==
Wilstach married Edith Hudnall in San Francisco on July 11, 1889. They had one son, John H. Wilstach (1890–1960), who was a theatrical agent, a novelist, and a magazine writer.

Frank Wilstach died on November 28, 1933, at the age of 68. His death was noted in the New York Times and other newspapers, including papers in Sioux City and Oakland where he had worked early in his career. Walter Winchell published a tribute to Wilstach sent to him by the writer Jim Tully who praised Wilstach for his work on similes and also as "the world's greatest book collector." His death was also noted in trade journals, including a lengthy obituary in Motion Picture Herald which, while also noting his work on similes, described Wilstach's long career this way:

Few men have had a wider acquaintance among authors, actors and producers in the entertainment business. He had an encyclopedic knowledge of the theatre, and many notable figures of the American stage were helped in their rise to fame by the exploitation campaigns conducted by him.
