= Khayyam (disambiguation) =

Omar Khayyam (1048-1131) was a Persian poet, mathematician, philosopher and astronomer.

Khayyam may also refer to:

== Places ==
- Khayyam, Nishapur, a village and site of the 2004 Nishapur train disaster
- Khayyam, Kermanshah, a former village, now borough of the city of Kermanshah
- Khayam Metro Station, a station on the Tehran Metro Line at Khayam Street
- Khayyam Expressway, an expressway in Esfahan
- Omar Khayyam Square, a city square in Nishapur

== People with the surname ==
- Mohammed Zahur Khayyam (1927–2019), commonly credited as 'Khayyam', Indian music composer
- Amina Khayyam (born 1980), British dancer
- Omar Khayam (protester) (born 1983), British protester who dressed as a suicide bomber

== People with the given name ==
- Khayyam Mirzazade (born 1935), Azerbaijani composer and professor

== See also ==
- Khayyam triangle
- Khayyam quadrilateral
- Kerry Wendell Thornley (1938–1998), co-founder of Discordianism, who wrote as Omar Khayyam Ravenhurst
- Omar Khayyam (disambiguation)
