= Omar Khayyam (disambiguation) =

Omar Khayyam (1048–1131) was a Persian poet, mathematician, philosopher and astronomer.

Omar Khayyam may also refer to:

== Film ==
- Omar Khayyam (1923 film), an American silent film
- Omar Khaiyyam, a 1946 Bollywood film
- Omar Khayyam (1957 film), an American historical adventure film
- The Omar Khayyam Show, Spike Milligan's 1963 remake of his series The Idiot Weekly

== Places ==
- Omar Khayyam (crater), a lunar crater
- Omar Khayyam Square, a city square in Nishapur, Iran

== Other uses ==
- Rubaiyat of Omar Khayyam, a poem by Edward FitzGerald
- Omar Khayyam (horse) (1914–1938), a British-born Thoroughbred racehorse
- Omar Khayam (protester) (born 1983), British protester who dressed as a suicide bomber
- Omar Khayyám, a 1906 choral work by Sir Granville Bantock
- Omar Khyam, British Islamist militant, caught during Operation Crevice in 2004

== See also ==
- Omar Kiam, nickname of American fashion designer Alexander Kiam (1894-1954)
- Kerry Wendell Thornley (1938–1998), co-founder of Discordianism, who wrote as Omar Khayyam Ravenhurst
