= Irish Hearts =

Irish Hearts may refer to:

- Irish Hearts (1927 film), an American comedy film
- Irish Hearts (1934 film), a British drama film
