= Highbinders =

"Highbinder" commonly refers to a "hit man" in a Chinese-American criminal gang.

Highbinders may refer to two films:

- The Highbinders, a 1915 American short crime film
- The Medallion (working title: Highbinders), a 2003 Gordon Chan action-comedy film starring Jackie Chan
