= Mississippi Suite =

1926 orchestral suite in four movements by Ferde Grofé

"Mississippi Suite, A Tone Journey Part 1 "Huckleberry Finn" "Old Creole Days""
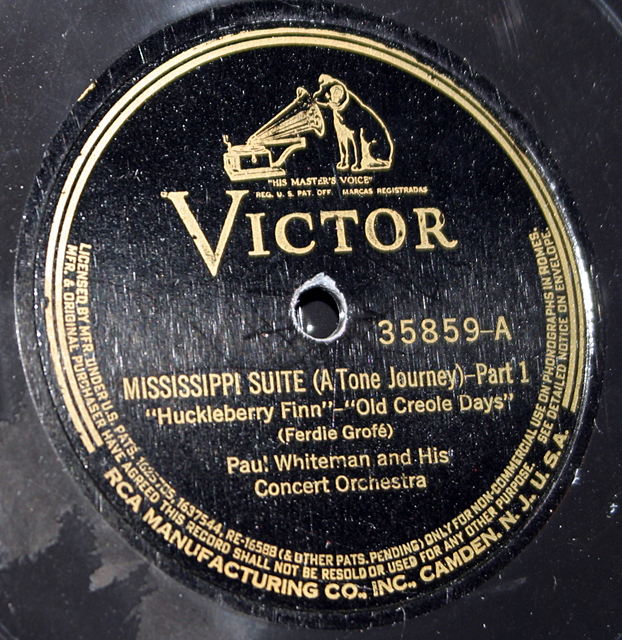
- 1928 Victor Records release

Single by Paul Whiteman and His Concert Orchestra
- B-side: Mississippi Suite, A Tone Journey Part 2 "Mardi Gras"
- Written: 1926
- Published: April 20, 1926 Leo Feist, Inc.
- Released: January 1928
- Recorded: September 7, 1927
- Studio: Trinity Church Studio, Camden, New Jersey
- Genre: Orchestral jazz
- Length: 3.48, 3.40
- Label: Victor 35859 12" 78rpm
- Composers: , arrangement, orchestration by Ferdie Grofé

Mississippi; Tone Journey is a 1926 orchestral suite in four movements by Ferde Grofé, depicting scenes along a journey down the Mississippi River from its headwaters of Minnesota to New Orleans.

== History ==
The work was composed by Grofé in 1926 and first performed that year by Paul Whiteman's Orchestra in New York City. Publisher Leo Feist, Inc., New York copyrighted the composition on April 20 as "Mississippi; Tone Journey" and described it as "1. Father of waters. [3 others]". The composer is "Ferdie Grofe". These are the legal names of the composer and his work, though, in later years, it became known as the "Mississippi Suite".

=== Daybreak ===
Later, American lyricist Harold Adamson wrote words to the music from the ballad theme of the suite's final movement. The resulting song was called "Daybreak". In July 1942, it was recorded and released by Harry James, Jimmy Dorsey, and Tommy Dorsey, with their Orchestras and Vocalists. All reached the top 20 of the National Best-Selling charts, with Tommy Dorsey and his vocalist, Frank Sinatra, peaking at number 10 in October. Sinatra recorded it again, along with many of his 1940s hits, on May 2, 1961, for the Reprise album, "I Remember Tommy". Sy Oliver arranged and conducted the Orchestra at United Recorders, Los Angeles.

== Movements ==
The four movements are:

1. Father of the Waters – depicts the birth of the Mississippi River in the streams of Minnesota and the lands of the Chippewa Indians
2. Huckleberry Finn – based on the novel The Adventures of Huckleberry Finn by Mark Twain. A short piece ruminating on Huck's prankish nature
3. Old Creole Days – Grofe's interpretation of spirituals sung by slaves on the plantations
4. Mardi Gras – depicts Fat Tuesday in New Orleans

The entire piece runs about 17 minutes.

== Instrumentation ==
The piece is scored for piccolo, two flutes, three oboes (third doubling on English horn), two clarinets, bass clarinet, two bassoons, contrabassoon, four horns, three trumpets, two tenor trombones, bass trombone, tuba, timpani, cymbals, bass drum, snare drum, triangle, wood block, Indian toms, sand paper, celesta, bells, wind whistle, harp, and strings.

== Recordings ==
On September 7, 1927, Grofe and the Whiteman Orchestra gathered at Victor's Trinity Church Studio in Camden, New Jersey to record "Mississippi Suite (A Tone Journey)." The Orchestra consisted of three violins, bass, two violas, two cellos, bassoon, four saxophones, three cornets, three trombones, tuba, banjo, and traps. Part One was completed in four takes, and Part Two in three. Take 1 was scrapped, Take 2 was held, and Take 3 was selected as the master. The fourth take of Part One was also scrapped.

Part One take 3 and Part Two take 3 made up the two sides of the 12" shellac disc. The disc was limited by the technology of 1927, which could only cut so many grooves on each side. With the limit in mind, Grofe and Whiteman had the Orchestra play Sections 2 and 3 (Huckleberry Finn and Old Creole Days) to make Part One, and Section 4 (Mardi Gras) for Part Two. Section 1 (Father of the Waters) was not attempted. It would be many years before "Mississippi" was recorded in its entirety. Victor 35859 was released in early 1928.

Grofé's Mississippi Suite and Grand Canyon Suite, performed by the Eastman-Rochester Orchestra (i.e. the Orchestra of the Eastman School of Music), conducted by Howard Hanson, were recorded for Mercury Records in May 1958, re-issued on CD in 1995, coupled with the Cello Concerto No. 2 in E minor op. 30 by Victor Herbert, with Georges Miquelle, Cello. (Mercury Living Presence CD 434 355–2). This was the first stereo recording of it.

The first full recording of the work, as Grofé composed and orchestrated it for Paul Whiteman, was made in 2004 by Steven Richman conducting the Harmonie Ensemble/New York and released in 2006 (Bridge Records 9212).
