= Ferde Grofé =

American composer, arranger, pianist and instrumentalist (1892–1972)

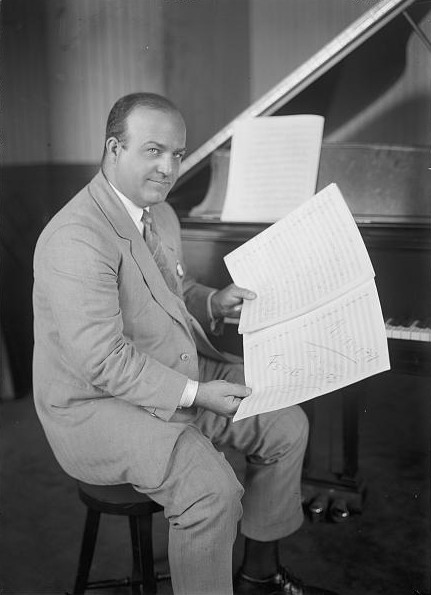
Ferde Grofé

Ferdinand Rudolph von Grofé (March 27, 1892 – April 3, 1972), known as Ferde Grofé (/ˈfɜːrdi ɡroʊˈfeɪ/) was an American composer, arranger, pianist, and instrumentalist. He is best known for his 1931 five-movement symphonic poem the Grand Canyon Suite, and for orchestrating George Gershwin's Rhapsody in Blue for its 1924 premiere.

During the 1920s and 1930s, he went by the name Ferdie Grofé.

== Early life ==
Grofé was born on 127 East Third Street, New York City, in 1892 to German immigrants. He came by his extensive musical interests naturally. His family included several musicians. His father, Emil von Grofé, was a baritone who mainly performed in light opera. His mother, Elsa Johanna Bierlich von Grofé, was a professional cellist and a versatile music teacher who taught Ferde to play both the violin and the piano. Elsa's father, Bernard Bierlich, was a cellist in the Metropolitan Opera Orchestra in New York, and her brother, Julius Bierlich, was the first violinist and concertmaster of the Los Angeles Symphony.

== Musical education ==
Ferde's father died in 1899, after which his mother took him abroad to study piano, viola, and composition in Leipzig, Germany. Ferde became proficient on a wide range of instruments including piano (his favored instrument), violin, viola (he became a violist in the LA Symphony), baritone horn, alto horn, cornet and drums. This command of musical instruments and composition gave Ferde the foundation to become, first an arranger of other composers' music, and then a composer in his own right.

Grofé left home at age 14 and variously worked as a milkman, truck driver, usher, newsboy, elevator operator, helper in a book bindery, iron factory worker, and played in a piano bar for two dollars a night, and as an accompanist. He continued studying piano and violin. When he was 15 he was performing with dance bands. He also played the alto horn in brass bands. He was 17 when he wrote his first commissioned work, "Elks' Grand Reunion March & Two-step".

== Arranger for Paul Whiteman ==
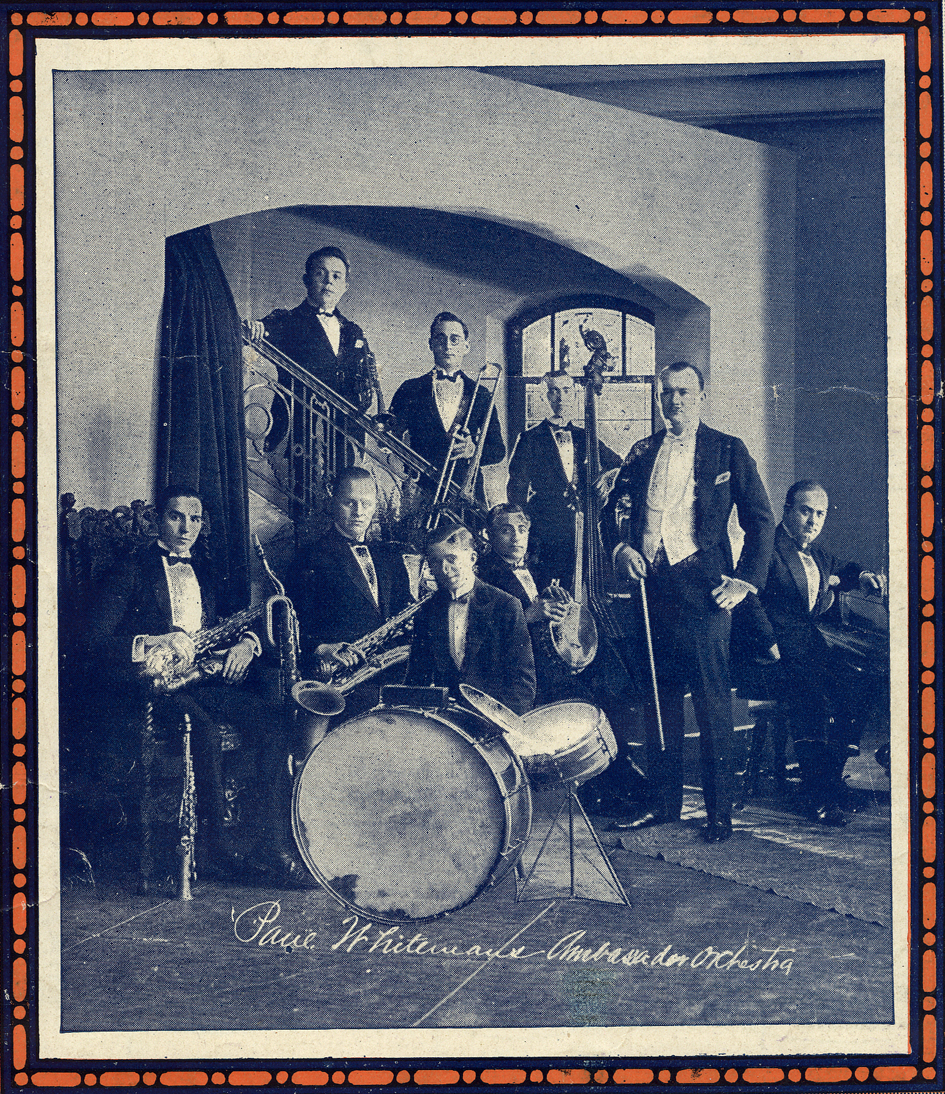
Paul Whiteman and his orchestra, 1921

Beginning in 1920, he played piano with the Paul Whiteman orchestra. He served as Whiteman's chief arranger from 1920 to 1932. He made hundreds of arrangements of popular songs, Broadway show music, and tunes of all types for Whiteman. One commentator said Grofé, while arranging for Whiteman, "conceived the idea of instrumental contrasts, especially of the 'harmonic chorus,'" where "some solo instrument, usually a saxophone, softly croons the melody as a chordal accompaniment is achieved by the brass."

Grofé's most memorable arrangement is that of George Gershwin's Rhapsody in Blue, which established Grofé's reputation among musicians. Grofé took what Gershwin had written for two pianos and orchestrated it for Whiteman's orchestra. He transformed Gershwin's musical canvas with the colors and many of the creative touches for which it is so well known. It was Grofé's arrangement that was first performed by George Gershwin and the Paul Whiteman Orchestra in New York's Aeolian Hall on February 12, 1924. He went on to create two more arrangements of the piece in later years. Grofé's 1942 orchestration for full orchestra of Rhapsody in Blue is the one most frequently heard today. In 1928, Gershwin wrote a letter to ASCAP complaining that Grofé had listed himself as a composer of Rhapsody in Blue. The dispute was settled, with Grofé receiving a portion of the music royalties for the piece. Despite this misunderstanding, Grofé served as one of the pallbearers at Gershwin's funeral in 1937.

In 1932, The New York Times called Grofé "the Prime Minister of Jazz". This was an oblique reference to the fact that Whiteman was widely called "King of Jazz", especially after the appearance of the 1930 King of Jazz film which featured Whiteman and his music.

During this time, Grofé also recorded numerous piano rolls for the American Piano Company (Ampico) in New York. Some captured performances were embellished with additional notes after the initial recording took place to attempt to convey the thick lush nature of his orchestra's style. Hence those published rolls are marked "Played by Ferdie Grofé (assisted)".

Not everybody appreciated Grofé's flowery arrangements during this time. In a review of a Whiteman jazz concert in New York, one writer said the music was expected to be pleasing, and "it proved so when it was repeated last night, in spite of the excessive instrumentation of Ferde Grofé." A writer of a later generation said "the Grofé and Gould pieces were the essence of slick commercialism..."

== Radio, TV, conducting and teaching ==
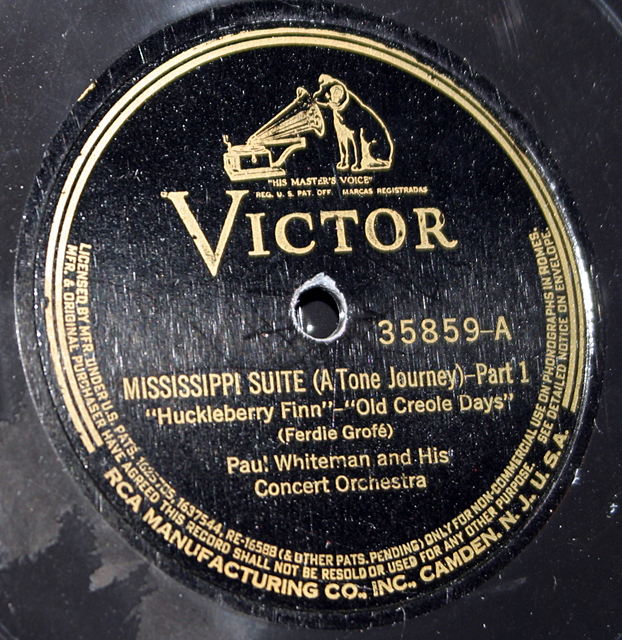
1928 Victor Records release of the Mississippi Suite

Mardi Gras (from Mississippi Suite) was recorded in the radio transcription series Shilkret Novelties in 1931. and again by Nathaniel Shilkret in RCA Victor's transcription series His Master's Voice of the Air in 1932. "On the Trail" (from Grand Canyon Suite) was also recorded in the His Master's Voice of the Air transcriptions.

During the 1930s, he was the orchestra leader on several radio programs, including Fred Allen's show, the George Burns and Gracie Allen show and his own The Ferde Grofé Show. The "On the Trail" segment of Grand Canyon Suite was used for many years as the "musical signature" for radio and television programs sponsored by Philip Morris cigarettes, beginning with their 1933 radio program featuring Grofé and his orchestra and concluding with I Love Lucy (1951–57). Jon Hendricks wrote lyrics for "On the Trail", and the song was recorded for Hendricks' album To Tell the Truth (1975). The piano version sheet music of the suite includes lyrics to the central section of "On the Trail" by songwriter Gus Kahn.

Several times he conducted orchestral programs in New York's Carnegie Hall. On March 25, 1938, Ferde Grofe and his Symphony Orchestra played a concert at Carnegie Hall for the benefit of "Free Milk Fund for Babies, Inc.", Mrs. William Randolph Hearst, President and Founder. The concert included a number of premieres, with George Gershwin's "Three Preludes" for orchestra (scored by Ferde Grofé) featured.

In January 1933 the premiere of his Tabloid, an orchestral suite in four movements, was presented in Carnegie Hall. In 1937, he conducted a concert tribute to George Gershwin at Lewisohn Stadium. The turnout (20,223 people) was the largest in that stadium's history. In 1934, Grofé announced he was working on an opera, to be based on the Edgar Allan Poe story "The Fall of the House of Usher".

In 1943, he was a guest on Paul Whiteman Presents. In 1944, he was a panelist on A Song Is Born radio show, judging the works of unknown composers. Before that time he had served several times as judge or co-judge in musical contests. Grofé was later employed as a conductor and faculty member at the Juilliard School of Music, where he taught orchestration.

== Grofé's compositions ==
In addition to being an arranger, Grofé was a composer in his own right. While still with Whiteman, in 1926, he wrote Mississippi Suite, which Whiteman recorded in a shortened format in 1927. He wrote a number of other pieces, including a theme for the 1939 New York World's Fair and suites for Niagara Falls and the Hudson River. Possibly as a result of his World's Fair theme, October 13, 1940, was designated "Ferde Grofé Day" at the American pavilion of the World's Fair. In 1961, Grofé conducted his Niagara Falls Suite as part of the ceremony marking the opening of the first stage of the Niagara Falls Power Generation project.

Other notable compositions by Grofé were the Death Valley Suite and a music production about Mark Twain. The Death Valley Suite is a short symphonic suite written by Grofé in 1949, depicting the westward travels of pioneers through the "harsh lands" of Death Valley in California. Grofé was commissioned by the Death Valley 49ers, a nonprofit organization devoted to preserving the pioneering and mining history of the Death Valley region encompassing Death Valley National Monument (now Death Valley National Park) and the surrounding area. The composition and music was part of a pageant performed on December 3, 1949, celebrating the 100th anniversary of the Forty-niners who came by way of Death Valley in search of gold and other riches, as well as celebrating the California state centennial (1850–50). The 1949 pageant setting was outdoors at Desolation Canyon in Death Valley. Grofé was the conductor, and actor James Stewart was the narrator. In 1960, work was announced on a musical production based on the life of Mark Twain. The music was first assigned to Victor Young, but Grofé was later brought in to complete the work.

Grofé is best known for his composition of the Grand Canyon Suite (1931), a work regarded highly enough to be recorded for RCA Victor with the NBC Symphony conducted by Arturo Toscanini (in Carnegie Hall in 1945, with the composer present). The earlier Mississippi Suite along with the later Death Valley Suite are occasionally performed and recorded. Grofé conducted the Rochester Philharmonic Orchestra in his Grand Canyon Suite and his piano concerto (with pianist Jesús María Sanromá) for Everest Records in 1960; the recording was digitally remastered and issued on CD in 1997.

In 1958, Walt Disney released a live-action, short subject film of the Grand Canyon using the Grand Canyon Suite music. The 30-minute Technicolor and CinemaScope film, entitled Grand Canyon, used no actors or dialogue, simply shots of the Grand Canyon itself and several animals around the area, all shown with Grofé's music accompanying the visuals. The short won an Academy Award for Best Live Action Short Subject, and was shown as a featurette accompanying Disney's 1959 Sleeping Beauty. Today, the Grand Canyon Suite's third movement, "On the Trail", can be heard playing as the Disneyland Railroad passes the Grand Canyon sections of the "Grand Circle Tour" of Disneyland.

Robert Moses, master urban planner, commissioned Grofé to compose the music for the 1964 New York World's Fair. The fair's opening day's big musical performance was Paul Lavalle conducting a 94-piece orchestra in the world premiere of Grofé's "World's Fair Suite". Moses had previously commissioned Grofé to compose the theme for his 1939 New York World's Fair. Mr. Grofé was present, listening from a wheelchair, having suffered a stroke in 1961. His score was in five movements—"Unisphere", "International", "Fun at the Fair", "Pavilions of Industry" and "National".

== Films ==
Grofé began his second career as a composer of film scores in 1930, when he provided arrangements (and perhaps portions of the score) for the film King of Jazz. Published data for this movie do not list Grofé as the score's composer, however. He is also credited with the film score for the 1930 movie Redemption.

A review for the 1944 Joseph Lewis film Minstrel Man stated, "the music, scored by Ferde Grofé, is an outstanding item." Grofé was nominated, along with Leo Erdody, for an Academy Award in the category "Scoring of a Musical Picture" for this film.

The score he composed for Rocketship X-M (1950) was the first science fiction movie to feature the electronic instrument known as the theremin.

His other original film scores included Early to Bed (1928), Diamond Jim (1935), Time Out of Mind (1947) and The Return of Jesse James (1950).

== Personal life ==
Although he spent the first half of his life living in New Jersey and working in and around New York City, by 1945, he had moved to Los Angeles full-time. In 1945, he also sold his Teaneck, New Jersey home.

Grofé married his first wife, Mildred Fanchette Grizzelle, a lyric soprano singer, in San Francisco, CA, on March 14, 1916, and divorced in 1928. In May 1951, he filed for divorce in Las Vegas from his second wife, Ruth, whom he had married in 1929. The day after the divorce was granted, he married his third wife, Anna Mae Lampton (January 13, 1952).

== Death ==
Ferde Grofé died in Santa Monica, California, on April 3, 1972, aged 80, and was buried in the Mausoleum of the Golden West at the Inglewood Park Cemetery in Inglewood, California. He left four children, Ferdinand Rudolf Jr., Anne, Robert, and Delight, all of the Los Angeles area.

== Compositions ==
Grofé composed a large number of works in a variety of styles, commonly in symphonic jazz.

=== Orchestral works ===
- Broadway at Night (1924)
- Theme and Variations on Noises from a Garage (1925)
- Mississippi Suite (Tone Journey) (1926)
- Three Shades of Blue (1927)
- Metropolis: a Fantasy in Blue (1928)
- Free Air (1928)
- Over There Fantasie (WWI Patriotic Medley) (c.1929) also known as the Ode to the American Soldier
- Grand Canyon Suite (1931)
- Knute Rockne (1931) tone poem
- Blue Flame (1931)
- Rip Van Winkle (1932–54) Grofé worked on this tone poem for over two decades, before starting over and reworking the thematic material into the Hudson River Suite
- Tabloid: Four Pictures of a Modern Newspaper (1933)
- A Day At The Farm, for orchestra (1934–35)
- Madison Square Garden Suite (1930s)
- Christmas Eve, for orchestra (1934)
- Killarney (An Irish Fantasy) (1934)
- Ode to the Star Spangled Banner, for orchestra, first performance of autograph score given in 2014
- A Symphony in Steel (1936)
- Jewel Tones Suite (1936) Consisting of Ruby, Emerald, Diamond, Sapphire and Opal
- Yankee Doodle Rhapsody (American Fantasie) film score (1936)
- Jungle Ballet (1937)
- Rudy Vallee Suite (1937)
- Ode to Freedom, for orchestra (1937)
- Café Society (1938) a ballet, score rediscovered and repremiered in 2010
- Tin Pan Alley: The Melodic Decades (1938)
- Kentucky Derby Suite (1938)
- Six Pictures of Hollywood (1938) also known as the Hollywood Suite, reworked thematic material from his earlier Hollywood Ballet
- Trylon and Perisphere (1939) one movement tone poem for the New York World's Fair of 1939–40 (later renamed Black Gold)
- Wheels, for orchestra (1939) dedicated to the Ford dealers of America
- An American Biography, for orchestra (1939–40) about the life of and dedicated to Henry Ford
- Uncle Sam Stands Up (1941) a patriotic cantata, based on a text by Ben Hecht, for baritone solo, chorus, and orchestra
- Billy the Kid, unfinished and unpublished, some of this material may have been used in his score for the movie The Return of Jesse James
- Aviation Suite (1944). Movements: The Take-Off, Glamour Girl, Plane Loco, Clouds, Happy Landing
- March for Americans (1945)
- Deep Nocturne for orchestra (1947)
- Death Valley Suite (1949)
- Lincoln's Gettysburg Address (1954)
- Hudson River Suite (1955). Movements: The River, Henry Hudson, Rip Van Winkle, Albany Night Boat, New York
- Dawn at Lake Mead, for orchestra (1956)
- Valley of the Sun Suite (1957)
- Yellowstone Suite (1960)
- San Francisco Suite (1960)
- Niagara Falls Suite (1960–61)
- World's Fair Suite (1964)
- Atlantic Crossing (1965), a tone poem for orchestra, and chorus with both male and female narrators
- Hawaiian Suite (1965)
- Halloween Fantasy for Pizzicato Strings (1966) also known as Trick or Treat for Orchestra
- Requiem for a Ghost Town (1968)

=== Concertos ===
- Saxophone Concerto (1939) unfinished, unpublished work written for Cecil Leeson
- Concerto for Piano and Orchestra in D minor (1958) a long one-movement concerto Grofé had been working on since 1931

=== Ballets ===
- Tabloid Ballet (1930)
- Jungle Ballet (1937) written at the request of Dimitri Tiomkin
- Hollywood Ballet, (1938, revised 1940), later rearranged and restored, and released as the Hollywood Suite
- Café Society (1938) a ballet, score rediscovered and repremiered in 2010

=== Movie scores ===
- Early to Bed (1928) silent film score
- King Of Jazz (1930) arranger, probable contributing composer
- Redemption (1930)
- Diamond Jim (1935)
- Yankee Doodle Rhapsody (1937) short film score
- Minstrel Man (1940) nominated for an Academy Award
- Time Out of Mind (1947) rejected score
- Rocketship X-M (1950)
- The Return of Jesse James (1950)
- A Christmas Story (1983) Several movements of the Grand Canyon Suite were used in the film score

=== Works for concert band ===
- Elks' Grand Reunion March & Two-step (1909) his first commissioned work, for an Elks Club Convention in Los Angeles
- Scalawag (1956)
- Valley of Enchantment Suite (1956)

=== Chamber music and solo works ===
- Four Rags for Piano (1906) Grofé's first compositions, written at the age of 14
  1. Harlem
  2. Rattlesnake
  3. Persimmon
  4. Hobble
- Souvenir (1907) for solo cello, written for Grofé's grandfather
- Evening Shadows (1907–08, pub. 1915) for solo piano
- Wonderful One (1920; pub. 1923) for female vocalist and piano. Music by Paul Whiteman and Ferdie Grofé. Words by Dorothy Terriss. Adapted from a theme by Marshall Neilar
- Sonata for Flute and Bicycle Pump
- A Sailor's Reward (1926) A Musical Drama of the Sea - for Ukulele in D
- Queen of Egypt (1933) for piano. Music by Ferdie Grofé & Peter De Rose, Lyric by Billy Colligan
- Ruby (1936) for piano, from the suite "Jewel Tones"
- Miss Mischief (1937) for piano, dedicated to Shirley Temple
- Diana, for solo saxophone and piano
- Templed Hills (pub. 1940) popular song
- Table d'Hôte (1945) for flute, violin and viola
- Festiviana (1949) A Modern Composition for the Piano
- Grofe's Serenade (pub. 1949) for piano, dedicated to his wife
- Gallodoro's Serenade for Saxophone and Piano (1958) written for the virtuoso Al Gallodoro
- Valsanne (1959) for solo saxophone and piano
- Lonely Castle (1968) for solo flute
- Christine (1969) for cello and piano
- Sequoia (1970, Final Opus) for flute, oboe, and strings

Since 2010, the scores Requiem for a Ghost Town, the ballet Café Society and the Ode to the Star-Spangled Banner have been performed in newly published musicological scores based on the manuscripts on file with the Library of Congress.

== Selected discography ==
- Grofé's Grand Canyon Suite, performed by the NBC Symphony, conducted by Arturo Toscanini. On LP and on the recently out-of-print CD, it is coupled with works by George Gershwin, and (on the CD) Samuel Barber and John Philip Sousa.
- Grofé's Grand Canyon Suite and Mississippi Suite, performed by the Eastman-Rochester Orchestra (i.e. the Orchestra of the Eastman School of Music), conducted by Howard Hanson, recorded for Mercury Records in May 1958, re-issued on CD in 1995, coupled with the Cello Concerto No. 2 in E minor op. 30 by Victor Herbert, with Georges Miquelle, Cello. (Mercury Living Presence CD 434 355-2).
- Grofé's Grand Canyon Suite, performed by the New York Philharmonic (with John Corigliano, Sr. as the violin soloist) conducted by Leonard Bernstein. Coupled with Bernstein conducting Gershwin’s Rhapsody in Blue (with Bernstein at the piano) and An American in Paris (Sony 63086)
- Grofé's Grand Canyon Suite, performed by the Detroit Symphony Orchestra conducted by Antal Doráti. Coupled with Doráti conducting Gershwin's Porgy and Bess: A Symphonic Picture (London/Decca Jubilee 430712)
- Symphonic Jazz: Grofé and Gershwin, performed by the Harmonie Ensemble/New York conducted by Steven Richman (Bridge Records 9212), playing:
  - Grofé's Mississippi Suite (the original Whiteman Orchestra version)
  - Gershwin's Second Rhapsody for Orchestra with Piano arranged by Grofé, with Lincoln Mayorga on the piano (premiere recording)
  - Grofé's Gallodoro's Serenade for Saxophone and Piano with Al Gallodoro on alto saxophone and Mayorga on piano (premiere recording)
  - Grofé's Grand Canyon Suite (original Whiteman Orchestra version; first complete recording)
- Grofé's Grand Canyon Suite and Concerto for Piano and Orchestra (with Jesús María Sanromá) with the Rochester Philharmonic Orchestra conducted by Grofé. Out-of-print Everest LP, reissued on CD in 1997.
- Grofé's Grand Canyon Suite, performed by the Boston Pops orchestra, conducted by Arthur Fiedler (RCA #6806)
- The Allen Music Library at Florida State University has a collection of 144 reel-to-reel audio recordings and 47 cassette tape recordings. Many of these recordings are live performances that range from 1936-1968.

== See also ==
- List of jazz arrangers
- Chord names and symbols (popular music) – Jerry Gates, a professor of Berklee College of Music, tells that he has heard chord symbols came from Ferde Grofé and Jelly Roll Morton.

== Sources ==
- Liner notes by Don Rayno for Symphonic Jazz: Grofé and Gershwin (Bridge Records 9212)
