= Eugene Pallette =

American actor (1889–1954)

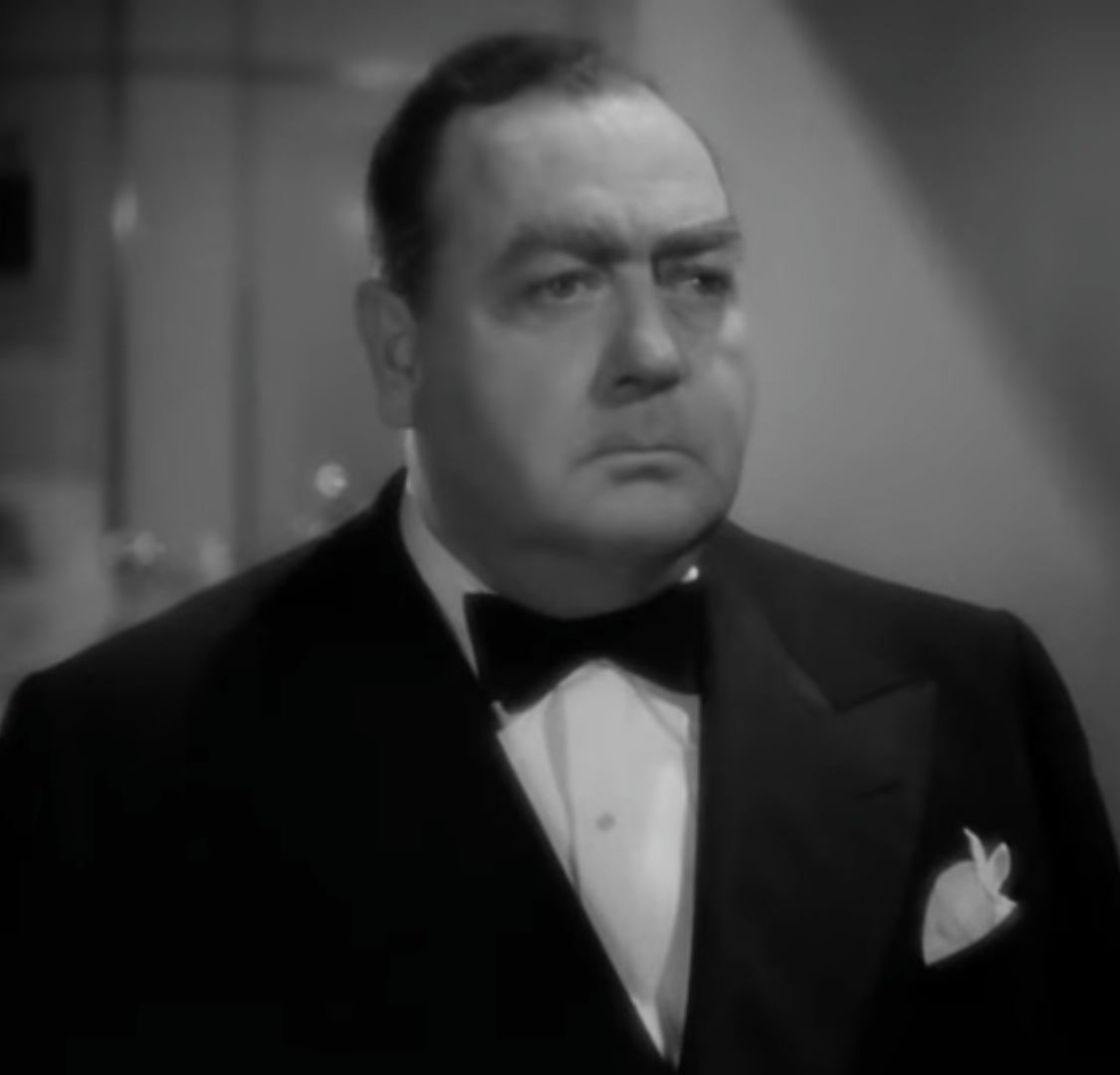
- Pallette in My Man Godfrey (1936)
- Born: Eugene William Pallette; July 8, 1889; Winfield, Kansas, U.S.
- Died: September 3, 1954 (aged 65); Los Angeles, California, U.S.
- Occupation: Actor
- Years active: 1910–1946
- Known for: My Man Godfrey; The Adventures of Robin Hood; The Mark of Zorro
- Spouses: Phyllis Gordon (m. 1912; div. 1920) Marjorie Cagnacci (m. 1932)

Eugene William Pallette (July 8, 1889 – September 3, 1954) was an American actor who worked in both the silent and sound eras, performing in more than 240 productions between 1913 and 1946. After an early career as a slender leading man, Pallette became a stout character actor. He had a deep, gravelly voice, which some critics have likened to the sound of a croaking frog, and is probably best-remembered for comic character roles such as Alexander Bullock (Carole Lombard's character's father) in My Man Godfrey (1936), Friar Tuck in The Adventures of Robin Hood (1938), and his similar role as Fray Felipe in The Mark of Zorro (1940). He also co-starred in Mr. Smith Goes to Washington (1939) and Heaven Can Wait (1943).

== Early life ==
Eugene Pallette was born in Winfield, Kansas, the son of William Baird Pallette and Elnora "Ella" Jackson. His parents had both been stage actors in their younger years, but by 1889 (the year of Pallette's birth) his father was working as an insurance salesman. His sister was Beulah L. Pallette.

Pallette attended Culver Military Academy in Culver, Indiana. He also worked as a jockey, and did a stage act which included three horses.

== Career ==
Pallette began his acting career on the stage in stock company roles, appearing for six years.

=== Silent films ===
Pallette began his silent film career as an extra and stunt man in 1910 or 1911. His first credited appearance was in the one-reel short Western/drama The Fugitive (1913), which was directed by Wallace Reid for Flying "A" Studios at Santa Barbara. The up-and-coming actor was also sharing an apartment with actor Wallace Reid.

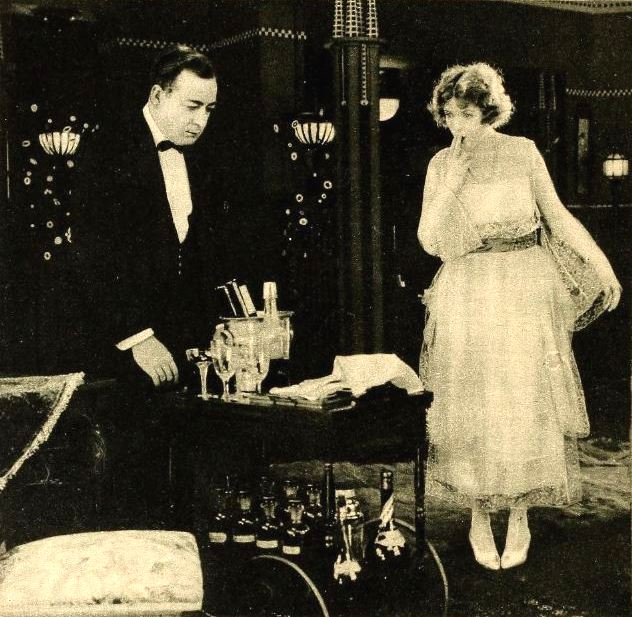
Pallette with May Allison in Fair and Warmer (1920)

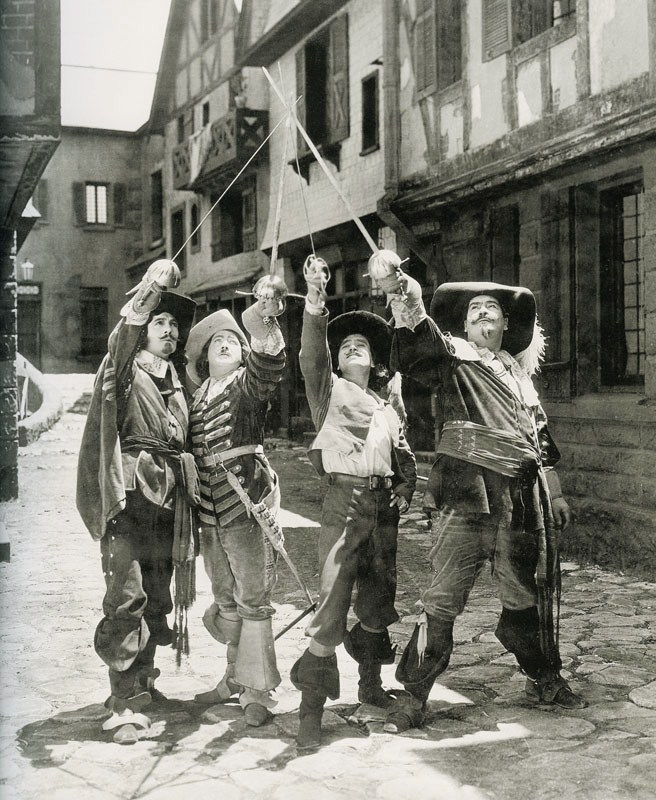
Léon Bary, Pallette, Douglas Fairbanks, and George Siegmann in The Three Musketeers (1921)

Quickly advancing to featured status, Pallette was cast in many Westerns. He worked with D. W. Griffith on such films as The Birth of a Nation (1915), where he played two parts, one in blackface, and Intolerance (1916). He also played a Chinese role in Tod Browning's The Highbinders. At this time, Pallette had a slim, athletic figure, a far cry from his portly build later in his career. He starred as the slender, sword-fighting swashbuckler Aramis in Douglas Fairbanks' 1921 version of The Three Musketeers, one of the great smash hits of the silent era. However, his girth had begun to get stockier, ending his ambitions of becoming a leading man. Discouraged, Pallette left Hollywood for the oil fields of Texas, where he both made and lost a sizable fortune of $140,000 (equivalent to $2,527,052 in 2025) in the same year. Eventually, he returned to film work.

After gaining a great deal of weight, he became one of the screen's most recognizable character actors. In 1927, he signed as a regular for Hal Roach Studios and was a reliable comic foil in several early Laurel and Hardy movies. In later years, Pallette's weight may have topped out at more than 300 pounds (136 kg).

=== Sound films ===
The advent of the talkies proved to be the second major career boost for Pallette. In 1929, he appeared as "Honey" Wiggin in the 1929 talkie The Virginian. His inimitable, rasping gravel voice (described as "half an octave below anyone else in the cast") made him one of Hollywood's most sought-after character actors in the 1930s and '40s.

The typical Pallette role was gruff, aggravated, and down to earth. He played the comically exasperated head of the family (e.g., My Man Godfrey, The Lady Eve, Heaven Can Wait), the cynical backroom sharpy (Mr. Smith Goes to Washington), and the gruff police sergeant in five Philo Vance films, including The Kennel Murder Case. Pallette thus appeared in more Philo Vance films than any of the 10 actors who played the aristocratic lead role of Vance. Pallette's best-known role may be as Friar Tuck in The Adventures of Robin Hood; he made a similar appearance as Friar Felipe two years later in The Mark of Zorro.

BBC commentator Dana Gioia described Pallette's onscreen appeal:

The mature Pallette character is a creature of provocative contradictions—tough-minded but indulgent, earthy but epicurean, relaxed but excitable. His grit and gravel voice sounds simultaneously tough and comic. ... Pallette uses his girth to create a common touch. Stuffed into a tuxedo that seems perpetually near bursting, he seems more down-to-earth than the stylish high society types who surround him.

Pallette was cast as the father of lead actress Jeanne Crain for the film In the Meantime, Darling (1944). Director Otto Preminger clashed with Pallette and claimed he was "an admirer of Hitler and convinced that Germany would win the war". Pallette refused to sit at the same table with black actor Clarence Muse in a scene set in a kitchen. "You're out of your mind, I won't sit next to a nigger," Pallette hissed at Preminger. Preminger furiously informed Fox studio head Darryl F. Zanuck, who fired Pallette. Although Pallette remains in scenes he already had filmed, the remainder of his role not yet shot was eliminated from the script. However, a 1953 issue of the African-American magazine Jet listed Pallette as being among the attendees of a Hollywood banquet honoring the then "oldest Negro actress in the world", Madame Sul-Te-Wan. For his part, Pallette always maintained that a medical problem with his throat ended his career.

In increasingly ill health by his late 50s, Pallette made fewer and for lesser studios. His final movie, Suspense, was released in 1946.

== Later life ==
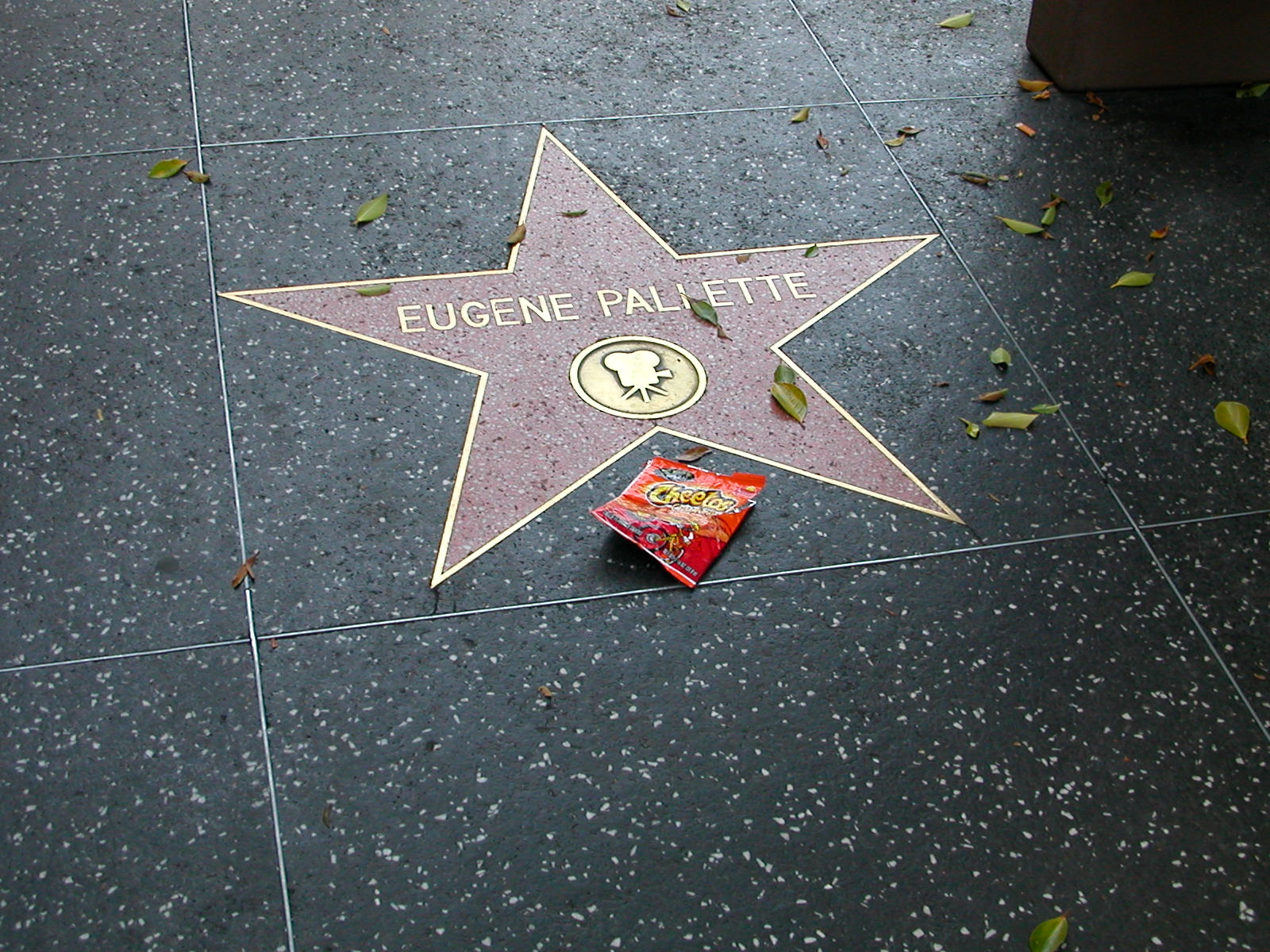
Eugene Pallette's star on the Hollywood Walk of Fame

In 1946, convinced that a "world blow-up" by atomic bombs was coming, the hawkish Pallette received considerable publicity when he set up a "mountain fortress" on a 3,500-acre (14 km^{2}) ranch near Imnaha, Oregon, as a hideaway from universal catastrophe. The "fortress" reportedly was stocked with a sizable herd of prized cattle and enormous supplies of food and had its own canning plant and lumber mill.

When the "blow-up" he anticipated failed to materialize after two years, he began disposing of the Oregon ranch and returned to Los Angeles and his movie colony friends. He never appeared in another movie, however.

Eugene Pallette died at age 65 in 1954 from throat cancer at his apartment, 10835 Wilshire Boulevard, in Los Angeles. His wife, Marjorie, and his sister, Beulah Phelps, were at his side. Private funeral services were conducted on Saturday, September 4, 1954, at the Armstrong Family Mortuary.

He has a star on the Hollywood Walk of Fame at 6702 Hollywood Boulevard for his contribution to motion pictures.

== Filmography ==
Year	Film	Role	Director	Notes
1913	The Fugitive	The Fugitive		Short; Lost film
1913	When the Light Fades	John Robertson		Short; Lost film
1915	The Birth of a Nation	Union Soldier	D. W. Griffith	Uncredited
1915	The Highbinders	Hop Woo	Tod Browning	Short; Lost film
1915	The Story of a Story	The Author	Tod Browning	Short; Lost film
1915	The Spell of the Poppy	Manfredi	Tod Browning	Short; Lost film
1916	Sunshine Dad	Alfred Evergreen	Edward Dillon	
1916	The Children in the House	Arthur Vincent		
1916	Going Straight	Jimmy Briggs	S.A. Franklin	
1916	Hell-to-Pay Austin	Harry Tracey	Paul Powell	Lost film
1916	Gretchen the Greenhorn	Rodgers	Sidney A. Franklin	
1916	Intolerance	Prosper Latour	D. W. Griffith	
1917	Each to His Kind	Dick Larimer	Edward LeSaint	Lost film
1917	The Winning of Sally Temple	Sir John Gorham	George Melford	
1917	The Bond Between	Raoul Vaux	Donald Crisp	Lost film
1917	The Lonesome Chap	George Rothwell	Edward LeSaint	Lost film
1917	The Marcellini Millions	Mr. Murray	Donald Crisp	
1917	The World Apart	Clyde Holt	William Desmond Taylor	Lost film
1917	The Heir of the Ages	Larry Payne	Edward LeSaint	
1917	The Ghost House	Spud Foster	William C. deMille	Lost film
1918	Madam Who?	Lieutenant Conroy	Reginald Barker	Incomplete film
1918	His Robe of Honor	Clifford Nordhoff	Rex Ingram	Lost film
1918	Tarzan of the Apes		Scott Sidney	
1918	A Man's Man	Capt. Benevido	Oscar Apfel	Lost film
1918	The Turn of a Card	Eddie Barrett	Oscar Apfel	Lost film
1918	Breakers Ahead	Jim Hawley	Charles Brabin	Lost film
1918	Viviette	Dick Ware	Walter Edwards	Lost film
1918	No Man's Land	Sidney Dundas	Will S. Davis	
1919	Words and Music by -	Gene Harris		
1919	The Amateur Adventuress	George Goodie	Henry Otto	Lost film
1919	Be a Little Sport	Dick Nevins	Scott Dunlap	Lost film
1919	Fair and Warmer	Billy Bartlett	Henry Otto	Lost film
1920	Alias Jimmy Valentine	'Red' Jocelyn	Arthur D. Ripley	Lost film
1920	Terror Island	Guy Mourdant	James Cruze	Incomplete film
1920	Parlor, Bedroom and Bath	Reggie Irving	Edward Dillon	Lost film
1920	Twin Beds		Lloyd Ingraham	Lost film
1921	Fine Feathers	Bob Reynolds	Fred Sittenham	
1921	The Three Musketeers	Aramis	Fred Niblo	
1922	Two Kinds of Women	Old Carson	Colin Campbell	Lost film
1922	Without Compromise	Tommy Ainsworth	Emmett J. Flynn	Lost film
1923	A Man's Man	Captain Benevido		Lost film
1923	To the Last Man	Simm Bruce	Victor Fleming	
1923	Hell's Hole	Pablo	Emmett J. Flynn	Lost film
1923	North of Hudson Bay	Peter Dane	John Ford	
1923	The Ten Commandments	Israelite Slave	Cecil B. DeMille	Uncredited
1924	The Wolf Man	Pierre	Edmund Mortimer	Lost film
1924	The Galloping Fish	Anti-Volstead Esquire	Del Andrews	uncredited
1924	Wandering Husbands	Percy	William Beaudine	
1924	The Cyclone Rider	Eddie	Tom Buckingham	
1924	Stupid, But Brave	Banana King	Roscoe Arbuckle	Short
1925	The Light of Western Stars	Stub	William K. Howard	Lost film
1925	Ranger of the Big Pines		W.S. Van Dyke	Lost film
1925	Wild Horse Mesa	Melberne Townsman	George B. Seitz	Uncredited
1925	Without Mercy	Simon Linke	George Melford	
1926	The Fighting Edge	Simpson	Henry Lehrman	Lost film
1926	Rocking Moon	Side Money	George Melford	Lost film
1926	The Volga Boatman	Revolutionary	Cecil B. DeMille	Uncredited
1926	Whispering Canyon	Harvey Hawes		
1926	Mantrap	E. Wesson Woodbury	Victor Fleming	
1926	You Never Know Women	Party Guest	William Wellman	Uncredited
1926	Desert Valley	Deputy	Scott R. Dunlap	
1927	Should Men Walk Home?	Detective, Intelligence Bureau	Leo McCarey	Short
1927	Enemies of Society	Barney Mulholland	Ralph Ince	
1927	Fluttering Hearts	Motorcycle Cop	James Parrott	Short
1927	Sugar Daddies	Hardy Look-alike	Leo McCarey	Short
1927	The Second Hundred Years	Dinner Host	Fred Guiol	Short; uncredited
1927	Chicago	Rodney Casley	Frank Urson	
1927	The Battle of the Century	Insurance agent	Clyde Bruckman	Short; uncredited
1928	Lights of New York	Gene	Bryan Foy	
1928	The Good-Bye Kiss	The Captain	Mack Sennett	Lost film
1928	Out of the Ruins	Volange	John Francis Dillon	Lost film
1928	The Red Mark	Sergeo	James Cruze	
1928	His Private Life	Henri Bérgere	Frank Tuttle	Lost film
1928	The Swell Head		Bryan Foy	Short
1929	The Canary Murder Case	Sgt. Ernest Heath	Malcolm St. Clair	
1929	The Dummy	Madison	Robert Milton	
1929	The Studio Murder Mystery	Detective Lieutenant Dirk	Frank Tuttle	
1929	The Greene Murder Case	Sgt. Ernest Heath	Frank Tuttle	
1929	The Virginian	'Honey' Wiggin	Victor Fleming	
1929	The Love Parade	War Minister	Ernst Lubitsch	
1929	Pointed Heels	Joe Carrington	A. Edward Sutherland	
1930	The Kibitzer	Klaus	Edward Sloman	
1930	Slightly Scarlet	Sylvester Corbett	Edwin H. Knopf	
1930	Men Are Like That	Traffic Cop	Frank Tuttle	
1930	The Benson Murder Case	Sgt. Ernest Heath	Frank Tuttle	
1930	Paramount on Parade	Sergeant Heath	Edmund Goulding and 10 other directors	Murder Will Out
1930	The Border Legion	Bunco Davis	Otto Brower	
1930	Let's Go Native	Deputy Sheriff 'Careful' Cuthbert	Leo McCarey	
1930	The Sea God	Square Deal McCarthy	George Abbott	
1930	Follow Thru	J.C. Effingham	Lloyd Corrigan	
1930	The Santa Fe Trail	Doc Brady	Edwin H. Knopf	
1930	Playboy of Paris	Pierre Bourdin	Ludwig Berger	
1930	Sea Legs	Hyacinth Nitouche	Victor Heerman	
1931	Fighting Caravans	Seth	Otto Brower and David Burton	
1931	It Pays to Advertise	Cyrus Martin	Frank Tuttle	
1931	The Stolen Jools	Reporter #1	William C. McGann	Short
1931	Gun Smoke	Stub Wallack	Edward Sloman	
1931	Dude Ranch	Judd/Black Jed	Frank Tuttle	
1931	Huckleberry Finn	Duke of Bridgewater	Norman Taurog	
1931	Girls About Town	Benjamin Thomas	George Cukor	
1932	Shanghai Express	Sam Salt	Josef von Sternberg	
1932	Dancers in the Dark	Gus	David Burton	
1932	Strangers of the Evening	Detective Brubacher	H. Bruce Humberstone	
1932	Thunder Below	Bill Horner	Richard Wallace	
1932	Tom Brown of Culver	Deaf Diner	William Wyler	uncredited
1932	The Night Mayor	Hymie Shane	Benjamin Stoloff	
1932	Wild Girl	Yuba Bill	Raoul Walsh	
1932	The Half-Naked Truth	Achilles	Gregory La Cava	
1932	Off His Base	Jerry of the Journal	James Gleason	Shorts
1932	Always Kickin'	Jerry of the Journal	James Gleason	Shorts
1932	A Hockey Hick	Jerry of the Journal	James Gleason	Shorts
1933	Hell Below	Chief Torpedo Man	Jack Conway	
1933	Made on Broadway	Mike Terwilliger	Harry Beaumont	
1933	Storm at Daybreak	Janos	Richard Boleslawski	
1933	Shanghai Madness	Lobo Lonergan	John G. Blystone	
1933	The Kennel Murder Case	Detective Heath	Michael Curtiz	
1933	From Headquarters	Sgt. Boggs	William Dieterle	
1933	Mr. Skitch	Cliff Merriweather	James Cruze	
1934	Cross Country Cruise	Willy Bronson	Edward Buzzell	
1934	Caravan	Gypsy Chief	Erik Charell	
1934	I've Got Your Number	Joe Flood	Ray Enright	
1934	Strictly Dynamite	Sourwood	Elliott_Nugent| (unbilled)	
1934	Friends of Mr. Sweeney	Wynn Rixey	Edward Ludwig	
1934	The Dragon Murder Case	Sgt. Heath	H. Bruce Humberstone	
1934	One Exciting Adventure	Kleinsilber	Ernst L. Frank	
1934	Something Simple	Conventionaire		Short; uncredited
1935	Bordertown	Charlie Roark	Archie Mayo	
1935	All the King's Horses	Conrad Q. Conley	Frank Tuttle	
1935	Baby Face Harrington	Uncle Henry	Raoul Walsh	
1935	Black Sheep	Col. Upton Calhoun Belcher	Allan Dwan	
1935	Steamboat Round the Bend	Sheriff Rufe Jeffers	John Ford	
1935	The Ghost Goes West	Mr. Joe Martin	René Clair	
1936	The Golden Arrow	Mr. Meyers	Alfred E. Green	
1936	My Man Godfrey	Alexander Bullock	Gregory La Cava	
1936	Dishonour Bright	Busby	Tom Walls	
1936	The Luckiest Girl in the World	Campbell Duncan	Edward Buzzell	
1936	Easy to Take	Dr. Reginald Kraft aka Doc	Glenn Tryon	
1936	Stowaway	The Colonel	William A. Seiter	
1937	Clarence	Mr. Wheeler	George Archainbaud	
1937	The Crime Nobody Saw	'Babe' Lawton	Charles Barton	
1937	She Had to Eat	Raymond Q. Nash	Malcolm St. Clair	
1937	Topper	Casey	Norman Z. McLeod	
1937	One Hundred Men and a Girl	John R. Frost	Henry Koster	
1938	The Adventures of Robin Hood	Friar Tuck	Michael Curtiz and William Keighley	
1938	There Goes My Heart	Editor	Norman Z. McLeod	
1939	Wife, Husband and Friend	Mike Craig	Gregory Ratoff	
1939	Mr. Smith Goes to Washington	Chick McGann	Frank Capra	
1940	First Love	James Clinton	Henry Koster	
1940	Young Tom Edison	Mr. Nelson	Norman Taurog	
1940	It's a Date	Gov. Allen	William A. Seiter	
1940	Sandy Is a Lady	P.J. Barnett	Charles Lamont	
1940	He Stayed for Breakfast	Maurice Duval	Alexander Hall	
1940	A Little Bit of Heaven	Herrington	Andrew Marton	
1940	The Mark of Zorro	Fray Felipe	Rouben Mamoulian	
1941	Ride, Kelly, Ride	Duke Martin	Norman Foster	
1941	The Lady Eve	Mr. Pike	Preston Sturges	
1941	The Bride Came C.O.D.	Lucius K. Winfield	William Keighley	
1941	World Premiere	Gregory Martin	Ted Tetzlaff	
1941	Unfinished Business	Elmer	Gregory La Cava	
1941	Swamp Water	Sheriff Jeb McKane	Jean Renoir	
1941	Appointment for Love	George Hastings	William A. Seiter	
1942	The Male Animal	Ed Keller	Elliott Nugent	
1942	Almost Married	Doctor Dobson	Charles Lamont	
1942	Are Husbands Necessary?	Bunker	Norman Taurog	
1942	Lady in a Jam	Mr. John Billingsley	Gregory La Cava	
1942	Tales of Manhattan	Luther	Julien Duvivier	
1942	The Big Street	Nicely Nicely Johnson	Irving Reis	
1942	The Forest Rangers	Howard Huston	George Marshall	
1942	Silver Queen	Steve Adams	Lloyd Bacon	
1943	It Ain't Hay	Gregory Warner	Erle C. Kenton	
1943	Slightly Dangerous	Durstin	Buster Keaton	
1943	Heaven Can Wait	E.F. Strabel	Ernst Lubitsch	
1943	The Kansan	Tom Waggoner	George Archainbaud	
1943	The Gang's All Here	Andrew Mason Sr.	Busby Berkeley	
1944	Pin Up Girl	Barney Briggs	H. Bruce Humberstone	
1944	Sensations of 1945	Gus Crane	Andrew Stone	
1944	Step Lively	Simon Jenkins	Tim Whelan	
1944	In the Meantime, Darling	Henry B. Preston	Otto Preminger	
1944	Heavenly Days	Senator Bigbee	Howard Estabrook	
1944	Lake Placid Serenade	Carl Cermak	Steve Sekely	
1945	The Cheaters	James C. Pidgeon	Joseph Kane	
1946	Deadline at Dawn	Man In Crowd	Harold Clurman	uncredited
1946	In Old Sacramento	Sheriff Jim Wales	Joseph Kane	
1946	Suspense	Harry Wheeler	Frank Tuttle	
