= Early to Bed =

Early to Bed may refer to:

- Early to Bed (1928 film), a Laurel and Hardy short
- Early to Bed (1933 film), a British-German romantic comedy directed by Ludwig Berger
- Early to Bed (1936 film), an American comedy directed by Norman Z. McLeod
- Early to Bed (1941 film), an animated short starring Donald Duck
- Early to Bed (musical), a 1943 Broadway musical
