= Omar Khayyam (1923 film) =

Omar Khayam
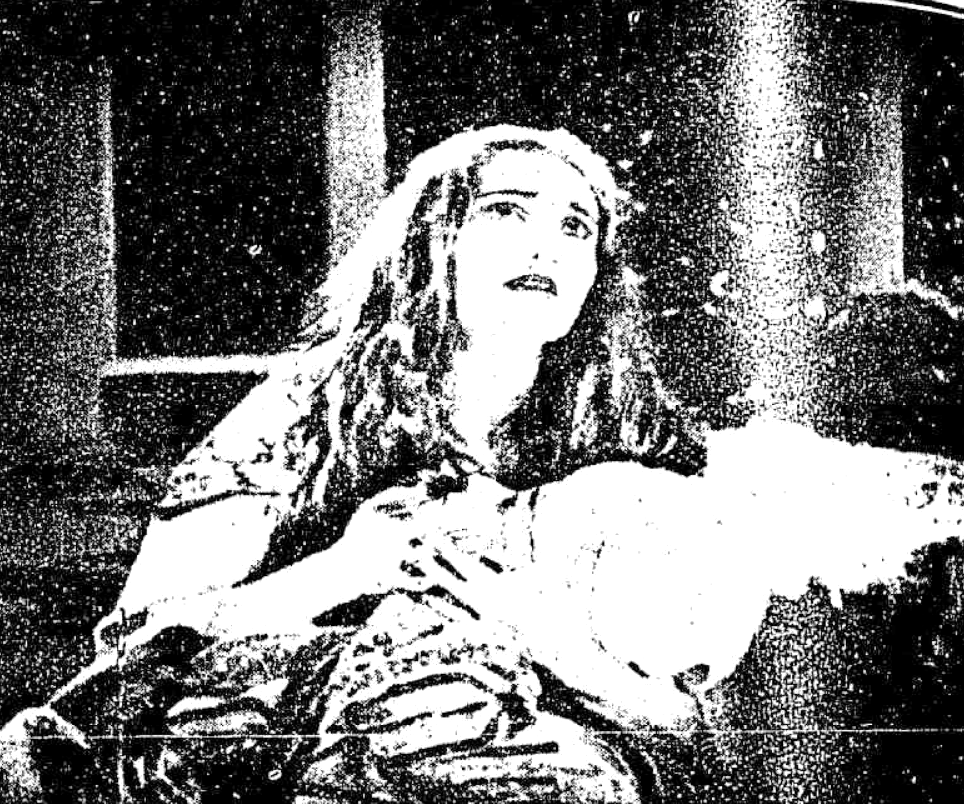
- Newspaper illustration
- Directed by: Ferdinand P. Earle, jun.
- Based on: Rubaiyat of Omar Khayyam by Omar Khayyam (Edward Fitzgerald rendition)
- Starring: Ramon Novarro; Kathleen Key
- Release date: 1923
- Country: United States
- Language: Silent

Omar Khayam is an American silent movie. It was widely distributed in Australia in 1923, where it was praised for its imaginative technical effects. It bears many similarities to the lost film A Lover's Oath, which was made in 1921 but not released until 1925.

== Plot ==
The story, through which many images of Persian life and thought are interspersed, concerns three boyhood friends, Omar, Nizam and Hassan, who made a solemn pact that whichever became successful would share his good fortune with the others. Nizam grew to become ruler of the country, and assisted Omar in his studies. Hassan became a scheming scoundrel whose lusting after the beautiful Shirin was cut short by his clever wife. The film concludes with the lovers "beneath the boughs".

The film includes many scenes relating to verses from the Rubaiyat of Omar Khayyam, including the market places, the Sultan and his courtiers, the muezzin calling the faithful to prayer, the crowd clamoring at the tavern door, the potter molding his wet clay, gardens ablaze with roses, ruined temples and palaces, Heaven and Hell. Images of astronomical phenomena were especially praised. The film opened at Hoyts' cinemas in Sydney ("Australia" and "Apollo" theatres) on 17 February and Melbourne ("De Luxe") on 24 February 1923.

== Cast ==
- Frederick Warde as Omar
- Edwin Stevens as Hassan
- Paul Weigel as Sheik Rustan
- B. Post (perhaps Guy Bates Post) as the Vizier (Note: One critic, who saw the film in Chicago, remembers Guy Bates Post as an awkward and poorly cast Omar.)
- Kathleen Key as Shirin, daughter of the Sheik
- Ramon Novarro (often cited as Raymond Navarro) as her lover

"and a cast of over 7,000 people"

Director was Ferdinand P. Earle, jun.

The film was presented throughout Australia by E. R. Chambers and E. O. Gurney of "Selected Super Films (Australasia Ltd)". Gurney has elsewhere been mentioned as an Australian film director who, like John Farrow, left for Hollywood.

The film was then taken to Hobart's Strand theatre and to Adelaide, where it was shown at the Town Hall and hailed as a "masterpiece" and the "last word in artistic achievement of motion picture history". It went on to regional Victoria and New South Wales, where it was universally well received — "the picture magnificent, which no-one should miss" It reached Perth in September.

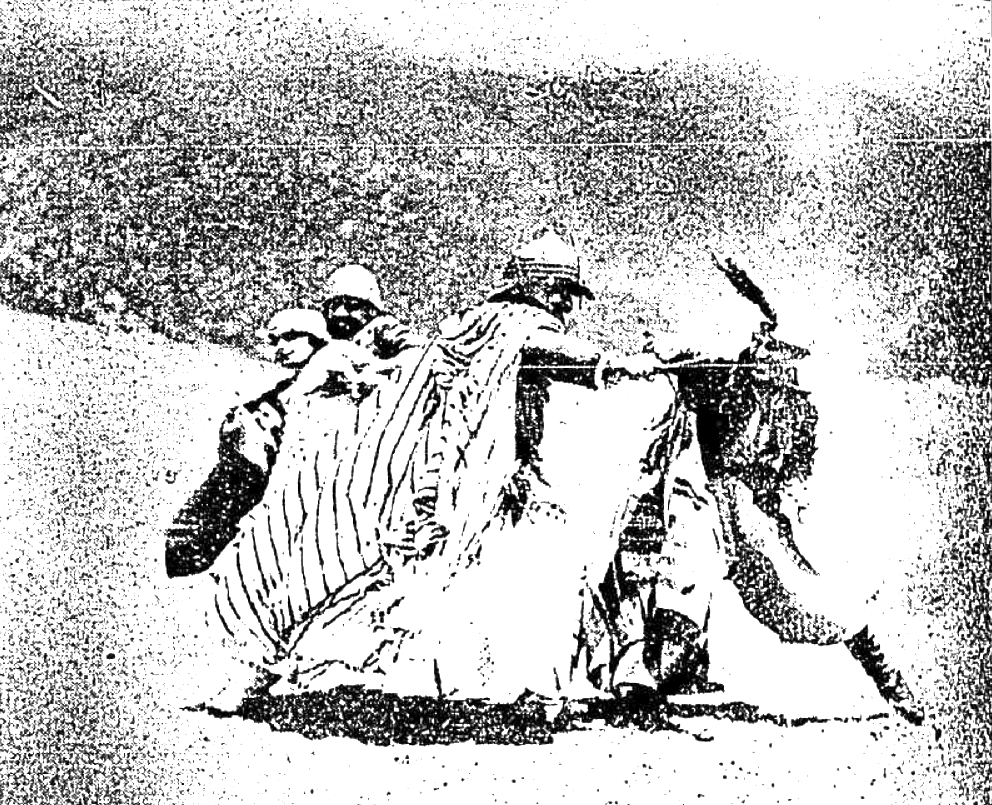
Scene from Omar Khayam

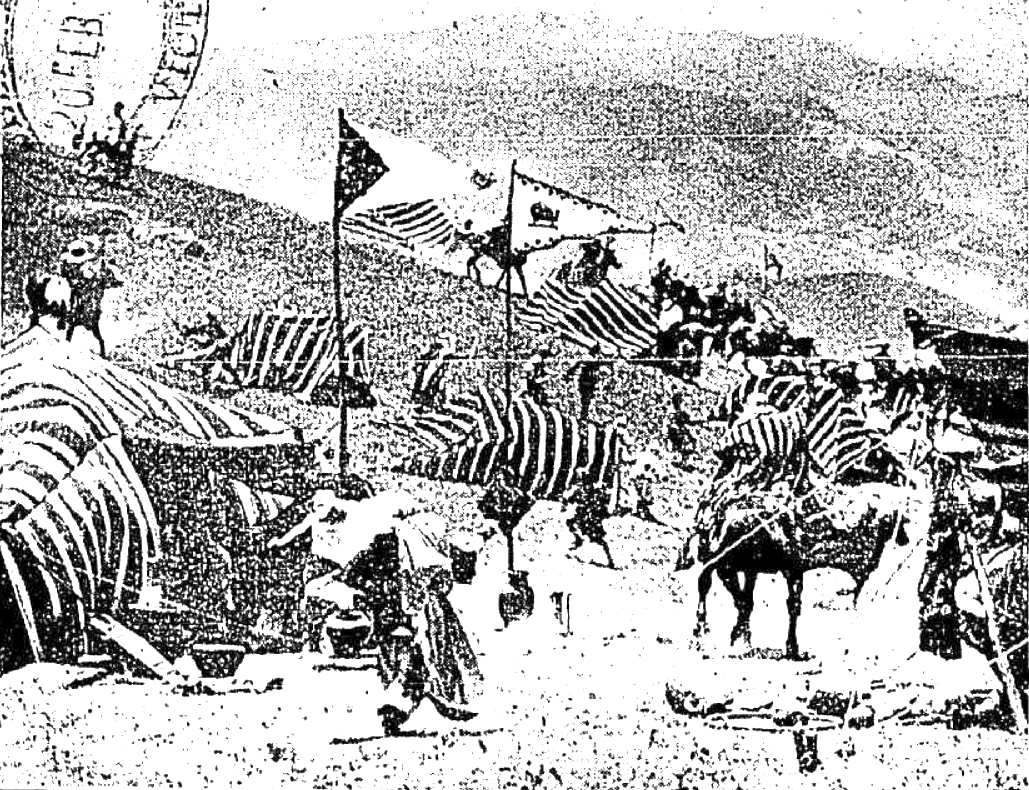
Scene from Omar Khayam

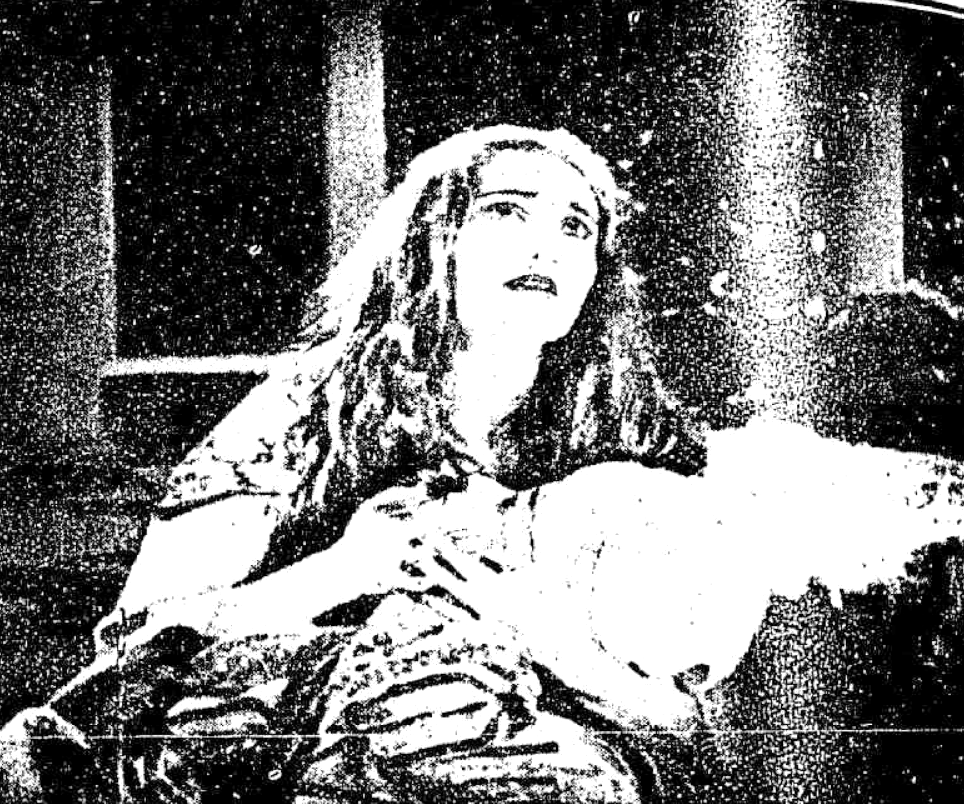
Scene from Omar Khayam

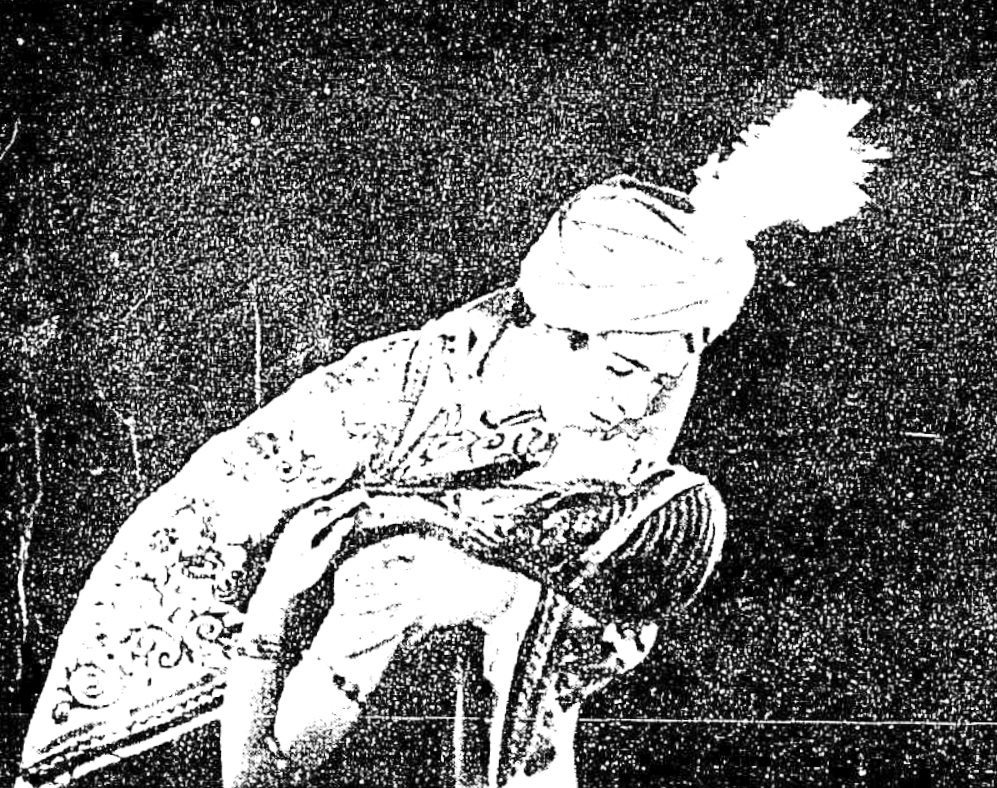
Scene from Omar Khayam

== Omar the Tentmaker ==
Richard Walton Tully's play Omar the Tentmaker, depicting illicit love in the harems, was in 1921 made into a film, directed by its author, and starring Virginia Brown Faire and Guy Bates Post. It was shown in Australia around the same time as Omar Khayyam. Australian publicity for the film referenced FitzGerald's Rubaiyat, though descriptions of the film seem remote from the poetry, or the life, of the historic Omar Khayyam, who despite his surname (which means "tentmaker"), was a renowned astronomer and mathematician.
