= Hell's Hole =

1923 film

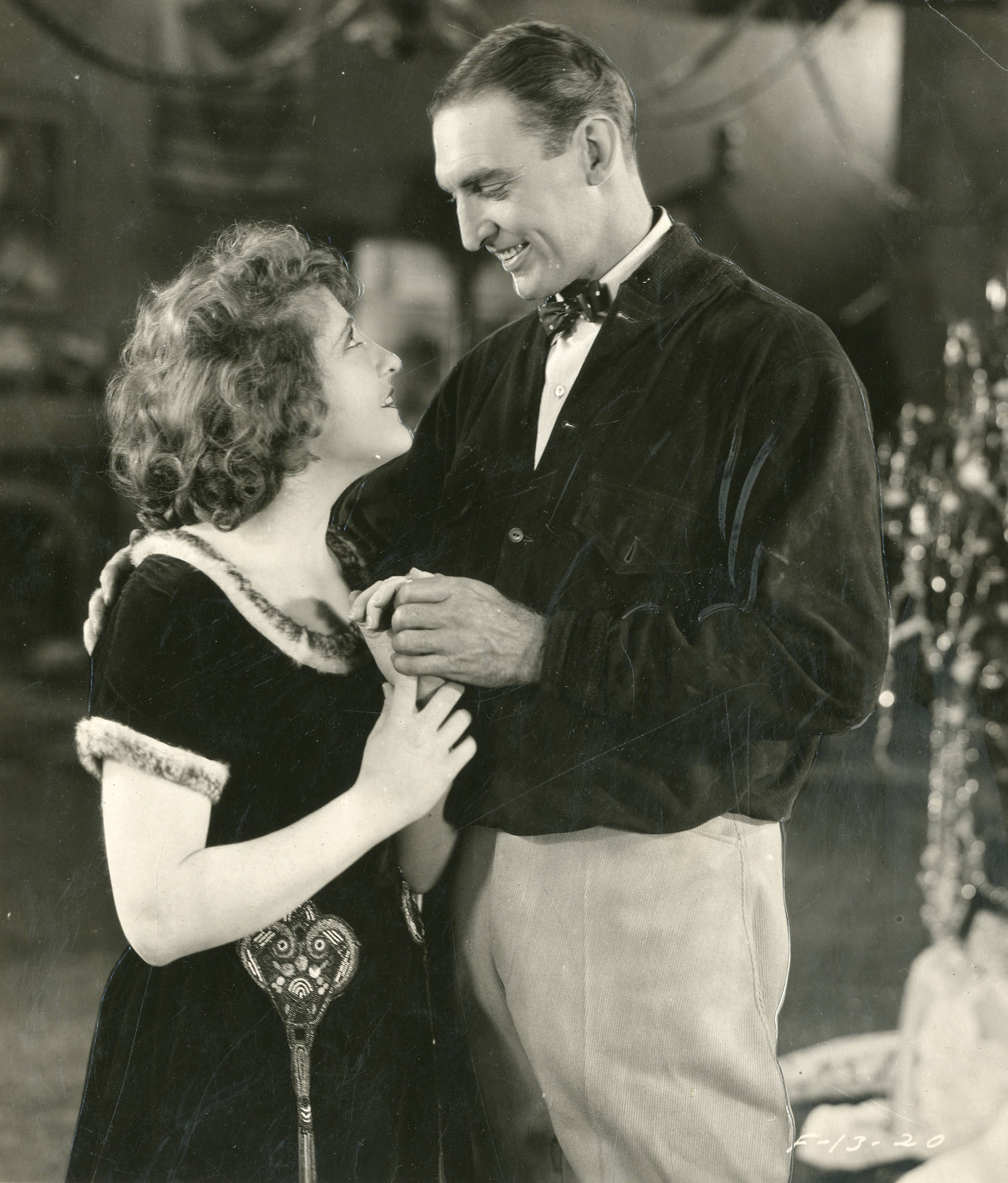
- Still with Maurice Bennett Flynn and Ruth Clifford
- Directed by: Emmett J. Flynn
- Screenplay by: Bernard McConville
- Story by: George Scarborough
- Starring: Buck Jones; Maurice Bennett Flynn; Ruth Clifford; Eugene Pallette; George Siegmann; Kathleen Key
- Cinematography: Lucien Andriot
- Production company: Fox Film Corporation
- Distributed by: Fox Film Corporation
- Release date: September 23, 1923
- Running time: 60 minutes
- Country: United States
- Language: Silent (English intertitles)

Hell's Hole is a lost 1923 American silent Western film directed by Emmett J. Flynn and written by Bernard McConville. The film stars Buck Jones, Maurice Bennett Flynn, Ruth Clifford, Eugene Pallette, George Siegmann, and Kathleen Key. The film was released on September 23, 1923, by Fox Film Corporation.

== Cast ==
- Buck Jones as Tod Musgrave
- Maurice Bennett Flynn as Dell Hawkins
- Ruth Clifford as Dorothy Owen
- Eugene Pallette as Pablo
- George Siegmann as Conductor
- Kathleen Key as Mabel Grant
- Hardee Kirkland as The Warden
- Charles K. French as The Sheriff
- Rube Miller as Prisoner
- Fred Kohler as Prisoner
- Dick Sutherland as Prisoner

== Preservation ==
With no prints of Hell's Hole located in any film archives, it is a lost film.
