= The Desert's Toll =

1926 film

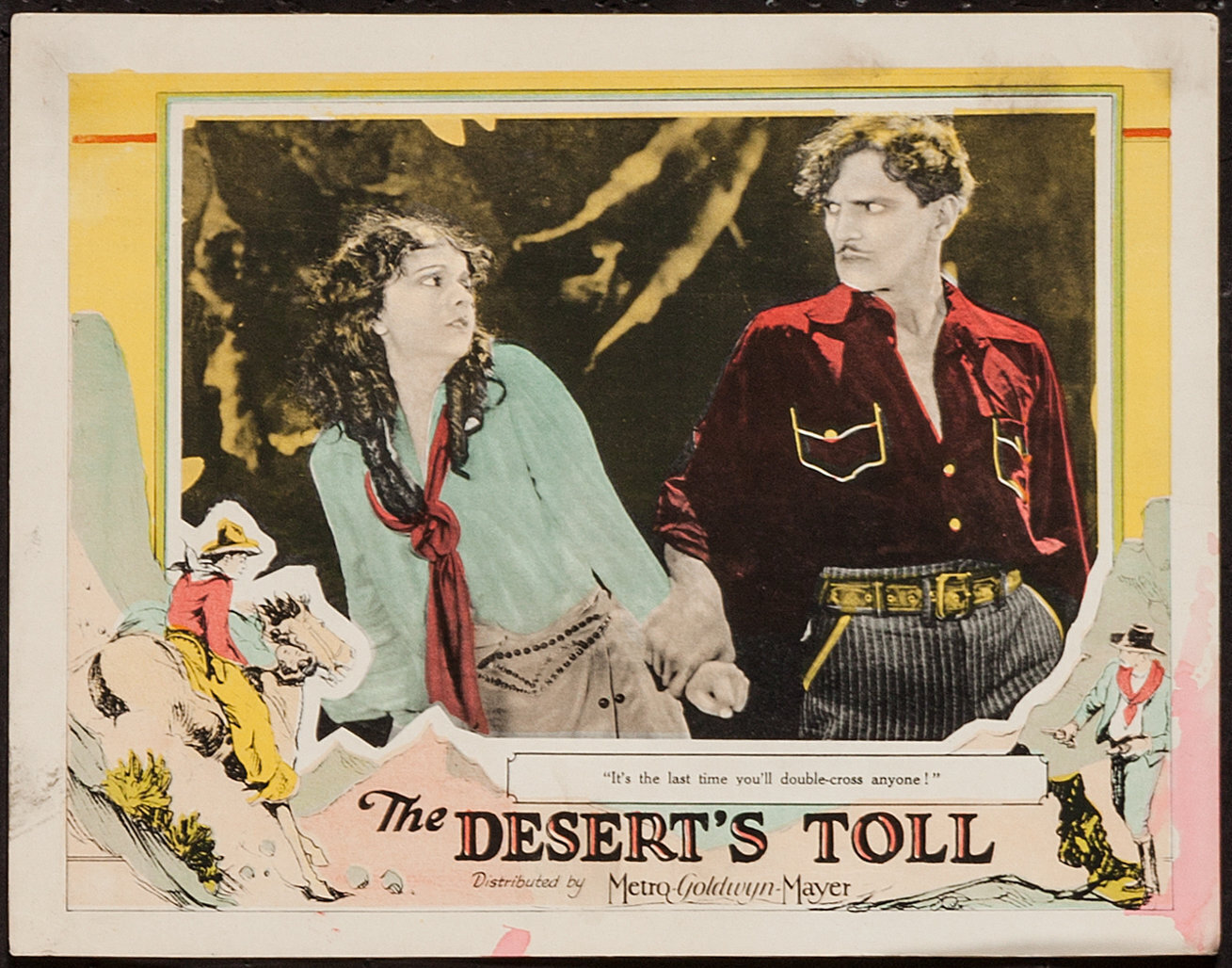
- Lobby card
- Directed by: Clifford Smith
- Written by: Gardner Bradford (titles)
- Starring: Francis McDonald; Kathleen Key; Anna May Wong
- Cinematography: Jack Roach; George Stevens
- Distributed by: Metro-Goldwyn-Mayer
- Release date: November 14, 1926
- Running time: 6 reels
- Country: United States
- Language: Silent (English intertitles)

The Desert's Toll is a 1926 American silent Western film directed by Clifford Smith and starring Kathleen Key, Francis McDonald, and Tom Santschi.

== Plot ==
Frank Darwin needs to convince Muriel he did not kill her Father, as claimed by Jasper and Oneta.

== Cast ==
- Kathleen Key as Muriel Cooper
- Francis McDonald as Frank Darwin
- Tom Santschi as Jasper
- Anna May Wong as Oneta
- Lew Meehan as Henchman
- Guinn "Big Boy" Williams as Henchman
- Chief John Big Tree as Red Eagle

== Preservation ==
A print of The Desert's Toll is preserved in the George Eastman Museum Motion Picture Collection.
