= A Bachelor's Wife =

American 1919 silent drama short film

A Bachelor’s Wife
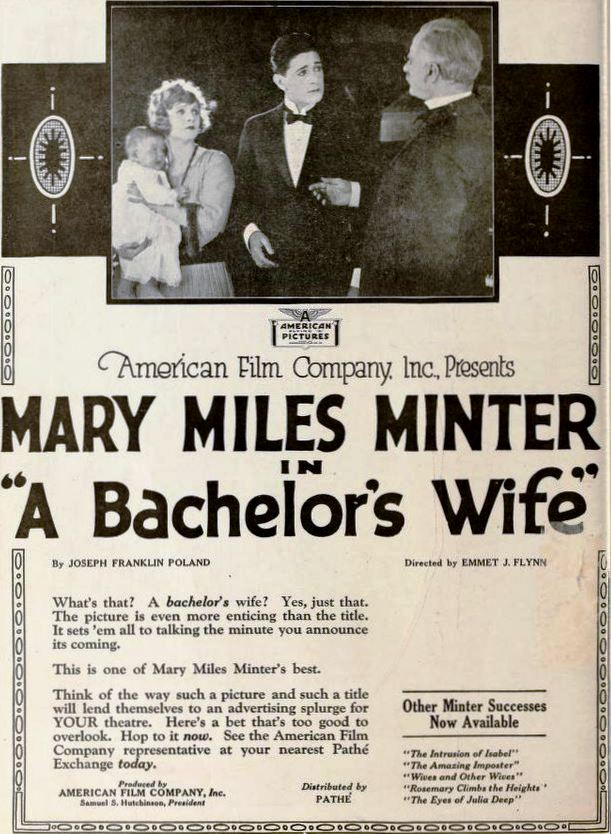
- Advertisement from Moving Picture World May 31, 1919
- Directed by: Emmett J. Flynn
- Written by: Joseph F. Poland
- Starring: Mary Miles Minter
- Production company: American Film Manufacturing Company
- Distributed by: Pathé
- Release date: June 1, 1919 (United States)
- Running time: 5 reels
- Country: United States
- Language: Silent (English intertitles)

A Bachelor's Wife is a 1919 American silent drama film directed by Emmett J. Flynn and starring Mary Miles Minter. As with many of Minter's films, the film is thought to be a lost film. In the weeks before its release, some film magazines listed the feature under its working title “Mary O’Rourke.”

== Plot ==
As described in Motion Picture Herald, Mary O’Rourke arrives in America from Ireland and finds her young friend and baby deserted by the husband. Mary takes the baby to the Stuyvesant mansion, demanding that it be recognized. Mrs. Stuyvesant, an invalid, is delighted with the child, and mistaking Mary for her daughter-in-law, invites her to stay and take charge of the house. The doctor informs Mary that she must comply with the old lady's request, as a shock might prove fatal to her. John Stuyvesant arrives home and denounces Mary as an imposter. She admits that she is but insists that he shall do right by Norah. He insists he was never married, and to prove it starts to marry another girl. Mary confronts him with the marriage license, which it appears belongs to J. Frederick Stuyvesant, a cousin. He had failed to acknowledge Norah as his wife while waiting to come into his fortune. Things straighten themselves out, Norah and the child come into their own and Mary and John decide to marry.

== Cast ==
- Mary Miles Minter as Mary O’Rourke
- Allan Forrest as John Stuyvesant
- Myrtle Reeves as Norah Cavanagh
- Lydia Knott as Mrs Stuyvesant
- Charles Spere as Fred Stuyvesant
- Margaret Shelby as Genevieve Harbison
- Harry Holden as Dr Burt
