= North of Hudson Bay =

1923 film directed by John Ford

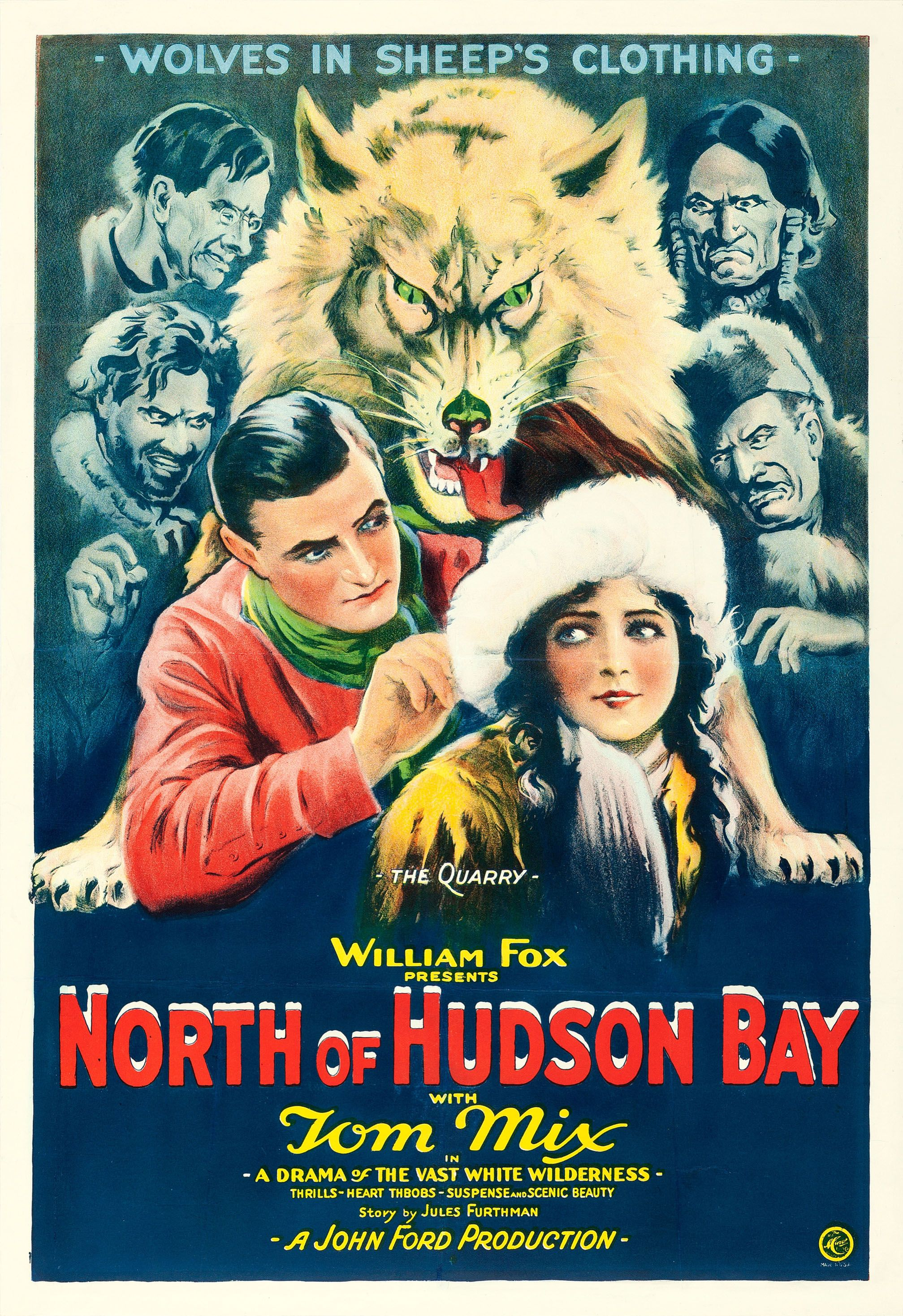
- Theatrical release poster
- Directed by: John Ford
- Written by: Jules Furthman
- Starring: Tom Mix; Kathleen Key
- Cinematography: Daniel B. Clark
- Production company: Fox Film Corporation
- Distributed by: Fox Film Corporation
- Release date: November 18, 1923
- Running time: 50 minutes
- Country: United States
- Language: Silent (English intertitles)

North of Hudson Bay is a 1923 American silent action film directed by John Ford starring Tom Mix and Kathleen Key. It was released as North of the Yukon in Great Britain.

== Plot ==
North of Hudson Bay (1923)

As described in a film magazine review, Peter Dane is assassinated at the Hudson's Bay trading post. His brother, Michael, arrives at the post by steamboat. While attempting to retrieve Estelle McDonald's hat from the water, Michael falls in love with her. However, when he becomes a suspect in the murder, Michael is banished to the wilderness along with Angus McKenzie, the accused murderer of his brother. Estelle, who is trying to escape from an unwanted suitor and his group, joins them. Together, they engage in a fierce fight before making their escape in a canoe through the treacherous rapids.

== Cast ==
- Tom Mix as Michael Dane
- Kathleen Key as Estelle McDonald
- Jennie Lee as Dane's mother
- Frank Campeau as Cameron McDonald
- Eugene Pallette as Peter Dane
- Will Walling as Angus McKenzie
- Frank Leigh as Jeffrey Clough
- Fred Kohler as Armand LeMoir

== Preservation ==
Approximately 40 minutes of footage are in existence. Prints of the film also exist in several United States and European film archives and collections.

== See also ==
- Tom Mix filmography
