= The Trouble Shooter =

1924 film

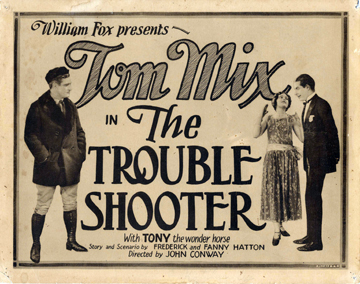
- Lobby card
- Directed by: Jack Conway
- Written by: Fanny Hatton; Fredric Hatton
- Produced by: William Fox
- Starring: Tom Mix; Kathleen Key
- Cinematography: Daniel B. Clark
- Distributed by: Fox Film Corporation
- Release date: May 4, 1924 (US)
- Running time: 6 reels
- Country: United States
- Language: Silent (English intertitles)

The Trouble Shooter is a 1924 American silent Western film directed by Jack Conway and starring Tom Mix and Kathleen Key.

== Plot ==
As described in a film magazine review, Tom Steele, chief electrician for the Ajax Power Company, goes to register a section of land just thrown open for occupancy by the Government, the ownership of which is to be claimed by the first to stake it off. He falls in love with Nancy Brewster, the daughter of the rival company's president. Francis Earle, an unsuccessful suitor for Nancy's hand, plots to obtain the land for himself. After many adventures and with help of Nancy, whom he rescues from a storm in the mountains, Tom defeats his enemies and wins the love of Nancy.

== Cast ==
- Tom Mix as Tom Steele
- Kathleen Key as Nancy Brewster
- Frank Currier as Benjamin Brewster
- J. Gunnis Davis as Pete Highley/Francis Earle
- Mike Donlin as Chet Conners
- Dolores Rousse as Chiquita
- Charles McHugh as Scotty McTavish
- Al Fremont as Stephen Kirby
- Tony the Horse

== Preservation ==
A print of The Trouble Shooter is preserved in a European film archive.

== See also ==
- Tom Mix filmography
