= A Lover's Oath =

1925 film

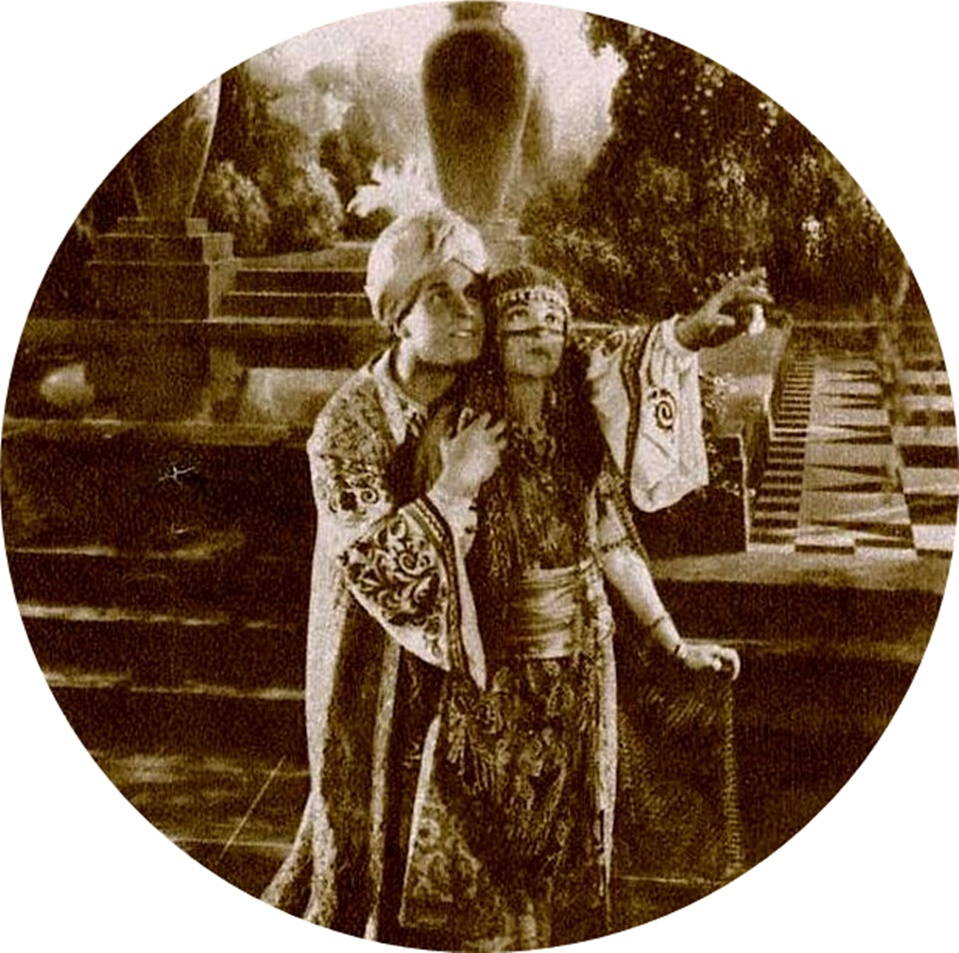
- From a 1922 magazine
- Directed by: Ferdinand P. Earle, jun.
- Written by: Milton Sills
- Based on: Rubaiyat of Omar Khayyam by Omar Khayyam (Edward Fitzgerald translation)
- Produced by: Sol Lesser
- Starring: Ramon Novarro; Kathleen Key
- Cinematography: Georges Benoît
- Edited by: Milton Sills
- Distributed by: Astor Pictures
- Release date: September 29, 1925
- Running time: 60 minutes
- Country: United States
- Language: Silent (English intertitles)

A Lover's Oath is a lost 1925 American silent fantasy film directed by Ferdinand P. Earle, jun. and featuring Ramon Novarro. The film is based upon the Rubaiyat of Omar Khayyam, as translated by Edward Fitzgerald, and included quotes of its text on intertitles. Actor Milton Sills was scenarist and editor for the film.

The film was shot in 1920–21 but not released in America until 1925. Actor Edwin Stevens died in 1923 before the film was released.

Published details of this film resemble those of Omar Khayyam, screened in Australia in 1923 to positive reviews.

== Plot ==
As described in a film magazine review, the son of the chief of one desert tribe, who is betrothed to the daughter of the chief of a neighboring tribe, almost loses the young woman to a riotous rich man who attempts to abduct her. Desperate times for the young couple follow, but in the end they are united and made happy.

== Cast ==
- Ramon Novarro as Ben Ali
- Kathleen Key as Sherin
- Edwin Stevens as Hassan Ben Sabbath
- Frederick Warde as Omar Khayyam
- Hedwiga Reicher as Hassan's Wife
- Snitz Edwards as Omar's Servant
- Charles A. Post as Commander of the Faithful
- Arthur Edmund Carewe as Prince Yussuf
- Paul Weigel as Sheik Rustum
- Philippe De Lacy as His Son
- Warren Rogers as Haja
- Fay Wray appears in an uncredited role; one of her first films

== Production ==
For its 1925 release by Astor Pictures, a small distributor, Milton Sills edited the 1922 film to emphasize the role of Novarro, who by then was a rising star. Novarro refused to cooperate with a request for some new closeups, and reportedly some older clips of Novarro were edited into the film. Despite this, the film was not well received by critics or the public.

== Preservation ==
A Lover's Oath is a lost film save for a short segment (around thirty seconds) held by the Academy Film Archive; the archive preserved the film in 2009. An additional 135-foot section was apparently discovered and uploaded to YouTube.
