= Where's My Wandering Boy Tonight? =

1922 film

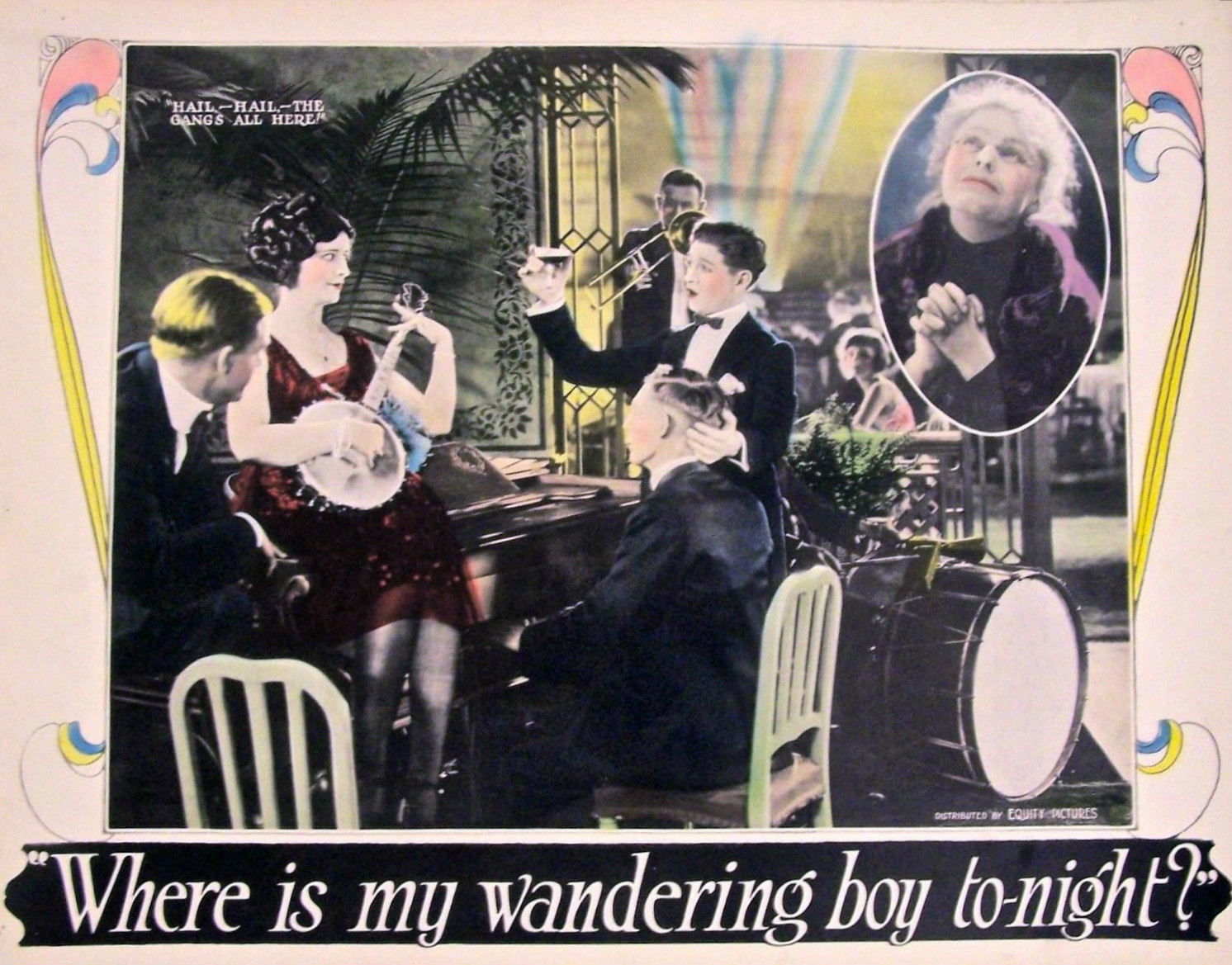
- Lobby card
- Directed by: James P. Hogan; Millard Webb
- Written by: Gerald C. Duffy
- Produced by: B.F. Zeidman
- Cinematography: David Abel
- Production company: B.F. Zeidman Productions Ltd.
- Distributed by: Equity Pictures Corporation
- Release date: February 5, 1922
- Running time: 70 minutes
- Country: United States

Where's My Wandering Boy Tonight? is a 1922 American comedy drama silent black-and-white film directed by James P. Hogan and Millard Webb, written by Gerald C. Duffy and produced by B.F. Zeidman.

== Cast ==
- Cullen Landis as Garry Beecher
- Carl Stockdale as Silas Rudge
- Virginia True Boardman as Martha Beecher
- Patsy Ruth Miller as Lorna Owens
- Kathleen Key as Veronica Tyler
- Ben Deeley as Stewart Kilmer
- Clarence Badger Jr. as R. Sylvester Jones
