= Death Valley Suite =

Short symphonic suite by Ferde Grofé

The Death Valley Suite is a short symphonic suite written by American composer Ferde Grofé in 1949, depicting the westward travels of pioneers through the 'harsh lands' of Death Valley in California. Grofe was commissioned by the Death Valley 49ers, a non profit organization devoted to preserving the pioneering and mining history of the Death Valley region (consisting of Death Valley National Park and surrounding area). The composition and music was part of a pageant celebrating the 100th anniversary of the 49ers who came by way of Death Valley in search of gold and other riches and celebration of the California state centennial (1850–1950).

The original performance was conducted by Grofe with the Hollywood Bowl Symphony on December 3, 1949, in the Desolation Canyon area of Death Valley National Monument (now Death Valley National Park). The music was used in the background as a procession of covered wagons entered the area. Actor James Stewart narrated the pageant celebration. The 1949 pageant was attended by 65,000 people.

The movements are:

1. Funeral Mountains – a strange atonal movement in 5/4 time
2. '49er Emigrant Train – features colorful musical depictions of an Indian attack and a wagon train
3. Desert Water Hole – a medley mixing Oh! Susannah and the main theme of the piece.
4. Sand Storm – another atonal movement featuring a wind machine with a final coda recapitulating the main dramatic theme.

The total length is approximately 17 minutes.
