= Amina Khayyam =

Bangladeshi-born British dancer

- Born: Sylhet Division Bangladesh
- Citizenship: British
- Occupations: Artistic Director, Dancer, choreographer, dance teacher
- Years active: 2001–present
- Children: 1
- Career
- Current group: Amina Khayyam Dance Company
- Dances: Kathak
- Website: aminakhayyamdance.co.uk

Amina Khayyam is a Bangladeshi-born British dancer, choreographer and dance teacher. She is acclaimed for her progressive work within Kathak's intricate and detailed theatrical movements of abhinaya.

== Early life ==
Khayyam was born in Sylhet Division, Bangladesh and comes from a Muslim background where dance was frowned upon. She grew up in village in Oxted, Surrey, where her late father owned a business and Khayyam attended Oxted School.

She trained in London initially with Alpana Sengupta before attending local dance classes under the direction of Kathak specialist, dancer, choreographer and teacher Sushmita Ghosh in 1996, part of which she trained three years at the Bharatiya Vidya Bhavan Educational Trust in London.

== Career ==
In 2001, Khayyam made her professional debut at the Purcell Room, Southbank Centre. Her performance ranges from classical Kathak, in which, she has received high accolades for her Abhinaya, to multi-media performances such as the principal performer in the Akademi/South Bank's outdoor spectacle Escapade in 2003 and in International Arts' and Forum for Laboratory Theatres of Manipuri's production of Macbeth-Stage of Blood on the River Thames. In 2007, she set up her own company, Amina Khayyam Dance Company. Khayyam is the founder and artistic director Amina Khayyam Dance Company, which uses Khathak as the core narrative.

She has toured extensively both nationally and internationally with her own work as well as for other companies such as Sonia Sabri, and has worked with dancers/choreographers including, Kumudini Lakhia, Nahid Siddiqui, Filip Van Huffel, Darshan Singh Bhuller, and Jonathan Lunn. Khayyam uses Kathak as the core of her work; in Laal Shaari, which combined live art process with Kathak movement and she presented at mac, it was selected for ROH2 Firsts. She has also appeared at the mac in Sonia Sabri's Red and zeroculture's production of Find Me Amongst the Black.

In 2014, Khayyam adapted Federico García Lorca's play Yerma, setting it in a modern, inner-city British community to neo-classical Kathak dance and performed to live music with tabla, cello and vocals. Khayyam herself dances the title role. In the same year, she made a full production of A Thousand Faces. She also made a mid scale production Amad.

In 2022, Khayyam's dance company (Amina Khayyam Dance Company) was shortlisted in the 2021 National Dance Awards in the category "Best Independent Company". The following year, the company presented two shows at the Edinburgh Festival Fringe, Bird and You&Me. Bird was presented with a Lustrum Award for an unforgettable festival show by Summerhall.

Khayyam also teaches BA Hons Dance and Culture degree at the University of Surrey.

== Personal life ==
Khayyam has one child (born 2009).

== See also ==
- British Bangladeshi
- List of British Bangladeshis
