= Niagara Falls Suite =

Composition by Ferde Grofé

The Niagara Falls Suite is a musical composition written by Ferde Grofé in 1960, and performed at Niagara Falls in 1961.

== Background ==
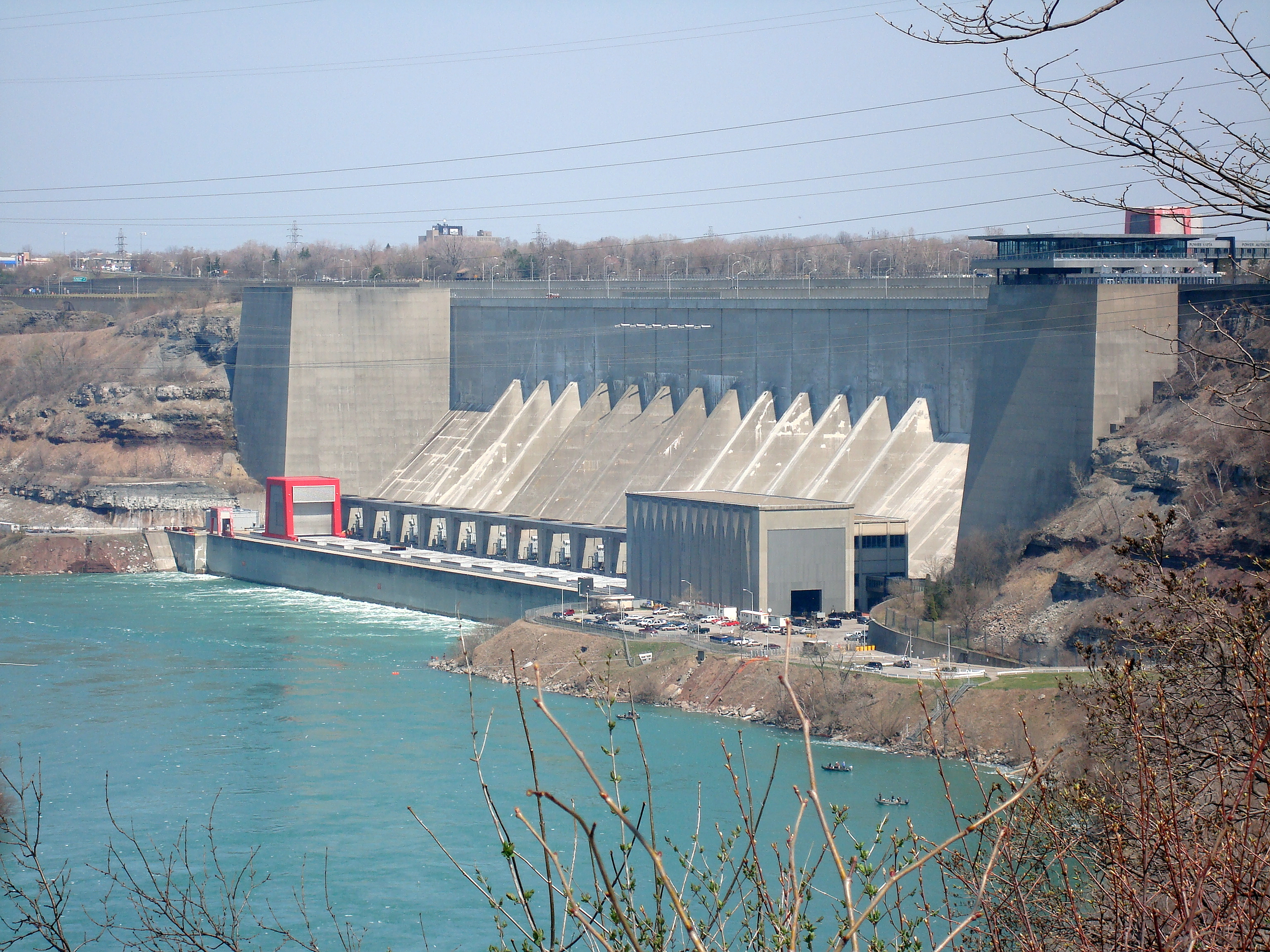
The Robert Moses Niagara Power Plant in 2008

Grofé was commissioned in 1960 by the New York Power Authority to compose a symphonic suite, which would be played to commemorate the opening of the Robert Moses Niagara Power Plant. On 10 February 1961, the plant's opening day, Grofé would perform the suite with the Buffalo Philharmonic Orchestra. The piece is one of Grofé's last orchestral works.

== Movements ==
The composition consists of four movements:

1. Thunder of the Waters
2. Devils' Hole Massacre
3. Honeymooners
4. Power of Niagara
