= Boston String Quartet =

Originally formed in the 19th century, the Boston String Quartet performed its first and second concerts at Association Hall in Boston, Massachusetts. Drawing many of its earliest members from the Boston Symphony Orchestra, the ensemble underwent many transformations up to the present day.

In 2004, violinist Christopher Vuk formed a modern string ensemble bearing the same name. This evolution of the quartet first performed at Carnegie Hall, and later at the Los Angeles Music Awards, Boston Symphony Hall, PBS, and for former president George W. Bush. Known for its contemporary approach, the ensemble blends jazz, rock, blues, ragtime, and classical music styles in its performances.
