= Georges Miquelle =

- Born: 1894; Lille, France
- Died: 1977 (aged 82–83)
- Occupation: Musician
- Instrument: Cello

Georges Miquelle (1894 – 1977) was born in Lille, France. He was a classical cellist in France and the United States.

== Biography ==
He began his studies at the age of five when he entered the Lille Conservatoire. At seven, he took up the cello, studying under Emil Dienne. Before he was 19 he had won two first prizes playing at the Lille Conservatoire and at the Paris Conservatoire.

After a brief but successful period of concertizing in Europe, Miquelle came to America with the French Military Band in May 1918 and toured extensively throughout the United States and Canada. While in Boston he was engaged by the Boston Symphony Orchestra. He left the orchestra in 1920 to devote himself to ensemble playing. In 1920-21 he was cellist with the New York Chamber Music Society. He joined the Boston String Quartet in 1921 and in 1923 toured the country with Dame Nellie Melba and Tito Schipa. Between 1923 and 1954, Miquelle was solo cellist of the Detroit Symphony Orchestra. During this period he gave numerous sonata recitals and chamber music concerts with Ossip Gabrilowitsch, conductor of the Detroit Symphony from 1918 to 1936. He was also a solo cellist with the Chautauqua Summer Symphony for 15 years. He was a member of the artist faculty at the Eastman School of Music from 1954 until 1966.

In 1919 he married Renée Longy, French-American pianist, music theorist, and noted pedagogue who served as a faculty member of the Juilliard School, the Curtis Institute of Music, and the Peabody Conservatory. He later married Emily Derrer Rairdon, former violon-cellist of Toledo Symphony and music instructor at Bowling Green State University and University of Texas Austin.

== Selected discography ==
- Victor Herbert, Cello Concerto No. 2 in E Minor for Cello and Orchestra, Op.30 Howard Hanson conducting the Eastman-Rochester Orchestra. Mercury Living Presence 434355-2
- Ernest Bloch, Schelomo, Hebrew Rhapsody Howard Hanson conducting the Eastman-Rochester Orchestra. Mercury Living Presence 432718–2
