= Alpana Sengupta =

Kathak dancer

- Occupation: Kathak Dancer Choreographer Actress
- Organization: Alpana Sengupta School of Kathak
- Awards: Order of the British Empire 2018

Alpana Sengupta MBE is a Kathak dancer, choreographer, and actress living in Wisbech, Cambridgeshire. She was awarded the MBE (Member of the Order of the British Empire) in the 2018 Queen's Birthday Honours List for her services to South Asian Dance. She is also known for her acting roles in Tales of the Unexpected (1979) and Hotel London (1987).

== Biography ==
Alpana Sengupta is recognised as an exponent of the vivid and mesmerising Kathak style of Indian dance. Her style is predominantly of the Raigarh school of Kathak, noted for her dynamic presentations of the rhythmic aspects of the dance as well as for her mime. Since 1974, together with her husband (sitarist Mick Taylor), Alpana has been a pioneer in raising awareness of Indian dance throughout the UK and the West. She has also performed in British Cinema and Television including Tales of the Unexpected (1979), Asian Magazine (1983) and Hotel London (1987). She was also one of the choreographers in the London East End romance Bollywood Queen (2002).

Alpana continues to perform on stage and tours across England - including one in the presence of Prince Charles. She regularly visits local schools to teach children and runs the Alpana Sengupta School of Kathak to spread the knowledge of her art and culture.

=== Marriage ===
Alpana married Mick Taylor a Sitar maestro of the United Kingdom. They have performed together on several tours. A disciple of Imdad Hussain and Imrat Khan, Cambridgeshire-based Mick Taylor had been suffering from cancer for some years, and died on June 21, 2018, leaving behind his wife Alpana, son Arun, and grandchildren.

== Recognition ==
On June 8, 2018, Alpana Sengupta was named amongst the people across the Anglia region honoured by the Queen in the Birthday Honours list. She was presented the MBE (Member of the Order of the British Empire) in the 2018 Queen's Birthday Honours List for her services to South Asian Dance.

== See also ==
- Kathak
- Indian classical dance
