= Early to Bed (1928 film) =

1928 film

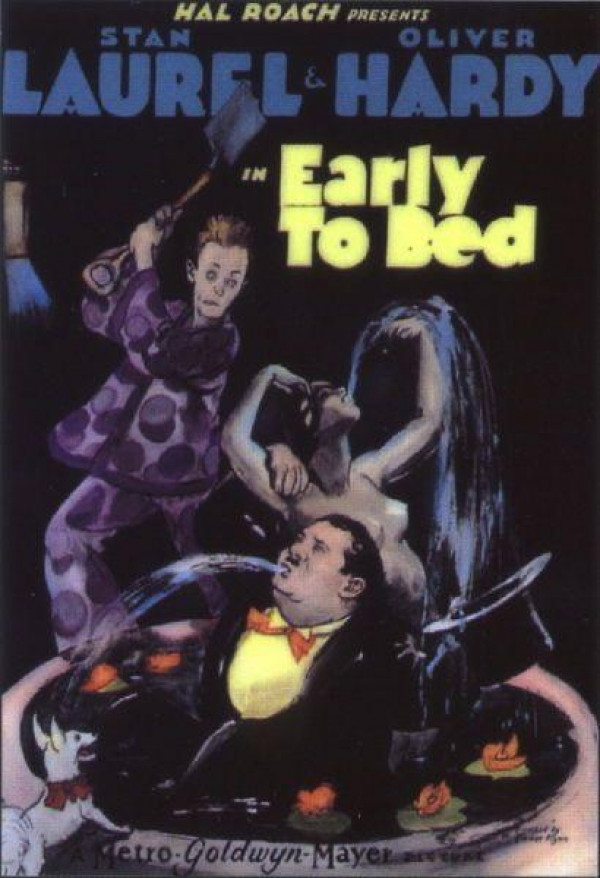
- Directed by: Emmett J. Flynn
- Written by: H.M. Walker
- Produced by: Hal Roach
- Starring: Stan Laurel; Oliver Hardy
- Cinematography: George Stevens
- Edited by: Richard C. Currier
- Music by: Ferde Grofé
- Distributed by: Metro-Goldwyn-Mayer
- Release date: October 6, 1928
- Running time: 19:31
- Country: United States
- Languages: Silent film English (Original intertitles)

Early to Bed is a 1928 silent short subject directed by Emmett J. Flynn starring comedy duo Laurel and Hardy. It was released by Metro-Goldwyn-Mayer on October 6, 1928.

== Plot ==
The duo, initially destitute vagrants, experience a significant shift in fortunes when Ollie inherits a substantial fortune from his deceased uncle. Utilizing his newfound wealth, Ollie purchases an opulent mansion and appoints Stan as his butler. However, following a night of excessive champagne consumption, Ollie returns home with the intent of subjecting Stan to a series of malicious pranks. In response, Stan reacts by wreaking havoc throughout the mansion, resulting in extensive damage to the property. Attempting to escape Stan's wrath, Hardy submerges himself in a large fountain that contains many sculpted cherub heads carved in his own image. He takes the place of one of the heads but is supposed to be continually spouting water;and even Stan catches on when Ollie runs dry numerous times. But by then, Stan finds it funny enough that he forgives his pal.

== Cast ==
- Stan Laurel - The Butler
- Oliver Hardy - The Master
- Buster - house dog
