= Ferdinand P. Earle =

American general (1839–1903)

Ferdinand Pinney Earle
- Born: 1839; Hartford, Connecticut, U.S.
- Died: January 2, 1903
- Military career
- Allegiance: United States
- Branch: New York National Guard
- Service years: 1862–1869; 1881–1890s
- Rank: Brigadier General (Chief of Artillery)
- Units: Seventh Regiment, New York National Guard; Second Battery, N.G.N.Y. ("Earle's Battery")
- Awards: Order of the Bust of the Liberator (Venezuela)
- Other work: Hotel proprietor, military officer

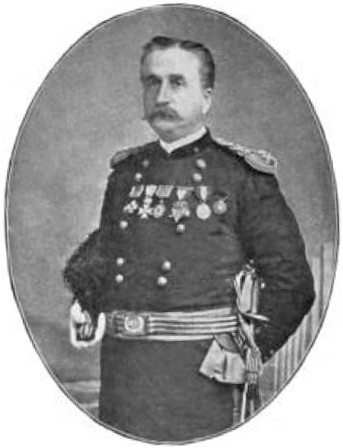
Gen. Ferdinand P. Earle

Ferdinand Pinney Earle (1839 – January 2, 1903) was a US military officer and hotel proprietor.

== Early life and family ==
Earle was born in Hartford, Connecticut in 1839. His mother was Elizabeth (née Pinney), daughter of Judge Benjamin Pinney, of Ellington, Connecticut. His father, William Pitt Earle, was for many years a leading hotel proprietor in New York City, and at the time of his death, was one of the oldest men in that line of business. He was for many years proprietor of the Clinton House, of Hartford and later of the Lorillard House, New York, which was subsequently known and achieved a national reputation as Earle's Hotel.

== Hotel proprietor ==
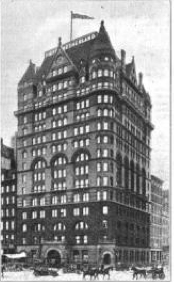
Hotel Netherland

After Earle completed his education, he came to New York and soon associated himself with his father, who had been proprietor of the Clinton House in Hartford, but had moved to New York and was then the proprietor of Earle's Hotel at Centre and Canal Streets, and in the course of a few years he succeeded his father as proprietor of this property. Afterward he established the Hotel Normandie at Broadway and 38th Street, and Normandie-by-the-Sea, a large summer hotel at Sea Bright, New Jersey. For a short time he was also manager of the Hotel Netherland, which was built for Earle by William Waldorf Astor.

== Military career ==
Earle was a prominent figure in the National Army and in the Grand Army of the Republic. His military career began Oct. 3, 1862, when he entered as private in Company B of the Seventh Regiment, N. Y., and was honorably discharged Oct. 29, 1869. In 1881, he re-entered military life as Captain of the Second Battery, N. G. N. Y., and became noted as one of the most efficient officers in the National Guard. The battery which he commanded was thereafter known as "Earle's Battery." Gen. Earle received his military title in 1889, when he was appointed Chief of Artillery with the rank of Brigadier-General on the staff of Governor Hill, with whom he was always on friendly terms, and he was re-appointed by Governor Flower. For ten years after his reentrance into military life he was chairman of the Auxiliary Committee of the Grand Army of the Republic. In 1884, he was decorated by the Venezuelan Government with the Order of the Bust of the Liberator in recognition of his services to that government.

== Society involvement ==
He was for many years chairman and treasurer of the Citizens' Auxiliary Committee of the G. A. R. His charitable and benevolent operations were well known, and the "Earle Guild," founded by him for the relief of the needy, accomplished much good in this direction. Earle was connected with many of the leading societies and organizations of the city. He was a member of the New York Chamber of Commerce, the New York Historical Society, New York Genealogical and Biographical Society, Huguenot Society of America, New England Society, National Rifle Association of America, Seventh Regiment Club, American Yacht Club, Order of the Founders and Patriots of America, Society of Colonial Wars, and Society of the War of 1812.

== Later years ==
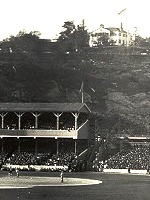
Jumel Mansion (1905)

After the termination of long litigation over the Jumel estate, Earle was able to purchase the historic "Jumel Mansion", famous as the place where George Washington made his headquarters during the Battle of Harlem Heights, in September 1776. It is also where former Vice President Aaron Burr lived for several months in 1833, during his brief marriage to its owner, widow Eliza Jumel. Here in this house, at 160th Street, near 10th Avenue, New York City, built by a relative of Earle's ancestor, Capt. William Morris, Earle spent his retirement the last years of his life. He had this building fitted up and restored as far as possible to its original condition and gave it the name of "Earle Cliff." Here, his wife, a Regent of the Washington Heights Chapter, Daughters of the American Revolution, entertained the Daughters and other patriotic societies. She was the founder and president of the Washington Heights Society, Children of the American Revolution.

== Personal life ==
Earle (1839–1903) was twice married: first, to Mary Lay Hutchings; secondly, in 1871, to Lydia Jones Tuttle, widow of Doriphus Tuttle of Boston, Massachusetts. There were four surviving sons by his second marriage: Ferdinand Pinney, Victor de La Montagne, William Pitt Striker, and Guyon Locke Crocheron.

Ferdinand P. Earle, Jr. (1871–1951) married Mlle Fischbacher of Paris, who claimed descent from Charlemagne. The wealthy artist-poet then met a Miss Julie Kuttner, and persuaded the first to return to Paris with their son for a divorce so he could marry his "preordained affinity". His neighbors in Monroe, New York were livid, as they had taken the first into their hearts. He turned his attention to moving pictures, first supplying artistic intertitles for the film Toys of Fate as Metro's art director, then adopted novel double-exposure techniques, anticipating chroma key, to produce his film Omar Khayyam in 1921.
