= Irish Hearts (1927 film) =

1927 film directed by Byron Haskin

- Directed by: Byron Haskin
- Screenplay by: C. Graham Baker; Bess Meredyth
- Story by: Darryl F. Zanuck
- Starring: May McAvoy; Jason Robards Sr. Warner Richmond; Kathleen Key; Walter Perry; Walter Rodgers
- Cinematography: Virgil Miller
- Production company: Warner Bros.
- Distributed by: Warner Bros.
- Release date: May 21, 1927
- Running time: 60 minutes
- Country: United States
- Language: English

Irish Hearts is a 1927 American comedy film directed by Byron Haskin and written by C. Graham Baker and Bess Meredyth. The film stars May McAvoy, Jason Robards Sr., Warner Richmond, Kathleen Key, Walter Perry and Walter Rodgers. The film was released by Warner Bros. on May 21, 1927.

== Cast ==
- May McAvoy as Sheila
- Jason Robards Sr. as Rory
- Warner Richmond as Emmett
- Kathleen Key as Clarice
- Walter Perry as Sheila's Father
- Walter Rodgers as Restaurant Proprietor
- Les Bates as Taxi Driver
