= The Highbinders =

1915 film

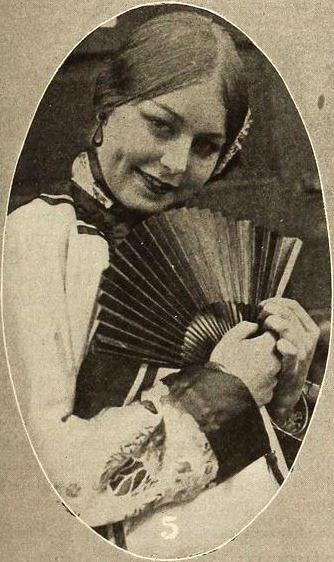
- Seena Owen as Ah Woo
- Directed by: Tod Browning
- Starring: Eugene Pallette; Seena Owen
- Production company: Majestic Film
- Distributed by: Mutual Film
- Release date: April 18, 1915
- Running time: 2 reels
- Country: United States
- Language: Silent with English intertitles

The Highbinders is a 1915 American silent short crime film directed by Tod Browning. It is not known whether the film currently survives.

== Plot ==
As recorded in a film magazine, Maggie, the daughter of Pat Gallagher, a brutal saloon keeper, to escape from being forced into a marriage with a bully and protégé of her father, takes refuge in a shop in Chinatown that is just around the corner from her father's resort. The Chinese merchant Hop Woo, who has given her shelter, at last persuades her to marry him, resulting in a repugnant life for her. Years later finds Hop Woo the merchant selling his daughter Ah Woo into slavery. Ah Woo's brother, overhearing his father bartering with the highbinder, who is a member of the powerful Hip-y-tong society, runs for help to Jack Donovan, who keeps a gambling hall on the border of Chinatown. The brother shoots and kills the slave trader. Hop Woo is suspected of the crime and visited with blood atonement by the Hip-y-tong. The brother and Donovan, who loves the Chinese-American girl, rescue her from an underground passage below Chinatown, and Donovan shoots dead the highbinders. Maggie, the mother has committed suicide. Donovan sells the gambling hall and buys a ranch, where he takes his bride Ah Woo and her brother.

== Cast ==
- Eugene Pallette as Hop Woo
- Seena Owen as Ah Woo (as Signe Auen)
- Billie West as Maggie Gallagher
- Walter Long as Pat Gallagher
- Tom Wilson as Jack Donovan

== See also ==
- Hip Sing Association
