= Emmett J. Flynn =

American film director (1891–1937)

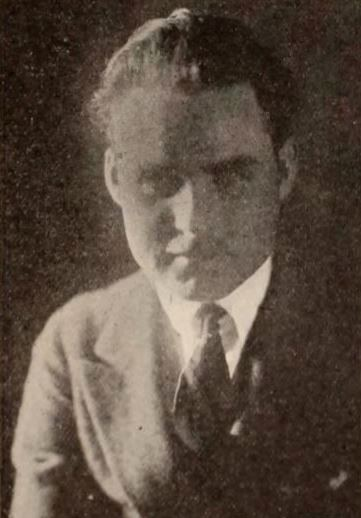
- Flynn in the Motion Picture Herald, 1919
- Born: Emmett John Flynn; 1882; Denver, Colorado, U.S.
- Died: June 4, 1937 (aged 54–55); Hollywood, California, U.S.
- Education: Sacred Heart College
- Spouse(s): Genevieve (m. 1914; div. 1930) Nita Baker (m. 1933) Margaret Shelby (m. 1937; ann. 1937)
- Children: 1

Emmett John Flynn (1882 – June 4, 1937) was an American director, screenwriter, actor, and producer.

== Early life ==
Emmett John Flynn was born in Denver, Colorado, in 1882. He graduated from Sacred Heart College of Denver.

== Career ==
In 1907, Flynn came to Hollywood. He had a short stage career.

Flynn was assistant director to Mary Pickford. He directed Rudolph Valentino and Norman Kerry.

== Personal life ==
Flynn lived on Carlton Way in Los Angeles. Flynn married Genevieve in 1914. They had a daughter Mary Gene. They divorced in 1930. He was arrested on May 7, 1930, on suspicion of driving while intoxicated. On March 16, 1932, he was imprisoned for failure to pay child support. In June 1932, he was sentenced to a road camp for excessive drinking while on probation.

Flynn was sentenced to 150 days in prison at Riverside Jail for drunkenness. He escaped jail on November 10, 1933. He married Nita Baker, a nurse, on December 20, 1933, in Miami, Florida. He was arrested a few hours after his wedding on a fugitive warrant from Riverside. For leaving Riverside early, he was subsequently sentenced to five years at San Quentin Prison. He served one year of that term.

Flynn married Margaret Shelby, sister of actress Mary Miles Minter, of Laguna Beach on March 16, 1937, in Yuma, Arizona. They were arrested in Glendale a few days later on March 19 for drunkenness. Within a couple weeks, his new wife filed for annulment citing he was still married to his second wife. The annulment was granted in April 1937. He was arrested again for drunkenness on May 4, 1937, in Beverly Hills.

Flynn was found unconscious in his apartment by his landlady on June 4, 1937. According to the paper, he had reportedly fallen and an officer relayed he had been taking "sleeping potions". He died later that day at the Hollywood Receiving Hospital. His death was later attributed to alcoholism.

== Filmography ==
=== As director ===
- 1917 : Alimony
- 1918 : The Racing Strain
- 1919 : Eastward Ho!
- 1919 : The Bondage of Barbara
- 1919 : Virtuous Sinners
- 1919 : A Bachelor's Wife
- 1919 : Yvonne from Paris
- 1919 : The Lincoln Highwayman
- 1920 : The Valley of Tomorrow
- 1920 : Shod with Fire
- 1920 : Leave It to Me
- 1920 : The Untamed
- 1920 : The Man Who Dared
- 1921 : A Connecticut Yankee in King Arthur's Court
- 1921 : Shame
- 1921 : The Last Trail
- 1922 : A Fool There Was
- 1922 : Monte Cristo
- 1922 : Without Compromise
- 1923 : Hell's Hole
- 1923 : In the Palace of the King
- 1924 : Nellie, the Beautiful Cloak Model
- 1924 : The Man Who Came Back
- 1924 : Gerald Cranston's Lady
- 1925 : The Dancers
- 1925 : Wings of Youth
- 1925 : East Lynne
- 1926 : The Yankee Señor
- 1926 : The Palace of Pleasure
- 1926 : Yellow Fingers
- 1927 : Married Alive
- 1928 : Early to Bed
- 1929 : The Veiled Woman
- 1929 : Hold Your Man
- 1929 : The Shannons of Broadway

=== As writer ===
- 1915 : Big Jim's Heart
- 1919 : The Lincoln Highwayman
- 1925 : East Lynne

=== As actor ===
- 1914 : The Pursuit of the Phantom : le fils de Van Zandt

=== As producer ===
- 1924 : The Man Who Came Back
