= Kathleen Key =

American actress

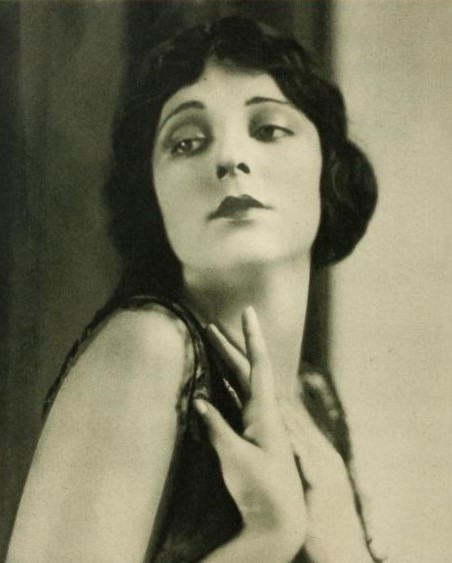
- From Stars of the Photoplay, 1924
- Born: Kitty Lanahan; April 1, 1903; Buffalo, New York, U.S.
- Died: December 22, 1954 (aged 51); Woodland Hills, Los Angeles, California, U.S.
- Resting place: Valhalla Memorial Park Cemetery
- Other names: Kathleen Keys; Ethel Payton
- Occupation: Actress
- Years active: 1920–1936

Kathleen Key (born Kitty Lanahan; April 1, 1903 – December 22, 1954) was an American actress who achieved a brief period of fame during the silent era. She is best remembered for playing Tirzah in the 1925 film Ben-Hur.

== Early life and career ==
Born in Buffalo, New York, Key moved with her family to an isolated ranch between Los Angeles and San Francisco while still an infant. Her family moved permanently to Los Angeles when she was nine. With a talent for sketching, her initial ambition was to be a commercial artist, but, as a teenager, she soon found employment playing small parts at nearby film studios.

She was hired by Snowy Baker Productions around this time and spent a year in Australia, where she appeared in eight films, including the 1920 The Jackeroo of Coolabong, in which she made her starring debut. From her return to the U.S. to the end of the 1920s, Kathleen Key, sometimes credited as Kathleen Keys, starred in several more films, but never reached A-level stardom.

Charles Donald Fox's 1925 encyclopedia of film stars, Famous Film Folk summarizes her early career and reports that "Her chief off-screen diversions are riding and dancing, in both of which she excells. She is 5 feet 3 inches tall, weighs 118 ibs., and has dark hair and brown eyes."

In 1922, she was featured in Omar Khayyam (which was not released until 1925 as A Lover's Oath) and played a vamp in Where's My Wandering Boy Tonight? The same year she signed to play with Charles Buck Jones in Vamoos for Fox Film.

Prior to making Vamoos, Kathleen starred with John Gilbert in St. Elmo, also for Fox studios. She was cast as an "innocent young thing" rather than playing her usual vamp role.

An early career highpoint was her selection as one of the 1923 WAMPAS Baby Stars; however, by the end of the decade Key had her last significant film role, as Colette in 1929's The Phantom of the North. Her name does not appear in the credits of her four final films: as Rosalie Lawrence in Sweeping Against the Winds (1930), as an unnamed Guest in Thunder in the Night (1935), and in 1936, as a Dance Hall Girl in Klondike Annie, and finally, a bit part in One Rainy Afternoon. After these last, tiny roles, Key apparently retired from film altogether.

== Personal life ==
In the early 1930s, Key had a well-known love affair with silent-film actor Buster Keaton, who was married at the time. As told in Marion Meade's biography of Keaton, the actor attempted to call off the relationship, but Key flew into a jealous rage and ransacked his MGM dressing room, which caused her to be virtually blacklisted afterward by the movie industry. Sidney Skolsky, a Daily News columnist, sent Keaton a joking telegram, reading: "Congratulations. Hear you are off Key." It was also reported that the dressing-room fracas was sparked by Keaton refusing to give Key a monetary loan.

== Death ==
On December 22, 1954, Key died from cirrhosis of the liver. She was buried at Valhalla Memorial Park in North Hollywood, California.

== Filmography ==
Year	Title	Role	Notes
1920	The Jackeroo of Coolabong	Edith MacDonald	Lost film
1920	The Rookie's Return	Gloria	
1921	The Four Horsemen of the Apocalypse	Georgette	Uncredited
1921	The Fighting Breed	Enid MacDonald	Lost film
1922	Where's My Wandering Boy Tonight?	Veronica Tyler	Lost film
1922	West of Chicago	Señoria Gonzales	Lost film
1922	Bells of San Juan	Florrie Engel	Lost film
1922	The Beautiful and Damned	Rachel	Lost film
1923	Hell's Hole	Mabel Grant	Lost film
1923	The Rendezvous	Varvara	
1923	North of Hudson Bay	Estelle McDonald	Alternative title: North of the Yukon; Incomplete film
1923	Reno	Yvette, the governess	
1923	The Man from Brodney's	Neenah	Incomplete film
1924	The Trouble Shooter	Nancy Brewster	
1924	The Sea Hawk	Andalusian Slave Girl	
1924	Revelation	Madonna	Lost film
1925	A Lover's Oath	Sherin	Lost film
1925	The Big Parade	Miss Apperson	Uncredited
1925	Ben Hur	Tirzah	Alternative title: Ben-Hur: A Tale of the Christ
1926	Under Western Skies	Milly Leewis	Lost film
1926	The Flaming Frontier	Lucretia	Incomplete film
1926	Money Talks	Vamp	Incomplete film
1926	College Days	Louise	Lost film
1926	The Desert's Toll	Muriel Cooper	
1927	Hey! Hey! Cowboy	Emily Decker	Lost film
1927	Irish Hearts	Clarice	Lost film
1928	Golf Widows	Ethel Dixon	
1929	The Family Picnic	Cleo of Paris	Lost film
1929	The Phantom of the North	Colette	Alternative title: Phantoms of the North; Lost film
1930	Sweeping Against the Winds	Rosalie Lawrence	Lost film
1935	Thunder in the Night	Guest	Uncredited
1936	Klondike Annie	Dance Hall Girl	Uncredited
1936	One Rainy Afternoon	Bit Role	Uncredited; Alternative title: Matinee Scandal (final film role)
