= Omar Khayam (drug dealer) =

British Muslim and convicted drug dealer (born 1983)

- Born: 1983 (age 42–43); Bedford, England
- Other name: Skinner
- Known for: February 2006 protest in London against the Muhammad cartoons

Omar Khayam (born 1983) is a British Muslim and convicted drug dealer who achieved a considerable degree of notoriety following a February 2006 protest in London against the Muhammad cartoons; at the protest, he dressed like a suicide bomber.

== Early life ==
Khayam was brought up in the Bedford area of Bedfordshire of Pakistani descent. His parents belongs from Punjab, Pakistan. The area has a "growing" drugs and gangs problem and when Khayam was 16 he was charged with throwing 2oz bag of crack cocaine from a car window to try to avoid detection from the pursuing police. He got eight years in 2002 for possession of a class A drug with intent to supply and a fine for having a small amount of heroin, but his sentence was cut to five-and-a-half years on appeal. He was released on parole in 2005, having served half of his sentence.

According to a report in the Daily Mirror, he had been a significant local drug dealer in Bedford, known on the street as Skinner. The report stated that he became increasingly radicalised in prison, mixing with extremist Islamists, and promising to sell drugs to aid their cause.

== Protest ==
In 2006 the Danish Muhammad cartoons were republished in many newspapers across Europe. Of them, Khayam said "I found the pictures deeply offensive as a Muslim and I felt the Danish newspaper had been provocative and controversial, deeply offensive and insensitive."

In response, at a protest over their publication, Khayam dressed in the style of a suicide bomber. When newspapers traced his whereabouts, he initially refused to apologise, saying his protest was justifiable. However, he later appeared publicly alongside his local Labour MP of the time Patrick Hall to apologise, declaring his actions "wrong, unjustified and insensitive", adding "by me dressing the way I did, I did just that, exactly the same as the Danish newspaper, if not worse. My method of protest has offended many people, especially the families of the victims of the July bombings. This was not my intention." Hall said "He acted on impulse - couple of friends, they got on the train and got to London, and I believe this was an impulsive, foolish reaction to what he saw was the offence of the publication of those cartoons."

=== Arrest ===
On 7 February 2006, following heavy publicity, he was arrested by Bedfordshire Police and returned to prison for unspecified parole violations. His arrest for parole violation was at the direct request of the Home Office in the wake of these news reports, although it is not known if it was directly related to his protest activity. Following his release, more controversy followed Omar Khayam after his appointment as a train cleaner for First Capital Connect in Cambridge, UK.

== See also ==
- UK Islamist demonstration outside Danish Embassy
