= Omar Khayyam Square =

Monument

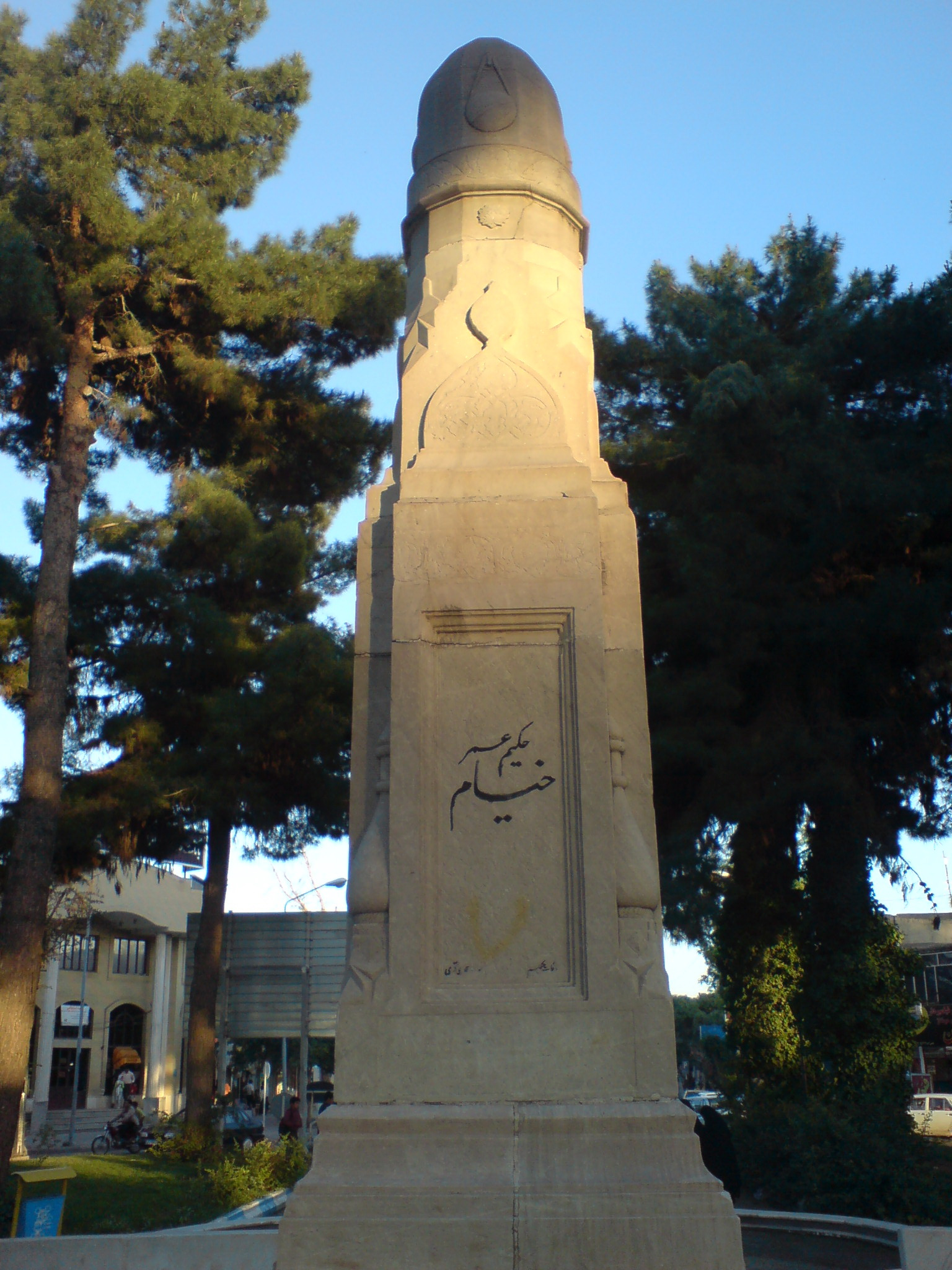
- Monument of the previous tomb of Khayyam
- Interactive map of Omar Khayyam Square
- Native name: میدان خیام (Persian)
- Type: City square and monument
- Location: Nishapur, Iran

Omar Khayyam Square is a city square named after Omar Khayyam in Nishapur, Iran. A monument from the Mausoleum of Omar Khayyam was moved here in the 20th century.
