= The Scarab Murder Case (film) =

1936 film by Michael Hankinson

- Wally Patch (left) and Wilfrid Hyde-White (right) in the film
- Directed by: Michael Hankinson
- Written by: Selwyn Jepson
- Based on: novel The Scarab Murder Case; 1930 novel by S. S. Van Dine
- Produced by: Anthony Havelock-Allan
- Starring: Wilfrid Hyde-White; Wally Patch; Kathleen Kelly
- Cinematography: Claude Friese-Greene; Ronald Neame
- Production companies: British & Dominions Film Corporation; Paramount British Pictures
- Release date: 27 November 1936
- Running time: 68 minutes
- Country: United Kingdom
- Language: English

The Scarab Murder Case (also known as Scarlet Murder Mystery) is a lost 1936 British film directed by Michael Hankinson and starring Wilfrid Hyde-White, Wally Patch and Kathleen Kelly. It was written by Selwyn Jepson based on the 1930 novel of the same title by S. S. Van Dine. It is part of a series of films about fictional detective Philo Vance.

== Plot ==
A murder of a millionaire in a private museum implicates eminent Egyptologist Dr. Bliss. While Scotland Yard is eager to make an arrest, American sleuth Philo Vance intervenes, preventing the police from taking the doctor into custody. As the investigation deepens, suspicion falls on Mr. Salveter, whose secret affection for Bliss's wife provides a motive. Vance identifies Bliss as the killer after all.

== Cast ==
- Wilfrid Hyde-White as Philo Vance
- Wally Patch as Inspector Moor
- Kathleen Kelly as Angela Hargreaves
- Henri De Vries as Dr. Bliss
- John Robinson as Donald Scarlett
- Wallace Geoffrey as Salveter
- Stella Moya as Meryt Amen
- Graham Cheswright as Makeham

== Production ==
Paramount Pictures intended for William Powell to portray Philo Vance, as he had in three prior Paramount films The Canary Murder Case (1929), The Greene Murder Case (1929) and The Benson Murder Case (1930), as well as The Kennel Murder Case (1933) for Warner Bros. However, Powell changed studios, and the role went to Wilfrid Hyde-White.

== Reception ==
Film Weekly wrote: "British attempt to produces a Philo Vance story. It compares unfavourably with previous Vance films made in Hollywood. Badly over-laden with dialogue it becomes tedious in spite of a neat story. ... Wilfred Hyde White gives a smooth, competent performance in the role, but he has not the suave sophistication that such actors as William Powell put into the part. ... Acting is quite competent, and the story is sufficiently strong to make the picture moderately entertaining in an unpretentious way."

Kine Weekly wrote: "This picture makes the fundamental mistake of permitting action to play second fiddle to dialogue. For the first half an hour or so it holds and interests, because the story certainly has ingenuity, but after that the incessant talk becomes tedious and takes the edge off intended thrills. ... The snag in this picture is the director's inability to get a move on. The deductions and twists are fashiored by an ingenious pen, but the very fact that they are described verbally rather than acted in the general sense limits the entertainment's punch. The unexpected happens, but only with a casualness that leaves one cold."

The Daily Film Renter wrote: "Put over mainly in terms of dialogue, plot nevertheless holds attention, neat denouement revealing killer as original suspect! ... W. Hyde-White acts well, but seems miscast in lead, sterling support coming from Wally Patch as boneheaded Yard inspector. ... Agreeable supporting feature of type."

Picturegoer wrote: "Too much dialogue and not enough action renders this rather a dull essay into the realms of detection. The plot has ingenuity, but too much talk makes it tedious and inclines to minimise the effect of the thrills. However, it provides fair entertainment of its type, and W. Hyde-White acts well as the subtle Philo Vance."

== Lost film ==
The British Film Institute has classed The Scarab Murder Case as a lost film, included in its "75 Most Wanted" list. The BFI National Archive holds a pressbook, but no stills, film or video materials.
