= The Dragon Murder Case (film) =

1934 film directed by H. Bruce Humberstone

- Directed by: H. Bruce Humberstone
- Written by: Rian James (adaptation)
- Screenplay by: F. Hugh Herbert; Robert N. Lee
- Based on: the 1933 novel The Dragon Murder Case by S. S. Van Dine
- Starring: Warren William; Margaret Lindsay; Lyle Talbot; Eugene Pallette
- Cinematography: Tony Gaudio
- Edited by: Terry Morse
- Music by: Bernhard Kaun
- Production company: First National Pictures
- Distributed by: Warner Bros. Pictures
- Release date: August 25, 1934
- Running time: 65 or 67-68 minutes
- Country: United States
- Language: English

The Dragon Murder Case is a 1934 mystery film adaptation of the novel of the same name by S. S. Van Dine, starring Warren William as private detective Philo Vance, Margaret Lindsay, Lyle Talbot and Eugene Pallette, and featuring Helen Lowell, Robert McWade, Robert Barrat, Dorothy Tree, George E. Stone and Etienne Girardot.

== Plot ==
Monty Montague disappears after diving into a natural pool of water on an estate. Several people dive in, but there is no trace of him. Philo Vance and the District Attorney come to investigate and decide to drain the pool. They are told that there are potholes near the pool, and Montague's body is found at the bottom of a very deep pothole. His body has claw marks on it, consistent with the superstition that a dragon inhabits the pool.

== Cast ==
- Warren William as Philo Vance
- Margaret Lindsay as Bernice
- Lyle Talbot as Leland
- Eugene Pallette as Sgt. Heath
- Helen Lowell as Mrs. Stamm
- Robert McWade as Markham
- Robert Barrat as Stamm
- Dorothy Tree as Ruby
- George E. Stone as Tatum
- Etienne Girardot as Dr. Doremus
- George Meeker as Monty Montague
- Robert Warwick as Dr. Halliday
- William B. Davidson as Greeff
- Arthur Aylesworth as Trainor
- Charles C. Wilson as Det. Hennessey

== Production ==
Principal photography took place from May 11, 1934, to mid-June.

The Dragon Murder Case was the first Philo Vance film to star Warren William as Vance; the character had previously been played by Basil Rathbone and William Powell. William would play the character only once more, in The Gracie Allen Murder Case.

H. Bruce Humberstone was not the first director considered for the film. It was offered to Michael Curtiz, Archie Mayo, Mervyn Le Roy and Alfred Green, all of whom turned it down.

== Reception ==
In his review in The New York Times, Mordaunt Hall found that the "denouement is scarcely satisfactory, for it is not quite clear how Mr. Vance reaches his conclusions." Also, in his opinion, "Mr. William, while he does fair work, is not as easy and smooth in the rôle as was Mr. [William] Powell."
