= The Bishop Murder Case (film) =

1929 film

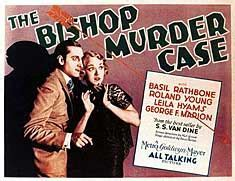
- Original theatrical poster.
- Directed by: David Burton; Nick Grinde
- Screenplay by: Lenore J. Coffee
- Based on: The Bishop Murder Case; 1929 novel by S. S. Van Dine
- Starring: Basil Rathbone; Leila Hyams; Roland Young
- Cinematography: Roy F. Overbaugh
- Edited by: William LeVanway
- Music by: William Axt
- Distributed by: Metro-Goldwyn-Mayer
- Release date: December 31, 1929
- Running time: 88 minutes
- Country: United States
- Language: English

The Bishop Murder Case is a 1929 American pre-Code mystery film directed by David Burton (credited for stage direction) and Nick Grinde (credited for screen direction) and starring Basil Rathbone, Leila Hyams and Roland Young. Ten years before assuming his role as Sherlock Holmes in a series of 14 films, Rathbone essayed the character of S.S. Van Dine's detective Philo Vance in this single outing.

== Plot ==
The Bishop Murder Case (1929)

From his private balcony, elderly Prof. Dillard and his servant see the body of family friend Joseph Robin with an arrow in his chest. Dillard calls district attorney Markham, who brings in private detective Philo Vance and lazy police detective Heath. Vance quickly deduces that the arrow scene was staged (Robin was actually bludgeoned inside the house), but there is no obvious suspect.

Living with Dillard is his niece Belle; Dillard's adopted son, Sigurd Arnesson, who is also Belle's boyfriend, returns from college on hearing of the crime. In the next house are the Drukkers, a brother and sister: she feels responsible for a serious injury he still suffers from, and is now frail and agoraphobic. She could have seen the body from her window, and Mr. Drukker says he heard her screaming in her room; she fearfully says she saw nothing and did not scream. Drukker admits to being in Dillard's house before the murder. Another neighbor is John Pardee, a chess enthusiast, who seems overly interested in the case.

A taunting typewritten note is found, signed "the Bishop". It alludes to the nursery rhyme "Cock Robin". That was Robin's nickname, and another visitor at the house that day was named Sperling—German for "Sparrow"—but he proves to have a solid alibi. Neither Drukker's nor Arnesson's typewriter matches the note, and Dillard does not have one.

Later a friend of Arnesson's, named John, is found murdered. He was shot in the top of the head, an allusion to Jack's injury in "Jack and Jill". Then Drukker, sitting on a low wall in a park at night, is pulled off the wall and murdered: like "Humpty Dumpty", says a note from "the Bishop". Drukker's sister is found dead also, perhaps from fright, with a chess bishop in her hand; a valuable notebook about Drukker's research work is missing from their home.

Heath and Markham become suspicious of Pardee, but find him dead, along with a house of cards (obviously built after he died) with a chess bishop on top: "This Is the House That Jack Built".

Later, Dillard expresses some misgivings about Arnesson, and mentions the Henrik Ibsen play The Pretenders, which Arnesson is fond of.

That night, after Belle says goodnight to Arnesson, she makes her way into the attic and finds the typewriter that "the Bishop" used for his notes. At this point she is jumped from behind.

Mulling over Dillard's words later that night, Vance suddenly realizes that one of the characters in The Pretenders is a bishop—named Arnesson. He rushes back to Dillard's house together with Markham, Heath, and more police. Arnesson's window is open and neither he nor Belle is in their room. Dillard joins the group to search the house. Breaking down the locked door to the attic, they find the typewriter, but not Belle, who is bound and gagged in a nearby cupola.

Downstairs, they are talking to Dillard when Arnesson returns. When Vance accuses him, he acts guilty. Meanwhile, Dillard surreptitiously pours some powder from a poison ring into a wine glass. As things calm down and Arnesson is about to be arrested, Dillard pours wine for Arnesson and himself; but Vance announces that he has switched the glasses.

Dillard is the murderer, and was trying to fake Arnesson's suicide. He was jealous and wanted to be Belle's only friend. He originally only intended to kill Robin and frame Arnesson, but developed the more elaborate scheme when he realized Miss Drukker must have witnessed his actions. Arnesson acted guilty because Vance asked him to. And Belle is fine; after Dillard left the attic, Vance had asked Heath to search the cupola.

Arnesson and Belle embrace. Vance stops Heath from carelessly drinking the poison.

== Cast ==
- Basil Rathbone as Philo Vance
- Leila Hyams as Belle Dillard
- Roland Young as Sigurd Arnesson
- Alec B. Francis as Professor Bertrand Dillard
- George F. Marion as Adolph Drukker
- Zelda Sears as Miss Drukker (shown as "Mrs. Otto Drukker" in the screen credits)
- Bodil Rosing as Grete Menzel
- Carroll Nye as John E. Sprigg
- Charles Quatermaine as John Pardee
- James Donlan as Sgt. Ernest Heath
- Sidney Bracey as Robin Pyne
- Clarence Geldart as D.A. John F.X. Markham
- Delmer Daves as Raymond Sperling
- Nellie Bly Baker as Beedle

== See also ==
- List of early sound feature films (1926–1929)
