= The Bishop Murder Case =

1929 novel by S.S. Van Dine

- First US edition dust jacket
- Author: S. S. Van Dine
- Language: English
- Series: Philo Vance
- Genre: Mystery
- Publisher: Scribners Press
- Publication date: 1929
- Publication place: United States
- Media type: Print (hardback & paperback)
- Preceded by: The Greene Murder Case
- Followed by: The Scarab Murder Case

The Bishop Murder Case (1929) is the fourth in a series of mystery novels by S. S. Van Dine about fictional detective Philo Vance. The detective solves a mystery built around a nursery rhyme. The Bishop Murder Case is believed to be the first nursery-rhyme mystery book.

== Plot summary ==
The story involves a series of murders taking place in a wealthy neighborhood of New York City. The first murder, of a Mr. Joseph Cochrane Robin, who is found pierced by an arrow, is accompanied by a note signed "The Bishop", with an extract from the nursery rhyme, "Who Killed Cock Robin". This crime takes place at the home of an elderly physicist with a beautiful young ward and a private archery range. District Attorney Markham finds the circumstances so unusual that he asks his friend Philo Vance to advise upon the psychological aspects of the crime. Further murders connected with the physicist's family and neighbours are accompanied with similar extracts from Mother Goose, such as the case of Johnny Sprigg, "who was shot through the middle of his wig, wig, wig." Midway through the book, an elderly woman confesses to the crimes, but this possibility is discounted by the police for physical reasons and by Philo Vance for psychological ones. Vance and the police luckily discover the kidnapping and confinement of a little Miss Moffatt before the child suffocates in the closet in which she has been locked. Vance finally realizes the significance of one character's pointed reference to The Pretenders, a play written by Henrik Ibsen. Vance arranges a spectacular finale in which the criminal is poisoned by a glass of liqueur which that person prepared for another suspect.

== Literary significance and criticism ==
Modern interest in this book stems at least partly from its role as a precursor of other books with a similar design, such that the underlying circumstances of a series of murders appear to be related to an external source, such as, in this instance, Mother Goose stories. Many other later Golden Age mystery novels are constructed around a formal scheme. Agatha Christie used this motif in Ten Little Indians and a number of other novels constructed around the basis of a nursery rhyme (Hickory Dickory Dock, One, Two, Buckle My Shoe, etc.), or another linking device like the alphabet (The A.B.C. Murders).

"Philo Vance is more pedantic than ever and talks absolute rot except for passages quoted from encyclopedias about modern physics and math. A young scientist is 'framed' for a series of apparently meaningless killings and the solution is pulled out of a hat after Vance has finished lecturing."

"The murderer in this story has an uncommon sense of humor and of sportsmanship. In a non-stop trail of successive murders, a note is discovered at each scene. Each note contains a nursery rhyme with a false clue and is signed "The Bishop." Philo Vance finally puts a stop to the fun, which had included a generous sprinkling of archery, chess and astronomy, mixed with poison and bloodshed."

== Film, TV or theatrical adaptations ==
A film starring Basil Rathbone was made of The Bishop Murder Case in 1930. The film was an early "talkie" and lacks a music soundtrack.

Some elements from the mystery's plot were referenced in Dario Argento's giallo comeback movie, Sleepless (called Non ho sonno in Italy), which featured killings referencing a nursery rhyme.
