= The Kennel Murder Case (film) =

1933 film by Michael Curtiz

- Original 1933 U.S. Poster
- Directed by: Michael Curtiz
- Written by: Robert Presnell (adaptation)
- Screenplay by: Robert N. Lee; Peter Milne
- Based on: The Kennel Murder Case (1933 novel) by S.S. Van Dine
- Produced by: Robert Presnell
- Starring: William Powell; Mary Astor
- Cinematography: William Rees
- Edited by: Harold McLernon
- Music by: Bernhard Kaun
- Production company: Warner Bros. Pictures
- Distributed by: Warner Bros. Pictures
- Release date: October 28, 1933
- Running time: 73 minutes
- Country: United States
- Language: English
- Budget: $272,000
- Box office: $682,000

The Kennel Murder Case is a 1933 American pre-Code mystery film adapted from the 1933 novel of the same name by S. S. Van Dine. Directed by Michael Curtiz for Warner Bros. Pictures, it stars William Powell and Mary Astor. Powell's role as Philo Vance is not the actor's first performance as the aristocratic sleuth. For Paramount, he also portrays the character in three films: The Canary Murder Case (1929), The Greene Murder Case (1929), The Benson Murder Case (1930).

In the film, dog show competitor and fine china collector, Archer Coe, is found murdered within his own bedroom. There is a long list of suspects, since the victim had antagonized members of his family, his lover, and his employees. The corpse of the victim's brother is soon found, hidden in a coat closet. One of the other suspects survives a surprise knife attack, and the dog of Coe's neighbor is found to be seriously injured in his own house. Vance has to deduce the motives behind the attacks in order to figure out who killed Coe.

== Plot ==
When Philo Vance's dog doesn't make it into the final round of the Long Island Kennel Club's dog show, fellow affluent competitor Archer Coe is disappointed; having hoped to savor a victory over Vance. The next morning, Coe is found dead inside his bedroom by his butler, who immediately informs Coe's secretary that their employer had killed himself. District Attorney Markham and Police Sergeant Heath agree with the suicide story because Coe was found sitting in a chair in his bedroom, holding a pistol, and the door was locked from the inside. News spreads fast of Coe's apparent suicide, but Vance is not convinced, given the prior day's events, and foregoes a trip to Italy. He rides with Markham to the crime scene, and soon finds clothing and bloodstain evidence that suggests Coe was murdered. Coroner Dr. Doremus later determines the victim had bled to death internally from a stab wound after being bludgeoned by a blunt object.

There is no shortage of suspects; Coe was very much disliked. His niece, Hilda Lake, resented her uncle's tight control of her finances and blatant distrust of any man who showed interest in her. Her boyfriend, Sir Thomas MacDonald, suspected Coe of killing his dog to ensure winning the dog show. Raymond Wrede, the dead man's secretary, was in love with Miss Lake, but had been laughed at when he sought Coe's support, and heartbroken when Miss Lake informed him of her engagement to Sir Thomas. Coe's next-door neighbor and lover Doris Delafield had been cheating on him with his business associate, Eduardo Grassi. When Coe found out, he cancelled a contract to sell his vast collection of Chinese artworks to the Milan museum for which Grassi worked. Liang, the Chinese cook, had worked long, hard, and illegally to help Coe amass his collection. He warned his employer against the proposed sale, but was angrily dismissed for eavesdropping. Even Coe's own brother, Brisbane, despised him for reasons unknown. Finally, Gamble, Coe's butler, had concealed his criminal past from his employer, as deduced by Vance.

Brisbane Coe becomes Vance's prime suspect, as his alibi of taking a train at the time of the murder is disproved. However, when Brisbane is found dead in a coat closet, Vance is both puzzled and enlightened. Among Brisbane's effects, Vance finds a book titled Unsolved Murders; a bookmarked page details a method of using string and fishing tackle to lock a door through the keyhole without leaving a trace. Vance demonstrates this method for Markham and Heath.

The following morning, an attempt is made on the life of Sir Thomas in his own bedroom; the attacker wielding the same dagger used to kill Coe. Finally, a Doberman Pinscher belonging to Miss Delafield is found seriously injured in the Coe library, apparently struck with a fireside poker.

Vance resolves that two men sought to end Coe's life that fateful night. The successful murderer struggled with Coe and stabbed him, leaving him for dead, with Coe waking soon thereafter. Too dazed to recall the fight or realize that he was mortally wounded, he went upstairs to his bedroom, opened his window, and began changing into his pajamas before dying. A gloved Brisbane later entered the chamber hours later. Seeing his brother apparently asleep in his chair, he shot the corpse and arranged the scene to look like a suicide. Downstairs, he ran into the actual killer, who had seen through a next-door window that Archer Coe was still alive and come back to finish the job. In the darkness, the killer mistook Brisbane for Archer and killed the wrong man. The Doberman then came in, attracted by the commotion, and attacked the murderer.

While sure of the killer's identity, Vance has no proof. He therefore arranges for Sir Thomas and Wrede to quarrel over Hilda Lake at the Coe residence. Wrede antagonizes the couple's resolve to get married and moves to grab Sir Thomas, who sucker punches him. When Wrede instinctively reaches for a fireside poker to strike his rival, the Doberman recognizes its attacker and leaps on him. After Vance pulls the dog away, Wrede confesses that Coe struck him after refusing to assist in his courtship of Miss Lake, precipitating the struggle and subsequent stabbing.

== Cast ==
- William Powell as Philo Vance
- Mary Astor as Hilda Lake
- Eugene Pallette as Detective Heath
- Ralph Morgan as Raymond Wrede, the Secretary
- Robert McWade as District Attorney Markham
- Robert Barrat as Archer Coe
- Frank Conroy as Brisbane Coe
- Etienne Girardot as Dr. Doremus
- Paul Cavanagh as Sir Thomas MacDonald
- James Lee as Liang
- Arthur Hohl as Gamble, the butler
- Helen Vinson as Doris Delafield
- Jack La Rue as Eduardo Grassi

Uncredited:

- Harry Allen as Sandy
- Wade Boteler as Sergeant Mellish
- George Chandler as first reporter at police station
- Spencer Charters as Sgt. Snitkin
- Leo White as desk clerk

Cast notes:

- The records of Warner Bros. indicate that original casting included Hugh Herbert as Dr. Doremus, George Blackwood as Bruce MacDonald and Claire Dodd as Doris Delafield. Ralph Bellamy was reported to have been signed to perform in the film, but he does not appear in the film as released.

== Production ==
The Kennel Murder Case was the first adaptation of one of S. S. Van Dine's Philo Vance novels to be filmed by Warner Bros. Early Vance films had been made by Paramount Pictures, and later ones would be made by Warners, Paramount and MGM. Vance would be played by Warren William, Paul Lukas, Edmund Lowe, and James Stephenson.

Director Michael Curtiz covered the talkiness of the film, endemic to whodunnits of this sort, by using a mobile camera in some scenes, and kept up the pace of the film with dissolves and wipes.

== Reception ==
Film historian William K. Everson, who pronounced the film a "masterpiece" in the August 1984 issue of Films in Review, considers The Kennel Murder Case to be one of the greatest screen adaptations of a Golden Age mystery novel; Everson ranks it with the 1946 film Green for Danger.

The film made a profit of almost $400,000. According to Warner Bros records the film earned $441,000 domestically and $241,000 internationally.

== Remake ==
Warners remade The Kennel Murder Case in 1940 as Calling Philo Vance, with James Stephenson playing Vance.
