= The Gracie Allen Murder Case (film) =

1939 film by Alfred E. Green

- Theatrical release poster
- Directed by: Alfred E. Green
- Screenplay by: Nat Perrin
- Based on: The Gracie Allen Murder Case; 1938 novel by S. S. Van Dine
- Produced by: George M. Arthur; Alfred E. Green
- Starring: Gracie Allen; Warren William; Ellen Drew; Kent Taylor; Judith Barrett; Donald MacBride; Jed Prouty
- Cinematography: Charles Lang
- Edited by: Paul Weatherwax
- Music by: Gerard Carbonara; Leo Shuken
- Production company: Paramount Pictures
- Distributed by: Paramount Pictures
- Release date: June 2, 1939
- Running time: 78 minutes
- Country: United States
- Language: English

The Gracie Allen Murder Case is a 1939 American comedy mystery film taken from the Philo Vance series by writer S.S. Van Dine and directed by Alfred E. Green from a screenplay by Nat Perrin. The film stars the female member of the comedy duo Burns and Allen Gracie Allen, Warren William, Ellen Drew, Kent Taylor, Judith Barrett, Donald MacBride and Jed Prouty. The film was released on June 2, 1939, by Paramount Pictures.

== Plot ==
Gracie Allen tries to help master sleuth Philo Vance solve a murder. Allen's uncle fixes her up with Bill at a company picnic. When the two go out to a nightclub that night, Gracie inadvertently links Bill to the murder of a thug after finding the dead body and Bill's cigarette case at the scene of the crime. While being questioned at the club, she meets Vance who's investigating the homicide. After Gracie's bungled attempts to solve the case, Vance decides it might be easier to have her working with him. Despite Gracie's "help," the two eventually find the real killer.

== Cast ==
- Gracie Allen as Gracie Allen
- Warren William as Philo Vance
- Ellen Drew as Ann Wilson
- Kent Taylor as Bill Brown
- Judith Barrett as Dixie Del Marr
- Donald MacBride as Dist. Atty. John Markham
- Jed Prouty as Uncle Ambrose
- Jerome Cowan as Daniel Mirche
- H. B. Warner as Richard Lawrence
- William Demarest as Police Sgt. Ernest Heath
- Sam Lee as Thug
- Al Shaw as Thug
- Richard Denning as Fred
- Irving Bacon as Hotel Clerk
- Lillian Yarbo as Maid (uncredited)
