= Calling Philo Vance =

1940 film by William Clemens

- Theatrical poster
- Directed by: William Clemens
- Screenplay by: Tom Reed
- Based on: The Kennel Murder Case; 1933 novel by S.S. Van Dine
- Produced by: Brian Foy (assoc. prod; uncredited
- Starring: James Stephenson; Margot Stevenson
- Cinematography: L. William O'Connell
- Edited by: Benjamin Liss; Louis Lindsay
- Production company: Warner Bros. Pictures
- Distributed by: Warner Bros. Pictures
- Release date: February 3, 1940
- Running time: 62 minutes
- Country: United States
- Language: English

Calling Philo Vance is a 1940 American mystery/comedy film produced by Warner Bros. starring James Stephenson as the dilettante detective Philo Vance, his only appearance as the character; Margot Stevenson, Henry O'Neill, Edward Brophy, Sheila Bromley and Ralph Forbes appear in support. It was directed by William Clemens from a screenplay by Tom Reed, based on the 1933 novel The Kennel Murder Case by S.S. Van Dine, which had been made into a film in 1933, starring William Powell and Mary Astor.

For this adaptation of the story, Vance is on an international assignment with the United States government to investigate traffic in wartime aircraft designs. The original story dealt with art world double-dealing, but the solution to the mystery is the same in both films. Sgt. Heath, Vance's usual police irritant, is renamed Ryan.

== Cast ==
- James Stephenson as Philo Vance
- Margot Stevenson as Hilda Lake
- Henry O'Neill as J.P. Markham
- Edward Brophy as Ryan
- Sheila Bromley as Doris Delafield
- Ralph Forbes as Taylor McDonald
- Don Douglas as Philip Wrede
- Martin Kosleck as Gamble
- Jimmy Conlin as Dr. Doremus (misspelled in the credits as Conlon)
- Edward Raquello as Eduardo Grassi
- Creighton Hale as Du Bois
- Harry Strang as Markham's assistant
- Richard Kipling as Archer Coe
- Wedgwood Nowell as Brisbane Coe
- Bo Ling as Ling Toy
- Olaf Hytten as Charles (uncredited)
- George Irving as Avery (uncredited)
- Frank Mayo as Doorman (uncredited)

== Production ==
Warner Bros. intended to revitalize the Philo Vance series with British stage actor James Stephenson, but Stephenson never played the part again – he died of a heart attack in 1941. Actors George Reeves, known for playing Superman on television in the 1950s, and William Hopper, noted for playing Paul Drake on the Perry Mason in the 1950s and 1960s, both played small roles in the film. Vance's dog McTavish was played by Terry, who also played Toto in The Wizard of Oz.

Calling Philo Vance had the working titles Philo Vance Comes Back and Philo Vance Returns.
