= The Canary Murder Case =

1927 novel by S. S. Van Dine

The "Canary" Murder Case
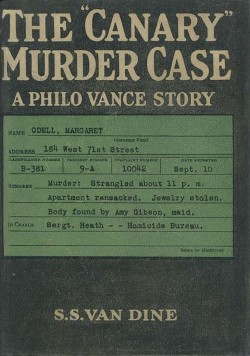
- First edition cover
- Author: S. S. Van Dine
- Language: English
- Series: Philo Vance
- Genre: Mystery
- Publisher: Scribner's
- Publication date: 1927
- Publication place: United States
- Media type: Print (hardback & paperback)
- Pages: 343 pp
- Preceded by: The Benson Murder Case
- Followed by: The Greene Murder Case

The "Canary" Murder Case (1927) is a murder mystery novel which deals with the murders of an attractive nightclub singer known as "the Canary," and, eventually, her boyfriend, solved by Philo Vance. S. S. Van Dine's classic whodunnit, second in the Philo Vance series, is said by Howard Haycraft to have broken "all modern publishing records for detective fiction." The earliest editions give the title with quotation marks around the word "Canary", but most subsequent editions omit them.

== Plot summary ==
Margaret Odell, a Broadway performer and ex-Follies girl known as "The Canary", is found murdered in her apartment. She has a number of men in her life, ranging from high society to gangsters, and more than one man visited her apartment on the night she dies. Philo Vance's erudition leads him to a key clue that allows him to penetrate an alibi and reveal the killer. "The strangeness, the daring, the seeming impenetrability of the crime marked it as one of the most singular and astonishing cases in New York's police annals; and had it not been for Philo Vance's participation in its solution, I firmly believe it would have remained one of the great unsolved mysteries of this country."

== Literary significance and criticism ==
"It is difficult now to grasp the extent of Van Dine's success in America, and to a much lesser extent in Britain. ... Van Dine's second book was on the American best-seller lists for months ... It was said that he had lifted the detective story on to the plane of a fine art, and by his own account he was the favourite crime writer of two Presidents."

Some contemporary reviews: "A model of everything a detective story should be – a monument, a cathedral amongst detective stories." Arnold Palmer in the London Sphere. "Not only a rattling good yarn that holds you to the end – it's an education in itself. ... Belongs to the aristocracy of detective fiction." Harry Hansen in the New York World. "One of the most ingenious and thrilling tales of crime that I have seen. Philo Vance is an original and fascinating person." William Lyon Phelps.

The Canary Murder Mystery today is primarily of interest as a classic puzzle mystery. With Symons writing in 1974, "It should be said that the best of the Van Dine stories are models of construction. Utterly remote from real life, they remain fascinating by strict adherence to the rules of their own dotty logic, and through their creator's self-absorbed immersion in his own work."

Author and radio raconteur Jean Shepherd cited The Canary Murder Case as his earliest literary inspiration. One detailed discussion was during his February 1, 1968 broadcast on WOR.

Poster for the movie The Canary Murder Case (1929) with Louise Brooks as The Canary

== Film, TV or theatrical adaptations ==
A film, The Canary Murder Case, was made by Paramount Pictures in 1929, directed by Malcolm St. Clair and Frank Tuttle and starring William Powell as Philo Vance and Louise Brooks as the Canary.
