= Pearl Foley =

Canadian crime writer (1888–1953)

Charlotte Beatrix "Pearl" Foley (September 3, 1888 – October 12, 1953) was a Canadian crime writer. She sometimes went by the pseudonym Paul de Mar.

== Early life and education ==
Charlotte Beatrix Foley was born to Mr. and Mrs. John A. Foley in Toronto, Ontario, on September 3, 1888. She attended the University of Toronto as well as the Ontario College of Art.

As of 1924, Foley lived at 165 Wellesley Crescent in Toronto.

== Career ==
Foley wrote four books: The Gift of the Gods (1921), The Octagon Crystal (1929), The Gnome Mine Mystery (1933, as Paul de Mar) and The Yellow Circle (1937).

Octagon Crystal follows "Red Hawk", described as a "Narragansett chief", beset by criminals seeking the eponymous crystal. In parallel, the young couple of Forrest Selwyn and Ralph Lorriston engaged in a "checkered" courtship. A reviewer in The Buffalo Times was not thrilled with the read, calling it a "detective story without the detective".

Gift of the Gods is about a Chinese girl who visits North America.

A mediocre review in The New York Times described Yellow Circle, a murder mystery, as reminiscent of the Philo Vance novels. The novel features Richard North, a detective who appears in some of Foley's other works. It was serialized in the Toronto Star beginning in 1938.

Gnome Mine Mystery is about a crime involving a mine in northern Ontario.

As of 1938, Foley also worked in a department store evaluating customers' credit.

== Works ==
- The Gift of the Gods (Toronto: Allen, 1921)
- The Octagon Crystal (Brentano; New York: Carrier, 1929)
- The Gnome Mine Mystery: A Northern Ontario Mining Story, as Paul de Mar (London: Hamilton, 1933)
- The Yellow Circle (Philadelphia: Lippincott, 1937)

== Death ==
Foley died at Toronto General Hospital on October 12, 1953.
