= The Canary Murder Case (film) =

1929 film

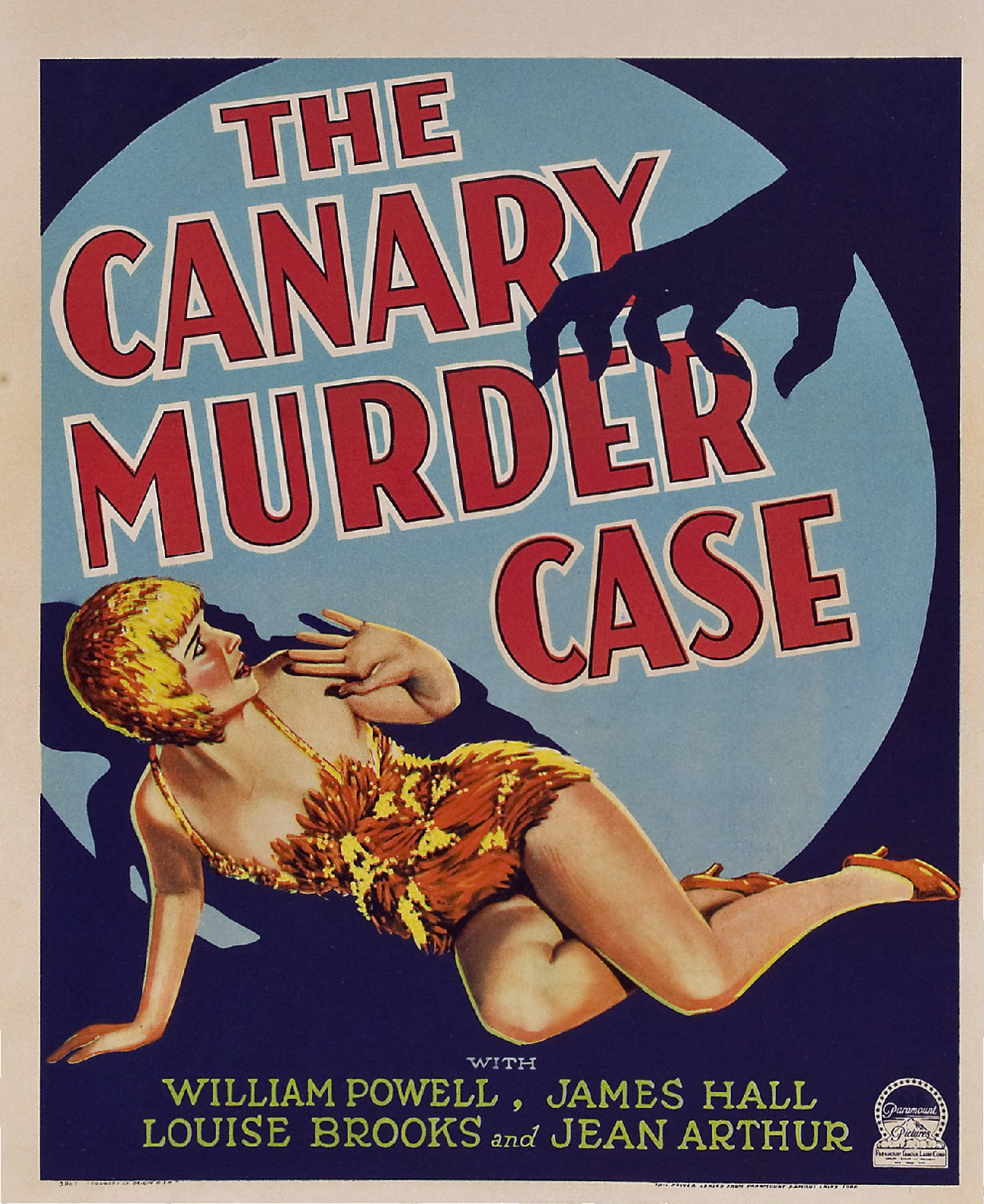
- Theatrical poster
- Directed by: Malcolm St. Clair (Note: Frank Tuttle directed scenes added to the sound version of the film, but was uncredited.)
- Written by: S. S. Van Dine; Albert Shelby LeVino; Florence Ryerson; Herman J. Mankiewicz (Note: Mankiewicz wrote the titles for the silent version.)
- Based on: the novel The Canary Murder Case; 1927 novel by S. S. Van Dine
- Produced by: Louis D. Lighton
- Starring: William Powell; Jean Arthur; James Hall; Louise Brooks
- Cinematography: Harry Fischbeck; Cliff Blackstone
- Edited by: William Shea
- Music by: Karl Hajos
- Distributed by: Paramount Pictures
- Release date: February 16, 1929
- Running time: 82 minutes
- Country: United States
- Language: English

The Canary Murder Case is a 1929 American pre-Code crime-mystery film based on the 1927 novel of the same name by S.S. Van Dine (the pseudonym for Willard Huntington Wright). The film was directed by Malcolm St. Clair, with a screenplay by Wright (under the Van Dine pseudonym), Albert Shelby LeVino, and Florence Ryerson. William Powell starred in the role of detective Philo Vance, with Louise Brooks co-starring as "The Canary"; Jean Arthur, James Hall, and Charles Lane also co-starred in other principal roles.

The first film to feature the Vance character, the film revolves around Vance's investigation into the murder of a conniving showgirl. It is a prime example of many films initially produced as a silent film before being turned into a "talkie", as the format quickly became the industry norm. The film was instrumental in expanding the career of Powell, who had previously been known in villain roles. Conversely, Brooks' refusal to participate in the sound reshoots famously led to controversy from which her career never recovered; her role was dubbed by Margaret Livingston.

The Canary Murder Case was released by Paramount Pictures on February 16, 1929, to mixed reviews; the dubbing of Brooks was heavily panned by critics. However, the film was successful enough that Powell filmed two sequels with Paramount, The Greene Murder Case (1929) and The Benson Murder Case (1930), as well as The Kennel Murder Case (1933) at rival studio Warner Bros.

== Plot ==
The Canary Murder Case (1929)

Charles Spottswoode is happy when his son Jimmie breaks off his affair with conniving showgirl Margaret O'Dell – known as "The Canary" – and reconciles his engagement with her co-star and neighbor Alice La Fosse. Spottswoode goes to see The Canary to bribe her to leave Jimmie alone, but she declines his offer; she wishes to marry Jimmie to further her ambitions of joining the social elite. She threatens to reveal Jimmie's embezzlement from the elder Spottswoode's bank if Jimmie marries Alice, and despite his pleading, refuses to negotiate. After Spottswoode leaves, she telephones two club patrons she has been blackmailing, Cleaver and Mannix, to demand one final generous gift from each of them by the next day; she makes the same request of "creepy" admirer Dr. Lindquist. Her former husband Tony Skeel – who has broken out of prison and into her apartment and has overheard her phone calls – demands half of the blackmail. She refuses to give him anything, even after he hits her. The following night around midnight, Spottswoode visits her again, but is again unable to change her mind. After he reaches the lobby of her building, he and another person hear screams from her place. They knock on the door, but she assures them that she is fine. Cleaver, Mannix and Lindquist are all shown lurking about her apartment building late that night.

The Canary is found strangled the next day; the coroner places the time of death around midnight. District Attorney Markham investigates, aided by Spottswoode's close friend Philo Vance, and Police Sergeant Heath. After all the suspects are brought in for questioning, Vance asks Markham to keep them waiting for a few hours. Markham agrees. Vance subtly maneuvers Cleaver, Mannix, Lindquist and the two Spottswoodes into playing poker to pass the time so he can observe their personality traits. Only the elder Spottswoode shows the daring, imagination and discipline required for the crime; Spottswoode bluffs Vance, betting everything with just a pair of deuces. Upon the production of a photograph of Skeel, the man who witnessed O'Dell's murder, the suspects are released.

Skeel, who witnessed the murder while hiding in the closet, sends the killer several blackmail letters. He too is strangled. A pen found at the scene has Jimmie's name on it, so Heath arrests him for the murder. Jimmie then confesses to both murders, but Vance knows better. He telephones Charles Spottswoode with the news and suggests they meet in an hour. Spottswoode speeds to the city from his country estate to confess, but his chauffeur makes a fatal mistake by trying to beat a train to a crossing, and Spottswoode is killed. Now Vance has to show how Charles murdered the Canary in order to free Jimmie. He is able to prove that the Canary was dead before Spottswoode left her apartment that night. Spottswoode had made a recording (Vance speculates it was Spottswoode himself pretending to be the woman) to fool a stuttering witness into believing the Canary was alive after her death. The recording is found in the apartment, and Jimmie is released.

== Cast ==
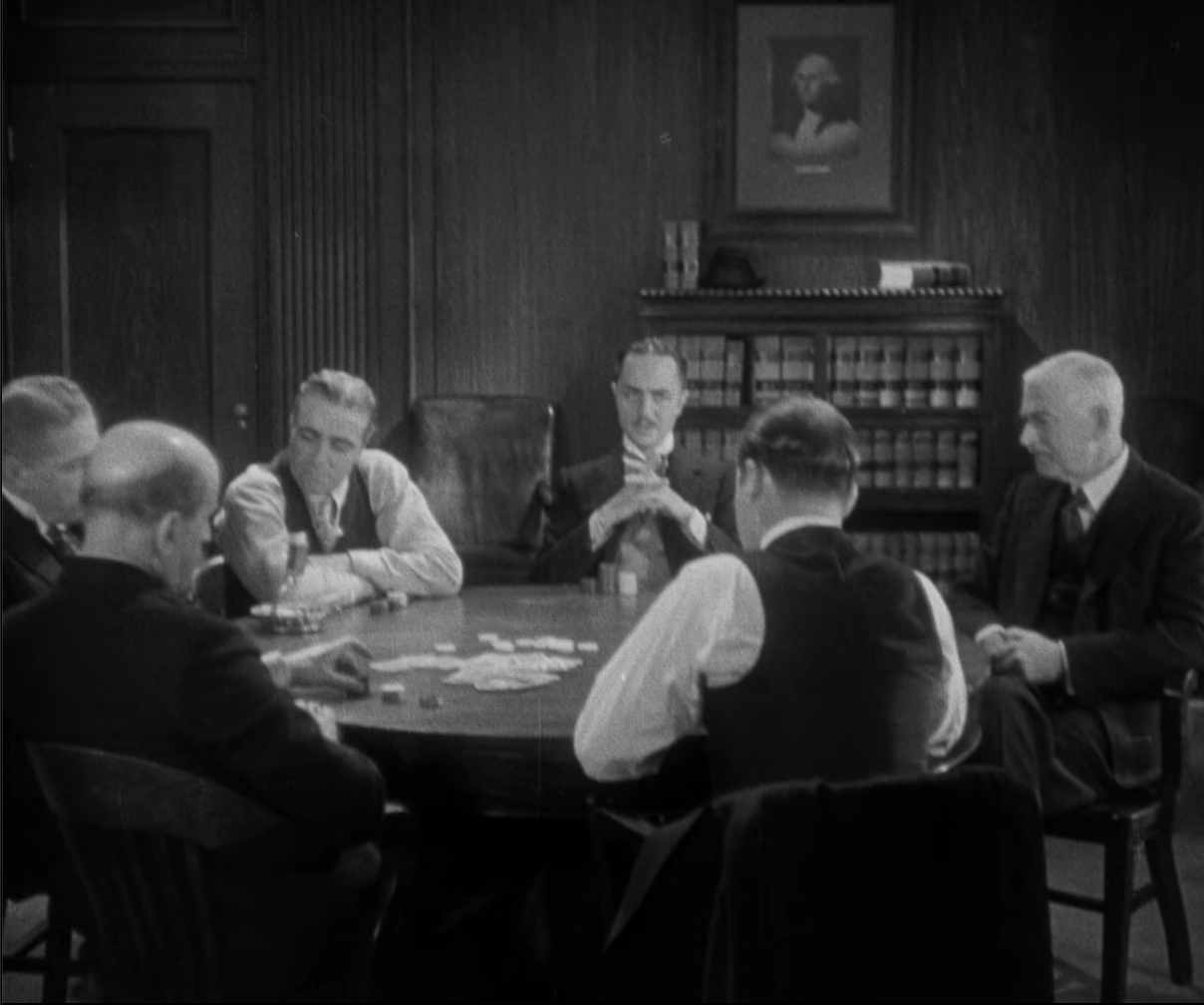
Philo Vance and all the film's major suspects during a poker scene—clockwise, the characters seen are Philo Vance, Charles Spottswoode, Louis Mannix, Dr. Ambrose Lindquist, John Cleaver, and Jimmie Spottswoode

- William Powell as Philo Vance
- Jean Arthur as Alice La Fosse
- James Hall as Jimmie Spottswoode
- Louise Brooks as "The Canary" [Margaret O'Dell]
  - Margaret Livingston provided the voice of The Canary uncredited, and was a double for some reshot scenes.
- Charles Willis Lane as Charles Spottswoode
- Lawrence Grant as John Cleaver
- Gustav von Seyffertitz as Dr. Ambrose Lindquist
- E. H. Calvert as District Attorney Markham
- Eugene Pallette as Sergeant Ernest Heath
- Ned Sparks as Tony Skeel
- Louis John Bartels as Louis Mannix
- Tim Adair as George Y. Harvey (uncredited)
- Oscar Smith as Elevator boy (uncredited)

== Production ==
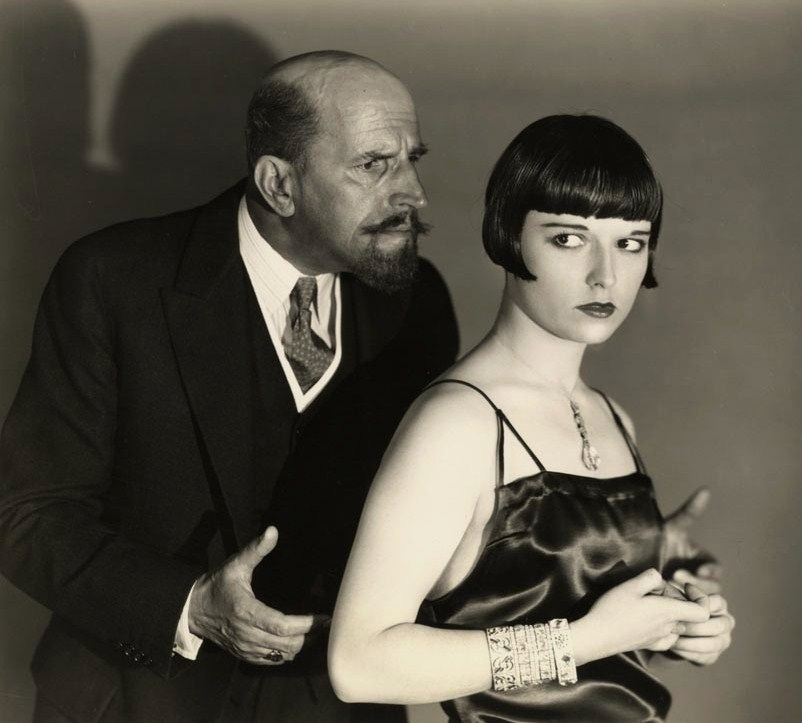
Gustav von Seyffertitz and Louise Brooks for The Canary Murder Case

The film was initially produced as a silent picture from September 11 to October 12, 1928, with Malcolm St. Clair directing. However, after production wrapped, Paramount looked to convert all of their silent films in the can into "talkies". Rival studio Warner Bros. had debuted the first full-talking picture Lights of New York earlier that year, and it had proved to be extremely profitable for the studio. By the end of 1928, all of the major studios were preparing to quickly transition from silent pictures to sound. The Canary Murder Case was one example of a trend among the studios during this time: turning a silent picture into a talkie by dubbing the cast over scenes of the silent film, and adding some new scenes.

Dubbing and reshoots were complete by December 28. The total cost of the picture, plus sound changes, was no more than $200,000.

Louise Brooks completed her contract for Paramount with the film, and declined to renew it after the studio refused her request for a raise. She left to make two films for director G. W. Pabst in Germany. Paramount cabled her in Berlin, demanding that she return to record her lines. Brooks took the position that she no longer had an obligation to Paramount, and refused. Unable to convince her to return, Paramount hired actress Margaret Livingston to dub Brooks' dialogue, and reshoot scenes where possible; Livingston was seen only in profile or from behind. Reshoots took place on December 19, 1928, with Frank Tuttle directing.

== Reception ==
The Canary Murder Case was released as both a silent and sound film. The film was released as an 80-minute talkie in most markets, and as a shorter silent in theaters not yet "wired for sound." A few publications, such as The Film Daily, reviewed both formats. In side-by-side reviews,The Film Daily noted the length of the sound version to be 7171 feet, while the silent version was given as 5843 feet. The film received mixed reviews from critics, with specific notice and criticism towards Livingston's dubbing over Brooks. The New York World stated the film was "an example of a good movie plot gone wrong as the result of spoken dialogue", while The Cincinnati Enquirer called Brooks "much more satisfying optically than auditorily."

Arthur herself later claimed that, during this time, she was a "very poor actress... inexperienced so far as genuine training was concerned."

== See also ==
- List of early sound feature films (1926–1929)

== Bibliography ==
- Oller, John (1997). Jean Arthur: The Actress Nobody Knew. Limelight Editions. p. 53. ISBN 9780879100902.
- Tuska, Jon (1971). Philo Vance: The Life and Times of S.S. Van Dine. Bowling Green, Ohio: Bowling Green University Popular Press. OCLC 587935.
