= The Scarab Murder Case =

1930 novel by S.S. Van Dine

- First US edition
- Author: S. S. Van Dine
- Language: English
- Series: Philo Vance
- Genre: Mystery
- Publisher: Ernest Benn (UK) & Scribner's (US)
- Publication date: 1930
- Publication place: United States
- Media type: Print (hardback & paperback)
- Preceded by: The Bishop Murder Case
- Followed by: The Kennel Murder Case

The Scarab Murder Case (1930) is a classic whodunit written by S. S. Van Dine. In this book, detective Philo Vance's murder investigation takes place in a private home that doubles as a museum of Egyptology, and the solution depends in part on Vance's extensive knowledge of Egyptian history and customs, which enable him to sort through suggestions of godly vengeance and reveal the misdirections perpetrated by the real murderer.

== Literary significance and criticism ==
Some reviewers "were disgusted by the author's bland insults to the reader's intelligence -- e.g., the heavy Egyptian statue in the gallery, upended on a piece of a pencil and conveniently toppling onto the intended victim. By that time, they were fed up with the whole bag of tricks, which successive settings did not rejuvenate."

== Film adaptation ==
The Scarab Murder Case (1936) starred Wilfrid Hyde-White as Vance.
