= The Garden Murder Case =

1935 novel by S.S. Van Dine

- First edition (US)
- Author: S. S. Van Dine
- Language: English
- Series: Philo Vance
- Genre: Mystery fiction
- Publisher: Scribner's (USA); Cassell (UK)
- Publication date: 1935
- Publication place: United States
- Media type: Print (hardback & paperback)
- Preceded by: The Casino Murder Case
- Followed by: The Kidnap Murder Case

The Garden Murder Case (first published in 1935) is the ninth in a series of mystery novels by S. S. Van Dine about fictional detective Philo Vance.

== Plot outline ==
Floyd, the son of Professor Garden, invites his socialite friends to the rooftop garden of his father's New York penthouse to listen to the outcome of horse races. Detective Philo Vance receives an anonymous telephone message inviting him to one of Floyd's gatherings. On that particular night, Floyd's best friend has placed an enormous bet on a horse named Equanimity. Once it is announced that Equanimity has lost the race, a gunshot is heard and Floyd's friend is found dead of a gunshot wound. Though initially thought to be a suicide, Detective Vance deems the death a murder. The night proves to be even more eventful, due to the attempted poisoning of Floyd's mother's nurse and the subsequent murder of his mother. Ultimately, Detective Vance is able to solve the murders. He lures the murderer into revealing himself and gathers photographic evidence of him trying to push the detective off of the garden balcony.

== Literary significance and criticism ==
Crime novelist and critic Julian Symons wrote, "The decline in the last six Vance books is so steep that the critic who called the ninth of them [i.e. The Garden Murder Case] 'one more stitch in his literary shroud' was not overstating the case."

== Film adaptation ==
The Garden Murder Case (1936) starred Edmund Lowe as Philo Vance, was directed by Edwin L. Marin and was released by Metro-Goldwyn-Mayer.
