= E. H. Calvert =

American actor and director

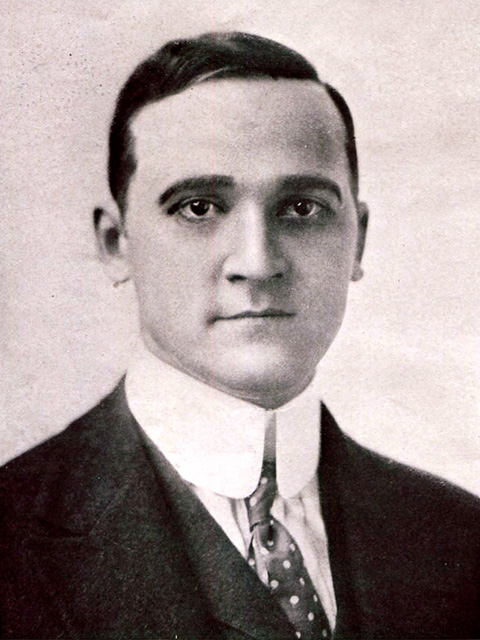
- Calvert in 1916
- Born: William Helm; June 27, 1863; Alexandria, Virginia, U.S.
- Died: October 5, 1941 (aged 78); Hollywood, California, U.S.
- Occupations: Actor, film director
- Years active: 1912–1939

Elisha Helm Calvert (born William Helm; June 27, 1863 – October 5, 1941) was an American film actor and director. He appeared in more than 170 films, as well as directing a further 60 titles, often using his military title "Captain E. H. Calvert". Today's audiences may know him from his portrayals of district attorney Markham in the early Philo Vance murder mysteries; Wheeler and Woolsey's senior officer and foil in Half Shot at Sunrise; and one of the college professors having an audience with Groucho Marx in Horse Feathers.

== Early life ==
He was born William Helm in Madison, Wisconsin, (or in Alexandria, Virginia), and died in Hollywood, California. Calvert was a Spanish–American War veteran who served in Cuba. He was a member of the Adventurers Club of New York. Calvert was raised in Madison and graduated from Central High School.

== Career ==
He acted for a summer at the Fuller Opera House. After a military career from which he retired as a captain, he acted in stock theater, including working in Arizona, where he acted with Theodore Roberts. He also performed in vaudeville. For 18 years, he was a director, beginning with the Essanay Company. He also acted in films for Essanay.

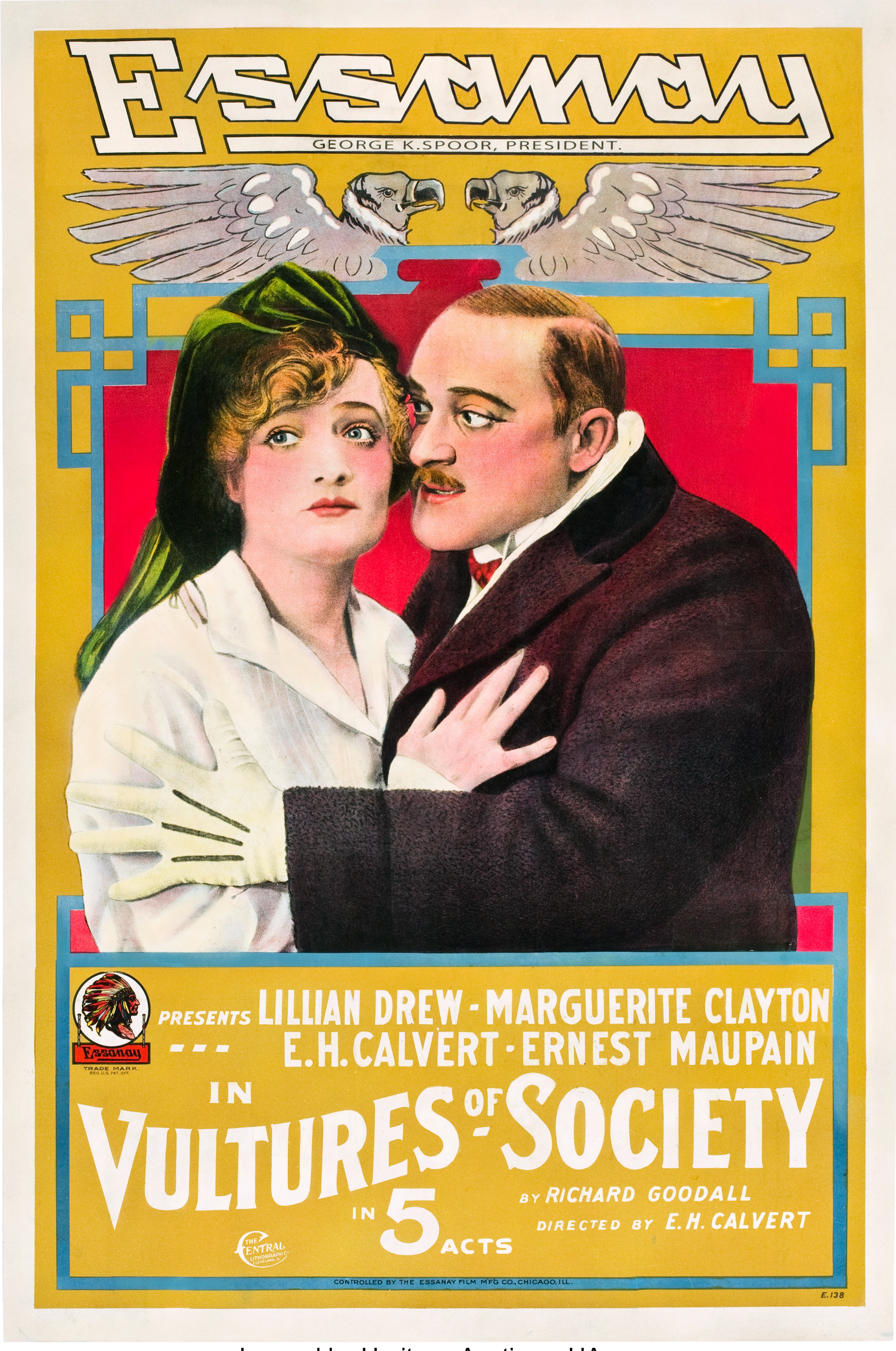
Vultures of Society posted noting Calvert in cast and as director

Calvert had a son, also named William Helm, who died in a fire-related freak accident in 1939. Calvert senior retired from the screen that same year, and died two years later.

== Selected filmography ==
- From the Submerged (1912)
- The Snare (1912)
- One Wonderful Night (1914, director) - Chief Detective Steingall
- The Showman (1914)
- The Slim Princess (1915, director)
- The Crimson Wing (1915) - Count Ludwig von Leun-Walram
- A Daughter of the City (1915) - Henry L. Bancroft
- Vultures of Society (1916) - Raymond Raphael and director
- According to the Code (1916) - Judge Andrews
- The Wide, Wrong Way, an Essanay two-reep short (1917, director)
- Branded (1920, director)
- Affinities (1922)
- Silent Evidence (1922, director)
- The Silent Partner (1923) - Jim Harker
- Why Men Leave Home (1924) - Arthur Phillips
- Bluff (1924) - Norbert Conroy
- The Only Woman (1924) - Rodney Blake
- Inez from Hollywood (1924) - Gardner
- East of Suez (1925) - Sidney Forbes
- Sally (1925) - Richard Farquar
- The Talker (1925) - Mr. Grayson
- Havoc (1925) - Regimental Adjutant
- The Girl from Montmartre (1926) - Lord Robert Hautrive
- Ella Cinders (1926) - Studio Actor (uncredited)
- The House Without a Key (1926, Serial) - Dan Winterclip
- Melting Millions (1927)
- Rookies (1927) - Colonel
- The First Auto (1927) - Elmer Hays (uncredited)
- Lonesome Ladies (1927) - Mr. Burton
- The Wizard (1927) - Edwin Palmer
- West Point (1927) - Superintendent (uncredited)
- The Man Without a Face (1928, Serial)
- Let 'Er Go Gallegher (1928) - City Editor
- The Legion of the Condemned (1928) - Commandant
- Why Sailors Go Wrong (1928) - Cyrus Green
- 4 Devils (1928)
- Moran of the Marines (1928) - Gen. Marshall
- Prep and Pep (1928) - Col. Marsh
- The City of Youth (1928, director)
- The Canary Murder Case (1929) - Dist. Atty. John F.X. Markham
- Blue Skies (1929) - Mr. Semple Jones (episode 1)
- The Studio Murder Mystery (1929) - Grant (uncredited)
- Thunderbolt (1929) - Dist. Atty. McKay
- Dark Streets (1929) - Police Lieutenant
- The Greene Murder Case (1929) - Dist. Atty. John F.X. Markham
- Fast Company (1929) - Platt
- Illusion (1929) - Doctor (uncredited)
- The Virginian (1929) - Judge Henry
- The Mighty (1929) - Major General
- The Love Parade (1929) - Sylvanian Ambassador
- Darkened Rooms (1929) - Mr. Clayton (uncredited)
- Peacock Alley (1930) - Paul
- The Kibitzer (1930) - Westcott
- Behind the Make-Up (1930) - Dawson
- Only the Brave (1930) - The Colonel
- Men Are Like That (1930) - Superintendent (uncredited)
- The Benson Murder Case (1930) - Dist. Atty. John F.X. Markham
- Ladies Love Brutes (1930) - Committeeman (uncredited)
- The Social Lion (1930) - Henderson
- The Border Legion (1930) - Judge Savin
- A Man from Wyoming (1930) - Maj. Gen. Hunter
- Let's Go Native (1930) - Diner (uncredited)
- Half Shot at Sunrise (1930) - Gen. Hale (uncredited)
- The Widow from Chicago (1930) - Police Captain R.L. Davis
- Beyond Victory (1931) - Commanding Officer (uncredited)
- Graft (1931) - Police Inspector (uncredited)
- Horse Feathers (1932) - Professor in Wagstaff's office (uncredited)
- The Conquerors (1932) - Doctor
- Wild Horse Mesa (1932) - Sheriff
- The Mysterious Rider (1933) - Sheriff Matt Arnold
- The Power and the Glory (1933) - Board of Directors (uncredited)
- Duck Soup (1933) - Officer in Battle Sequence (uncredited)
- The House of Rothschild (1934) - Lord Chamberlain (uncredited)
- Here Comes the Groom (1934) - George Randolph
- One Exciting Adventure (1934) - Casino Door Man (uncredited)
- The Mighty Barnum (1934) - House Detective (uncredited)
- Rumba (1935) - Police Captain (uncredited)
- So Red the Rose (1935) - Cavalry Major (uncredited)
- Death from a Distance (1935) - District Attorney
- Western Courage (1935) - Colonel Austin
- The Oregon Trail (1936) - Jim Ridgeley
- Murder at Glen Athol (1936) - District Attorney McDougal
- The Glory Trail (1936) - Colonel Strong
- Ellis Island (1936) - Commissioner H.L. Carson (uncredited)
- Union Pacific (1939) - Major (uncredited) (final film role)
