= The Casino Murder Case =

1934 novel by S.S. Van Dine

- First edition
- Author: S. S. Van Dine
- Language: English
- Series: Philo Vance
- Genre: Mystery novel
- Publisher: Scribner's (US) & Cassell (UK)
- Publication date: 1934
- Publication place: United States
- Media type: Print (hardback & paperback)
- Preceded by: The Dragon Murder Case
- Followed by: The Garden Murder Case

The Casino Murder Case is a 1934 novel written by S. S. Van Dine in the series about fictional detective Philo Vance. In this outing, a murder investigation is connected with a private casino on New York's Upper West Side, and the wealthy and unorthodox family that operates it. It was adapted into a film in 1935.

== Plot summary ==
Philo Vance receives an anonymous letter alerting him to the possibility that violence will soon be done within a well-known family. The letter also suggests that something of interest will take place that night at the casino. Vance attends, and witnesses the collapse of the son and heir to the family fortune, a heavy gambler, due to his having been poisoned immediately after he drinks a glass of water from the casino manager's private decanter. At approximately the same time, across town, the son's wife, a former Broadway musical star, dies from poison. The curious factor is that the medical examiner cannot identify the way in which the poison was administered to the wife, except to say that no traces were found in the stomach (and no marks of a hypodermic are found). Vance attends the son's home, and investigates the wife's death.

Later that evening, the sister of the son and heir is also poisoned. When he recovers, the son suggests that his mother may have been responsible for the poisoning, but Vance also finds a note that suggests that the wife committed suicide.

There are other characters connected with the family upon whom suspicion falls, including the sister's two suitors, one of whom is the family physician and the other the chief croupier at the family casino, and the children's uncle, who manages the casino.

Vance must determine the method by which the poison was administered, and, at the same time, follows a trail that leads to one of the character's research into the production of deuterium, or "heavy water", which had just been discovered in 1934. Having worked out the murderer's plot and identity, Vance puts himself at the mercy of the murderer, who is holding Vance at gunpoint, in order to hear a confession. The murderer is killed in an exciting climax.

== Literary significance and criticism ==
Crime novelist and critic Julian Symons wrote: "The decline in the last six Vance books is so steep that the critic who called the ninth of them one more stitch in his literary shroud was not overstating the case." This book is the second of the final six Vance books.

== Film adaptations ==
See The Casino Murder Case (film)

The Casino Murder Case (1935) starred Paul Lukas as Philo Vance, and was a fairly faithful reproduction of the principal details of the novel. Rosalind Russell co-stars.
