= The Kidnap Murder Case =

1936 novel by S.S. Van Dine

- First edition
- Author: S. S. Van Dine
- Language: English
- Series: Philo Vance
- Genre: Mystery, detective novel
- Publisher: Charles Scribner's Sons
- Publication date: 1936
- Publication place: United States
- Media type: Print (hardback & paperback)
- Pages: 316 pp
- Preceded by: The Garden Murder Case
- Followed by: The Gracie Allen Murder Case

The Kidnap Murder Case is a 1936 murder mystery novel by S. S. Van Dine, the tenth of twelve books featuring fictional detective Philo Vance.

== Plot summary ==
A member of the wealthy Kenting family is kidnapped, and Philo Vance's suspicions lead him to the victim's home, the "Purple House" on New York's 86th Street. A mysterious ransom note and the family collection of gems both play a part in the plot, which ends with the murderer's suicide with the connivance of Vance. "To be sure, the motive for the crime, or, I should say, crimes, was the sordid one of monetary gain ... through Vance's determination and fearlessness, through his keen insight into human nature and his amazing flair for the ramifications of human psychology, he was able to penetrate beyond the seemingly conclusive manifestations of the case."

== Literary significance and criticism ==
Crime novelist and critic Julian Symons wrote, "The decline in the last six Vance books is so steep that the critic who called the ninth of them one more stitch in his literary shroud was not overstating the case."
