= The Kennel Murder Case =

1933 novel by S.S. Van Dine

- First edition
- Author: S.S. Van Dine
- Language: English
- Series: Philo Vance novels
- Genre: Mystery
- Publisher: Charles Scribner's Sons (first edition), Macmillan Publishers (reprint)
- Publication date: 1933
- Publication place: United States
- Media type: Print (hardcover, 1st edition) (paperback reprint)
- Pages: 307 pp.
- Preceded by: The Scarab Murder Case
- Followed by: The Dragon Murder Case

The Kennel Murder Case is a 1933 murder mystery novel written by S. S. Van Dine with fictional detective Philo Vance investigating a complex locked-room mystery.

== Plot summary ==
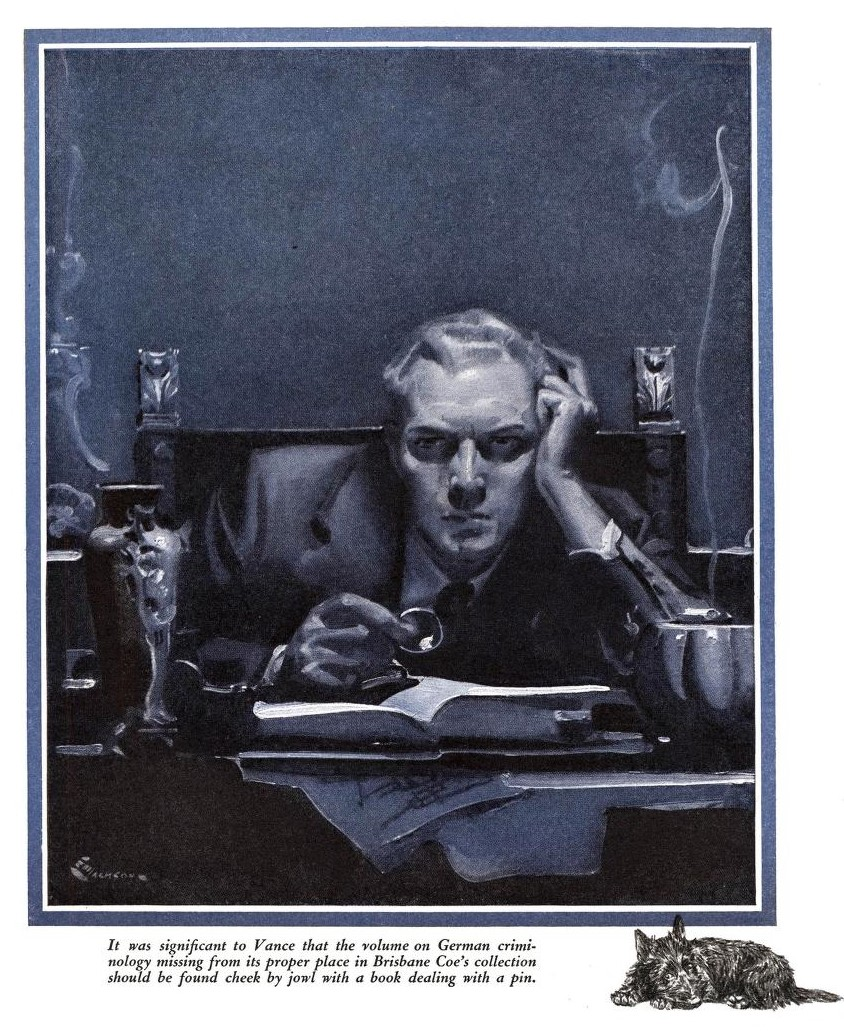
E. M. Jackson illustrated the first appearance of The Kennel Murder Case for Cosmopolitan magazine (November 1932 – February 1933).

One of the Coe brothers is found dead in his bedroom, locked from the inside, and the other brother is found dead the next morning in the downstairs closet. There is also the clue of a wounded Scottish Terrier, a shy Doberman Pinscher, a mysteriously broken piece of priceless Chinese porcelain, and a cast of suspicious family members, servants and associates. Philo Vance solves the case based on his knowledge of dog breeding, Chinese porcelain and the annals of remarkable antique crimes.

== Film adaptations ==
See The Kennel Murder Case (film)

A Warner Bros. film version of The Kennel Murder Case appeared in 1933. The film was directed by Michael Curtiz and starred William Powell as Philo Vance, reprising the role after appearing as Vance in three earlier films for Paramount, and Mary Astor as Hilda Lake, the victims' niece. Many film historians (including William K. Everson, who pronounced it a "masterpiece" in the August 1984 issue of Films in Review) consider it one of the greatest screen adaptations of a Golden Age mystery novel, and rank it with the 1946 film Green for Danger.

The Kennel Murder Case was remade by Warners in 1940 as Calling Philo Vance, with James Stephenson as Vance and William Clemens directing. World War II-era espionage stood in for the skulduggery of the art world in the remake.

== Literary significance and criticism ==
According to the 1936 introduction to the novel, in the omnibus Philo Vance Murder Cases, the two halves were written nearly a year apart. Several real-life friends of author S. S. Van Dine appear as themselves in the second half of the novel.

"Though dogs can be dangerous in life and in detection, this imbroglio by the precious and pedantic Van Dine is rather better than the rest of those written after 1930. It is a locked-room murder, there are clues, and Vance is not obnoxious beyond endurance."

== Release details ==
- 1932, U.S., Cosmopolitan, serialized November 1932 – February 1933
- 1933, U.S., Charles Scribner's Sons, (ISBN none), Pub date 1933, Hardcover (first edition)
- 1946, U.S., Bantam, (ISBN none), publication date October 1946, first paperback edition
- 1984, U.S., Macmillan, (ISBN 0-684-18248-3), Pub date September 1, 1984, Paperback
