= The Dragon Murder Case =

1934 novel by S.S. Van Dine

- First edition
- Author: S. S. Van Dine
- Language: English
- Series: Philo Vance
- Genre: Mystery fiction
- Publisher: Scribners (USA) & Cassell (UK)
- Publication date: 1934
- Publication place: United States
- Media type: Print (hardback & paperback)
- Pages: 311
- Preceded by: The Kennel Murder Case
- Followed by: The Casino Murder Case

The Dragon Murder Case (first published in 1934) is a novel in a series by S. S. Van Dine about fictional detective Philo Vance. It was also adapted to a film version in 1934, starring Warren William as Vance.

== Plot ==
A guest at an estate in northern Manhattan (Inwood Hill Park) dives into the swimming pool and disappears. His murder brings up references to a mythological dragon which is said to prey on the imprudent, but Philo Vance uses his knowledge of both dragons and criminals to demonstrate whodunit.

== Background ==
The estate in the novel was based on Tryon Hall, built in 1907 by C. K. G. Billings, a retired president of the Chicago Coke and Gas Company. In 1917 he sold the mansion to John D. Rockefeller Jr. The mansion burned down in 1926, and Rockefeller developed the property, and others, into Fort Tryon Park, which he then donated to New York City.

== Literary significance and criticism ==
The Dragon Murder Case is the seventh novel featuring Van Dine's Philo Vance character. Some critics saw this as marking a significant change in the series, including crime novelist Julian Symons who wrote, "The decline in the last six Vance books is so steep that the critic who called the ninth of them 'one more stitch in his literary shroud' was not overstating the case." Further unfavorable critiques from culture historian Jacques Barzun noted, "The estate and its denizens are meant to be as picturesque as the persons and the plot, but all succeed only in being as egregious and improbable as Philo Vance and his antics. This tale is one of the author's worst ..."
