= Cock Robin =

English nursery rhyme

"Who Killed Cock Robin"
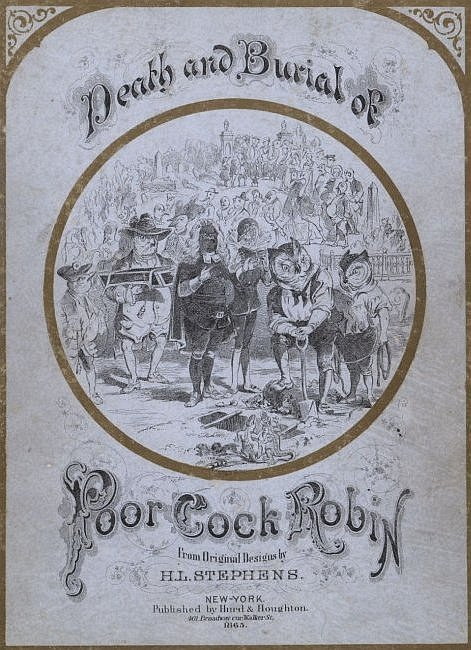
- Cover of Death and Burial of Poor Cock Robin, by Henry Louis Stephens, 1865.

Nursery rhyme
- Published: c. 1744
- Songwriter: Unknown

"Who Killed Cock Robin" is an English-origin folk song and nursery rhyme. It has a Roud Folk Song Index number of 494.

== Lyrics ==
The earliest record of the rhyme is in Tommy Thumb's Pretty Song Book, published in 1744, which noted only the first four verses. The extended version given below was not printed until c. 1770.

Who killed Cock Robin?
I, said the Sparrow,
with my bow and arrow,
I killed Cock Robin.
Who saw him die?
I, said the Fly,
with my little teeny eye,
I saw him die.
Who caught his blood?
I, said the Fish,
With my little dish
I caught his blood.
Who'll make the shroud?
I, said the Beetle,
with my thread and needle,
I'll make the shroud.
Who'll dig his grave?
I, said the Owl,
with my pick and trowel,
I'll dig his grave.
Who'll be the parson?
I, said the Rook,
with my little book,
I'll be the parson.
Who'll be the clerk?
I, said the Lark,
if it's not in the dark,
I'll be the clerk.
Who'll carry the link?
I, said the Linnet,
I'll fetch it in a minute,
I'll carry the link.
Who'll be chief mourner?
I, said the Dove,
I mourn for my love,
I'll be chief mourner.
Who'll carry the coffin?
I, said the Kite,
if it's not through the night,
I'll carry the coffin.
Who'll bear the pall?
We, said the Wren,
both the cock and the hen,
We’ll bear the pall.
Who'll sing a psalm?
I, said the Thrush,
as she sat on a bush,
I'll sing a psalm.
Who'll toll the bell?
I, said the Bull,
because I can pull,
I'll toll the bell.
All the birds of the air
fell a-sighing and a-sobbing,
when they heard the bell toll
for poor Cock Robin.

The rhyme also has an alternative ending, in which the sparrow who killed Cock Robin is hanged for his crime. Several early versions picture a stocky, strong-billed bullfinch tolling the bell, which may have been the original intention of the rhyme.

== Origin and meaning ==
Although the earliest known record of the song is from the mid-eighteenth century, there is some evidence that it is much older. The death of a robin by an arrow is depicted in a 15th-century stained glass window at Buckland Rectory, Gloucestershire.

A similar fragmentary rhyme appears in the collected grammatical miscellany of 15th-century schoolmaster, Thomas Schort, which reads:

Y say a sparw
Schotte an arow
By an harow
Into a barow

The rhyme is also similar to a poem, Phyllyp Sparowe, written by John Skelton about 1508, in which the narrator laments the death of his pet bird. The use of the rhyme 'owl' with 'shovel' could suggest that it was originally used in older middle English pronunciation. Versions of the story appear to exist in other countries, including Germany.

A number of theories have been advanced to explain the meaning of the rhyme:

- The rhyme records a mythological event, such as the death of the god Balder from Norse mythology, or the ritual sacrifice of a king figure, as proposed by early folklorists as in the 'Cutty Wren' theory of a 'pagan survival'.
- It is a parody of the death of King William II, who was killed by an arrow while hunting in the New Forest (Hampshire) in 1100, and who was known as William Rufus, meaning "red".
- The rhyme is connected with the fall of Robert Walpole's government in 1742, since Robin is a diminutive form of Robert and the first printing is close to the time of the events mentioned.

All of these theories are based on perceived similarities in the text to legendary or historical events, or on the similarities of names. Peter Opie pointed out that an existing rhyme could have been adapted to fit the circumstances of political events in the eighteenth century.

The theme of Cock Robin's death as well as the poem's distinctive cadence have become archetypes, much used in literary fiction and other works of art, from poems, to murder mysteries, to cartoons. Examples include the 1929 crime novel The Bishop Murder Case by S.S. Van Dine, The Death of Cock Robin (watercolour) by John Anster Fitzgerald (Victoria and Albert Museum), the poem Leaves (from Season Songs 1975) by Ted Hughes, the final movement Who'll Toll the Bell? from Peter Seabourne's piano work Steps Volume 8: My Song in October, and the cartoon Who Killed Cock Robin, a Silly Symphonies animated short film from 1935 by United Artists, produced by Walt Disney.
