= The Winter Murder Case =

Philo Vance novella (1939)

- First edition
- Author: S. S. Van Dine
- Language: English
- Series: Philo Vance
- Genre: Mystery
- Publisher: Charles Scribner's Sons
- Publication date: 1939
- Publication place: United States
- Media type: Print (hardback & paperback)
- Pages: 174 pp
- Preceded by: The Gracie Allen Murder Case

The Winter Murder Case (1939) is a Philo Vance novella that S. S. Van Dine intended to expand into his twelfth full-length book, a project cut short by his death. The Winter Murder Case seems especially similar to the B mystery movies of the 1930s, a cross between Van Dine's usual style and the film style. It was intended as a vehicle for Sonja Henie.

Van Dine's last two books were intended as Hollywood scenarios. Both are shorter than his typical novels.

== Literary significance and criticism ==
"The decline in the last six Vance books is so steep that the critic who called the ninth of them one more stitch in his literary shroud was not overstating the case." wrote Julian Symons in Bloody Murder.

"This is [Van Dine's] last work, left in an only semi-expanded outline form at the time of his death. Philo Vance is still the detective but the pseudo-scholarly footnotes are not in evidence nor is the pearl-handled telephone. In fact, this short book is pleasant reading; add your own nostalgia if you wish.", according to Jacques Barzun and Wendell Hertig Taylor in A Catalogue of Crime.
