= The Benson Murder Case =

1926 novel by S. S. Van Dine

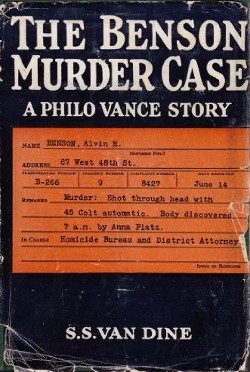
- First edition (US)
- Author: S. S. Van Dine
- Language: English
- Series: Philo Vance
- Genre: Mystery
- Publisher: Ernest Benn (UK) & Scribner's (US)
- Publication date: 1926
- Publication place: United States
- Media type: Print (hardback & paperback)
- Followed by: The Canary Murder Case
- Text: The Benson Murder Case at Wikisource

The Benson Murder Case is the first novel in the Philo Vance series of mystery novels by S. S. Van Dine, and became a best-seller after its 1926 publication.

== Plot outline ==
New York dilettante Philo Vance decides to assist the police in investigating the death of another man-about-town because he finds the psychological aspects of the crime of interest, and feels that they would be beyond the capacities of the police, even those of his friend District Attorney Markham. Vance investigates the circumstances under which the body was found and reconstructs the crime sufficiently to determine that the murderer is five feet, ten and a half inches in height. Together, Vance and Markham investigate Benson's business associates and romantic interests until Vance manages to pierce the murderer's alibi for the time of the murder and force a confession.

== Literary significance and criticism ==
The novel was very loosely based upon a real-life case that had made headlines, the unsolved 1920 murder of bridge expert Joseph Bowne Elwell. It was considered a roman à clef because the circumstances under which Elwell's body was found—he was shot to death in a room in his home which was found to be locked from the inside, and he was not wearing his toupee—are duplicated in the novel. Modern knowledge of ballistics reveals that one of the central premises of the novel is fanciful, because the reconstruction of the height of the murderer is impossible (Dashiell Hammett had said as much at the time, in a 1927 book review).

"The first and best, partly because Van Dine had the real-life model of the Joseph Elwell murder (1920) to hold his fancy in check."

"Vance spots the murderer almost immediately but doesn't reveal him, allowing Markham and Sergeant Heath to fix the guilt on five successive persons by circumstantial evidence."

== Film adaptations ==
Paramount Pictures released The Benson Murder Case (1930), a film version directed by Frank Tuttle and starring William Powell as Philo Vance. The film bore little resemblance to the plot of the novel. Paramount also released a Spanish-language version, El Cuerpo del Delito, written by Catalan writer Josep Carner Ribalta (1898–1988), and co-directed by Cyril Gardner and A. Washington Pezet.
