= The Benson Murder Case (film) =

1930 American crime film

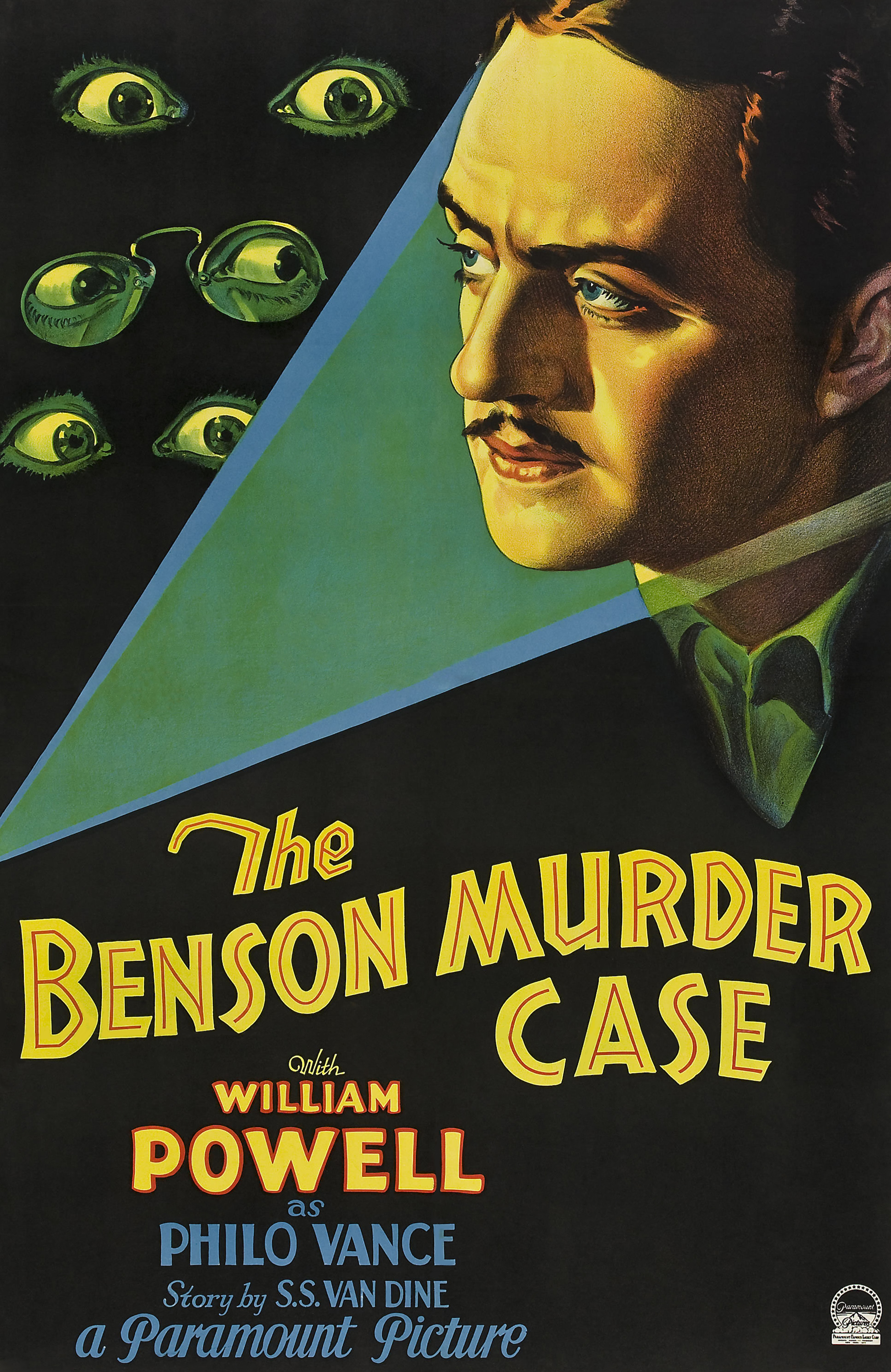
- Theatrical release poster
- Directed by: Frank Tuttle
- Screenplay by: Bartlett Cormack
- Based on: The Benson Murder Case; 1926 novel by S. S. Van Dine
- Produced by: Adolph Zukor; Jesse L. Lasky
- Starring: William Powell; William "Stage" Boyd; Eugene Pallette; Paul Lukas; Natalie Moorhead; Richard Tucker; May Beatty
- Cinematography: Archie Stout
- Edited by: Doris Drought
- Production company: Paramount Pictures
- Distributed by: Paramount Pictures
- Release date: April 11, 1930
- Running time: 65 minutes
- Country: United States
- Language: English

The Benson Murder Case is a 1930 American pre-Code crime film directed by Frank Tuttle and written for the screen by S. S. Van Dine and Bartlett Cormack. The film stars William Powell, William "Stage" Boyd, Eugene Pallette, Paul Lukas, Natalie Moorhead, Richard Tucker and May Beatty. The film was released on April 13, 1930, by Paramount Pictures, and was based on the 1926 novel of the same name by S. S. Van Dine. The film had initial copyright notice, and was renewed in 1957. Under the terms of Title 17 of the U.S. Code, the film will enter the public domain in 2026.

In the film, foppish amateur sleuth Philo Vance (William Powell) takes on a surprise murder investigation when ruthless stockbroker Anthony Benson (Richard Tucker) is found dead at an impromptu party in his lavish country estate which Vance himself attended. As Vance follows the trail of deception, he encounters a cast of shady suspects including the likes of notorious gambler Harry Gray (William 'Stage' Boyd), enigmatic actress Fanny Del Roy (Natalie Moorhead), and mysterious gigolo, Adolph Mohler (Paul Lukas). With the help of tough-talking Sgt. Ernest Heath (Eugene Pallette) and sharp-witted District Attorney John F. X. Markham (E. H. Calvert), Vance navigates a dangerous web of lies, greed, and betrayal to determine who killed Benson.

== Plot ==
The Benson Murder Case (1930)

In the midst of the Wall Street crash of 1929, Anthony Benson, a ruthless stockbroker, is force-selling the unsecured investments of his friends and colleagues on-margin to compensate for the loss of collateral; including those of his affluent and well-connected friend, Harry Gray. In his office, Benson accuses Adolf Mohler, a shallow gigolo, of forging a check to pay for a trinket that he put on-loan for one of his lovers, Mrs. Paula Banning. Fanny Del Roy, an actress and Mohler's other lover, learns that Benson force-sold her investments as well, after she teased his feelings for her. Fanny insists that she was going to give Benson her pearls as collateral to secure her account, who curiously already has them. Paula arrives, and is also disappointed when she finds she was sold out. Harry Gray indirectly learns of his loss in the stock market through Benson's force-selling, as well; costing him over $250k. Benson orders all of them out of his office, and makes plans to spend the night at his luxurious country estate. The three departing his office overhear this. Benson invites Gray to stay the night with him, apologizing for his stock losses.

Later that night at the lodge, Benson and Gray are joined, one-by-one, by the group that confronted him in his office. Benson's neighbor, District Attorney John Markham, and his friend, Philo Vance, stop by as well. Gray, aware of Vance's amateur sleuthing efforts, says that Vance could never cope with a murder done by a professional gunman; insisting that Vance got lucky on his previous case. During their conversation, a loud gunshot is heard upstairs, and Benson, who had excused himself upstairs, tumbles down the central staircase, dead.

The next morning, Vance shows attending Police Sergeant, Ernest Heath, a Derringer that was found at the top of the stairs. Coroner Dr. Doremus determines that an unaware Benson was shot in the heart from six-feet away around midnight; leaving no shell residue. Sgt. Heath shows Vance Fanny's empty jewel case, itself wrapped in a paper with Mohler's name on it. Vance meets Gray at his hotel room and asks him for a way to inspect Mohler's hotel room, who suggests a stool pigeon. Vance is surprised by the presence of Benson's former valet, Albert Brecker (Mischa Auer), who's now working for Gray.

After interrogating Fanny, Mohler, and Paula, Markham learns that Mohler had given Benson a jewel case borrowed from Fanny as security for the $10k he owed Benson. Fanny corrects this, as Mohler had bought them for her using Paula's money, then stole them the day after. As Markham mulls over indicting Fanny on-suspicion for her checkered past with Benson, Vance suggests that they further inspect Benson's weskit.

On the car ride to the morgue, Markham is shot in the shoulder through Vance's window, who quickly deduces that the shot was meant for him. Later, as Markham is recuperating at Vance's apartment, the latter sets up to have a policewoman go undercover as a maid at the hotel of which Mohler and Gray are staying. Vance meets the ballistics expert, who determines that the bullets used for Markham and Benson are identical, and that the derringer used could have been fitted with a rare suppressor. Back at Vance's apartment, Sgt. Heath arrives and gives Vance the empty jewel case. Inside it, he finds that it contains a photograph of Fanny and her daughter on her sixth birthday. A policeman brings Vance a piece of cut twine found at Benson's estate, who demonstrates to Sgt. Heath that it burns slowly. News of Paula's confession reach the apartment. Vance, after hearing out Paula's story, asks her for a hairpin and arranges to meet everyone back at the Benson estate shortly before 6 PM; bringing along a copy of Mohler's fingerprints.

At the estate, Vance singles out Gray for wanting revenge on Benson after selling him out in the stock market. Accosted, Gray reminds him that he was in the kitchen making coffee when Benson had gone upstairs. Vance agrees, but points out that the coffee was overdone. Mohler objects, swearing that he had made coffee that night. Vance confirms that only Mohler's fingerprint was found on the coffee can. Vance deduces that Gray had slipped upstairs and killed Benson in his bedroom using a custom-suppressed Derringer before meeting him and Markham downstairs. Gray denies this, reminding Vance of the gunshot heard just before Benson fell down the stairs.

At 6 PM, said gunshot is heard once again, and a dummy falls down the central staircase. This was set up by Vance, who informs the group that Benson's corpse was supported at the top of the stairs by the twine that Gray had cut from a sack in the liquor cellar. Vance determines that Paula had been asleep, due to an identical hairpin and body imprint being found in her upstairs bed, and that Mohler and Fanny were privately discussing the stolen pearls, allowing Gray to set up the scene. Vance re-demonstrates Benson's explosive handheld burglar alarms to the group, and suggests that Gray had tied one to, then set fire to the twine supporting Benson; with it dropping said alarm, making a bang, just before the corpse tumbled down the stairs.

Gray scoffs at Vance's lack of proof. However, Vance produces the suit jacket that Gray wore on the night of the murder, courtesy of the policewoman, and finds fibers from a piece of twine in its front pocket. Gray, still unconvinced, is finally outsmarted when Vance shows the group the custom suppressor that Gray had fitted to the Derringer, also found in his hotel room by the policewoman. Gray, admitting defeat, slugs the arresting officer and darts upstairs, shooting at Sgt. Heath before being gunned down.

== Cast ==
- William Powell as Philo Vance
- William "Stage" Boyd as Harry Gray
- Eugene Pallette as Sgt. Ernest Heath
- Paul Lukas as Adolph Mohler
- Natalie Moorhead as Fanny Del Roy
- Richard Tucker as Anthony Benson
- May Beatty as Mrs. Paula Banning
- E.H. Calvert as Dist. Atty. John F. X. Markham
- Mischa Auer as Albert Brecker
- Guy Oliver as Captain Hagedorn (uncredited)
