= The Gracie Allen Murder Case =

1938 novel by S.S. Van Dine

- First edition
- Author: S. S. Van Dine
- Language: English
- Series: Philo Vance
- Genre: Mystery, detective, comedy
- Publisher: Charles Scribner's
- Publication date: 1938
- Publication place: United States
- Media type: Print (hardback & paperback)
- Pages: 227 pp
- Preceded by: The Kidnap Murder Case
- Followed by: The Winter Murder Case

The Gracie Allen Murder Case (1938) (also published as The Scent of Murder) is the eleventh of twelve detective novels by S. S. Van Dine featuring his famous fictional detective of the 1920s and 1930s, Philo Vance. It also features the zany half of the Burns and Allen comedy team. It is in some ways a roman à clef, including not just Burns and Allen but also such characters as Gracie's mother and brother. (George Burns, after all, has described the couple's act as, "All I had to do was ask, 'Gracie, how's your brother?' and she talked for 38 years.") That gave the book an unusual feel, as did the comic tone of much of Gracie's dialogue. This tone suddenly shifts in a later chapter to one character's philosophically anguished speculations, and then back again to Gracie.

== Literary significance and criticism ==
For some readers the whole thing works oddly wonderfully, and shows S. S. Van Dine's skill at combining his traditional approach with some unusual forms. Other readers found this book both disconcerting and disappointing. It did not enjoy anything near the commercial success of Van Dine's earlier novels (or his prime character, when Philo Vance himself was developed into a classic radio show), and most critics considered it a failure.

Those critics might have agreed with the protagonist herself. In classic Gracie style, when Van Dine was working on the novel, Allen quipped, "S.S. Van Dine is silly to spend six months writing a novel when you can buy one for two dollars and ninety-eight cents."

Crime novelist and critic Julian Symons wrote, "The decline in the last six Vance books is so steep that the critic who called the ninth of them one more stitch in his literary shroud was not overstating the case."

== Film adaptation ==
The novel was adapted into a 1939 film starring Gracie Allen (who received billing above Warren William's portrayal of Philo Vance), which was fairly faithful to the novel. The action stops in the first third when Gracie sings a song that at first seems to be her attempt to sing the first lines of a number of popular songs, each to the tune of another—a novelty song. The film focuses more on her humor than the murder plot, and Philo Vance, whom Gracie keeps calling "Fido" in the film, is relegated to a decidedly secondary role.
