= The Pretenders (play) =

Play by Henrik Ibsen

The Pretenders (original Norwegian title: Kongs-Emnerne) is a dramatic play by Norwegian playwright Henrik Ibsen.

== Play overview ==
The Pretenders was written in bursts during 1863, but Ibsen claimed to have had sources and the idea in 1858. It is a five-act play in prose set in the thirteenth century. The play opened at the old Christiania Theatre on 19 January 1864. The plot revolves around the historical conflict between Norwegian King Håkon Håkonsson and his father-in-law, Earl Skule Bårdsson. It has been commonly ascribed to the rivalry between Ibsen and Bjørnstjerne Bjørnson, who had succeeded Ibsen as director of the Norske Theater in 1857.

== List of characters ==
- Håkon Håkonsson, King-elect of Norway
- Inga of Varteig, Håkon's mother
- Earl Skule Bårdsson, Norwegian nobleman and future father-in-law of Håkon
- Lady Ragnhild, Skule's wife
- Sigrid, Skule's sister
- Margaret, Skule's daughter and Håkon's future wife
- Guthorm Ingesson
- Sigurd Ribbung
- Nikolas Arnesson, Bishop of Oslo
- Dagfinn the Peasant, Håkon's Marshal
- Ivar Bodde, Haakon's Chaplain
- Vegard Vaeradal, one of his bodyguard
- Gregorius Jonsson, a nobleman
- Paul Flida, a nobleman
- Ingebjorg, wife of Anders Skialdarband
- Peter, her son, a young priest
- Sira Viljam, house chaplain to Bishop Nikolas
- Master Sigard of Brabant, a physician
- Jatgeir, an Icelandic poet
- Baard Bratte, a chieftain from near Trondheim

== Historic background ==
Håkon Håkonsson reigned as king of Norway from 1217 to 1263. In the earlier part of the reign of King Håkon, much of the royal power was in the hands of Skule Bårdsson. In 1225, Håkon married Skule's daughter Margaret Skulesdatter. The relationship between the two became strained as Håkon asserted his power. In 1239, the conflict between the two erupted into open warfare when Skule had himself proclaimed king. The rebellion ended in 1240 when Skule was put to death. This rebellion and the death of Skule are generally taken to mark the end of the Civil war era in Norway which had dated from 1130.

== Translations ==
This play was translated into English by Scottish writer and critic William Archer as a part of his publication, Henrik Ibsen's Prose Dramas Vol III. This volume consisted of Lady Inger of Östrat (Fru Inger til Østeraad), The Vikings at Helgeland (Hærmændene paa Helgeland), and The Pretenders (Kongs-Emnerne). It was published by The Walter Scott Company, London in 1890.

This play was translated into Welsh (as Yr Ymhonwyr) by T. Gwynn Jones, and performed to an audience of 10,000 at the 1927 Holyhead National Eisteddfod. The production was part of the national drama movement in Wales, funded by Baron Howard de Walden.
