= The Greene Murder Case (film) =

1929 film

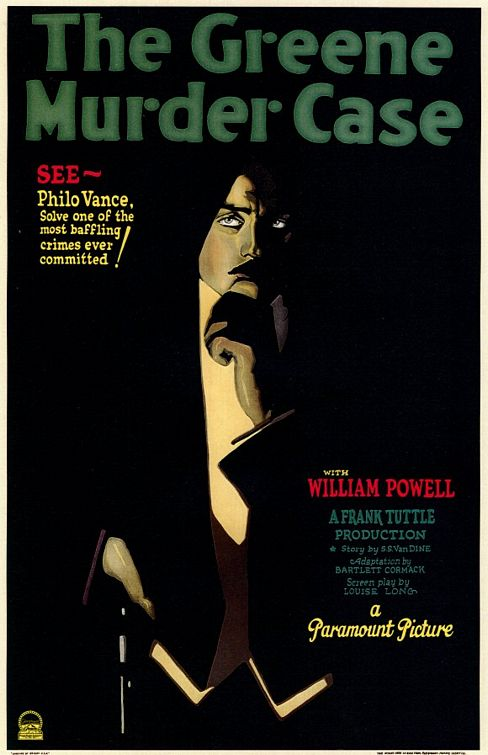
- Theatrical release poster
- Directed by: Frank Tuttle
- Written by: Louise Long (screenplay); Richard H. Digges Jr. (intertitles,silent version)
- Based on: The Greene Murder Case; 1928 novel by S.S. Dine
- Produced by: B. P. Schulberg
- Starring: William Powell; Florence Eldridge; Jean Arthur
- Cinematography: Henry W. Gerrard
- Edited by: Verna Willis
- Music by: Karl Hajos
- Production company: Paramount Pictures
- Distributed by: Paramount Pictures
- Release date: August 11, 1929
- Running time: 69 minutes
- Country: United States
- Language: English

The Greene Murder Case (1929)

The Greene Murder Case is a 1929 American pre-Code mystery film directed by Frank Tuttle and stars William Powell in his second Philo Vance outing, Florence Eldridge, and Jean Arthur. It is produced and released on August 11, 1929, by Paramount Pictures and based on the novel The Greene Murder Case, by S.S. Van Dine (Willard Huntington Wright). The novel had been published a year before this film was made.

In 1937, the film was remade as Night of Mystery.

== Plot ==
The Greenes are a wealthy and dysfunctional family who are forced to gather annually to fulfil the stipulations of the late patriarch's will. The family is ruled by the resentful and ailing Mrs. Tobias Greene, who holds little affection for her children, Rex, Chester, and daughter Sibella. The children despise each other, while adopted daughter Ada is excluded from the inheritance due to her non-blood relation. The tension within the household is palpable, with suspicions surrounding Sibella's indiscreet affair with the family's doctor, Arthur Von Blon, and rumors that Mrs. Greene's infirmity may not be as severe as it seems. The Greene family's servants, including butler Sproot, housekeeper Gertrude Mannheim, and devout Hemming, also harbor their own doubts. When members of the family start being murdered, District Attorney John F.-X Markham enlists the help of amateur detective Philo Vance, who, alongside Sergeant Ernest Heath, must sift through the animosity and hidden motives to unmask the killer.

== Cast ==
- William Powell as Philo Vance
- Florence Eldridge as Sibella Greene
- Ullrich Haupt, Sr. as Dr. Arthur Von Blon
- Jean Arthur as Ada Greene
- Eugene Pallette as Sgt. Ernest Heath
- E. H. Calvert as District Attorney John F.-X Markham
- Gertrude Norman as Mrs. Tobias Greene
- Lowell Drew as Chester Greene
- Morgan Farley as Rex Greene
- Brandon Hurst as Sproot
- Augusta Burmeister as Mrs. Gertrude Mannheim
- Marcia Harris as Hemming

== See also ==
- List of early sound feature films (1926–1929)
