= S. S. Van Dine =

American journalist and author (1888–1939)

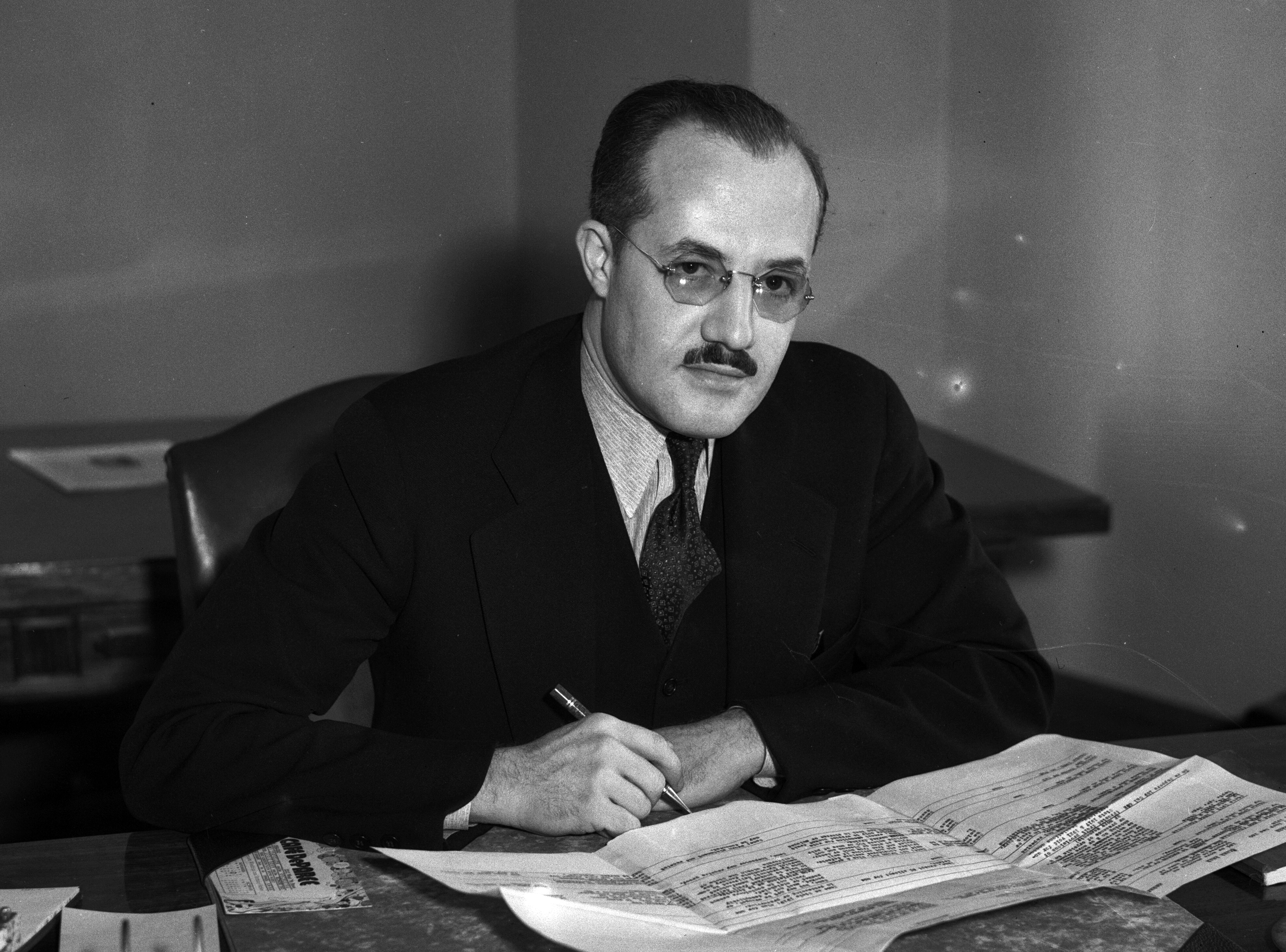
- Wright in the 1930s
- Born: Willard Huntington Wright; October 15, 1888; Charlottesville, Virginia, U.S.
- Died: April 11, 1939 (aged 50); New York City, U.S.
- Known for: Art criticism, Detective novels featuring Philo Vance
- Spouse(s): Katharine Belle Boynton (1907–1930); Eleanor Rulapaugh, aka Claire De Lisle (1930–his death)
- Relatives: Stanton Macdonald-Wright (brother)

S. S. Van Dine (also styled S.S. Van Dine) is the pen name used by American art critic Willard Huntington Wright (October 15, 1888 – April 11, 1939) when he wrote detective novels. Wright was active in avant-garde cultural circles in pre–World War I New York, and under the pen name (which he originally used to conceal his identity) he created the fictional detective Philo Vance, a sleuth and aesthete who first appeared in novels, starting with The Benson Murder Case (1926), then in films and on the radio.

== Early life ==
Willard Huntington Wright was born to Archibald Davenport Wright and Annie Van Vranken Wright on October 15, 1888, in Charlottesville, Virginia. His younger brother, Stanton Macdonald-Wright, became a respected painter, one of the first American abstract artists, and co-founder (with Morgan Russell) of the school of modern art known as "Synchromism". Willard and Stanton were raised in Santa Monica, California, where their father owned a hotel. Willard, a largely self-taught writer, attended St. Vincent College, Pomona College, and Harvard University without graduating. In 1907, he married Katharine Belle Boynton of Seattle, Washington; they had one child, Beverley. He abandoned Katherine and Beverley early in their marriage. Katharine was granted a divorce in October 1930. he married for a second time in October 1930. His second wife was Eleanor Rulapaugh, known professionally as Claire De Lisle, a portrait painter and socialite.

== Writing career ==
At age 21, Wright began his professional writing career as literary editor of the Los Angeles Times, where – describing himself as "'Esthetic expert and psychological shark" – he was known for his scathing book reviews and irreverent opinions. He was particularly caustic about romance and detective fiction. His friend and mentor H.L. Mencken was an early inspiration. Other important literary influences included Oscar Wilde and Ambrose Bierce. Wright was an advocate of the naturalism of Theodore Dreiser, and Wright's own novel, The Man of Promise (1916), was written in a similar style.

In 1909, Wright wrote a perceptive profile of Edgar Allan Poe for the Los Angeles Times. Wright moved to New York City in 1911. He published realist fiction as editor of the New York literary magazine The Smart Set, from 1912 to 1914, a job he attained with Mencken's help. He was fired from that position when the magazine's conservative owner felt that Wright was intentionally provoking their middle-class readership with his interest in unconventional and often sexually explicit fiction. In his two-year tenure, Wright published short stories by Gabriele D'Annunzio, Floyd Dell, Ford Madox Ford, D.H. Lawrence, and George Moore; a play by Joseph Conrad; and poems by Ezra Pound and William Butler Yeats.

In 1913, he visited Paris and Munich, seeing Impressionist and Synchromist works of art. He wrote an article about the art, Impressionism to Synchromism, December 1913, published in New York magazine, which brought the abstract art to public attention in the US.

Wright's many projects reflected his wide range of interests. His book What Nietzsche Taught appeared in 1915. An attempt to popularize the German philosopher with skeptical American audiences, it described and commented on all of Nietzsche's books and provided quotations from each work. Wright continued to write short stories in this period; in 2012, Brooks Hefner revealed heretofore unknown short stories that featured an intellectual criminal, written by Wright under a pseudonym several years before his adoption of the Van Dine pseudonym.

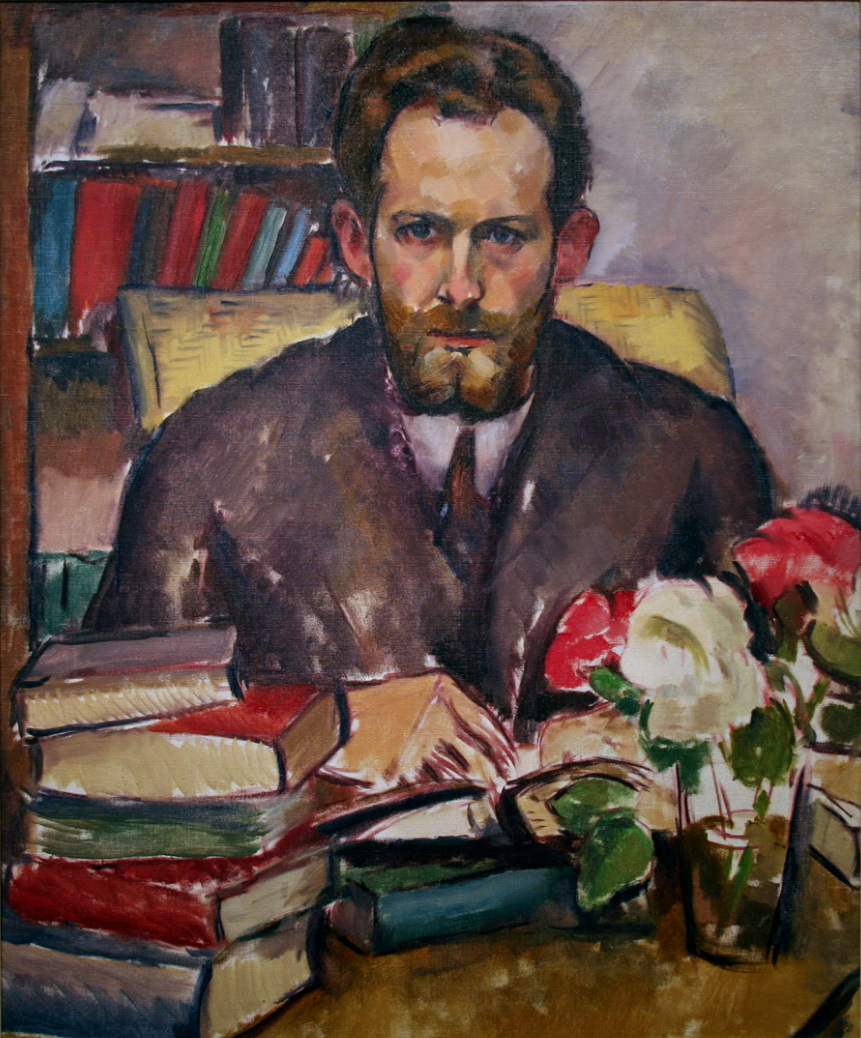
Portrait of Wright by his brother (and co-author) Stanton Macdonald-Wright, 1914.

Wright was, however, most respected in intellectual circles for his writing about art. In Modern Painting: Its Tendency and Meaning (secretly co-authored in 1915 with his brother Stanton), he surveyed the important art movements of the last hundred years from Manet to Cubism, praised the largely unknown work of Cézanne, and predicted a coming era in which an art of color abstraction would replace realism. Admired by Alfred Stieglitz and Georgia O'Keeffe among others, Wright became under his brother's tutelage one of the most progressive (and belligerently opinionated) art critics of the time and helped to organize several shows, including the "Forum Exhibition of Modern American Painters", bringing the most advanced new painters to the attention of audiences on both coasts. He also published a work of aesthetic philosophy, The Creative Will (1916), that O'Keeffe and William Faulkner both regarded as a meaningful influence on their thinking about artistic identity.

In 1917, Wright published Misinforming a Nation, in which he mounted a blistering attack on alleged inaccuracies and British biases in the Encyclopædia Britannica Eleventh Edition. A Germanophile, Wright did not support America's decision to join the Allied cause in World War I, and he was blackballed from journalism for more than two years after an overzealous secretary (erroneously) accused him of spying for Germany, an episode that became a much-publicized scandal in New York in November 1917. Though cleared, his favourable view of Prussian militarism cost him his friendships with Mencken and Dreiser. In 1929, at the height of his fame as 'Philo Vance', he was appointed Police Commissioner of Bradley Beach, New Jersey. After suffering a nervous breakdown and the beginning of a long-term dependence on drugs, Wright retreated to California, where he attempted to make a living as a newspaper columnist in San Francisco. Contrary to what is stated in some sources, Wright did write a biography of the poet Richard Hovey and it was announced for publication in Spring 1914. In 1929, Wright stated that "It is true that at one time I was working on a book relating to Richard Hovey and his friends but Mrs Hovey died before the book went to press, and it has never been published"; that remains the case.

== Detective fiction ==
Returning to New York in 1920, Wright took any freelance work that came his way but lived a restless, impoverished existence and, in his displays of temper and anxiety, alienated many of his old friends. By 1923, he was seriously ill, the result of a breakdown from overwork, he claimed, but in reality the consequence of his secret cocaine addiction, according to John Loughery's biography Alias S.S. Van Dine. Confined to bed for a prolonged period of recovery, he began in frustration and boredom reading hundreds of volumes of crime and detection. As a direct result of this exhaustive study, he wrote a seminal essay, published in 1926, which explored the history, traditions and conventions of detective fiction as an art form. Wright also decided to try his own hand at detective fiction and approached Maxwell Perkins, the famous Scribner's editor whom he had known at Harvard, with an outline for a trilogy that would feature an affluent, snobbish amateur sleuth, a Jazz Age Manhattan setting, and lively topical references. In 1926, the first Philo Vance book, The Benson Murder Case, was published under the pseudonym "S.S. Van Dine". Within two years, following the publication of The Canary Murder Case and The Greene Murder Case, Wright was one of the best-selling authors in the United States.

Frankly embarrassed by his turn from intellectual pursuits to mass market fiction, Wright never wanted to publish under his own name. He took his pseudonym from the abbreviation of "steamship" and from Van Dine, which he claimed was an old family name. According to Loughery, however, "there are no Van Dines evident in the family tree" (p. 176). He wrote twelve mysteries in total, though their author's identity was unmasked by 1928. The first few books about the distinctive Philo Vance (who shared with his creator a love of art and a disdain for the common touch) sold many copies, leading Wright to become wealthy for the first time in his life. His readership was diverse and worldwide. David Shavit's study of World War II POW reading habits revealed that Vance was one of the favorite detectives among officer POWs. However, according to critic Julian Symons:

[Van Dine's] fate is curiously foreshadowed in that of Stanford West, the hero of his only [non-crime] novel, who sells out by abandoning the unpopular work in which he searched for "a sound foundation of culture and aristocracy" and becoming a successful novelist. The title of an article Wright penned at the height of his fame, "I Used to be a Highbrow but Look at Me Now," reflects both his pleasure in his newfound fame and his regret that he would never again be regarded as a serious writer.

Wright's later books declined in both quality and popularity. The reading public's tastes changed, and the "hard-boiled" school of detective fiction became the dominant style in the 1930s. The new mood was captured by Ogden Nash in his brief verse:

Philo Vance
Needs a kick in the pance.

Philo Vance and Sam Spade occupy different aesthetic universes. Wright continued to make money, though, and by the end of the decade, he saw himself caught in a trap from which he could not escape: in the midst of the Great Depression, he could not return to literary journalism and art criticism which paid very little, now that he and his wife were accustomed to an extravagant way of life, and yet he no longer believed in the kind of novels he was producing each year in order to maintain that way of life.

== Study of detective fiction ==
Wright's lengthy introduction and notes to the anthology The World's Great Detective Stories (1927) are important in the history of the critical study of detective fiction. Although dated by the passage of time, this essay is still a core around which many other such commentaries have been constructed. He also wrote an article, "Twenty Rules for Writing Detective Stories", in 1928 for The American Magazine It has been frequently reprinted and compared to "Knox's (Ten) Commandments" by Ronald Knox.

== Short film series ==
Wright wrote scenarios for Warner Brothers film studio in the early 1930s. These were used as the basis for a series of 12 two-reel "murder mystery" films, each approximately 20 minutes long, which were released in 1931–1932.

Donald Meek (as Dr. Crabtree) and John Hamilton (as Inspector Carr) were featured players, with Joseph Henabery directing. Three titles (The Wall Street Mystery, The Studio Murder Mystery, and the Trans-Atlantic Murder Mystery) have been released on DVD as extras on Forbidden Hollywood Collection Volume 3 (Warner).

As far as it is known, none of Van Dine's screen treatments has been published in book form, and none of the manuscripts survive. Short films were a common part of theatre screenings at the time, and Hollywood made hundreds of them during the studio era.

On 13 September 1932, a $500,000 plagiarism suit was filed against Van Dine and the Vitaphone Film Company by Arlo Channing Edington and Carmen Ballen Edington, who charged that their novel, The Studio Murder Mystery, which had been filmed by Paramount in 1929, had been "'lifted' – title, plot and incident" and produced by the film company, credited to Van Dine. The action was unsuccessful.

== Late career and death ==
From a monetary perspective, Wright was fortunate in his experiences with Hollywood, and he was lionized on his visits to the movie capital. All but two of his novels were adapted as feature-length films, and the role of Philo Vance was played by stars such as William Powell (before his Nick Charles period), Basil Rathbone, and Edmund Lowe. Louise Brooks (in The Canary Murder Case), Jean Arthur (in The Greene Murder Case), and Rosalind Russell (in The Casino Murder Case) appeared in the S.S. Van Dine movies.

On April 11, 1939, at age 50, Wright died in New York of a heart condition exacerbated by excessive drinking, a year after the publication of an unpopular experimental novel incorporating one of the biggest stars in radio comedy, The Gracie Allen Murder Case. He left behind a complete novelette-length story intended for a Sonja Henie film vehicle, which was published posthumously as The Winter Murder Case. Max Perkins generously referred to Wright as a "gallant, gentle man" at the time of his death who had been tormented by the pressures of a market-driven age. His portrait, painted by his brother in 1914, hangs in the permanent collection of the National Portrait Gallery in Washington, D.C.

== Works ==
=== Journalism and reviews ===
As "Willard H. Wright" or Willard Huntington Wright

- "Edgar Allan Poe: His Art, Accomplishments, Influence". Los Angeles Times, January 19, 1909
- "Shockingness of the Real". Los Angeles Times, February 18, 1909
- "Bryce Talks of Problems". Los Angeles Times, March 19, 1909
- "Meredith". Los Angeles Times, May 19, 1909
- "The Uselessness of Art". West Coast Magazine, September 1909
- "View of a Highbrow Anent the Fighting Game". Los Angeles Times, March 20, 1910
- "Hotbed of Soulful Culture, Vortex of Erotic Erudition". Los Angeles Times, May 22, 1910
- "The Gambler's Life in Gay Reno". Los Angeles Times, June 26, 1910
- "Fresh Literature – Books Reviewed". Los Angeles Times, September 11, 1910
- "New Librarian Liberal in Policies, Would Specialise". Los Angeles Times, September 25, 1910
- "Fresh Literature – Books Reviewed". Los Angeles Times
  - September 25, 1910
  - November 6, 1910
  - November 13, 1910
  - November 20, 1910
  - December 4, 1910
  - December 18, 1910,
  - December 25, 1910
  - January 1, 1911
  - March 19, 1911
  - April 30, 1911
  - May 7, 1911
  - May 14, 1911
  - June 11, 1911
  - July 2, 1911
  - July 16, 1911
  - July 23, 1911
  - September 24, 1911
  - October 29, 1911
  - April 28, 1912
- "David Graham Phillips". Los Angeles Times, January 28, 1911
- "Advantage of Stupidity in Dramatic Censorship". Los Angeles Times, April 17, 1911
- "David C McCann". Los Angeles Times, April 24, 1911
- "The New Books and the Book News". Los Angeles Times
  - 12 May 1912
  - 23 June 1912
  - 30 June 1912
  - 26 May 1912
  - 14 July 1912
  - 21 July 1912
  - 4 August 1912
  - 18 August 1912
  - 25 August 1912
  - 22 September 1912
  - 10 November 1912
  - 1 December 1912
  - 22 December 1912
  - 7 March 1913
  - 1 June 1913
  - 8 June 1913
  - 15 June 1913
- The Mission Play. Sunset, July 1912. Abridged and reprinted, Harper's Weekly, July 1912
- Los Angeles – The Chemically Pure. The Smart Set, March 1913. Reprinted: The Smart Set Anthology (1934)
- London's Notorious Supper Clubs. The Smart Set, [Date unknown]. Reprinted: Arizona Republican, November 28, 1913
- The Night Romance of Europe: London. The Smart Set, December 1913
- "He Hopes Our Nation Will Become Nietzschean". New York Tribune, March 26, 1916
- "Flaubert: A Revaluation". North American Review, October 1917
- "Pacificism and Art". Los Angeles Times, November 19, 1917
- "A Pedant on Painting". Los Angeles Times, April 7, 1918
- "New San Francisco – The Prophylactic". Los Angeles Times, August 4, 1918
- "'Woe Is Me' in San Francisco". Los Angeles Times, January 26, 1919
- The Picture That Made Paris Gasp. Hearst's International Magazine, August 1922
- [Title Unknown]. Shadowland Magazine, August 1922
- "The Exacting Art of Caricature". Shadowland Magazine, September 1922
- "The Future of Painting: 1". The Freeman Magazine, December 1922
- "A Strictly American Lexicon". Austin American, May 22, 1928
- [Title Unknown]. New York Evening Mail, May 1934
- "Sleuth-Writer Scouts Gordon Death Theories". Las Vegas Age, April 7, 1931, p. 2.

=== Other non-fiction ===
- "The Mission Pageant at San Gabriel". The Bookman, July 1912
- "Loaf Sugar: A Protest". Minnesota Star Tribune, September 28, 1927
- "New York – Post Impressions". Minnesota Star Tribune, October 6, 1927
- "Twenty Rules for Writing Detective Stories". American Magazine, September 1928, pp. 26–30.
- I Used to Be a Highbrow, But Look at Me Now. American Magazine, September 1928. New York: Scribner, 1929.
- "The Closed Arena". Scribner's Magazine, March 1930, pp. 237–43.

=== Mysteries ===
==== As Albert Otis ====
- "The Wise Guy". Pearson's Magazine, January 1916, pp. 24–31.
- "Full o' Larceny". Pearson's Magazine, February 1916, pp. 118–26.
- "The King's Coup". Pearson's Magazine, March 1916, pp. 203–10.
- "Chivalry". Pearson's Magazine, April 1916, pp. 343–51.
- "The Moon of the East". Pearson's Magazine, May 1916, pp. 453–59.
- "The Scandal of the Louvre". Pearson's Magazine, June 1916, pp. 499–505.
- "A Deal in Contraband". Pearson's Magazine, July 1916, pp. 27–32.
- "An Eye for an Eye". Pearson's Magazine, August 1916, pp. 113–19.

==== As S. S. Van Dine ====
===== Short fiction =====
- "Scarlet Nemesis". Cosmopolitan, January 1929, pp. 52+.
- "A Murder In A Witches' Cauldron". Cosmopolitan, February 1929, pp. 58+.
- "The Man In The Blue Overcoat". Cosmopolitan, May 1929, pp. 32+.
- "The Chorinsky Murder". Cosmopolitan, June 1929, pp. 56+.
- "The Almost Perfect Crime". Cosmopolitan, July 1929, pp. 66–67
- "The Inconvenient Husband". Cosmopolitan, August 1929, pp. 102+.
- "The Bonmartini Murder Case". Cosmopolitan, October 1929, pp. 92+.
- "Fool!" Cosmopolitan, January 1930, pp. 83+.
- "The Clyde Mystery". Illustrated Detective Magazine, July 1932, pp. 44–48.

==== Novels ====
- The Benson Murder Case. New York: Charles Scribner's Sons, 1926
- The Canary Murder Case. New York: Scribners, 1927
- The Greene Murder Case. New York: Scribners, 1928
- The Bishop Murder Case. New York: Scribners, 1929
- The Scarab Murder Case. New York: Scribners, 1930
- The Kennel Murder Case. New York: Scribners, 1933
- The Dragon Murder Case. New York: Scribners, 1933
- The Casino Murder Case. New York: Scribners, 1934
- The Garden Murder Case. New York: Scribners, 1935
- The President's Mystery Story. New York: Farrar and Rinehart, 1935. Co-authored with Rupert Hughes, Samuel Hopkins Adams, Anthony Abbot, Rita Weiman and John Erskine.
- The Kidnap Murder Case. New York: Scribners, 1936
- The Gracie Allen Murder Case. New York: Scribners, 1938 (APA: The Smell of Murder)
- The Winter Murder Case. New York: Scribners, 1939

==== Miscellaneous ====
- Introduction. The Leavenworth Case, by Anna Katharine Green. New York: Modern Age Books, 1937, pp. iv–v.
- Introduction and editor. The World's Great Detective Stories: A Chronological Anthology. New York: Scribners, 1928. Originally issued under Wright's name; reprinted by Blue Ribbon Books as by Van Dine.

=== Scenarios for Warner film shorts ===
The titles are followed by dates reviewed by Film Daily.

- The Clyde Mystery (September 27, 1931). This starred Donald Meek and Helen Flint.
- The Wall Street Mystery (November 4, 1931)
- The Week End Mystery (December 6, 1931). Advertised as The Week-End Mystery
- The Symphony Murder Mystery (January 10, 1932). Advertised as The Symphony Mystery
- The Studio Murder Mystery (February 7, 1932)
- The Skull Murder Mystery (March 1932)
- The Cole Case (The Cole Murder Case) (April 3, 1932)
- Murder in the Pullman (May 22, 1932)
- The Side Show Mystery (June 11, 1932). Advertised as The Sideshow Mystery
- The Campus Mystery (July 2, 1932). This is the only title in the series without Donald Meek.
- The Crane Poison Case (July 9, 1932)
- The Trans-Atlantic Murder Mystery (August 31, 1932). Advertised as The Transatlantic Mystery

=== Parodies ===
- The John Riddell Murder Case. Novel by John Riddell (Corey Ford), 1930

== Poetry ==
- Beside the Sea. The Province, 10 July 1909
- Dedication. The Smart Set, November 1913
- Song against Women. Windsor Star, 14 November 1913
- Ode to Fads of Yesteryear. Vanity Fair, May 1924. Reprinted: Southwest News, 19 June 1924

== Bibliography ==
- Dolmetsch, Carl, ed. (1966). The Smart Set: A History and Anthology. New York: Dial Press.
- Larkin, Mark, "The Philosophy of Crime", Photoplay, April 1929, p. 71. Profile of Van Dine.
- Loughery, John (1992). Alias S.S. Van Dine: The Man Who Created Philo Vance. New York: Scribners.
- South, Will (2001). Color, Myth, and Music: Stanton Macdonald-Wright and Synchromism. Raleigh: North Carolina Museum of Art.
