= The Non-Stop Flight =

1926 film

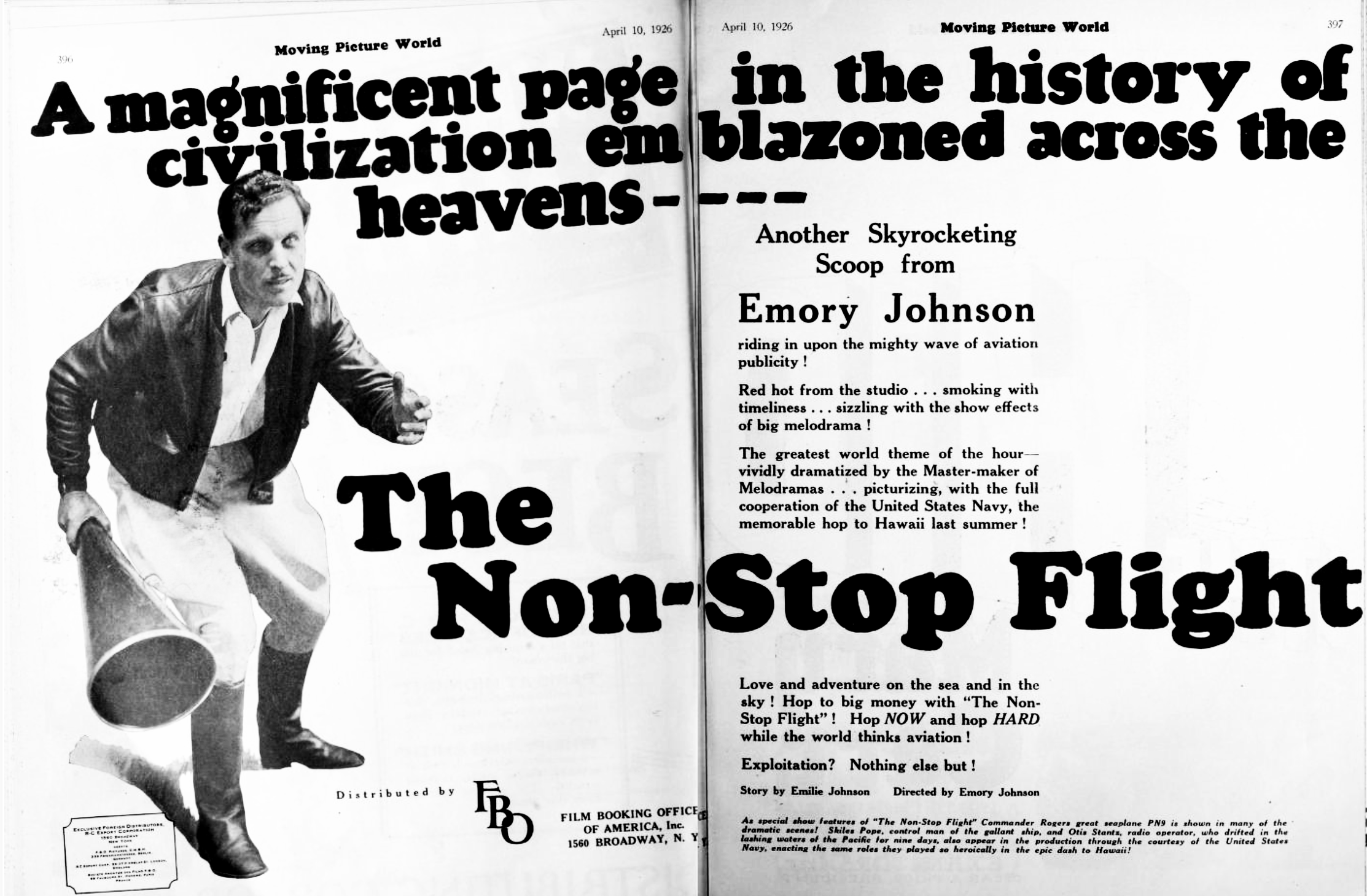
- The Non-Stop Flight Magazine Ad
- Directed by: Emory Johnson; Asst Dir Jerry Callahan
- Written by: Emilie Johnson; Story and Screenplay
- Produced by: Pat Powers; Emory Johnson
- Starring: Knute Erickson; Marcella Daly
- Cinematography: Gilbert Warrenton
- Color process: Black and White
- Distributed by: Film Booking Offices of America
- Release date: March 28, 1926
- Running time: 6 reels 71 minutes
- Country: United States
- Language: Silent (English intertitles)

The Non-Stop Flight is a 1926 American silent melodrama film directed by Emory Johnson. FBO released the film in March 1926. The film's "All-Star" cast included Knute Erickson and Marcella Daly. Emilie Johnson, Johnson's mother, wrote both the story and screenplay. The Non-Stop Flight was the eighth and final film in Johnson's eight-picture contract with FBO.

The film's inspiration was the 1925 U.S. Navy's attempt to fly three twin-engine open-cockpit seaplanes non-stop between San Francisco, California, and Hawaii. One plane, PN-9 No 2, dropped out before the flight started. The second PN-9, No. 3, traveled only 300 miles before being forced to land because of mechanical problems. The remaining PN-9 No. 1 flew 1,800 miles before running into rain squalls and the failure of an anticipated tailwind to materialize. PN-9 No. 1 was off-course and unable to locate a refueling ship. With their fuel supply running low, they made a emergency landing on the ocean. Trapped at sea, the crew built a sail from wing fabric and set out for Hawaii. The US Navy rescues the beleaguered crew nine days later. Even though the flight fell short of its goal, their harrowing adventures captured the imagination and newspaper headlines of the day.

Emilie Johnson built her story around a Swedish ship's Captain - Lars Larson. While he is away at sea, a jealous rival kidnaps his pregnant wife, Anna, and they set sail on his ship. When Larson returns home, he finds Anna missing and their cottage abandoned. He becomes inconsolable, and he turned to a life of crime. He becomes the captain of a tramp steamer smuggling illicit cargo to Mexico. While sailing in the Pacific, his crew discovers an uncharted island. A hermit and a beautiful young woman inhabit the island and are waving a distress flag. A desperate seaplane crew are searching for land and catch sight of the same island. After some discussion, the captain rescues all the island inhabitants and brings them aboard his ship. Once the evacuees are aboard, nefarious circumstances unfold. A free-for-all ensues, with the naval men helping to suppress the riot. The U.S. Navy arrives, a naval officer charms the young women, and all ends well.

== Plot ==
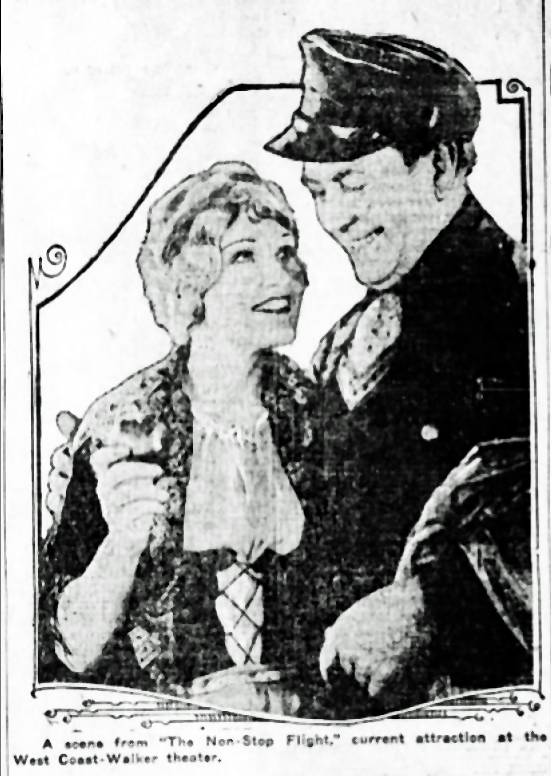
Photograph from The Non-Stop Flight

In Spring 1906, Captain Lars Larson and his wife, Anna, live in a modest cottage nestled in the harbor town of Laholm set on the western edge of Sweden. Anna is expecting their first child. Lars is packing his seabag for his upcoming sea journey. After Lars finishes packing, they leave the house hand-in-hand and walk to the pier. After exchanging goodbyes, Lars remembers a gift he bought for Anna. He gives her a necklace with a cross attached and "Lars" engraved on the crossbeam. He kisses her, then departs. We see a man to the side following the loving exchanges with visible disdain.

Our mystery man is Karl Kruger, skipper of the Steamboat - Gretchen. Karl was a former suitor for Anna's affection. After Lars sets sail, Karl creeps into Larson's cottage and surprises Anna. He tries to have his way, but Anna resists. A frustrated Karl shows a hidden note.

"Dear Karl
I have found the man I love the most
Please forget me"

This note is the original Anna sent Karl after breaking off their earlier relationship. Karl takes the letter and rips off the part that says - Dear Karl. He sticks the remaining piece into a nearby book. Anna screams when she realizes the consequences of Karl's deceit. Lars will believe she has left him for another man. Kruger kidnaps Anna and forces her to board the Gretchen. The boat casts off and heads out to sea.

Captain Larson returns home and finds their home in shambles. Lars discovers the book containing Anna's note. After reading the message, he sobs and then torches the house. Fueled by extreme bitterness, Lars transforms into a drunken ne'er-do-well and becomes a smuggler.

We shift to 1925 - the United States Navy is attempting the first non-stop flight between San Francisco to Hawaii with three Seaplanes. The lead plane will be the PN-9, commanded by Roger Davis, with Lieutenant Jack Connell second in command. Amidst much fanfare, the seaplanes leave for Hawaii. The PN-9 is eight hours into their historic flight. They somehow run into a violent storm. Blown off course and low on fuel, the crew makes a forced ocean landing. After drifting for six days, they come upon an island. The crew reconnoiters for food.

Years passed, and Lars Larson is the Captain of a tramp steamer smuggling Chinese laborers to Veracruz. Ah Wing is in charge of the captive workers, an opium smuggler, and the man responsible for paying Captain Larson. Ah Wing approaches the Captain and states he will pay $2000 if Larson alters course so Wing can find a young female concubine. Larson agrees to keep a lookout.

Captain Larson's boat stumbles across the same island and starts a reconnaissance. Along with Ah Wing, the Captain sees an older man and a young girl waving a distress flag. Wing tells Larson he wants the girl, and Larson agrees to dock the boat. The ship launches a dinghy to pick up the girl, hermit, and the seaplane crew. After they load the passengers, the vessel embarks. Soon, they run into a powerful storm.

During the storm, Wing visits the Captain's quarters and pays Larson the money to the girl. Wing heads toward the girl's cabin to collect his prize. The girl (Maria), seeing what Wing has in mind, flees to the Captain's cabin. Marie pleads with Larson to protect her. Larson refuses, and Wing pursues the terrified woman. Lieutenant Jack Connell hears Maria's screams and rushes to her rescue. During the ensuing fight, Connell is knocked-out.

Ah Wing grabs Maria and escapes the Captain's quarters. After Wing leaves, Lars spots the necklace lying on the floor. He picks up the trinket and realizes it is the exact necklace he gave to his beloved Anna. The hermit enters the cabin, and Captain Lars presses him about the source of the necklace.

The hermit describes the day that Carl Krueger kidnapped the pregnant Anna. After Krueger's ship sailed off with Anna, the boat ran into a squall. The vessel sinks with all hands except for Anna and the first mate. They made their way to the island. The baby was born, and Anna died. Lars realizes that Maria is his daughter. Maria flees to the arms of the lieutenant, and they both leave the room.

Upon realizing that Maria is his daughter, Lars grabs his gun and heads to Ah wing's cabin. During the confrontation, Ah Wing flees the cabin and heads below the ship. Ah Wing releases the Chinese prisoners, instructing them to take over the ship.

Lieutenant Connell rouses the crew, and fighting breaks out everywhere. Even though outnumbered, the ship's crew and naval crew continue the fight.

A Pacific Fleet dispatched a submarine to hunt for the missing seaplanes. The submarine submerged to avoid the storm. While searching, they see the fracas onboard Larson's boat and decide to help. After the submarine surfaces, she takes on water. The crew boards the steamer before losing the sub and helps defeat the rebellion.

The Chinese laborers are subdued and returned to the Brig. Larson tracks down Ah Wing and shoots him. He returns to his quarters to find the hermit telling Maria the Captain is her father. Maria smiles and calls Lars–Daddy.

Sometime later, the repaired PN9 seaplane lands in the San Francisco harbor. The crowds are cheering. Captain Lars and his daughter are onshore, welcoming the naval crew home.

== Cast ==
Actor	Role
Knute Erickson	Lars Larson
Marcella Daly	Anna Larson (Lar's wife)
David Dunbar	Karl Kruger (Skipper of the "Gretchen")
Frank Hemphill	Jan Johnson
James Wang	Ah Wing
Harlan Hilton	Commander Roger Davis
Cecil Ogden	Lieutenant Jack Connell - Pilot
Skiles Ralph Pope	Ralph Pope - navigation pilot
Otto G. Stantz	Otis Stantz - Chief Radio Operator
Robert Anderson	Nuts Swanson
James Rolph Jr.	Himself - Mayor of San Francisco
Virginia Fry	Marie Larson
William Sunderholm	Sang Hop, servant of Ah Wing
Peggy O'Neil	Olga Nelson
Toshiye Ichioka	Extra (uncredited)

Toshia Mori was born Toshiye Ichioka in 1912 and first appeared in several Japanese and Hollywood silent films. This film was her first role in an American silent film. She was 14 years old, and her role was uncredited. With her distinctly Asian looks and bangs, she played exotic Asian females in silent films and talkies. In 1932, Mori became the only non-Caucasian actress selected as a WAMPAS Baby Star, an annual list of young and promising film actresses. She dropped out of the movies in 1937.

== Production ==
=== Pre-production ===
FBO mainly specialized in the production and distribution of low-budget films. These films were distributed to smaller venues throughout the United States. The average cost per production was $50,000 to $75,000 equivalent to $961,730 to $1,442,594 in 2022. FBO also produced and distributed a limited number of big-budget features labeled "Gold Bond" productions. In 1926, FBO had twelve gold bond productions including The Non-Stop Flight.

==== Development ====
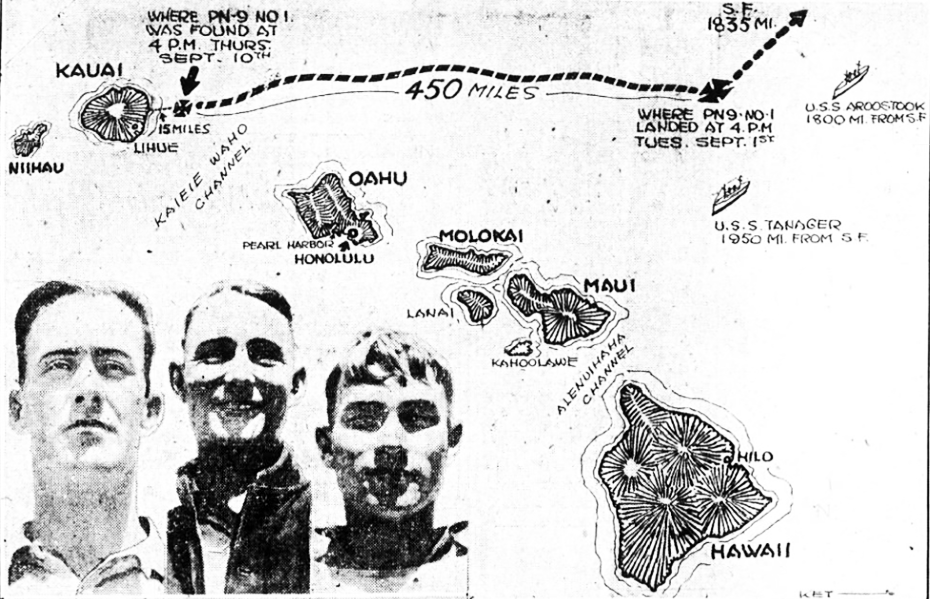
Newspaper Flight Map

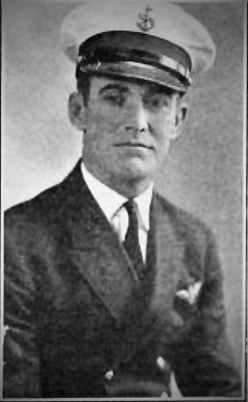
CPO
Skiles Pope

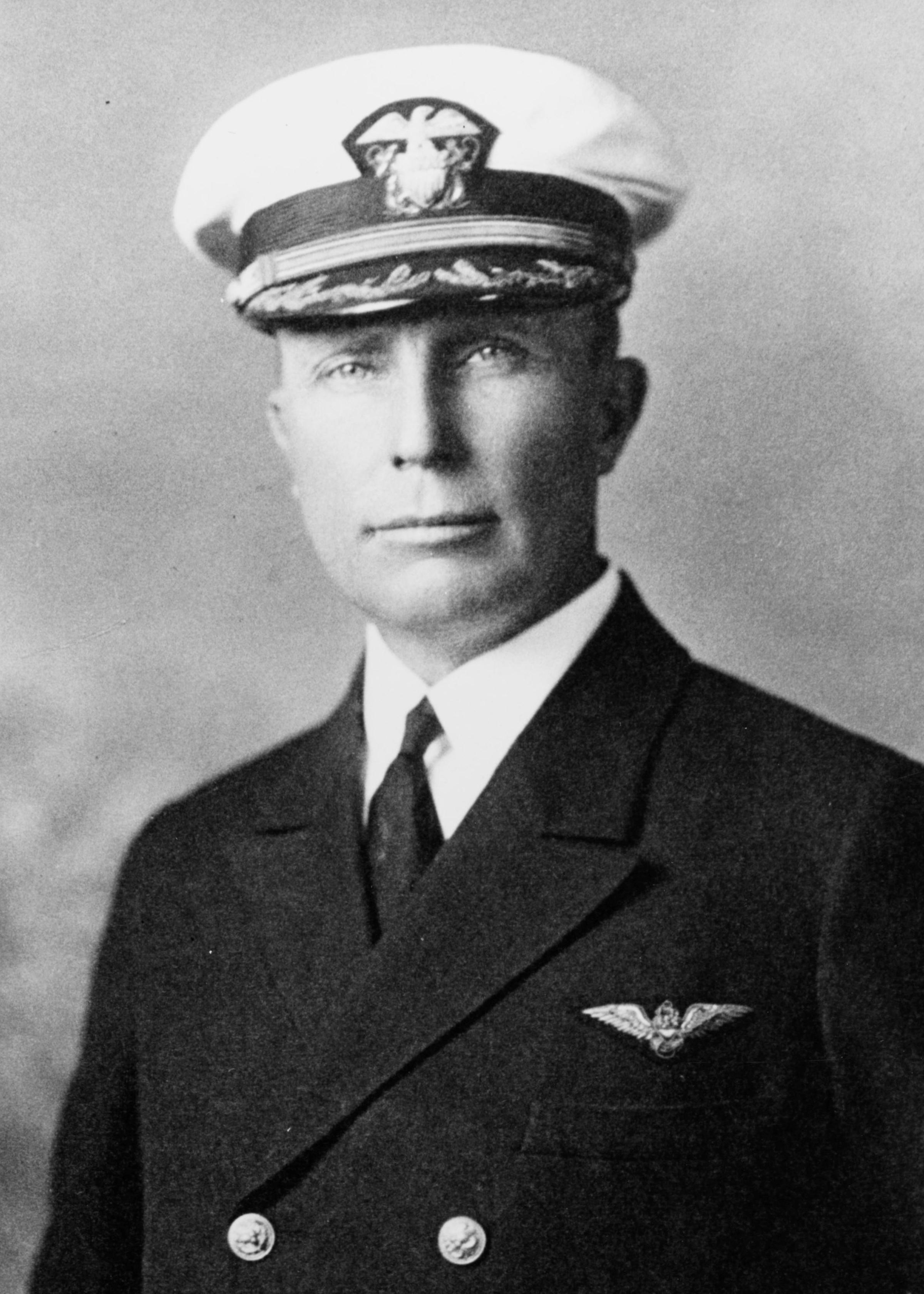
Commander John Rodgers

The 1925 attempt by the United States Navy to fly three Seaplanes, non-stop, between San Pablo, California and Hawaii provided motivation for the Emilie Johnson story. Despite the flight's failure to reach Hawaii, one seaplane, PN-9 No. 1, set a Class C seaplane record for non-stop miles flown over the Pacific Ocean. That record would stand for five years. The September flight created quite a sensation, grabbing newspaper headlines around the world.

PN-9 No 1 was an open cockpit naval seaplane captained by U.S. Navy Commander John Rodgers. The plane departed San Pablo, California's calm waters, on August 31, 1925. On September 1, the flying boat had flown 1,841 miles. With its fuel supply running low, the crew made a forced landing on the Ocean, leaving the craft 450 miles short of its goal. The desperate crew rigged a sail from the fabric on the plane's wing and set sail for Hawaii, believing this gave them their best odds of recovery. At 1600 on September 10, 1925, nine days into their adventure, a submarine USS R-4 recovered the crew.

A five-person naval crew piloted the twin-engine PN-9 No 1 seaplane:

- Commander John Rodgers
- Lieutenant Byron J. Connell
- Aviation Machinist Mate 1st Class William M. Bowlin
- Chief Radioman Petty Officer 1st Class Otis G. Stantz
- Chief Petty Officer Skiles Ralph Pope

==== Casting ====
- Knute Erickson (1873 – 1945) was born Knut Timar on May 27, 1873, in Norrköping, Sweden. Erickson was 52 years old when he portrayed the character of sea captain Lars Larson. Erickson migrated to the United States with his parents in 1881. They stayed in Salt Lake City, Utah, and kept living there until 1916. Erickson achieved naturalization on Jun 10, 1887, and launched a lucrative career as a vaudevillian comedian. His most famous stage creation was that of the character Swedish Immigrant Daffy Dan. Erickson began his film career in 1915 and kept appearing in films until 1936. Erickson's role in this film impressed Emory Johnson enough; he cast Erickson in his next movie, The Fourth Commandment.
- Marcella Daly (1901 – 1966) was born on January 31, 1901, in Kansas City, Missouri. Daly was 25 years old when she portrayed the character of Anna Larson (Lar's wife). She was an actress, known for Accused (1925), The Midnight Watch (1927), and Black Paradise (1926). She died on 30 July 1966 in Torrance, California, USA.
- David Dunbar (1886 – 1953) was born on September 14, 1886, in West Maitland, New South Wales, Australia. The Australian actor was 39 years old when he portrayed the character of Karl Kruger (Skipper of the "Gretchen"). He was a stage actor in Australia, and Britain before beginning his screen career with Pathe Freres, Paris in 1910. He would remain active until his death in 1953. A few weeks before this movie was released, his wife Blanche was killed in a car collision in the Hollywood Hills.
- Johnson also cast two members of the PN-9's original crew to act in the motion picture. They would portray the same roles in the movie they held when they served in the original's crew flight, i.e., Skiles Ralph Pope as the navigation pilot and Otto G. Stantz Chief Radio Operator.

==== Director ====
In 1923, Emilie and Emory Johnson signed a contract extension with FBO. The agreement stipulated Emory was to make eight attractions for FBO. The agreement stipulated that his previous four films would count toward the total. FBO also agreed to invest two and a half million dollars (In today's money – equivalent to $43,707,753 in 2022) on the remaining four films. The final four films would all be "Gold Bond" releases, i.e., big-budget films.

The March 1926 release of The Non-Stop Flight was the eighth film directed by Johnson for FBO. Johnson's FBO contract was satisfied with the March 1926 release. It would turn out to be Emory and Emilie Johnson's last film for FBO. In April 1926, FBO decided to let Emory and Emilie Johnson's contracts expire. No reasons were cited.

Emory Johnson, the "Master of Melodrama", "King of Exploitation" and "Hero of the Working Class" movie-making career was not over. In June 1926, Johnson and his mother signed a new eight-picture deal with Universal. Emory Johnson would continue to direct 5 more films before his career faded. During his movie career, Johnson directed 13 films of which 11 were silent, and 2 were talkies.

==== Screenplay ====
Emilie Johnson penned the story and screenplay. She was born on June 3, 1867, in Gothenburg, Västra Götaland, Sweden. After emigrating to America, she married Alfred Jönsson. Their only son was born in 1894 - Alfred Emory Johnson.

The Non-Stop Flight was the twentieth story developed by Emilie Johnson. It would become the ninth story her son, Emory Johnson, picked up for production. After finishing the story, she would go on to create the screenplay. This story fascinated her because it tells the story of a Swedish sea captain. The story also originates in her native homeland of Sweden. Emilie Johnson, was 59 years old when she completed the story and the screenplay.

Emilie Johnson intertwined her story around the original flight, so it seems the flight is a central theme. In truth, PN-9's flight becomes secondary to the sea captain's plot. Hopeful the flight details remained fresh in the public's mind, the story and screenplay were rushed to production.

After completing The Non-Stop Flight, Emilie Johnson would write the story for her son's next production - the March 1927 Universal release of The Fourth Commandment.

=== Filming ===
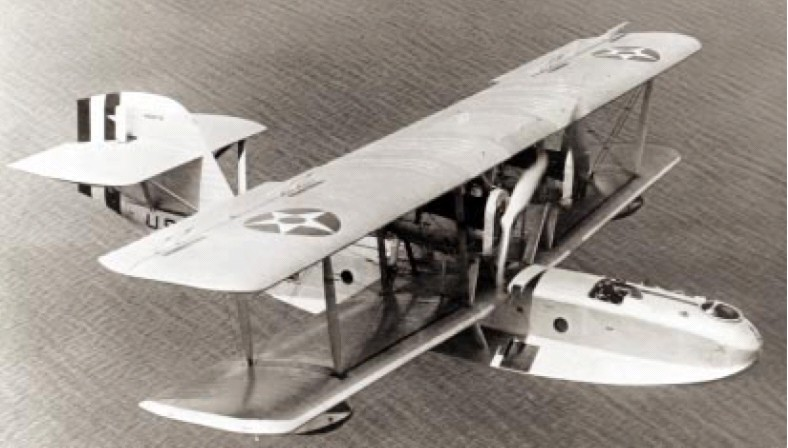
A PN-9 in flight

Johnson got permission from the United States Navy to use the actual PN-9 No 1 flying boat in his movie. Besides using the original plane, he also got the complete cooperation of the US Navy in making this photoplay. The Navy not only allowed Johnson to film flying scenes but paraded the entire battle fleet consisting of Dreadnoughts, Destroyers, and Submarines for Emory to film.

Johnson publicly denied published reports he intended to make his film a political weapon. Johnson suppressed rumors that he made specific arrangements with the Naval Department for their full endorsement. Johnson also squelched rumors the production had any significance in the aviation controversy concerning Colonel Billy Mitchell in Washington.

Johnson addressed these rumors by stating:

I will play no politics and picturize no propaganda. I expect to pay as glowing a tribute as I am able to the great cause of aviation and particularly to the epochal hop to Hawaii made by those daring naval aviators who have left their names written in imperishable fire across the vast vault of the Pacific.

— Emory Johnson, January 24, 1926

==== Locations ====
Principal photography and Exteriors were shot in San Diego, California. Closing shots were filmed in San Francisco, California. Aerial photography was shot over the Pacific Ocean with the complete cooperation of the United States Navy. The final edited version consisted of six reels and ran approximately 71 minutes.

=== Post production ===
Post-production is a crucial step in filmmaking, transforming the raw footage into the finished product. It requires skilled professionals working together to create a film that meets the director's vision and engages audiences.

== Release and reception ==
=== Official release ===
On April 12, 1926, the film was copyrighted to R-C (Robertson-Cole) Pictures Corp. (Note: The final copyright listing was entered into the record as shown: THE NON-STOP FLIGHT. 1926. 6 reels. Credits: Director, Emory Johnson; story, Emilie Johnson. © R-C Pictures Corp.; 12Apr26; LP22702;) The copyrights for FBO Films were registered with their original British owners. FBO was the official name of the film-distributing operation for Robertson-Cole Pictures Corp. Joseph P. Kennedy Sr. would clear this up later.

The film was released on March 28, 1926, by Film Booking Offices of America.

=== Advertising ===
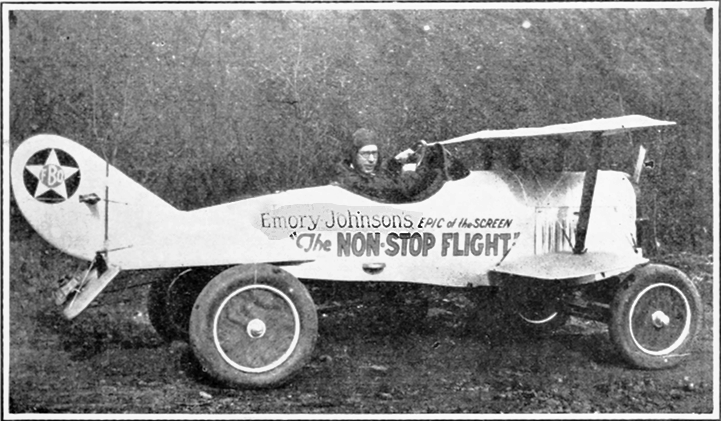
Advertising the Non-stop flight

This film's advertising campaign showed a lackluster effort by FBO's standards when compared to previous Emory Johnson films. Innovative advertising and exploitation had become a brand of Emory Johnson's productions for FBO. The advertising campaign for this movie was not innovative. It did not pioneer any novel techniques in the art of film promotion. It lacked imaginative advertising and exploitation.

Emory's films earned him the moniker as the "Master of Melodrama." Emery's other title - "King of Exploitation" was mainly because of his association with FBO's exploitation genius - Director of Publicity, advertising, and exploitation Nat Rothstein.

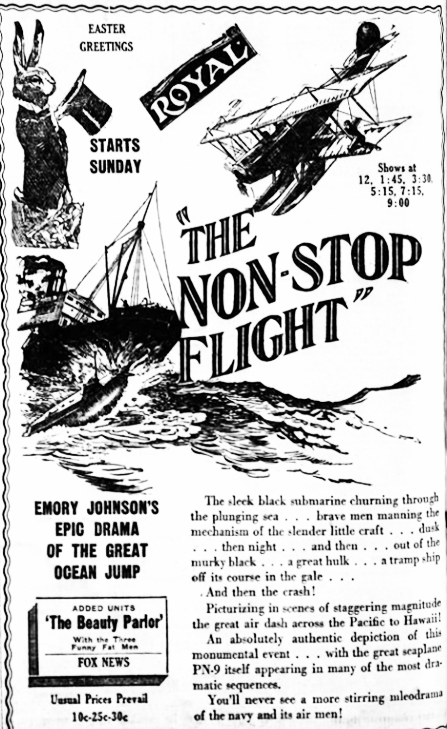
Newspaper ad

These are some of the suggestions for advertising this film:

- Movie houses could hire airplanes to fly over the theater, dropping parachutes bearing a ticket number that entitled finders to a pair of seats in the theater or merchandise.
- Grindhouses could create paper seaplanes and hang them in their lobbies along with scores of balloons.
- If a U.S. Navy post was nearby, the theater owner should try to enlist their cooperation in publicizing the film.
- Advertise the thrills each viewer will experience when watching the movie.
- Ensure the newspaper emphasized how Commander Rodgers and his crew almost lost their lives on this adventure.
- Emphasize, the film used the actual U.S. Navy PN-9 No1 Seaplane.

These were conventional advertising techniques for the twenties.

=== Reviews ===
==== Critical response ====
Movie reviews were critical opinions for theater owners and fans. Critiques of movies printed in different trade journals were vital in determining whether to book or watch the movie. Movie critics' evaluations of this film were mixed i.e., most small-town venues enjoyed the movie, but the larger cities were not swept up in the film's melodrama and patriotism. When critics have divergent reviews, deciding whether to see or book the movie can be challenging, especially since mixed reviews do not mean it is a bad movie. Ultimately, it boils down to personal choices and how much value you place on the movie review and the reviewer. Movie critics and theater owners often use the following expressions to describe the movies they are reviewing or showing.
Terms used in reviewing silent movie melodrama

Michael L. Simmons reviewed the film in the May 1, 1926 issue The Film Daily

With the admiration for the heroic crew still warm in the hearts of Americans ... was ... is timely. However, in strong contrast to the authenticity of the scenes showing the seaplane in flight is the flagrantly fictitious element in the story. Dignified treatment of the subject and the desire to provide sensational episodes were disregarded.

The romance element is somewhat anemic, the production's forts being the "meller" thrills that work up to a smashing climax. For the more gullible audiences. Where they like the melodrama in thick slices, this will more than satisfy.

Fred reviewed the movie in the July 7, 1926 issue of the Variety

Melodrama built around the nonstop flight that the U.S.N. flyers made from San Francisco to Hawaii. It is just a hoak meller that will, for the better part, carry in some of the smaller grindhouses but isn't suited for a longer run, except where it comes in on a double feature bill.

The non-stop flight is worked into a picture through the Navy airman coming down near the island so that the tramp steamer affects the rescue of them as well as the castaways. Just a dash of patriotic stuff to fill in with the Meller stuff. Much sea stuff and the newsweekly stuff or the original hop-off, together with some fill-in shots, well-matched up.

M. T. Andrews reviewed the photoplay in the April 27, 1926 issue of the Motion Picture News

It was inevitable that one of the most colorful incidents of current times should find its way to the screen. Emily Johnson wrote a story of drama and venture into the great ocean passage. The plot is not altogether plausible or commensurate with the main theme, which deserved more dignified treatment.

After an exceptionally fine first reel, the director shows flashes of skill and introduces characters, the action slackens. Offers remarkably fine views of Navy seaplane PN-9. Weaves in not particularly strong romance, but there are enough mellow thrills to keep the interest alive. Will please the average fan. Suitable for neighborhoods and smaller houses.

==== Audience response ====
FBO focused on producing and distributing films for small-town venues. They served this market melodramas, non-Western action pictures, and comedic shorts. These moviehouse reviews were critical for a distributor like FBO. Unlike many of the major Hollywood studios, FBO did not own its own set of theaters. Like most independents, FBO was dependent on the moviehouse owners to rent their films for the company to show a profit.

These are brief published observations from moviehouse owners. Theater owners would subscribe to various movie magazines, read the movie critic's reviews, then read the theater owner's reports. These reviews would assist them in deciding if the film was a potential moneymaker in their venue.

David City, Nebraska population 2,250

Star cast. Very nice entertainment. Plenty of excitement. Tone, good. Sunday or special, no. Appeal, 75%. Draw general class

Melville, Louisiana population 1,000

All-star cast, but all the stars were unknown. One of FBO Gold Bonds, and it is pipin for those who like melodrama. Plenty of good acting and the world's of action, with several thrills that make 'em sit up in their seats—some splendid photographic shots from an airplane. Little town men, this pie is made for you to serve. Sunday, yes Special, not quite. Appeal, very strong. Draw all types.

Lubbock, Texas population 10,000

Star cast. Excellent picture. We did big business on this picture. You can't go wrong by booking this picture. Full house both days and everyone pleased

Rochester, Pennsylvania population 7,000

A very good mellow drama, but the scenario is very poorly constructed. Great for Saturdays. The paper is very good. The title should pull them in. Tone OK. Good appeal! Dry mix class

== Preservation status ==
Many silent-era films did not survive for reasons as explained on this Wikipedia page. (Note: Film is history. With every foot of film lost, we lose a link to our culture, the world around us, each other, and ourselves. – Martin Scorsese, filmmaker, director NFPF Board A report by Library of Congress film historian and archivist David Pierce estimates that: around 75% of original silent-era films have perished; 14% of the 10,919 silent films released by major studios exist in their original 35 mm or other formats; 11% survive only in full-length foreign versions or film formats of lesser image quality.)

According to the Library of Congress American Silent Feature Film Survival Database, this film is extant. (Note: According to the posting on the American Silent Feature Film Survival Database, the following information was provided: Copyright claimant: Emory Johnson Productions Registration number: Lp22702 Holdings: U.S. Archive Studio: R-C/FBO Completeness: complete Format: 35 mm: Usw Note: 35 mm Acetate Dupe Negative: Usw 16 mm Acetate Dupe Negative: Usw Record No.: 27814) The film's original length is listed at 6 reels. The film was converted to DVD and released on December 10, 2019. The film is widely available from multiple vendors.

== PN-9 fate ==
After the flight, Commander John Rodgers was rewarded with an assignment as the Assistant Chief of Bureau of Aeronautics. Rodgers would later die in a plane crash on August 27, 1926. The date was almost a year after completing his historic flight. He was forty-five at the time of his death.

PN-9, after completing the first non-stop attempt to Hawaii, the seaplane was repaired and returned to service. Emory Johnson used the craft to make his epic film. Later in the year, the seaplane attempted to make another non-stop flight to South America. In an encore, engine problems again forced the airplane to make a forced sea landing in the Caribbean. The crew drifted for several days before being rescued.

In his book No Margin For Error, author Dwight Messimer points out the fate of the PN-9 No 1 after the Caribbean incident "because the towing distance to shore was too great, the plane was ignobly sunk by gunfire as a hazard to navigation."

== Gallery ==
Crew of PN-9 No 1 commanded by Commander John Rodgers

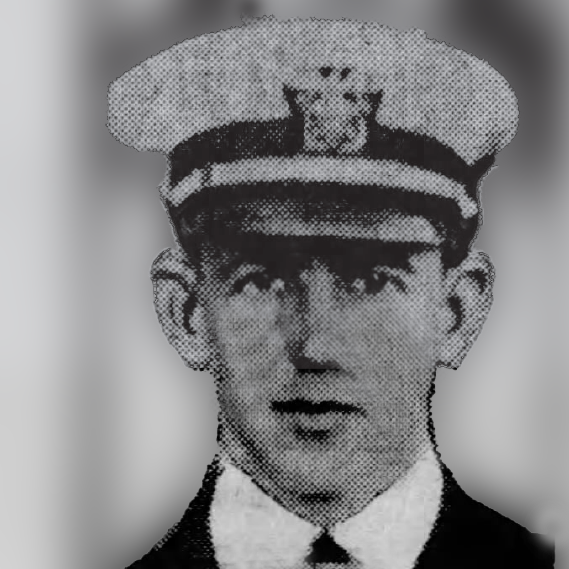
Lt. Byron J. Connell

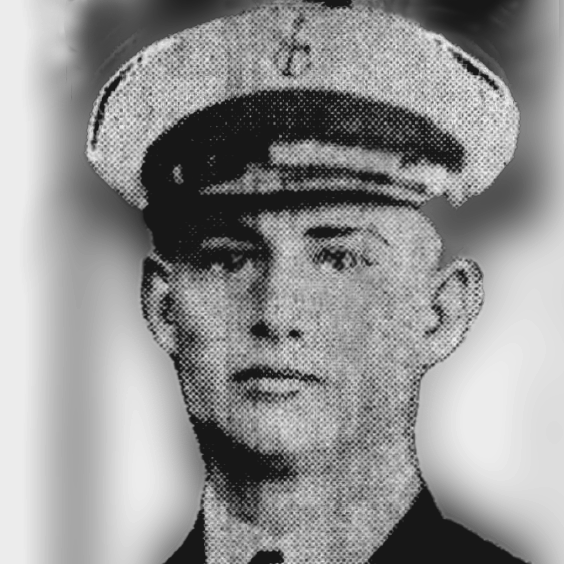
RM1/c Otis G. Stantz

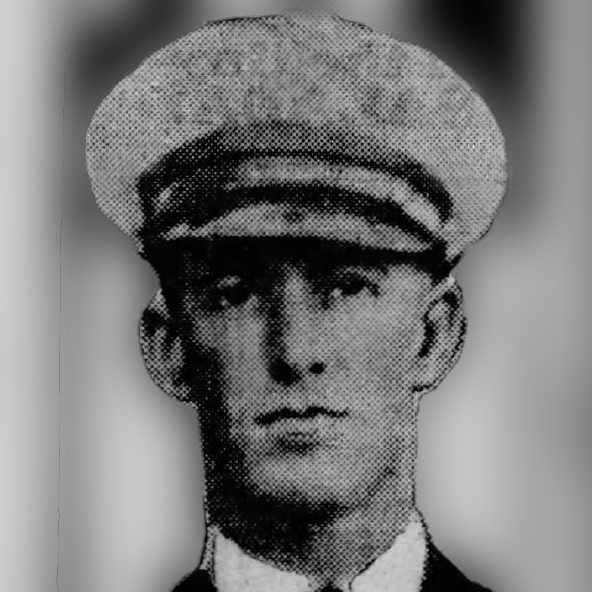
CPO Skiles R. Pope

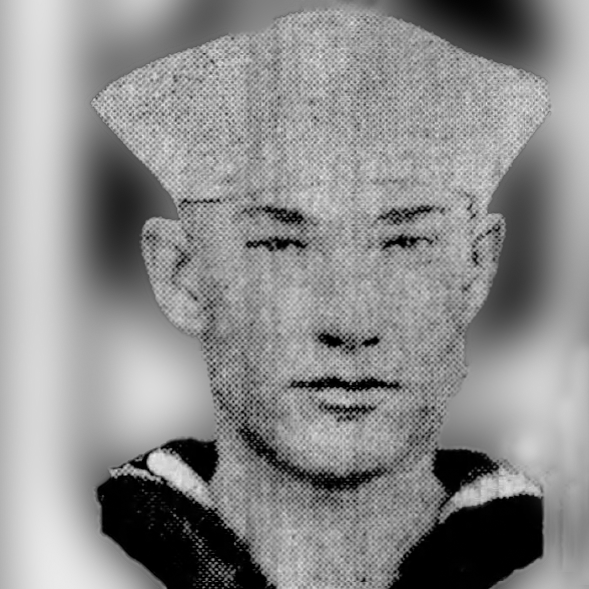
MM1/c William M. Bowlin

Players, Director

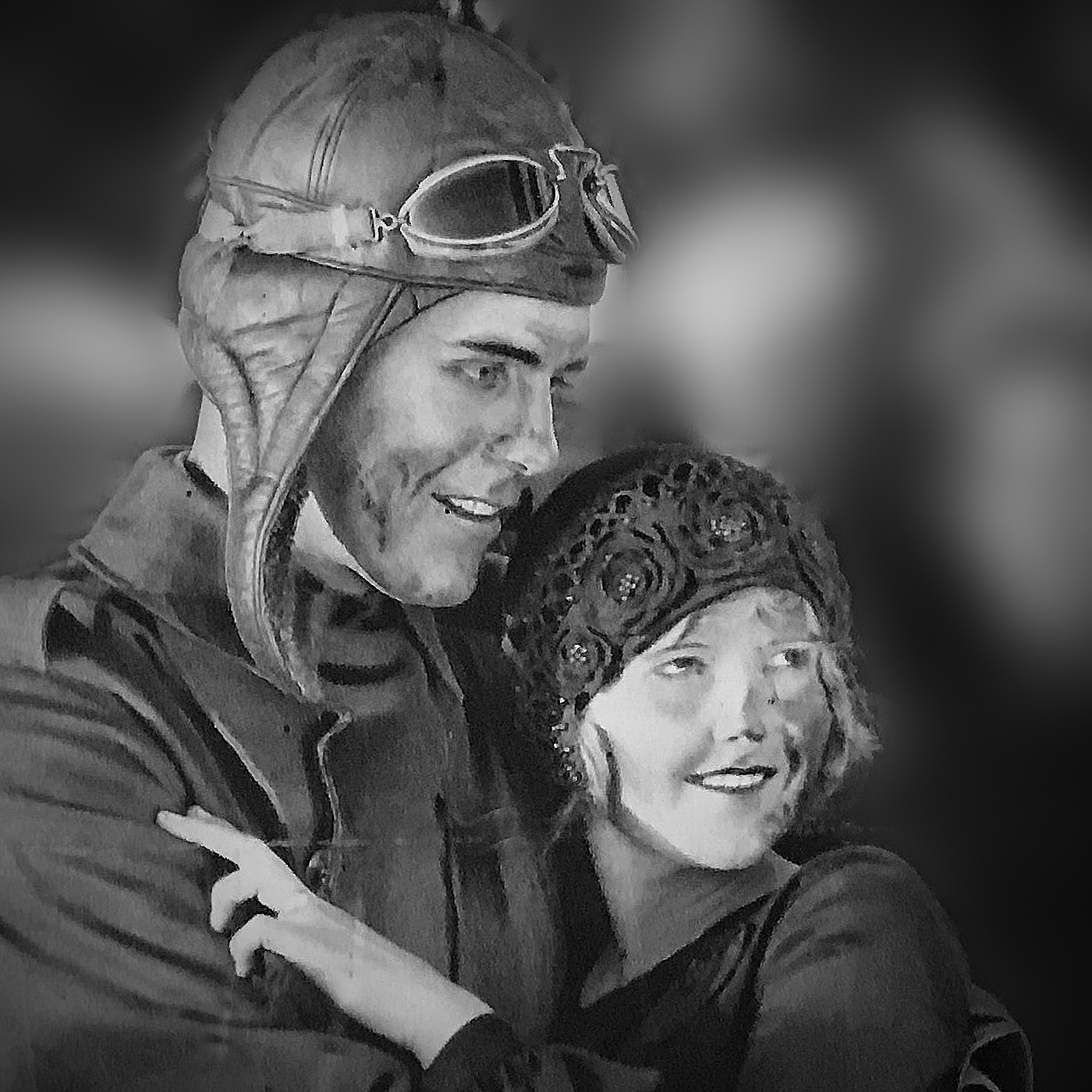
Cecil Ogden and Virginia Fry

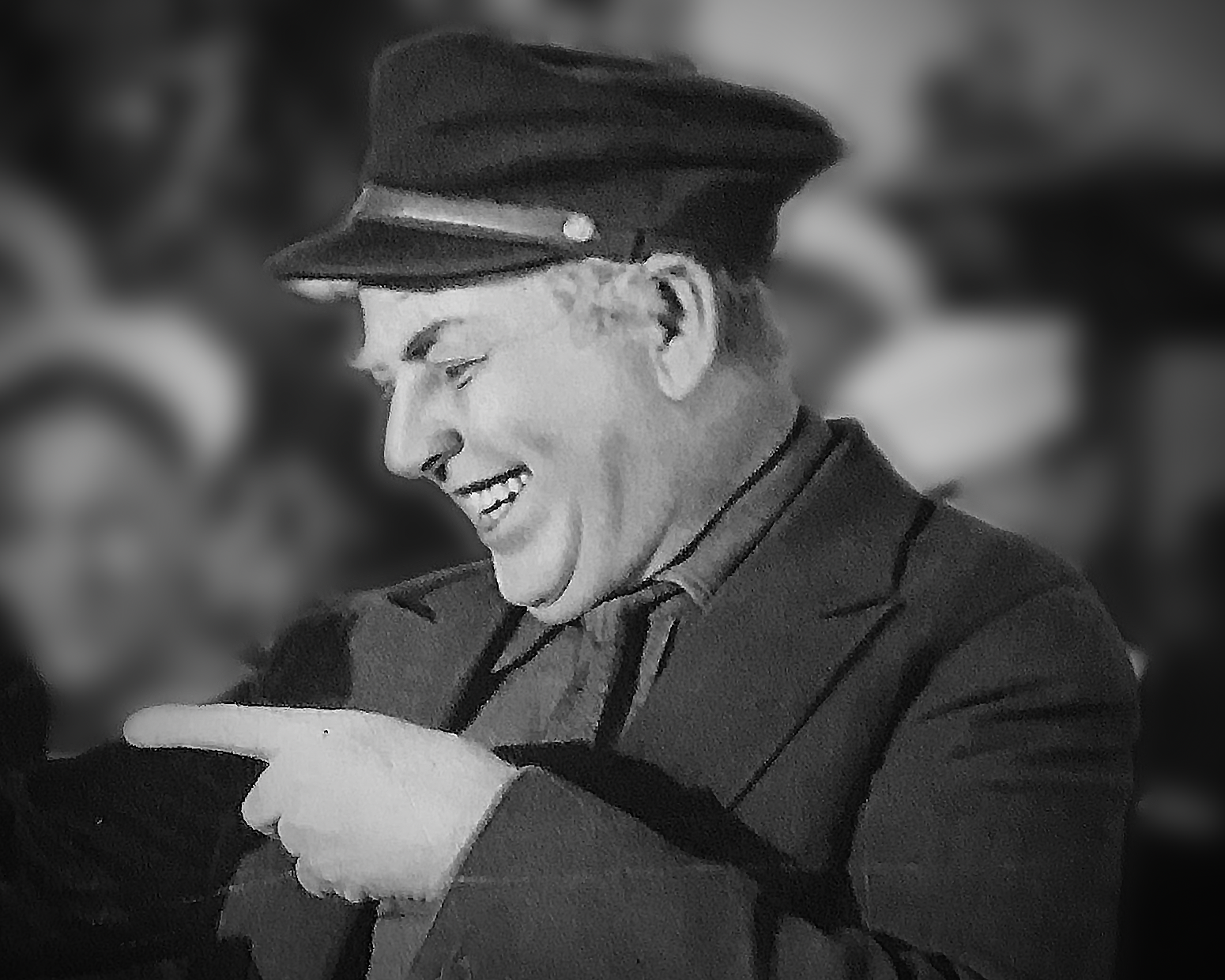
Knute Erickson

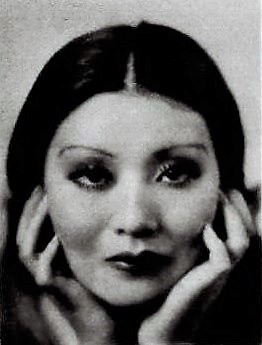
Toshia Mori
as Extra (uncredited)

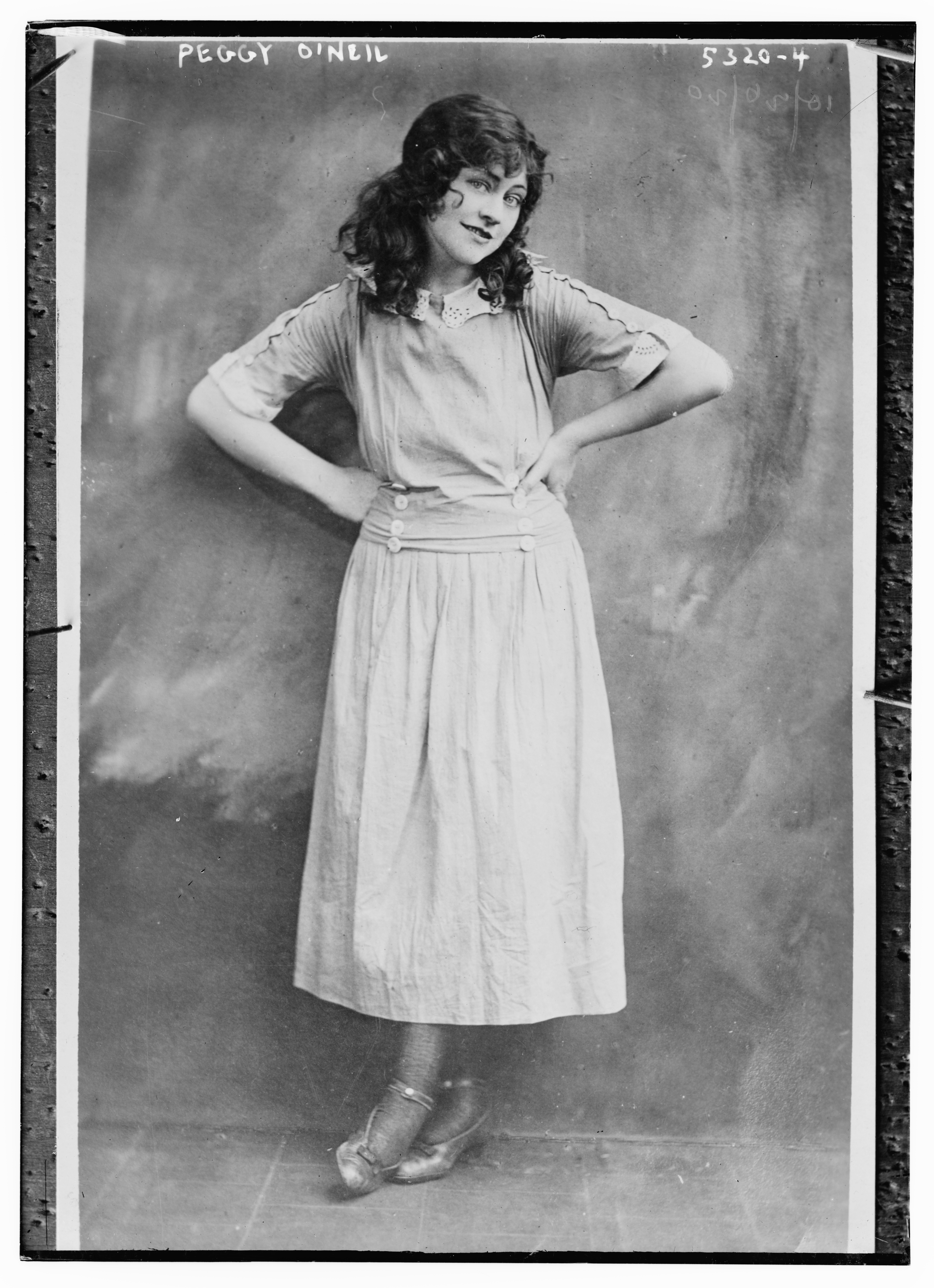
Peggy O'Neil

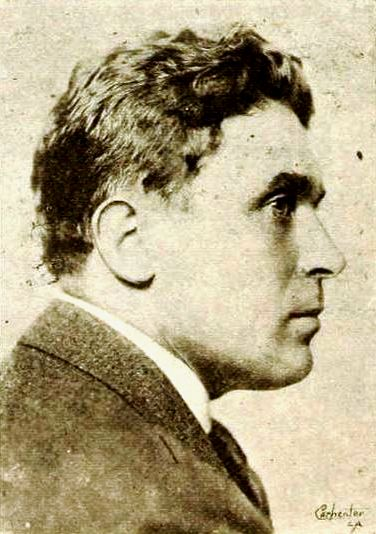
Robert Anderson
as Nuts Swanson

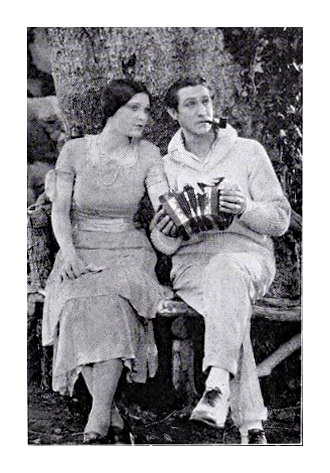
Marcella Daly

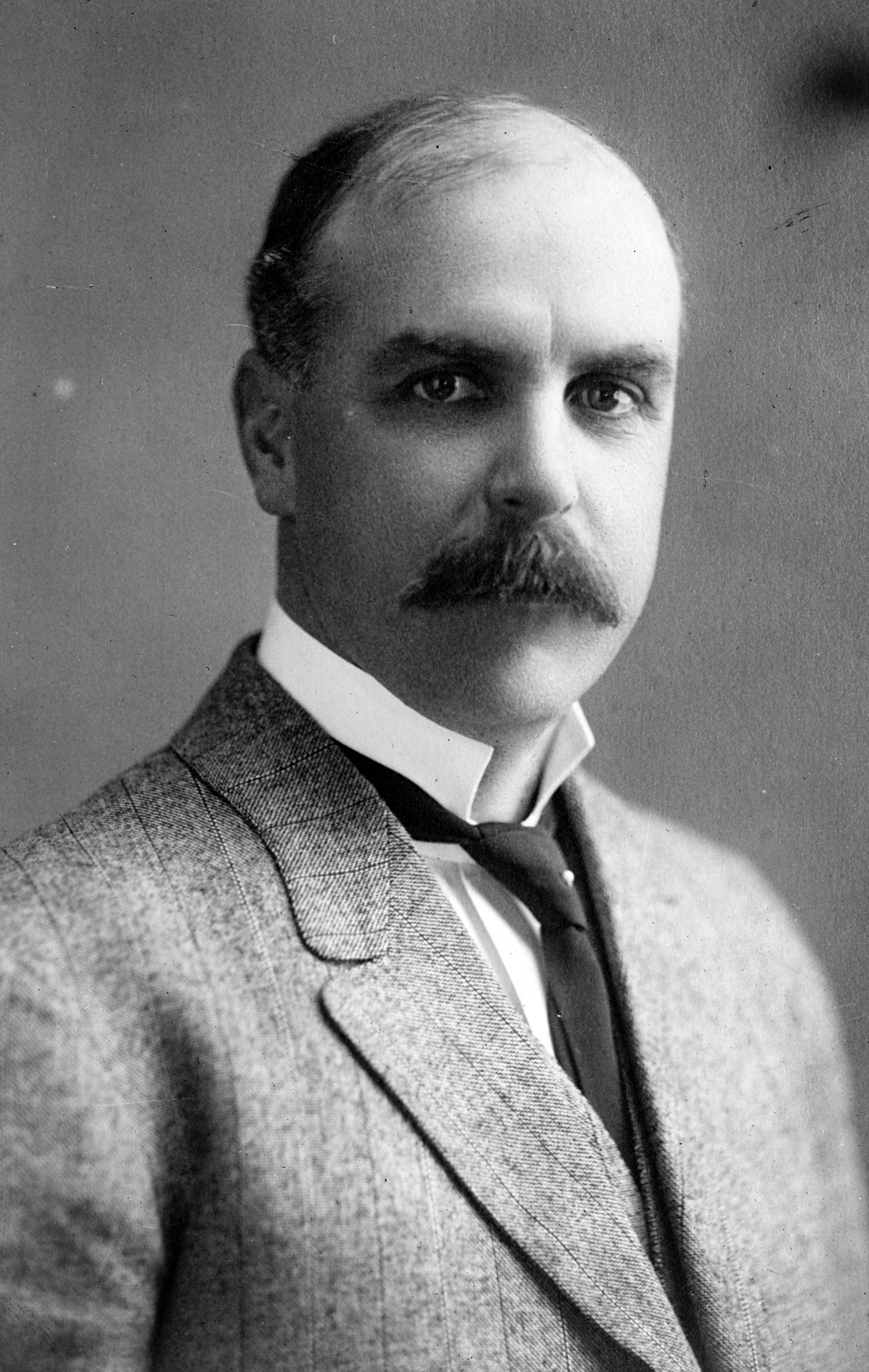
Mayor of San Francisco
as himself

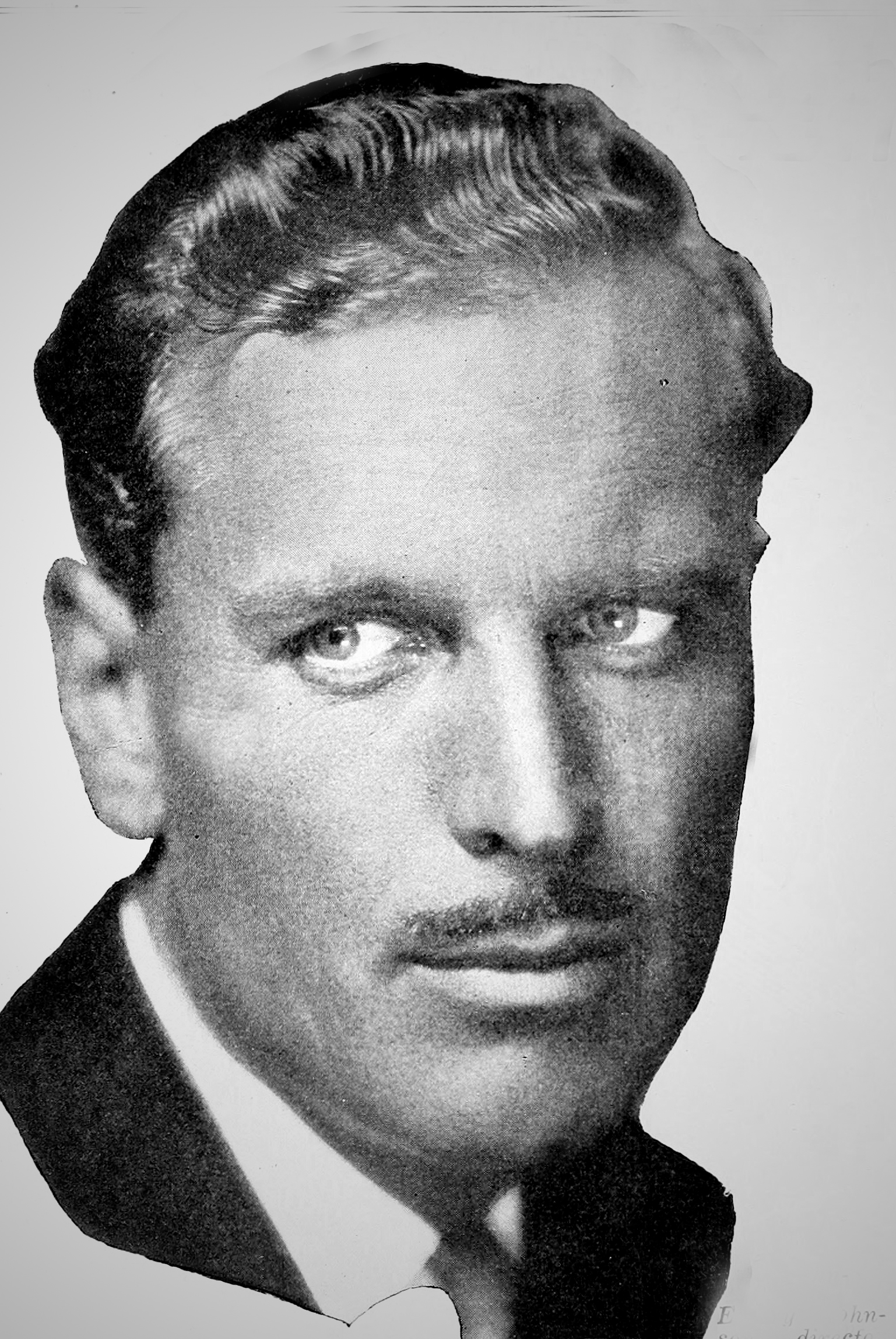
Emory Johnson
Director & Producer

== Bibliography ==
- Plumbe, G.E.; Langland, J. (1925). The Chicago Daily News Almanac and Year-book for 1926. Chicago Daily News Company.
- Messimer, D.R. (1981). No Margin for Error: The U.S. Navy's Transpacific Flight of 1925. United States Navy's Transpacific Flight of 1925. Naval Institute Press. ISBN 978-0-87021-497-4.
- United States. Naval Air Systems Command; Naval Historical Center (U.S.) (1988). Naval Aviation News (in Estonian). Chief of Naval Operations.
- Katchmer, George A. (2002). A Biographical Dictionary of Silent Film Western Actors and Actresses. Jefferson, North Carolina: McFarland & Company. p. 478. ISBN 0-786407-63-8.
