= Fourth Commandment =

The Fourth Commandment of the Ten Commandments may refer to:

- "Remember the sabbath day, to keep it holy", under the Philonic division used by Hellenistic Jews, Greek Orthodox and Protestants except Lutherans, or the Talmudic division of the third-century Jewish Talmud
- "Honour thy father and thy mother", under the Augustinian division used by Roman Catholics and Lutherans

== Films ==
- The Fourth Commandment (1927 film), an American silent drama film
- The Fourth Commandment (1950 film), an Austrian historical drama film
