= Confessin' =

1930 popular jazz standard

"(I'm) Confessin' (that I Love You)"

Song
- Published: 1930
- Genre: Jazz
- Composers: Ralph Edward 'Doc' Daugherty; Ellis Reynolds
- Lyricist: Al J. Neiburg

"(I'm) Confessin' (that I Love You)" (also known as "Confessin'", "I'm Confessin'", and "Confessin' that I Love You") is a jazz and popular standard that has been recorded many times.

== "Lookin' for Another Sweetie" (1929) ==
"Lookin' for Another Sweetie"

Song
- Published: 1929
- Songwriters: Chris Smith; Sterling Grant

The song was first produced, with different lyrics, as "Lookin' For Another Sweetie", credited to Chris Smith and Sterling Grant and recorded by Thomas "Fats" Waller & His Babies on December 18, 1929.

== "Confessin'" (1930) ==
In 1930, it was reborn as "Confessin'", with new lyrics by Al J. Neiburg; the music this time was credited to Ralph Edward 'Doc' Daugherty and Ellis Reynolds.

Louis Armstrong made his first, and highly influential, recording of the song in August 1930, and continued to play it throughout his career. Unlike the crooners, Armstrong did not try to deliver the original song's lyrics or melody; instead, he smeared and dropped lyrics and added melodic scat breaks.

== Cover versions ==
Other important recorded versions were done by:

- Jesse Crawford (1930)
- Chester Gaylord (1930)
- Seger Ellis (1930)
- Guy Lombardo (1930), Rudy Vallée (1930)
- Django Reinhardt (1934)
- Perry Como (1945)
- Les Paul and Mary Ford (1952)
- Ricky Nelson (1957)
- Frank Ifield (1963) – This cover was a number one hit in the United Kingdom and Ireland.
- Dean Martin (1964)
- Thelonious Monk (1965)
- Anne Murray (1993)
- Allen Toussaint (2016)
- Diana Krall (2017)
- Samara Joy (2022)

== See also ==
- List of 1930s jazz standards
