= Illusion (1929 film) =

1929 film

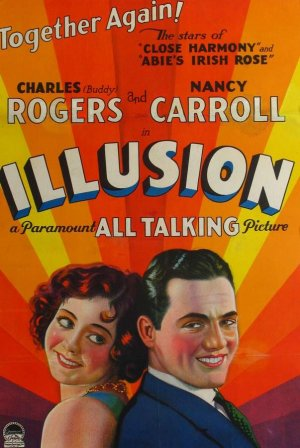
- Theatrical release poster
- Directed by: Lothar Mendes
- Screenplay by: Richard H. Digges Jr. E. Lloyd Sheldon; Arthur Chesney Train
- Produced by: B. P. Schulberg
- Starring: Charles "Buddy" Rogers; Nancy Carroll; June Collyer; Kay Francis; Regis Toomey; Knute Erickson; Eugenie Besserer
- Cinematography: Harry Fischbeck
- Edited by: George Nichols Jr.
- Production company: Paramount Pictures
- Distributed by: Paramount Pictures
- Release date: September 21, 1929
- Running time: 84 minutes
- Country: United States
- Language: English

Illusion is a 1929 American Pre-Code drama film directed by Lothar Mendes and written by Richard H. Digges Jr., E. Lloyd Sheldon, and Arthur Chesney Train. The film stars Charles "Buddy" Rogers, Nancy Carroll, June Collyer, Kay Francis, Regis Toomey, Knute Erickson, and Eugenie Besserer. The film was released on September 21, 1929, by Paramount Pictures.

== Plot ==
As described in a film magazine, Carlee Thorpe and Claire Jernigan have a magic act at the circus and finally get a chance to break into big-time vaudeville. However, Carlee has been playing around in society, working his way up by entertaining and performing parlor tricks and making money playing bridge. He falls for Hilda Schmittlap, whose husband had become wealthy and was social climbing for the family. Claire is broken hearted when Carlee refuses to take the vaudeville contract, and splits with him to join another magician named Magus. After a fling with society, Carlee has a talk with Hilda and they decide they will not make it together. He decides to return to Claire. Claire has become morose and exchanges harmless carbide bullets with real ones for a bit where Magus invites five men with the audience to shoot at her with rifles. Carlee comes to the theater just as the shots are fired and she falls when one of the five shots hits here in the shoulder. Carlee lifts her up, and there is a make-up between them at the hospital.

== Cast ==
- Charles "Buddy" Rogers as Carlee Thorpe
- Nancy Carroll as Claire Jernigan
- June Collyer as Hilda Schmittlap
- Kay Francis as Zelda Paxton
- Regis Toomey as Eric
- Knute Erickson as Mr. Jacob Schmittlap
- Eugenie Besserer as Mrs. Jacob Schmittlap
- Maude Turner Gordon as Queen of Dalmatia
- William Austin as Mr. Z
- Emilie Melville as Mother Fay
- Frances Raymond as Mrs. Y
- Catherine Wallace as Mrs. Z
- J.E. Nash as Mr. X
- William McLaughlin as Mr. Y
- Eddie Kane as Gus Bloomberg
- Michael Visaroff as Equerry
- Paul Lukas as Count Fortuny
- Richard Cramer as Magus
- Bessie Lyle as Consuelo
- G.L. McDonnell as Jarman
- Lillian Roth as Revolutionary Rhythm Dance Specialty
- Harriet Spiker as A Midget
- Anna Magruder as Fat Lady
- Albert Wolffe as Giant

== Music ==
The main theme song for the film was entitled "When The Real Thing Comes Your Way" which was composed by Larry Spier and Sam Coslow. This song is sung by both Nancy Carroll and Charles Buddy Rogers in the film. Secondary songs include "Revolutionary Rhythm" (by Lou Davis, J. Fred Coots, Sam Coslow and Larry Spier) and "Levee Love" (by Lou Davis, J. Fred Coots and Larry Spier). "Revolutionary Rhythm" is sung by Lillian Roth in one of the revue sequences.

== Preservation ==
This talkie feature is preserved in the Library of Congress collection.

== See also ==
- List of early sound feature films (1926–1929)
