= Pursued (disambiguation) =

Pursued may refer to:

- Pursued (1925 film), a 1925 American action drama film
- Pursued (1934 film), a 1934 American drama film
- Pursued, a 1947 American Neo-western film noir
- Pursued (2004 film), a 2004 film directed by Kristoffer Tabori
