= Whispering Jack Smith =

American singer

Jack Smith
- Publicity Photo of Whispering Jack Smith
- Born: Jacob Schmidt; May 30, 1896
- Died: May 13, 1950 (aged 53)

The label of a British record issue of Whispering Jack Smith's recording of Ich küsse ihre Hand, Madame (In Dreams I Kiss Your Hand, Madame) from 1928.

Jack Smith (born Jacob Schmidt, May 30, 1896 – May 13, 1950), known as "Whispering" Jack Smith, was an American baritone singer who was a popular radio and recording artist. He was at his most popular during the 1920s and 1930s, making a brief comeback in the late 1940s. He made occasional film appearances.

== Life ==
Smith was born in the Bronx, New York, the youngest son of Charles Henry Schmidt and Anna Staab. On his World War I Draft Registration Card (dated June 5, 1917, at a precinct in the Bronx, NYC) he gave his name as "Jacob J Schmidt", his date of birth as May 30, 1896, and his age as 21 years. He was a "Theatrical singer" employed by "McLaughlin Agency, Pgh, Pa"; and for Where Employed wrote "Traveling in Theatres" [sic]. His mother was his only dependent. He was single and Caucasian. The Registrar recorded him as "Tall" of "Medium" (build) with "Blue" (eyes) and "Brown" (hair), but "No" (to Visible Scars?). He had no disability. He signed the Card "Jack Schmidt".

Smith began his professional career in 1915, when he sang with a quartet at a theater in the Bronx. He was forced to develop his half-singing, half-talking style due to an injury sustained during WW1 when a gas shell exploded near him, damaging his lungs. After service in World War I, he got a job in 1918 as a "song plugger" for the Irving Berlin Music Publishing Company. He was a pianist at a radio station when he got his singing break substituting for a singer who failed to show up. Smith was exclusively on the radio, but beginning in 1925, he began making records. He enjoyed great success in 1926 and 1927 with the songs "Gimme a Lil' Kiss, Will Ya, Huh?" and "Me and My Shadow" which topped the charts of the day. He also started performing on-stage on the vaudeville circuit. In 1927, Smith toured England, performing with the Blue Skies Theater Company singing tunes such as "Manhattan" by Rodgers and Hart and songs by Gershwin, when he was suddenly replaced by a new all-girl singing trio, the Hamilton Sisters & Fordyce. Smith returned to New York and eventually went to work for NBC Radio.

He died in New York City after suffering a heart attack at the age of 53 and is buried next to his mother Anna Schmidt at St. Raymond's Cemetery in the Bronx, New York City. His grave is unmarked. He was outlived by his wife, Marie. A biography entitled Whispering Jack & Peggy 'O' (also about actress Peggy O'Neil) was released by Tate Publishing in February 2014. The timeline of the narrative is from just before the end of World War I until Smith's death. The book consists of 488 pages and includes pictures from Smith's home movies.

== Reviews ==
Smith's "disarmingly intimate, polite, and velvety smooth delivery ... distinguished him from everyone else." One reviewer in describing his "whispering" style said that, "His art was the epitome of understatement." Another indicated, "With a pleasing stage presence, and a genial manner, Whispering Jack Smith establishes contact with his audience just as soon as he sits at his grand piano, and he wins more applause with every song."

== Republications ==
His performances can be found on a number of compilations of recordings from the 1920s and 1930s. In 1995 Pavilion Records released a retrospective CD entitled Whispering Jack Smith. In 2000, ASV released the album Me and My Shadow, a compilation of his later songs, taking its title from the 1927 hit song "Me and My Shadow".

== See also ==
- Chester Gaylord The Whispering Serenader
