= West of Chicago =

1922 film

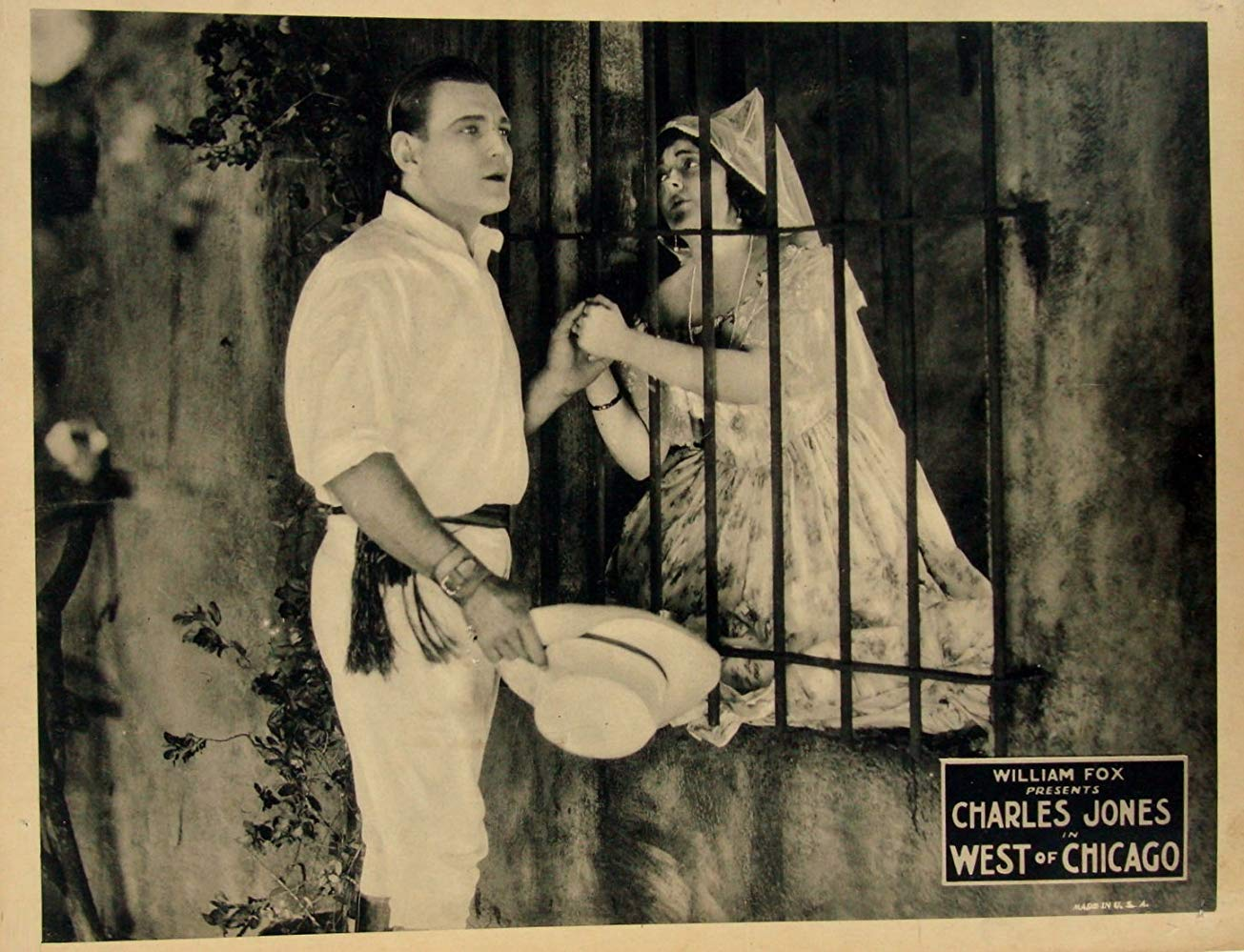
- Directed by: Scott R. Dunlap
- Written by: George Scarborough; Paul Schofield
- Produced by: William Fox
- Starring: Buck Jones; Renée Adorée; Philo McCullough
- Cinematography: Lucien N. Andriot
- Production company: Fox Film Corporation
- Distributed by: Fox Film Corporation
- Release date: September 3, 1922
- Running time: 50 minutes
- Country: United States
- Languages: Silent; English intertitles

West of Chicago is a lost 1922 American silent Western film directed by Scott R. Dunlap and starring Buck Jones, Renée Adorée and Philo McCullough.

== Cast ==
- Buck Jones as Conroy Daly
- Renée Adorée as Della Moore
- Philo McCullough as John Hampton
- Sidney D'Albrook as English Kid
- Charles K. French as Judson Malone
- Marcella Daly as Patricia Daily
- Kathleen Key as Señoria Gonzales
- Harold Miller as Bud Moore

== Bibliography ==
- Solomon, Aubrey. The Fox Film Corporation, 1915-1935: A History and Filmography. McFarland, 2011.
