= J. Benson Stafford =

American screenwriter

J. Benson Stafford was an American screenwriter. He worked in theatre and wrote silent film. He is known for writing the silent Pursued (1925 film).

== Career ==
He was a native of Buffalo, New York. He composed the comedy "That Girl from Boston," and "Two's company", copyrighted in 1907.

Stafford was first in the florist business, working with G. E. M. Stumpp (George Everett Martin Stumpp of New York) since circa 1913. He had a store on Chippewa street in Buffalo, New York. It has been reported at the time that his "window decorations have been much admired." In 1914 he did the decorating for the opening of the Gerber-Nott Co., wholesale millinery of Buffalo. (A company by Henry C. Gerber, the Vice President, and Dean R. Nott).

On January 13, 1918, Stafford closed his doors, explaining, because "business was and had been slow for some time."

In January, 1922, Stafford had "decided to forsake the florist business", and move to theatre.

He wrote the silent Pursued (1925 film).
