= Marcella Daly =

American actress (1901–1966)

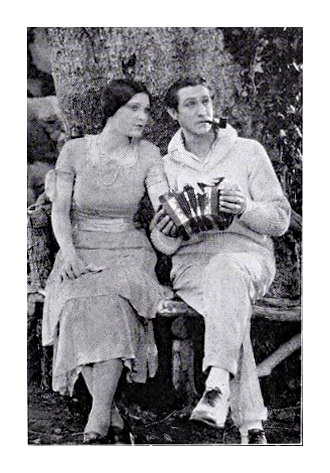
- Marcella Daly with Lou Tellegen in 1926.
- Born: January 31, 1901; Kansas City, Missouri, U.S.
- Died: July 30, 1966 (aged 65); Torrance, California, U.S.
- Occupation: Actor
- Years active: 1918-1928 (film)

Marcella Daly (1901–1966) was an American film actress of the silent era.

Daly was the daughter of Mr. and Mrs. P. H. Daly and a graduate of the Whittier School and Hollywood High School.

In June 1924, Daly received publicity when casting director Lewis Mason committed suicide and left a note that said, in part, "Everything I have, please give to Marcella Daly."

== Partial filmography ==
- Her Country First (1918)
- Trumpet Island (1920)
- The Star Rover (1920)
- West of Chicago (1922)
- The Folly of Vanity (1924)
- Dorothy Vernon of Haddon Hall (1924)
- The Great Jewel Robbery (1925)
- Defend Yourself (1925)
- The Movies (1925)
- Pursued (1925)
- The Prince of Pep (1925)
- Accused (1925)
- The Arizona Romeo (1925)
- Tearing Through (1925)
- Black Paradise (1926)
- The Non-Stop Flight (1926)
- Silk Stockings (1927)
- The Lone Eagle (1927)
- Married Alive (1927)
- The Arizona Wildcat (1927)
- The Midnight Watch (1927)
- Two Lovers (1928)

== Sources ==
- Katchmer, George A. (2015). A Biographical Dictionary of Silent Film Western Actors and Actresses. McFarland. ISBN 978-1-4766-0905-8. .
