= Married Alive =

1927 film

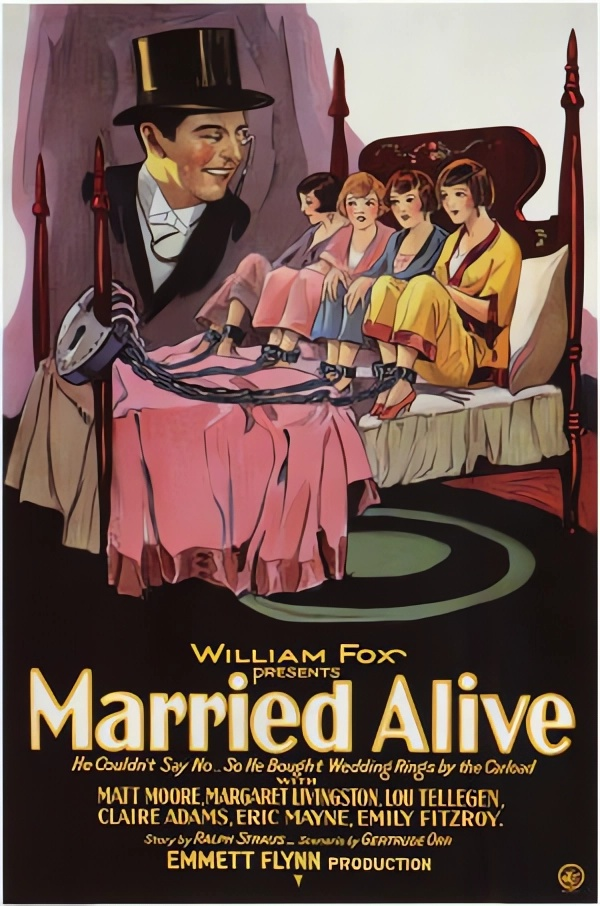
- Theatrical release poster
- Directed by: Emmett J. Flynn
- Screenplay by: Gertrude Orr
- Starring: Margaret Livingston; Matt Moore; Claire Adams; Gertrude Claire; Marcella Daly; Henry Sedley
- Cinematography: Ernest Palmer
- Production company: Fox Film Corporation
- Distributed by: Fox Film Corporation
- Release date: July 17, 1927
- Running time: 50 minutes
- Country: United States
- Language: Silent (English intertitles)

Married Alive is a 1927 American silent comedy film directed by Emmett J. Flynn and written by Gertrude Orr. The film stars Margaret Livingston, Matt Moore, Claire Adams, Gertrude Claire, Marcella Daly, and Henry Sedley. The film was released on July 17, 1927, by Fox Film Corporation.

== Cast ==
- Lou Tellegen as James Duxbury
- Margaret Livingston as Amy Duxbury
- Matt Moore as Charles Orme
- Claire Adams as Viola Helmesley Duxbury
- Gertrude Claire as Lady Rockett
- Marcella Daly as Blanche Fountain Duxbury
- Henry Sedley as Max Ferbur
- Eric Mayne as Dr. McMaster
- Charles Willis Lane as Mr. Fountain
- Emily Fitzroy as Mrs. Maggs Duxbury

== Preservation ==
With no prints of Married Alive located in any film archives, it is a lost film.
