= The Fourth Commandment (1927 film) =

1927 American silent drama film

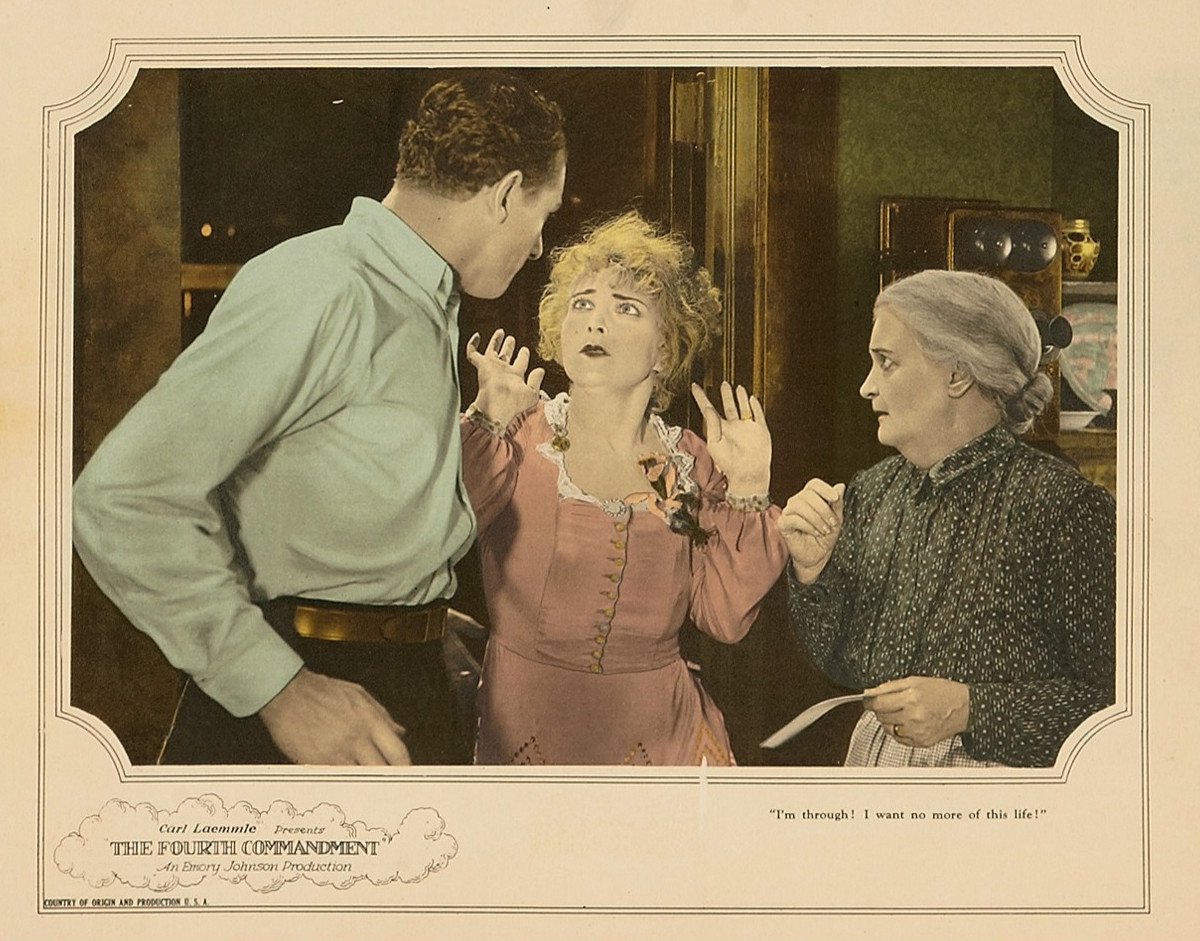
- Lobby card
- Directed by: Emory Johnson
- Written by: Emory Johnson (adaptation); Carroll Owen (titles)
- Produced by: Carl Laemmle
- Starring: Belle Bennett
- Cinematography: Arthur L. Todd
- Distributed by: Universal Pictures
- Release date: March 20, 1927
- Running time: 6-7 reels (2,091.84 meters)
- Country: United States
- Language: Silent (English intertitles

The Fourth Commandment is a 1927 American silent drama film directed by Emory Johnson and based on the short story "The Fourth Commandment" by Emilie Johnson. The film stars Belle Bennett, Henry Victor, June Marlowe, and Mary Carr. The film was released on March 20, 1927, by Universal Pictures. The Fourth Commandment is - "Honor your father and your mother. . ."

== Plot ==
The Graham family falls on hard times. A childhood love affair between Gordon Graham, played by Malcolm Jones, and Marjorie Miller, played by Lorraine Rivero, is squashed by Marjorie's mother, the social climber Mrs. Miller played by Catherine Wallace.

Gordon, now played by Henry Victor, goes away to college, returns home, and marries Virginia, played by Belle Bennett. Four years after their child's birth, Sonny (Wendell Phillips Franklin), Virginia, no longer wants to be a stay-at-home mom. She wants to return to the workforce. Virginia's mother-in-law, Mrs. Graham, played by Mary Carr, makes an offer to the couple. Gordon and Virginia can move in with her, and she will take care of Sonny.

After living awhile with Mrs. Graham, selfish Virginia becomes jealous of her mother-in-law's devotion to her son. She issues an ultimatum – Gordon's mother goes, or she will leave. Gordon can't kick his mother out of her house. Frustrated, Virginia takes Sonny, moves out, and gets a divorce. Virginia then sets her sights on her wealthy boss - Frederick Stoneman, played by Frank Elliott. They get married. Later Stoneman is found guilty of embezzlement and sent to prison. Virginia is now destitute, unmarried, and no future prospects.

Sonny, played by Robert Agnew, is now a grown man and happily married. Sonny arranged for his poor mother to live with him and his wife. Soon Sonny's wife becomes jealous of Virginia's devotion to her son. Sonny and his wife move to Paris and take Virginia with them. Virginia has trouble dealing with the demands of Sonny's wife. The circle is now complete; Virginia decides to disappear in the streets of Paris.

Gordon and his wife, Marjorie, are attending a business function in Paris. They are recognized on the streets of Paris by a haggard-looking woman. As the mystery woman walks to greet them, Virginia dies in the street.

== Cast ==
Actor	Role
Henry Victor	Gordon Graham
June Marlowe	Marjorie Miller
Belle Bennett	Virginia
Leigh Willard	Edmund Graham
Mary Carr	Mrs. Graham
Brady Kline	Ray Miller
Catherine Wallace	Mrs. Miller
Frank Elliott	Frederick Stoneman
Knute Erickson	John Malloy
Kathleen Myers	Mrs. Smith
Robert Agnew	Sonny
Wendell Phillips Franklin	Sonny, as a child
Lorraine Rivero	Marjorie, as a child
Malcolm Jones	Gordon, as a child
Stanley Taylor	Count Douglas Von Rosen

== Film name ==
A few periodicals have incorrectly labeled the film as - FOURTH COMMANDMENT. The final determination can be made by company's registration with the US government office of copyrights. Shown below is the entry from the Catalog of Copyright Entries-Cumulative Series dated 1951 -

THE FOURTH COMMANDMENT 1926
8 reels
Credits: Story, Emilie Johnson
(c) Universal Pictures Corp.; 14 Oct 26
LP23239

— Catalog of Copyright Entries

== Preservation status ==
A report created by film historian and archivist David Pierce for the Library of Congress claims:

- 75% of original silent-era films have perished.
- 14% of the 10,919 silent films released by major studios exist in their original 35mm or other formats.
- 11% survive in full-length foreign versions or on film formats of lesser image quality. Many silent-era films did not survive for reasons as explained on this Wikipedia page.

Emory Johnson directed 13 films - 11 were silent, and 2 were Talkies. The Fourth Commandment was the first film in Emory Johnson's eight-picture contract with Universal. The film's original length is listed at 8 reels. According to the Library of Congress website, this film has the status of:

- Archive: BFI / National Film And Television Archive (London) [Gbb], Library of Congress (Washington) [Usw]
- Holdings: Foreign Archive
- Completeness: complete
- Note: Digital files produced from 16mm print on loan from a private collector: Usw
- Note: BFI is 35mm incomplete

Copies of this movie are not available on YouTube, movie vendors, or the Internet Archive.

== Gallery ==
Players and director
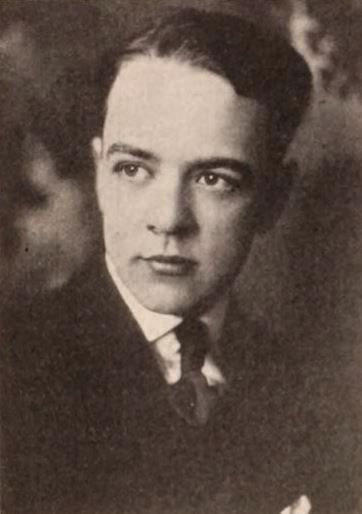
Robert Agnew
Sonny

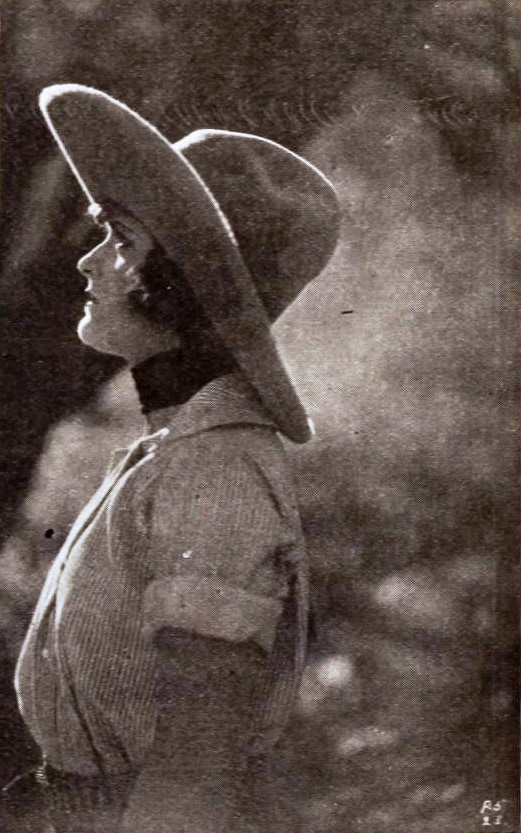
Kathleen Myers
Mrs. Smith

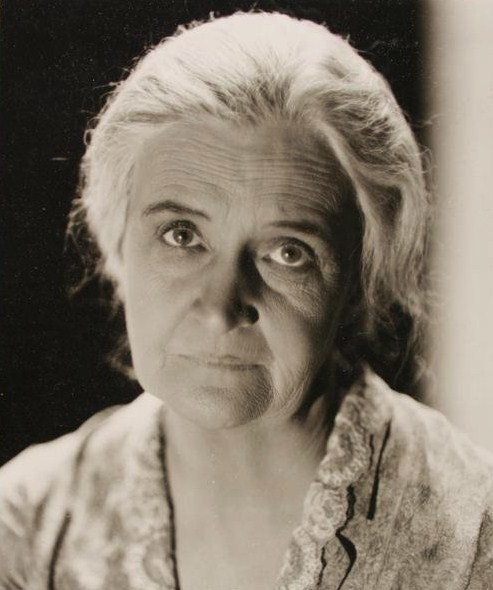
Mary Carr
Mrs. Graham

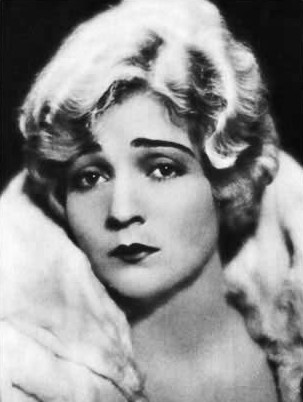
Belle Bennett
Virginia

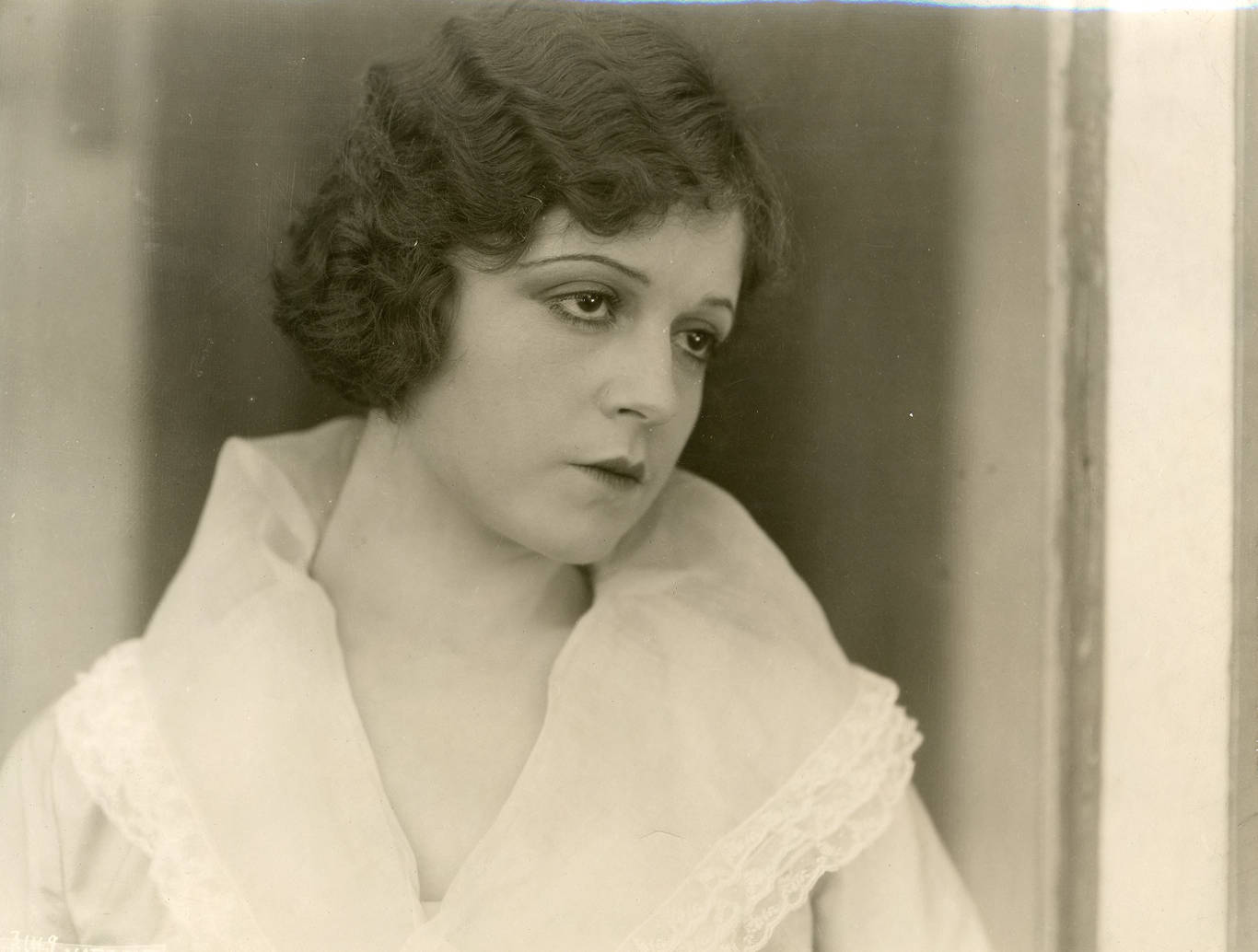
June Marlowe
Marjorie Miller

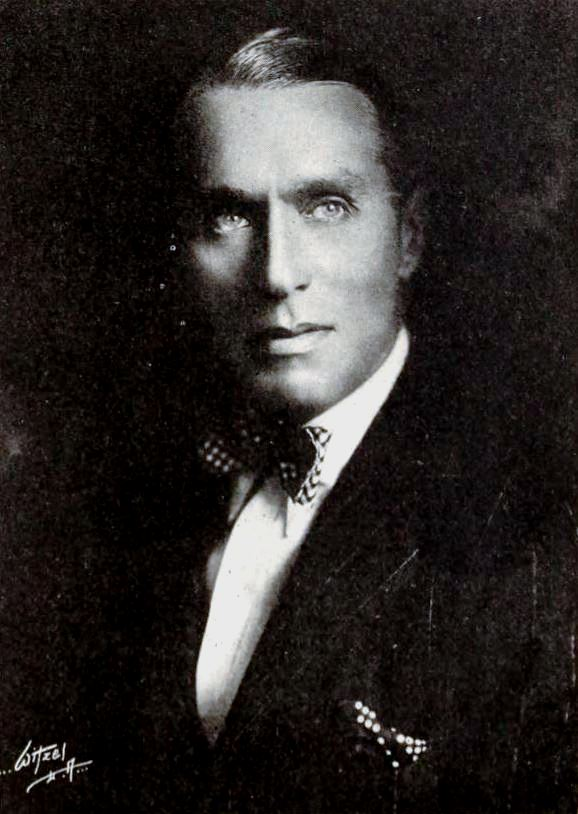
Frank Elliott
Frederick Stoneman

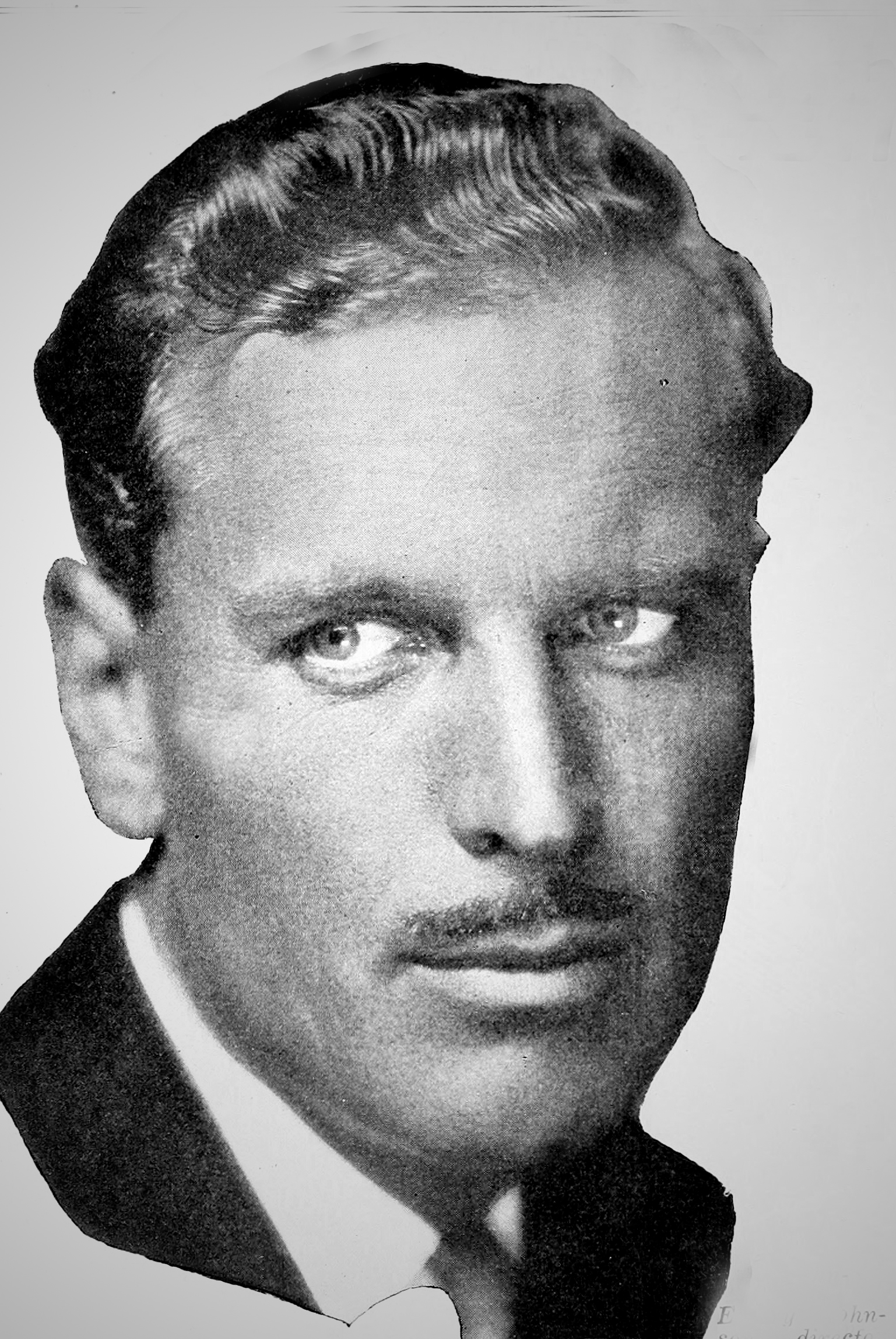
Emory Johnson
Director
Magazine Ads and Covers
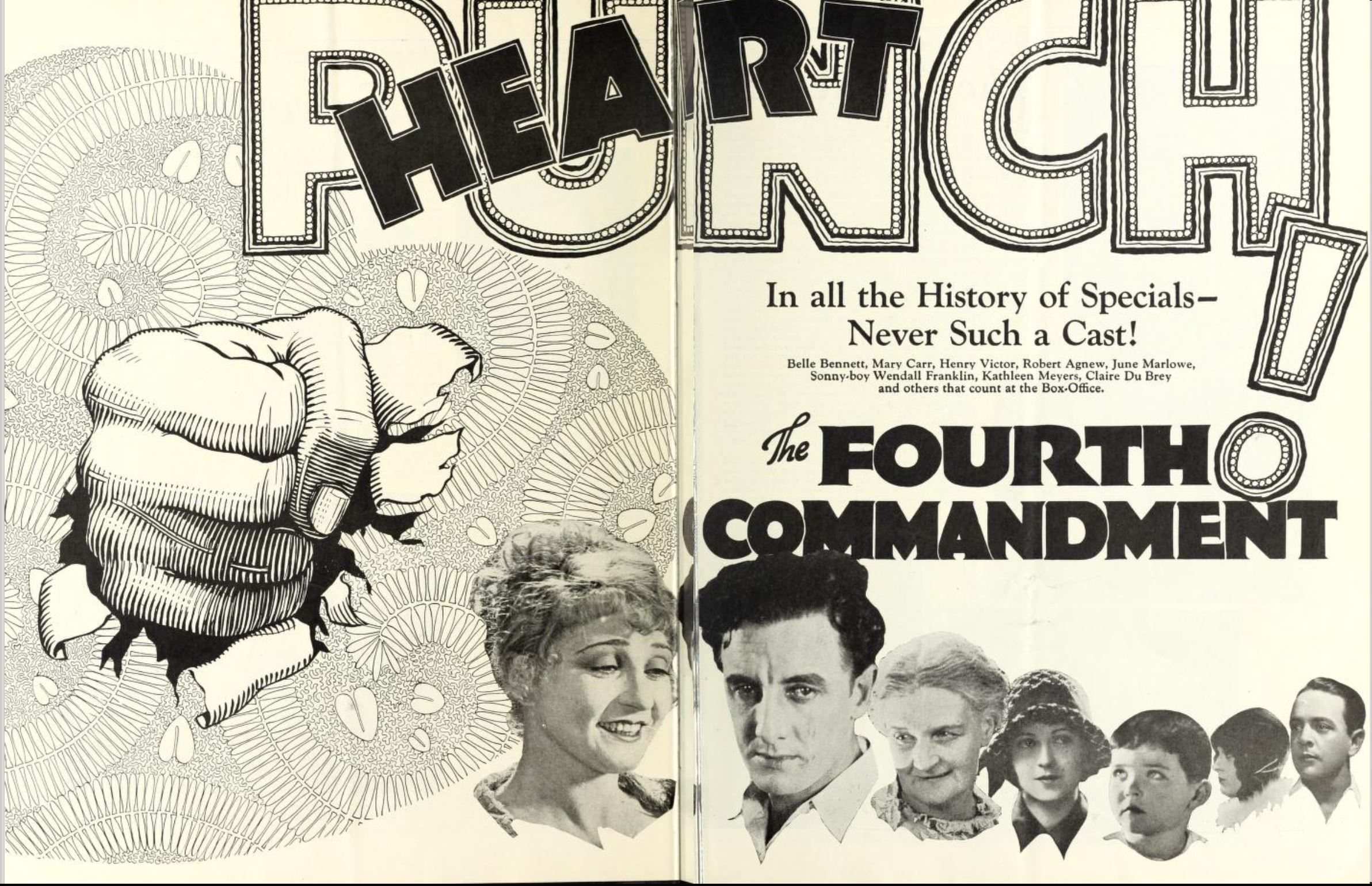

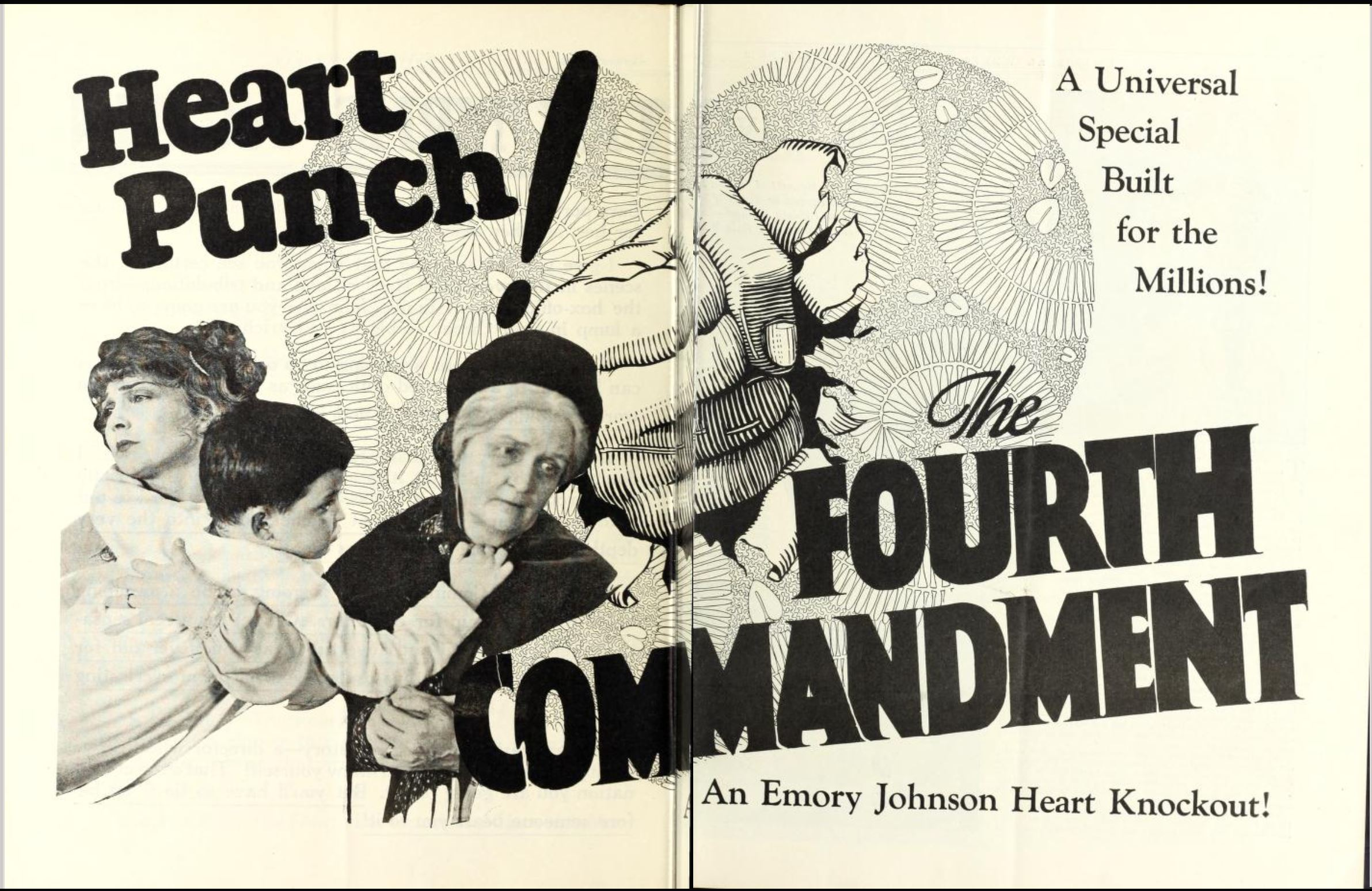

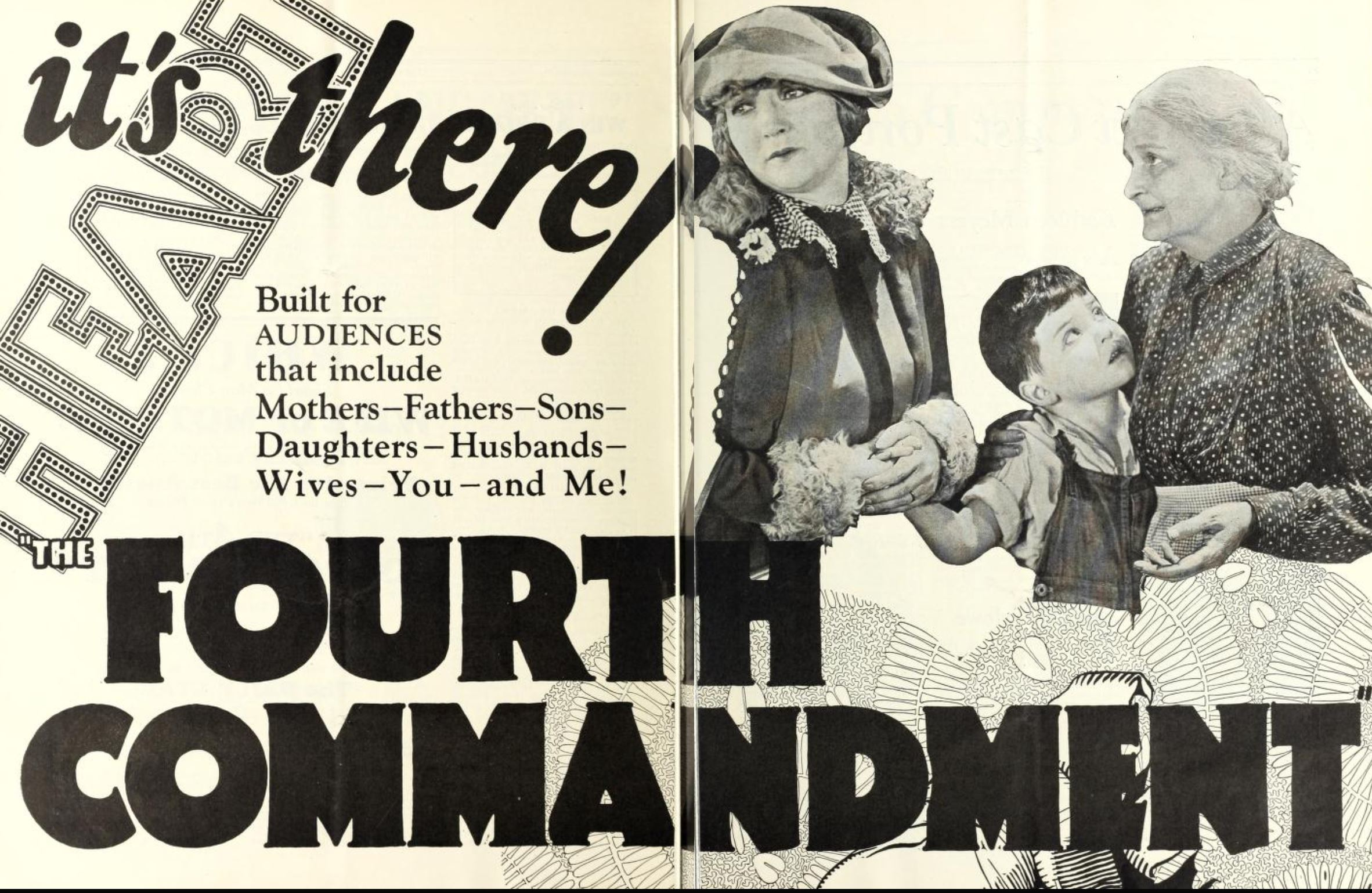

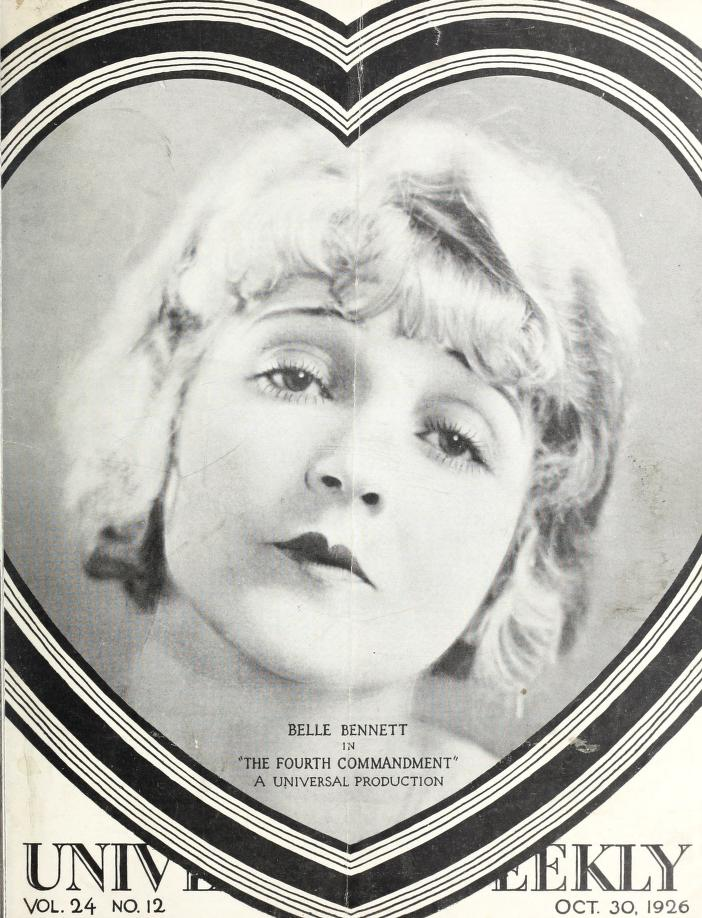
