= Accused (1925 film) =

1925 film directed by Dell Henderson

- Directed by: Dell Henderson
- Written by: Roy Briant
- Produced by: Jesse J. Goldburg
- Starring: Marcella Daly; Eric Mayne; Charles Delaney
- Production company: Independent Pictures
- Distributed by: Independent Pictures
- Release date: December 3, 1925
- Running time: 50 minutes
- Country: United States
- Language: Silent (English intertitles)

Accused is a 1925 American silent drama film directed by Dell Henderson and starring Marcella Daly, Eric Mayne, and Charles Delaney.

== Plot ==
As described in a film magazine review, Helen, reared as the daughter of the kindly Cyrus Braidwood, discovers that her real father is the crook Lait Rodman, overwhom Braidwood holds a confession of complicity in the death of his wife. Rodman obtains possession of the incriminating document. Helen secretly enters Rodman's apartment to search for the vanished paper and encounters Steve Randall, a wealthy young bachelor. Each takes the other as being a crook. They become trapped in the thieves' underground den which becomes flooded, and they barely escape. Matters are finally adjusted and the two agree to wed.

== Cast ==
- Marcella Daly as Helen
- Eric Mayne as Cyrus Braidwood
- Charles Delaney as Steve Randall
- Charles K. Gerrard as Lait Rodman
- Miss DuPont as Rose Bailey
- Sheldon Lewis as Bull McLeod
- Spottiswoode Aitken as Eagle Eye

== Preservation ==
A complete copy of Accused is held by the Library of Congress.

== Bibliography ==
- Connelly, Robert B. The Silents: Silent Feature Films, 1910-36, Volume 40, Issue 2. December Press, 1998.
- Munden, Kenneth White. The American Film Institute Catalog of Motion Pictures Produced in the United States, Part 1. University of California Press, 1997.
