= Pursued (1925 film) =

- Directed by: Dell Henderson
- Written by: J. Benson Stafford
- Produced by: William T. Lackey
- Release date: August 30, 1925
- Running time: 50 minutes
- Country: United States
- Language: English

Pursued is an American action drama film that was released on August 30, 1925. It was distributed by Ellbee Pictures. It was produced by William T. Lackey, directed by Dell Henderson and written by J. Benson Stafford.

It was described in 1927 as "one of the most thrilling and entertaining photoplays of the year, say film critics who have seen the picture."

== Plot ==
Dorothy Drew is assisting in rescuing her boyfriend, Gaston Glass, who is an assistant district attorney, abducted by a gang of murderers. After locating the gang's hideout, by posing as the notorious female gangster, Chicago Ann, who always dresses in male clothing, Drew succeeds in having the gang leader drawn to her, but his gun moll exposes the impersonation. Drew is captured and held prisoner. The place is then raided. Glass rescued.

TCM's synopsis:

Dick Manning, an assistant district attorney, who is on the track of a gang of murderers, is abducted while visiting his sweetheart, Helen Grant. Helen's police dog tracks down the abductors, and Helen goes to their den, passing herself off as Chicago Ann, a notorious female gangster who dresses in men's clothing. The leader of the gang is attracted to Helen, but his jealous sweetheart exposes her as a fraud. Helen is made prisoner, but she manages to escape with the help of a friendly gangster. Helen alerts the police, and the den is raided in time to save Dick's life.

== Cast ==
- Dorothy Drew as Helen Grant
- Gaston Glass as Dick Manning
- Lafe McKee as the District Attorney
- Gertrude Astor as Madame La Grande
- Stuart Holmes as Robert Killifer
- Arthur Rankin as Harry, the kid
- Marcella Daly
- George Siegmann
