= Peggy O'Neil =

Irish-American Vaudville actress

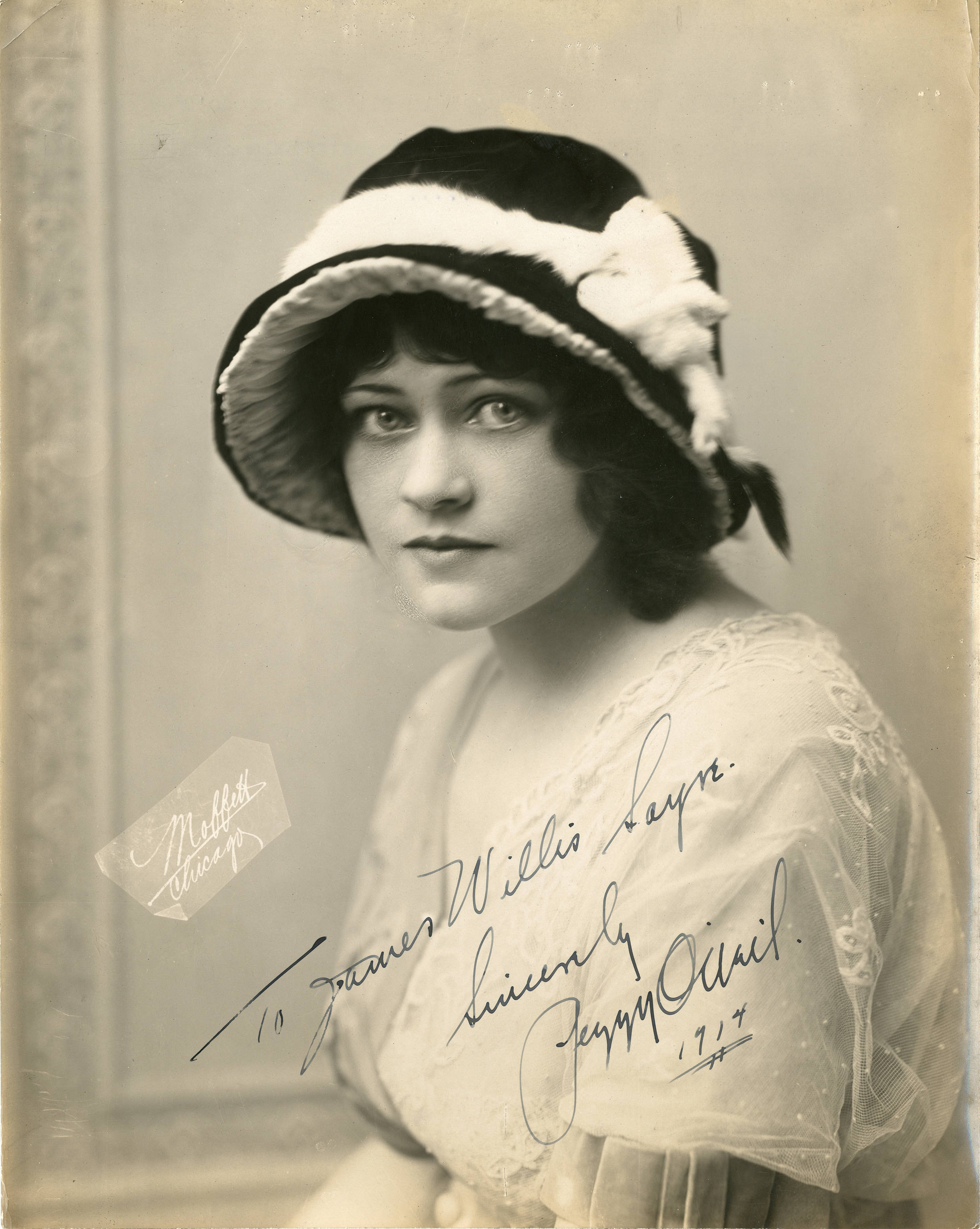
- O'Neil c. 1914
- Born: Margaret O'Neil; 16 June 1898; Gneeveguilla, County Kerry, Ireland
- Died: 7 January 1960 (aged 61); London, England
- Occupation: Actress
- Years active: 1913–1938

Margaret O'Neil (16 June 1898 – 7 January 1960) was an Irish-American vaudeville actress.

== Childhood ==
Her family migrated at the turn of the century from Ireland to Canada, soon moving to Buffalo, New York. It is unclear whether Peggy was born there or in Ireland.("I am Irish – impulse rather than reason guided me"). O'Neil attended a Loreto convent school. At the age of nine, her father Frederick died in a train wreck, her mother Mary Buckley O'Neill died three years later. Peggy came under the care of local relatives. An uncle named Charlie Zimmerman, a music director, encouraged her artistic talent and took to theater choirs. He also cast as a choral singer in the play "The Sweetest Girl in Paris", the opening play for the newly rebuilt La Salle Theater in Chicago in 1910.

== Career ==
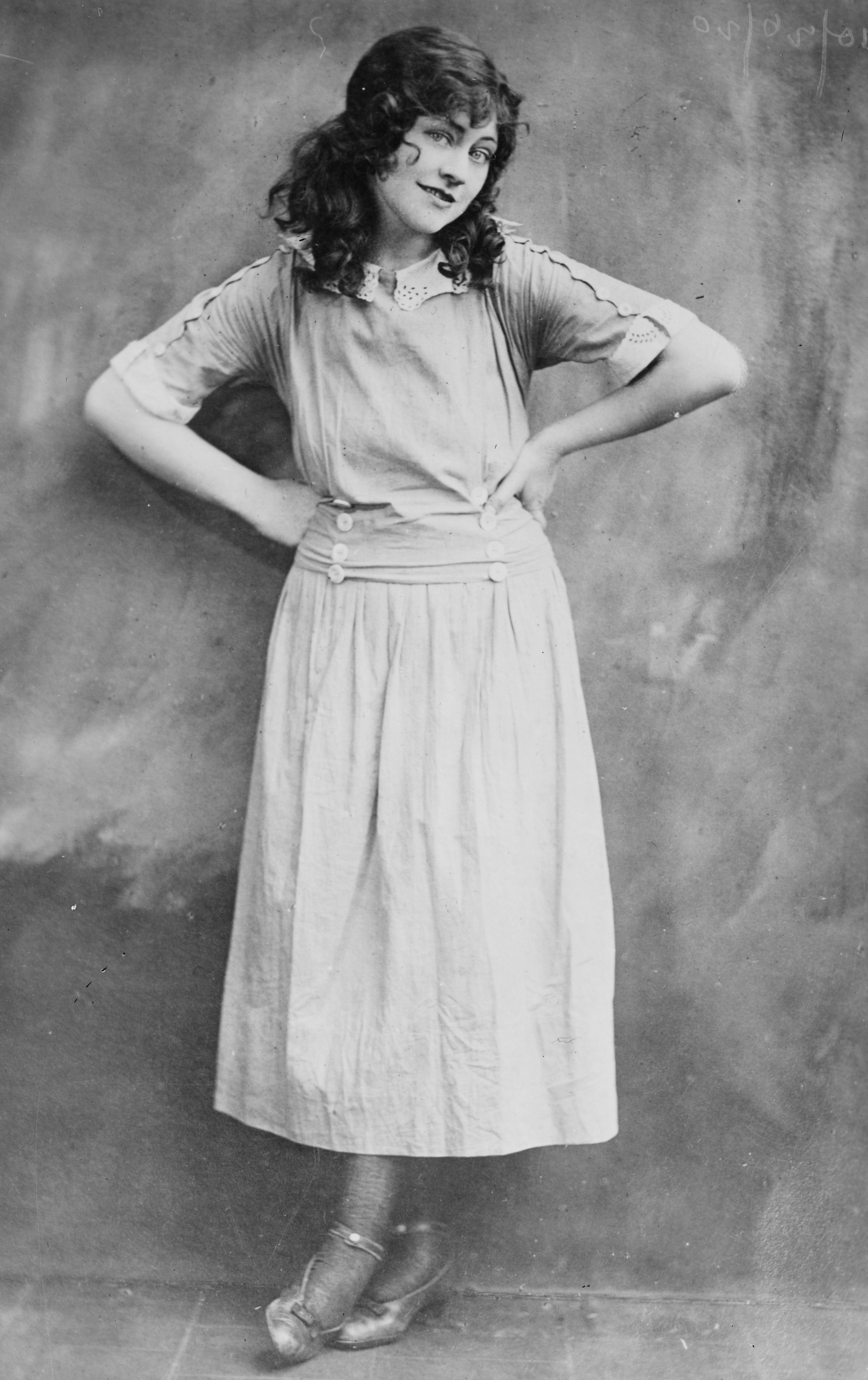
Peggy O'Neil, 1920

O'Neil acted in several plays until her career met a turning point in 1919. A "particularly Irish actress with red hair" was sought for a London play. Robert Courtneidge a producer who travelled to the United States, met O'Neil. She then went to London to play the role of Paddy in Gertrude Page's Paddy the Next Best Thing. She fell in love with the city and made the decision to spend the rest of her life there. This move delayed her engagement to the US millionaire Joe Moran. In the following years she was a welcome guest on English speaking stages.

In October 1920, it was announced that an assassination attempt had been made against O'Neill. A chocolate present contained the poisons arsenic and strychnine. She survived the attack, but her dog died. No culprit was identified.

In the autumn of 1928, at the National Radio Exhibition she noticed John Logie Baird's television in the Olympia, London. There she was invited to perform some Irish songs, which helped to popularise the invention. This helped the new medium to gain additional popularity. She was also the first person who has ever been interviewed on television. The conversation took place in April 1930 on the occasion of the Ideal Home Exhibition in Southampton.

O'Neill appeared in small supporting roles in films from 1913, and by 1938 had played a role in 23 feature-length and short films. Roles in The Razor's Edge, Let's Dance and (body doubling for Ingrid Bergman) Joan of Arc followed.

As a painter, she presented three oil paintings to the public Wertheim Gallery and Burlington Gardens.

In the 1930s, O'Neil suffered financially and physically. In 1935 she had to declare bankruptcy, which she put down to inexperience and carelessness.

== Later years and death ==
From the mid-1940s, she was increasingly plagued by arthritic pain, which soon led to her being unable to leave home and relying on a wheelchair. She died impoverished on 7 January 1960 at Middlesex Hospital in London from heart failure. She was laid to rest in the St Pancras and Islington Cemetery. The Actors' Benevolent Fund paid for the funeral. However, there is no grave stone. which points to the grave. O'Neil died unmarried and had no children.

== Peggy O'Neil song ==
In 1921, Harry Pease, Ed. G. Nelson and Gilbert Dodge wrote the waltz Peggy O'Neil ("Peggy O'Neil is a girl who could steal any heart, anywhere ...") published by Leo Feist. The song became very popular, and was covered several times.

== Theater ==
=== United States ===
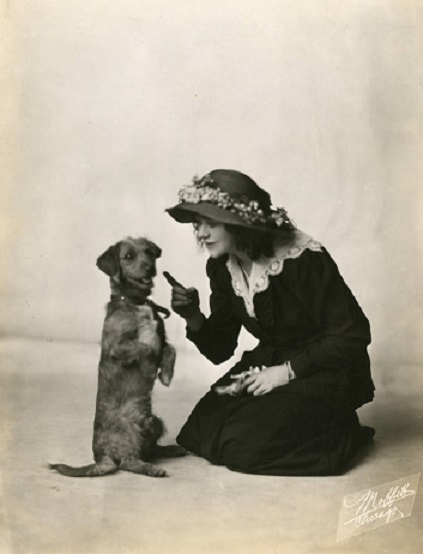
Peggy O'Neil in Peg o' My Heart

- 1910: The Sweetest Girl in Paris (La Salle Theater, Chicago), as a child chorister
- 1914: Peg O' My Heart (chosen from a casting of 400 young applicants)
- 1916: The Flame (Lyric Theatre, Broadway)
- 1918: Patsy on the Wing (in Chicago)
- 1919: Tumble
- 1927: Ziegfeld Follies (in New Amsterdam Theatre)

=== Europa ===
- 1920: Paddy The Next Best Thing (im Savoy Theatre, London), Hauptrolle
- 1922: Kippers and Kings (im Theatre Royal (Dublin))
- 1924: The Little Minister (by J. M. Barrie)
- 1924: What Every Woman Knows (dito)
- 1925: Mercenary Mary (by William B. Friedlander) (Hippodrome, London)
- 1928: The Flying Squad (by Edgar Wallace; Lyceum Theatre (London))
- The Sea Urchin (im Gaiety Theatre (Dublin))
- 1929: Paddy The Next Best Thing, Revival (Garrick Theatre (London))
- 1930: The Bachelor Father (dito)
- 1930: When Dreams come True (Olympia Theatre, London), (Theatre Royal, Birmingham) (advert page 149), (Gaiety Theatre, Dublin)
- 1931: Sisters, a Drama of Laughter, Tears and Romance
- 1934: No Surrender (Theatre Royal, Brighton)
- End of the 1930s: Meet my Wife
- 1943: They Gave Him a Gun (im Theatre Royal, Brighton), Kriegsdrama
- 1943: Tainted Gods (Leeds City Varieties, Leeds)

== Film ==
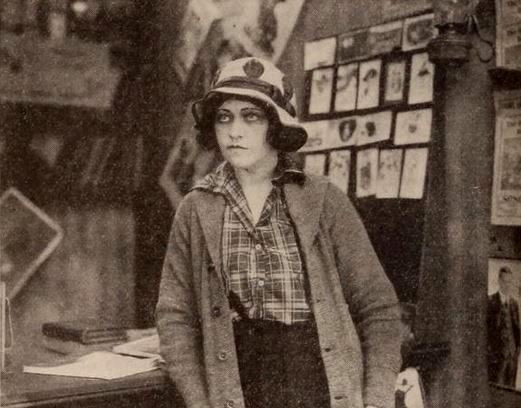
Peggy O'Neil in The Penny Philanthropist

Small supporting roles in:

- 1945: The Unexpected Husband
- 1946: The Razor's Edge
- 1948: Joan of Arc (body double for Ingrid Bergman)
- 1950: Let's Dance

== Literature ==
- Murphy, Janet (2017). The Girl from Gneeveguilla. Lulu.com. ISBN 978-1-3269-5360-7. - Memoirs
- Schmidt, Eugene (2014). Whispering Jack & Peggy 'O'. Mustang, Oklahoma: Tate. ISBN 978-1-62854-928-7. - fictionalised account of O'Neil's work with Whispering Jack Smith
