= Knute Erickson =

American comedian and character actor

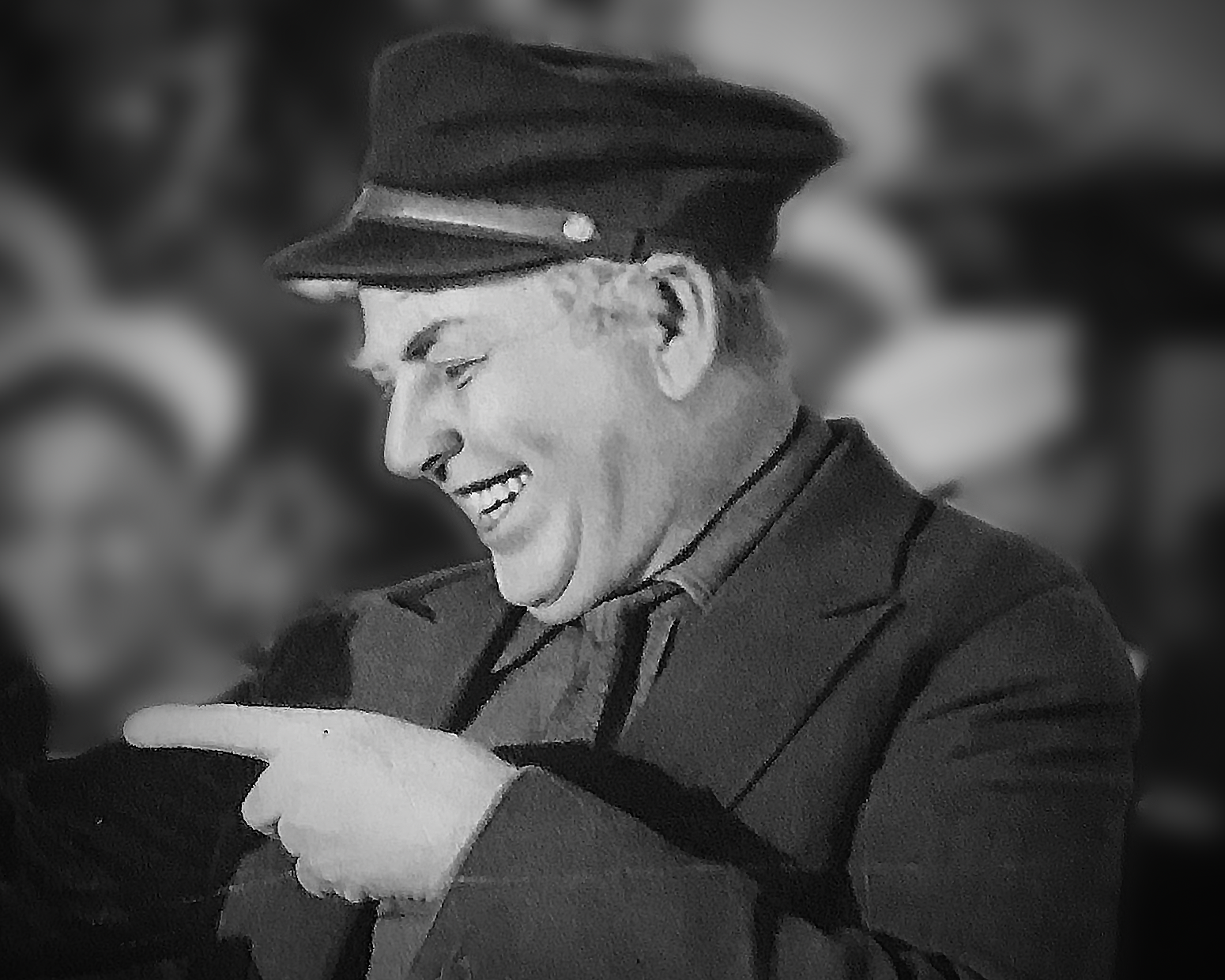
- Erickson in The Non-Stop Flight, 1926
- Born: Knut Timar Carlsson Eriksson; May 27, 1873; Norrköping, Sweden or Ogden, Utah, U.S. (disputed)
- Died: December 31, 1945 (aged 72); Los Angeles, California, U.S
- Occupations: Vaudeville comedian; character actor

Knute Erickson (born Knut Timar Carlsson Eriksson; May 27, 1873 – December 31, 1945) was a Swedish-American vaudeville comedian and character actor.

== Life and career ==
Sources differ regarding his origins. Some state that he was born as Carl Erickson in 1872 in Ogden, Utah, to Swedish immigrant parents, but there is firm evidence, from birth records and his passport applications, that he was born as Knut Timar Carlsson Eriksson in Norrköping, Sweden in 1873, emigrating to the United States with his parents in 1881.

He grew up in Salt Lake City, and worked backstage at a local theatre before moving to New York City to study dramatics. He first appeared on Broadway in 1894, playing with Mack Swain, and appeared in other roles as a Swedish character. In the early 1900s, he developed Swedish immigrant characters, "Yon Yonson", and, more successfully, "Daffy Dan", whom he performed in vaudeville in shows produced by Jesse Lasky. He performed in character in two short silent films produced in 1915.

While continuing to perform in vaudeville, he also became established after 1921 in minor character roles in Hollywood, starting with Gasoline Gus in which he appeared with Roscoe Arbuckle. Over the next fifteen years he appeared in over thirty more films, mostly in small parts and sometimes uncredited. These included performances in The Monster with Lon Chaney in 1925, The Non-Stop Flight in 1926, and The Bitter Tea of General Yen, directed by Frank Capra in 1933.

Erickson died in Los Angeles in 1945.

== Gallery ==
Character Actor Knute Erickson

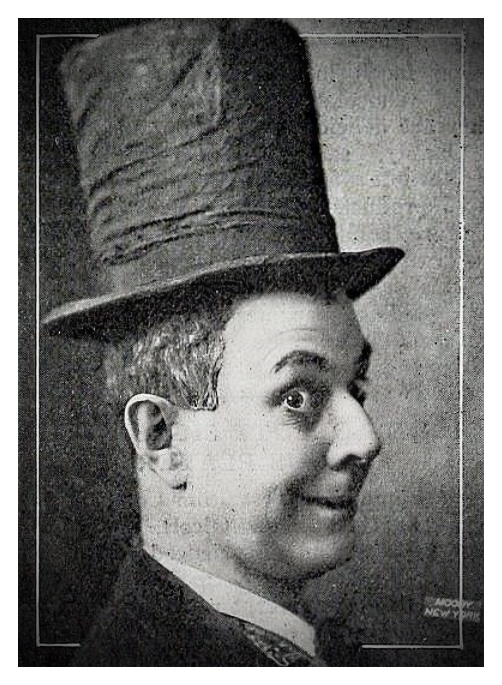
Knute Erickson
Daffy Dan
1915

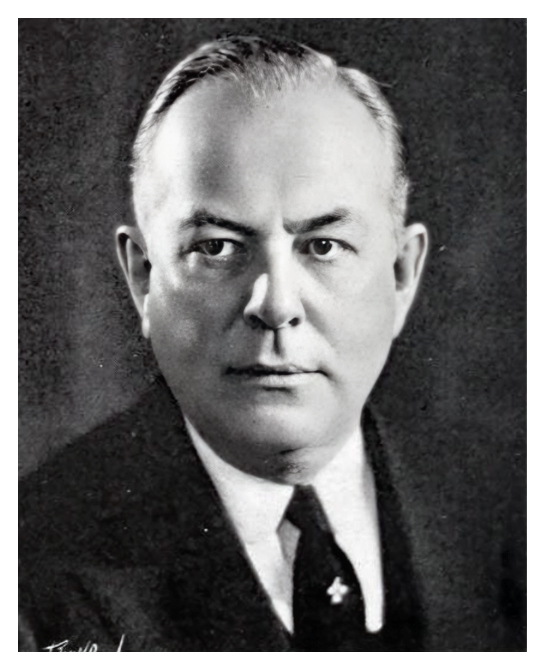
Knute Erickson
Casting Directory
May 1925

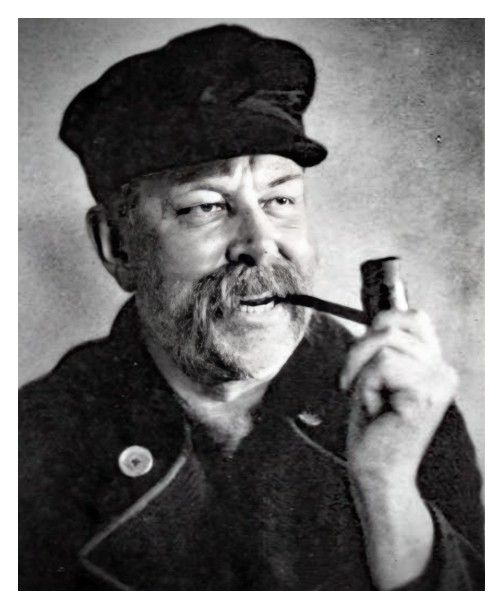
Knute Erickson
Casting Directory
Jul 1925

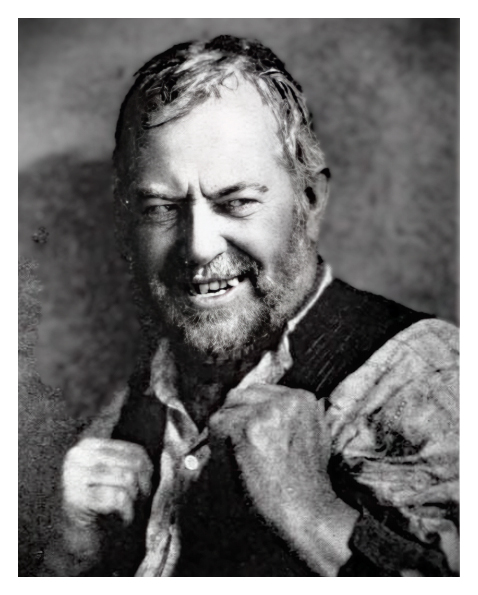
Knute Erickson
Casting Directory
Feb 1925
