= Silent Star (disambiguation) =

Silent Star is silent film star Colleen Moore's autobiography.

Silent Star or Silent star may also refer to:

- The Silent Star, a 2004 English-language version of the 1960 Polish/German film Milcząca Gwiazda (German: Der Schweigende Stern)
- A silent film star
- Silent Star: The Story of Deaf Major Leaguer William Hoy, a biography of Dummy Hoy by Bill Wise
- Silent Star, a character in The Legend of Valentino
- "Silent Star", a track from CM Yoko studio album by Yoko Kanno
- Silent Star, a 2011 studio album by Bernward Koch
- Silent Star, a 2003 book by Tracie Peterson
