= Sally (1925 film) =

1925 film

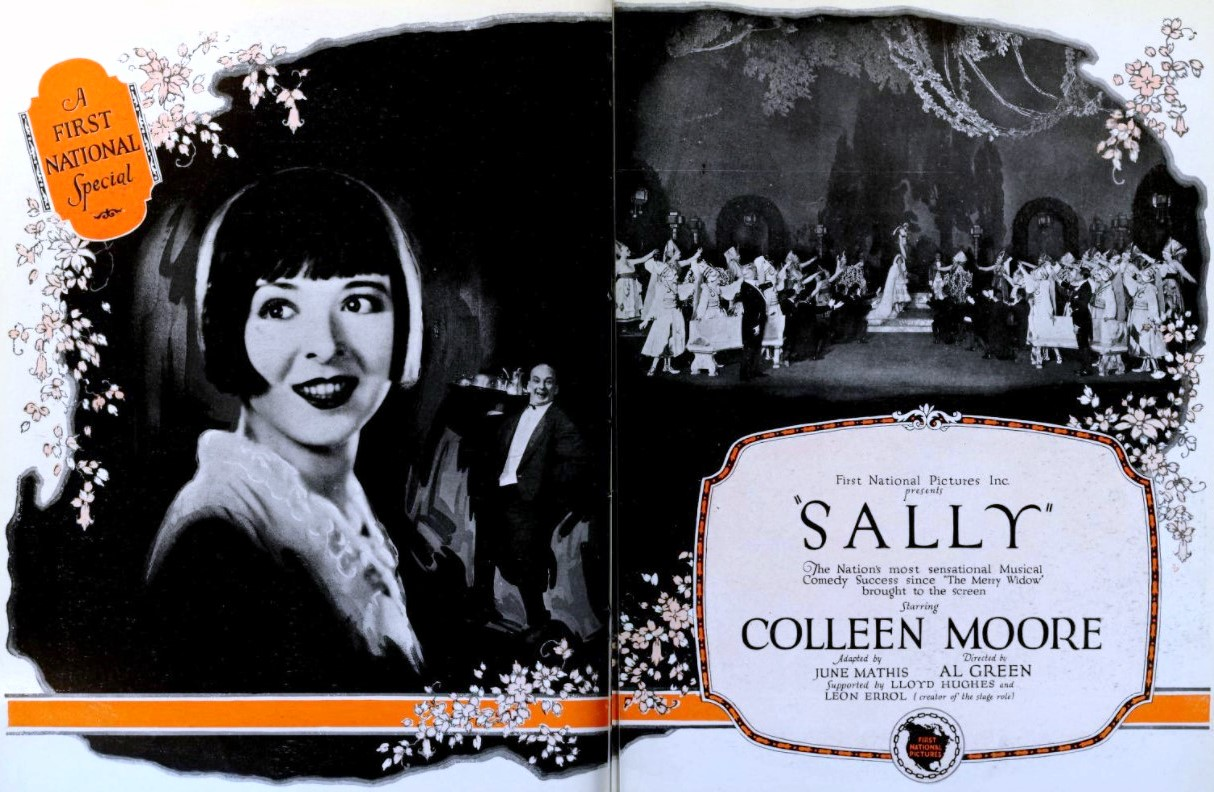
- Advertisement
- Directed by: Alfred E. Green
- Written by: June Mathis
- Based on: Sally; 1920 musical by Guy Bolton and Clifford Grey
- Produced by: John McCormick
- Starring: Colleen Moore; Lloyd Hughes; Leon Errol
- Cinematography: Ted D. McCord
- Edited by: George McGuire
- Music by: Harry Tierney; Joseph McCarthy
- Distributed by: First National Pictures
- Release date: March 29, 1925
- Running time: 90 minutes
- Country: United States
- Language: Silent (English intertitles)

Sally is a 1925 American silent romantic comedy film starring Colleen Moore. The film was directed by Alfred E. Green, produced by Moore's husband John McCormick, and based on the musical Sally written by Guy Bolton and Clifford Grey that was adapted to film by June Mathis. The play was a Florenz Ziegfeld Jr. production written specifically for Marilyn Miller that opened on December 21, 1920, at the New Amsterdam Theatre on Broadway. It ran for 570 performances.

== Plot ==
As described in a film magazine review, Sally (Moore), from a foundling asylum, is a dishwasher at a cafe resort in Paris when a refugee, the Duke of Checkergovinia (Errol), is also employed in a like humble capacity, unknown to his fellow workers. Sally again meets Blair Farquar (Hughes), who had rescued her in an alley fight and who has had an affair with the Russian danseuse Noskerova, as had the Duke. Sally has a chance to dance at the cafe and is a success. Otis Hooper (Murray), an American theatrical agent, sees her dance and suggests that Sally pose as a Russian dancer at a fete. She consents and makes a big hit. The proprietor of the inn where she works follows and unmasks her, and she is greatly humiliated. Ziegfeld had been present, however, and she is offered a contract for Broadway. A reconciliation follows between Sally and Blair.

== Cast ==
- Colleen Moore as Sally
- Lloyd Hughes as Blair Farquar
- Leon Errol as Duke of Checkergovinia
- Dan Mason as Pops Shendorf
- John T. Murray as Otis Hooper
- Eva Novak as Rosie Lafferty / Eleanor Hadley
- Ray Hallor as Jimmy Spelvin
- Carlo Schipa as Sascha Commuski
- Myrtle Stedman as Mrs. Ten Brock
- E.H. Calvert as Richard Farquar (credited as Capt. E.H. Calvert)
- Louise Beaudet as Madame Julie Du Fay
- Richard Arlen (uncredited minor role)
- Joyce Compton (uncredited minor role)
- Betsy Ann Hisle as Little Girl (uncredited)

== Production ==
This was the second of five films, in three years, with Moore and Hughes starring. They also appeared together in The Huntress (1923), The Desert Flower (1925), Irene (1926), and Ella Cinders (1926).

During the production of this film, Moore met a young gag man who worked for Alfred Green who billed himself as a “comedy constructor,” named Mervyn LeRoy. They would become good friends and LeRoy would eventually direct Moore in her 1928 film Oh, Kay!

== Preservation ==
As of a January 2017 update, the combined Library of Congress and International Federation of Film Archives (FIAF) American Silent Feature Film Survival Database reports Sally as a lost film, despite speculation in 2014 that a short sequence of color film, from the nine-reel movie, might have been discovered in "a previously unknown cache of over a dozen 45 - 75 second 35mm Technicolor nitrate spools with previously lost color scenes" from four early films.

== Sources ==
- Jeff Codori (2012), Colleen Moore; A Biography of the Silent Film Star, McFarland Publishing, (Print ISBN 978-0-7864-4969-9, EBook ISBN 978-0-7864-8899-5).
