= So Long Letty =

So Long Letty may refer to:

- So Long Letty (1920 film), a silent American comedy film
- So Long Letty (1929 film), an American pre-Code musical comedy
