= Silent Star =

Silent film star Colleen Moore's autobiography

Silent Star: Colleen Moore Talks About Her Hollywood
- Author: Colleen Moore
- Language: English
- Subject: Autobiography, Silent film
- Publisher: Doubleday & Company
- Publication date: 1968
- Publication place: United States
- Media type: Print
- Pages: 262

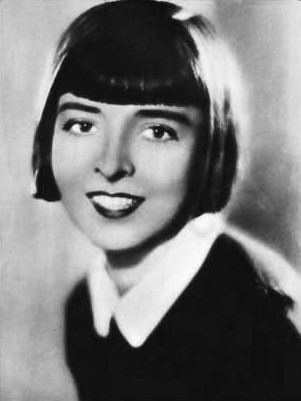
Moore from Stars of the Photoplay (1930)

Silent Star: Colleen Moore Talks About Her Hollywood (1968) is silent film star Colleen Moore's autobiography.

== Content ==
The book was written after the death of her third husband, Homer Hargrave. It was likely written with the help of Moore's friend Adela Rogers St. Johns. Moore is often either identified as "me" or "Colleen Moore," indicating more than one person wrote the captions in the book's photo captions. The book covered her life from birth until the point it was written, and was a "tell-all" in that she shattered many myths that had developed around her during her film career. Among the admissions Moore made in the book was that her break in films came as a result of her uncle Walter Howey cashing in debt owed him by D. W. Griffith. She described her marriage to John McCormick (1893–1961) as rocky as a result of his alcoholism.

Born in Port Huron, Michigan, Moore mentions that she had known she wanted to be a motion picture star from a very young age. She wrote that she kept a scrapbook of her favorite stars and left a few pages blank at the end for her own photographs. A year later, she would donate her own scrapbooks to the Academy of Motion Picture Arts and Sciences, where they are currently available for viewing by researchers at the Academy's Margaret Herrick Library.

In the book, Moore gave her impressions on several of Hollywood's biggest controversies, including:

- the William Desmond Taylor murder (Moore had been on a double date with Mary Miles Minter before the murder);
- the Roscoe Arbuckle trials (Moore's uncle Walter Howey, a Hearst Corporation editor, had fanned public outrage against Arbuckle);
- the suicide of Paul Bern, husband of Jean Harlow, (Moore attended their wedding); and
- the death of Rudolph Valentino (who Moore was never too impressed by).

While she provides no information that wasn't already known about these scandals, she does recount her feelings about the events at the time.

The book also spends some time constructing and tour of her dollhouse for charity before the Second World War. The dollhouse is currently on display at the Museum of Science and Industry in Chicago.

== Publication ==
Silent Star was published by Doubleday & Company in 1968. The book has 262 pages with many photographs and is currently out of print.

== Bibliography ==
- Codori, Jeff (2012). Colleen Moore: A Biography of the Silent Film Star. McFarland & Company. ISBN 978-0-7864-4969-9. Archived from the original on August 4, 2011. Also available as ebook (ISBN 978-0-7864-8899-5).
