= Ella Cinders (film) =

1926 film by Alfred E. Green

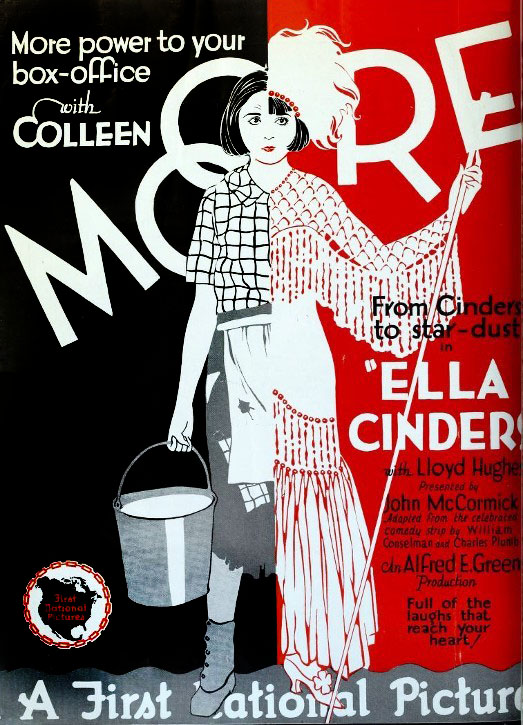
- Theatrical release poster
- Directed by: Alfred E. Green
- Written by: Frank Griffin (scenario); Mervyn LeRoy (scenario); George Marion Jr. (titles)
- Story by: Frank Griffin; Mervyn LeRoy
- Based on: Ella Cinders by William M. Conselman and Charles Plumb
- Produced by: John McCormick
- Starring: Colleen Moore; Lloyd Hughes
- Cinematography: Arthur Martinelli
- Edited by: Robert Kern
- Production company: John McCormick Productions
- Distributed by: First National Pictures
- Release date: June 6, 1926
- Running time: 75 minutes
- Country: United States
- Language: Silent (English intertitles)

Ella Cinders is a 1926 American silent comedy film directed by Alfred E. Green, starring Colleen Moore, produced by her husband John McCormick, and featuring Moore's recurring co-star (five films in three years), Lloyd Hughes. The film is based on the syndicated comic strip of the same name by William M. Conselman and Charles Plumb, which in turn was based upon the millennia-old folk tale of Cinderella.

In 2013, Ella Cinders was selected for preservation in the United States National Film Registry by the Library of Congress as being "culturally, historically, or aesthetically significant". The film has entered the public domain in the United States.

== Plot ==
In the house of her late father in the town of Roseville, Ella Cinders works for her shrewish stepmother, Myrtle "Ma" Cinders, and two stepsisters, Prissy Pill and Lotta Pill, who are beloved in the town but abusive toward Ella. She finds support from the local iceman, Waite Lifter. The Gem Film Company has a contest in which the winner gets an all-expense-paid trip to Hollywood and a film role. Stealing an acting book from Lotta, she works on facial expressions. A photograph is needed to enter, so Ella spends three nights babysitting to raise $3 for the photo session.

Ella Cinders (full movie, public domain)

The photographer unwittingly takes a picture of her looking cross-eyed at a fly on her nose which turns out to be the photo entered in the contest. Entrants must go to a Town Hall ball, but Ma, Prissy and Lotta won't allow her to go. Waite sees her crying on the front steps and tells her he will take her to the ball. She says she has nothing to wear, so he convinces her to use one of her stepsisters' dresses. At the judges' table, Prissy and Lotta react violently when they see the dress. The embarrassed Ella flees the ball, losing one of her slippers. She heads for an employment agency hoping for a new start, only to be placed right back with Ma, who vows to punish her severely.

Later, the judges come to the house and tell Ella that she is the winner because they were amused by the cross-eyed photo and were looking at someone capable of comedy, much to Ella's disappointment at first, and Ma's fury. Ella heads for Hollywood, where she is disappointed to discover the contest was a fraud. Fearing what would happen if she tried to return to Roseville, she decides to stay in Hollywood and break into the industry as an actress the hard way; after substantial rejection and failed attempts to literally break into a studio lot, she succeeds, landing a contract to play the lead role in a rags-to-riches story similar to her own life.

Waite turns out to be football hero and wealthy heir George Waite, who runs to Hollywood, sweeps Ella off her feet on the set, and marries her. The two have a child and live happily ever after.

== Cast ==
- Colleen Moore as Ella Cinders
- Lloyd Hughes as Waite Lifter
- Vera Lewis as Myrtle "Ma" Cinders
- Doris Baker as Lotta Pill
- Emily Gerdes as Prissy Pill
- Mike Donlin as Film Studio Gateman
- Jed Prouty as Mayor
- Jack Duffy as Fire Chief
- Harry Allen as Photographer
- Alfred E. Green as Director
- D'Arcy Corrigan as Editor
- E.H. Calvert as Studio Actor (uncredited)
- Russell Hopton as Studio Actor (uncredited)
- Harry Langdon as Himself (uncredited)
- Chief Yowlachie as Indian (uncredited)

== Production ==
Portions of the film take place on the sets of a movie studio, so many regulars at First National Studios appear in the film. The film's director, Alfred E. Green, appears in the film as the director of the film being shot as Ella Cinders (Colleen Moore) runs through the studio. Harry Langdon also makes a cameo in the film as a famous film comedian who is being directed by a young Frank Capra.

The character of George Waite/Waite Lifter (Lloyd Hughes) was a parody of real-life football star Red Grange, who likewise played at the University of Illinois and worked as an iceman during the offseason. This was the last time that Moore and Hughes starred together in a film, having previously played the leads in The Huntress (1923), Sally (1925), The Desert Flower (1925) and Irene (1926).

== Preservation and home media ==
Copies of Ella Cinders are preserved at the UCLA Film & Television Archive, George Eastman Museum and the Library of Congress.

Ella Cinders is currently held in the public domain. It has since been released on DVD by Sunrise Silents, Reel Classic DVD and Grapevine Video.
