= Oh, Kay! (film) =

1928 film

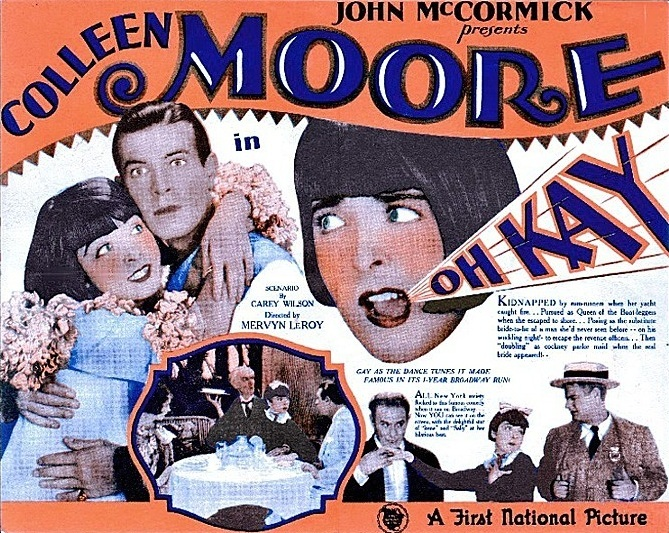
- Directed by: Mervyn LeRoy
- Produced by: John McCormick
- Starring: Colleen Moore
- Cinematography: Sidney Hickox
- Edited by: Paul Weatherwax
- Distributed by: First National Pictures
- Release date: August 26, 1928
- Running time: 6 reels (6,100 feet)
- Country: United States
- Languages: Silent; English intertitles

Oh, Kay! is a 1928 silent film produced by John McCormick and distributed by First National Pictures. McCormick's wife Colleen Moore starred and Mervyn LeRoy directed the film. It is based on the 1926 musical Oh, Kay!, which had music by George Gershwin, lyrics by Ira Gershwin, and a book by Guy Bolton and P. G. Wodehouse.

A copy of the film Oh, Kay! is housed at the EYE Film Institute Netherlands. It is First National's last film released before integration of Warner Bros.

== Story ==
On the eve of her wedding Lady Kay Rutfield runs off aboard her sloop. A storm carries her out to sea and she is rescued by a passing rumrunner bound for the Long Island Sound. Once they arrive in the States, Kay makes her escape and hides in the deserted mansion of Jimmy Winter. Jimmy is due to marry the following day. He comes home to the mansion unexpectedly, and finds Kay, who persuades him to let her pose for a night as his wife. She has mistaken a detective named Jansen for a bootlegger. Shorty, a bootlegger, has hidden some hooch in the basement and, to protect it, passes himself off as the new butler. The following day Jimmy finds himself engaged to Kay and Shorty long gone with his illegal swill.

== Background ==
Based on the 1926 Broadway musical of the same name (several of Colleen's most successful films were based on musical comedies), the story is about the rum running Duke of Durham, forced into his occupation by circumstances beyond his control, and his sister, Lady Kay. They and their assistants—Shorty and Larry—have stashed their load of bootlegged hooch in the basement of the home of Jimmy Winters, a local playboy. Originally part of the rum running operation, the part of Lady Kay was altered to better suit Colleen's screen persona.

Colleen had been set to begin work on When Irish Eyes are Smiling in 1927 when she and her husband John McCormick, split from their studio, possibly over a dispute over McCormick's drinking. The planned director, comedy constructor and friend of Colleen's--Mervyn LeRoy—walked in on a telephone call between John and the Studio as he was quitting, the first sign that the production was in trouble. Colleen followed her husband's departure from First National, and as a result When Irish Eyes are Smiling was shelved (it would be dusted off and made by Colleen as Smiling Irish Eyes, one of her last films, a talkie). Plans for Mervyn LeRoy to direct Colleen were scuttled with her departure. Before her departure from the studio Colleen called Richard Rowland and asked that LeRoy be allowed to direct another film. Richard assured her he would. It was not until Oh Kay! came along that Colleen had the opportunity to be directed by her friend LeRoy. In her book Silent Star, Colleen wrote that while in the vicinity of Catalina Island for shooting scenes of Oh Kay!, she had gone to a movie on the island and seen a handsome actor she recommended to her husband to play the lead in Lilac Time. The actor was Gary Cooper. The play would later be revived.

== Cast ==
- Colleen Moore as Lady Kay
- Lawrence Gray as Jimmy Winter
- Ford Sterling as Shorty McGee
- Claude Gillingwater as Judge Appleton
- Julanne Johnston as Constance Appleton
- Claude King as The Earl of Rutfield
- Edgar Norton as Lord Braggot
- Percy Williams as The butler
- Fred O'Beck as Captain Hornsby

== Footnotes ==
- Jeff Codori (2012), Colleen Moore; A Biography of the Silent Film Star, McFarland Publishing,(Print ISBN 978-0-7864-4969-9, EBook ISBN 978-0-7864-8899-5).
