= Hands Up! (1917 film) =

1917 film

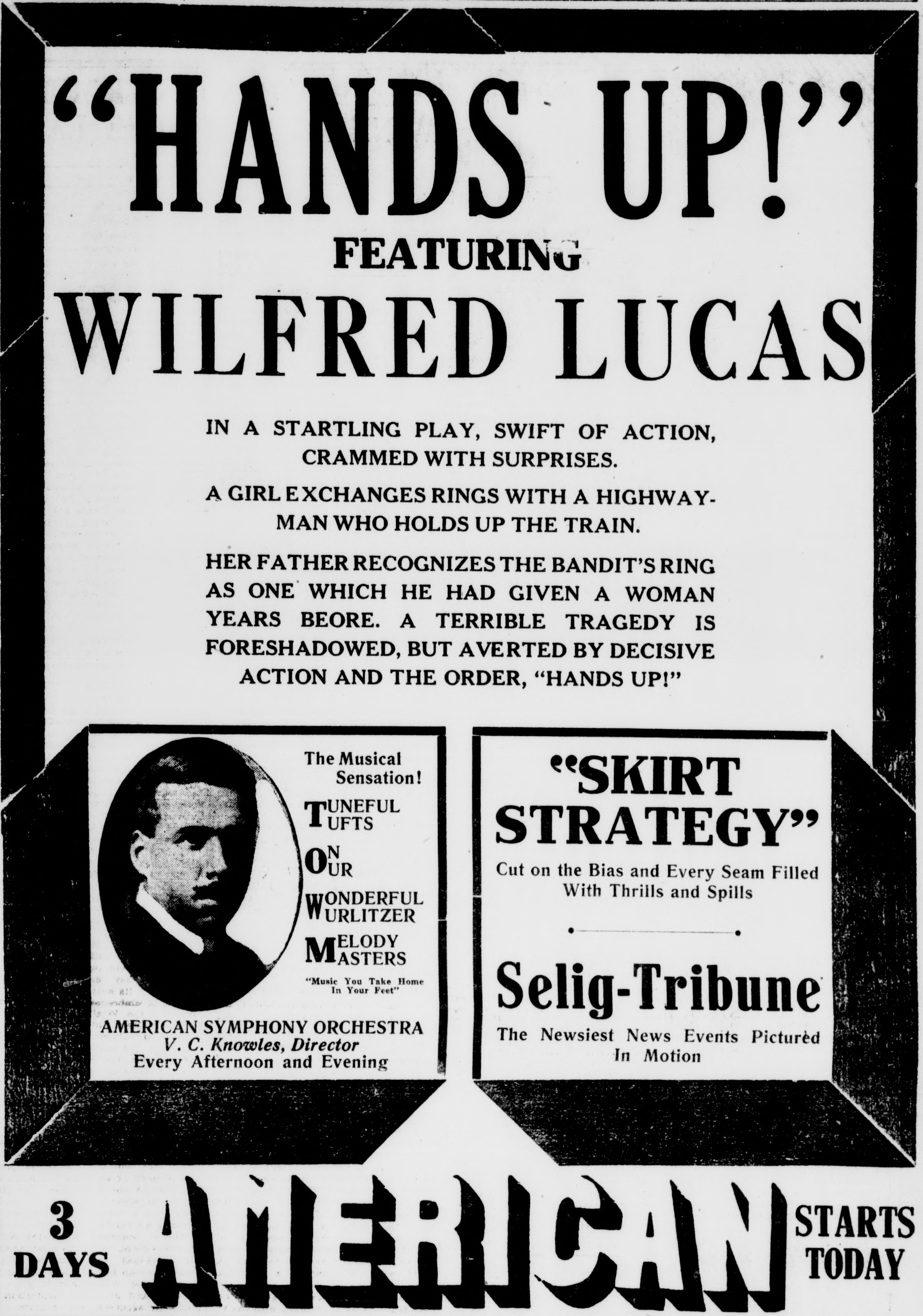
- Newspaper advertisement
- Directed by: Tod Browning; Wilfred Lucas
- Written by: Al J. Jennings; Wilfred Lucas
- Starring: Wilfred Lucas; Colleen Moore
- Release date: April 29, 1917
- Running time: 5 reels
- Country: United States
- Languages: Silent; English intertitles

Hands Up! is a 1917 American silent Western film directed by Tod Browning. This was Colleen Moore's last film for Triangle Film Company/Fine Arts Film Company. D. W. Griffith had withdrawn from the Triangle arrangement and taken many performers and staff, who were under contract specifically with Fine Arts (D. W. Griffith) rather than Triangle. Moore's contract was with Fine Arts. However Griffith had gone to Europe where he made Hearts of the World.

== Cast ==
- Wilfred Lucas as John Houston
- Colleen Moore as Marjorie Houston
- Monte Blue as Dan Tracy
- Beatrice Van as Elinor Craig
- Rhea Haines as Rosanna
- Bert Woodruff as Tim Farley
- Kate Toncray as Mrs. Farley

== Production ==
The scene of Marjorie Houston being kidnapped by Dan Tracy, and rushed down a mountainside on horseback, was filmed on location at Santa Ynez Canyon. Additional scenes were filmed in the Hotel Alexandria's lobby and hallways.

== Bibliography ==
- Jeff Codori (2012), Colleen Moore; A Biography of the Silent Film Star, McFarland Publishing,(Print ISBN 978-0-7864-4969-9, EBook ISBN 978-0-7864-8899-5).
