= Eddie Barry (actor) =

American actor (1887–1966)

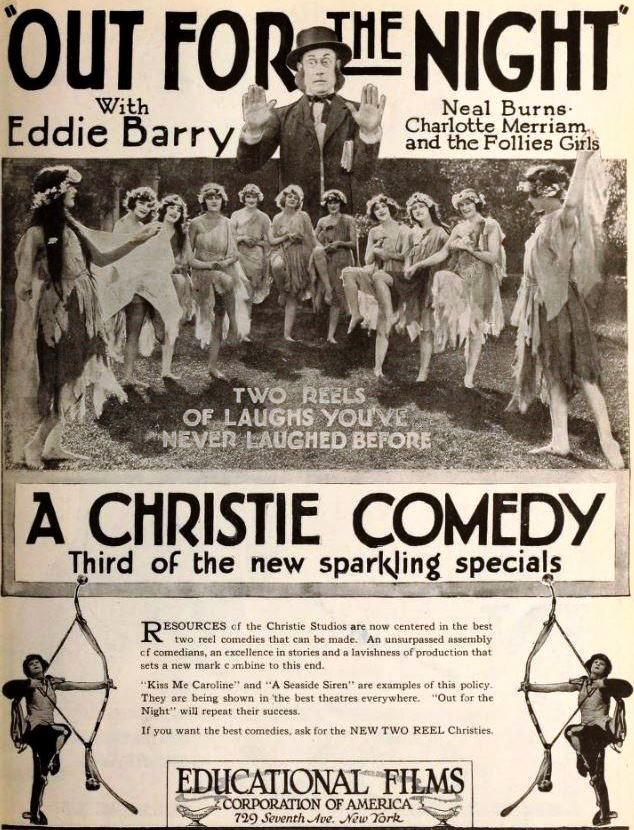
- Ad for Out for the Night (1920)
- Born: October 25, 1887; Philadelphia, Pennsylvania
- Died: August 28, 1966 (aged 78); Newquay, England
- Years active: 1912-1930

Eddie Barry (October 25, 1887 – August 28, 1966) was an American film actor. He appeared in more than 100 films between 1912 and 1930. He was born in Philadelphia, Pennsylvania, and died in Newquay, England. He was the older brother of fellow actor Neal Burns.

== Selected filmography ==
- Clean Sweep (1918)
- Business Before Honesty (1918)
- A Roman Scandal (1919)
- Rowdy Ann (1919)
- Her Bridal Nightmare (1920)
- A Bashful Bigamist (1920)
- Mr. Fatima (1921)
- Crack o' Dawn (1925)
- The Sagebrush Lady (1925)
- Reckless Courage (1925)
- Fighting Luck (1925)
- Red Blood (1925)
- Nifty Numbers (1928)
