= Success at Any Price =

1934 film by J. Walter Ruben

- Film still of Colleen Moore and Douglas Fairbanks, Jr. from Success at Any Price.
- Directed by: J. Walter Ruben
- Screenplay by: John Howard Lawson; Howard J. Green
- Based on: Success Story; 1932 play by John Howard Lawson
- Produced by: Merian C. Cooper (executive producer)
- Starring: Douglas Fairbanks Jr. Genevieve Tobin; Frank Morgan; Colleen Moore
- Cinematography: Henry W. Gerrard
- Edited by: Jack Hively
- Music by: Max Steiner
- Production company: RKO Radio Pictures
- Distributed by: RKO Radio Pictures
- Release date: May 3, 1934
- Running time: 74 minutes
- Country: United States
- Language: English

Success at Any Price is a 1934 American pre-Code drama film starring Douglas Fairbanks Jr., Genevieve Tobin, Frank Morgan and silent film star Colleen Moore. It is based on the 1932 play Success Story by John Howard Lawson.

== Plot ==
Joe, an amoral capitalist and boyfriend of Sarah Griswold, gets a job as a clerk in a New York City advertising agency and starts to work his way to the top. He is fired, but Sarah intervenes on his behalf and he manages to create an ad that earns him a promotion. He meets the mistress of his boss and decides to woo the mistress away. The company is in trouble, but Joe has invested wisely and sells out his boss to his competitor. He abandons Sarah and proposes to the mistress, who marries him. Joe becomes head of his agency, but because he neglects his new wife, she becomes the mistress of another man. He attempts suicide, but Sarah rescues him and nurses him back to health.

== Cast ==
- Douglas Fairbanks, Jr. as Joe Martin
- Genevieve Tobin as Agnes [Carter]
- Frank Morgan as [Raymond] Merritt
- Colleen Moore as Sarah [Griswold]
- Edward Everett Horton as [Harry] Fisher
- Nydia Westman as Dinah
- Henry Kolker as Hatfield
- Allen Vincent as Geoffrey Halliburton
