= Painted People =

1924 film

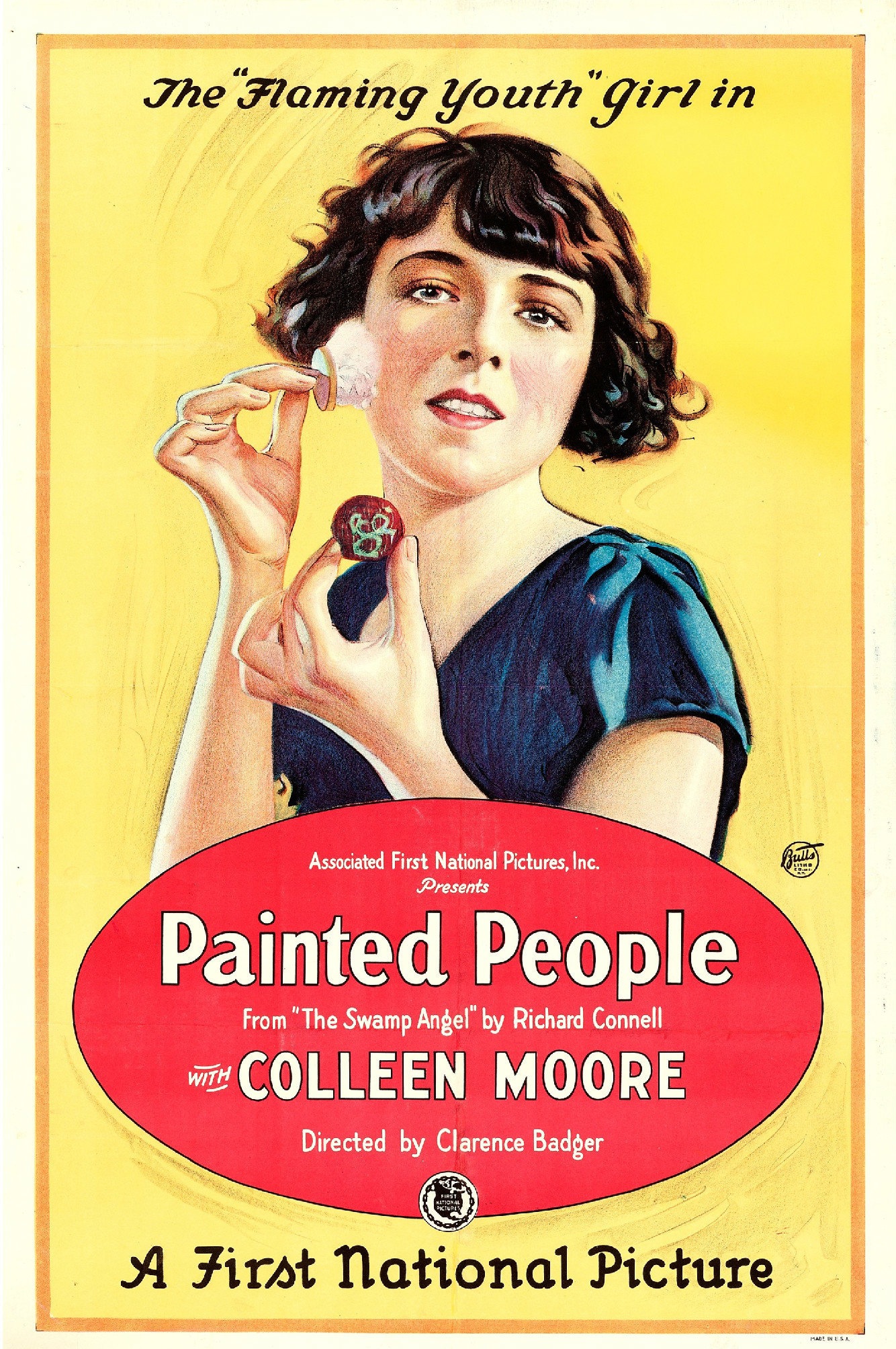
- Theatrical poster
- Directed by: Clarence G. Badger
- Written by: Edward J. Montagne
- Based on: "The Swamp" by Richard Connell
- Produced by: Associated First National
- Starring: Colleen Moore
- Cinematography: Rudolph Bergquist
- Edited by: George McQuire
- Distributed by: Associated First National
- Release date: January 28, 1924
- Running time: 7 reels
- Country: United States
- Language: Silent (English intertitles)

Painted People is a 1924 American silent comedy-drama film directed by Clarence G. Badger and starring Colleen Moore. It was produced and distributed by Associated First National Pictures.

== Plot ==
As described in a review of the film in a film magazine, Ellie Byrne (Moore) and Don Lane (Lyon), chums, living in the poor section of a factory town, go away to make their fortunes. Ellie wishes to become a lady so that she can marry Preston Dutton (Striker), a society chap, and Don becoming infatuated with Stephanie Parrish (Merriam), daughter of a wealthy man. Ellie becomes a leading actress and Don the author of her first play. Ellie refuses Dutton’s suit when she learns he is after her money, and Stephanie returns Don’s engagement ring. Ellie and Don go back to the factory town disillusioned. They realize that they love each other and in reality had not bettered themselves for someone else but for each other.

== Cast ==
- Colleen Moore as Ellie Byrne
- Ben Lyon as Don Lane
- Charlotte Merriam as Stephanie Parrish
- Joseph Striker as Preston Dutton
- Charles Murray as Tom Byrne
- Russell Simpson as Fred Lane
- Mary Alden as Mrs. Byrne
- Mary Carr as Mrs. Lane
- Sam De Grasse as Henry Parrish
- June Elvidge as Mrs. Dutton
- Anna Q. Nilsson as Leslie Carter
- Bull Montana as Ed Decker

== Preservation ==
With no copies of Painted People located in any film archives or collections, it is a lost film.
