= Lilac Time (film) =

1928 film

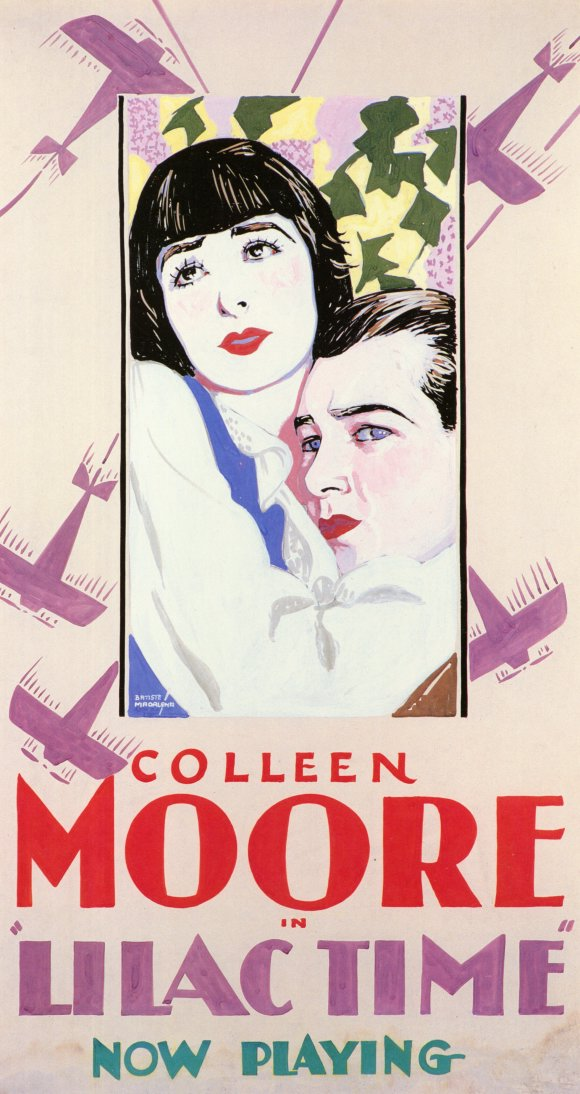
- Theatrical release poster
- Directed by: George Fitzmaurice; Frank Lloyd (uncredited)
- Written by: Carey Wilson; George Marion Jr. (intertitles); Willis Goldbeck (adaptation); Adela Rogers St. Johns (adaptation)
- Based on: play by Jane Murfin and Jane Cowl
- Produced by: John McCormick
- Starring: Colleen Moore; Gary Cooper
- Cinematography: Sidney Hickox
- Edited by: Alexander Hall
- Music by: Cecil Copping; Nathaniel Shilkret
- Production company: First National Pictures
- Distributed by: Warner Bros. Pictures
- Release dates: August 3, 1928 (New York City, premiere); October 18, 1928 (US)
- Running time: 110 minutes
- Country: United States
- Languages: Sound (Synchronized); English Intertitles; Vitaphone
- Box office: $1.675 million (U.S. and Canada rentals)

Lilac Time is a 1928 American synchronized sound romantic war film directed by George Fitzmaurice and starring Colleen Moore and Gary Cooper. While the film has no audible dialog, it was released with a synchronized musical score with sound effects using the short-lived Firnatone process. After First National Pictures was taken over by Warner Bros. Pictures, the soundtrack was transferred to sound-on-disc Vitaphone discs and re-released in that format. The film is about young American aviators fighting for Britain during World War I who are billeted in a field next to a farmhouse in France. The daughter who lives on the farm meets one of the new aviators who is attracted to her. As the flyers head off on a mission, the young aviator promises to return to her.

Lilac Time was produced by John McCormick (Moore's husband), and distributed by First National Pictures. The silent film "adaptation" by Willis Goldbeck is based on a 1917 Broadway play written by Jane Murfin and actress Jane Cowl. Though some sources erroneously cite the play as having been based on a novel by Guy Fowler, the reverse is true: Fowler novelized the Goldbeck adaptation for the popular line of Grosset & Dunlap Photoplay Editions, also drawing upon text and dialogue of the play itself. Lilac Time offers several phases, beginning with slapstick comedy elements, becoming an intense romantic film, then segueing into a spectacular aerial showdown. This was followed by a duel in the sky between Cooper's character and the "Red Ace" before returning to romantic complications.

== Plot ==
Lilac Time (1928)

Jeannine Berthelot is a wistful and spirited French village girl who, along with her mother Madame Berthelot, runs a modest farm near the front. The property has been requisitioned as quarters for seven young aviators of the Royal Flying Corps, whom Jeannine lovingly mothers and teases. Among these is the impish "Kid" and a helpful mechanic's assistant, overseen by gruff Mike the Mechanic.

Into this lively household arrives Captain Philip Blythe, a dashing new replacement for a recently lost flyer. On his first landing, Philip nearly crashes into Jeannine, who is dressed in mechanic's overalls and cap, her face smudged with grease. Mistaking her for a mischievous boy, he scolds and cuffs her. Outraged and embarrassed, Jeannine vows revenge, but her feelings soon soften. Secretly, she begins praying in the lilac garden to a statue of Joan of Arc, begging the saint to make the brave young pilot love her.

One afternoon, while hiding in the cockpit of Philip's plane, Jeannine inadvertently causes the throttle to open. The plane surges across the field, lifts off, and crashes into trees. Though badly shaken, Jeannine is miraculously unhurt. Philip rescues her from the wreckage, and in the aftermath, he realizes how deeply he cares for her.

Their tender moment is interrupted by the sudden arrival of General Blythe, Philip's stern father, and Lady Iris Rankin, the elegant socialite to whom Philip is betrothed. Though Philip shows little affection toward his fiancée, Jeannine, witnessing their farewell kiss, is crushed with heartbreak.

As war intensifies, orders come for a major Allied offensive. The flyers, including Captain Russell, are tasked with clearing enemy aircraft from the skies at dawn. The night before battle, Philip visits Jeannine in the lilac garden. “I shall never smell the lilac blossom again without thinking of you,” he tells her. “You will come back!” she pleads. “I will wait for you here.”

At daybreak, the planes depart. As the village is evacuated by French troops, Jeannine is ordered to leave with the elderly and children. She slips away and returns to the lilac garden to wait.

Suddenly, from the clouds, two planes emerge in deadly combat—one German, one British. Both aircraft plummet to earth. One crashes near Jeannine. Rushing to the wreckage, she finds Philip unconscious but alive. He is taken away in an ambulance, seemingly at death's door.

Jeannine begins a desperate search for him through overcrowded field hospitals. When at last she finds him, General Blythe confronts her. Wishing to keep his wounded son away from a peasant girl, he falsely informs Jeannine that Philip is dead.

Shattered, Jeannine wanders out of the hospital in a daze. With the last of her coins, she buys a bouquet of lilacs and sends it to the man she believes she has lost forever, asking only that the flowers be laid next to his cheek.

The scent of the lilacs reaches Philip, still alive and recovering. Awakening, he realizes Jeannine must be near. From his hospital window, he calls her name. She rushes up the stairs and finds him—bandaged, weak, but alive. Sobbing with relief, Jeannine falls into his arms. Their love, forged in the shadow of war, has survived.

== Cast ==
- Colleen Moore as Jeannine Berthelot
- Gary Cooper as Captain Philip Blythe
- Burr McIntosh as General Blyth
- George Cooper as Mechanic's helper
- Cleve Moore as Captain Russell
- Kathryn McGuire as Lady Iris Rankin
- Eugenie Besserer as Madame Berthelot
- Émile Chautard as The Mayor
- Jack Stone as The Kid
- Edward Dillon as Mike the Mechanic
- Dick Grace as Aviator
- Stuart Knox as Aviator
- Harlan Hilton as Aviator
- Richard Jarvis as Aviator
- Jack Ponder as Aviator
- Dan Dowling as Aviator
- Eddie Clayton as The Enemy Ace
- Arthur Lake as The Unlucky One
- Philo McCullough as German Officer
- Nelson McDowell as French Drummer

== Music ==
The theme song of the film was entitled "Jeannine, I Dream of Lilac Time" and was composed by Nathaniel Shilkret with lyrics by L. Wolfe Gilbert.

== Preservation ==
The entire soundtrack survives on Vitaphone discs at the BFI.

== Production ==
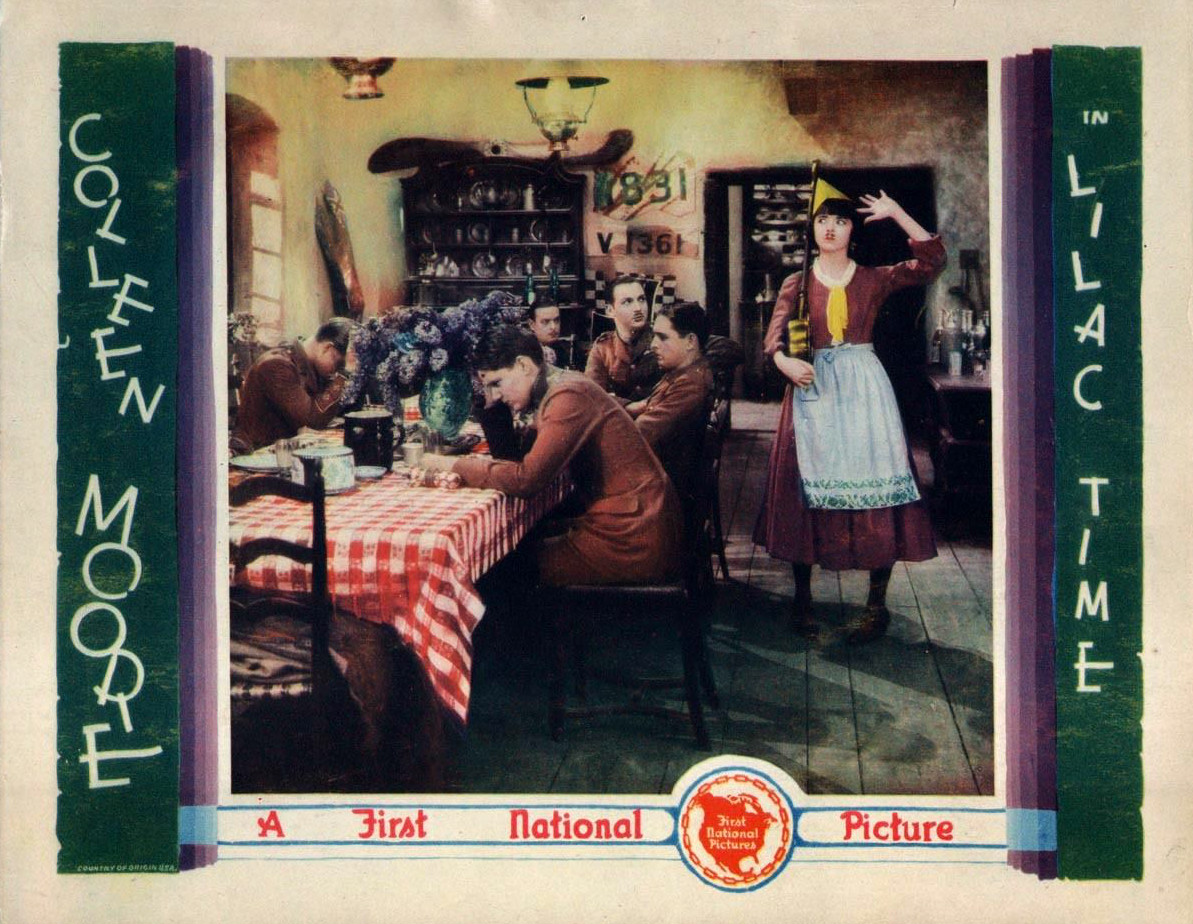
Lobby card

Lilac Time was shot on sets at First National's Burbank studio and on location in El Toro, California, where a working airstrip, full-sized French village and farm serving as a base for a fictional Royal Flying Corps squadron, were built. For some scenes, the deserted village in Allaire, New Jersey were used for backdrops. In addition a portable machine shop serviced the seven Waco 10 biplanes purchased and leased by aerial coordinator Dick Grace for the production.

The crash scenes in Lilac Time turned out to be particularly difficult and hazardous. One scene called for Grace to crash and flip upside down in an aircraft. The second crash scene involved a crash-landing where the aircraft pirouetted on its nose and nearly hitting Opal Boswell, Moore's double, who scampered out of the way at the last moment. The third crash pitted a Waco 10 against a stand of eucalyptus trees that tore off the wings of the taxiing aircraft.

Looking for realism, many extras cast as soldiers in the film had been actual World War I soldiers, in the ranks they portrayed. The chief stunt pilot, Dick Grace, had only finished doing stunt work on the Paramount film Wings (1927) nearly two months earlier. Grace sustained a severe neck injury in a stunt crash while making Wings but recovered in time for Lilac Time.

Among those in the cast were Colleen Moore's brother Cleve (billed as "Cleve Moore") and her cousin, Jack Stone. Eugenie Besserer had played "Mrs. Goode," a mother figure in Colleen's earlier film Little Orphant Annie, the first film to bring Colleen a measure of fame.

== Reception ==
Lilac Time had its opening in Los Angeles at the Carthay Circle Theatre where, in the lobby, among other promotional materials on display, was the wrecked fuselage of one of the aircraft that had been destroyed during the filming. The film cost one million dollars to produce, an amount equal to Moore's previous two films. The studio recouped the cost of the film within months. By the end of 1928, the film had out-performed Moore's earlier star vehicle Flaming Youth (1923). (Note: A restored 35mm print of Lilac Time was screened at the Museum of Modern Art in New York City in September 2014.)

Lilac Time was released with a Vitaphone score and music effects, featuring the song "Jeannine, I Dream of Lilac Time," but there was no spoken dialogue. The film premiered in New York City on August 3, 1928, and was released in the United States on October 18, 1928.

Aviation film historian James H. Farmer in Celluloid Wings: The Impact of Movies on Aviation (1984), described Lilac Time, as "Overly sentimental; somewhat redeemed by the film's original aerial sequences, including several crashes; all of which were shot specifically for the production."

Aviation film historian Stephen Pendo, inAviation in the Cinema (1985) had similar views about Lilac Time, noting, "of all the aviation films of the period, 'Lilac Time' stands out as one of the most sentimental ..." The same comment about the sentimentality of Lilac Time is echoed by aviation film historian Michael Paris in From the Wright Brothers to Top Gun: Aviation, Nationalism, and Popular Cinema, (1995).

== See also ==
- List of early sound feature films (1926–1929)
- List of early Warner Bros. sound and talking features
