= Nifty Numbers =

1928 film

Nifty Numbers is a 1928 2-reel short film subject from Al Christie Studios. It is part a series called Confessions of a Chorus Girl. Nifty Numbers is the fourth installment in this series. The 5th and 6th installments were called Footlight Fanny(1929) and Tight Places(1929) respectively.

Prints of the film are privately held.

== Cast ==
- Frances Lee - Doris
- Billy Engle - Mr. Knit
- Jimmie Hertz - partner to Mr. Knit
- Eddie Barry - J.R. Stern

uncredited

- Aileen Carlyle
- Cliff Lancaster
- Margaret Lee
- Georgia O'Dell
