= Alfred E. Green =

American film director

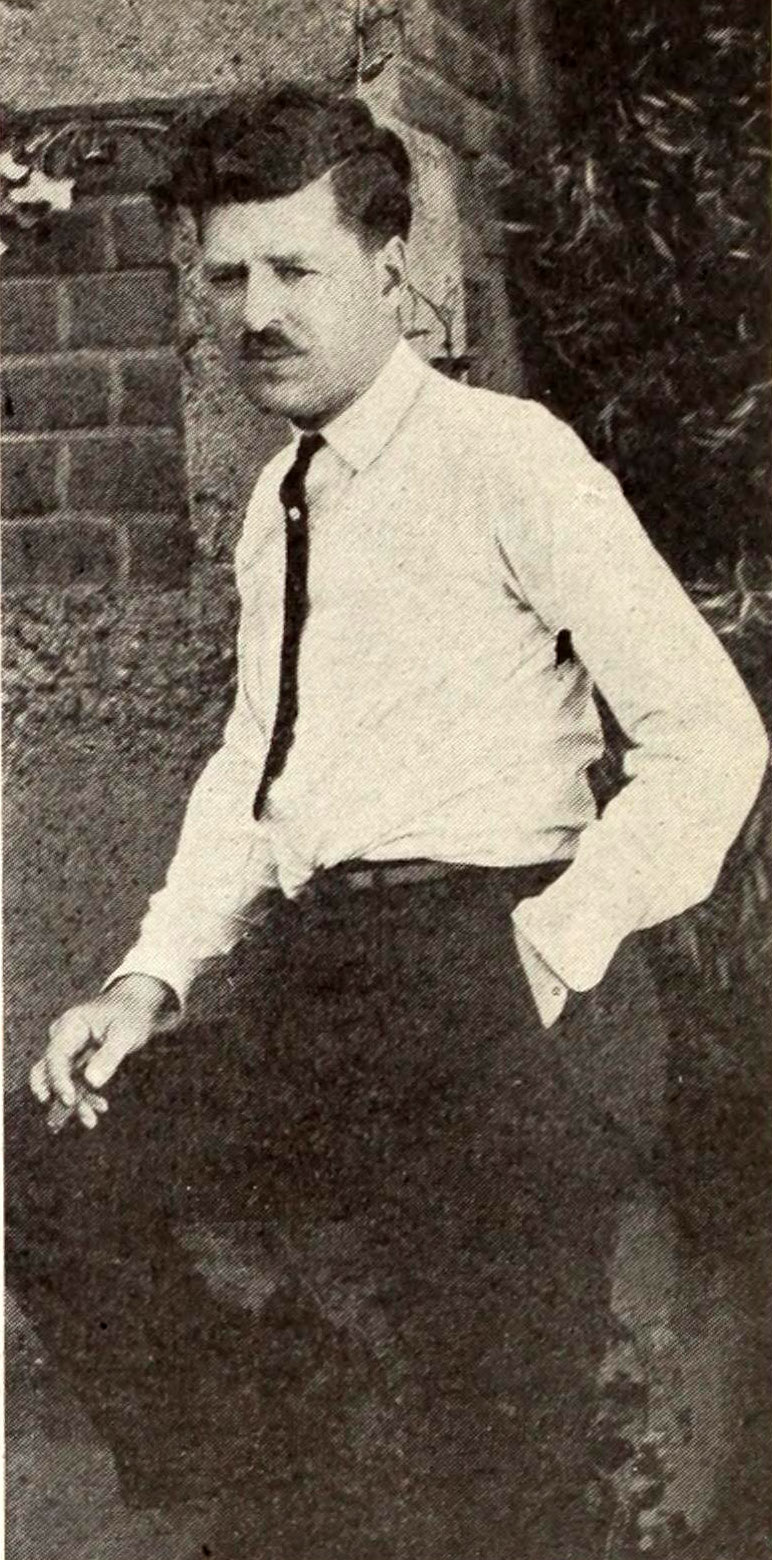
- Green in 1921
- Born: Alfred Edward Green; July 11, 1889; Perris, California
- Died: September 4, 1960 (aged 71); Hollywood, California
- Resting place: Forest Lawn Memorial Park (Glendale)
- Occupation: Film director
- Years active: 1916–1954
- Spouse: Vivian Reed
- Children: Douglas Green; Hilton A. Green; Marshall Green

Alfred Edward Green (July 11, 1889 – September 4, 1960) was an American film director. Green entered film in 1912 as an actor for the Selig Polyscope Company. He became an assistant to director Colin Campbell.

== Biography ==
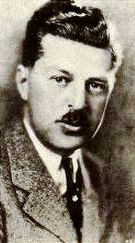
Alfred E. Green in 1922

Green was born on July 11, 1889, in Perris, California. Green was one of the early pioneers of the Southern California film industry, starting with directing two-reel comedies before transitioning to feature films in 1917.

In a durable career lasting until the 1950s, Green directed major stars such as Mary Pickford, Wallace Reid, Barbara Stanwyck, William Powell, and Colleen Moore. In 1926's Ella Cinders, he also played a director. In 1935, Green directed Dangerous, starring Bette Davis, who won Best Actress for her performance. Much later came Green's hit success The Jolson Story (1946) and the affectionate western Four Faces West (1948), known outside the US by the more expressive title They Passed This Way. Then followed another string of B movies as well as two more biographical films, The Jackie Robinson Story (1950) and The Eddie Cantor Story (1953). After retiring from motion pictures, he directed several TV episodes.

Green was married to silent film actress Vivian Reed. They had three children, Douglas Green, Hilton A. Green, and Marshall Green, all of whom worked as assistant directors.

== Death ==
Green died on September 4, 1960, in Hollywood, California.

== Legacy ==
Green has a star on the Hollywood Walk of Fame.

== Filmography ==
Year	Film	Role	Notes
1916	The Temptation of Adam	Director	
1916	The Crisis	Director	
1917	Little Lost Sister	Director	
1917	The Princess of Patches	Director	
1917	The Lad and the Lion	Director	
1919	The Unpardonable Sin	Director	
1919	The Web of Chance	Director	
1920	Blind Youth	Director	
1920	Silk Husbands and Calico Wives	Director	
1920	A Double-Dyed Deceiver	Director	
1920	The Man Who Had Everything	Director	
1920	Just Out of College	Director	
1921	Little Lord Fauntleroy	Director	
1921	Through the Back Door	Director	
1922	The Ghost Breaker	Director	
1922	Darlin'	Director	
1922	The Bachelor Daddy	Director	
1922	Our Leading Citizen	Director	
1922	The Man Who Saw Tomorrow	Director	
1922	Back Home and Broke	Director	
1923	Woman-Proof	Director	
1923	The Ne'er-Do-Well	Director	
1924	Pied Piper Malone	Director	
1924	Inez from Hollywood	Director	
1924	In Hollywood With Potash and Perlmutter	Director	
1925	Sally	Director	
1925	The Talker	Director	
1925	The Man Who Found Himself	Director	
1926	The Girl from Montmartre	Director	
1926	Irene	Director	
1926	Ella Cinders	Director	
1926	It Must Be Love	Director	
1926	Ladies at Play	Director	
1927	The Auctioneer	Director	
1927	Is Zat So?	Director	
1927	Two Girls Wanted	Director	
1927	Come to My House	Director	
1928	Honor Bound	Director	
1929	Making the Grade	Director	
1929	Disraeli	Director	
1930	The Green Goddess	Director	
1930	The Man From Blankley's	Director	
1930	Sweet Kitty Bellairs	Director	
1930	Old English	Director	
1931	Men of the Sky	Director	
1931	Smart Money	Director	
1931	The Road to Singapore	Director	
1932	Union Depot	Director	
1932	It's Tough to Be Famous	Director	
1932	The Rich Are Always With Us	Director	
1932	The Dark Horse	Director	
1932	Silver Dollar	Director	
1933	Parachute Jumper	Director	
1933	Baby Face	Director	
1933	Central Airport	Director	
1933	The Narrow Corner	Director	
1933	I Loved a Woman	Director	
1933	Grand Slam	Director	
1934	Dark Hazard	Director	
1934	As the Earth Turns	Director	
1934	The Merry Frinks	Director	
1934	Side Streets	Director	
1934	Housewife	Director	
1934	A Lost Lady	Director	
1934	Gentlemen Are Born	Director	
1935	Sweet Music	Director	
1935	The Girl From 10th Avenue	Director	
1935	Here's to Romance	Director	
1935	The Goose and the Gander	Director	
1935	Dangerous	Director	
1936	Colleen	Director	
1936	The Golden Arrow	Director	
1936	They Met in a Taxi	Director	
1936	Two in a Crowd	Director	
1936	More Than a Secretary	Director	
1937	The League of Frightened Men	Director	
1937	Thoroughbreds Don't Cry	Director	
1937	Let's Get Married	Director	
1937	Mr. Dodd Takes the Air	Director	
1938	Ride a Crooked Mile	Director	
1938	The Duke of West Point	Director	
1939	King of the Turf	Director	
1939	The Gracie Allen Murder Case	Director	
1939	20,000 Men a Year	Director	
1940	Flowing Gold	Director	
1940	South of Pago Pago	Director	
1940	East of the River	Director	
1940	Shooting High	Director	
1941	Badlands of Dakota	Director	
1941	Female Correspondent	Director	
1942	Meet the Stewarts	Director	
1942	The Mayor of 44th Street	Director	
1943	Appointment in Berlin	Director	
1943	There's Something About a Soldier	Director	
1944	Mr. Winkle Goes to War	Director	
1944	Strange Affair	Director	
1945	A Thousand and One Nights	Director	
1946	Tars and Spars	Director	
1946	The Jolson Story	Director	
1947	The Fabulous Dorseys	Director	
1947	Copacabana	Director	
1948	Four Faces West	Director	
1948	The Girl from Manhattan	Director	
1949	Cover-Up	Director	
1950	Sierra	Director	
1950	The Jackie Robinson Story	Director	
1951	Two Gals and a Guy	Director	
1952	Invasion USA	Director	
1953	Paris Model	Director	
1953	The Eddie Cantor Story	Director	
1954	Top Banana	Director	
