= A Roman Scandal (film) =

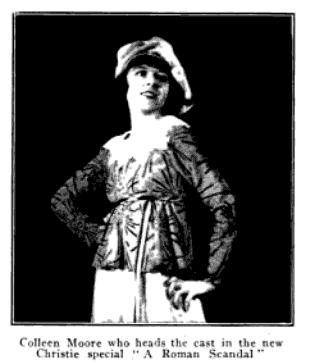
- A magazine ad featuring Colleen Moore as a new actress for Christie Film Co. starring in the film A Roman Scandal.
- Directed by: Al Christie
- Written by: Frank Roland Conklin (story); Scott Darling (scenario)
- Starring: Colleen Moore; Earle Rodney; Eddie Barry
- Distributed by: Christie Film Company
- Release date: November 30, 1919
- Running time: 24 minutes
- Country: United States
- Language: Silent (English intertitles)

A Roman Scandal is a 1919 American short silent comedy film starring Colleen Moore, and directed by Al Christie. A print of A Roman Scandal exists.

== Plot ==
Mary is stage struck and will not marry until she makes it in show business. Her fiance is distraught that they might never marry. The actors of the local stage company go on strike, leaving management with nobody to fill all the roles. Mary volunteers herself and her fiance, and in the confusion of the production, chaos follows. In the end, Mary abandons her dreams for domestic bliss.

== Cast ==
- Colleen Moore as Mary
- Earle Rodney as Jack
- Eddie Barry
- Billy Bletcher
- Helen Darling
- Jack Henderson
- Gino Corrado (credited as Eugene Corey)

== Background ==
Moore went to work with Al Christie to develop her comedy skills. Prior to her work with Christie, she was strictly a dramatic actress. In her autobiography Silent Star, she said she had read a quote that the greatest dramatic actresses had gotten their starts in comedy.

The film, a two-reel short, played with several other longer features at the various other venues where it was exhibited, such as with Anne of Green Gables, a Mary Miles Minter film, and with Cosmo Hamilton's The Miracle of Love at the Rivoli Rialto Theater in New York.

== Bibliography ==
- Jeff Codori (2012), Colleen Moore; A Biography of the Silent Film Star, McFarland Publishing,(Print ISBN 978-0-7864-4969-9, EBook ISBN 978-0-7864-8899-5).
