= Through the Dark (1924 film) =

1924 film

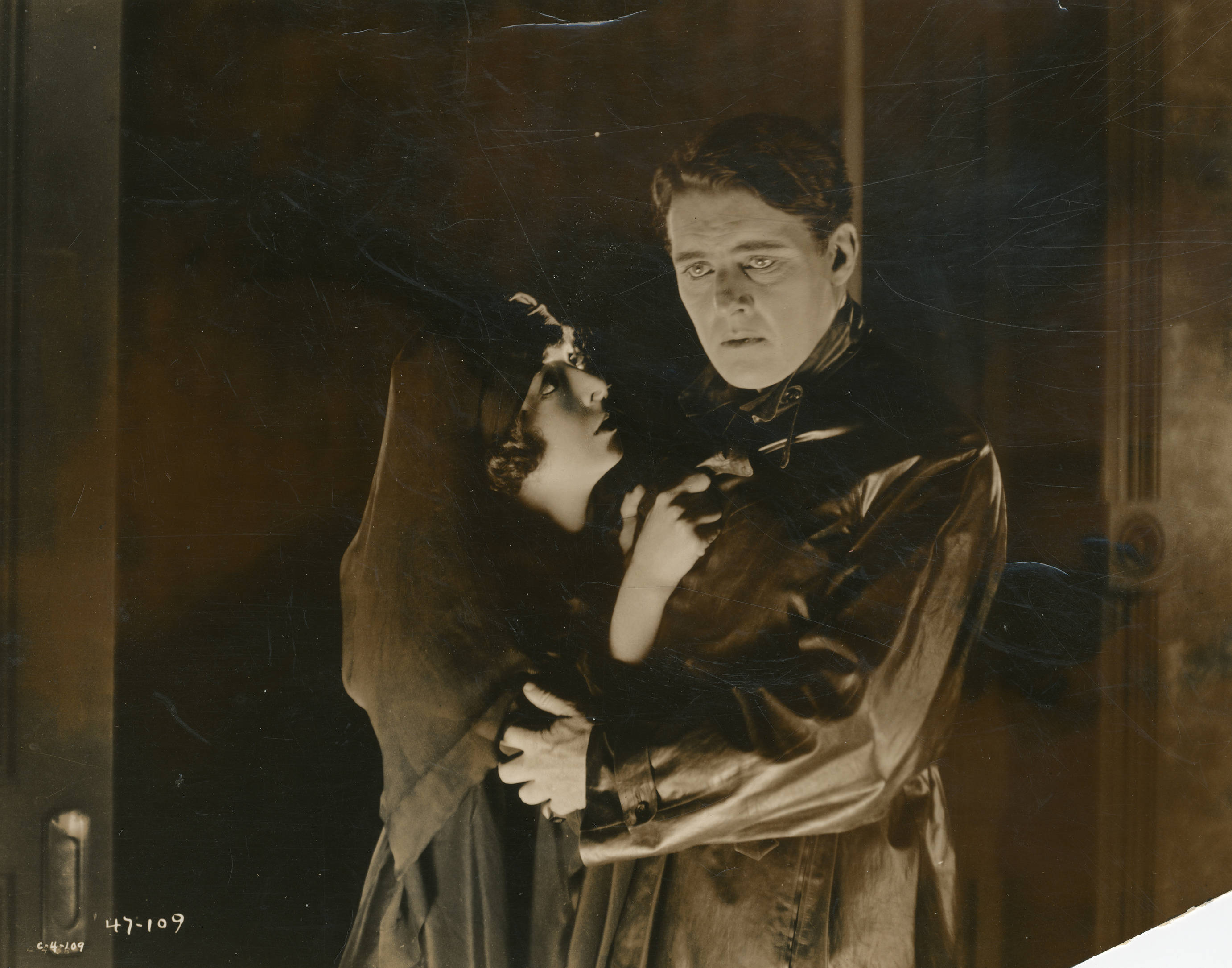
- Still with Colleen Moore and Forrest Stanley
- Directed by: George W. Hill
- Written by: Frances Marion (scenario)
- Based on: "The Daughter of Mother McGinn" by Jack Boyle
- Starring: Forrest Stanley; Colleen Moore
- Cinematography: L. William O'Connell; Allen Siegler
- Production company: Cosmopolitan Productions
- Distributed by: Goldwyn Pictures
- Release date: January 6, 1924
- Running time: 80 mins.
- Country: United States
- Language: Silent (English intertitles)

Through the Dark is a 1924 American silent mystery crime drama film directed by George W. Hill, and starring Colleen Moore and Forrest Stanley as the popular jewel thief and sometimes detective character Boston Blackie. The film's scenario, written by Frances Marion, is based on the short story "The Daughter of Mother McGinn" by Jack Boyle, which appeared in serial form in Cosmopolitan. The film was produced by William Randolph Hearst's Cosmopolitan Productions and distributed through Goldwyn Pictures.

== Plot ==
As described in a film magazine review, during a rebellion of prisoners at the San Quentin State Prison, Boston Blackie makes a lightning escape aided by Mary McGinn while chased prison guards. Mary is a school girl, unaware that her brothers are crooks. She is expelled from school. Blackie rejoins his gang and takes refuge in Mother McGinn's house, where he again meets Mary. She devotes herself to making Blackie go straight and wins her point.

== Cast ==
- Colleen Moore as Mary McGinn
- Forrest Stanley as Boston Blackie
- Margaret Seddon as Mother McGinn
- Hobart Bosworth as Warden
- George Cooper as Travel
- Eddie Phillips as The 'Glad Rag' Kid (credited as Edward Phillips)
- Wade Boteler as Detective O'Leary
- Tom Bates as Sandy
- Carmelita Geraghty as Ethel Grayson
- Maxine Elliott Hicks

== Censorship ==
The film was banned by the British Board of Film Censors upon its release for its depiction of unspecified "taboo" subject matter.

== Preservation ==
An incomplete print of Through the Dark missing reels 7 and 8 (of 8) is preserved at the Library of Congress.
