= Her Bridal Nightmare =

1920 film

Her Bridal Night-Mare
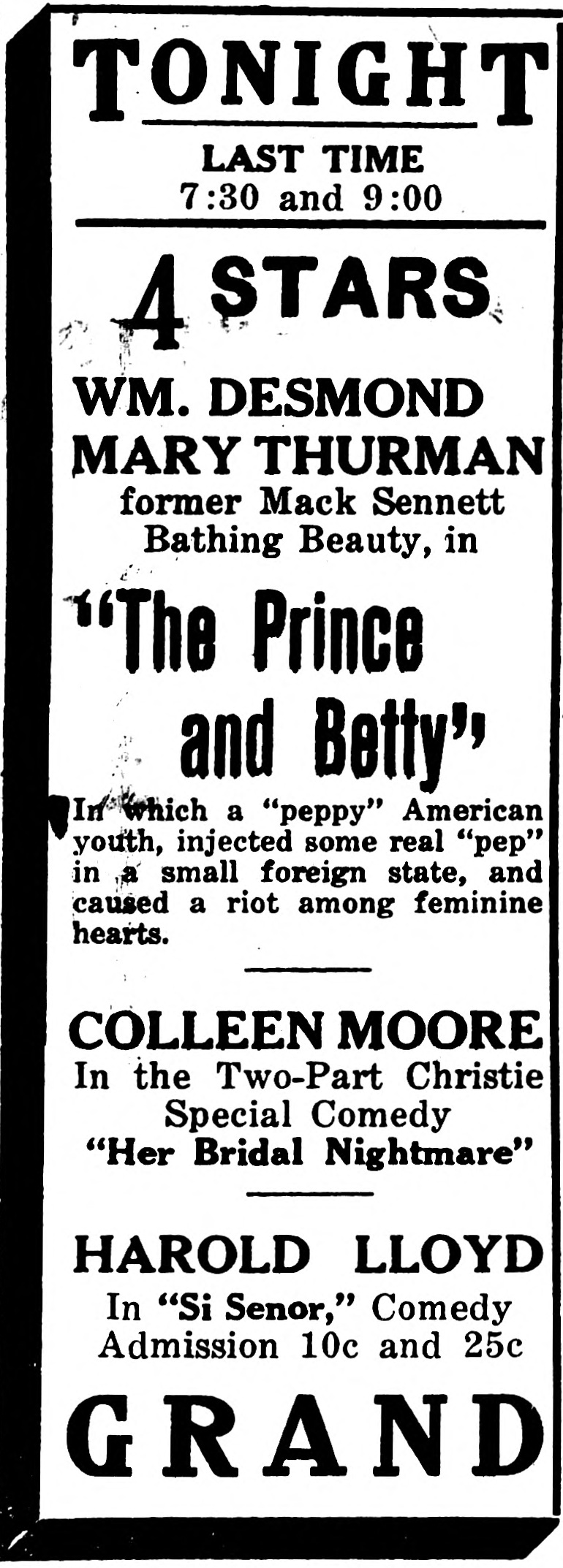
- Contemporary newspaper advertisement for three films including Her Bridal Nightmare
- Directed by: Al Christie
- Written by: Ora Carew
- Produced by: Christie Film Company
- Starring: Colleen Moore; Eddie Barry; Gino Corrado; Helen Darling
- Release date: February 1920
- Country: United States
- Language: Silent (English intertitles)

Her Bridal Nightmare

Her Bridal Night-Mare is a 1920 American silent comedy film from the Christie Film Company. It was one of Colleen Moore's first comedy films. The film still exists and has been released on DVD.

== Story ==
Mary, a bride-to-be, has a troublesome wedding day. A jealous suitor steals the groom's tuxedo and hires a pickpocket to strike the wedding and reception. The pickpocket, a master of disguise but a dope as well, wears the tuxedo to the reception and steals all the gifts. The groom is arrested in his skivvies and thrown in jail. The suitor tells Mary that the groom has left her for another woman. Mary decides to commit suicide, but is unsuccessful on her own. She runs into the pickpocket and pays him to kill her when she least suspects it. In the meantime, the groom has managed to be released from jail and sent back by the suitor. When Mary learns her groom has not been unfaithful, she decides she wants to live, but as her hired killer is in disguise, she must wear a disguise herself (a man's suit). The pickpocket's girlfriend has found religion and converts the pickpocket, who returns to the reception with his booty, confesses, and saves the day.

== Cast ==
- Eddie Barry as unnamed
- Gino Corrado as unnamed
- Helen Darling as unnamed
- Colleen Moore as Mary
- Earle Rodney as Jack
