= Smiling Irish Eyes =

1929 film directed by William A. Seiter

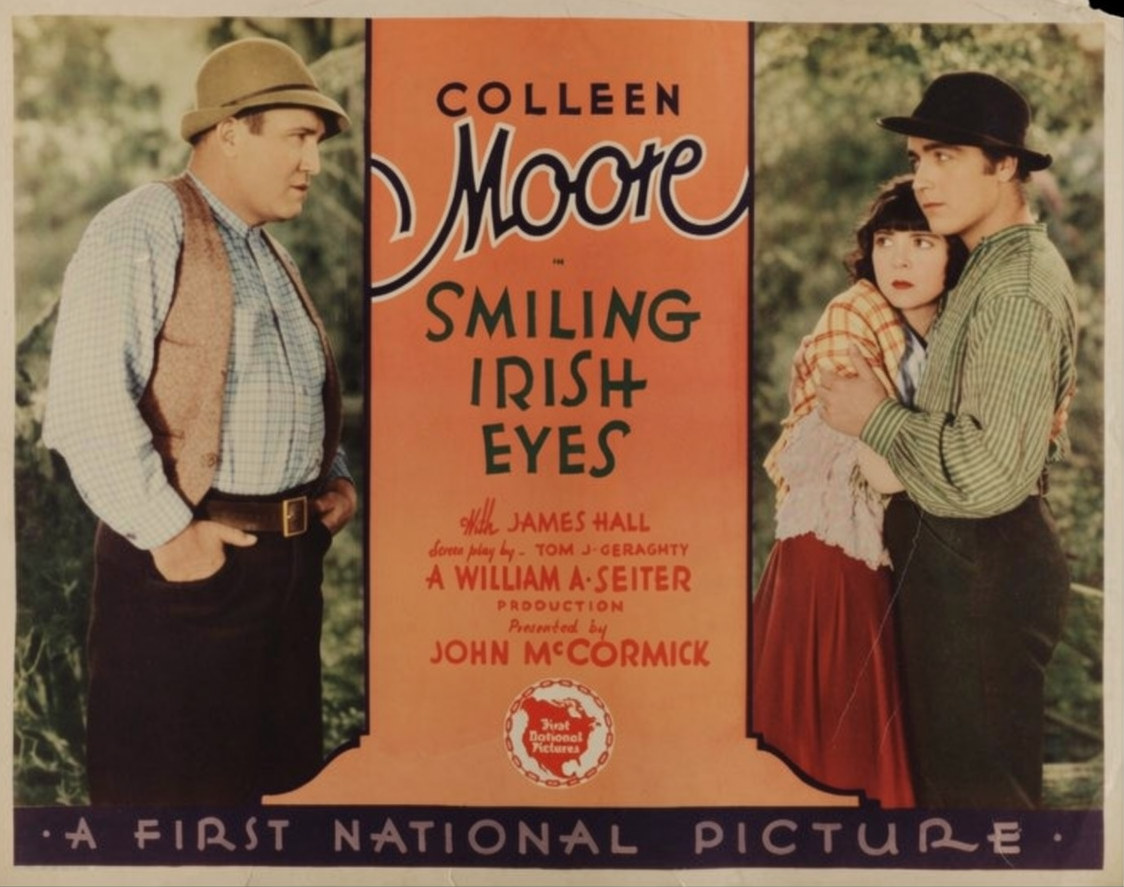
- Lobby Card
- Directed by: William A. Seiter
- Written by: Thomas J. Geraghty (story, screenplay, titles)
- Produced by: John McCormick
- Starring: Colleen Moore; James Hall; Robert Homans; Claude Gillingwater
- Cinematography: Henry Freulich; Sidney Hickox
- Edited by: Alexander Hall
- Music by: Louis Silvers
- Production companies: First National Pictures; The Vitaphone Corp.
- Distributed by: Warner Bros. Pictures, Inc.
- Release dates: July 28, 1929 (sound version); September 22, 1929 (silent version)
- Running time: 90 minutes
- Country: United States
- Language: English

Smiling Irish Eyes is a 1929 American sound (All-Talking) pre-Code Vitaphone musical film with Technicolor sequences directed by William A. Seiter. The film is now considered a lost film. However, the Vitaphone audio discs still exist.

== Plot ==
Rory O'More, a young Irish fiddler, is deeply in love with Kathleen O'Connor, for whom he has been composing music. During a quiet moment together as Rory plays his newest ballad, "Smiling Irish Eyes", they are interrupted by Black Barney O’Toole, Rory's hot-tempered foreman at the peat bogs. Furious that Rory is idling, Barney smashes his fiddle and storms off with Kathleen's beloved pet pig, Aloysius, intending to enter it in the County Fair.

Seeking justice, Rory and Kathleen approach the estate's landlord, Sir Timothy Tyrone, who is entertaining American guests. Rory is asked to play, and his performance is so moving that one guest encourages him to pursue a musical career in America. Enthralled by the idea, Rory begins to dream of a better life.

At the County Fair, chaos ensues when Kathleen accidentally breaks what she believes is a valuable vase and flees in panic. Meanwhile, the greased pig, Aloysius, escapes and races through the fairgrounds. Kathleen catches him—unaware of the contest—and wins the prize: twenty pounds. She gives the money to Rory to finance his trip to America.

In New York, Rory struggles, living in a rundown boarding house. Though he writes daily to Kathleen, he never sends the letters, determined to wait until he has good news to share. Two chorus girls—Frankie West and Goldie Devore—hear him playing "Smiling Irish Eyes" through the thin walls and urge their producer to give him a shot. Rory is soon hired to perform in a theatrical revue.

Back in Ireland, Kathleen grows heartbroken from Rory's silence. Seeing her despair, Granny O’More pleads with Sir Timothy to help. Sir Timothy agrees, and Kathleen sets sail for New York, determined to bring Rory home. She locates the boarding house from his lone postcard, but he's no longer living there. The landlady directs her to the theater.

Kathleen arrives backstage just in time to see Rory performing "Smiling Irish Eyes". But when she sees another girl kiss him, she believes he's been unfaithful. Crushed, she leaves a note for him and boards the next ship back to Ireland.

On her return, Kathleen is stunned to find her two uncles and Granny O’More preparing for a journey—Rory has sent them five hundred pounds to bring them all to America. She's also handed the stack of unsent letters Rory wrote to her. Just then, Rory arrives in person. Kathleen confronts him about the woman at the theater, but Rory explains everything, including the kiss and the misunderstanding.

Reassured of his love, Kathleen forgives him. With hearts mended, Rory, Kathleen, Granny, and the family all depart for a new life in America.

== Cast ==
- Colleen Moore as Kathleen O'Connor
- James Hall as Rory O'More
- Robert Homans as Shamus O'Connor
- Claude Gillingwater as Michael O'Connor
- Tom O'Brien as Barney "Black Barney"
- Robert Emmett O'Connor as Sir Timothy
- Aggie Herring as Granny O'More
- Betty Francisco as Frankie West
- Julanne Johnston as Goldie Devore
- Edward Earle as Ralph Prescott
- Fred Kelsey as County Fair Manager
- Barney Gilmore as County Fair Manager's Assistant
- Charles McHugh as County Fair Manager's Assistant
- Madam Bosocki as Fortune Teller
- George 'Gabby' Hayes as Taxi Driver
- Anne Schaefer as Landlady
- John Beck as Sir Timothy's Butler
- Oscar Apfel as Max North
- Otto Lederer as Izzy Levi
- William H. Strauss as Moe Levi
- David Thursby as "Scotch" Barker
- Dan Crimmins as The Trouble Maker

== Background ==
Smiling Irish Eyes was Colleen Moore's first musical role, and only her first sound film. Produced by her husband at the time, John McCormick (1893–1961), the film featured Moore as Kathleen O'Connor, an Irish woman who follows her musician sweetheart Rory O'More (James Hall) to New York City.

This film is similar to an earlier film Moore made for Samuel Goldwyn, Come On Over (1922), directed by Rupert Hughes. As in Smiling Irish Eyes, Colleen played an Irish girl whose betrothed crosses the ocean to start a new life in America before sending for her. In both films, the boyfriends do not send for her right away, in both she travels to America only to find the boyfriend seemingly besotted by another girl. In both, cases this is a misunderstanding. In Come On Over, Colleen's character reluctantly remains in America where she learns that her boyfriend is actually helping the father of the "other woman" quit drinking. In Smiling Irish Eyes, Colleen's character returns to Ireland, followed by the boyfriend, who convinces her back in Ireland that it was a misunderstanding. They marry and return to America. Following this film, Moore made another film directed by Seiter, Footlights and Fools (1929). This latter film also had Technicolor sequences, and is now considered a lost film, although the Vitaphone discs survive.

== Soundtrack ==
- "Smiling Irish Eyes" (Theme Song)

by Herman Ruby and Ray Perkins
Sung by Colleen Moore and James Hall

- "A Wee Bit o' Love"

by Herman Ruby and Norman Spencer
Sung by Colleen Moore

- "Then I Can Ride Home With You"

by Herman Ruby and Norman Spencer
Sung by Colleen Moore

- "In Our Cottage of Love"

by Herman Ruby and Norman Spencer
Sung by Colleen Moore and James Hall

- "Old Killarney Fair"

by Herman Ruby and Norman Spencer
Sung by Colleen Moore

- "Darlin' My Darlin'"

by Herman Ruby and Norman Spencer
Sung by James Hall

- "Grandma O'Moore"

by Herman Ruby and Norman Spencer
Sung by Colleen Moore

== See also ==
- List of lost films
- List of early color feature films
- List of early sound feature films (1926–1929)
