= Colleen Moore =

American actress (1899–1988)

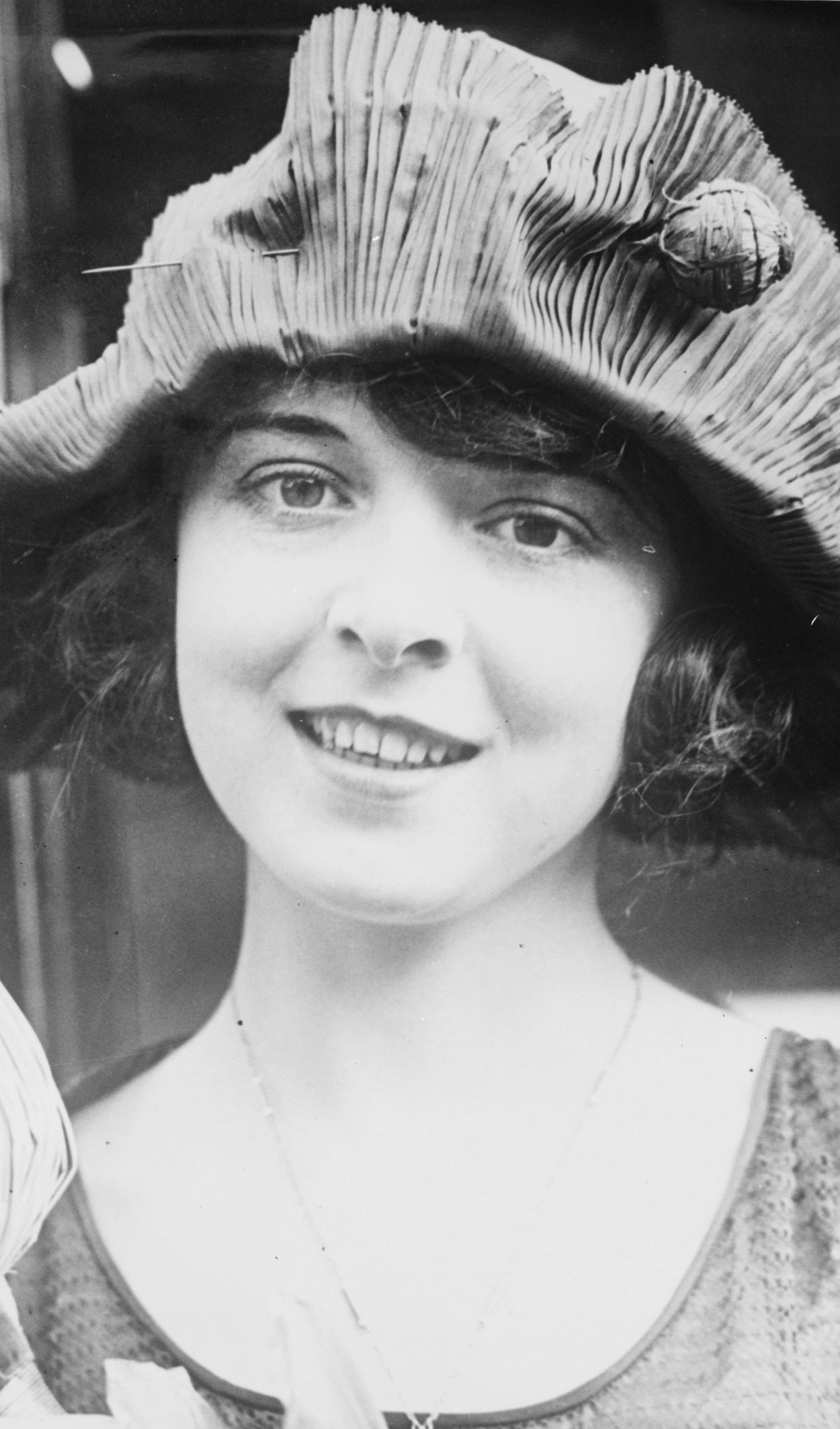
- Moore in 1920
- Born: Kathleen Morrison; August 19, 1899; Port Huron, Michigan, U.S.
- Died: January 25, 1988 (aged 88); Paso Robles, California, U.S.
- Occupation: Actress
- Years active: 1916–1934
- Spouses: John McCormick (m. 1923; div. 1930) Albert P. Scott (m. 1932; div. 1934) Homer P. Hargrave (m. 1937; died 1964) Paul Magenot (m. 1983)
- Relatives: Walter Howey (uncle)

Colleen Moore (born Kathleen Morrison; August 19, 1899 – January 25, 1988) was an American film actress who began her career during the silent film era and continued into the early sound film era. Moore became one of the most fashionable (and highly-paid) stars of the era and helped popularize the bobbed haircut.

Moore was a huge star in her day. She made 64 films in total; 30 are extant in their entirety, 7 are partially lost and 27 are completely lost. Moore donated prints of 15 of her films to the Museum of Modern Art for preservation. Unfortunately, the films were preserved so poorly that they disintegrated beyond restoration over the years, which deeply distressed her. Ten of those films survive in full, and another 3 were damaged but some parts remain; only 2 of the films were completely destroyed. Her first two talking pictures, Smiling Irish Eyes and Footlights and Fools, both from 1929, are lost, apart from the Vitaphone soundtrack disks. What was perhaps her most celebrated film, Flaming Youth (1923), is now mostly lost as well, with only one 11-minute reel surviving.

Moore took a hiatus from acting between 1929 and 1933, just as sound was being added to motion pictures. After she returned, her last four sound pictures, The Power and the Glory (1933), Social Register (1934), Success at Any Price (1934), and The Scarlet Letter (1934), were not financial successes. She then retired permanently from screen acting.

After her film career, Moore maintained her wealth through astute investments, becoming a partner of Merrill Lynch. She later wrote a "how-to" book about investing in the stock market.

Moore also nurtured a passion for dollhouses throughout her life and helped design and curate The Colleen Moore Dollhouse, which has been a featured exhibit at the Museum of Science and Industry in Chicago since 1949. The dollhouse, measuring 9 square feet (0.84 m^{2}), was estimated in 1985 to be worth $7 million, and it is seen by 1.5 million people annually.

== Early life ==
Moore was born Kathleen Morrison on August 19, 1899 (according to the bulk of the official records; (Note: The issue of her birth date is addressed on page 9 of the second chapter of Colleen Moore, A Biography of the Silent Film Star, citing records that mention the birth of a child to the family of Charles and Agnes Morrison in the Port Huron Daily Times in August 1899. A child named "Kathleen Morrison" was mentioned in the 1900 census, two years before the birth date she often gave. Furthermore, her brother's birth was recorded in St. Clair County birth record #6031, page 153, as being on June 10, 1901; Moore always said she was two years older than her brother. However, this birth date would have made Cleeve one year older than his sister.) the date which she insisted was correct in her autobiography, Silent Star, was 1902), in Port Huron, Michigan. Moore was the eldest child of Charles R. and Agnes Kelly Morrison. The family remained in Port Huron during the early years of Moore's life, at first living with her grandmother Mary Kelly (often spelled Kelley) and then with at least one of Moore's aunts. (Note: Household occupants listed in the 1900 census as: Mary Kelly, head of household; Kathleen (Moore's aunt), daughter; Charles Morrison, son-in-law; Agnes Morrison, daughter; and Kathleen Morrison with birth-date given as August 1899. Additionally: "Morrison, Chas R, collector Commercial Bank, res 817 Ontario")

By 1905, the family had moved to Hillsdale, Michigan, where they remained for over two years. They had relocated to Atlanta, Georgia, by 1908. They are listed at three different addresses during their stay in Atlanta (from the Atlanta-Fulton Public Library city directories): 301 Capitol Avenue in 1908, 41 Linden Avenue in 1909, and 240 N. Jackson Street in 1910. They then lived briefly—probably for less than a year—in Warren, Pennsylvania, and by 1911, they had settled in Tampa, Florida.

At the age of 15, she took her first step into Hollywood. Her uncle arranged a screen test with director D. W. Griffith. She wanted to be a second Lillian Gish, but instead, she found herself playing heroines in Westerns with stars such as Tom Mix.

Two of Moore's great passions were dolls and movies; each would play a great role in her later life. She and her brother began their own stock company, reportedly performing on a stage created from a piano packing crate. Her aunts, who doted on her, indulged her other great passion and often bought her miniature furniture on their many trips, with which she furnished the first of a succession of dollhouses. Moore's family summered in Chicago, where she enjoyed baseball and the company of her Aunt Lib (Elizabeth, who changed her name to "Liberty", Lib for short) and Lib's husband, Walter Howey. Howey was the managing editor of the Chicago Examiner and an important newspaper editor in the publishing empire of William Randolph Hearst, and he was the inspiration for Walter Burns, the fictional Chicago newspaper editor in the play and the film The Front Page.

== Career ==
=== Early years ===
Essanay Studios was within walking distance of the Northwestern L, which ran right past the Howey residence. (They occupied at least two residences between 1910 and 1916: 4161 Sheridan and 4942 Sheridan.) In interviews later in her silent film career, Moore claimed she had appeared in the background of several Essanay films, usually as a face in a crowd. One story has it that she got into the Essanay studios and waited in line to be an extra with Helen Ferguson: in an interview with Kevin Brownlow many years later, Ferguson told a story that substantially confirmed many details of the claim, though it is not certain whether she was referring to Moore's stints as a background extra (if she really was one) or to her film test there prior to her departure for Hollywood in November 1917. Film producer D. W. Griffith was in debt to Howey, who had helped him to get both The Birth of a Nation and Intolerance through the Chicago censorship board:

I was being sent to Hollywood—not because anybody out there thought I was any good, but simply to pay off a favor.

The contract to Griffith's Triangle-Fine Arts was conditional on passing a film test to ensure that her heterochromia (she had one brown eye, one blue eye) would not be a distraction in close-up shots. Her eyes passed the test, so she left for Hollywood with her grandmother and her mother as chaperones. Moore made her first credited film appearance in 1917 in The Bad Boy for Triangle Fine Arts, and for the next few years appeared in small, supporting roles gradually attracting the attention of the public.

The Bad Boy was released on February 18, and featured Robert Harron, Richard Cummings, Josephine Crowell, and Mildred Harris (who would later become Charles Chaplin's first wife). Two months later, it was followed by An Old-Fashioned Young Man, again with Robert Harron. Moore's third film was Hands Up!, filmed in part in the vicinity of the Seven Oaks (a popular location for productions that required dramatic vistas). This was her first true western. The film's scenario was written by Wilfred Lucas from a story by Al Jennings, the famous outlaw who had been freed from jail by presidential pardon by Theodore Roosevelt in 1907. Monte Blue was in the cast and noticed Moore could not mount her horse, though horseback riding was required for the part (during casting for the part, she neglected to mention she did not know how to ride). Blue gave her a quick lesson, essentially consisting of how to mount the horse and how to hold on.

On May 3, 1917, the Chicago Daily Tribune said: "Colleen Moore contributes some remarkable bits of acting. She is very sweet as she goes trustingly to her bandit hero, and, O, so pitiful, when finally realizing the character of the man, she goes into a hysteria of terror, and, shrieking 'Daddy, Daddy, Daddy!' beats futilely on a bolted door, a panic-stricken little human animal, who had not known before that there was aught but kindness in the world." About the time her first six-month contract was extended an additional six months, she requested and received five weeks' release to do a film for Universal's Bluebird division, released under the name The Savage. This was her fourth film, and she was only needed for two weeks. Upon her return to the Fine Arts lot, she spent several weeks trying to get her pay for the three weeks she had been available for work for Triangle (finally receiving it in December of that year).

Soon after, the Triangle Company went bust, and while her contract was honored, she found herself scrambling to find her next job. With a reel of her performance in Hands Up! under her arm, Colin Campbell arranged for her to get a contract with Selig Polyscope. She was very likely at work on A Hoosier Romance before The Savage was released in November. After A Hoosier Romance, she went to work on Little Orphant Annie. Both films were based upon poems by James Whitcomb Riley, and both proved to be very popular. It was her first real taste of popularity.

Little Orphant Annie was released in December. The Chicago Daily Tribune wrote of Moore, "She was a lovely and unspoiled child the last time I saw her. Let's hope commendation hasn't turned her head." Despite her good notices, her luck took a turn for the worse when Selig Polyscope went bust. Once again, Moore found herself unemployed, but she had begun to make a name for herself by 1919. She had a series of films lined up. She went to Flagstaff, Arizona, for location work on The Wilderness Trail, another western, this time with Tom Mix. Her mother went along as a chaperone. Moore wrote that while she had a crush on Mix, he only had eyes for her mother. The Wilderness Trail was a Fox Film Corporation production, and while it had started production earlier, it would not be released until after The Busher, which was released on May 18. The Busher was an H. Ince Productions-Famous Players–Lasky production; it was a baseball film whose hero was played by Charles Ray. The Wilderness Trail followed on July 6, another Fox film. The Man in the Moonlight, a Universal Film Manufacturing Company film, was released a few weeks later on July 28. The Egg Crate Wallop was a Famous Players–Lasky production released by Paramount Pictures on September 28.

Moore acting in a scene from the 1927 silent film Her Wild Oat.

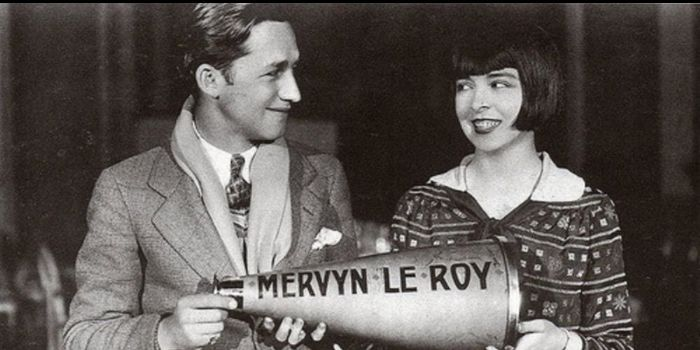
Mervyn LeRoy on the set of Oh, Kay! (1928) alongside Moore

=== Success ===
The next stage of her career was with the Christie Film Company, a move she made when she decided she needed comic training. While with Christie she made Her Bridal Nightmare, A Roman Scandal, and So Long Letty. At the same time as she was working on these films, she worked on The Devil's Claim with Sessue Hayakawa (in which she played a Persian woman), When Dawn Came, and His Nibs (1921) with Chic Sale. All the while, Marshall Neilan had been attempting to get Moore released from her contract so she could work for him. He was successful and made Dinty with Moore, releasing near the end of 1920, followed by When Dawn Came.

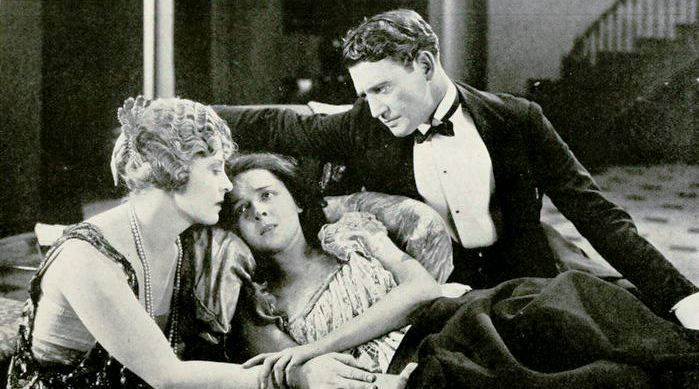
Film still of Gertrude Astor, Moore, and Richard Dix from The Wall Flower (1922)

For all his efforts to win Moore away from Christie, it seems Neilan loaned Moore to other studios most of the time. He loaned her out to King Vidor for The Sky Pilot, released in May 1921, yet another Western. After working on The Sky Pilot on location in the snows of Truckee, she was off to Catalina Island for work on The Lotus Eater with John Barrymore. In October 1921, His Nibs was released, her only film to be released that year besides The Sky Pilot. In His Nibs, Moore actually appeared in a film within the film; the framing film was a comedy vehicle for Chic Sales. The film it framed was a spoof on films of the time. 1922 proved to be an eventful year for Moore; she was named a WAMPAS Baby Star during a "frolic" at the Ambassador Hotel, which became an annual event, in recognition of her growing popularity. In early 1922, Come On Over was released, made from a Rupert Hughes story and directed by Alfred E. Green. Hughes directed Moore himself in The Wallflower, released that same year. Additionally, Neilan introduced her to John McCormick, a publicist who had had his eye on Moore ever since he had first seen her photograph. He had prodded Marshall into an introduction. The two hit it off, and before long, they were engaged. By the end of that year, three more of her films were released: Forsaking All Others, The Ninety and Nine, and Broken Chains.

Look Your Best was released in early 1923, followed by two Cosmopolitan Productions, The Nth Commandment and Through the Dark. By this time, Moore had publicly confirmed her engagement to McCormick, a fact that she had been coy about to the press previously. Before mid-year, she had signed a contract with First National Pictures, and her first two films were slated to be The Huntress and Flaming Youth. Slippy McGee came out in June, followed by Broken Hearts of Broadway.

Moore and John McCormick married while Flaming Youth was still in production and just before the release of The Savage. When it was finally released in 1923, Flaming Youth, in which she starred opposite actor Milton Sills, was a hit. The controversial story put Moore in focus as a flapper, but after Clara Bow took the stage in Black Oxen in December, she gradually lost her momentum. In spring 1924, she made a good but unsuccessful effort to top Bow in The Perfect Flapper, and soon after, she dismissed the whole flapper vogue: "No more flappers ... people are tired of soda-pop love affairs." Decades later Moore stated Bow was her "chief rival".

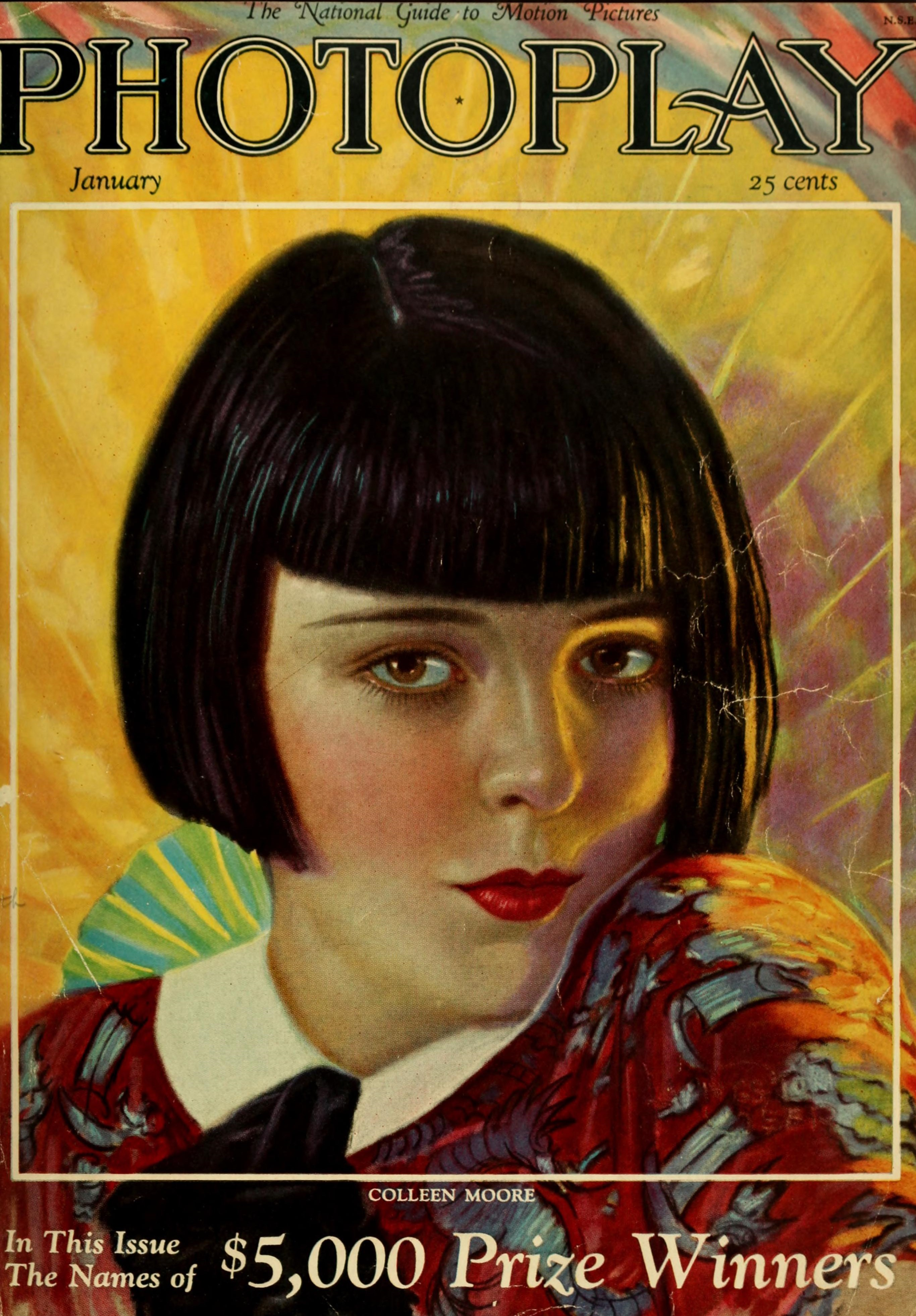
Moore on cover of Photoplay magazine, 1926

Through the Dark, originally shot under the name Daughter of Mother McGinn, was released during the height of the Flaming Youth furor in January 1924. Three weeks later, Painted People was released. After that, she was to star in Counterfeit. The film went through a number of title changes before being released as Flirting with Love in August. In October, First National purchased the rights to Sally for Moore's next film. It would be a challenge, as Sally was a musical comedy. In December, First National purchased the rights to Desert Flower and in so doing had mapped out Moore's schedule for 1925: Sally would be filmed first, followed by The Desert Flower.

By the late 1920s, she had accomplished dramatic roles in films such as So Big, where Moore aged through a stretch of decades, and was also well received in light comedies such as Irene. An overseas tour was planned to coincide with the release of So Big in Europe, and Moore saw the tour as her first real opportunity to spend time with her husband, John McCormick. Both she and John McCormick were dedicated to their careers, and their hectic schedules had kept them from spending any quality time together. Moore wanted a family; it was one of her goals.

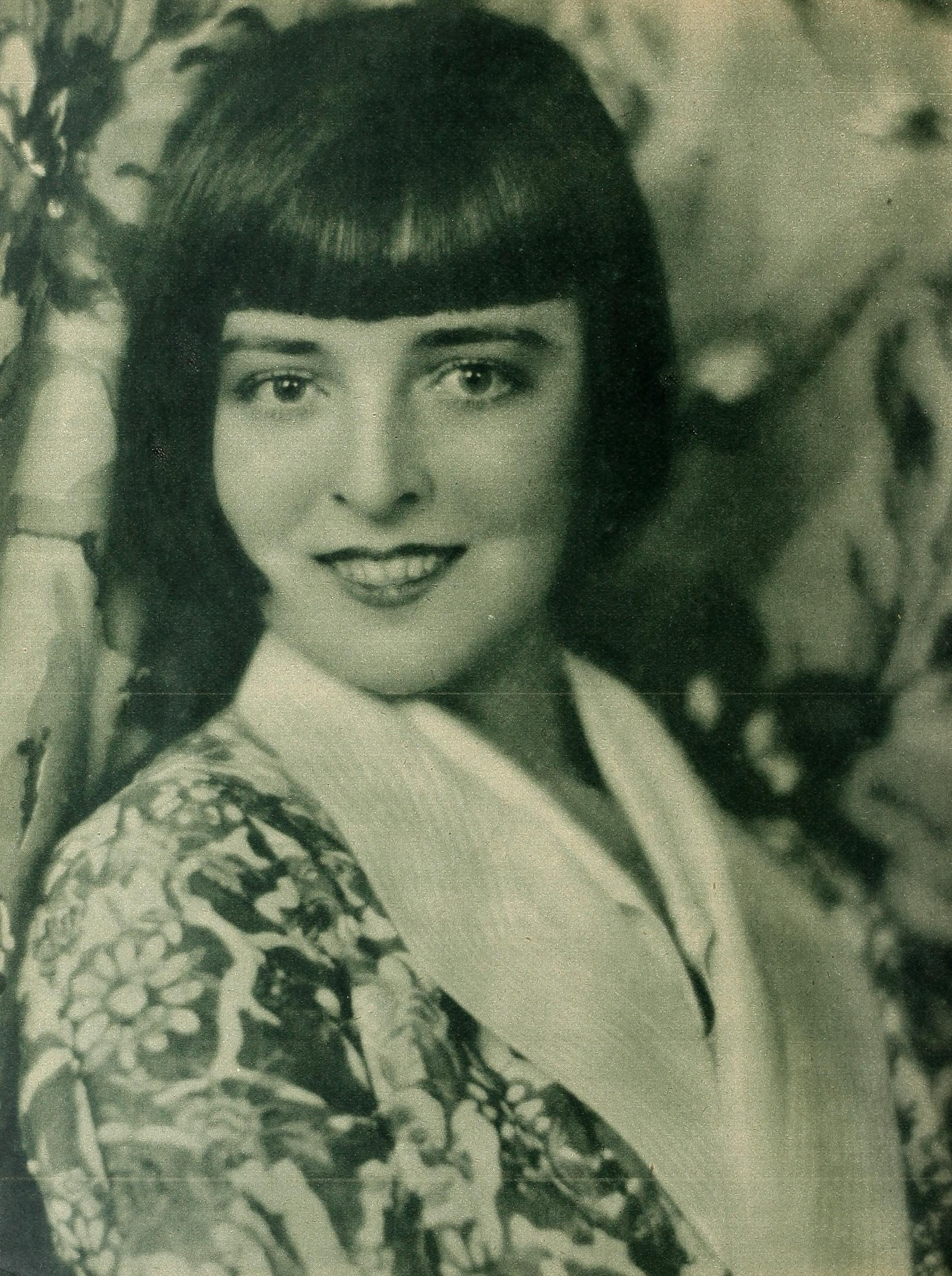
Promotional portrait of Moore at the height of her fame, c. 1927, showing the famous Dutch boy bobbed haircut that she made famous, and which she apparently kept until the day she died

Plans for the trip were put in jeopardy when she injured her neck during the filming of The Desert Flower. Her injury forced the production to shut down while Moore spent six weeks in a body cast in bed. Once out of the cast, she completed the film and left for Europe on a triumphal tour. When she returned, she negotiated a new contract with First National. Her films had been great hits, so her terms were very generous. Her first film upon her return to the States was We Moderns, set in England with location work done in London during the tour. It was a comedy, essentially a retelling of Flaming Youth from an English perspective. This was followed by Irene (another musical in the style of the very popular Sally) and Ella Cinders, a straight comedy that featured a cameo appearance by comedian Harry Langdon. It Must Be Love was a romantic comedy with dramatic undertones, and it was followed by Twinkletoes, a dramatic film that featured Moore as a young dancer in London's Limehouse district during the previous century. Orchids and Ermine was released in 1927, filmed in part in New York, a thinly veiled Cinderella story.

In 1927, Moore split from her studio after her husband suddenly quit. It is rumored that John McCormick was about to be fired for his drinking and that she left as a means of leveraging her husband back into a position at First National. It worked, and McCormick found himself as Moore's sole producer. Moore's popularity allowed her productions to become very large and lavish. Lilac Time was one of the bigger productions of the era, a World War I drama. A million-dollar film, it made back every penny spent within months. Prior to its release, Warner Bros. had taken control of First National and were less than interested in maintaining the terms of her contract until the numbers started to roll in for Lilac Time. The film was such a hit that Moore managed to retain generous terms in her next contract and her husband as her producer.

=== Colleen Moore Fairy Castle (Dollhouse) ===
In 1928, with help from her former set designer, a dollhouse was constructed by her father, which was 9 square feet, with the tallest tower 12 feet high. The interior of the Colleen Moore Dollhouse, designed by Harold Grieve, features miniature bear-skin rugs and detailed furniture and art. Moore's dollhouse has been a featured exhibit at the Museum of Science and Industry in Chicago since October 30, 1949, where, according to the museum, it is seen by 1.5 million people each year and would be worth $7 million. Moore continued working on it and contributing artifacts to it until her death.

This dollhouse was the eighth one Moore owned. The first dollhouse, she wrote in her autobiography Silent Star (1968), evolved from a cabinet that held her collection of miniature furniture. It was supposedly built from a cigar box. Kitty Lorgnette wrote in the edition of The Evening News (Tampa, Florida) for Saturday, August 13, 1938, that the first dollhouse was purchased by Oraleze O'Brien (Mrs. Frank J. Knight) in 1916, when Moore (then Kathleen) left Tampa. Oraleze was too big for dollhouses, however, and she sold it again after her cat had kittens in it, and from there, she lost track of it. The third house was possibly given to the daughter of Moore's good friend, author Adela Rogers St. Johns. The fourth survives and remains on display in the living room of a relative.

=== Sound films ===
With the advent of talking pictures in 1929, Moore took a hiatus from acting. After divorcing McCormick in 1930, Moore married the prominent New York-based stockbroker Albert Parker Scott in 1932. The couple lived at that time in a lavish home at 345 St. Pierre Road in Bel Air, where they hosted parties for and were supporters of the U.S. Olympic team, especially the yachting team, during the 1932 Summer Olympics held in Los Angeles.

In 1934, by then divorced from Albert Parker Scott, Moore returned to work in Hollywood. She appeared in three films, none of which was successful, after which she retired. Her last film was a version of The Scarlet Letter in 1934. She later married the widower Homer Hargrave and raised his children (she never had children of her own) from a previous marriage, with whom she maintained a lifelong close relationship. Throughout her life, she also maintained close friendships with other colleagues from the silent film era, such as King Vidor and Mary Pickford.

== Later years ==
Moore in Kevin Brownlow's series Hollywood (1980) recalls that the models for her hairstyle were Japanese dolls.

In the 1960s, Moore formed a television production company with King Vidor, with whom she had worked in the 1920s. She published two books in the late 1960s, How Women Can Make Money in the Stock Market (1969) and her autobiography, Silent Star: Colleen Moore Talks About Her Hollywood (1968). She also figures prominently alongside Vidor in Sidney D. Kirkpatrick's book, A Cast of Killers, which recounts Vidor's attempt to make a film about and solve the murder of William Desmond Taylor. In that book, she is recalled as having been a successful real-estate broker in Chicago and partner in the investment firm Merrill Lynch after her film career.

At the height of her fame, Moore was earning $12,500 per week. She was an astute investor, and through her investments remained wealthy for the rest of her life. In her later years, she would frequently attend film festivals and was a popular interview subject, always willing to discuss her Hollywood career. She was a participant in the documentary series Hollywood (1980), providing her recollections of Hollywood's silent film era.

== Personal life ==
Moore was married four times. Her first marriage was to John McCormick of First National Studios. They married in 1923 and divorced in 1930. In 1932, Moore married the stockbroker Albert P. Scott. The union ended in divorce in 1934. Moore's third marriage was to another stockbroker, Homer Hargrave, whom she married in 1936. He provided funding for her dollhouse and she adopted his son, Homer Hargrave Jr, and his daughter, Judy Hargrave. The couple remained married until Hargrave's death in 1964. In 1982, she married the builder Paul Magenot, and they remained together until Moore's death in 1988.

== Death and legacy ==
On January 25, 1988, Moore died at age 88 from cancer in Paso Robles, California. For her contributions to the motion picture industry, Colleen Moore has a star on the Hollywood Walk of Fame at 1551 Vine Street.

F. Scott Fitzgerald wrote of her: "I was the spark that lit up Flaming Youth, Colleen Moore was the torch. What little things we are to have caused all that trouble."

== Filmography ==
Year	Title	Role	Preservation Status
1916	The Prince of Graustark	Maid (Note: Uncredited)	Extant
1917	The Bad Boy	Ruth	Lost
1917	An Old-Fashioned Young Man	Margaret	Lost
1917	Hands Up!	Marjorie Houston	Lost
1917	The Little American	Nurse	Extant
1917	The Savage	Lizette	Lost
1918	A Hoosier Romance	Patience Thompson	Lost
1918	Little Orphant Annie	Annie	Extant
1919	The Busher	Mazie Palmer	Extant
1919	The Wilderness Trail	Jeanne Fitzpatrick	Lost
1919	The Man in the Moonlight	Rosine	Extant; A copy is held at the George Eastman Museum
1919	The Egg Crate Wallop	Kitty Haskell	Extant; A copy is held at the Gosfilmofond
1919	Common Property	Tatyoe (Tatyana)	Lost
1919	A Roman Scandal	Mary	Extant
1920	The Cyclone	Sylvia Sturgis	Lost
1920	Her Bridal Nightmare	Mary	Extant
1920	When Dawn Came	Mary Harrison	Extant; A copy is held at the Library of Congress
1920	The Devil's Claim	Indora	Incomplete; A copy is held at the George Eastman Museum
1920	So Long Letty	Grace Miller	Extant
1920	Dinty	Doreen O'Sullivan	Extant; A copy is held at the EYE Film Institute Netherlands
1921	The Sky Pilot	Gwen	Extant
1921	His Nibs	The Girl	Extant; A copy is held at the UCLA Film & Television Archive
1921	The Lotus Eater	Mavis	Lost
1922	Come On Over	Moyna Killiea	Lost
1922	The Wampas Baby Stars of 1922	Self	Lost
1922	The Wall Flower	Idalene Nobbin	Lost
1922	Affinities	Fanny Illington	Lost
1922	Forsaking All Others	Penelope Mason	Lost
1922	Broken Chains	Mercy Boone	Extant; A copy is held at the George Eastman Museum
1922	The Ninety and Nine	Ruth Blake	A condensed incomplete ten minute version exists
1923	Look Your Best	Perla Quaranta	Lost
1923	The Nth Commandment	Sarah Juke	An incomplete copy is held at the Library of Congress
1923	Slippy McGee	Mary Virginia	Lost
1923	Broken Hearts of Broadway	Mary Ellis	Extant
1923	The Huntress	Bela	Lost
1923	April Showers	Maggie Muldoon	Lost
1923	Flaming Youth	Patricia Fentriss	An incomplete copy with one reel is held at the Library of Congress
1924	Through the Dark	Mary McGinn	An incomplete copy is held at the Library of Congress
1924	Painted People	Ellie Byrne	Lost
1924	The Perfect Flapper	Tommie Lou Pember	Extant; A print is held at the Library of Congress
1924	Flirting with Love	Gilda Lamont	Lost
1924	So Big	Selina Peake	Lost; Trailer survives at Library of Congress
1925	Sally	Sally	Lost
1925	The Desert Flower	Maggie Fortune	Lost
1925	We Moderns	Mary Sundale	Lost
1925	Ben-Hur: A Tale of the Christ	Crowd extra in chariot race	Extant
1926	Irene	Irene	Extant
1926	Ella Cinders	Ella Cinders	Extant
1926	It Must Be Love	Fernie Schmidt	Lost
1926	Twinkletoes	Twink "Twinkletoes" Minasi	Extant
1927	Orchids and Ermine	"Pink" Watson	Extant
1927	Naughty but Nice	Bernice Sumners	Extant
1927	Her Wild Oat	Mary Lou Smith	Extant
1928	Happiness Ahead	Mary Randall	Lost; Trailer exists
1928	Oh, Kay!	Lady Kay Rutfield	Extant; A copy is held at the EYE Film Institute Netherlands
1928	Lilac Time (Note: Alternative title: Love Never Dies)	Jeannine Berthelot	Extant; Vitaphone music + sound effects (Note: Some Vitaphone discs survive; these include reels 1, 5–7 and the exit music.)
1929	Synthetic Sin	Betty	Extant; A copy is held at the Cineteca Italiana; Vitaphone music + sound effects (Note: Most of the Vitaphone discs are lost, apart from reel 6.)
1929	Why Be Good?	Pert Kelly	Extant; Vitaphone music + sound effects
1929	Smiling Irish Eyes	Kathleen O'Connor	Lost; Soundtrack exists
1929	Footlights and Fools	Betty Murphy/Fifi D'Auray	Lost; Soundtrack exists
1933	The Power and the Glory (Note: Alternative title: Power and Glory)	Sally Garner	Extant
1934	Social Register	Patsy Shaw	Extant
1934	Success at Any Price	Sarah Griswold	Extant
1934	The Scarlet Letter	Hester Prynne	Extant

== Bibliography ==
- Basinger, Jeanine (1999). "Colleen Moore". Silent Stars. ISBN 0-8195-6451-6.
- Bermingham, Cedric Osmond (1931). Stars of the Screen, 1931: A Volume of Biographies of Contemporary Actors and Actresses Engaged in Photoplay Throughout the World.
- Codori, Jeff (2012). Colleen Moore: A Biography of the Silent Film Star. McFarland & Company. ISBN 978-0-7864-4969-9. Archived from the original on August 4, 2011. Also available as ebook (ISBN 978-0-7864-8899-5).
- Kobal, John (1985). People Will Talk.
- Mitchell, Glenn (1998). A–Z of Silent Film Comedy, An Illustrated Companion.
- Moore, Colleen (1968). Silent Star: Colleen Moore Talks About Her Hollywood. Garden City, NY: Doubleday.
