= Walter Howey =

American journalist and editor

- Born: January 16, 1882; Fort Dodge, Iowa
- Died: March 21, 1954 (aged 72); Boston
- Occupation: Newspaper editor
- Spouse(s): Elizabeth Board, 1900–1935 (her death); Gloria Ritz, 1936–1954 (her death)
- Children: William Randolph Howey
- Relatives: Colleen Moore (niece)

Walter Crawford Howey (January 16, 1882 in Fort Dodge, Iowa – March 21, 1954 in Boston) was a Hearst newspaper editor and the model for Walter Burns, the scheming, ruthless managing editor in Ben Hecht and Charles MacArthur's play The Front Page.

== Early years ==
Walter Howey was the son of Frank Harris Howey and Rosa Crawford Howey. Frank Howey ran a series of small businesses. Walter was educated in Fort Dodge public schools and the Art Institute of Chicago, 1899-1900.

== Iowa and Chicago journalism ==
Howey became a reporter for the Fort Dodge Messenger in 1902 and then worked for the Des Moines Daily Capital before joining Hearst's Chicago American. Walking in Chicago, Howey was startled to see a knight and three elves climb out of a manhole. He had stumbled upon four actors fleeing a devastating blaze that killed 600 people, the Iroquois Theatre fire. As more people escaped via the theater cellar through the sewers, Howey reported his scoop, and the story, one of the biggest in Chicago's history, established his reputation for speed, resourcefulness, and skillful writing. Howey became city editor of the Chicago Inter Ocean in 1906 and moved to the Chicago Tribune in 1907. Lured away by Hearst, he became managing editor of the Chicago American in 1917.

== Boston and New York journalism ==
In 1922, Howey moved to Boston as editor of Hearst's Boston American and then, in 1924, to New York, where in ten days he set up the tabloid New York Daily Mirror. In 1939, after serving as organizational assistant to Hearst, Howey returned to Boston as editor of the Record-American. From 1942 to 1944 he edited the Chicago Herald-American, after which he served again as special editorial assistant to Hearst from 1944 until Hearst's death in 1951. Returning to Boston, Howey served until his death as executive editor of the Boston Evening American, the Daily Record, and the Sunday Advertiser.

== The Front Page ==
Howey was the prototype for Walter Burns, the scheming, ruthless managing editor, in Ben Hecht and Charles MacArthur's 1928 play The Front Page. Howey had a glass eye that some attributed to the circulation wars and others to his drunkenly passing out and impaling himself on a copy spike. Hecht famously remarked that you could tell the glass eye because it was the warmer one.

== Inventor ==
In 1931, Howey patented an automatic photoelectric engraving process, and he developed the sound photo system of transmitting photographs by wire.

== Death ==
Howey was critically injured on January 14, 1954, in an automobile accident, but he continued to run Hearst's Boston papers until his death, March 21, 1954, while recuperating at home in Boston. He is buried in St Michael's Cemetery, Queens, New York.

== Family ==
Wife Gloria Ritz Howey Gloria Ritz was the daughter of John Ritz of New York and had a sister, Thelma Ritz, who died in Florida at the age of 87. Mrs. Howey was an aunt to her sister's son, Ronald Lawrence Hurwitz, born in 1937 in New York.

Son William R. Howey (named after William Randolph Hearst, his godfather.

Howey was the uncle of actress Colleen Moore.
