= So Long Letty (1920 film) =

1920 film by Al Christie

- Directed by: Al Christie
- Written by: Scott Darling (scenario)
- Based on: So Long Letty by Oliver Morosco, Elmer Harris, and Earl Carroll
- Produced by: Al Christie
- Starring: T. Roy Barnes; Walter Hiers; Grace Darmond; Colleen Moore
- Cinematography: Anton Nagy; Stephen Rounds
- Music by: James C. Bradford
- Production company: Christie Film Company
- Distributed by: Robertson-Cole Distributing Corporation
- Release date: October 20, 1920
- Running time: 6 reels
- Country: United States
- Language: Silent (English intertitles)

So Long Letty is a 1920 American silent comedy film directed by Al Christie and starring Grace Darmond, T. Roy Barnes, and Colleen Moore. It was an adaptation of a 1916 popular stage comedy musical of the same name that starred Charlotte Greenwood. A print of So Long Letty exists.

== Plot ==
Harry Miller (Barnes) is a party boy who loves the cabaret scene and nights on the town while his wife Grace is a homebody, distressed by her husband's errant ways. Their neighbors are the opposite. Tommy Robbins (Walter Hiers) likes domestic life and home cooking while his wife Letty (Darmond) is devoted to the wild life. Harry and Tommy hatch a plan to solve their problems; that they divorce their wives and swap. The wives overhear the plan and go along with the suggestion, though following a plan of their own. They suggest a week-long trial period of platonic marriage, during which the wives do all they can to make their new potential mates miserable. In the end the husbands are happy with the wives who they have married.

== Cast ==
- T. Roy Barnes as Harry Miller
- Colleen Moore as Grace Miller
- Walter Hiers as Tommy Robbins
- Grace Darmond as Letty Robbins

== Production ==
The Christie Film Company purchased the rights to the play So Long Letty from Oliver Morosco for $40,000 (equivalent to $642,857 in 2025).

== Remake ==
The film was remade by Warner Bros. in 1929 under the same title. The 1929 version stars Charlotte Greenwood in the titular role. Greenwood was the star of the original 1916 Broadway play.

== Bibliography ==
- Codori, Jeff (2012), Colleen Moore; A Biography of the Silent Film Star, McFarland Publishing, Print ISBN 978-0-7864-4969-9, EBook ISBN 978-0-7864-8899-5.
