= Seastrom =

Seastrom is a surname. Notable people with the surname include:

- Dorothy Seastrom (1903–1930), American silent film actress
- Marilyn Seastrom (born 1951), American statistician
- Victor Seastrom (1879–1960), Swedish film director, screenwriter, and actor
