= John McCormick (producer) =

American film producer (1893–1961)

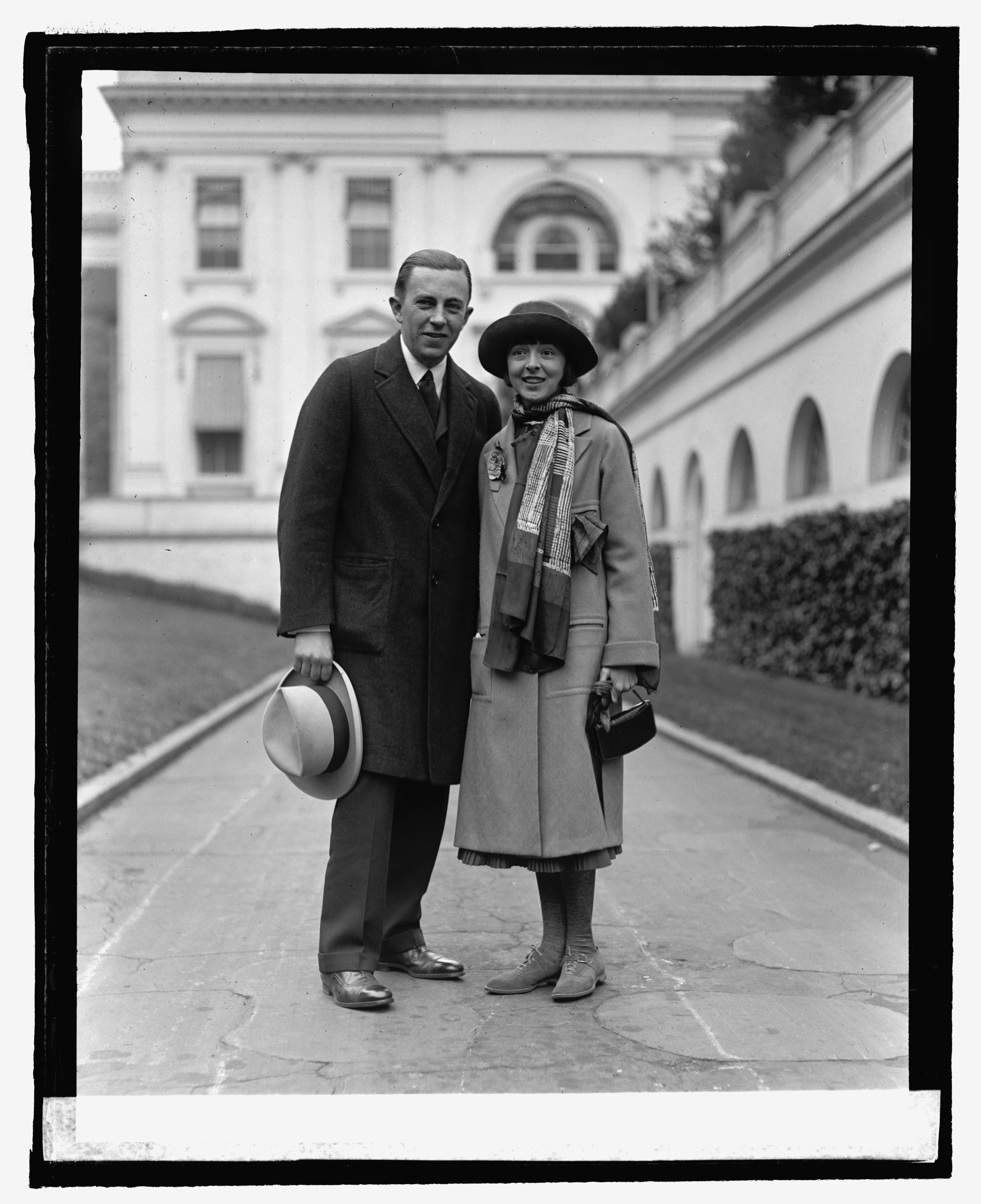
- Colleen Moore and John McCormick in 1925
- Born: August 17, 1893; Kansas City, Missouri, U.S.
- Died: May 3, 1961 (aged 67); Los Angeles, California, U.S.
- Occupations: Press agent, Production manager, Producer
- Spouse(s): Colleen Moore (m. 1923; div. 1930) Janet Gaddis (m. 1931; div. 1931) Zita Johann (m. 1935; div. 1938)

John McCormick (August 17, 1893 – May 3, 1961) was an American film producer associated with the Hollywood studio First National Pictures.

== Biography ==
He was born John Emmett McCormick on August 17, 1893 in Kansas City, Missouri.

McCormick was a press agent, production manager and film producer in the 1920s.

From 1923 to 1930, McCormick was married to Colleen Moore, one of the highest-paid and most popular stars of the silent era. When they married, McCormick was just Moore's press agent, but he later took control of her career.

McCormick initially was unconvinced by the development of sound films and vetoed Moore's appearing in them. He changed his mind in 1929 and placed Moore in her first sound film, titled Smiling Irish Eyes, which was not a great success. Their marriage was under increasing strain, and in 1930, the couple divorced. His relationship with Moore is believed to have been the basis for the film What Price Hollywood? (1932).

Years later, in an interview with her niece, Melinda, Moore described how McCormick had begun to turn down roles for her without her consent or even her knowledge. He also took control of her finances, which led to her seeking divorce in 1930.

In 1930, McCormick announced his retirement from film-making at the age of 37, and went to Hawai'i to wait the finalization of his divorce from Moore. While in Hawai'i, he was linked romantically with British actress, Dorothy Mackaill, who had just called off her engagement to Neill Miller after their whirlwind romance. However, Mackaill sailed back alone to Los Angeles in May 1931, and about a week later McCormick married socialite, Janet Gettis, in 1931 in Honolulu, Hawai'i. At the time, Gettis had a daughter, Sally, from a prior marriage.

McCormick's marriage to Gettis did not last. He was then married to actress, Zita Johann from July 9, 1935 until their divorce on August 18, 1938.

McCormick died on May 3, 1961 of a heart attack.

== Partial filmography ==
- The Huntress (1923)
- Sally (1925)
- We Moderns (1925)
- Twinkletoes (1926)
- Irene (1926)
- Ella Cinders (1926)
- It Must Be Love (1926)
- Midnight Lovers (1926)
- Naughty but Nice (1927)
- Her Wild Oat (1927)
- Lilac Time (1928)
- Oh, Kay! (1928)
- Smiling Irish Eyes (1929)
- Footlights and Fools (1929)
- Synthetic Sin (1929)
- Why Be Good? (1929)

== Bibliography ==
- Crafton, Donald. The Talkies: American Cinema's Transition to Sound, 1926-1931. University of California Press, 1999.
