= Come On Over (film) =

1922 film

Come on Over
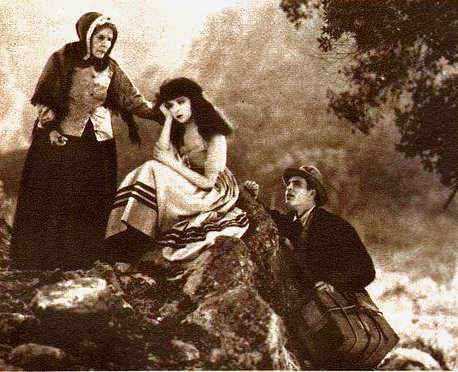
- Still from the film with Florence Drew, Colleen Moore, and Ralph Graves
- Directed by: Alfred E. Green
- Screenplay by: Rupert Hughes
- Story by: Rupert Hughes
- Cinematography: L. William O'Connell
- Production company: Goldwyn Pictures Corporation
- Distributed by: Goldwyn Pictures Corporation
- Release date: March 11, 1922
- Running time: 60 min
- Country: United States
- Language: Silent (English intertitles)

Come on Over is a 1922 American comedy silent black and white film directed by Alfred E. Green and based on the stage musical by Rupert Hughes. It stars Colleen Moore. Its release beat The Wall Flower to the theaters and it was well received.

== Plot ==
As described in a film magazine, L. William O'Connell bids a fond goodbye to Shane O'Mealia when he sets sail from Ireland to the United States. He promises that he will send for her. Three years then go by. He has ill luck in New York City, where he loses one job after another. After he helps Dugan reform from drink, the daughter Judy falls in love with Shane. Finally, Moyna comes to America with the Morahans and, misunderstanding Shane's interest in Judy, flies into a tantrum. However, it all ends happily.

== Cast ==
- Colleen Moore as Moyna Killiea
- Ralph Graves as Shane O'Mealia
- J. Farrell MacDonald as Michael Morahan
- Kate Price as Delia Morahan
- James A. Marcus as Carmody (as James Marcus)
- Kathleen O'Connor as Judy Dugan
- Florence Drew as Bridget Morahan
- Harold Holland as Myle Morahan
- Mary Warren as Kate Morahan
- Elinor Hancock as Mrs. Van Dusen
- Monte Collins as Dugan
- C.E. Mason as Barney
- C.B. Leasure as Priest
