= Irene (1926 film) =

1926 silent comedy film

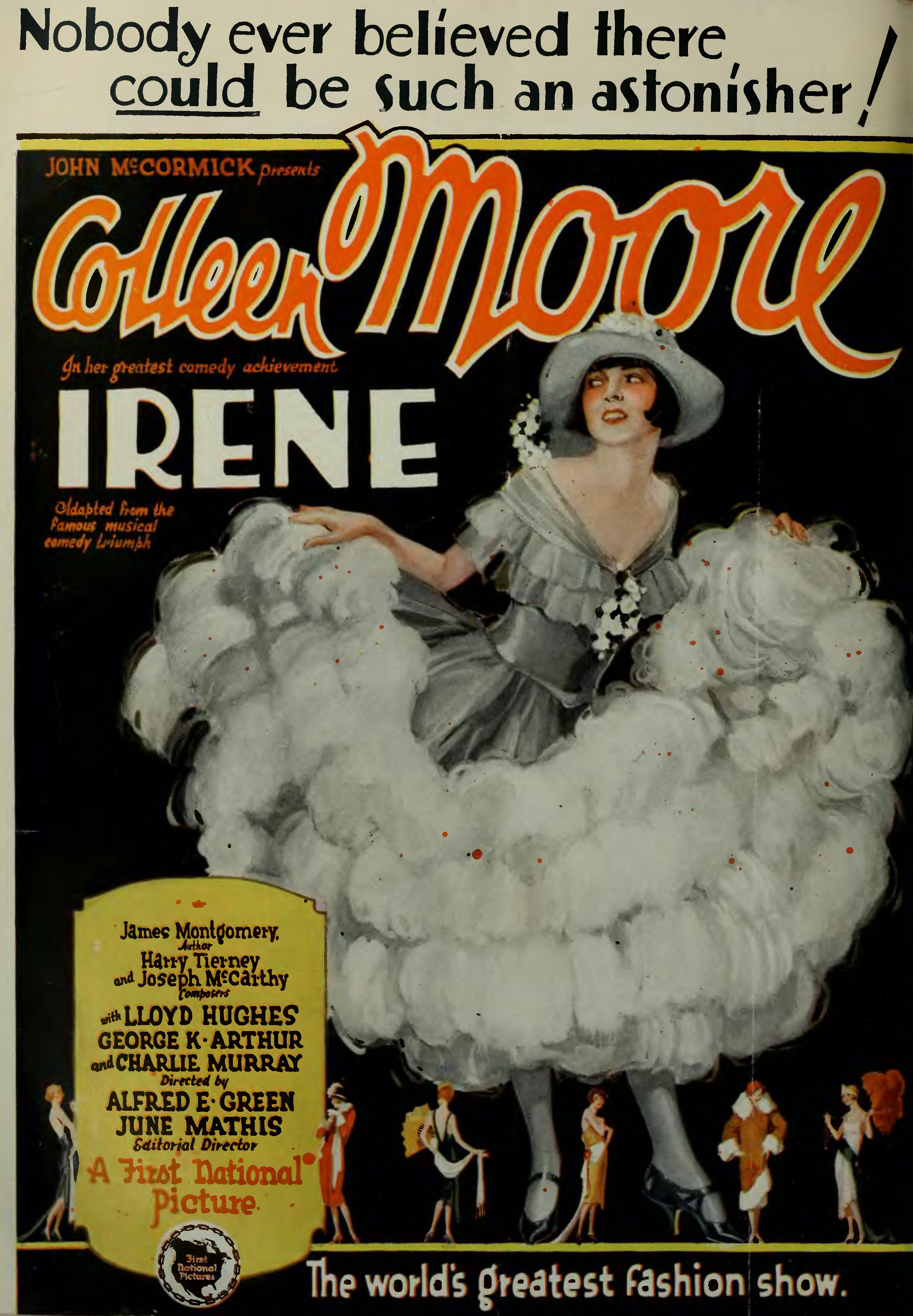
- Trade advertisement
- Directed by: Alfred E. Green
- Written by: June Mathis; Rex Taylor; George Marion, Jr.
- Based on: Irene (musical) by James Montgomery
- Produced by: John McCormick
- Starring: Colleen Moore; Lloyd Hughes; George K. Arthur
- Cinematography: Ted D. McCord
- Edited by: Edwin Robbins
- Music by: Harry Tierney; Joseph McCarthy
- Production company: First National Pictures
- Release date: February 21, 1926 (U.S.)
- Running time: 90 minutes
- Country: United States
- Language: Silent (English intertitles)

The full film

Irene is a 1926 pre-Code American silent romantic comedy film directed by Alfred E. Green, and produced by Colleen Moore's husband John McCormick. The film stars Moore, Lloyd Hughes, George K. Arthur, Ida Darling, Edward Earle, Bess Flowers and Charles Murray.

The film is based on the musical Irene written by James Montgomery with music and lyrics by Harry Tierney and Joseph McCarthy.

== Plot ==
As described in a film magazine review, Donald Marshall becomes a partner in a modiste shop and insists that Madame Lucy be made its operator. Young Irish woman Irene O'Dare graduates from being a demonstrator in the store window to being a successful model.

On the night of a big fashion show for society, Irene arouses Lucy's anger and is told to stay and watch the shop. Donald arrives and assures her that she will lead the show. Irene is a sensation, but her mother arrives and stops her promenade by taking her home. Donald follows and Irene is forgiven by her mother. Overhearing Irene confess to her mother of her love for him, Donald folds her into her arms.

== Cast ==
- Colleen Moore as Irene O'Dare
- Lloyd Hughes as Donald Marshall
- George K. Arthur as Madame Lucy
- Maryon Aye as Helen Cheston
- Ida Darling as Mrs. Warren Marshall
- Edward Earle as Larry Hadley
- Bess Flowers as Jane Gilmour
- Betty Francisco as Cordelia Smith (uncredited)
- Cora Macey as Mrs. Gilmour
- Charles Murray as Pa O'Dare
- Eva Novak as Eleanor Hadley
- Kate Price as Ma O'Dare
- Laurence Wheat as Bob Harrison
- Lydia Yeamans Titus as Mrs. Cheston

== Production ==
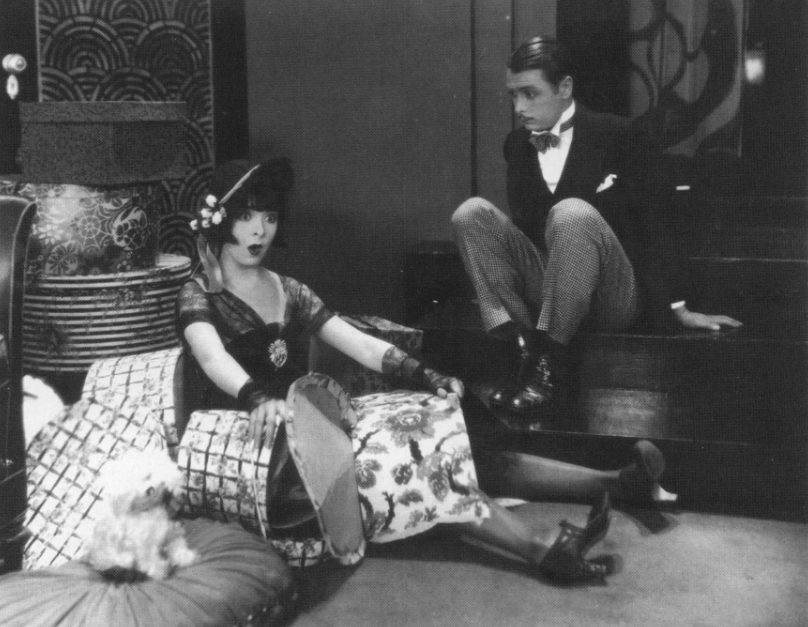
Irene causing havoc in department store while Madame Lucy looks on

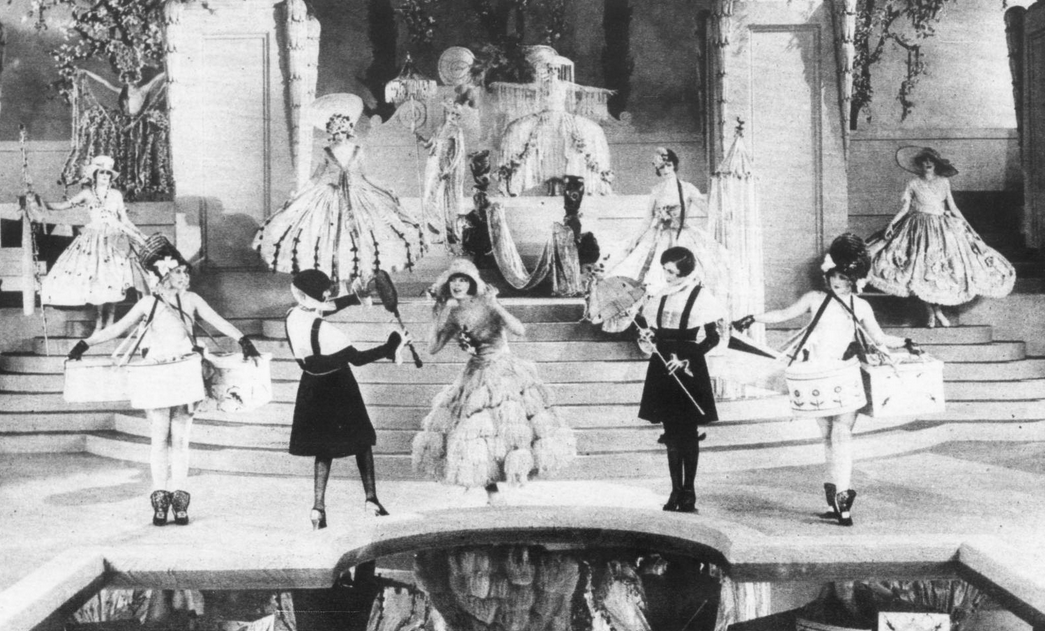
Fashion show scene with Irene in the middle

Richard Rowland, First National vice president, said they purchased the stage play for $60,000, because "the play contained the elements necessary to present one of our stars to the advantage we were seeking for her." The Film Daily reported in September 1925, that filming would being in October with John Francis Dillon directing the feature, and Dorothy Seastrom listed in the cast, but neither one of them remained with the project.

In October 1925, Variety Magazine announced that Alfred E. Green would be directing the film, and Dillon had been reassigned to direct Too Much Money. Principal photography began in October 1925, at United Studios in Hollywood, with the production being wrapped up by January 1926. Mervyn LeRoy, the assistant director, was dispatched to Los Angeles to look at department stores for inspiration for the project. In one particular store, he encountered trouble from the house detective who confronted him over his suspicious behavior, LeRoy told the detective the only thing he was "lifting" was ideas.

The fashion show scene near the end of the film required sixty "beautiful" girls who had to be "uniform in height and able to wear gorgeous gowns like a shop window model." Moore recalled that many of the girls were "winners from beauty contests staged in New York and other parts of the country." The outfits that Moore wore in the film were given to her, and since some of them were lined with fur, she removed it, and fashioned coats out of the fur.

== Preservation ==
In 1944, Moore gifted a copy of the film to the Museum of Modern Art in New York City, along with fourteen other films she starred in. There are also numerous other copies that exist with the technicolor sequences intact.

== Reception ==
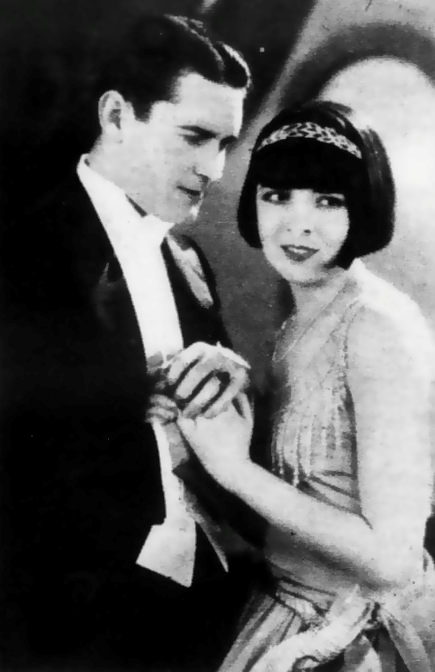
Collen Moore with Lloyd Hughes

Herbert Crooker from Midweek Pictorial opined that Colleen Moore does probably the best work of her career as the Irish Cinderella cutie and wears an array of gowns which brings forth squeals of joy and envy. My next medal is pinned on George K. Arthur, who furnishes comedy in the role of Mme. Lucy, although I fancy his heart was not in the role. Lloyd Hughes is a pleasing scion, and Charlie Murray and Kate Price supply a number of comedy moments.

Film historian Jeanine Basinger wrote "Irene seems to exist on film only because of Colleen Moore. It should have been called Colleen. It's truly a star vehicle, presenting her front and center in every scene. The camera stays pinned to Moore while she makes faces, pantomimes, does imitations, and takes a series of comedy pratfalls; she is utterly distinctive, looking like no one else — the mark of a star."

Time Magazine said that "Miss Moore is, as ever, keenly attractive, and the picture is medium good entertainment." Film historian Anthony Slide opined that "present-day gays looking for role models in silent films might feel shortchanged; obviously gay characters are strictly limited to camp and effeminate stereotypes like George Arthur as prissy Madame Lucy, the effeminate owner of a dress-making establishment. Arthur's comment to Colleen Moore, as the title character, that 'You walk almost like a man!' is met with the response, 'So do you!'"

Queer film historian Vito Russo observed that "Madame Lucy, given to severely tailored suits and lace hankies, is a whimsical creature described as a man living in a woman's world; he plays the snippy queen in a drag-like performance filled with extravagant gestures and eye popping; when he takes a first look at Irene, he exclaims 'As I live and hemstitch, she's impossible! Even I cannot make peach melba from a prune'."

== See also ==
- List of early color feature films
- List of American films of 1926
- List of LGBTQ-related films of the 1920s
- List of feature films with gay characters
