= Mervyn LeRoy =

American filmmaker (1900–1987)

- LeRoy in 1958
- Born: October 15, 1900; San Francisco, California, U.S.
- Died: September 13, 1987 (aged 86); Beverly Hills, California, U.S.
- Resting place: Forest Lawn Memorial Park (Glendale)
- Occupations: Film director; producer; actor
- Years active: 1928–1968
- Employer(s): First National Pictures (1927–1929); Warner Bros. (1929–1938); Metro-Goldwyn-Mayer (1938–1945) (1948–1954); Warner Bros. (1955–1959)
- Spouses: Edna Murphy (m. 1927; div. 1932); Doris Warner (m. 1934; div. 1942); Katherine Spiegel (m. 1946)
- Children: 2, including Warner

Mervyn LeRoy (/ləˈrɔɪ/; October 15, 1900 – September 13, 1987) was an American film director and producer. During the 1930s, he was one of the two great practitioners of economical and effective film directing at Warner Brothers studios, the other being his colleague Michael Curtiz. LeRoy's most acclaimed films of his tenure at Warners include Little Caesar (1931), I Am a Fugitive From a Chain Gang (1932), Gold Diggers of 1933 (1933), Anthony Adverse (1936), and They Won't Forget (1937). LeRoy left Warners and moved to Metro-Goldwyn-Mayer studios in 1939 to serve as both director and producer. He is best known for producing the 1939 film The Wizard of Oz, as well as for directing the 1951 Oscar-nominated film Quo Vadis.

== Early life ==
LeRoy was born on October 15, 1900, in San Francisco, California, the only child of Edna (née Armer) and Harry LeRoy, a well-to-do department store owner. His family was Jewish. Both his parents' families had fully assimilated, residing in the Bay Area for several generations. LeRoy described his relatives as "San Franciscans first, Americans second, Jews third."

LeRoy's mother was a frequent attendee at San Francisco's premier vaudeville venues, the Orpheum and the Alcazar, often socializing with the theater's personnel. She arranged for the six-year-old LeRoy to serve as a Native-American papoose in the 1906 stage production of The Squaw Man. LeRoy attributed his early interest in vaudeville to "my mother's fascination with it" and to that of his cousins, Jesse L. Lasky and Blanche Lasky, vaudevillians during LeRoy's youth.

LeRoy's parents separated suddenly in 1905 for reasons that were not divulged to their son. They never reunited and his father Harry raised LeRoy as a single parent. His mother moved to Oakland, California with Percy Teeple, a travel agent and former journalist, who would later become LeRoy's stepfather after the death of Harry LeRoy in 1916. LeRoy visited his mother as a child, regarding her more as "a grandparent or a favorite aunt."

"A LeRoy-Armer family legend maintains that the newborn—delivered on the kitchen table and weighing only two-and-half pounds—was placed in a turkey roasting pan and put in a warm oven to improve his chances of survival. The doctor who advised this procedure cautioned LeRoy's parents: "Make sure the flame is real low, however."

The 1906 San Francisco earthquake and fire devastated the city when LeRoy was five-and-a-half years old. He was sleeping in his bed on the second floor when the quake struck in the early morning causing the house to collapse. Neither LeRoy nor his father suffered serious physical injury. His father's import-export store was completely destroyed. LeRoy retained vivid mental images of the city's devastation:

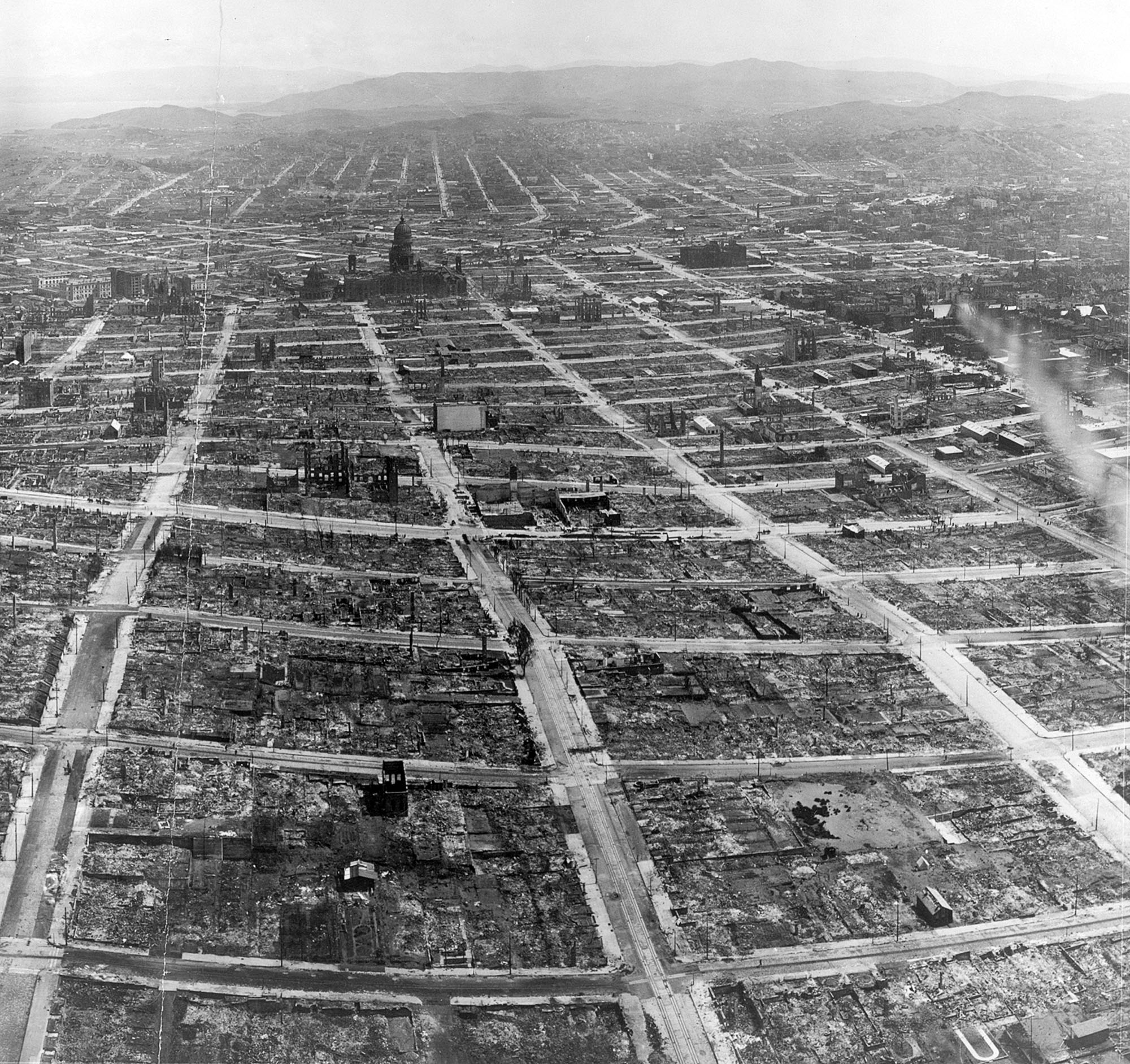
Aerial view of the aftermath to the 1906 San Francisco earthquake and fire

My memory is a kaleidoscope of pictures. I have always thought in visual terms and when I recall that morning of April 18, 1906, I see a mental album of tragic pictures...many years later in Quo Vadis, I shot the burning of Rome and I drew on my memories of the burning of San Francisco as a grim model.

Reduced to virtual penury, father and son lived as displaced persons at the military-run tent city on the Presidio for the next six months. The elder LeRoy obtained work as a salesman for the Heinz Pickle Company, but his business losses had left him "a beaten man." The young LeRoy emerged from the traumatic event with a sense of pride that he had survived the ordeal and to regard it as fortuitous: "The big thing in my life was the earthquake...it changed my life before I knew I even had one."

At the age of twelve, with few prospects to acquire a formal education and his father financially strained, LeRoy became a newsboy and earned his first money. His father supported him in this endeavor. LeRoy hawked newspapers at iconic locations, including Chinatown, the Barbary Coast red-light district and Fisherman's Wharf, where he became educated as to the realities of life in the city:

I saw life in raw on the streets of San Francisco. I met the cops and the whores and the reporters and the bartenders and the Chinese and the [commercial] fishermen and shopkeepers. I knew them all, knew how they thought and how they loved and how they hated. When it came time for me to make motion pictures, I made movies that were real, because I knew how real people behaved.

== Juvenile acts in vaudeville: 1914–1923 ==
Selling newspapers near the Alcazar Theatre, LeRoy was spotted by stage star Theodore Roberts. A personable and attractive youth at age fourteen, LeRoy was engaged for a bit part in a 1914 stage production of Barbara Frietchie. Gratified by "that lovely feeling—audience approval", he performed in productions with the Liberty Theater in Oakland, playing the lead juvenile roles in Tom Sawyer and Little Lord Fauntleroy.

=== Chaplin impersonator ===
As a 14-year-old, LeRoy carefully observed emerging screen star Charlie Chaplin at a number of film sets in the greater San Francisco area. From these studies, LeRoy devised a burlesque of the comedian, and perfected his imitation on the local amateur circuit. In 1915, he won a competition that hosted almost a thousand Chaplin imitators at the Pantages Theater. His outstanding performance earned him a slot as "The Singing Newsboy" in Sid Grauman's vaudeville show at the Panama–Pacific International Exposition titled "Chinatown by Night".

In 1916, his father died, leaving the 15-year-old LeRoy responsible for providing his own financial support.

=== LeRoy and Cooper: "Two Kids and a Piano": 1916–1919 ===
Now a show-business professional, LeRoy left his newsboy job. Pairing with the 16-year-old actor-pianist Clyde Cooper, they formed a vaudeville routine "LeRoy and Cooper: Two Kids and a Piano." The duo struggled to find engagements, and LeRoy recalled "we would have played toilets if they had offered us some money." Soon they were discovered by the premier vaudeville circuits – Pantages, Gus Sun and Orpheum – and provided with regular bookings on national tours. LeRoy relished the lifestyle of a vaudevillian, occasionally appearing in shows that featured iconic performers of the era, among them Sarah Bernhardt, Harry Houdini and Jack Benny. After three years, and now "a fairly well-established act" in theater listings, the duo amicably disbanded after an unexpected death in Cooper's family.

LeRoy joined George Choos's mostly female troupe in musical comedies, and Gus Edwards act billed "The Nine Country Kids" in 1922. LeRoy's enthusiasm for the stage gradually waned and he left the troupe in 1923.

== Early Hollywood career: technician and actor: 1919–1923 ==
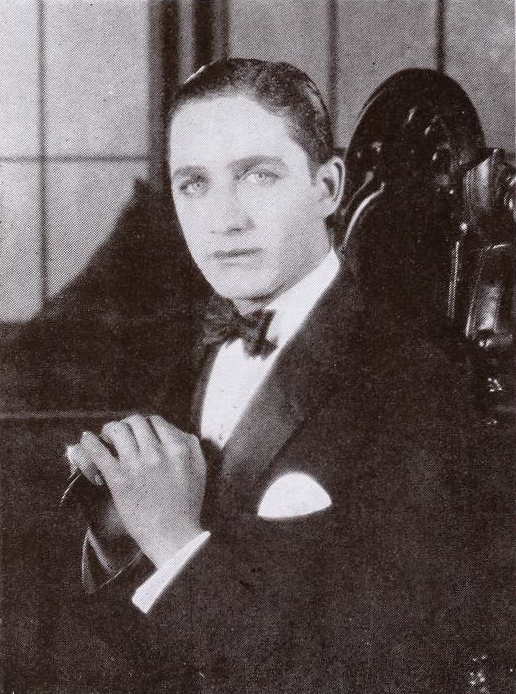
LeRoy in the early–mid 1920s

LeRoy accepted a bit role in a scene with former The Perils of Pauline (1914) star Pearl White filmed at Fort Lee, New Jersey. LeRoy was "thoroughly intrigued" by the filmmaking process, recalling: "I knew I was finished with vaudeville. I knew, just as positively that I wanted to get into the movie business."

In October 1919, LeRoy, just turned 19, approached his cousin Jesse L. Lasky, a former vaudevillian who was twenty years his senior. Lasky was a partner with rising movie moguls Samuel Goldwyn and Adolph Zukor at its New York headquarters at Famous Players–Lasky. Lasky furnished LeRoy with note to the employment department at their Hollywood studios. A week later LeRoy began working in the Wardrobe Unit folding costumes for the American Civil War picture Secret Service (1919), earning $12.50 a week.

According to film historian Kingley Canham, LeRoy's "enthusiasm, energy and push", in addition to a further appeal to Jesse Lasky, earned LeRoy promotion to lab technician in the film tinting unit.

LeRoy's next advancement was achieved through his own initiative. Discovering that director William DeMille wished to create an illusion of moonlight shimmering on a lake to produce a romantic effect, LeRoy devised a technique in the lab:

I had an idea. That night I stayed late in the lab...I got a big wooden box about twelve feet square and lined it with tar paper. Then I filled it with distilled water...I got a spotlight and carefully set it up so the light played upon the surface of the water...I took one of the studio's Pathé cameras, found a supply of raw film and shot some five-thousand feet of my pseudo-moonlight-on-the-water.

Despite LeRoy suffering a stern reprimand, DeMille was delighted with the effect and used the footage in the film. LeRoy was immediately promoted to assistant cameraman.

After six months behind the camera, LeRoy experienced a disastrous contretemps when he improperly adjusted the camera focus settings, ruining footage on several scenes on a DeMille production. LeRoy describes it as "a horrible mess" which led to his dismissal in 1921 as cameraman.

LeRoy was soon hired as an extra on Cecil B. DeMille's 1923 epic The Ten Commandments LeRoy credits Cecil B. DeMille, for inspiring him to become a director: "As the top director of the era, DeMille had been the magnet that had drawn me to his set as often as I could go." LeRoy also credits DeMille for teaching him the directing techniques required to make his own films.

LeRoy worked intermittently in small supporting roles in film during the early 1920s. The youthful and diminutive LeRoy (at 5 feet 7 inches [170 cm] and just over 115 pounds [52 kg]) was consistently cast in juvenile roles. appearing with film stars Wallace Reid, Betty Compson and Gloria Swanson (See Film Chronology table) He performed his last role in The Chorus Lady (1924) as "Duke".

=== Gag writer (comedy constructor) and Alfred E. Green, 1924–1926 ===
During the filming of The Ghost Breaker (1922), bit actor LeRoy suggested a number of humorous skits, which were incorporated into the picture by director Alfred E. Green. Green offered him a position as "gag man". LeRoy recalled:

I didn't have to think twice. That was what I wanted—a chance to be in on the creative aspect of movie-making. It wasn't directing, but it was getting closer. It was inventing, not interpreting...I abandoned my acting career with no regrets.

While working at First National Pictures, LeRoy wrote gags for comedienne Colleen Moore in several films, including Sally (1925), The Desert Flower (1925), We Moderns (1925) and Ella Cinders (1926). LeRoy served as acting advisor and confidant to Moore. In 1927, her husband John McCormick, studio head at First National in Hollywood, asked LeRoy to direct Moore in a version of Peg O' My Heart. When the project was cancelled, studio president Richard A. Rowland, with Moore advocating, authorized LeRoy to direct a comedy, No Place to Go, starring Mary Astor and Lloyd Hughes and launching LeRoy's filmmaking career at age twenty-seven.

== First National Pictures: transition to sound, 1927–1930 ==
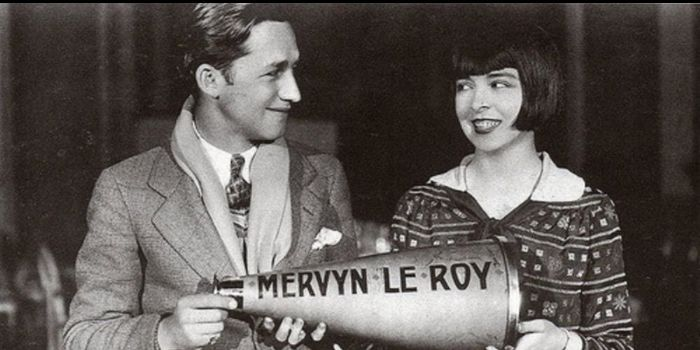
LeRoy on the set of Oh, Kay! (1928) alongside Colleen Moore

His success with No Place to Go (1927), was followed by "a string of comedies and jazz-baby dramas" that served as vehicles for actress Alice White and allowed LeRoy to hone his skills as director. His prolific output in the final years of the silent film era included the box-office successes Harold Teen with Arthur Lake and Oh, Kay! with Colleen Moore.

Warner Brothers acquired First National in 1925 as a subsidiary studio and producer Jack Warner became a mentor and in-law to LeRoy in subsequent years.

LeRoy eagerly anticipated his first sound picture assignment, Naughty Baby (1928):

My fifth picture, in 1928, was my first with sound. I had been watching the experiments with talkies with tremendous excitement...As a veteran of stage and vaudeville, I knew the value of the spoken and sung word. I understood dialogue, because I had been an actor...I couldn't wait until I had a change to direct a talking picture.

LeRoy's early directing efforts at First National were largely limited to comedies. His movies from this period include Gentleman's Fate (1931) with John Gilbert (filmed at M-G-M studios), Tonight or Never (1931), with Gloria Swanson, High Pressure, a proto-screwball comedy with William Powell and Evelyn Brent, and The Heart of New York (1932) with Joe Smith.

== Warner Brothers: 1930–1939 ==
LeRoy embarked on a period of enormous productivity and inventiveness at Warner Studios, creating "some the most polished and ambitious" films of the Thirties. His only rival at Warner's was fellow director Michael Curtiz. Film historian John Baxter observes:

Warners films were the most perfectly economical exercises in cinematic mechanics of which Hollywood was capable. There was no fat on them, either as art or entertainment...as a filmmaking tool, it functioned best in the hands of two great directors, Mervyn LeRoy and Michael Curtiz.

In the studio's competitive crucible produced by the Great Depression demanding profitable entertainment, LeRoy directed 36 pictures during the decade (Curtiz filmed an astounding 44 features during the same period). Baxter adds: "No genius could function without variation under such pressure." The social perspective of films favored at Warner Brothers was distinct from those of its chief rivals: Metro-Goldwyn-Mayer (M-G-M), uncontested for its "technical virtuosity" aimed to serve "middle-class tastes" and Paramount studios identified for its "sophisticated dialogue and baroque settings" that catered to European sensibilities. In contrast, Warner Brothers films carried themes appealing to the working classes. LeRoy biographer Kingsley Canham writes:

The topicality of Warner's material and its direct appeal to the working classes set it apart from other studios. What their films lacked in gloss in comparison to M-G-M or the sophistication of Paramount was more than adequately compensated for by their presentation of everyday material...the working classes could identify with people, the situations and surroundings...

LeRoy's output in the early Thirties was prodigious. The director attests to the rate of film production at the studios:

"If the poorer Curtiz films are disappointing, LeRoy's failures are impossible to watch. When his initial concept was faulty or failed through heavy-handed scripting he could be as banal as Henry King at his worst. It needed a firm central theme to sustain LeRoy, a solid anchor for his speculation, and it was when he had this that his films reached heights at least as lofty as those scaled by Curtiz." – Biographer John Baxter, from his Hollywood in the Thirties (1970)

...While the world was struggling out of the Depression, I turned out film after film after film. It was a period of tremendous activity for me —- and for Hollywood in general...I threw myself into my work...we had to keep working to stay up with the demand. The public was voracious in its appetite for movies...Neighborhood theaters had double features, and the bill usually changed twice a week. That means they were showing four new pictures a week, 208 a year, and that's only one theater.

LeRoy admits in retrospect that "I shot them so often and so fast that they tend to blend together in my memory."

LeRoy's social realism mocked corrupt politicians, bankers and the idle rich, while celebrating the Depression Era experiences of "hard-working chorus girls...taxi-drivers and bell-hops struggling to make ends meet in the brawl of New York...gloss and polish were considered useless affectation."

=== Gangster genre: Little Caesar, 1930 ===
"Mother of mercy—Is this the last of Rico?
—Iconic last words of fictional mob boss Caesar Enrico Bandello in "Little Caesar"

LeRoy first departed from his comedy-romance themed films with his drama Numbered Men (1930), a character study of convicts shot on location at San Quentin prison. The depiction of criminal elements had enjoyed popularity with Josef von Sternberg's silent classic Underworld (1927), a fantasy treatment of his lone Byronic gangster "Bull" Weed. The gangster film as a genre was not achieved until LeRoy's 1930 Little Caesar, starring Edward G. Robinson, the first time that "any real attempt was made by Hollywood to describe the brutal reality of the criminal world."

LeRoy's Little Caesar established the iconography of subsequent films on organized crime, emphasizing the hierarchy of family loyalties and the function of violence in advancing criminal careers. LeRoy's adroit cinematic handling of Robinson's Rico incrementally shifts initial audience response from revulsion at the character's homicidal acts to a "grudging admiration" that provides for a measure of sympathy when the gangster meets his sordid death in a back alley. LeRoy recalled the topicality of his subject in 1930: "Al Capone was a household word and the Saint Valentine's Day Massacre had happened only a year before."

LeRoy further demonstrated his talent for delivering fast-paced and competently executed social commentary and entertainment with Five Star Final (1931), an exposé of tabloid journalism, and Two Seconds (1932), a "vicious and disenchanted" cautionary tale of a death row inmate, each starring Robinson.

=== I Am a Fugitive from a Chain Gang (1932) ===
Warner Brothers' most explosive social critique of the 1930s appeared with LeRoy's I Am a Fugitive from a Chain Gang, dramatizing the harsh penal codes in Georgia and starring Paul Muni as the hunted fugitive James Allen.

Historian John Baxter observes that "no director has managed to close his film on so cold a note as LeRoy." Muni's escaped convict, falsely condemned to hard labor, is reduced to furtive prey: Asked by his estranged sweetheart "how do you get along, how do you live?" he hisses "I steal" and retreats into the night. Muni continued to work effectively with LeRoy in The World Changes (1933) with Aline MacMahon and in Hi, Nellie! (1934) with Glenda Farrell.

The versatile LeRoy portrayed both hard-boiled and clownish characters at Warner Brothers. His Hard to Handle (1933), James Cagney plays a fast-talking and remorselessly unscrupulous con-man, often to comic effect. His 1933 pictures Tugboat Annie (with LeRoy on loan to M-G-M), with Marie Dressler and Elmer, the Great, the final of three pictures that LeRoy made with comic Joe E. Brown, stand in contrast with the director's gangster melodramas.

LeRoy's socially themed narrative is evident in his Three on a Match (1932) which follows the fates of three young women: a stenographer, a showgirl and a socialite played by Bette Davis, Joan Blondell and Ann Dvorak, respectively. His adroit transitions and cross-cutting provide quick and effective insights into his characters' social rise and fall. The "pitiless mileau of grimy backstreets and cheap motels" serve as an implicit social critique without making this the theme of the picture.

=== The Gold Diggers of 1933 (1933) ===
The musical Gold Diggers of 1933 is one of the outstanding examples of the genre that Warner Brothers released in the thirties. While the "surreal, geometric, often erotically charged" dance stagings by choreographer Busby Berkeley dominate the picture, Warner's musicals were distinguished enough, according to historian John Baxter, "to be worth considering outside any discussion of Berkeley's dance direction. The Gold Diggers of 1933 certainly deserves such attention." Offering more than mere depression era escapism, the musical depicts the mass unemployment of veterans of World War I and alludes to the then-recent Bonus Army protests in Washington, D.C., that were suppressed by police and U.S. Army units. The movie closes with the "dark and pessimistic" number "Remember My Forgotten Man."

"From Little Caesar to Gypsy, Le Roy has converted his innate vulgarity into a personal style. As long as he is not mistaken for a serious artist, LeRoy can be delightfully entertaining."—Andrew Sarris (The American Cinema, 1968)

LeRoy's control of the comedic elements and his direction of a cast endowed with "hard-boiled" heroines Ruby Keeler, Joan Blondell, Aline MacMahon and Ginger Rogers, would provide stand-alone entertainment even if unencumbered by Berkeley's choreographed numbers. MacMahon, who plays the "ruthless" Trixie, was later cast as a murderess in the lead for LeRoy's dramatic Heat Lightning (1934), a picture which prefigures director Archie Mayo's The Petrified Forest (1936).

LeRoy followed with a Happiness Ahead, a musical-like comedy for Warners in 1934 starring Josephine Hutchinson, a society heiress who woos a window washer, played by Dick Powell.

=== 1935: Oil for the Lamps of China, Sweet Adeline, Page Miss Glory, and I Found Stella Parish ===
Oil for the Lamps of China, an adaptation of the Alice Tisdale Hobart novel, is an examination of an American oil company in China, centering on its paternalistic and humiliating treatment of an ambitious company man, played by Pat O'Brien. Josephine Hutchinson portrays his long-suffering wife. LeRoy effectively employed cinematic techniques of montage, structural parallels in settings, chiaroscuro lighting and musical leitmotifs to develop atmosphere and convey O'Brien's struggle, ending in his vindication.

LeRoy returned to light comedy and romance in 1935 with a film adaptation of stage production, the 1929 Jerome Kern and Oscar Hammerstein II play, starring Irene Dunne, followed by a Marion Davies vehicle Page Miss Glory, (filmed for Hearst's Cosmopolitan Pictures), and I Found Stella Parish,, with Kay Francis in a sentimental, "tour-de-force" performance.

=== Anthony Adverse (1936) ===
Based on the popular twelve-hundred page historical romance by Hervey Allen, Warner's Anthony Adverse (1936) was LeRoy's most prestigious undertaking to date. Only two-thirds of the vast and unwieldy picaresque tale, set during the Napoleonic era, is depicted onscreen (a sequel was planned but abandoned). The sheer scale of the project remains impressive, and LeRoy's ability to handle a film with high production values that possessed a "Metro-like glossiness" elevated him to becoming a protective executive producer at Metro-Goldwyn-Mayer.

The "lively performances" from a large cast, which included Fredric March, Olivia de Havilland, Claude Rains, Anita Louise and Gale Sondergaard, as well as LeRoy's "technical excellence," led to five Academy Award nominations.

LeRoy reported in his 1974 memoir that "by the time 1936 arrived, I was slowing my pace somewhat. Gone were the assembly-line tactics, the grinding-them-out methods of a few years before...I was working slower, trying to achieve more beauty on film, looking for cinematic perfection."

== Producer-Director at Warner Brothers: 1936–1938 ==
In 1936, Warners began tasking LeRoy with both directing and producing assignments. LeRoy served as producer-director on Three Men on a Horse (1936), a "madcap" comedy starring Frank McHugh and a screenplay co-written by Groucho Marx. This was followed in 1937 with The King and the Chorus Girl, starring French actor Fernand Gravet . Both films costarred Joan Blondell.

LeRoy also produced director James Whale's The Great Garrick (1937), a historical comedy with Brian Aherne who plays the renowned English actor.

=== They Won't Forget (1937) ===
"LeRoy's Thirties reputation [as a director] rests today on two films: They Won't Forget (1937), and Edward G. Robinson vehicle Little Caesar (1931)" – Film historian John Baxter

LeRoy's penultimate film for Warners was They Won't Forget (1937), a harsh indictment of lynch law based on the Ward Greene novel, Death in the Deep South (1936). According to critic Kingsley Canham, LeRoy's handling of tracking and low-angle shots, overhead composition, close-ups and dissolves possess a "visual power" that "retains its impact for modern audiences." LeRoy's unmitigated condemnation of lynching rejects misanthropy and adopts a tone of "righteous anger", in which there "is no forgiveness" for the instigators of mob law.

LeRoy was poised to move to M-G-M as head of production in 1938, with the fulsome support of the studio's Louis B. Mayer where "[LeRoy] would establish himself as a major force in Forties cinema." Before departing Warners, LeRoy directed and produced his final film, Fools for Scandal (1938), the studio's second – and failed attempt – to launch the American film career of French actor Fernand Gravet. Comedienne Carole Lombard co-starred.

== Interlude as producer: M-G-M: 1938–1939 ==
LeRoy arrived at M-G-M fully expecting to finish his career as the studio's chief production executive. His first assignments were modest:

Dramatic School (1938) directed by Robert B. Sinclair: A romantic drama starring Luise Rainer and Paulette Goddard and LeRoy's first picture at M-G-M. Biographer John Baxter attributes Rainer's "coherent, moving and truthful" performance to producer LeRoy and "a fitting to [the filmmakers] rich Thirties career."

Stand Up and Fight (1938), directed by W. S. Van Dyke: A Wallace Beery vehicle, with costars Robert Taylor and Florence Rice. The screenplay was co-written by crime fiction writer James M. Cain, and Jane Murfin, who wrote the adaptation of Booth Tarkington's novel the Katharine Hepburn vehicle Alice Adams (1935).

At the Circus (1938) directed by Edward Buzzell: A Marx Brothers comedy.

LeRoy's last picture as M-G-M's production executive was an adaptation of L. Frank Baum's children's book The Wizard of Oz.

=== The Wizard of Oz (1939): Magnum opus production ===
LeRoy had long desired to adapt the Frank Baum books to film and reminisced that "the dream remained merely a dream until I found myself at M-G-M and Louis B. Mayer asked me what I wanted to make." "The Wizard of Oz," I said.
He didn't look pained or upset or anything. "Okay," he said. "Do it."

In 1938, LeRoy proposed a film version of The Wonderful Wizard of Oz (1900). Louis B. Mayer purchased the rights to the property from Samuel Goldwyn for $50,000. Mayer limited LeRoy's role to producer and ultimately Victor Fleming was enlisted as credited director. LeRoy recalled the scope of the project:

The preparations were enormous. Nothing like it had ever been done before...[art directors] Cedric Gibbons [and] William A. Horning built a model of the set that was one-fourth life size...it took months to finish that alone, and some of the statistics boggle the mind...when the full set was built it covered 25 acres of the studio backlot...we had 65 different sets in the picture, and each of them was concocted out of whole cloth and hard work.

LeRoy added that "it took six months to prepare the picture, six months to shoot it, and then a lengthy post-production schedule for editing and scoring. Altogether, The Wizard of Oz was many months in the making..."

Though LeRoy was earning $3,000 a week ($600,000 per year), after completing The Wizard of Oz, he requested a release from his contract to return to directing, and Mayer complied.

...I quickly became disenchanted with my new job [as producer]...I found myself chafing at the executive's desk. It didn't take long to realize that the fun of the movie business was in the actual directing...About a year after getting to [M-G-M] I went to Mayer and said I wanted out.

LeRoy accepted a cut in salary to $4,000 a week as a director at M-G-M and "never again functioned only as a producer."

== Director at M-G-M: 1940–1949 ==
The onset of war in Europe in 1939 created anxiety in the Hollywood film industry as the overseas movie market contracted and currency restrictions mounted in Great Britain. Hollywood studios implemented salary reductions and limits on film content were imposed, particularly at M-G-M. Film historians Charles Higham and Joel Greenberg describe these developments persisting "almost to the end of the decade":

At Metro, the idea was to concentrate on nice people involved in heartbreak, finding their happiness at last in each others arms, and all in settings of an idealized and antiseptic beauty: an England full of sunshine and chintz and doves, an America full of white fences and rambler roses around the door. Hagiographies of inventors and reformers glowed with optimistic charm...

Critic Andrew Sarris disparages the "sentimental piety and conformist cant" that characterized M-G-M studios, as well as Warner Brothers in Hollywood's Golden Age

LeRoy limited himself to directing features at M-G-M for the next 9 years, delivering 11 pictures. The quality of his output during this period is generally viewed as a decline creatively compared to his early work at Warner Brothers during the Thirties.

He resumed directorial duties with an adaptation of Robert E. Sherwood's romantic play Waterloo Bridge (1930).

=== Waterloo Bridge (1940) ===
Metro-Goldwyn-Mayer purchased the rights to Waterloo Bridge from Universal Studios, which had produced an adaptation filmed in 1931 by James Whale and starring Mae Clarke as the fallen woman, Myra.

LeRoy's Waterloo Bridge (1940), served as a vehicle to capitalize upon the meteoric rise of Vivien Leigh, heroine of David O. Selznick's epic Gone with the Wind (1939). In a period when foreign markets were in jeopardy, profitable films were at a premium.

A silent film era technician and director in his early Hollywood career, LeRoy utilized silent film methods to film a key nightclub love scene with Leigh and costar Robert Taylor. LeRoy describes his epiphany:

No dialogue!...No dialogue at all!...I realized at that moment what all silent directors had always known...in great emotional moments, there are no words. A look, a gesture, a touch can convey much more meaning than spoken sentences [and] that's the way we played the scene...

LeRoy directed Robert Taylor, Norma Shearer and Conrad Veidt in the 1940 Escape, the first of a number of anti-Nazi features suppressed by Hitler and which ultimately led to the banning of all M-G-M pictures in Germany.

=== The Greer Garson pictures ===
LeRoy completed four features with English actress Greer Garson, an enormously profitable property cultivated by M-G-M to appeal to their British markets during WWII.

Blossoms in the Dust (1941): The screenplay by Anita Loos portrays the struggle by social reformer Edna Gladney to redeem children stigmatized by illegitimacy. Termed "highly romanticized" and "shamelessly sentimental" by film historian Kingley Canham, LeRoy defended the picture as virtuous and socially significant:

Blossoms in the Dust began my association with Greer Garson...the picture made an immediate and profound contribution to the world we live in. Between it and Fugitive, I think I have contributed toward making this a better country.

The pairing of Garson with Walter Pidgeon proved particularly appealing to their fans. They would appear together in a number of pictures, including LeRoy's 1943 biopic of Madame Curie.

As LeRoy's first color film, Blossoms in the Dust demonstrates an aesthetically pleasing and an adroit handling of the new Technicolor technology.

Random Harvest (1942): LeRoy and producer Sydney Franklin paired Garson with fellow Briton Ronald Colman in a romance that dramatizes clinical amnesia suffered by a WWI combat veteran. Garson's genteel and largely desexualized screen image – "M-G-M's First Lady of Saintly Virtue" – favored by Louis B. Mayer, is countered by LeRoy's less inhibited Garson as the "impulsive Scottish lass" Paula.

LeRoy's leisurely narrative pace, the lavishness of the settings, the fulsome musical score and the balanced editing demonstrate his embrace of M-G-M production values and distinguishing the stylish Random Harvest from his work at Warner Brothers.

Madame Curie (1943): Apropos LeRoy's "lavish and lengthy biography" portraying the Nobel prize-winning scientist Marie Curie, critics Higham and Greenberg make these observations:

With money rolling in and attendance at all time highs, studios in the Forties could afford to indulge in 'prestige productions' as never before. Lives of the great and famous proved, as always, tempting material: authors, saints, politicians, scientists, inventors and tycoons received solid if none too accurate tributes...

LeRoy and producer Sydney Franklin made an effort to make the "highbrow" subject of the film – the heroic discovery of radium isotopes – engaging to the public, resorting to romanticizing and simplifying the topic.

Madame Curie was one of nine pictures in which Garson was cast with leading man Pidgeon. Married to Buddy Fogelson, Garson earned the title "the daytime Mrs. Pidgeon" on M-G-M sets.

Desire Me (1946): LeRoy attempted to reshoot an uncompleted George Cukor project starring Garson and Robert Mitchum, Desire Me, but abandoned the film, disparaging the "rotten script, a script that made absolutely no sense.". Neither Cukor nor LeRoy appeared in the credits.

Strange Lady in Town (1955): LeRoy's first film after returning to Warner Brothers studios as a director-producer. Garson, passed over by M-G-M to star as opera diva Marjorie Lawrence in Interrupted Melody (1955), signed with Warners to make Strange Lady in Town, a western set in Santa Fe, New Mexico and endowed to Garson's satisfaction "with horses and sunsets." Dana Andrews co-stars.

=== Wartime propaganda: 1944–1945 ===
In the final years of World War II, LeRoy directed propaganda films dramatizing the American war efforts at home and overseas.

Thirty Seconds Over Tokyo (1944) recounts the 1942 U.S. bombing mission over Tokyo by sixteen B-25s, coordinated by Lieutenant-Colonel James H. Doolittle (played by Spencer Tracy). LeRoy employs flashbacks in an effort to present the personal lives of the airmen and their spouses, including an emotionally wrought scene in which the wounded Lieutenant Ted W. Lawson (played by Van Johnson) has his leg amputated.

Conceived as a morale-builder for the homefront, Thirty Seconds Over Tokyo, with a script written by Dalton Trumbo "lacks the scope and organization" and compares unfavorably to director John Cromwell's 1943 Since You Went Away according to critic Kingsley Canham. The rescue sequences of the downed American flyers' by Chinese guerrillas was designed "to foster closer relations 'between the American People and their courageous Chinese allies'" and includes a scene with Chinese children at a mission hospital honoring the airmen with a rendition of Katherine Lee Bates' patriotic anthem America the Beautiful.

The House I Live In (1945), Documentary short: LeRoy reports in his memoir Take One that Frank Sinatra approached him in 1945 with the idea of making a short movie version based on the song by Abel Meeropol The House I Live In. LeRoy thought it a worthy project and "a good thing to do during the wartime years." The script was written by Albert Maltz and produced by Frank Ross and LeRoy, who also directed.

The House I Live In garnered LeRoy a special Oscar for his role as producer in the short film, the only Academy Award he would ever receive. In appreciation for LeRoy's contributions to The House I Live In, Frank Sinatra presented him with a medallion bearing the Jewish Star of David on one side and a Saint Christopher medal on the obverse.

== Postwar Hollywood in the 1940s ==
The Hollywood film industry reached its zenith in productivity, profitability, and popularity at the end of World War II. The studios collectively enjoyed their most lucrative year in 1946, with gross earnings reaching $1.75 billion. In the closing years of the decade, organized labor won wage increases of 25% through protracted strikes. Overseas markets imposed substantial taxes on Hollywood films. Studios reacted by cutting expenses on film production and ordering mass layoffs. Historians Higham and Greenberg describe the qualitative impact on Hollywood films:

Sudden economy waves threw thousands out of work. Budgets were cut, crowd scenes minimized, epics involving large and expensive sets abandoned in favor of stories emphasizing 'story' and 'realism' rather than lavish production values...efficiency was the keynote everywhere...

The formerly "glossy" productions were often replaced with lower budget, black-and-white films, which employed smaller casts and used indoor stages, rather than expensive on-location sites.

Compounding the financial crisis was the Red Scare, launched against the purported Communist influence in Hollywood. The leading studio executives expelled many talented figures in collaboration with House Un-American Activities Committee (HUAC). Accused of introducing Communist content into productions, the departure of Leftist screenwriters, directors and actors removed a creative element that had for years contributed to the success of Hollywood pictures. These purgings were considered, in some financial circles and the anti-Communist establishment, a necessary corrective to labor militancy in the industry: "To some observers, [the blacklist] represented a long overdue housecleaning process; to others it meant the beginning of an era of fear, betrayal and witch-hunting hysteria."

LeRoy reflected on the Red Scare in his 1974 memoir:

I am strongly pro-American and I had come to recognize that some Communist propaganda was creeping into movies. I felt it was a good thing to root that out, but I deplored that excesses that went into the rooting-out process...there were writers who were supposedly on the Hollywood blacklist that I trusted...I had used Dalton Trumbo, one of the Hollywood Ten, as writer on Thirty Seconds Over Tokyo in 1945. He turned out a great American story for me, and it had not the slightest hint of anything subversive in it....[The Red Scare] was a sorry period for human relations. Out of fear and self-preservation, men and women informed on their friends, even on their husbands or wives.

By the close of the Forties, the drain of artistic talent, the emerging television industry, and litigation that led to the weakening of studio monopolies destabilized the film industry, initiating a decline in the heretofore unlimited power and profitability of the Hollywood movie empire.

=== Comedies, melodramas and a literary remake: 1946–1950 ===
Without Reservations (1946): LeRoy's post-war pictures began with a Claudette Colbert vehicle (reminiscent of her role in It Happened One Night (1934)), with John Wayne as "Rusty" in an uncharacteristic romantic-comedic role. Colbert, as "Kit," utters the memorable and mildly impious phrase, "Thanks, God. I'll take it from here." This is also the title of the book, by Jane Allen and Mae Livingston, on which the movie is based.

Homecoming (1948): Like director William Wyler's 1946 The Best Years of Our Lives, LeRoy's Homecoming dramatizes an ex-servicemen's readjustment to civilian life. The film is based on Sidney Kingsley novel, The Homecoming of Ulysses (1944), which draws on Homer's ancient Greek epic. Clark Gable plays Ulysses "Lee" Johnson, a recently discharged war surgeon whose self-complacency is shaken by his personal and professional combat experiences. That softens his misanthropy and eases the nexus with his estranged wife, played by Anne Baxter. In the third of her film pairings with Gable, Lana Turner plays an "uncharacteristically unglamorous" Lt. Jane "Snapshot" McCall.

Little Women: One of several film adaptations of Louisa May Alcott's Civil War era literary classic. The M-G-M Technicolor production offers "a picture postcard prettiness" in lieu of credible performances by June Allyson, Janet Leigh, Elizabeth Taylor and Margaret O'Brien.

Any Number Can Play (1949): Based on an Edward Harris Heth novel, the film describes the personal and professional crisis of a casino owner of high rectitude Clark Gable who also plays for high stakes, with his family relations in the balance. LeRoy was perplexed that the compelling screenplay by Richard Brooks and excellent performances delivered by Gable and Alexis Smith did not register at the box-office. LeRoy reflected on the picture: "I don't know what went wrong. You start out with what you think is a good script and you get a good cast...[but] you end up with a film that is less than you expect. Something happened or, more likely, something didn't happen – the chemistry didn't work and the emotions didn't explode. Whatever the reason, Any Number Can Play was a disappointment to me."

East Side, West Side (1949): A "dramatic social melodrama", in which the East Side, West Side refers to the class differences that define and divide the "superlative cast" in this M-G-M "high-gloss" production. Barbara Stanwyck, plays the betrayed spouse, supported by co-stars James Mason, Ava Gardner and Van Heflin.

== Quo Vadis (1951): Biblical spectacle ==
Metro-Goldwyn-Mayer's Quo Vadis (1950) dramatizes an episode in the apocrypha Acts of Peter. The Latin title translates as "Where are you going?" and was adapted from a novel by Nobel Laureate author Henryk Sienkiewicz.

LeRoy's recognized that the Hollywood film industry would be best served by "accommodating" the emerging popularity of television, envisioning a division of mass entertainment function: TV would do small scale, low-budget productions dealing with "intimate things," while the motion picture studios would provide "the bigger, broader type of film." LeRoy's turn to "gigantic spectacle" coincided with the early onset of Hollywood's relative decline, as described by film historians Charles Higham and Joel Greenberg:

At the close of the Forties, something vital seemed to be ebbing away ever more swiftly from the films of Hollywood, a process accelerating in the early Fifties, reaching a climax with the introduction of CinemaScope...the Forties may now be seen as the apotheosis of the U.S. feature film, its last great show of confidence and skill before it succumbed artistically to the paralyzing effects of bigger and bigger screens and the collapse of the star system.

Cecil B. DeMille, director of the silent film The Ten Commandments, counseled LeRoy on the worthiness of cinematic biblical epics:
"I'll tell you Mervyn, the Bible has been a best-seller for centuries. Why let two thousand years of publicity go to waste?"

Logistically, Quo Vadis presented an "enormity." Filmed at the Cinecittà Studios in Rome, the production required the mobilization of tens of thousands of extras, more than nine months of shooting and an immense financial risk for M-G-M.

The huge investment in time and money paid off: Second only to Gone with the Wind (1939) in gross earnings, Quo Vadis garnered eight Academy Award nominations in 1952.

LeRoy welcomed the services of an American Jesuit priest assigned to act as a technical adviser on the production. The director was granted a personal audience with Pope Pius XII and, upon LeRoy's request, the Pope blessed the script of Quo Vadis.

=== Musicals and romantic comedies: 1952–1954 ===
In the aftermath of his successful epic Quo Vadis, LeRoy turned away from spectacles to lighter productions:

Lovely to Look At (1952): A re-make of the 1935 Astaire-Rogers musical scored by Jerome Kern, Roberta, directed by William A. Seiter. Vincente Minnelli organized the extravagant fashion show finale, with costumes by Adrian

Million Dollar Mermaid (1952): An aquatic-themed biopic loosely based on the life of Australian swimmer Annette Kellerman, portrayed by Esther Williams and aided by LeRoy's "competent direction." Busby Berkeley stages his lavishly produced underwater Oyster ballet.

Latin Lovers (1953): A romantic musical comedy starring Lana Turner and Ricardo Montalbán.

Rose Marie (1954): An adaptation of a stage operetta by Otto Harbach and previously filmed by M-G-M in silent and sound versions, the LeRoy adaptation starred Ann Blyth and Howard Keel. his final effort with M-G-M before he returned to Warner Brothers.

LeRoy attributes his disaffection from M-G-M to a professional incompatibility with Dore Schary, who had recently replaced Louis B. Mayer as head of production: "[Schary] and I never really did see eye-to-eye on most things...since he was then running the studio, it didn't seem to make much sense for me to stick around."

== Return to Warner Brothers: 1955–1959 ==
After completing his last production featuring Greer Garson in Strange Lady in Town (1955), LeRoy turned largely to adapting Broadway successes, serving as producer and director and often enlisting casts from the original stage productions.

=== Mister Roberts (1955) ===
Warners tasked LeRoy and Joshua Logan with completing Mister Roberts after the original director John Ford was hospitalized with a gallbladder disorder and removed from the production. Ford's departure and substitution proved to be fortuitous. Henry Fonda, who played the lead character, was a screen star in several Ford pictures, as well as the lead actor in the highly acclaimed, 1948 Broadway production of Mister Roberts. Fonda had been at odds with Ford's film adaptation: the two engaged in a demoralizing contretemps that threatened to undermine the project.

Mister Roberts enjoyed immense popular and financial film success for Warners and earned supporting actor Jack Lemmon his first Oscar.

== Return to director-producer ==
LeRoy assumed the dual role of director-producer in the late Fifties and Sixties, during the declining period of the Hollywood Golden Age. He primarily worked at Warner Studios, but also 20th Century Fox, Columbia and Universal. Critic Kingsley Canham offers the following appraisal of LeRoy's work in this period:

LeRoy's work in the later half of the Fifties and Sixties has been largely confined to adaptations of stage successes, interspersed with the odd drama such as The FBI Story (1959), The Devil at 4 O'Clock (1961) and Moment to Moment (1966). Many of the former displayed an unhappy tendency toward excessive length or they padded out a basically funny situation beyond its endurance (e.g. A Majority of One [1961] and Wake Me When it's Over [1960]), tending to make one feel that LeRoy was better off in the Thirties when he had to work in the more restricted confines of the old Hollywood system when it was at its peak...whereas [the] Fifties signaled the death knell of the Old Hollywood, leaving directors like LeRoy to struggle with unsuitable material, assigned to them by virtue of their past reputations.

Despite these developments, LeRoy remained a profitable asset in the film industry.

The Bad Seed (1956): The film is based on a story by William March about a disturbed eleven-year-old girl whose murderous behavior is credited to her genetic heritage: she is the granddaughter of a notorious serial killer. Maxwell Anderson's 1954 stage production enjoyed success and LeRoy imported most of the cast for his film adaptation, including child actor Patty McCormick. The Motion Picture Production Code required that the child murderess perish for her crimes, and LeRoy dispatches her with a lightning bolt. LeRoy recounts his struggle with censors:

I couldn't budge the Johnston Office people...In those days, long before the rating system, there was no halfway about it...You either got a seal of approval or you didn't, and Jack Warner wasn't about to release the film without that seal. So we had to change the ending. John Lee Mahin dreamed up the idea of having the child killed by a bolt of lightning. The Johnson Office gave us their blessing when we showed them the revised script.

The highly profitable Bad Seed garnered Academy Award nominations for several of the principal cast and cinematographer Harold Rosson.

Toward the Unknown (1956): A sympathetic dramatization of a former Korean War POW, played by William Holden, who struggles to recover from post-traumatic stress disorder (PTSD) and return to service as a test pilot in the U.S. Air Force.

No Time for Sergeants (1958): Novelist Mac Hyman's hillbilly protagonist Will Stockdale gained popularity in comic book form and was adapted to the stage by Ira Levin. Andy Griffith played the lead and Nick Adams his sidekick in LeRoy's film adaptation.

Home Before Dark (1958): Based on a story and screenplay by Robert and Eileen Bassing, LeRoy examines the struggle of a former mental patient (Jean Simmons) to normalize her relationships with her husband (Dan O'Herlihy), who she suspects of having an affair with her half-sister (Rhonda Fleming).

The FBI Story (1959): A hagiographic review of federal law enforcement figure Chip Hardesty, vetted by LeRoy's close personal friend and FBI director J. Edgar Hoover, and starring James Stewart. For his services in directing and producing The FBI Story, the agency honored LeRoy with its Distinguished Service Award.

Wake Me When It's Over (1960), 20th Century Fox: A comedy-of-errors, starring Ernie Kovacs and Dick Shawn, involving the appropriation of post-WWII army surplus to build a resort on a remote Japanese island occupied by US troops.

The Devil at 4 O'Clock (1961), Columbia Pictures: A priest (Spencer Tracy) and a convict (Frank Sinatra) join forces to rescue children from a leper colony when a volcano eruption threatens their Polynesian island.

A Majority of One (1961): Warner Brothers: An adaptation of the successful Leonard Spigelgass play directed by Dore Schary. Stage actors Gertrude Berg and Cedric Hardwicke were replaced by producer Jack L. Warner with film stars Rosalind Russell and Alec Guinness as the romantic leads, and the story set in Japan.

Gypsy (1962), Warner Brothers: LeRoy returned to musicals with a portrayal of the young Gypsy Rose Lee in her early career as a burlesque stripper, played by Natalie Wood, with Rosalind Russell as Lee's domineering stage mother.

Moment to Moment (1965), Universal: LeRoy's last credited directorial effort, Moment to Moment starring Jean Seberg and Honor Blackman.

Following Moment to Moment, disputes with Universal production head Edward Muhl over studio-proposed screenplays led to LeRoy's return to Warner Brothers under Jack Warner's auspices. There LeRoy embarked on several projects, including pre-production for an adaptation of James Thurber's The 13 Clocks, a tale that LeRoy believed "had the makings of another Wizard of Oz. When Warner Brothers was purchased by The Kinney Company, executives canceled the project and LeRoy quit the studio

=== The Green Berets (1968): Uncredited adviser ===
LeRoy served for over five months as an uncredited adviser on the 1968 The Green Berets, co-directed by Ray Kellogg and John Wayne and based on Robin Moore's 1965 collection of short stories.

The studio producing The Green Berets, Seven Arts, after recently acquiring Warner Brothers, were concerned that Wayne's dual role as actor-director was beyond his abilities. LeRoy describes his enlistment in the project and the extent of his contribution:

Eliot Hyman [head of Warner Bros.-Seven Arts operations] told me that I had a free hand with the picture. I could do anything I wanted – even close it down if I felt it should be shut down...When I got to Fort Benning, Duke [Wayne] and I had a long talk and straightened out the question as to how I could help him. Then I took over and assisted Duke with the directing whenever he thought he needed me...

LeRoy added that he "was on the picture for five and a half months...I didn't do it for nothing, of course, but I wouldn't let them put my name on it, as I didn't think that would be fair to Duke." LeRoy retired from Warner Bros.-Seven Arts shortly after completing The Green Berets, representing his directorial swan song.

LeRoy received an honorary Oscar in 1946 for The House I Live In, "for tolerance short subject," and the Irving G. Thalberg Memorial Award in 1976.

A total of eight movies Mervyn LeRoy directed or co-directed were nominated for Best Picture at the Oscars, one of the highest numbers among all directors.

On February 8, 1960, he received a star on the Hollywood Walk of Fame at 1560 Vine Street, for his contributions to the motion pictures industry.

== Casting discoveries ==
LeRoy has been credited with launching or advancing the careers of numerous actors in Hollywood films when he served as director or producer at Warner Brothers and Metro-Goldwyn-Mayer studios. Biographer Kingsley Canham makes these observations:

LeRoy's undoubted talent as a producer and a star-maker, and his knack for recognizing potential [in actors], made him an outstanding success, both critically and financially... ...in the competitive and highly-charged atmosphere [in the old Hollywood system], LeRoy spotted stars like Lana Turner, Jane Wyman, Loretta Young, Audrey Hepburn and the Dead End Kids...[and] was able to promote them in scripts that suited their personalities.

Loretta Young: LeRoy's discovery of Loretta Young (then Gretchen Young) presents at least two distinct origin tales: Ronald L. Bowers in Film Review [April 1969]) reported that LeRoy had directly solicited the 13-year-old Young in 1926 to play a juvenile part in Naughty but Nice (1927), a Colleen Moore vehicle for which Young received $80.00.

LeRoy, in his memoir Take One, offers a variation of this origin story: In 1930, LeRoy reports that he recruited Young through the auspices of her mother. LeRoy needed a leading lady to play opposite Grant Withers in Too Young to Marry (1931). Young's older half-sister (stage name Sally Blane) was engaged on another film, and her mother offered the younger daughter, Gretchen, as a substitute. LeRoy agreed, but changed her name to Loretta.

Clark Gable: Warner Brothers studio cast Edward G. Robinson in the role of gangster Rico Bandello in Little Caesar (1930), but LeRoy was anxious to cast the part of racketeer Joe Masara. Rejecting Warners offer of Douglas Fairbanks, Jr., LeRoy spotted Gable in a touring production of The Last Mile at the Majestic Theatre in Los Angeles in the role of Killer Mears, and arranged a screen test with the stage actor. Pleased with the results, LeRoy championed Gable to producers Darryl Zanuck and Jack L. Warner for the part: they emphatically rejected the prospect, objecting to his relatively large ears. LeRoy declined the opportunity to sign Gable in a personal contract, which he would later regret. Despite this, Gable credited LeRoy for elevating his prospects in Hollywood: "He always gave me credit for discovering him." As LeRoy shared in an interview with John Gillett in 1970: "I always tried to help young players- Clark Gable would have been in Little Caesar, but the front office thought his ears were too big."

Jane Wyman: LeRoy claims Wyman as one of his discoveries, though she had already been signed by Jack L. Warner at the age of 16, though not yet cast in a production. She was selected by LeRoy to play a bit part in his 1933 Elmer, the Great. LeRoy recalled his first encounter with the actress:

...I found [Wyman] on the [Warners] lot. Although Jack Warner had signed her, he hadn't used her in anything. I saw her walking around the lot one day in a yellow polo coat—I decided she'd be right for Elmer and put her in it. She did a beautiful job, and her career was launched.

Lana Turner: At age fifteen, the then Judy Turner was auditioned by LeRoy in his effort to cast an actor to play Mary Clay in the 1937 social drama They Won't Forget. According to LeRoy's recollections, Turner was introduced to him as a prospect by Warner Brothers casting director Solly Baianno. LeRoy changed her name to Lana (pronounced LAW-nuh) Turner and personally groomed Turner for stardom. LeRoy would also direct Turner in his 1948 Homecoming, co-starring Clark Gable.

Audrey Hepburn: During casting for M-G-M's 1950 biblical epic Quo Vadis LeRoy sought an unknown actress for the role of Lygia, the young Christian loved by centurion Marcus Vinicius, played by (Robert Taylor). Audrey Hepburn was among hundreds of aspirants who were tested for the part. LeRoy reports in his memoir that he personally championed Hepburn as a "sensational" pick for the role, but the studio declined.

Robert Mitchum: LeRoy singled out 27-year-old Mitchum among the extras during the shooting of Thirty Seconds Over Tokyo (1944), casting him to play one of the crew of the "Ruptured Duck", a B-25 bomber. This was Mitchum's first role on screen, but M-G-M declined to sign him, despite LeRoy's urging. Mitchum starred with Greer Garson in Desire Me (1947), for which LeRoy's directorial contribution went uncredited.

Sophia Loren: According to LeRoy, Sophia Loren credits him with launching her film career. LeRoy had noticed the 16-year-old Loren among the extras assembled for a crowd scene in Quo Vadis, placing her in a prominent position where his cameras would "pick up this tall, Italian dark-eyed beauty." Years later, Loren personally thanked him: "My Mother and I needed the money and you hired us. None of [my film career] would have happened except for you."

== Personal life ==
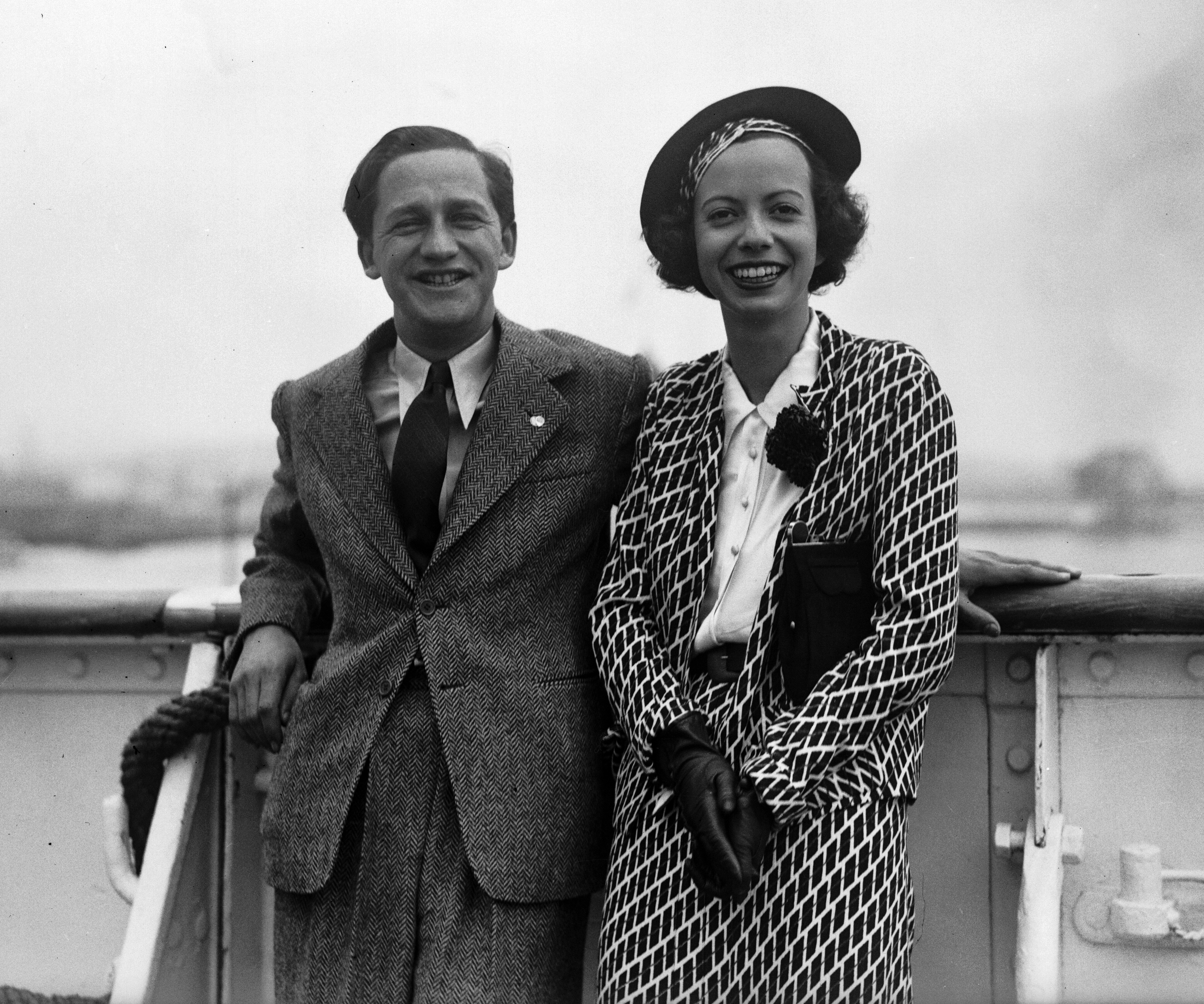
LeRoy with his second wife Doris Warner in 1934

LeRoy married three times and had many relationships with Hollywood actresses. He was first married to Edna Murphy in 1927, which ended in divorce in 1932. During their separation, LeRoy dated Ginger Rogers, but they ended the relationship and stayed lifelong friends. In 1934, he married Doris Warner, the daughter of Warner Bros. founder, Harry Warner. The couple had one son, Warner LeRoy and one daughter, Linda LeRoy Janklow, who is married to Morton L. Janklow. His son, Warner LeRoy, became a restaurateur. The marriage ended in divorce in 1942. In 1946, he married Kathryn "Kitty" Prest Rend, who had been previously married to Sidney M. Spiegel (the co-founder of Essaness Theatres and grandson of Joseph Spiegel); and to restaurateur Ernie Byfield. They remained married until his death. LeRoy also sold his Bel Air, Los Angeles, home to Johnny Carson.

=== Other interests ===
A fan of thoroughbred horse racing, Mervyn LeRoy was a founding member of the Hollywood Turf Club, operator of the Hollywood Park Racetrack and a member of the track's board of directors from 1941 until his death in 1987. In partnership with father-in-law, Harry Warner, he operated a racing stable, W-L Ranch Co., during the 1940s/50s.

== Death ==
After being bedridden for six months, LeRoy died of heart issues complicated by Alzheimer's disease in Beverly Hills, California on September 13, 1987, at the age of 86. He was interred in the Forest Lawn Memorial Park Cemetery in Glendale, California. He was remembered by the New York Times as "the versatile movie director of such explosive dramas as ''Little Caesar'' and ''I Am a Fugitive From a Chain Gang'' and such lush romances as ''Waterloo Bridge'' and ''Random Harvest."

== Film chronology ==
=== Silent era ===
==== Actor: 1920–1924 ====
Year	Title	Director	Role
1920	Double Speed	Sam Wood	Uncredited juvenile role
1922	The Ghost Breaker	Alfred E. Green	A Ghost
1923	Little Johnny Jones	Arthur Rosson, Johnny Hines	George Nelson
1923	Going Up	Lloyd Ingraham	Bell Boy
1923	The Call of the Canyon	Victor Fleming	Jack Rawlins
1924	Broadway After Dark	Monta Bell	Carl Fisher
1924	The Chorus Lady	Ralph Ince	Duke

==== Writer (comedies): 1924–1926 ====
Year	Title	Director	Notes
1924	In Hollywood with Potash and Perlmutter	Alfred E. Green	As a gag writer
1925	Sally	Alfred E. Green	
1925	The Desert Flower	Irving Cummings	
1925	The Pace That Thrills	John Francis Dillon	Also served as assistant director (uncredited)
1925	We Moderns	Ralph Ince	
1926	Irene	Alfred E. Green	
1926	Ella Cinders	Alfred E. Green	
1926	It Must Be Love	Alfred E. Green	
1926	Twinkletoes	Charles Brabin	
1926	Orchids and Ermine	Alfred Santell	

==== Director ====
Year	Title	Studio/Distributor	Screenplay	Photography	Leading Cast	Notes
1927	No Place to Go	Productions/First National Pictures	Adeliade Helbron	George Folsey	Mary Astor, Lloyd Hughes	Also released as Her Primitive Mate
1928	Flying Romeos	E.M. Asher/First National Pictures	John McDermott	Dev Jennings	Charlie Murray, George Sydney	
1928	Harold Teen	Alan Dwan/First National Pictures	Thomas J. Geraghty	Ernest Haller	Arthur Lake, Mary Brian	Based on Carl Ed comic strip
1928	Oh, Kay!	E.M. Asher/First National Pictures	Carey Wilson	Sid Hickox	Colleen Moore, Alan Hale Sr.	
1928	Naughty Baby	Richard A. Rowland/First National Pictures	Thomas J. Geraghty	Ernest Haller	Alice White, John Mulhall	

=== Sound era ===
Year	Title	Studio/Distributor	Screenplay	Photography	Leading Cast	Notes
1929	Hot Stuff	Wid Gunning/First National Pictures	Louis Stevens	Sid Hickox	Alice White, Jack Mulhall	Released in silent and partial sound versions
1929	Broadway Babies	Robert North/First National Pictures	Monte M. Katterjohn	Sol Polito	Alice White, Charles Delaney	Released in silent and sound versions.
1929	Little Johnny Jones	First National Pictures	Adelaide Heilbron, Edward Buzzell	Faxon M. Dean	Edward Buzzell, Alice Day	Released in silent and sound versions. Adapted from a George M. Cohan musical
1930	Playing Around	Robert North/First National Pictures	Adele Comandini, Frances Nordstrom	Sol Polito	Alice White, Chester Morris	
1930	Showgirl in Hollywood	Robert North/First National Pictures	Harvey Thew, Jimmy Starr	Sol Polito	Alice White, Jack Mulhall	
1930	Numbered Men	First National Pictures	Al Cohn, Henry McCarty	Sol Polito	Conrad Nagel, Bernice Claire	
1930	Top Speed	First National Pictures	Humphrey Pearson, Henry McCarty	Sid Hickox	Joe E. Brown, Bernice Claire	
1930	Little Caesar	Hal B. Wallis/First National Pictures	Francis Faragoh	Tony Gaudio	Edward G. Robinson, Sidney Blackmer	
1931	Gentleman's Fate	M-G-M, M-G-M	Leonard Praskins	Merritt B. Gerstad	John Gilbert, Leila Hyams	
1931	Too Young to Marry	Warner Bros./Warner Bros.	Francis Faragoh	Sid Hickox	Loretta Young, Grant Withers	Based on play Broken Dishes
1931	Broadminded	First National Pictures	Burt Kalmar, Harry Ruby	Sid Hickox	Joe E. Brown, Ona Munson	
1931	Five Star Final	Robert North/First National Pictures	Robert Lord	Sol Polito	Edward G. Robinson, Marian Marsh	
1931	Local Boy Makes Good	First National Pictures	Robert Lord	Sol Polito	Joe E. Brown, Dorothy Lee	
1931	Tonight or Never	United Artists	Ernest Vajda	Gregg Toland	Gloria Swanson, Ferdinand Gottschalk	
1932	High Pressure	Warner Bros.	Joseph Jackson	Robert Kurrle	Joe E. Brown, Ona Munson	
1932	Heart of New York	Warner Bros.	Arthur Caesar, Houston Branch	James Van Trees	Joe Smith, Charles Dale	
1932	Two Seconds	First National Pictures	Harvey Thew	Sol Polito	Edward G. Robinson, Preston Foster	
1932	Big City Blues	Warner Bros.	Ward Morehouse, Lillie Hayward	James Van Trees	Joan Blondell, Eric Linden	
1932	Three on a Match	Sam Bischoff/ First National Pictures	Lucien Hubbard	Sol Polito	Joan Blondell, Ann Dvorak	
1932	I Am a Fugitive from a Chain Gang	Hal B. Wallis/Warner Bros.	Howard J. Green, Brown Holmes	Sol Polito	Paul Muni, Glenda Farrell	
1933	Hard to Handle	Robert Lord/Warner Bros., Vitaphone	Wilson Mizner, Robert Lord	Barney McGill	James Cagney, Mary Brian	
1933	Tugboat Annie	Metro-Goldwyn-Mayer	Zelda Sears, Eve Greene	Gregg Toland	Marie Dressler, Wallace Beery	
1933	Elmer, the Great	First National Pictures	Tom Geraghty	Arthur L. Todd	Joe E. Brown, Patricia Ellis	Remake of Fast Company (1929)
1933	Gold Diggers of 1933	Warner Bros.	Erwin Gelsey, James Seymour	Sol Polito	Warren William, Joan Blondell	Dance director: Busby Berkeley
1933	The World Changes	Hal B. Wallis/Warner Bros.	Edward Chodorov	Tony Gaudio	Paul Muni, Mary Astor	
1934	Heat Lightning	Sam Bischoff/Warner Bros.	Brown Holmes, Warren Duff	Sid Hickox	Aline MacMahon, Ann Dvorak	
1934	Hi, Nellie!	Robert Presnell/Warner Bros.	Ahem Finkle, Sydney Sutherland	Sol Polito	Paul Muni, Glenda Farrell	
1934	Happiness Ahead	Sam Bischoff/Warner Bros.	Ahem Finkle, Sydney Sutherland	Tony Gaudio	Dick Powell, Josephine Hutchinson	
1935	Oil for the Lamps of China	Robert Lord (w/Cosmopolitan/First National Pictures)	Laird Doyle	Tony Gaudio	Pat O'Brien, Josephine Hutchinson	
1935	Page Miss Glory	Robert Lord (w/Cosmopolitan/Warner Bros.	Robert Lord, Delmer Daves	George Folsey Jr.	Marion Davies, Pat O'Brien	
1935	I Found Stella Parish	Harry Joe Brown/First National Pictures	Casey Robinson	Sid Hickox	Kay Francis, Ian Hunter	
1935	Sweet Adeline	Edward Chodorov/Warner Bros.	Erwin S. Gelsey	Sol Polito	Irene Dunne, Donald Woods	
1936	Anthony Adverse	Jack L. Warner, Henry Blanke/ Warner Bros.	Sheridan Gibney	Tony Gaudio	Fredric March, Claude Rains	
1936	Three Men on a Horse	Frank Bischoff/ First National Pictures	Laird Doyle	Sol Polito	Frank McHugh, Joan Blondell	
1937	The King and the Chorus Girl	Frank Bischoff/ First National Pictures	Norma Krasner, Groucho Marx	Tony Gaudio	Fernand Gravet, Joan Blondell	
1937	They Won't Forget	Mervyn LeRoy/ First National Pictures	Robert Rossen, Aben Kandel	Arthur Edeson	Claude Rains, Gloria Dickson	
1938	Fools for Scandal	Mervyn LeRoy/ Warner Bros.	Herbert Fields, Joseph Fields	Ted Tetzlaff	Carole Lombard, Fernand Gravet	
1940	Waterloo Bridge	Sidney Franklin/ Metro-Goldwyn-Mayer	S. N. Behrman, George Froeschel	Joseph Ruttenberg	Vivien Leigh, Robert Taylor	
1940	Escape	Mervyn LeRoy/ Metro-Goldwyn-Mayer	Arch Oboler, Marguerite Roberts	Robert Planck	Norma Shearer, Robert Taylor	Reissued as When the Door Opened
1941	Blossoms in the Dust	Mervyn LeRoy//, Irving Asher /Metro-Goldwyn-Mayer	Anita Loos	Karl Freund, W. Howard Greene	Greer Garson, Walter Pidgeon	LeRoy's first color film
1941	Unholy Partners	Samuel Marx/ Metro-Goldwyn-Mayer	Earl Baldwin, Lesser Samuels	George Barnes	Edward G. Robinson, Edward Arnold	
1941	Johnny Eager	John W. Considine, Jr. /Metro-Goldwyn-Mayer	John Lee Mahin, James Edward Grant	Harold Rosson	Robert Taylor, Lana Turner	
1942	Random Harvest	Sidney Franklin/Metro-Goldwyn-Mayer	Claudine West, George Froeschel	Joseph Ruttenberg	Greer Garson, Ronald Colman	
1944	Madame Curie	Sidney Franklin /Metro-Goldwyn-Mayer	Paul Osborn, Hans Rameau (Paul H. Rameau)	Joseph Ruttenberg	Greer Garson, Walter Pidgeon	
1945	Thirty Seconds Over Tokyo	Sam Zimbalist/ Metro-Goldwyn-Mayer	Dalton Trumbo	Harold Rosson	Van Johnson, Spencer Tracy	
1946	Without Reservations	Jesse L. Lasky /RKO Pictures	Andrew Solt	Milton H. Krasner	Claudette Colbert, John Wayne	
1948	Homecoming	Sidney Franklin /Metro-Goldwyn-Mayer	Paul Osborn	Harold Rosson	Clark Gable, Lana Turner	
1949	Little Women	Mervyn LeRoy/ Metro-Goldwyn-Mayer	Andrew Solt, Sarah Y. Mason	Joseph Ruttenberg	June Allyson, Peter Lawford	
1949	Any Number Can Play	Arthur Freed/ Metro-Goldwyn-Mayer	Richard Brooks	Harold Rosson	Clark Gable, Alexis Smith	
1950	East Side, West Side	Voldemar Vetluguin/ Metro-Goldwyn-Mayer	Isobel Lennart	Charles Rosher	Barbara Stanwyck, James Mason	
1950	Quo Vadis?	Sam Zimbalist Metro-Goldwyn-Mayer	John Lee Mahin, S. N. Behrman	Robert Surtees	Robert Taylor, Deborah Kerr	
1952	Lovely to Look At	Jack Cummings/ Metro-Goldwyn-Mayer	George Wells, Harry Robin	George Folsey	Kathryn Grayson, Red Skelton	
1952	Million Dollar Mermaid	Arthur Hornblow, Jr. /Metro-Goldwyn-Mayer	Everett Freeman	George Folsey	Esther Williams, Walter Pidgeon	
1952	Latin Lovers	Joe Pasternak /Metro-Goldwyn-Mayer	Isobel Lennart	Joseph Ruttenberg	Lana Turner, Ricardo Montalbán	
1954	Rose Marie	Mervyn LeRoy /Metro-Goldwyn-Mayer	Ronald Millar, George Froeschel	Paul C. Vogel	Ann Blyth, Howard Keel	
1955	Strange Lady in Town	Mervyn LeRoy /Warner Bros.	Frank Butler	Harold Rosson	Greer Garson, Dana Andrews	
1955	Mister Roberts	Leland Hayward (Orange Productions)/Warner Bros.	Frank Nugent, Joshua Logan	Winton C. Hoch	Henry Fonda, James Cagney	with John Ford
1956	The Bad Seed	Mervyn LeRoy /Warner Bros.	John Lee Mahin	Harold Rosson	Nancy Kelly, Patty McCormack	
1956	Toward the Unknown	Mervyn LeRoy (Toluca Productions) /Warner Bros.	Beirne Lay Jr.	Harold Rosson	William Holden	G.B. tltle: Brink of Hell
1958	No Time for Sergeants	Mervyn LeRoy /Warner Bros.	John Lee Mahin	Harold Rosson	Andy Griffith, Myron McCormick	
1958	Home Before Dark	Mervyn LeRoy /Warner Bros.	Eileen Bassing, Robert Bassing	Joseph F. Biroc	Jean Simmons, Dan O'Herlihy	
1959	The FBI Story	Mervyn LeRoy /Warner Bros.	Richard L. Breen	Joseph F. Biroc	James Stewart, Vera Miles	
1960	Wake Me When Its Over	Mervyn LeRoy /Warner Bros.	Richard L. Breen	Leon Shamroy	Dick Shawn, Ernie Kovacs	
1961	The Devil at 4 O'Clock	Mervyn LeRoy /Columbia Pictures	Liam O'Brien	Joseph F. Biroc	Spencer Tracy, Frank Sinatra	
1961	A Majority of One	Mervyn LeRoy /Warner Bros.	Leonard Spigelgass	Harry Stradling	Alec Guinness, Rosalind Russell	
1962	Gypsy	Mervyn LeRoy /Warner Bros.	Leonard Spigelgass	Harry Stradling	Rosalind Russell, Natalie Wood	
1963	Mary, Mary	Mervyn LeRoy /Warner Bros.	Richard L. Breen	Harry Stradling	Debbie Reynolds, Barry Nelson	
1965	Moment to Moment	Mervyn LeRoy /Warner Bros.	John Lee Mahin	Harry Stradling	Jean Seberg, Honor Blackman	

==== Producer ====
Year	Title	Studio/Distributor	Director	Photography	Leading Cast
1937	The Great Garrick	Warner Bros.	James Whale	Ernest Haller	Brian Aherne, Olivia de Havilland
1938	Stand Up and Fight	Metro-Goldwyn-Mayer	W. S. Van Dyke	Leonard Smith	Wallace Beery, Robert Taylor
1938	Dramatic School	Metro-Goldwyn-Mayer	Robert B. Sinclair	William H. Daniels	Luise Rainer, Paulette Goddard
1938	At the Circus	Metro-Goldwyn-Mayer	Edward Buzzell	Leonard Smith	Groucho Marx, Harpo Marx
1939	The Wizard of Oz	Metro-Goldwyn-Mayer	Victor Fleming	Harold Rosson	Judy Garland, Frank Morgan

==== Uncredited contributions ====
Year	Title	Studio/Distributor	Director	Photography	Leading Cast	Notes
1932	The Dark Horse	Sam Bischoff/First National Pictures	Alfred E. Green	Sol Polito	Warren William, Bette Davis	Unspecified contributions
1933	42nd Street	Warner Bros.	Lloyd Bacon	Sol Polito	Warner Baxter, Ruby Keeler	Assisted in one of the musical numbers
1947	Desire Me	Arthur Hornblow Jr./Metro-Goldwyn-Mayer	George Cukor	Joseph Ruttenberg	Greer Garson, Robert Mitchum	LeRoy made extensive reshoots for the film
1949	The Great Sinner	Gottfried Reinhardt/Metro-Goldwyn-Mayer	Robert Siodmak	George Folsey	Gregory Peck, Ava Gardner	Re-shot and re-edited portions of the film
1968	The Green Berets	Michael Wayne/Batjac Productions	John Wayne, Ray Kellogg	Winton C. Hoch	John Wayne, Jim Hutton	Assisted Wayne during 5 months of production
