= The Crystal Cup =

1927 film

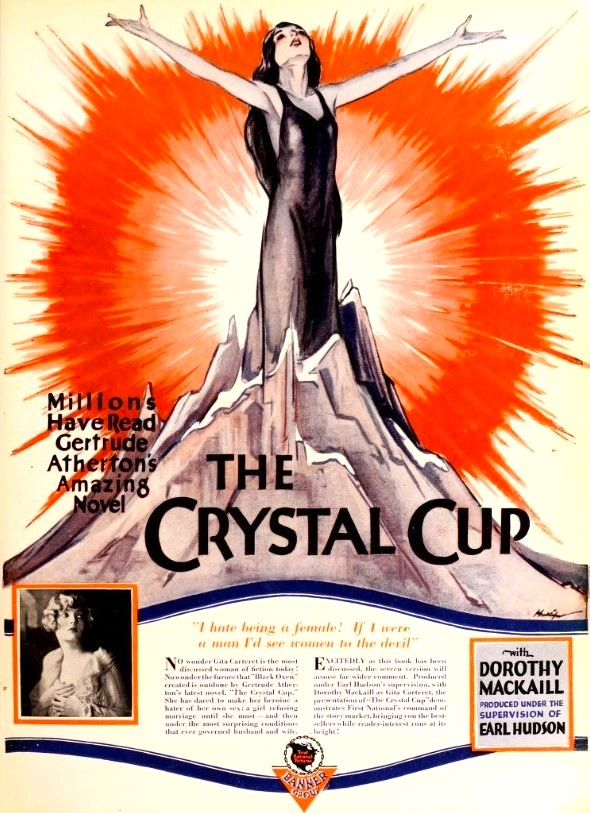
- 1926 advertisement
- Directed by: John Francis Dillon
- Screenplay by: Gerald Duffy; Mort Blumenstock
- Based on: The Crystal Cup by Gertrude Atherton
- Produced by: Henry Hobart
- Starring: Dorothy Mackaill; Rockliffe Fellowes; Jack Mulhall; Clarissa Selwynne
- Cinematography: James Van Trees
- Production company: Henry Hobart Productions
- Distributed by: First National Pictures
- Release date: October 16, 1927
- Running time: 70 minutes
- Country: United States
- Language: Silent (English intertitles)

The Crystal Cup is a 1927 American silent drama film directed by John Francis Dillon and written by Gerald Duffy and Mort Blumenstock. It is based on the 1925 novel The Crystal Cup by Gertrude Atherton.

The film stars Dorothy Mackaill, Rockliffe Fellowes, Jack Mulhall, Clarissa Selwynne, Jane Winton, and Edythe Chapman. The film was released on October 16, 1927, by First National Pictures. There are no known existing copies of the film, and is considered a lost film.

== Synopsis ==
Gita Carteret, a wealthy young heiress, develops an intense dislike for men. The reason for her aversion to the opposite sex is due to her father's cruel treatment of her mother when Gita was a child, described in the intertitles as a "beast of a father".

After being adopted by her grandmother, she is subjected to some unwelcome attentions of a fresh young gentleman during a dancing party. He tells her that if she doesn't like his kisses she can wash them off, which she promptly does by jumping into the ocean in her undergarments.

So she starts dressing in mens clothes, wears short hair, smokes, drinks, abandons feminine mannerisms, and generally appears to hold her own. Fulfilling a promise to her dying grandmother, Gita attends a fashionable ball at the Pleydens, but instead of feminine attire, she goes dressed in a tuxedo.

At the ball, she meets John Blake and Dr. Geoffrey Pelham, who are both interested in her. After being warned by Mrs. Pleyden that her behavior is becoming the subject of gossip, and to keep from her home constant male callers, Gita convinces Blake to marry her in name only, which he reluctantly agrees to. Blake is given to understand by Gita, before the wedding, that they are to occupy separate apartments in his house.

When Blake becomes busy working on a novel, Gita develops an intimate friendship with Dr. Pelham, but she is also frightened by the attraction. Blake eventually becomes frustrated with the platonic relationship he has with Gita, and when he enters her room one night, Gita is terrified and shoots him.

As Blake lies dying, he realizes that Dr. Pelham and Gita belong together, so he asks him to marry her, and Gita goes back to wearing feminine clothes.

== Cast ==
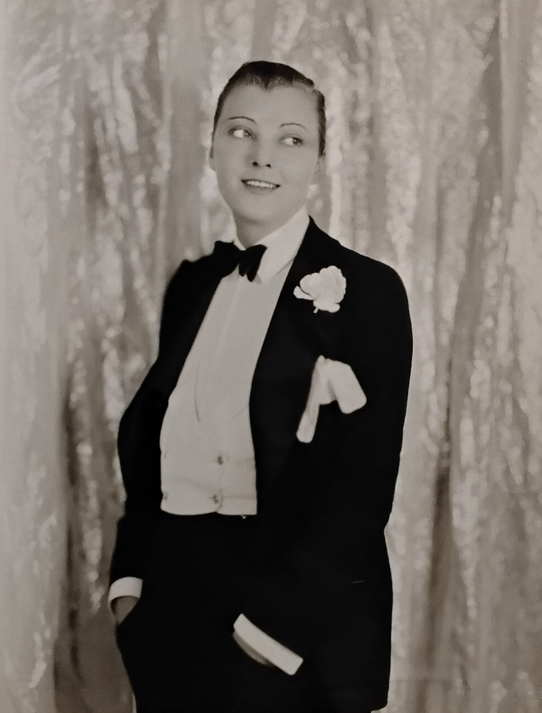
Publicity photo of Dorothy Mackaill dressed in tuxedo as seen in film

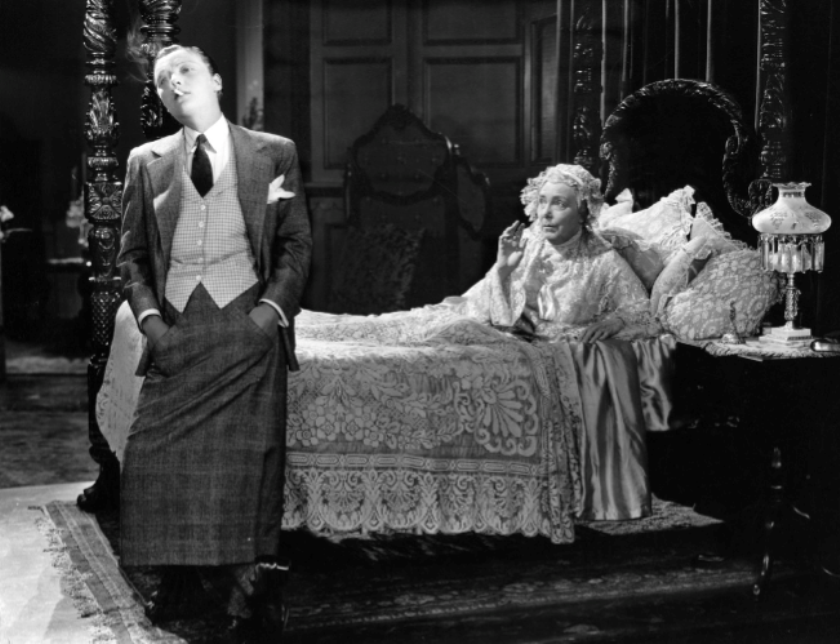
Film still with Gita smoking a cigarette and her grandmother in bed

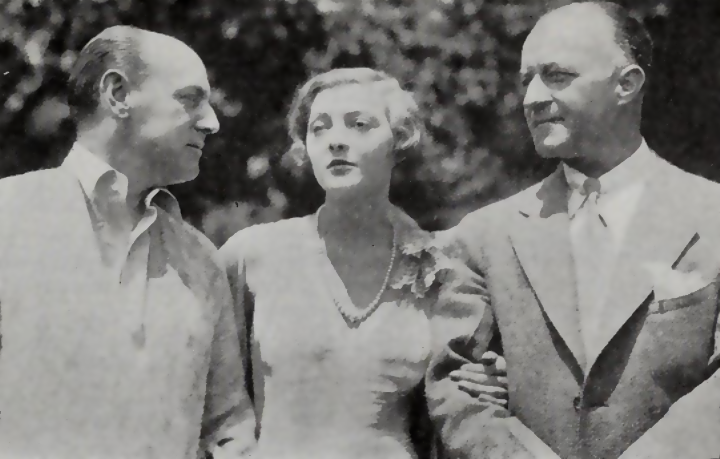
From left to right: Henry Hobart (producer), Dorothy Mackaill and John Francis Dillon (director)

- Dorothy Mackaill as Gita Carteret
- Rockliffe Fellowes as John Blake
- Jack Mulhall as Geoffrey Pelham
- Clarissa Selwynne as Mrs. Pleyden
- Jane Winton as Polly Pleyden
- Edythe Chapman as Mrs. Carteret
- Yvonne Pelletier as Gita Carteret as a child

== Background ==
According to The Washington Post, "for her unusual role in this highly dramatic picture, Miss Mackaill, as an unusually athletic young woman, is called upon to play golf, perform in a gymnasium and do some expert swimming. It was necessary for her to study the game of golf as well as practice the gymnasium stunts, but the swimming came easily, inasmuch as she has had a swimming pool in her Beverly Hills home for some time and lists the aquatic diversion as her favorite sport."

Henry Hobart, the producer, said he kept the plot simple because he believes that "many worthwhile film stories are appreciably lessened in dramatic value because of an overly complicated plot, the essential drama is weakened because of the necessity of wasting the greater part of the space available in a picture of ordinary length on irrelevant explanations." He went on to say that "too many characters in a story make for the same difficulty in that valuable space is wasted in introducing them and keeping them from being confused in the mind of the audience." He concluded that the plot is "simplicity itself, and narrows down to a study of a few personalities, each one carefully worked out and built up by well selected incidents and scenes which build up the definite nature of each personality."

== Release and preservation status ==
The film was released in October 1927, and according to the National Film Preservation Board, it is listed as a lost film.

== Reception ==
Film critic Mordaunt Hall wrote "shallow though it is, the pictorial transcription of Atherton's novel possesses sufficient originality to make it a fairly entertaining subject; Mackaill is quite charming as Gita, but the more serious phases of the picture seem a little beyond her; Mulhall is satisfactory as Geoffrey Pleyden and Fellowes is capital as Blake."

Roy Chartier of Billboard Magazine was not that impressed with the film, writing "it is nothing to get particularly enthusiastic about; the story, although it develops a number of interesting situations, is of the kind that gives you a good idea of the end before it gets thru the first reel; while the director has made a faithful attempt to follow the Atherton story, his efforts lack originality and skill in execution, in a word, it is just another movie, it gets by, but that's all."

The Moving Picture World opined that while the film is based on Atherton's novel, who digs deep under the skins of her characters, the scenarist of this movie has ignored these dissections, taking only the surface highlights and produced a thin and not particularly interesting picture of a bachelor girl whose masculinity is chiefly demonstrated by her ability to light matches on her thumb nail; Mackaill looks boyish and charming in her tailored skirts and boyish haircut, but here is preeminently a case of the clothes making the man, for she gives no character study and is entirely unconvincing; merely an actress playing a part under her director's orders.

Critic Edwin Schallert disliked the film, stating "for the sort of story that it is, the film is consistently told, I don't know just what particular purpose it serves, but I presume there are some people who will like it. Mackaill works very zealously to convince in her portrayal, but it is all up-hill. The mannish garb worn by her in a majority of the scenes adds little to the pictorial impressiveness, nor her personal attractions. Its rather freakish story may appeal to some extent."

== See also ==
- 1927 in film
- List of lost silent films (1925–1929)
- List of LGBTQ-related films of the 1920s
