= Dorothy Seastrom =

American actress (1903–1930)

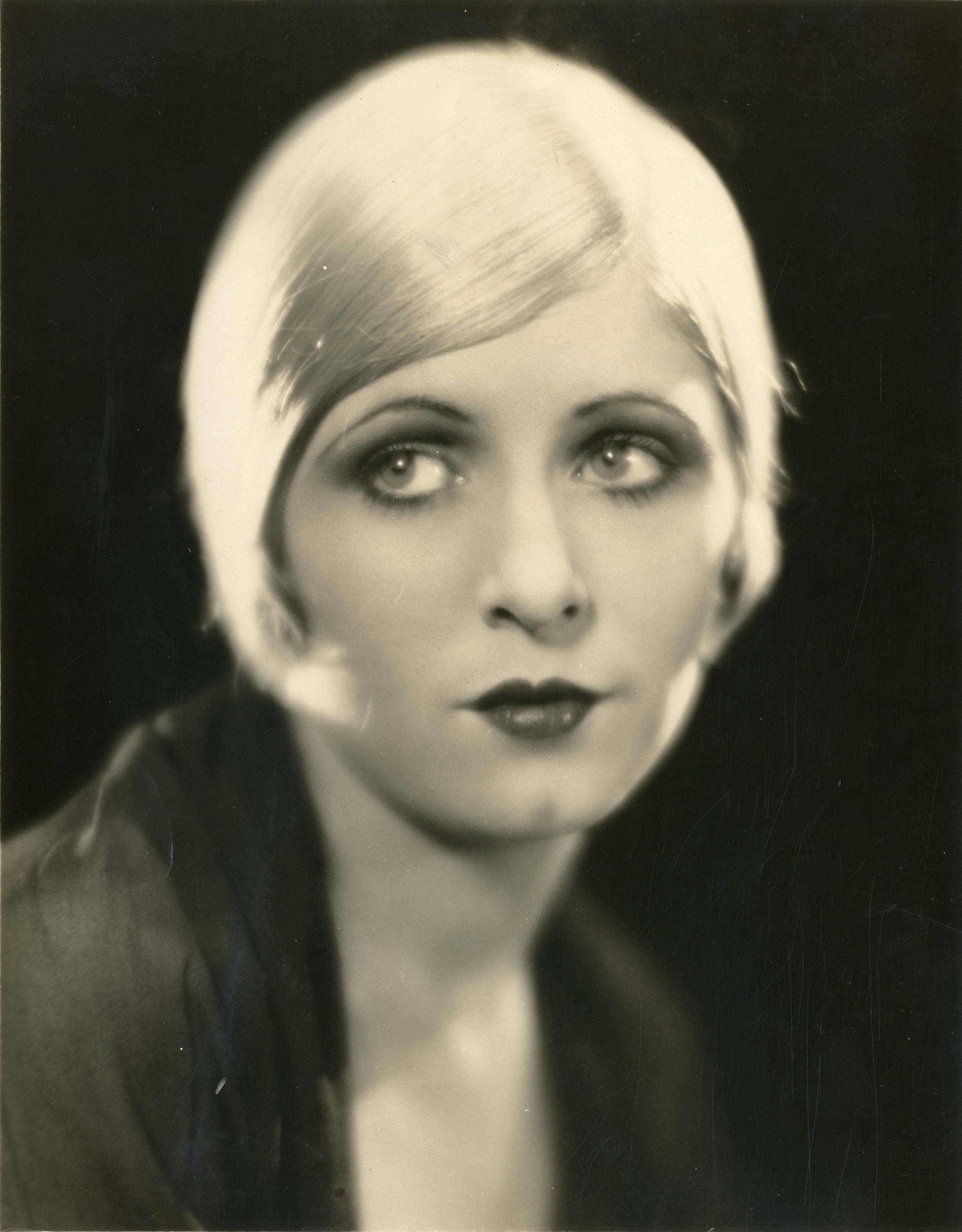
- Seastrom in 1925
- Born: Dorothy Susan Seastrunk Corby; March 17, 1903; Dallas, Texas, U.S.
- Died: January 31, 1930 (aged 26); Dallas, Texas, U.S.
- Resting place: Grove Hill Memorial Park, Dallas, Texas
- Occupation: Actress
- Years active: 1923–1926
- Spouse: Francis Corby

Dorothy Seastrom (born Dorothy Susan Seastrunk Corby; March 17, 1903 – January 31, 1930) was an American silent film actress.

== Early life and career ==
Born in Texas, Seastrom got into acting after winning a beauty competition. Her family later relocated to Chicago. Her film career began in 1923 with the role of Eleanor Harmon in The Call of the Canyon, directed by Victor Fleming. Later she acted under the direction of Cecil B. Demille. She signed a five-year contract with First National Pictures in September 1925. Seastrom was called the "Candy Kid" at First National due to her taffy colored hair.

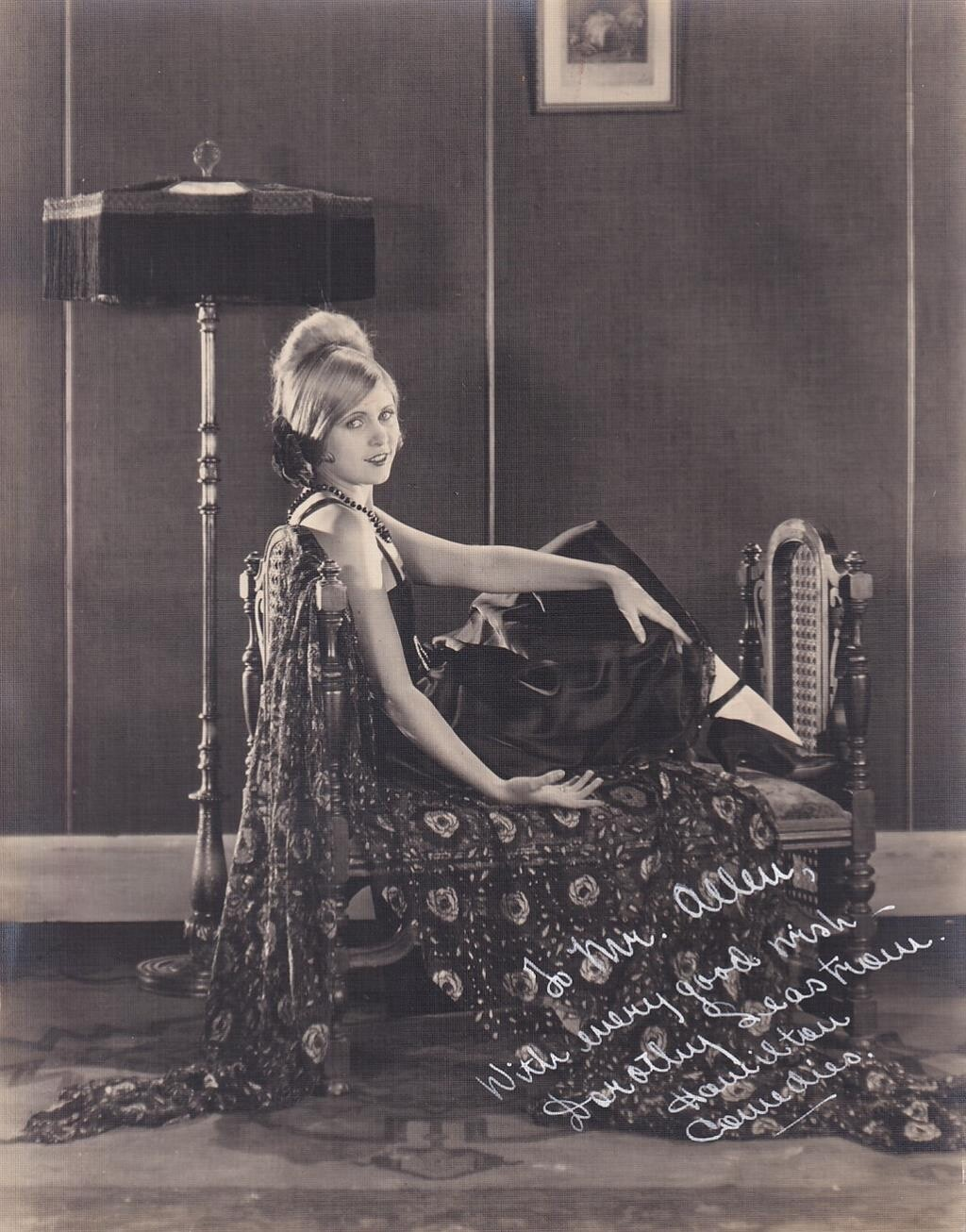
Seastrom signed with Hamilton Comedies

She appeared in The Perfect Flapper with Colleen Moore and Classified with Corinne Griffith. Seastrom barely avoided a potentially disfiguring accident during the filming of We Moderns (1925). A shower of sparks from a short-circuited light fell upon her hair and shoulders at the United Studios. Seastrom escaped injury when assistant director James Dunne grabbed a tablecloth from a prop table and covered the actress's head. Electricians shut off the power to a light which hung from the fly system above the scene. Seastrom made a full recovery from the burns she sustained. She returned to complete the film.

In 1926, Seastrom missed six months from acting while she had to rest in a sanitarium and "build up a physique weakened by work and worry".

== Death ==
After being in a sanatorium, in 1926, Seastrom returned and appeared in her final film It Must Be Love. (The widower Corby wed a young script girl turned actress named Ellen Hansen in 1934; they divorced in 1944.) Seastrom died of tuberculosis in Dallas on January 31, 1930, aged 26. She was buried in Grove Hill Memorial Park in Dallas, Texas.

== Filmography ==
Year	Film	Role	Co-Star	Notes
1923	The Call of the Canyon	Eleanor Harmon	Richard Dix	
1924	Oh, Teacher!	The Teacher	Eddie Boland	
1924	Jonah Jones	Margaret Morgan	Lloyd Hamilton	
1924	Crushed	Miss Brown	Lloyd Hamilton	
1925	Hooked	Dorothy	Lloyd Hamilton	Lost film
1925	The Dressmaker From Paris	Mannequin	Leatrice Joy	
1925	Half A Hero	The Daughter	Lloyd Hamilton	One Reel Survives
1925	Fifth Avenue Models	Mannequin	Mary Philbin	Copy in UCLA Archive
1925	King Cotton		Lloyd Hamilton	Lost film
1925	Pretty Ladies	Diamond Tights	Zasu Pitts	
1925	We Moderns	Dolly Wimple	Colleen Moore	Lost film
1926	It Must Be Love	Min	Colleen Moore	Lost film
