= Don Juan's Three Nights =

1926 film

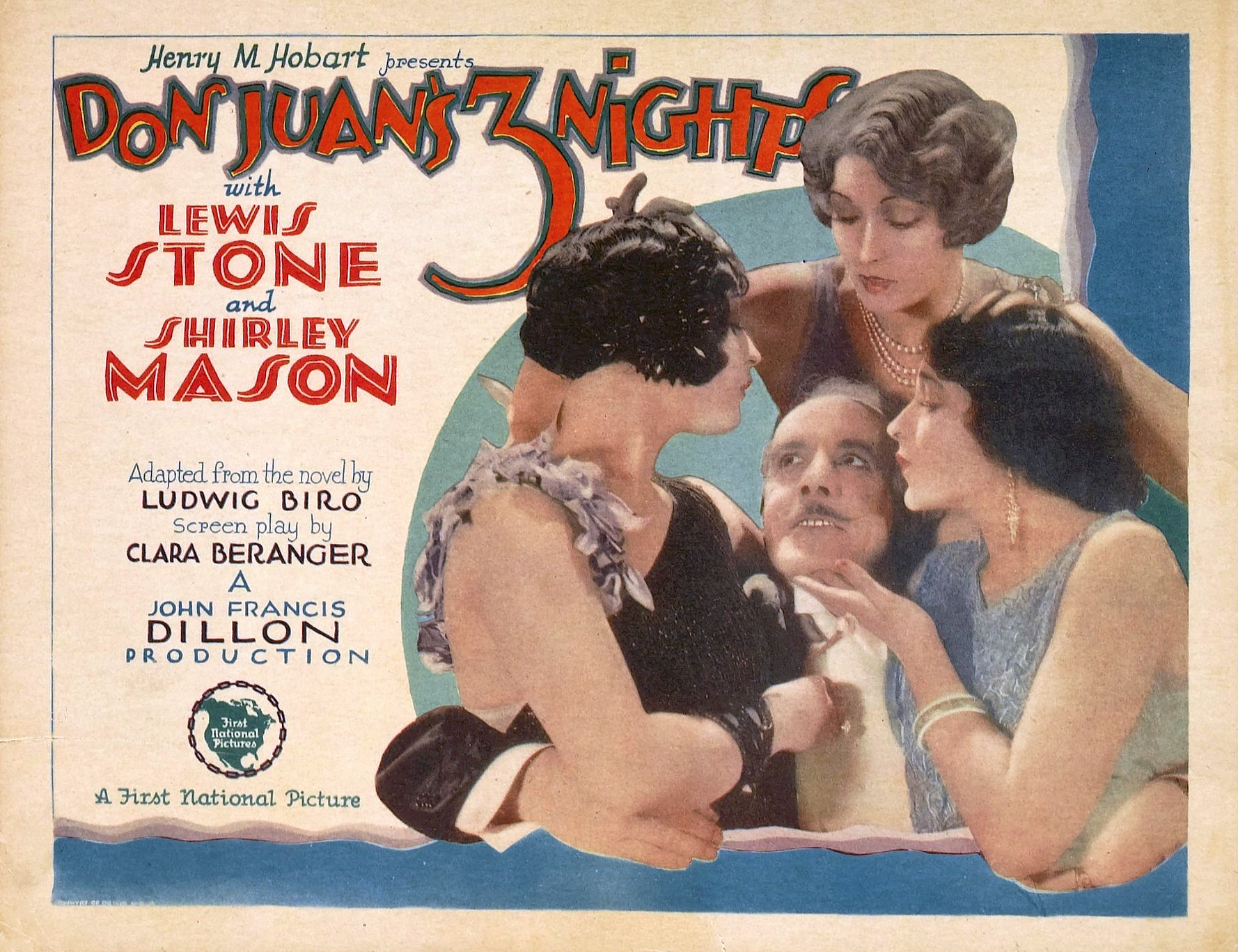
- Lobby card
- Directed by: John Francis Dillon
- Written by: Clara Beranger (adaptation & scenario); Gerald Duffy (intertitles)
- Based on: novel, Lajos Bíró
- Produced by: Henry Hobart
- Starring: Lewis Stone; Shirley Mason; Malcolm McGregor
- Cinematography: James Van Trees
- Distributed by: First National Pictures
- Release date: September 4, 1926 (New York)
- Running time: 76 minutes
- Country: United States
- Language: Silent (English intertitles)

Don Juan's Three Nights also known as Don Juan's 3 Nights is a 1926 American silent romantic drama film directed by John Francis Dillon and starring Lewis Stone, Shirley Mason, and Malcolm McGregor. It was produced by Henry Hobart and distributed through First National Pictures.

== Cast ==
- Lewis Stone as Johann Aradi
- Shirley Mason as Ninette Cavallar
- Malcolm McGregor as Giulio Roberti
- Myrtle Stedman as Madame Cavallar
- Betty Francisco as Madame de Courcy
- Kalla Pasha as Monsieur de Courcy
- Alma Bennett as Carlotta
- Natalie Kingston as Vilma Theodori
- Mario Carillo as Count di Bonito
- Jed Prouty as Lippi
- Madeline Hurlock as Louise Villate
- Gertrude Astor as Baroness von Minden

== Preservation ==
Complete prints of Don Juan's Three Nights are held by the Library of Congress and the Wisconsin Center for Film and Theater Research in Madison, Wisconsin.

== See also ==
- Gertrude Astor filmography
