= George Folsey =

American cinematographer

George J. Folsey
- Born: George Joseph Folsey; July 2, 1898; Brooklyn, New York, U.S.
- Died: November 1, 1988 (aged 90); Santa Monica, California, U.S.
- Occupation: Cinematographer
- Years active: 1914–1976
- Title: A.S.C.
- Board member of: A.S.C. President (1956–1957)
- Children: George Folsey, Jr.
- Awards: American Society of Cinematographers Lifetime Achievement Award 1988

George Joseph Folsey, A.S.C., was an American cinematographer who worked on 162 films from 1914 to his retirement in 1976. He was one of the main cinematographers at Metro-Goldwyn-Mayer for 27 years and was nominated for 13 Academy Awards and was a pioneer in many cinematography techniques. He was the recipient of the first Lifetime Achievement Award presented by the American Society of Cinematographers in 1988, for whom he had served as president in 1956–1957. Film critic Todd McCarthy called him one of Hollywood's most distinguished cinematographers for 50 years.

== Biography ==
Born in 1898 in Brooklyn, New York, Folsey began his film career at the age of 14, when he was hired by Jesse Lasky to work as an office boy in his newly formed Jesse L. Lasky Feature Play Company in New York City.

At the age of 16, he started work as an assistant cameraman and learnt from H. Lyman Broening. He worked as assistant cameraman for directors Edwin S. Porter and J. Searle Dawley. He was promoted to second cameraman and by the age of 19 he had become a cinematographer.

Folsey earned his first screen credit for His Bridal Night in 1919 working for director Kenneth Webb with whom he also made The Fear Market, Sinners and The Stolen Kiss (all 1920). During the 1920s, he worked for Associated First National and Biograph Studios, working multiple times with directors Edward Dillon, Chester M. Franklin, Roy William Neill, George Archainbaud and John Francis Dillon. Leading lady Alice Brady was so satisfied with the way he photographed her she offered him a contract to shoot all her films.

He joined Paramount Astoria Studios, where his films included Rouben Mamoulian's directorial debut, Applause (1929), and the Marx Brothers' screen debut The Cocoanuts (1929) and Animal Crackers (1930).

In 1932, he moved to Los Angeles to work for Metro-Goldwyn-Mayer, where he spent the bulk of his career. His first film there was Reunion in Vienna (1933), for which he received his first nomination for the Academy Award for Best Cinematography. Folsey was nominated 13 times but never won. He was also nominated for Operator 13 (1934), The Gorgeous Hussy (1936), Thousands Cheer (1943), The White Cliffs of Dover (1944), Meet Me in St. Louis (1944), The Green Years (1946), Green Dolphin Street (1947), Million Dollar Mermaid (1952), All the Brothers Were Valiant (1953), Executive Suite (1954), Seven Brides for Seven Brothers (1954) and The Balcony (1963).

As well as working with Vincente Minnelli on Meet Me in St. Louis, he also worked with him on The Clock, Ziegfeld Follies (both 1945) and The Cobweb (1955) as well as uncredited work on The Band Wagon (1953).

From 1962, he started working in television, serving as director of photography for various episodes of the series The Fugitive and a special about figure skater Peggy Fleming (Here's Peggy Fleming) for which he won an Emmy Award for Best Cinematography for Nonfiction Programming in 1969.

He returned to MGM to shoot new dance sequences featuring Fred Astaire and Gene Kelly for That's Entertainment, Part II (1976). After retirement he gave lectures for the American Film Institute.

Folsey's son George Jr. was a director/producer/editor.

Folsey died in Santa Monica, California following a stroke and long illness.

== Filmography ==
- His Bridal Night (1919)
- The Fear Market (1920)
- Sinners (1920)
- The Stolen Kiss (1920)
- The Frisky Mrs. Johnson (1920)
- The Price of Possession (1921)
- Sheltered Daughters (1921)
- A Heart to Let (1921)
- Room and Board (1921)
- The Case of Becky (1921)
- Nancy from Nowhere (1922)
- A Game Chicken (1922)
- Slim Shoulders (1922)
- What's Wrong with the Women? (1922)
- The Man from M.A.R.S. (1922)
- The Bright Shawl (1923)
- The Fighting Blade (1923)
- Twenty-One (1923)
- The Enchanted Cottage (1924)
- Born Rich (1924)
- The Necessary Evil (1925)
- The Half-Way Girl (1925)
- Scarlet Saint (1925)
- Too Much Money (1926)
- The Savage (1926)
- Ladies at Play (1926)
- Orchids and Ermine (1927)
- See You in Jail (1927)
- Naughty but Nice (1927)
- American Beauty (1927)
- No Place to Go (1927)
- Her Wild Oat (1927)
- Lady Be Good (1928)
- The Butter and Egg Man (1928)
- The Letter (1929)
- The Hole in the Wall (1929)
- Gentlemen of the Press (1929)
- The Cocoanuts (1929)
- Applause (1929)
- The Battle of Paris (1929)
- Glorifying the American Girl (1929)
- The Laughing Lady (1929)
- The Big Pond (1930)
- Dangerous Nan McGrew (1930)
- Animal Crackers (1930)
- Laughter (1930)
- The Royal Family of Broadway (1930)
- Stolen Heaven (1931)
- Honor Among Lovers (1931)
- The Smiling Lieutenant (1931)
- Secrets of a Secretary (1931)
- My Sin (1931)
- The Cheat (1931)
- The Wiser Sex (1932)
- The Misleading Lady (1932)
- The Big Broadcast (1932)
- The Animal Kingdom (1932)
- Men Must Fight (1933)
- Reunion in Vienna (1933)
- Storm at Daybreak (1933)
- Stage Mother (1933)
- Going Hollywood (1933)
- Men in White (1934)
- Operator 13 (1934)
- Chained (1934)
- Forsaking All Others (1934)
- Reckless (1935)
- Page Miss Glory (1935)
- I Live My Life (1935)
- Kind Lady (1935)
- The Great Ziegfeld (1936)
- Hearts Divided (1936)
- The Gorgeous Hussy (1936)
- The Last of Mrs. Cheyney (1937)
- The Bride Wore Red (1937)
- Mannequin (1937)
- Arsene Lupin Returns (1938)
- Hold That Kiss (1938)
- The Shining Hour (1938)
- Fast and Loose (1939)
- Society Lawyer (1939)
- Lady of the Tropics (1939)
- Remember? (1939)
- Two Girls on Broadway (1940)
- Third Finger, Left Hand (1940)
- Come Live with Me (1941)
- The Trial of Mary Dugan (1941)
- Free and Easy (1941)
- Dr. Kildare's Wedding Day (1941)
- Lady Be Good (1941)
- Married Bachelor (1942)
- Rio Rita (1942)
- Grand Central Murder (1942)
- Panama Hattie (1942)
- Andy Hardy's Double Life (1942)
- Seven Sweethearts (1942)
- Dr. Gillespie's New Assistant (1942)
- Three Hearts for Julia (1943)
- Thousands Cheer (1943)
- A Guy Named Joe (1943)
- The White Cliffs of Dover (1944)
- Meet Me in St. Louis (1944)
- The Clock (1945)
- Ziegfeld Follies (1945)
- The Harvey Girls (1946)
- The Green Years (1946)
- Till the Clouds Roll By (1946)
- The Secret Heart (1947)
- Green Dolphin Street (1947)
- If Winter Comes (1948)
- State of the Union (1948)
- Take Me Out to the Ball Game (1949)
- The Great Sinner (1949)
- Adam's Rib (1949)
- Malaya (1949)
- The Big Hangover (1950)
- A Life of Her Own (1950)
- Vengeance Valley (1951)
- Mr. Imperium (1951)
- Night into Morning (1951)
- The Law and the Lady (1951)
- The Man with a Cloak (1951)
- Shadow in the Sky (1952)
- Lovely to Look At (1952)
- Million Dollar Mermaid (1952)
- All the Brothers Were Valiant (1953)
- The Band Wagon (1953) (uncredited)
- Executive Suite (1954)
- Tennessee Champ (1954)
- Men of the Fighting Lady (1954)
- Seven Brides for Seven Brothers (1954)
- Deep in My Heart (1954)
- Hit the Deck (1955)
- The Cobweb (1955)
- Forbidden Planet (1956)
- The Fastest Gun Alive (1956)
- These Wilder Years (1956)
- The Power and the Prize (1956)
- House of Numbers (1957)
- Tip on a Dead Jockey (1957)
- Saddle the Wind (1958)
- The High Cost of Loving (1958)
- Imitation General (1958)
- Torpedo Run (1958)
- Count Your Blessings (1959)
- Cash McCall (1960)
- I Passed for White (1960)
- The Balcony (1963)
- Glass Houses (1972)
- Bone (1972)
- That's Entertainment, Part II (1976)
