= See You in Jail =

1927 film

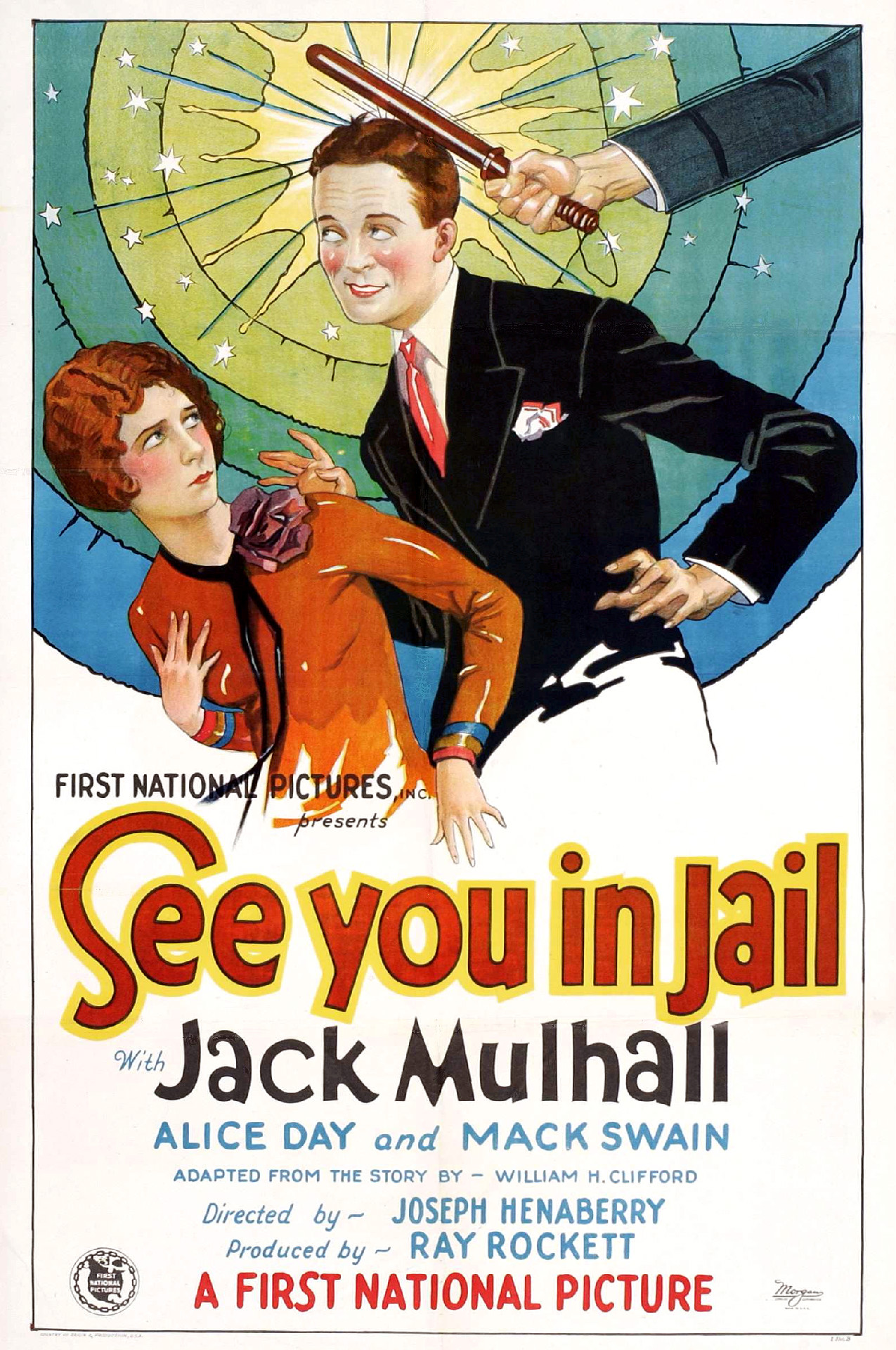
- Film poster
- Directed by: Joseph Henabery
- Written by: Gerald Duffy (scenario); William Clifford (story)
- Produced by: Ray Rocket
- Starring: Jack Mulhall; Alice Day
- Cinematography: George J. Folsey
- Distributed by: First National
- Release date: April 17, 1927
- Running time: 60 minutes; 6 reels
- Country: USA
- Language: Silent..English titles

See You in Jail is a 1927 silent film comedy directed by Joseph Henabery and starring Jack Mulhall. The film was produced by Ray Rocket and distributed through First National Pictures.

== Cast ==
- Jack Mulhall - Jerry Marsden
- Alice Day - Ruth Morrisey
- Mack Swain - Slossom
- George Fawcett - Marsden, Sr.
- Crauford Kent - Roger Morrisey
- John Kolb - Jailer
- William Orlamond - Inventor
- Leo White - Valet
- Carl Stockdale - Attorney
- Burr McIntosh - Judge Hauser
- Charles Clary - Rollins

== Preservation status ==
A copy of the film is preserved in the British Film Institute(BFI), National Film and Television Archive, London.
