= Out of the Ruins (film) =

1928 film

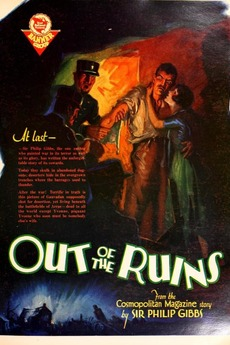
- Directed by: John Francis Dillon
- Written by: Gerald Duffy (scenario); Casey Robinson (intertitles)
- Story by: Philip Gibbs
- Produced by: Henry Hobart
- Cinematography: Ernest Haller
- Edited by: Cyril Gardner
- Distributed by: First National Pictures
- Release date: August 19, 1928
- Running time: 70 minutes
- Country: United States
- Language: Silent film (English intertitles)

Out of the Ruins is a 1928 silent film drama produced and distributed by First National Pictures.John Francis Dillon directed and Richard Barthelmess stars. The film had its opening in New York City on August 18, 1928.

== Cast ==
- Richard Barthelmess as Lt. Pierre Dumont
- Robert Frazer as Paul Gilbert
- Marian Nixon as Yvonne Gilbert
- Emile Chautard as Pere Gilbert
- Bodil Rosing as Mere Gilbert
- Eugene Pallette as Volange
- Rose Dione as Mere Gourdain

== Preservation ==
Out of the Ruins is currently presumed lost. In February of 2021, the film was cited by the National Film Preservation Board on their Lost U.S. Silent Feature Films list.
