= No Place to Go (1927 film) =

1927 film by Mervyn LeRoy

- Directed by: Mervyn LeRoy
- Written by: Dwinelle Benthall; Richard Connell; Adelaide Heilbron; Rufus McCosh
- Produced by: Henry Hobart
- Starring: Mary Astor; Lloyd Hughes; Hallam Cooley
- Cinematography: George J. Folsey
- Production company: Henry Hobart Productions
- Distributed by: First National Pictures
- Release date: October 30, 1927
- Running time: 70 minutes
- Country: United States
- Languages: Silent; English intertitles

No Place to Go is a 1927 American silent romance film directed by Mervyn LeRoy and starring Mary Astor, Lloyd Hughes and Hallam Cooley.

== Plot ==
A wealthy young woman and a bank clerk elope during a cruise in the South Seas. Their disappearance causes concern, which is apparently justified because the two are attacked by savages on an island before they can marry. Marriage eventually occurs after the two return home, but more problems ensue. The film was based on Richard Connell's story, Isles of Romance, which appeared in the April 12, 1924, issue of The Saturday Evening Post.

== Cast ==
- Mary Astor as Sally Montgomery
- Lloyd Hughes as Hayden Eaton
- Hallam Cooley as Ambrose Munn
- Myrtle Stedman as Mrs. Montgomery
- Virginia Lee Corbin as Virginia Dare
- Jed Prouty as Uncle Edgar
- Russ Powell as Cannibal Chief

== Production ==
In addition to Leroy as director, Henry Hobart was the film's producer. Adelaide Heilbron adapted the story and wrote the screenplay. George Folsey was director of photography. The film was distributed by First National Pictures, Inc.

== Status ==
As of 2018, one copy of No Place to Go was known to exist. The British Film Institute's archives contained "an original 35mm nitrate print ... in need of restoration".
