= The Spider and the Rose =

1923 silent film

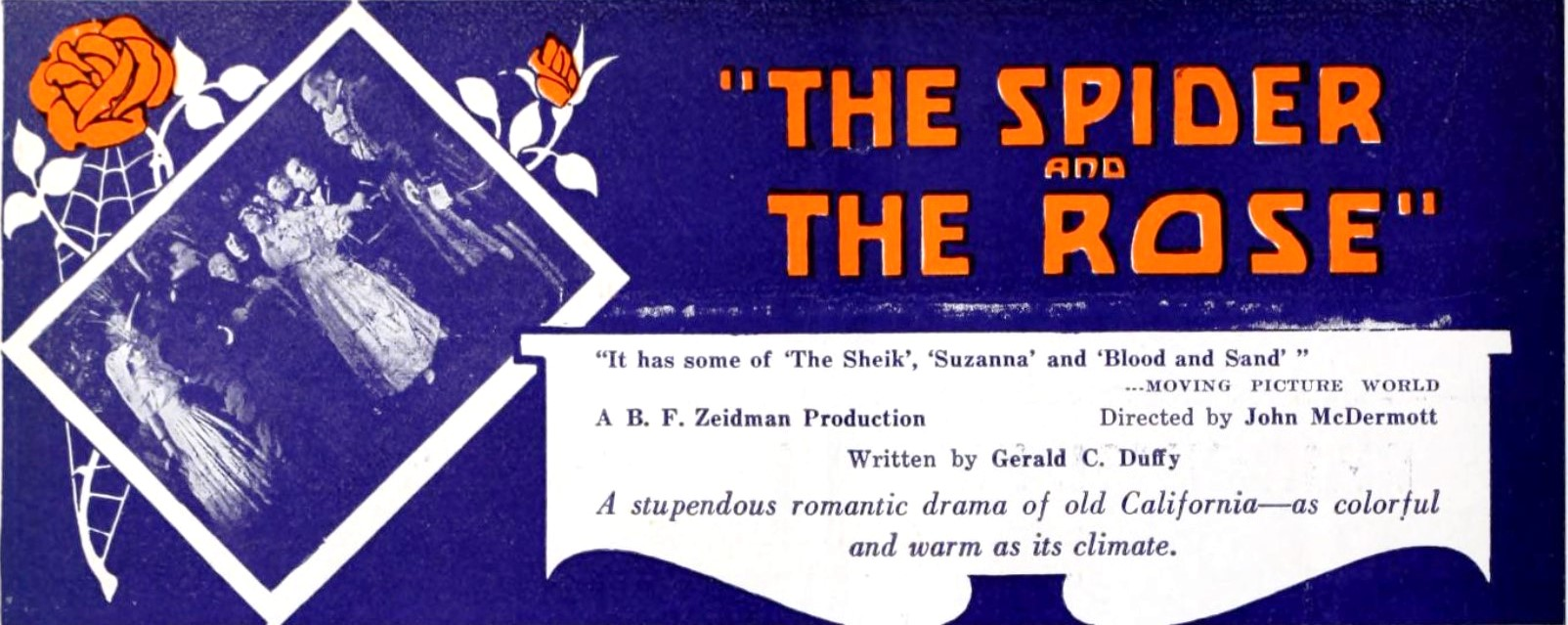
- Directed by: John McDermott
- Written by: Gerald C. Duffy
- Starring: Alice Lake; Richard Headrick; Gaston Glass
- Cinematography: Glen MacWilliams; Charles Richardson
- Production company: B.F. Zeidman Productions
- Distributed by: Principal Distributing
- Release date: February 15, 1923
- Running time: 70 minutes
- Country: United States
- Languages: Silent; English intertitles

The Spider and the Rose is a 1923 American silent historical drama film directed by John McDermott and starring Alice Lake, Richard Headrick and Gaston Glass.

== Cast ==
- Alice Lake as Paula
- Richard Headrick as Don Marcello, as a child
- Gaston Glass as Don Marcello
- Joseph J. Dowling as The Governor
- Robert McKim as Mendozza
- Noah Beery as Maître Renaud
- Otis Harlan as The Secretary
- Frank Campeau as Don Fernando
- Andrew Arbuckle as The Priest
- Alec B. Francis as Good Padre
- Edwin Stevens as Bishop Oliveros
- Louise Fazenda as Dolores

== Bibliography ==
- Munden, Kenneth White. The American Film Institute Catalog of Motion Pictures Produced in the United States, Part 1. University of California Press, 1997.
