= Gerald Duffy =

American journalist (1896–1928)

- Born: April 13, 1896; New York, New York, USA
- Died: June 25, 1928 (aged 32); Los Angeles, California, USA

Gerald C. Duffy (April 13, 1896 – June 25, 1928) was a screenwriter of the silent film era, journalist, short story writer, and copyeditor. He is known for his contributions to and editorship of Redbook magazine and was nominated for an Academy Award for Best Title Writing in 1929 for the film The Private Life of Helen of Troy.

His fiction career led to him being hired as a writer by First National Pictures.

== Death ==
Gerald died in 1928 while dictating a script in Los Angeles, California.

== Selected filmography ==
- The Yellow Bullet
- A Fighting Colleen (1919)
- Jinx (1919)
- Dollars and Sense (1920)
- The Slim Princess (1920)
- Officer 666 (1920)
- What Happened to Rosa (1920)
- Hold Your Horses (1921)
- Trust Your Wife (1921)
- Through the Back Door (1921)
- Her Social Value (1921)
- Where's My Wandering Boy Tonight? (1922)
- Head Over Heels (1922)
- Mr. Barnes of New York (1922)
- Sure Fire Flint (1922)
- The Spider and the Rose (1923)
- You Are Guilty (1923)
- Bright Lights of Broadway (1923)
- The Spider and the Rose (1923)
- Three O'Clock in the Morning (1923)
- Roulette (1924)
- The Recoil (1924)
- Her Own Free Will (1924)
- Youth for Sale (1924)
- Trouping with Ellen (1924)
- Argentine Love (1924)
- Too Many Kisses (1925)
- The Sky Raider (1925)
- Tramp, Tramp, Tramp (1926)
- The College Boob (1926)
- Don Juan's Three Nights (1926)
- Kosher Kitty Kelly (1926)
- The Timid Terror (1926)
- Bred in Old Kentucky (1926)
- The Masked Woman (1927)
- The Notorious Lady (1927)
- See You in Jail (1927)
- The Patent Leather Kid (1927)
- The Crystal Cup (1927)
- The Private Life of Helen of Troy (1927)
- Her Wild Oat (1927)
- The Heart of a Follies Girl (1928)
- Wheel of Chance (1928)
- The Head Man (1928)
- Out of the Ruins (1928)

== Awards and nominations ==
| Year | Award | Category | Nominated work | Result | Ref |
|---|---|---|---|---|---|
| 1929 | Academy Awards | Academy Award for Best Title Writing | The Private Life of Helen of Troy | Nominated (posthumous) | |
