= We Moderns =

1925 film

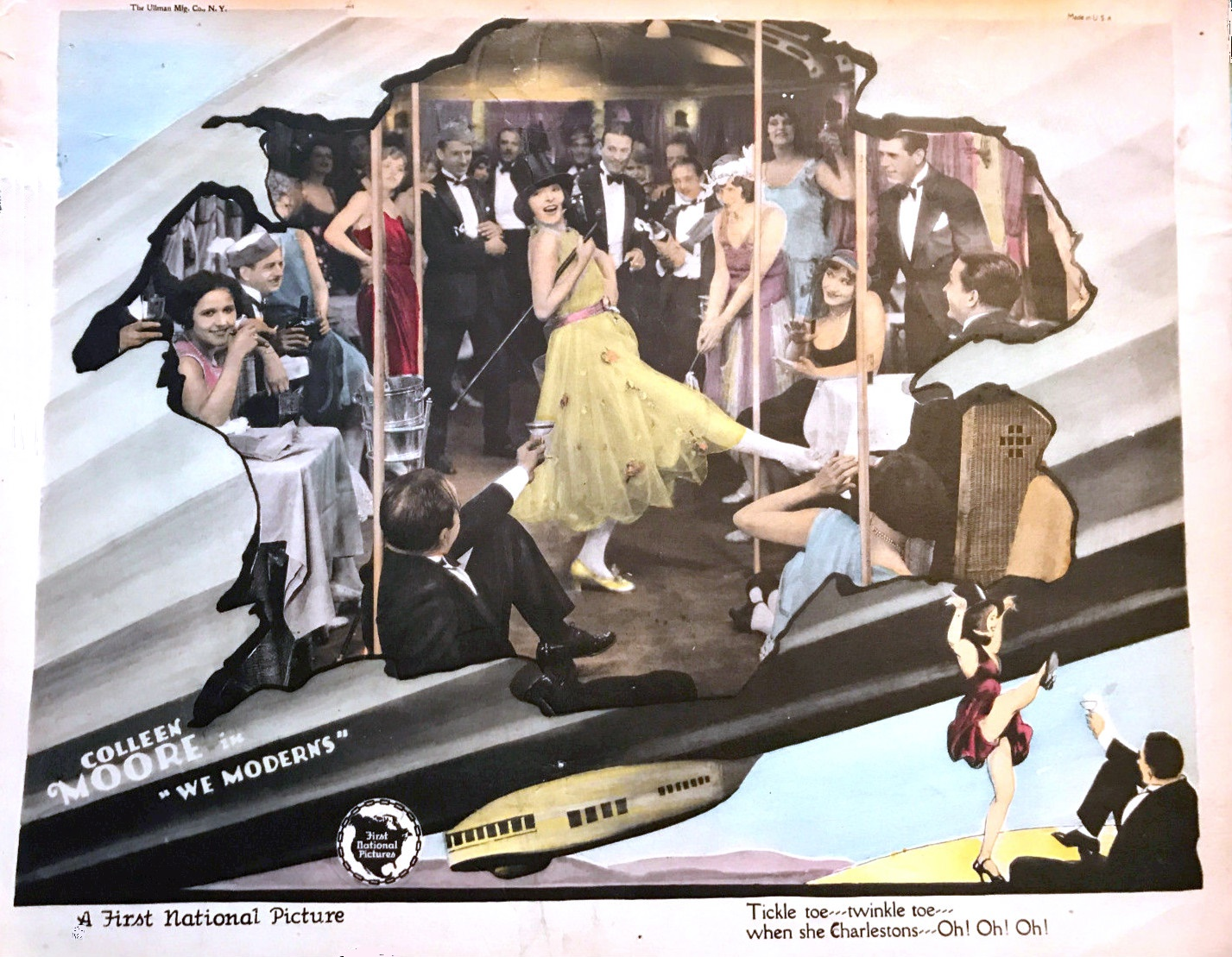
- Lobby card
- Directed by: John Francis Dillon
- Written by: June Mathis (scenario)
- Based on: We Moderns by Israel Zangwill
- Produced by: John McCormick
- Starring: Colleen Moore
- Cinematography: Ted D. McCord
- Edited by: Edwin Robbins
- Production company: John McCormick Productions
- Distributed by: First National Pictures
- Release date: November 15, 1925
- Running time: 7 reels; between 6,609 and 6,656 feet
- Country: United States
- Language: Silent (English intertitles)

We Moderns is a 1925 American silent comedy film directed by John Francis Dillon and starring Colleen Moore. The film was produced by Moore's husband John McCormick and was released through First National Pictures. It was based on the play and novel by Israel Zangwill, which ran for 22 performances in 1924 at the Gaiety Theatre in New York, produced and directed by Harrison Grey Fiske and starring Helen Hayes and Isabel Irving.

== Plot ==
As described in a film magazine review, Mary Sundale is a young woman who spurns her childhood sweetheart to attach herself to a large group of riotous, semi-artistic young people and becomes infatuated with a superficial poet and critic. One night this poet becomes too bold in his advances and is thrashed by the man who has been rejected. On a later night, the group holds a party in a dirigible. The ship crashes and fear grips the revelers. Mary, now disgusted with the group and all it represents, mends her manner of living and plans a future with the man who has always sincerely loved her.

== Cast ==
- Colleen Moore as Mary Sundale
- Jack Mulhall as John Ashler
- Carl Miller as Oscar Pleat
- Claude Gillingwater as Sir Robert Sundale
- Clarissa Selwynne as Lady Kitty Sundale
- Cleve Morison as Dick Sundale
- Marcelle Corday as Theodosia
- Blanche Payson as Johanna
- Tom McGuire as Beamish
- Dorothy Seastrom as Dolly Wimple
- Louis Payne as Sir William Wimple

== Production ==
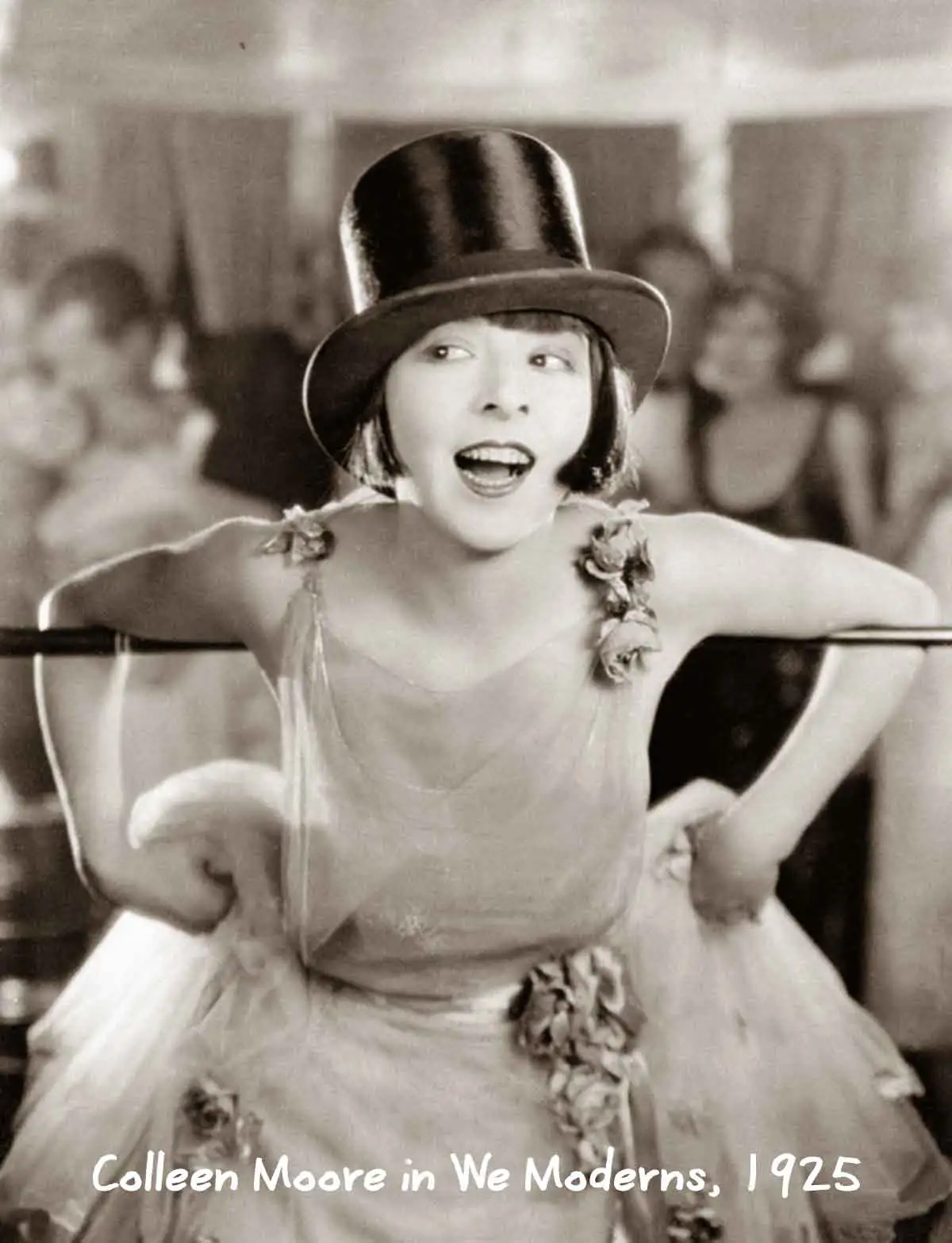
Colleen Moore in We Moderns (1925)

Portions of the film were shot on location in and around London while Colleen was in the city during her European tour, which was undertaken to promote her films So Big and Sally. Those portions were directed by her husband and depicted a scavenger hunt, so that the production could visit many famous and recognizable London locations . A car was purchased specifically for the film and was shipped back to the states so that the film could be completed at the studio. Colleen had to acquire a special permit to drive.

The film was intended to be an English look at the flapper, and the story shared many of the same elements of Colleen's star-making Flaming Youth. As in Flaming Youth, Colleen's brother Cleeve had a part in this film as well. He played the brother of Colleen's character.

== Preservation ==
With no record of any prints of We Moderns located in any film archives, it is a lost film. A short fragment of the film was found on the YouTube channel @Dario10‑u9r.

== See also ==
- List of lost films

== Bibliography ==
- Jeff Codori, Colleen Moore; A Biography of the Silent Film Star, McFarland Publishing (2012) ISBN 978-0-7864-4969-9 (print) ISBN 978-0-7864-8899-5 (eBook)
