= The Perfect Flapper =

1924 film by John Francis Dillon

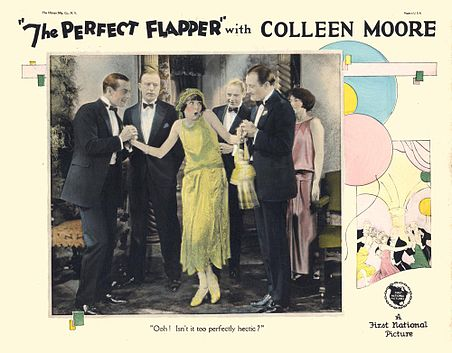
- Directed by: John Francis Dillon
- Written by: Jessie Henderson (story); Joseph F. Poland
- Produced by: Earl Hudson
- Starring: Colleen Moore; Sydney Chaplin; Phyllis Haver; Lydia Knott
- Production company: John McCormick Productions
- Distributed by: First National Pictures
- Release date: May 25, 1924
- Running time: 70 minutes
- Country: United States
- Language: Silent (English intertitles)

The Perfect Flapper is a 1924 American silent romantic comedy film directed by Earl Hudson and starring Colleen Moore. This was Moore's second "flapper film" after Flaming Youth. It was released after Through the Dark (made before Flaming Youth but in theaters after its release) and Painted People.

== Story ==
Young debutante Tommie Lou is unpopular. At her coming-out party, she turns to jazz antics to liven things up. After drinking punch spiked with alcohol (illegal at the time, as the film was made during Prohibition), she gets drunk and runs off to a road house with the husband of a friend. Nothing happens between them, but the action provokes a split between the husband and his wife. She contrives to get the couple back together, falling for the wife's divorce lawyer, and in the end everyone lives happily.

== Cast ==
- Colleen Moore as Tommie Lou Pember
- Sydney Chaplin as Dick Trayle
- Phyllis Haver as Gertrude Trayle
- Lydia Knott as Aunt Sarah
- Frank Mayo as Reed Andrews
- Charles Wellesley as Joshua Pember
- Carl D. Bruner as Minor Role (uncredited)
- Babe London as Minor Role (uncredited)

== Production ==
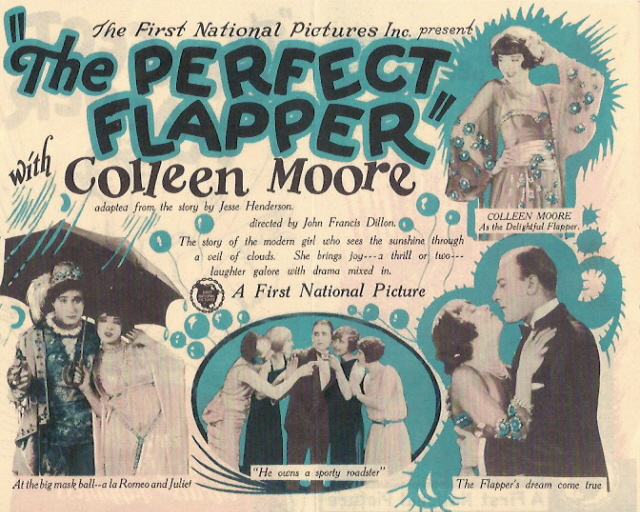
Ad for The Perfect Flapper

The film was made in the wake of the tremendous hit Flaming Youth. Originally intended to reunite the cast and crew of Flaming Youth, not everyone was available. The film was made as a comedy with dramatic undertones, while Flaming Youth had been a drama with comic aspects. To cash in on the popularity of Colleen's "flapper" character, the word "flapper" made it into the title. An additional draw was that the film showed a lot of skin. Sydney Chaplin was, of course, Charlie's older half-brother.

== Reception ==
The film was generally well-received as good light entertainment: "...you have been entertained and not caused to think too much.” The film did not match the popularity of Flaming Youth: an accounting of the earnings of Colleen's pictures dated December 31, 1928 lists total earnings of Flaming Youth at $798,777 by 1928; The Perfect Flapper earned $531,008.56.

== Preservation ==
A print of The Perfect Flapper is preserved at the Library of Congress along with a trailer.

== Bibliography ==
- Jeff Codori (2012), Colleen Moore; A Biography of the Silent Film Star, McFarland Publishing, (Print ISBN 978-0-7864-4969-9, EBook ISBN 978-0-7864-8899-5).
