= It Must Be Love (1926 film) =

1926 film by Alfred Edward Green

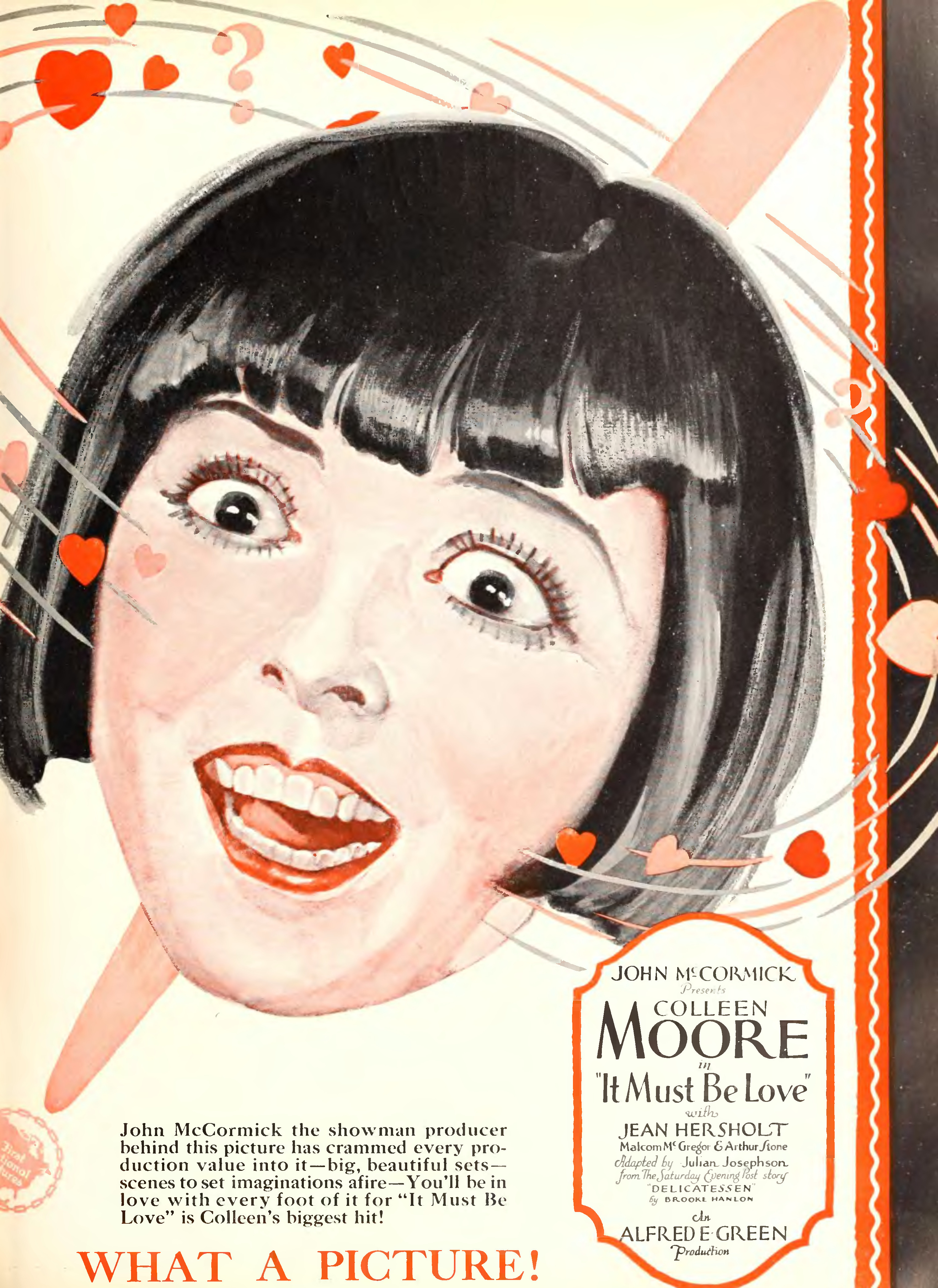
- Advertisement
- Directed by: Alfred E. Green
- Written by: Brooke Hanlon (story); Julien Josephson; Rob Wagner
- Produced by: John McCormick
- Starring: Colleen Moore; Jean Hersholt; Malcolm McGregor
- Cinematography: Hans F. Koenekamp
- Production company: John McCormick Productions
- Distributed by: First National Pictures
- Release date: August 22, 1926
- Running time: 70 minutes
- Country: United States
- Language: Silent (English intertitles)

It Must Be Love is a 1926 American silent comedy film directed by Alfred E. Green and starring Colleen Moore, Jean Hersholt, and Malcolm McGregor.

== Plot ==
Fernie Schmidt lives with her parents in the rear of their delicatessen. The smells of the business - cheeses, sausages, garlic and pickled herrings - repulses Fernie, who dreams of removing herself from the environment and moving into a life with a more rarified. Her father, Pop Schmidt has plans for his daughter to marry Peter Halitovsky, a sausage salesman, but Fernie is repulsed by the idea. At a dance, Fernie meets Jack Dugan, who tells her that he is in stocks, a paper-counter, and she falls for him. Because of her rejection of her father's chosen candidate for matrimony, Pop puts Fernie out of the house.

Fernie manages to find works as a counter girl in a department store. Luckily, the job is at the perfume counter. Jack, in due course, proposes to Fernie. Before she can give her answer, she is invited back home by Pop for dinner, at which time he announces he is going to buy a new home, removing himself from the back of the fragrant delicatessen. Peter is there and he proposes to her, but before she can reject him Jack appears on the scene, declaring that he has purchased a delicatessen business. Seeing that marrying Jack would return her to the life she wishes to flee, she finds herself resolved to the fate of marrying her father's choice of husband, Peter.

== Cast ==
- Colleen Moore as Fernie Schmidt
- Jean Hersholt as Pop Schmidt
- Malcolm McGregor as Jack Dugan
- Arthur Stone as Peter Halitovsky
- Bodil Rosing as Mom Schmidt
- Dorothy Seastrom as Min
- Cleve Moore as Al
- Mary O'Brien as Lois
- Ray Hallor as Joe

== Preservation ==
With no known prints located in any film archives, It Must Be Love is considered a lost film.

== Bibliography ==
- Monaco, James. The Encyclopedia of Film. Perigee Books, 1991.
