= Henry Hobart (producer) =

American film producer

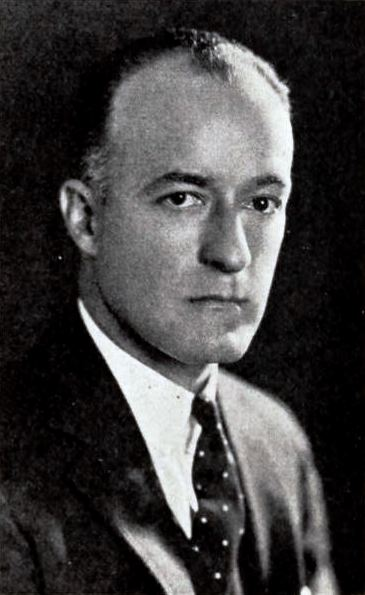
- From a 1922 film magazine
- Born: Henry Morgan Hobart; March 22, 1888; Brooklyn, New York, United States
- Died: 1951; Los Angeles, California, United States
- Occupation: Producer
- Years active: 1926–1935

Henry Hobart (March 22, 1888 – 1951) was an American film producer during the late silent and early sound eras in the motion picture era. Initially, he was president of Distinctive Productions, but later formed his own independent production company, Henry Hobart Productions. All three of the silent films he produced for his company were distributed by First National Pictures. In 1928, Hobart would go to work for First National, and then would move over to the newly formed RKO Radio Pictures after the advent of talking pictures in 1929.

== Filmography ==
(as per AFI's database)

Year	Title	Studio	
1926	Don Juan's Three Nights	Henry Hobart Productions	Silent
1927	The Crystal Cup	Henry Hobart Productions	Silent
1927	No Place to Go	Henry Hobart Productions	Silent
1928	The Little Shepherd of Kingdom Come	First National Pictures	Silent
1928	The Noose	First National Pictures	Silent
1928	Out of the Ruins	First National Pictures	Silent
1928	Sailors' Wives	First National Pictures	Silent
1928	Three-Ring Marriage	First National Pictures	Silent
1929	Dance Hall	RKO Radio Pictures	Talkie
1930	Alias French Gertie	RKO Radio Pictures	Talkie
1930	Beau Bandit	RKO Radio Pictures	Talkie
1930	Framed	RKO Radio Pictures	Talkie
1930	Half Shot at Sunrise	RKO Radio Pictures	Talkie
1930	Lawful Larceny	RKO Radio Pictures	Talkie
1930	Love Comes Along	RKO Radio Pictures	Talkie
1930	She's My Weakness	RKO Radio Pictures	Talkie
1931	Bachelor Apartment	RKO Radio Pictures	Talkie
1931	The Royal Bed	RKO Radio Pictures	Talkie
1931	Behind Office Doors	RKO Radio Pictures	Talkie
1931	High Stakes	RKO Radio Pictures	Talkie
1931	White Shoulders	RKO Radio Pictures	Talkie
1935	Sunset Range	First Division Productions	Talkie
