= John Francis Dillon (director) =

American film director (1884–1934)

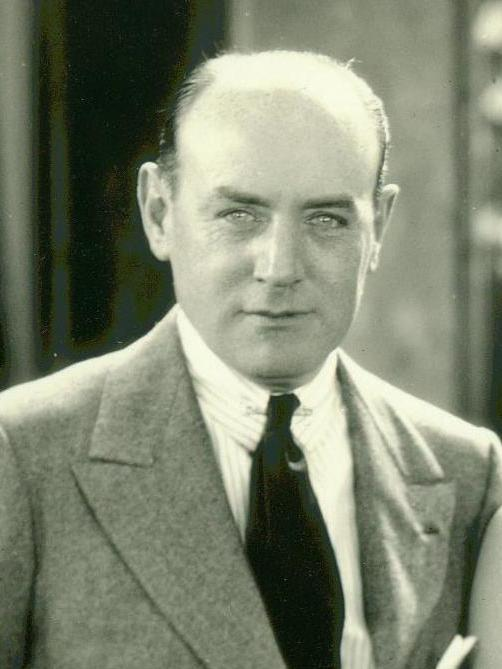
- Dillon on the set of Love's Blindness, 1926
- Born: July 13, 1884; New York, New York
- Died: April 4, 1934 (aged 49); Los Angeles, California
- Other name: Jack Dillon
- Occupations: Film director Actor
- Years active: 1914–1934

John Francis Dillon (July 13, 1884 – April 4, 1934) was an American film director and actor of the silent era. He directed 130 films between 1914 and 1934. He also appeared in 74 films between 1914 and 1931. He was born in New York, New York, was a brother of Robert A. Dillon, and died in Los Angeles, California from a heart attack. He was married to the actress Edith Hallor.

== Partial filmography ==
- Dough and Dynamite (1914)
- Indiscreet Corinne (1917)
- Suds (1920)
- The Plaything of Broadway (1921)
- The Cub Reporter (1922)
- The Yellow Stain (1922)
- Flaming Youth (1923)
- Double Dealing (1923) (actor)
- The Self-Made Wife (1923)
- The Broken Violin (1923)
- Lilies of the Field (1924)
- Flirting with Love (1924)
- The Perfect Flapper (1924)
- The Half-Way Girl (1925)
- We Moderns (1925)
- The Test of Donald Norton (1926) (actor)
- Don Juan's Three Nights (1926)
- Midnight Lovers (1926)
- Love's Blindness (1926)
- The Prince of Headwaiters (1927)
- Temptations of a Shop Girl (1927) (actor)
- The Noose (1928)
- The Heart of a Follies Girl (1928)
- Out of the Ruins (1928)
- Scarlet Seas (1929)
- Sally (1929)
- Children of the Ritz (1929)
- Bride of the Regiment (1930)
- The Girl of the Golden West (1930)
- Kismet (1930)
- Millie (1931)
- The Finger Points (1931)
- The Pagan Lady (1931)
- Behind the Mask (1932)
- Call Her Savage (1932)
- The Big Shakedown (1934)
