= List of incomplete or partially lost films =

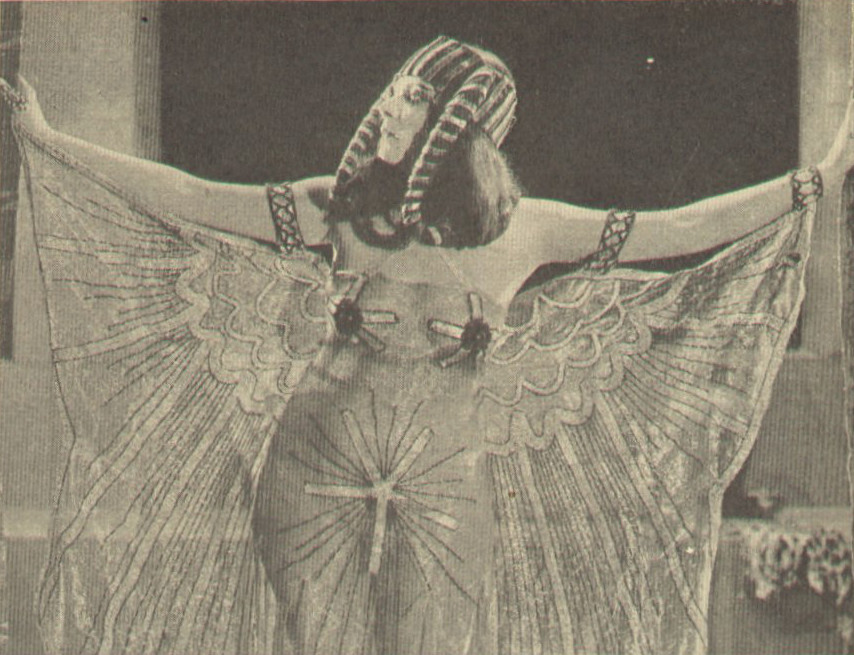
Theda Bara in a surviving scene from the partially lost 1917 film Cleopatra

The following is a list of notable films that are incomplete or partially lost. For films for which no footage (including trailers) is known to have survived, see List of lost films. For films that were never completed in the first place, see List of abandoned and unfinished films.

== Films restored from different sources ==
Sometimes a film can be patched together from multiple sources to present the movie as intended.

In the case of horror films made in the 1980s, much of the gore was removed from the negatives and would only be retained on VHS tapes that chose to retain it. When restoring these films as intended, the VHS source mixed with 4K Ultra HD does not match well, and can never be re-watched in their optimal form. On this matter David Gregory, founder of the distribution company Severin Films, said: "When we find that an original camera negative has been cut for censorship, it’s gutting, because rarely are those cuts saved. If they’re cutting the [negative], then for whatever reason the producers decided that this was the version they wanted to survive into the future. With 1980s films, it was often because the censorship climate changed, favouring less violence and gore as the decade went on."

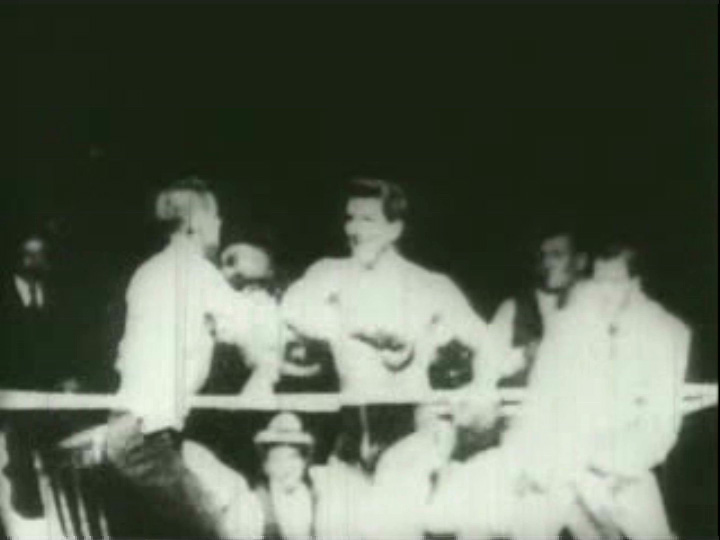
Surviving footage from Corbett and Courtney Before the Kinetograph, a short film of an 1894 boxing match

== Silent films ==
=== 1890s ===
Year	Film	Director	Cast	Notes	Ref.
1894	Leonard–Cushing Fight	W. K. L. Dickson	Mike Leonard, Jack Cushing	A 37 second long piece of fragment remains of a round.	
1894	Corbett and Courtney Before the Kinetograph	W. K. L. Dickson, William Heise	James J. Corbett, Peter Courtney	An exhibition fight filmed in the Edison Black Maria studio in 1894. Originally six one-minute rounds were filmed and shown on individual Kinetoscopes. Only two rounds survive.	
1896	Le Coucher de la Mariée	Léar (Albert Kirchner)		One of the first erotic films (or "stag party films") made. Only two minutes of the film have survived.	
1897	The Corbett–Fitzsimmons Fight	Enoch J. Rector	James J. Corbett, Bob Fitzsimmons	A fight film shot outdoors in a widescreen process. Originally over 70 minutes, a 20-minute fragment survives.	
1899	The Jeffries-Sharkey Contest	William A. Brady, Tom O'Rourke	Jim Jeffries, Tom Sharkey	American Mutoscope and Biograph film of 25-round heavyweight championship bout, 135 minutes in length. First film shot in artificial light, which was so hot that it singed the boxers' hair. A few minutes of degraded footage exists of this fight.	

=== 1900s ===
Year	Film	Director	Cast	Notes	Ref.
1903	Alice in Wonderland	Cecil Hepworth, Percy Stow	May Clark	The first film adaption of Lewis Carroll's book originally ran about 12 minutes, according to the British Film Institute. The Institute's restoration is nine minutes and 35 seconds long.	
1905	Adventures of Sherlock Holmes	J. Stuart Blackton	H. Kyrle Bellew, J. Barney Sherry	First dramatic Sherlock Holmes adaptation on film and second overall Holmes film, the first one being the 30-second film Sherlock Holmes Baffled (1900). All that exists are short strips of scenes deposited for copyright purposes in the Library of Congress.	
1906	The Story of the Kelly Gang	Charles Tait	Frank Mills	Only 17 minutes of this 70-minute feature survive; it is often considered to be the world's first feature-length motion picture. It was thought to be a lost film until fragments were found in 1976, with further fragments in 1978, 1980 and 2006.	
1908	A Grandmother's Story	Georges Méliès	André Méliès (Georges' seven-year-old son)	Fragments of this short film are known to survive; some scenes in the middle of the film are presumed lost.	

=== 1910s ===
Year	Film	Director	Cast	Notes	Ref.
1911	At a Quarter of Two	Thomas H. Ince?	Mary Pickford, King Baggot	Fragments in the Library of Congress have been identified as being from this film.	
1911	Fighting Blood	D. W. Griffith	George Nichols, Robert Harron	The only available print is "missing much of the climactic battle scene".	
1911	Their First Misunderstanding	Thomas H. Ince, George Loane Tucker	Mary Pickford, Owen Moore	A one-reel short. The majority of the film was recovered in 2006, but the first minute or so remains missing.	
1911	A Victim of the Mormons	August Blom	Valdemar Psilander, Clara Pontoppidan	Danish film that initiated a decade of anti-Mormon propaganda films in America. Only about half of the 60-minute feature has been found, a copy of which is preserved at the LDS archive in Salt Lake City.	
1912	With Our King and Queen Through India			British documentary depicting celebrations in India for the coronation of George V. With a total running time of around 150 minutes, today only two reels survive, one showing a review of troops after the main ceremony and the other a procession in Calcutta from the end of the royal tour.	
1913	The Adventures of Kathlyn	Francis J. Grandon	Kathlyn Williams	La Cineteca del Friuli film archive has the first of 13 episodes of the second American serial ever made. The EYE Film Institute Netherlands also has print fragments.	
1913	The Inside of the White Slave Traffic	Frank Beal	Edwin Carewe, Jean Thomas	Two reels of this four-reel drama have survived.	
1913	Poor Jake's Demise	Allen Curtis	Max Asher, Lon Chaney	A fragment of the film was discovered in England in May 2006 and is in the possession of Lobster Films.	
1913	Raja Harishchandra	Dadasaheb Phalke	D. D. Dabke, Anna Salunke	The first Indian feature film. The National Film Archive of India has two reels containing the first and last of four parts of the work.	
1913	Who Will Marry Mary?		Mary Fuller, Ben F. Wilson	Incomplete prints of episodes one and five (of six) survive, in the EYE Film Instituut Nederland archive and at Keene State College, respectively.	
1914	Dolly of the Dailies	Walter Edwin	Mary Fuller, Yale Boss	Chapter five of this 12-part serial was discovered in 2009 in the New Zealand Film Archive. The BFI National Archive has chapter 10.	
1914	The Battle of the Sexes	D. W. Griffith	Lillian Gish, Donald Crisp	Griffith's second feature, and his first released for Reliance-Majestic. Only a two-minute fragment survives.	
1914	The Girl Stage Driver	Webster Cullison	Norbert A. Myles, Edna Payne, Will E. Sheerer	An incomplete 35mm positive print was discovered in 2009 in the New Zealand Film Archive.	
1914	A Good Little Devil	Edwin S. Porter	Mary Pickford	One of five reels survives in the National Film and Television Archive.	
1914	The Last Egyptian	J. Farrell MacDonald	J. Farrell MacDonald, Howard Davies, J. Charles Haydon, Vivian Reed	Three of the film's five reels are housed in the Museum of Modern Art.	
1914	Ireland a Nation	Walter MacNamara	Barry O'Brien	Four of five reels survive.	
1914– 1917	The Hazards of Helen	J. P. McGowan, James Davis	Helen Holmes	This is believed to be the longest serial ever made, 23.8 hours long with 119 12-minute episodes. Surviving episodes are scattered among various film archives, including the Library of Congress, the National Film and Television Archive and the International Museum of Photography and Film at George Eastman House.	
1914	The Indian Wars Refought	Theodore Wharton	William F. Cody	Cody stars as himself in this early movie version of the Indian Wars; also stars Nelson Appleton Miles and Black Elk; released 1917. One minute and 58 seconds of footage is held by the McCracken Research Library or the Buffalo Bill Historical Center, and can be viewed online (see reference).	
1914	Lucille Love, Girl of Mystery	Francis Ford	Grace Cunard, Francis Ford	Four of 15 episodes survive.	
1914	The Master Key	Robert Z. Leonard	Robert Z. Leonard, Ella Hall, Harry Carter	Episode five of 15 resides in the Library of Congress.	
1914	My Official Wife	James Young	Clara Kimball Young	The story concerns Helen Marie, a woman on the run from the St. Petersburg police, who plots to assassinate the Tsar. Only about 45 seconds of this film exists. These fragments contain an extra mistakenly said to be Leon Trotsky. In fact, Trotsky was not yet in the United States when this was filmed.	
1914	Neptune's Daughter	Herbert Brenon	Annette Kellerman	The Gosfilmofond film archive possesses one reel, which Australia's National Film and Sound Archive copied.	
1914	The Perils of Pauline	George B. Seitz	Pearl White	Of the original 20-chapter serial running 410 minutes, only a 90-minute version, released in Europe in 1916, is known to exist.	
1915	The Battle Cry of Peace	J. Stuart Blackton	Charles Richman, L. Rogers Lytton, Mary Maurice	Pro-armaments epic and the most expensive production undertaken by Vitagraph. One reel reported in Europe; fragments of battle scenes, culled from stock shot libraries, reside at George Eastman House.	
1915	The Carpet from Bagdad	Colin Campbell	Kathlyn Williams, Wheeler Oakman, Guy Oliver	One reel of five was salvaged from the wreck of the RMS Lusitania with a few feet of recoverable images.	
1915	The Millionaire Paupers	Joe De Grasse	Lon Chaney	Only a fragment of the film survives.	
1916	La falena	Carmine Gallone	Lyda Borelli	The Cineteca Italiana film archive possesses a fragmentary print.	
1916	The Fall of a Nation	Thomas Dixon	Lorraine Huling	A few frames survive of this sequel to The Birth of a Nation (1915).	
1916	Intolerance	D. W. Griffith	Lillian Gish, Mae Marsh, Robert Harron, Constance Talmadge	Still frames from several scenes have survived and were incorporated into the print compiled by the Museum of Modern Art in New York. These scenes were probably part of the original cut of the film, but eliminated by Griffith in subsequent reissues.	
1916	The Iron Claw	George B. Seitz, Edward José	Pearl White, Creighton Hale	The UCLA Film and Television Archive possesses episode seven of this 20-part serial.	
1916	Kiss of Death	Victor Sjöström	Victor Sjöström	The Cinémathèque française film archive has approximately 30 minutes of the film.	
1916	The Moment Before	Robert G. Vignola	Pauline Frederick	A nearly complete print, lacking only the opening scene, is in the possession of the Cineteca Nazionale film archive in Rome.	
1916	The Place Beyond the Winds	Joe De Grasse	Lon Chaney	Four of the five reels are in the film archive of the Library of Congress.	
1916	Ramona	Donald Crisp	Adda Gleason, Mabel Van Buren	The Library of Congress has reel five.	
1916	Snow White	J. Searle Dawley	Marguerite Clark, Creighton Hale	It was considered a lost film, thought to have been destroyed in a vault fire. A "substantially complete" print with Dutch intertitles, missing a few scenes, was found in Amsterdam in 1992 and restored at George Eastman House.	
1916	The Wings	Mauritz Stiller	Egil Eide, Lars Hanson	A copy of the central section surfaced in 1987 and was shown by the Swedish Film Institute.	
1916	The Woman in the Case	Hugh Ford	Pauline Frederick, Alan Hale Sr.	The first four of five reels survive in the Nederlands Filmarchives.	
1917	Cleopatra	J. Gordon Edwards	Theda Bara	Only approximately 20 seconds was originally believed to exist, until around 40 additional seconds were discovered in 2023.	
1917	The Devil-Stone	Cecil B. DeMille	Geraldine Farrar	Two reels of this six-reel feature film, originally with Handschiegl Color Process sequences, are in the AFI Collection of the Library of Congress.	
1917	The Gulf Between	Wray Physioc	Grace Darmond, Niles Welch	Of the first Technicolor film, "very short fragments survive at the Margaret Herrick Library, George Eastman House and the Smithsonian National Museum of American History Photography Dept."	
1917	The Moth	Edward José	Norma Talmadge, Eugene O'Brien, Hassard Short	The Library of Congress has reels one to four (of six).	
1917	Nuts in May	Robin Williamson	Stan Laurel	Only 60 seconds of footage remain of Laurel's first film. Part of the short lives on in scenes inserted into the 1922 extant short Mixed Nuts.	
1917	Poppy	Edward José	Norma Talmadge, Eugene O'Brien, Frederick Perry	A two-reel condensation of the second half of the film survives in the Library of Congress.	
1917	The Red Ace	Jacques Jaccard	Marie Walcamp	Originally a 16-episode serial, only episode seven survives in the film archive of the Library of Congress.	
1917	The Secret Man	John Ford	Harry Carey	Two of the five reels are in the Library of Congress film archive.	
1917	The Seven Pearls	Louis J. Gasnier, Donald MacKenzie	Mollie King, Creighton Hale	Fragmentary prints of this serial are held by the Library of Congress. (Public Archives of Canada/Dawson City collection).	
1917	The Sin Woman		Irene Fenwick	A trailer survives in the National Film and Sound Archive and the Academy Film Archive.	
1917	Triumph	Joe De Grasse	Lon Chaney	Three of the five reels survive.	
1918	The Cook	Roscoe Arbuckle	Roscoe Arbuckle, Buster Keaton	Two prints were found of this previously lost comedy short, one in 1998 and one in 2002, and were combined to create a restored version. However, some scenes are still missing.	
1918	The Ghost of Slumber Mountain	Willis O'Brien	Herbert M. Dawley, Willis O'Brien	Only 19 minutes survive.	
1918	The Ghosts of Yesterday	Charles Miller	Norma Talmadge, Eugene O'Brien, Stuart Holmes	Reels one to four (of six) and a fragment of the last reel are in the possession of the Library of Congress.	
1918	Hands Up	Louis J. Gasnier, James W. Horne	Ruth Roland, George Larkin	Only a "promotional short film" of this 15-part serial remains, in the UCLA Film and Television Archive.	
1918	He Comes Up Smiling	Allan Dwan	Douglas Fairbanks	Only one reel survive from this five reeler. The surviving reel was preserved by the Academy Film Archive in 2010.	
1918	The House of Hate	George B. Seitz	Pearl White, Antonio Moreno	An incomplete print of this 20-part serial is in the Gosfilmofond film archive with Russian and/or Ukrainian subtitles.	
1918	Oorlog en vrede	Maurits Binger		Only a single fragment of this Dutch World War I film survives.	
1918	Riddle Gawne	William S. Hart, Lambert Hillyer	Lon Chaney	One of the five reels is in the film archive of the Library of Congress.	
1918	Salomé	J. Gordon Edwards	Theda Bara	A short, two-minute fragment consisting of clips from the film, surfaced in 2021 at the Filmoteca Española (Spanish Film Archive) in Madrid.	
1918	The Soul of Buddha	J.Gordon Edwards	Theda Bara	Screenplay written by Bara. A short 23 second fragment surfaced in 2025 in the documentary Theda Bara et William Fox (2001).	
1918	When a Woman Sins	J. Gordon Edwards	Theda Bara	In 2019, 23 seconds worth of surviving footage was rediscovered.	
1919	The Black Secret	George B. Seitz	Pearl White, Walter McGrail	Widely thought to be lost. On 9 July 2021, a YouTube channel based in the UK released a two minute clip of the film.	
1919	Bound and Gagged	George B. Seitz	Marguerite Courtot, George B. Seitz	Four of the 10 episodes of this spoof serial survive in the Library of Congress film archive.	
1919	The Coming of the Law	Arthur Rosson	Tom Mix, Agnes Vernon, George Nichols	One reel survives in the Library of Congress.	
1919	The Exquisite Thief	Tod Browning	Priscilla Dean, Thurston Hall, Milton Ross, Sam De Grasse, Jean Calhoun	One out of six reels of this film exists, which was recovered from the Dawson Film Find.	
1919	Fighting For Gold	Edward LeSaint	Tom Ford, Teddy Sampson, Sid Jordan	incomplete print survives in private collection	
1919	A Gun Fightin' Gentleman	John Ford	Harry Carey, John Ford	Only three reels of originally five or six are believed to have survived.	
1919	J'accuse	Abel Gance	Séverin-Mars	The original film was in four episodes with a film length of 5,250 metres (17,220 ft). The most complete reconstruction is 3,525 metres (11,565 ft) long.	
1919	Juan Sin Ropa	Georges Benoît	Camila Quiroga, Héctor G. Quiroga, José de Ángel, Julio Escarsela and Alfredo Carrizo	The only surviving copy of the film was preserved in fragmentary form and without intertitles, lasting only 25 minutes.	
1919	Just Squaw	George E. Middleton	Beatriz Michelena	The Library of Congress has four of five reels.	
1919	Der Knabe in blau (The Boy in Blue)	F. W. Murnau	Blandine Ebinger	Murnau's debut film. The Deutsche Kinemathek film archive possesses 35 small fragments ranging from two to 11 frames in length.	
1919	The Masked Rider	Aubrey M. Kennedy	Boris Karloff, Ruth Stonehouse	The serial was considered to be lost in its entirety. However, most episodes have been found, although many are incomplete. The Masked Rider is considered to be the first film serial about a masked cowboy.	
1919	The Miracle Man	George Loane Tucker	Thomas Meighan, Lon Chaney	About three minutes survive, including two clips in compilation films released by Paramount: The House That Shadows Built (1931) and Movie Memories (1935).	
1919	The New Moon	Chester Withey	Norma Talmadge	Reel six (of six) is missing from the Library of Congress	
1919	Ravished Armenia	Oscar Apfel	Aurora Mardiganian	A 24-minute segment was restored and edited from a surviving reel in Soviet Armenia. It was released in 2009 by the Armenian Genocide Resource Center of Northern California. Also known as Auction of Souls.	
1919	Rough Riding Romance	Arthur Rosson	Tom Mix	One reel of excerpts (500 ft) survives.	
1919	The Tiger's Trail	Robert Ellis, Louis J. Gasnier, Paul Hurst	Ruth Roland, George Larkin	A "fragmentary print" of the 15-episode serial exists.	
1919	The Toilers	Tom Watts	Manora Thew, George Dewhurst, Gwynne Herbert, Ronald Colman, Eric Barker	Two of five reels survive.	
1919	Treat 'Em Rough	Lynn Reynolds	Tom Mix, Jane Novak	Two reels are known to survive at George Eastman House.	

=== 1920s ===
Year	Film	Director	Cast	Notes	Ref.
1920	Along the Moonbeam Trail	Herbert M. Dawley	Herbert M. Dawley	Considered lost until half of it was discovered in the attic of the Chatham Community Players Theatre in New Jersey. More footage was obtained from Jack Sullivan, whose father had saved part of the film when the theatre was being renovated. Additional footage was obtained from the British Film Institute, including a nitrate print of the last half recovered with Dawley’s memorabilia. In total, the 2016 DVD used five different partial prints obtained from those three sources. The finale is still missing, but went as follows: The two boys hide in the cave, frightened by the battle between the giant prehistoric monsters. One of the crying boys rubs his eyes with the “ring of protection” that Queen Mab gave them. He wishes them home, and they awake safe and sound in their own beds after having had a great and wonderful adventure.	
1920	Daredevil Jack	W. S. Van Dyke	Jack Dempsey, Josie Sedgwick	Episodes one to four and one unidentified one of the 15 episodes of this adventure serial are in the UCLA Film & Television Archive.	
1920	La Fête espagnole	Germaine Dulac	Ève Francis, Gaston Modot	Only eight minutes of this 67-minute feature, which Henri Langlois cited "as important as Eisenstein's Strike", survive at the Cinemathèque Française.	
1920	Robbery Under Arms	Kenneth Brampton	Kenneth Brampton, S. A. Fitzgerald	A copy containing about three fourths of this Australian production was found and combined with already known footage to produce a near-complete version. A five-minute sequence is still missing.	
1920	She Loves and Lies	Chester Withey	Norma Talmadge	An incomplete surviving print is preserved in the Library of Congress collection.	
1920	The Symbol of the Unconquered	Oscar Micheaux	Iris Hall	Thought to be lost, an incomplete print was discovered in the Belgian Film Archives; it is missing sequences from the final reel showing the defeat of the villainous Klansmen.	
1920	The Third Eye	James W. Horne	Warner Oland, Eileen Percy	A "fragmentary print" survives.	
1921	The Adventures of Tarzan	Robert F. Hill	Elmo Lincoln, Louise Lorraine	Originally released as a 15-chapter movie serial, only the 10-chapter 1928 re-release remains.	
1921	The Blue Fox	Duke Worne	Ann Little	The UCLA Film and Television Archive has chapters 1–12 in its collection; episodes 13–15 are believed to be lost.	
1921	Cappy Ricks	Tom Forman	Thomas Meighan, Agnes Ayres, John St. Polis	Two reels of footage have been preserved by the UCLA Film and Television Archive.	
1921	The Centaurs	Winsor McCay		Ninety seconds of footage of this animated film survives.	
1921	A Connecticut Yankee in King Arthur's Court	Emmett J. Flynn, Pauline Starke	Harry Myers	According to silentera.com, reels two, four and seven remain of the original eight.	
1921	Daniel		Sarah Bernhardt	A five-minute fragment is housed in the WPA Film Library and the British Pathé film archive. The latter allows a clip of the final scene to be viewed online.	
1921	Devil Dog Dawson	Jack Hoxie	Jack Hoxie, Helene Rosson, Evelyn Selbie	Thirty-eight seconds of footage from this Western, found in a mislabeled tin, were the subject of an investigation in a 2006 episode of the PBS series History Detectives.	
1921	Disraeli	Henry Kolker	George Arliss	The entire film was screened at the Museum of Modern Art in 1947. Reel three is held at George Eastman House. Complete prints are reputedly held at the Gosfilmofond in Moscow and Cinematheque Royale de Belgique in Brussels.	
1921	How Kitchener Was Betrayed	Percy Nash	Fred Paul, Winifred Evans, Bertram Berleigh	Only one of its six reels is known to survive.	
1921	The Mechanical Man	Andre Deed	Gabriel Moreau, Valentina Frascaroli, Fernando Vivas-May	Originally around an hour long, only about 26 minutes remain.	
1921	The Queen of Sheba	J. Gordon Edwards	Betty Blythe	Seventeen seconds of footage has tentatively been identified as being from this film.	
1921	The White Horseman	Albert Russell	Art Acord, Eva Forrestor	A "handful of print clippings" remain of this Western serial.	
1922	Anna Ascends	Victor Fleming	Alice Brady, Robert Ellis	A six-minute fragment of the film remains.	
1922	A Dangerous Adventure	Sam Warner, Jack Warner	Grace Darmond, Philo McCullough, Derelys Perdue, Mabel Stark	The UCLA Film and Television Archive has all except episode 12 of this 15-chapter serial.	
1922	Daydreams	Buster Keaton	Buster Keaton, Renée Adorée, Joe Roberts	Incomplete prints survive from the Raymond Rohauer Collection, currently scenes featuring Keaton working as a surgeon and a Wall Street stock broker are still missing from extant prints.	
1922	The Eternal Flame	Frank Lloyd	Norma Talmadge, Adolphe Menjou, Wedgwood Nowell	Reels three and eight (of eight) are missing from the Library of Congress.	
1922	The Loves of Pharaoh	Ernst Lubitsch	Emil Jannings	Long thought lost completely, it has been restored from various sources, but still lacks 10 minutes of the original running time of roughly one hour and 50 minutes.	
1922	Marizza	F. W. Murnau	Tzwetta Tzatschewa	The Cineteca Nazionale film archive possesses a fragmentary print of the first reel.	
1922	The Ninety and Nine	David Smith	Colleen Moore	A ten minute Pathescope cutdown version on 9.5mm originally intended for home movie use was discovered in the USC Hugh M. Hefner Moving Image Archive.	
1922	Polly of the Follies	John Emerson	Constance Talmadge	Only a trailer is known to have survived.	
1922	Sherlock Holmes	Albert Parker	John Barrymore	Once thought lost. A jumble of negative takes were rediscovered in the 1970s and the film was reconstructed in 1975 and again in 2001.	
1922	The Timber Queen	Fred Jackman	Ruth Roland, Bruce Gordon	The UCLA Film and Television Archive has episodes one, four, eight and nine of 15, as does a private collection.	
1922	The Toll of the Sea	Chester M. Franklin	Anna May Wong, Kenneth Harlan	The UCLA Film and Television Archive, under the supervision of Robert Gitt and Richard Dayton, restored the film from the 35mm, nitrate film original camera negative in 1985. As the final two reels were missing, Gitt and Dayton used "an original two-color Technicolor camera" to shoot a sunset on a California beach, "much as the film's original closing must have looked."	
1922	The Village Blacksmith	John Ford	Will Walling, Virginia True Boardman	One of the eight reels survives in the UCLA Film and Television Archive.	
1922	The Young Rajah	Phil Rosen	Rudolph Valentino	An incomplete 16mm reduction positive, missing the first third, resides in the Library of Moving Images. Turner Classic Movies financed a restoration using surviving footage from the film, and trailers, still photos and title cards to bridge the gaps.	
1923	Always Tell Your Wife	Hugh Croise, Alfred Hitchcock (uncredited), Seymour Hicks (uncredited)	Seymour Hicks, Gertrude McCoy	Only one of the two reels is known to survive.	
1923	In the Days of Daniel Boone	William James Craft	Charles Brinley, Jack Mower	The trailer of this 15-episode Western serial is available on the DVD More Treasures from American Film Archives, 1894–1931: 50 Films.	
1923	The Gold Diggers	Harry Beaumont	Hope Hampton, Wyndham Standing, Louise Fazenda	An incomplete Belgian print was found by a film collector in Mansfield, England in May 2021. The surviving footage includes reels 1, 4, 5, and 6, although some of the extant reels have missing sections at the beginning and end of the reels.	
1923	Flaming Youth	John Francis Dillon	Colleen Moore	Only one reel and a film trailer exist.	
1923	Maytime	Louis J. Gasnier	Ethel Shannon, Harrison Ford	Four of seven reels survive of this rediscovered film. It includes one of Clara Bow's earliest film roles.	
1923	La Roue	Abel Gance	Séverin-Mars	The original version encompassed 32 reels, which ran for either seven and a half or nine hours (sources disagree). In 1924, Gance edited it down to two and a half hours for general distribution. A modern reconstruction from five different versions, available on DVD, is nearly four and a half hours long.	
1923	The White Shadow	Graham Cutts	Betty Compson	Alfred Hitchcock received his first screen credit, as a writer and assistant director. Three of the six reels were found in New Zealand in August 2011.	
1923	The Darling of New York	King Baggot	Baby Peggy	One of the popular "Baby Peggy" movies. Only the last reel showing the fire exists. It has been restored by the UCLA Film and Television Archive.	
1923	The Eternal City	George Fitzmaurice	Lionel Barrymore, Barbara La Marr, Bert Lytell	The final two reels out of eight survive.	
1924	The Dramatic Life of Abraham Lincoln	Phil Rosen	George A. Billings	Incomplete prints of the film, including some color-tinted and color-toned footage, exist in various film archives, including the National Film and Sound Archive and the Library of Congress.	
1924	Fast and Fearless	Richard Thorpe	Buffalo Bill, Jr., Jean Arthur	Reel two (of five) is in the Library of Congress.	
1924	The Fast Express	William Duncan	William Duncan, Edith Johnson	A fragmentary print of this 15-episode serial exists.	
1924	Greed	Erich von Stroheim		Initially running nine and a half hours, the film was cut by von Stroheim to just under four hours, and then trimmed by the studio to 140 minutes of surviving footage. The remaining footage was later accidentally discarded by a janitor while cleaning the vaults. A 240-minute version has been edited in 1999, including slides of the few stills from some of the lost scenes.	
1924	Monsieur Don't Care	Joe Rock	Stan Laurel	A few minutes' fragment was uncovered in 2016 and posted to the internet.	
1924	Reveille	George Pearson	Betty Balfour, Stewart Rome, Ralph Forbes	Among the BFI 75 Most Wanted. At least some sequences are known to survive in private hands.	
1924	A Sainted Devil	Joseph Henabery	Rudolph Valentino, Nita Naldi	Fragments making up less than one reel have survived.	
1924	A Self-Made Failure	William Beaudine	Lloyd Hamilton, Ben Alexander, Matt Moore	One of the longest feature comedies up to that time. Only a trailer survives, at the Library of Congress.	
1924	Through the Dark	George W. Hill	Forrest Stanley, Colleen Moore	The last two reels, seven and eight, are missing.	
1924	The Wife of the Centaur	King Vidor	Eleanor Boardman, John Gilbert	Four seconds of Boardman can be seen in the MGM promotional short Twenty Years After.	
1925	The Air Mail	Irvin Willat	Warner Baxter, Billie Dove, Douglas Fairbanks, Jr.	Only four of eight reels survive in the Library of Congress.	
1925	Araki Mataemon (荒木又右衛門)	Tomiyasu Ikeda	Matsunosuke Onoe	The whereabouts of the film were unknown after its initial screening, but an abridged version made for home projectors was discovered in 2008.	
1925	Body and Soul	Oscar Micheaux	Paul Robeson	Originally running nine reels, it was cut to five reels to gain approval from New York censors. The surviving copy is based on the censor-approved, edited version; the original nine-reel version is considered lost.	
1925	The Bonehead Age			13 seconds were featured in the documentary Dinosaur Movies (1993).	
1925	Confessions of a Queen	Victor Sjöström	Alice Terry, John Bowers, Lewis Stone	Originally running five reels (64 minutes), the last reel has never been found.	
1925	Graustark	Dimitri Buchowetzki	Norma Talmadge	The Library of Congress lacks reels one and three (of seven).	
1925	The Lady	Frank Borzage	Norma Talmadge, Wallace MacDonald, Brandon Hurst	Reel two (of eight) is missing from the Library of Congress archive.	
1925	The Lost World	Harry Hoyt	Wallace Beery, Bessie Love, Lloyd Hughes, Lewis Stone	It initially had a running time of 106 minutes. Though partially restored, the longest cut runs at approximately 100 minutes. [However, according to silentera.com, the 2017 Flicker Alley Blu-ray edition runs 110 minutes and "includes approximately eight minutes of recently-recovered footage."]	
1925	A Lover's Oath	Ferdinand P. Earle	Ramon Novarro, Kathleen Key	The Academy Film Archive preserved a short segment (around 30 seconds) in 2009. Another segment (around 2 minutes, 45 seconds), purportedly from the Academy Film Archive, can be viewed on YouTube.	
1925	Madame Sans-Gêne	Léonce Perret	Gloria Swanson	The theatrical trailer is extant and can be viewed on YouTube.	
1926	The American Venus	Frank Tuttle	Esther Ralston, Louise Brooks	Two trailers and a short color clip are held by the Library of Congress.	
1926	Bardelys the Magnificent	King Vidor	John Gilbert, Eleanor Boardman	Long thought to have been lost, a nearly complete print was found. It is missing reel three.	
1926	Camille	Fred Niblo	Norma Talmadge	An incomplete 35mm positive print exists in the Raymond Rohauer collection of the Cohen Media Group.	
1926	The Great Gatsby	Herbert Brenon	Warner Baxter, Lois Wilson	A one-minute trailer exists.	
1926	Just Another Blonde	Alfred Santell	Dorothy Mackaill, Louise Brooks	The UCLA Film and Television Archive possesses a fragmentary 20 minutes of this film.	
1926	Mademoiselle from Armentieres	Maurice Elvey	Estelle Brody, John Stuart	The BFI National Archive possesses fragments amounting to about a third of the film (2,850 of 7,900 ft).	
1926	A Page of Madness	Teinosuke Kinugasa	Masao Inoue, Yoshie Nakagawa	Found by the director in his garden shed in 1970; he had buried it during World War II and forgotten it, but a third of the original footage is still missing.	
1926	The Silent Flyer	William James Craft	Silver Streak, Malcolm McGregor, Louise Lorraine	Produced by Samuel Bischoff and Nat Levine. The trailer survives in the UCLA Film and Television Archive and is available on the DVD More Treasures from American Film Archives, 1894–1931: 50 Films.	
1926	The Song and Dance Man	Herbert Brenon	Tom Moore, Bessie Love	Reels three to seven survive in the Library of Congress.	
1926	Stop, Look and Listen	Larry Semon	Larry Semon	Final reel found in Japan by Toshihiko Sasayama of Waseda University, and identified by film historian Junko Iio.	
1927	The Battle of the Century	Clyde Bruckman	Laurel and Hardy	For decades, the excerpt included in the 1957 compilation film The Golden Age of Comedy was thought to be the only remaining footage, until an incomplete print of the first reel (featuring a boxing match) was found in the late 1970s. Scenes featuring Eugene Pallette, and a final, climactic gag showing a cop receiving a pie in the face, were missing until the second reel was discovered in a private collection in June 2015. Two minutes of the film featuring a scene between the duo and Pallette from the end of reel one is still missing.	
1927	Cradle Snatchers	Howard Hawks	Louise Fazenda, Dorothy Phillips; Ethel Wales	Rediscovered by Peter Bogdanovich in the 1970s at the Fox vault, it is still missing half of reel three and all of reel four.	
1927	The Dove	Roland West	Norma Talmadge	Of the nine reels, the Library of Congress has reels one, three, four and eight.	
1927	Ein Rückblic in die Urwelt			48 seconds were featured in the documentary Dinosaur Movies (1993).	
1927	The Enemy	Fred Niblo	Lillian Gish	The MGM film library is in possession of a print lacking the last reel.	
1927	For the Term of His Natural Life	Norman Dawn	George Fisher, Eva Novak, Dunstan Webb	This Australian film was reconstructed from incomplete Australian and American prints and other sources. The remaining gaps were covered by new titles and montages of stills.	
1927	Get Your Man	Dorothy Arzner	Clara Bow, Charles "Buddy" Rogers, Josef Swickard	Reels 2 and 3 (of 6 total) are lost.	
1927	Isle of Sunken Gold	Harry S. Webb	Anita Stewart, Duke Kahanamoku	Chapters four to six and reel one of chapter seven have been found and are held by Collectie Filmcollectief in the Netherlands.	
1927	King of the Jungle	Webster Cullison	Elmo Lincoln, Sally Long	Only the trailer of this 10-episode serial survives.	
1927	Metropolis	Fritz Lang	Alfred Abel, Brigitte Helm	About a quarter of the film was believed to have been lost forever prior to 2008, when an almost-complete print was discovered in Argentina. All but five minutes of the film is now intact and restored, using both this print and a second one from New Zealand. Intertitle cards were inserted to describe the scenes represented by the missing footage, which was damaged beyond repair. In addition, the Argentine print was created using a slightly different aspect ratio from the master copy.	
1927	Napoléon	Abel Gance	Albert Dieudonné	Gance's film was released in a number of versions with a wide range of running times, up to nine hours and 22 minutes for the version définitive. The latest reconstruction by Georges Mourier runs seven hours and five minutes	
1927	Now I'll Tell One	James Parrott	Laurel and Hardy	The first reel of this Charley Chase comedy is missing. Both Stan Laurel and Oliver Hardy appear, although not yet as a team.	
1927	Now We're in the Air	Frank R. Strayer	Wallace Beery, Raymond Hatton, Louise Brooks	A complete print was found in 2016 in a Czech archive. It was badly decomposed, however, and only about 23 minutes of the film could be restored.	
1927	The Private Life of Helen of Troy	Alexander Korda	María Corda	One reel of the Academy Award-nominated film exists in the British Film Institute.	
1927	The Return of the Riddle Rider	Robert F. Hill	William Desmond, Lola Todd	A trailer remains of this 10-part serial.	
1927	Rough House Rosie	Frank R. Strayer	Clara Bow, Reed Howes	A 54-second trailer survives.	
1927	The Way of All Flesh	Victor Fleming	Emil Jannings	The only "lost" Academy Award-winning performance (Jannings). Two fragments, totaling about seven minutes, have been recovered.	
1927	Whispering Smith Rides	Ray Taylor	Wallace MacDonald, Rose Blossom	A trailer for this 10-part serial survives.	
1928	The Adorable Outcast	Norman Dawn	Edith Roberts, Edmund Burns, Walter Long	Fifteen minutes of the film are in the possession of Australia's National Film and Sound Archive.	
1928	The Arcadians	Victor Saville	Ben Blue, Jeanne De Casalis, Vesta Sylva	Part of the BFI 75 Most Wanted missing films. The British Film Institute has noted, however, that an "incomplete and deteriorating nitrate print ... was apparently viewed prior to July 2008".	
1928	Beware of Married Men	Archie Mayo	Irene Rich, Clyde Cook, Myrna Loy	One reel was found in the UCLA Film and Television Archive.	
1928	Beau Sabreur	John Waters	Gary Cooper; Evelyn Brent	It is believed that only a trailer survives. It is included in the DVD More Treasures from American Film Archives, 1894–1931.	
1928	The Divine Woman	Victor Sjöström	Greta Garbo	One reel was found in a Russian film archive and has been shown on Turner Classic Movies. Another short excerpt was found in a Swedish newsreel and has been shown at Filmhuset in Sweden.	
1928	A Final Reckoning	Ray Taylor	Newton House, Louise Lorraine	There is a trailer of this 12-episode serial.	
1928	The Garden of Eden	Lewis Milestone	Corinne Griffith	A Technicolor dream sequence has been lost.	
1928	Happiness Ahead	William A. Seiter	Colleen Moore, Edmund Lowe	Only a trailer survives.	
1928	How to Handle Women	William James Craft	Glenn Tryon	Includes a bit part by Bela Lugosi, and the only known screen appearance by George Herriman, the creator of the comic strip Krazy Kat. The Library of Congress has a "digital file containing 300 ft. 16mm fragment from one reel (r1) loaned by collector".	
1928	Manhattan Cocktail	Dorothy Arzner	Nancy Carroll	A one-minute montage sequence, "Skyline Dance" by Slavko Vorkapich, was released in October 2005 in the DVD collection Unseen Cinema: Early American Avant Garde Film 1894-1941.	
1928	The Man Without a Face	Spencer Gordon Bennet	Allene Ray, Walter Miller	A fragmentary print of this 10-part serial exists.	
1928	Red Hair	Clarence G. Badger	Clara Bow, Lane Chandler	A part-color silent movie. The UCLA Film and Television Archive has fragments which were shown in the 2004 UCLA Festival of Preservation.	
1928	Sadie Thompson	Raoul Walsh	Gloria Swanson, Lionel Barrymore	The final reel (approximately 10 minutes) is missing. Most of the film survives in good condition and has been released on DVD.	
1928	Say It with Sables	Frank Capra	Francis X. Bushman, Helene Chadwick, Margaret Livingston	A trailer exists.	
1928	Spione	Fritz Lang	Rudolf Klein-Rogge, Gerda Maurus	No original negatives survive. A 143 minute restoration of the 178 minute original was completed in 2004.	
1928	The Terrible People	Spencer Gordon Bennet	Allene Ray, Walter Miller	A "fragmentary print" of this serial is said to exist.	
1928	Three Week-Ends	Clarence G. Badger	Clara Bow	The UCLA Film & Television Archive has fragments which were shown in the 2004 UCLA Festival of Preservation.	
1928	The Wedding March	Erich von Stroheim	Erich von Stroheim, Fay Wray	Stroheim's first rough cut was 11 hours long. He intended to turn it into a two-part film, with the second part to be called The Honeymoon. The Honeymoon is presumed lost.	
1929	The Case of Lena Smith	Josef von Sternberg	Esther Ralston	A four-minute segment was shown at the 2003 Pordenone Silent Film Festival.	
1929	Strong Boy	John Ford	Victor McLaglen, Leatrice Joy	The New Zealand Film Archive has a theatrical trailer, and there may be a print in Australia, according to silentera.com.	
1929	Thunder	William Nigh	Lon Chaney	Chaney's last silent film. According to silentera.com, half a reel survives.	

== Sound films ==
=== 1920s ===
Year	Film	Director	Cast	Notes	Ref.
1926	Till the Bells Ring	Graham Moffat	Graham Moffat, Maggie Moffat, Winifred Moffat	Possibly the first feature-length talking film. The second of four reels is lost.	
1928	Melody of Love	Arch Heath	Walter Pidgeon, Mildred Harris	Universal's first all-talkie. According to silentera.com, an incomplete print exists.	
1928	My Man	Archie Mayo	Fanny Brice	Reels one, two and 11 of this part-talkie survive, as do an almost complete set of soundtrack discs and the soundtrack of the trailer.	
1928	Noah's Ark	Michael Curtiz	Dolores Costello, George O'Brien	After the premiere of this part-talkie, Warner Bros. made extensive revisions, including cutting about half an hour. The original 135-minute version is believed to be lost. A partial restoration is 108 minutes long.	
1928	On Trial	Archie Mayo	Pauline Frederick, Bert Lytell, Lois Wilson	A trailer and the Vitaphone soundtrack survive.	
1928	The Patriot	Ernst Lubitsch	Emil Jannings	Paramount's first feature length film with talking sequences. A trailer and some fragments have been rediscovered plus a 6 minute reel found in a Portuguese archive.	
1929	The Broadway Melody	Harry Beaumont	Charles King, Anita Page	The first talkie to win an Oscar for Best Picture. The scenes also shot in two-strip Technicolor only survive in black and white.	
1929	The Cocoanuts	Robert Florey	The Marx Brothers	The preview ran 140 minutes, and was edited to 96 minutes for general release. Extant prints run just over 93 minutes, the missing footage is presumed lost.	
1929	Disraeli	Alfred E. Green	George Arliss	The 1934 re-release remains. About three minutes of the original 1929 footage are believed to be lost.	
1929	The Donovan Affair	Frank Capra	Jack Holt	The first all-talkie film released by Columbia Pictures. A mute print of this film survives in the Library of Congress, but the soundtrack, which was recorded on discs, is not known to survive. The sound disc for the trailer exists but the film does not.	
1929	Fast Company	A. Edward Sutherland	Jack Oakie, Evelyn Brent	According to the Internet Movie Database, the UCLA Film and Television Archive has reels 1, 2, and 3 of this film, with reel 4 having disintegrated in 1990.	
1929	Frozen Justice	Allan Dwan	Lenore Ulric, Robert Frazer	One reel of the silent version survives in the Library of Congress. The sound version is missing.	
1929	Fox Movietone Follies of 1929	David Butler	John Breeden, Lola Lane	Fragments have resurfaced including a Multicolor sequence	
1929	Gold Diggers of Broadway	Roy Del Ruth	Winnie Lightner, Nick Lucas, Nancy Welford	Last two reels and some fragments survive, as well as the Vitaphone sound disks.	
1929	The Great Gabbo	James Cruze	Erich von Stroheim	Originally featured sequences in Multicolor, now believed to be lost.	
1929	Happy Days	Benjamin Stoloff	Charles E. Evans, Marjorie White, Richard Keene	Second feature film in 70 mm (using the Fox Grandeur system). Widescreen version is believed lost; survives in a 35 mm version.	
1929	Married in Hollywood	Marcel Silver	J. Harold Murray	The final reel survives (in Multicolor) at the UCLA Film and Television Archive.	
1929	Midstream	James Flood	Ricardo Cortez, Claire Windsor	One reel featuring a stage performance of the opera Faust was located in 2003 and included as an extra on the 2 DVD set of The Phantom of the Opera (1925), released by the Milestone Collection.	
1929	On with the Show!	Alan Crosland	Betty Compson	The first all-Technicolor, all-talking feature, only a black-and-white version remains, although a very brief clip of color footage was found in a toy projector.	
1929	Queen of the Night Clubs	Bryan Foy	Texas Guinan	One short clip included in Winner Take All (1932) with James Cagney. Silentera.com states that an incomplete silent trailer also exists.	
1929	Red Hot Rhythm	Leo McCarey	Alan Hale Sr.	One filmed sequence, the title song ("Red Hot Rhythm"), survives in early Multicolor process.	
1929	Paris	Clarence G. Badger	Irene Bordoni, Jack Buchanan	A Technicolor fragment survives.	
1929	Rio Rita	Luther Reed	Bebe Daniels, John Boles	A cut-down 1932 re-release survives.	
1929	Sally	John Francis Dillon	Marilyn Miller	Originally produced in two-strip Technicolor, today the film survives only in black and white, save for a two-and-a-half-minute sequence from the 'Wild Rose' musical number and a 29 second fragment from the first reel. The existing print does not feature the song "After Business Hours (That Certain Bizness Bigins)" and is also thought to be lost.	
1929	Wolf of Wall Street	Rowland V. Lee	Nancy Carroll, George Bancroft	Only montage sequences by Slavko Vorkapich survive. One of these has been issued in October 2005 in the DVD collection Unseen Cinema: Early American Avant Garde Film 1894–1941.	

=== 1930s ===
Year	Film	Director	Cast	Notes	Ref.
1930	Bright Lights	Michael Curtiz	Dorothy Mackaill	No Technicolor print of this Vitaphone musical has survived.	
1930	The Cat Creeps	Rupert Julian	Helen Twelvetrees	A short segment of this sound remake of The Cat and the Canary (1927) is included in the short film Boo! (1932), the only footage known to exist prior to 2025. Additional footage was rediscovered at Indiana University Bloomington in 2025.	
1930	General Crack	Alan Crosland	John Barrymore	The silent version of this film exists. The Vitaphone discs for the sound version survive, but matching film elements are lost.	
1930	Bride of the Regiment	John Francis Dillon	Vivienne Segal, Walter Pidgeon	All-Technicolor musical drama, a twenty second fragment was located in 2023. The complete soundtrack survives on Vitaphone discs.	
1930	Good News	Nick Grinde	Bessie Love	The final reel in Multicolor is lost.	
1930	Isle of Escape	Howard Bretherton	Monte Blue, Betty Compson, Myrna Loy	The barest of fragments survive.	
1930	Lilies of the Field	Alexander Korda	Corinne Griffith, Ralph Forbes	Fragments of the "Mechanical Ballet" sequence are preserved in the 1932 Joe E. Brown comedy film The Tenderfoot.	
1930	Der Mann, der seinen Mörder sucht	Robert Siodmak	Heinz Rühmann, Lien Deyers, Hermann Speelmans, Friedrich Holländer	Originally 98 minutes long, only a 52-minute version released in 1933 as Jim, der Mann mit der Narbe remains.	
1930	No, No, Nanette	Clarence G. Badger	Bernice Claire, Alexander Gray	The soundtrack discs and the trailer survive.	
1930	The Rogue Song	Lionel Barrymore	Lawrence Tibbett, Laurel and Hardy	The soundtrack, two reels and several clips survive.	
1930	Chasing Rainbows	Charles Reisner	Bessie Love	Black-and-white portion of the film is extant; color sequences in the middle and end of the film are lost.	
1931	Annabelle's Affairs	Alfred L. Werker	Jeanette MacDonald	The last of Jeanette MacDonald's films for Fox; only one reel is known to survive.	
1931	Charlie Chan Carries On	Hamilton MacFadden	Warner Oland, Hamilton MacFadden	An alternate Spanish-language version, featuring a different cast, exists. Also, the trailer for the film survives.	
1931	Fanny Foley Herself	Melville W. Brown	Edna May Oliver	All-color film photographed in Technicolor. The University of California, Los Angeles Library's Film & Television Archive has a color 35 mm trailer.	
1931	The Ghost Train	Walter Forde	Jack Hulbert; Cicely Courtneidge; Ann Todd; Cyril Raymond	Partially recovered (five reels, two reels of the soundtrack) as a result of a 1992 British Film Institute campaign to search for lost films.	
1931	The Runaround	William James Craft	Mary Brian	Originally released as a musical as Waiting for the Bride or Waiting at the Church in Technicolor, it was re-released under the new title with the musical parts cut. Only an incomplete black-and-white copy of the cut version seems to have survived.	
1932	Condemned to Death	Walter Forde	Arthur Wontner, Gillian Lind, Gordon Harker, Cyril Raymond	A "cut version dubbed in French" was found as a result of a 1992 British Film Institute campaign to search for lost films.	
1932	Horse Feathers	Norman Z. McLeod	Marx Brothers	The only existing prints of this film are missing several minutes due to both censorship and damage.	
1932	Veiled Aristocrats	Oscar Micheaux	Lorenzo Tucker	All that remains is the trailer and fragments of two reels.	
1932	Walking Down Broadway	Erich von Stroheim	James Dunn, Boots Mallory, ZaSu Pitts	Withheld from release and re-edited as Hello, Sister!; the original version remains lost.	
1933	My Lips Betray	John G. Blystone	John Boles	The sixth reel is assumed to be lost.	
1933	The Monkey's Paw	Wesley Ruggles	Louise Carter, Ivan Simpson	Only a version dubbed in French has survived	
1933	The Testament of Dr. Mabuse	Fritz Lang	Otto Wernicke	The German premiere ran 124 minutes. The modern restored version is 121 minutes long.	
1933	West of Singapore	Albert Ray	Betty Compson , Weldon Heyburn, Margaret Lindsay	A 1 minute and 36 second fragment is available on YouTube.	
1935	The Burgomeister	Harry Southwell	Janet Ramsey Johnson	Only one sequence remains.	
1935	Devdas	P.C. Barua	P.C. Barua, Jamuna Barua	Of this classic Bengali film, only 60% still survives.	
1935	The Mystery of the Mary Celeste	Denison Clift	Bela Lugosi, Shirley Grey, Arthur Margetson, Edmund Willard	Eighteen minutes were cut from the film and the only surviving print is the shortened re-release, retitled Phantom Ship.	
1936	The Man Behind the Mask	Michael Powell	Hugh Williams, Jane Baxter, Maurice Schwartz	The surviving American release, titled Behind the Mask, is a cut version of the U.K. film.	
1936	Things to Come	William Cameron Menzies		The most complete existing version of this film runs 96m 31s, compared with its original running time of 117m 13s upon submission to the BBFC. A number of intermediate and shorter version were released at different times. A reconstructed version using extant film, production stills and extracts from the script is available on DVD.	
1937	Lost Horizon	Frank Capra	Ronald Colman	Capra's initial 210-minute version was cut down to 132 minutes after a preview screening of the film went badly. In his autobiography, Capra claims to have personally destroyed the first two reels. Subsequent re-releases were further edited to downplay allegedly Communist elements, as well as hints of swinging and various scenes which were felt to present the native children in too positive a light. While a complete soundtrack of the original 132-minute release has survived, no complete print is known to exist. A restoration substituted still photos and individual frames for the seven minutes of missing footage. One minute of footage has been found and added to a Blu-ray release of the film.	
1938	Show Business	A. R. Harwood	Bert Matthews	Only rushes from a single minor scene are left.	
1938	Thank Evans	Roy William Neill	Max Miller, Hal Walters, Albert Whelan	One hundred feet (just over a minute) of footage was found as a result of a 1992 British Film Institute campaign to search for lost films.	
1939	Tsuchi (Earth)	Tomu Uchida	Mieshi Bando, Donguriboya, Masako Fujimura, Akiko Fujimura, Mari Ko	A seriously compromised print of Earth was discovered in Germany in 1968. It suffers from decomposition and is missing the first and last reels and includes German subtitles. The original film was 142 minutes long; this version runs 93 minutes. A 119-minute version of the film, with subtitles in Russian, was discovered in Russia around the turn of the millennium. It, too, is missing the last reel.	
1939	Mr. Lahtinen Takes French Leave	Nyrki Tapiovaara	Fritz-Hugo Backman, Märtha Jaatinen	Only around 43 minutes (of the original 77) from the middle have been preserved.	
1939	The Rules of the Game	Jean Renoir	Nora Gregor, Paulette Dubost, Mila Parély	The re-construction is missing one scene from the original cut.	
1939	Banana da Terra	Ruy Costa	Carmen Miranda	3 minutes (of the original 88) have been preserved.	

=== 1940s ===
Year	Film	Director	Cast	Notes	Ref.
1940	Fantasia	Various Directors	Deems Taylor	For its 60th anniversary DVD release in 2000, Disney's manager of film restoration, Scott MacQueen, supervised a restoration and reconstruction of the original 125-minute roadshow version of Fantasia. The visual elements from the Deems Taylor segments that had been cut from the film in 1942 and 1946 were restored, as was the intermission. However, the original nitrate audio negatives for the long-unseen Taylor scenes had deteriorated several decades earlier, so Disney brought in voice actor Corey Burton to dub all of Taylor's lines. Although it was advertised as the "original uncut" version, the Sunflower edit in Beethoven's Symphony No. 6 made in 1969 was maintained. In this version, it was accomplished by digitally zooming in on certain frames to avoid showing the black centaurette character.	
1941	This Man Is Dangerous	Lawrence Huntington	James Mason	Included on the BFI's "75 Most Wanted" list of missing British feature films, a dubbed Italian copy has surfaced.	
1942	Brother Martin: Servant of Jesus	Spencer Williams		Sack Amusements, the film's distributor, went out of business, and no one preserved its collection. A trailer was found at UCLA in 2022 by Ray Langstone.	
1942	The Magnificent Ambersons	Orson Welles	Joseph Cotten, Dolores Costello	Forty-four minutes were cut by RKO Pictures from Welles' version after an unsuccessful preview, with RKO filming a new ending and destroying the deleted footage. A handful of shots from the original version exist in the film's original trailer, which has survived.	
1942	Berdjoang	Rd. Ariffien	Mohamad Mochtar	A single reel was shown at the Yamagata International Documentary Film Festival; the rest remains lost.	
1943	Sanshiro Sugata	Akira Kurosawa	Sambas	According to the Toho Studios introduction to the 1952 re-release of this film, 1,845 feet (17 minutes) were cut in 1944 due to government demands. The missing footage could not be found for the 1952 re-release and is considered lost.	
1948	Bless 'Em All	Robert Jordan Hall	Hal Monty, Max Bygraves	Placed on the BFI 75 Most Wanted list of lost films. A cut-down version titled Be Kind Sergeant was later offered for sale on eBay. A two-and-a-half minute trailer also survives.	
1948	Somewhere in Politics	John E. Blakeley	Frank Randle, Tessie O'Shea, Josef Locke	According to the British Film Institute, only a print of an "18-minute short from the film, entitled Full House", is known to exist.	

=== 1950s ===
Year	Film	Director	Cast	Notes	Ref.
1951	The Idiot	Akira Kurosawa	Setsuko Hara, Masayuki Mori, Toshiro Mifune, Yoshiko Kuga	Kurosawa wanted the original 265-minute version to be shown in two parts. When the studio balked, the film was cut to 180 minutes. After the poorly received premiere, the picture was cut, against Kurosawa's wishes, to 166 minutes. No print of the 265-minute version is known to exist; Kurosawa supposedly spent a week looking through the studio archives for the original cut when he returned to Shochiku Studios 40 years later to make Rhapsody in August.	
1951	The Red Badge of Courage	John Huston	Audie Murphy, Bill Mauldin, Douglas Dick, Royal Dano	Huston had high hopes for the movie, even considering the original two-hour cut of the film as the best he had ever made as a director. After a power struggle at the top of MGM management, the film was cut from a two-hour epic to the 69-minute version released to theaters, in response to its alleged universally disastrous previews. It was never released as an "A" feature but was shown as a second-feature "B" picture. Both Huston and star Audie Murphy tried unsuccessfully to purchase the film so that it could be re-edited to its original length. Huston did not waste any time fighting over it, as he was focused on the pre-production of his next picture, The African Queen. The studio claimed that the cut footage was destroyed, probably in the 1965 MGM vault fire. In 1975, MGM asked Huston whether he had an original cut of the film, which the studio wanted to re-release. He had actually struck a 16mm print, but by that time, it had been lost.	
1954	A Star Is Born	George Cukor	Judy Garland, James Mason	Originally premiering at 181 minutes, Warner Bros. cut the film down to 154 minutes for general release. For a 1983 restoration, running 176 minutes, the original multiple track, stereophonic sound was restored, along with some scenes that had been cut; production stills filled in for other missing scenes. A complete print is rumored to exist.	
1954	Top Banana	Alfred E. Green	Phil Silvers	Shot and edited in 3-D, the film was released in 2-D. The film only survives in a 16mm, 2-D version, although a 3-D trailer has survived.	
1956	The Burmese Harp	Kon Ichikawa		Nikkatsu, the studio that commissioned the film, released it in Japan in two parts, three weeks apart. Part one (running 63 minutes) opened on January 21, 1956, and part two (80 minutes) opened on February 12. Both were accompanied by B movies. The total running time of 143 minutes was cut to 116 for later re-release and export, reputedly over Ichikawa's objection. The original 143-minute version is lost.	
1957	Begunah	Narendra Suri	Kishore Kumar, Shakila, Helen	Due to a copyright infringement issue, Bombay High Court ordered all the prints of the film to be destroyed. However, National Film Archive of India found two 16 mm reels consisting of around 60 to 70 minutes footage in 2020.	

=== 1960s ===
Year	Film	Director	Cast	Notes	Ref.
1963	It's a Mad, Mad, Mad, Mad World	Stanley Kramer	Spencer Tracy	Premiering at 192 minutes, the movie was edited to 162 minutes for general release. In the late 1980s, 20 minutes of deleted footage were found in a warehouse which had been slated for demolition and restored to the film in 1991. The remaining lost roadshow footage was tracked down in 2013 as part of a restoration effort to return the film to its original roadshow length. A majority of the scenes found were complete; the remainder were missing either the sound or the visuals, as they were derived from original 70mm roadshow prints that were themselves edited down from Kramer's original cut. The original elements disappeared long ago.	
1964	Man in the 5th Dimension	Dick Ross	Billy Graham	This short film was originally shot in the 70mm Todd-AO widescreen process. Eleven 70mm prints were created, but none survive. The film exists in a 16mm version only.	
1964	Think	Charles and Ray Eames		The film was part of an exhibit at the 1964 New York World's Fair. Around 2016, a home movie held at Indiana University Libraries Moving Image Archives was found to include three minutes of the 1964 version.	
1964	Firelight	Steven Spielberg		The first film directed by Steven Spielberg, then only 17 years old. The 135-minute sci-fi film cost $500. Only 3% of the film survives.	
1966	The Good, the Bad and the Ugly	Sergio Leone	Clint Eastwood, Eli Wallach, Lee Van Cleef	At least two completed sequences from this film, one in which Blondie foils Tuco with the aid of a Mexican prostitute and another in which Angel Eyes explains to Blondie how he learned of Jackson's gold, were cut from all releases, including the Italian premiere version, and are now believed to be lost. All that remains of the former sequence is a snippet of footage used in a French trailer for the film, while a small number of production photos provide evidence for both scenes' existence.	
1967	Four Stars	Andy Warhol	Edie Sedgwick, Ondine	One of the longest films ever publicly screened, it ran for close to 25 hours at The Filmmaker's Cinemathèque in New York City on December 15–16, 1967. Based on extant data regarding the order of reels, films that still remain and projection information, a full reconstruction is not possible.	
1967	Great Monster Yongary	Kim Ki-duk		The original negative is thought to be lost and the original Korean-language version only exists in a 48-minute fragment. However, MGM owns a complete 35mm interpositive and textless 35mm elements for the opening and ending titles and was able to reconstruct the AIP-TV English-dubbed U.S. version in CinemaScope.	
1968	Easy Rider	Dennis Hopper	Hopper, Peter Fonda, Jack Nicholson, Luke Askew	About 80 hours were shot, mostly bike riding, but also extra scenes. Hopper came up with versions of 240 minutes, 220 and 180 minutes, all considered too long for cinema release. He was sent on holiday to Taos, and the movie was cut by others, like Henry Jaglom, to 96 minutes. All take-outs are now believed to be lost due to a fire. A small number of production photos provide evidence for extras scenes, like a police chase, and one of the Morganza café girls riding as a passenger behind Fonda.	see Easy_Rider#Post-production

=== 1970s ===
Year	Film	Director	Cast	Notes	Ref.
1971	Bedknobs and Broomsticks	Robert Stevenson	Angela Lansbury, David Tomlinson	The film was shortened after its premiere, from two and a half hours to 119 minutes. In 1996, a restoration effort was mounted, and most of the cut footage was found. However, most of the dialogue tracks for these scenes could not be recovered, so the scenes were dubbed by the original actors whenever possible. Footage of the song "A Step in the Right Direction", which was included on the original soundtrack album, has not been found.	
1971	The Big Boss	Lo Wei	Bruce Lee	After its Hong Kong run, the film was edited for Western release. Numerous cuts were made, mostly to remove the more graphic violence. Also removed was an explicit brothel scene in which Lee's character has sex with a Thai prostitute (Lee's only implied nude scene in his career). The missing footage has been rumored to still exist.	
1971	Duck, You Sucker!	Sergio Leone	Rod Steiger, James Coburn, Romolo Valli	Many versions of this film exist (the best-known and most widely available being the 157-minute version), but several scenes are known to have been cut from every release and possibly survive only through production stills. These include a scene in which John is forced to march across a desert without water (similar to a scene in Leone's previous film, The Good, the Bad and the Ugly) and one in which Dr. Villega is tortured for information by Colonel Reza.	
1972	The Last House on the Left	Wes Craven	Sandra Cassel, Lucy Grantham	This film was unusually graphic for its time and many cinema machinists made their own cuts. As a result, some scenes are missing from most versions of the film and the sound is missing from other scenes.	
1973	The Wicker Man	Robin Hardy	Christopher Lee, Edward Woodward	The original negative and film elements of Robin Hardy's 99-minute director's cut of The Wicker Man are lost and only survive on tape recordings. In 2013, StudioCanal launched a Facebook campaign to find missing material from the film, which resulted in the discovery of a 92-minute 35mm print at the Harvard Film Archive that saw a theatrical and home media release subtitled The Final Cut. This print, previously known as the "Middle Version", was assembled by Hardy for the film's then-U.S. distributor, Abraxas, for its 1979 U.S. theatrical re-release.	
1974	The Corpse Eaters	Donald R. Passmore, Klaus Vetter	Michael Hopkins, Ed LeBreton	After being sold as a tax write-off, the film faded into obscurity for years until Encore Home Video rediscovered it in 1993 and released it on DVD several years later, claiming to have transferred their copy from the only known surviving print. This version runs 57 minutes and is considered incomplete.	
1977	Last House on Dead End Street	Roger Watkins	Roger Watkins	The original cut of the film, bearing the title Cuckoo Clocks of Hell, was three hours in length. Although it was screened in 1974, this version has been lost; the original negatives are missing and may have been destroyed.	
1978	Wages of Fear	William Friedkin	Roy Scheider, Bruno Cremer, Francisco Rabal, Amidou	Re-cut version of William Friedkin's 1977 film Sorcerer for international release outside USA and France. Unauthorized work by CIC against Friedkin's wish in effort to make the film more appealing to audiences. All opening prologues were removed and reinserted as short flashbacks, reducing the runtime from 121 minutes to 88 minutes. Contains some alternative scenes not seen on the original cut, alternative takes of some scenes, different dubbing and dialogue in some scenes. Tangerine Dream's music is used much more, and the film has a happy ending compared to the original cut's darker ending. So far the original print of this version has not been resurfaced, but some fans have managed to obtain 35mm print from Czech Republic with Czech language subtitles burned to the image, and are restoring this cut.	

=== 1980s ===
Year	Film	Director	Cast	Notes	Ref.
1980	The Shining	Stanley Kubrick	Jack Nicholson, Shelley Duvall, Danny Lloyd	During the premiere of the film, a scene where Danny is recovering in a hospital and visited by Ullmann was placed before the last scene of the film. Kubrick had it excised from the film, and all known copies of the scene are lost. A script with this scene still exists, as do photographs.	
1981	For Y'ur Height Only	Eddie Nicart	Weng Weng	The original Tagalog language audio track is lost.	
1982	The Impossible Kid	Eddie Nicart	Weng Weng	A sequel to For Your Height Only, it is also missing the original Tagalog language audio track.	
1987	My Best Friend's Birthday	Quentin Tarantino	Quentin Tarantino	In the book My Best Friend's Birthday: The Making of a Quentin Tarantino Film, Tarantino admits that some rolls of film were simply discarded by mistake, and Tarantino, unsatisfied with the final product, edited together the scenes he liked, leaving the project unfinished.	

=== 2010s ===
Year	Film	Director	Cast	Notes	Ref.
2010	Who Killed Captain Alex?	Nabwana I.G.G.		The original version of the film, which does not include VJ Emmie as the "Video Joker" was lost when the director erased his computer's hard drive to make his next film Tebaatusasula (see below). Even from the existing cut, all that survives is a low-resolution DVD master.	
2010	Tebaatusasula	Nabwana I.G.G.		The original film was lost when the director's hard drive containing the original workprint crashed as a result of power outages in his neighborhood. It was later remade as Tebaatusasula: Ebola. A trailer containing footage from the film still exists.	

== See also ==
- List of lost or unfinished animated films
- List of rediscovered films
- List of films cut over the director's opposition
