= Statue (disambiguation) =

A statue is a sculpture representing one or more people or animals.

Statue, Statues or The Statue may also refer to:

== Media ==
- The Statue (1913 film), a 1913 short comedy film
- The Statue (1971 film), a 1971 British film comedy starring David Niven, Robert Vaughn and Virna Lisi
- The Statue (Seinfeld), an episode of the U.S. sitcom Seinfeld
- "The Statue", episode in the seventh season of The Andy Griffith Show
- "The Statue", season three episode of The Waltons
- The Statue (opera), (La Statue) a 19th-century opera
- The Statue, an alternative name for the character SCP-173

== Games ==
- Statues (game), (also known as Red Light, Green Light) a children's game

== Music ==
- La statue, an opera by Ernest Reyer
- Statues (album), a 2003 album by Moloko

=== Songs ===
- Statues (Amy Macdonald song), 2021
- "Statues", a song by Orchestral Manoeuvres in the Dark from Organisation
- "Statues", a song by Hüsker Dü from Everything Falls Apart
- "The Statue", a song by Don MacLean from Prime Time
- "Statue", a song by Immaculate Machine from Ones and Zeros
- "Statues", a song by Death From Above 1979 from Outrage! Is Now
- "Statue", a song by Lil' Eddie from City of My Heart
- "Statues", a song by Alexandre Desplat from Harry Potter and the Deathly Hallows – Part 2

== See also ==
- Statue, National Museum of Iran 2401, a main work of Parthian art
- List of statues
- Sculpture (disambiguation)
