= Poor Jake's Demise =

1913 film

- Directed by: Allen Curtis
- Starring: Max Asher; Lon Chaney; Daisy Small
- Distributed by: Universal Film Manufacturing Company
- Release date: August 16, 1913
- Running time: 1 reel
- Country: United States
- Languages: Silent; English intertitles

Poor Jake's Demise is a 1913 American silent short slapstick comedy film directed by Allen Curtis featuring Max Asher, Louise Fazenda, and Lon Chaney. The film focuses on Jake who finds his wife in a compromising position with another man and later takes his revenge with a seltzer bottle. It is one of several slapstick comedy films Chaney made for Universal at the start of his career and is also his first credited screen role.

The film is partially lost, but a fragment of the film (running almost 8 minutes) was discovered in England in May 2006 and restored by Lobster Films of Paris.

== Plot ==
Jake comes home and finds his wife and Willy ("The Dude") Mollycoddle in a compromising position. Enraged, Jake throws Willy out of the house and scolds his wife and threatens to kill himself. Fearful that Jake will commit suicide, the wife calls the police and three officers are sent out to find Jake. Stopping at a bar before he commits suicide, Jake finds the Dude who is drowning his sorrows. Jake takes his revenge on Willy with a seltzer bottle. Later Jake drunkenly walks down to a park fountain where he is mugged and knocked out by some ruffians. The police find Jake unconscious and carry him home to his wife, who thinks Jake has really killed himself. She contacts The Dude who comes over to help her prepare Jake's funeral arrangements, but when Jake suddenly revives from his stupor, The Dude runs out of the house in terror. Jake and his wife make up and decide to repair their marriage.

== Cast ==
- Max Asher as Jake Schultz
- Daisy Small as Jake's wife
- Lon Chaney as Willy (The Dude) Mollycoddle
- Louise Fazenda as the servant

== Production ==
Poor Jake's Demise was directed by Allen Curtis and produced by Independent Moving Pictures Company (IMP) and distributed by Universal Film Manufacturing Company. The screenplay author was not credited. The film is notable for having been the first billed appearance of Lon Chaney, and perhaps the debut of Louise Fazenda as well.

== Release and reception ==
The film was released on August 16, 1913, and had viewings in Texas, North Carolina, Pennsylvania, Wisconsin, and Illinois. A contemporary review of the film in Moving Picture World described it as "simply horse play without any special appeal, though it is harmless and lacks vulgarity."

The film was presumed lost, but a fragment of the film was discovered in England in May 2006. It has since been restored by the Haghefilm Laboratory of Amsterdam and Lobster Films, Paris. The restored fragment is 7 minutes and 52 seconds long. In 2006, the film was shown at the Pordenone Silent Film Festival. The film would also be shown at the 31st Cinéfest Sudbury International Film Festival on the evening of March 19, 2011.

In 1957, an article by Jim Neal of the Denton Record-Chronicle cited this as the first of Lon Chaney's films. Don G. Smith's book, Lon Chaney, Jr.: Horror Film Star, 1906-1973, also claims this film as Chaney's first. Rosemary Guiley would also refer to this claim in The Encyclopedia of Vampires, Werewolves, and Other Monsters. Chronologically, this is the first released film with a confirmed credit for Chaney and also the first billed release. According to Blake, Chaney did not appear in The Honor of the Family, Suspense, or The Ways of Fate, three earlier films sometimes credited to him.

== See also ==
- List of rediscovered films
