= Peter Courtney (boxer) =

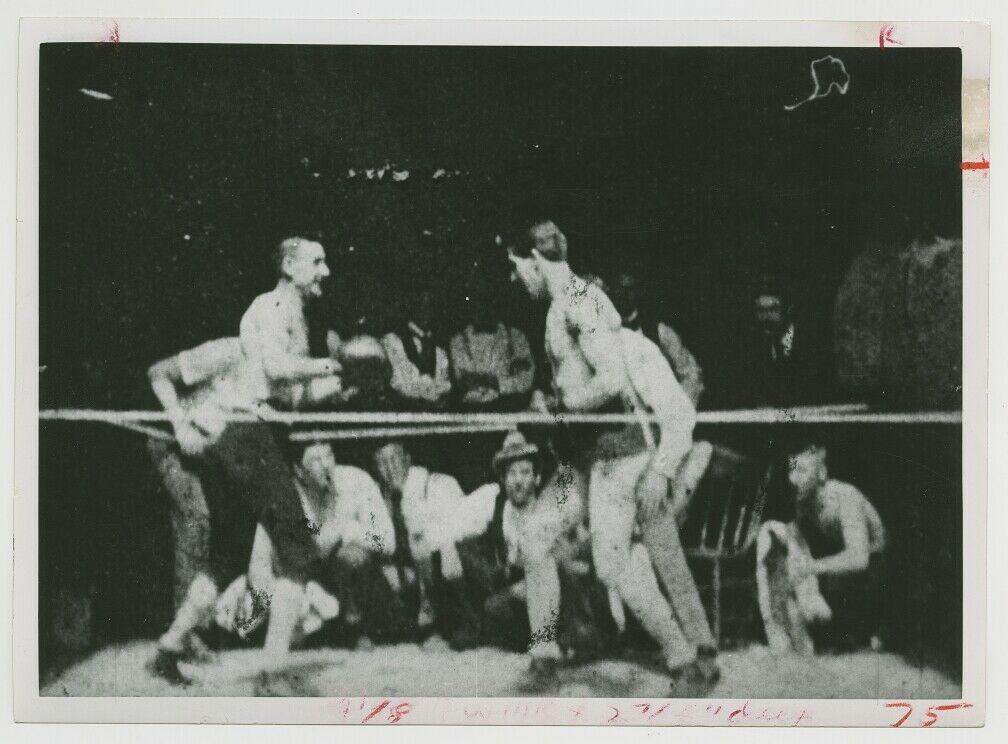
- Courtney on left, Corbett right
- Born: July 7, 1867; Doylestown, Pennsylvania, U.S.
- Died: May 11, 1896 (aged 28); Trenton, New Jersey, U.S.
- Occupations: Actor; boxer
- Years active: 1890s

Peter Courtney (July 7, 1867 – May 11, 1896) was an American boxer and actor. He was famously pitted against James J. Corbett in 1894 in a filmed boxing match by William Heise. This film was titled Corbett and Courtney Before the Kinetograph and is known as one of the first boxing matches shot with a movie camera. It was shot in Thomas Edison's Black Maria studio in East Orange New Jersey, the first purpose-built film studio. Not necessarily a true boxing match, the Corbett-Courtney match closely resembles slapboxing, shadowboxing and most accurately an exhibition match as for instance Corbett avoids knocking Courtney out when given the chance and Courtney throws wild right hands that nearly connect to Corbett's face. Courtney had five more real fights between 1894 and 1896 and lost all except one.

Courtney was born in Doylestown, Pennsylvania on July 7, 1867. He died in Trenton, New Jersey from tuberculosis, then called consumption, on May 11, 1896, aged 28.
