= Corbett and Courtney Before the Kinetograph =

- Corbett and Courtney Before the Kinetograph
- Produced by: William K.L. Dickson
- Starring: James J. Corbett; Peter Courtney
- Cinematography: William Heise
- Distributed by: Edison Manufacturing Company; F.M. Prescott
- Release date: November 17, 1894
- Running time: 6, 1 minute rounds
- Country: United States
- Language: Silent

Corbett and Courtney Before the Kinetograph (also known as Edison Kinetoscopic Record of Boxers and The Corbett-Courtney Fight) is an 1894 American short black-and-white silent film produced by William K.L. Dickson and starring James J. Corbett. It was only the second boxing match to be filmed, following The Leonard-Cushing Fight which had been filmed by Dickson on June 14, 1894.

The films are listed as "1st Round," "2nd Round," "3rd Round," "4th Round," "5th Round," and "6th Round". Only one partial round of the original six rounds remains intact.

== Plot ==
James J. Corbett (1866–1933) and Peter Courtney (1867–1896) both take part in a specially arranged boxing match under special conditions that allow for it to be filmed and displayed on a Kinetograph. The match consists of six one-minute rounds. James J. Corbett was a boxing hero of the time while Courtney was the underdog.

== Production ==
The film was produced by the Edison Manufacturing Company, which had begun making films in 1890 under the direction of one of the earliest pioneers to film William K.L. Dickson. It was filmed entirely within the Black Maria studio at West Orange, New Jersey, in the US, which is widely referred to as "America's First Movie Studio". It was filmed on September 7, 1894. Courtney died a little over a year after the film was made.

According to the Internet Movie Database, the film was made in a 35 mm format with an aspect ratio of 1.33 : 1. The movie was intended to be displayed on a Kinetoscope.

== Cast ==
- James J. Corbett as Boxer (Boxing hero of the time)
- Peter Courtney as Boxer (Underdog)

uncredited

- Maurice Barrymore as Corner Man for Corbett
- William Muldoon as Corner Man for Corbett
- Melbourne MacDowell as Corner Man for Courtney

== Current status ==
The film's copyright has now expired and it is freely available on the internet to download. A copy is kept by the Library of Congress and can be viewed on their American Memory website. In 1997 it was featured in Sports on the Silver Screen, an anthology, narrated by Liev Schreiber, which looks at sports in cinema from the earliest silent films. It also included on disc one of the DVD Edison: The Invention of the Movies.

== See also ==
- List of boxing films
- The Corbett-Fitzsimmons Fight, 1897 film
