= Almost an Actress =

1913 film

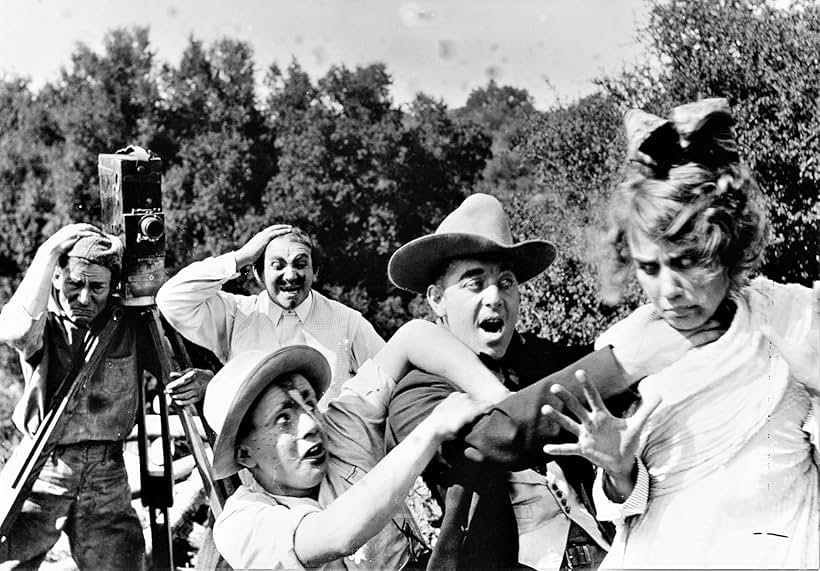
- Directed by: Allen Curtis
- Written by: Unknown
- Starring: Louise Fazenda; Max Asher; Lon Chaney
- Distributed by: Universal Film Manufacturing Company; Joker Comedies
- Release date: November 15, 1913
- Running time: 10 minutes (one reel)
- Country: United States
- Language: Silent with English intertitles

Almost an Actress is a 1913 American silent short comedy film directed by Allen Curtis and starring Louise Fazenda, Max Asher, Lon Chaney and Silvion de Jardin. A surviving still from the film shows Lon Chaney as the exasperated cameraman, grimacing in frustration as chaos envelops the film set. The film is now considered lost. It is unknown when the film was lost, but if it was in Universal's vaults it would have been deliberately destroyed along with the remaining copies of Universal's silent era films in 1948.

Comedian Silvion de Jardins, who later changed his name to Bobby Vernon, also worked for the Kolb and Dill burlesque and stage company, which had also once starred Lon Chaney in its productions.

== Plot ==
Susie turns down Lee's offer of love, planning instead to become a famous actress. The director of a film team engages Susie to star in an exciting serial after his leading lady's false teeth break, but chaos ensues. Susie's brother Benny sees her being menaced by a villain who is preparing to burn her alive, not realizing they are just making a movie. He alerts the fire department, who create a deluge on the set with their hoses. The director finally manages to chase the firemen away.

Later, while filming a scene on a beach, Susie is almost drowned accidentally when the film crew leaves her tied up in a rising tide. Her boyfriend rescues her just in time, and Susie decides to marry him and give up acting forever. Realizing how dangerous filmmaking can be, she exclaims "Never again!" as she falls into her beau's arms.

== Cast ==
- Louise Fazenda as Susie
- Max Asher as The Director
- Edward Holland as The Villain
- Lee Morris as Lee
- Lon Chaney as a cameraman
- Silvion de Jardin as Benny (Susie's brother)
- Lee Moran

== Reception ==
Motion Picture World commented "A very laughable production of the low comedy type, full of chuckles and free from offense....The scenes are all of burlesque nature and furnish plenty of genuine amusement."
