= Max Asher (actor) =

American actor (1885–1957)

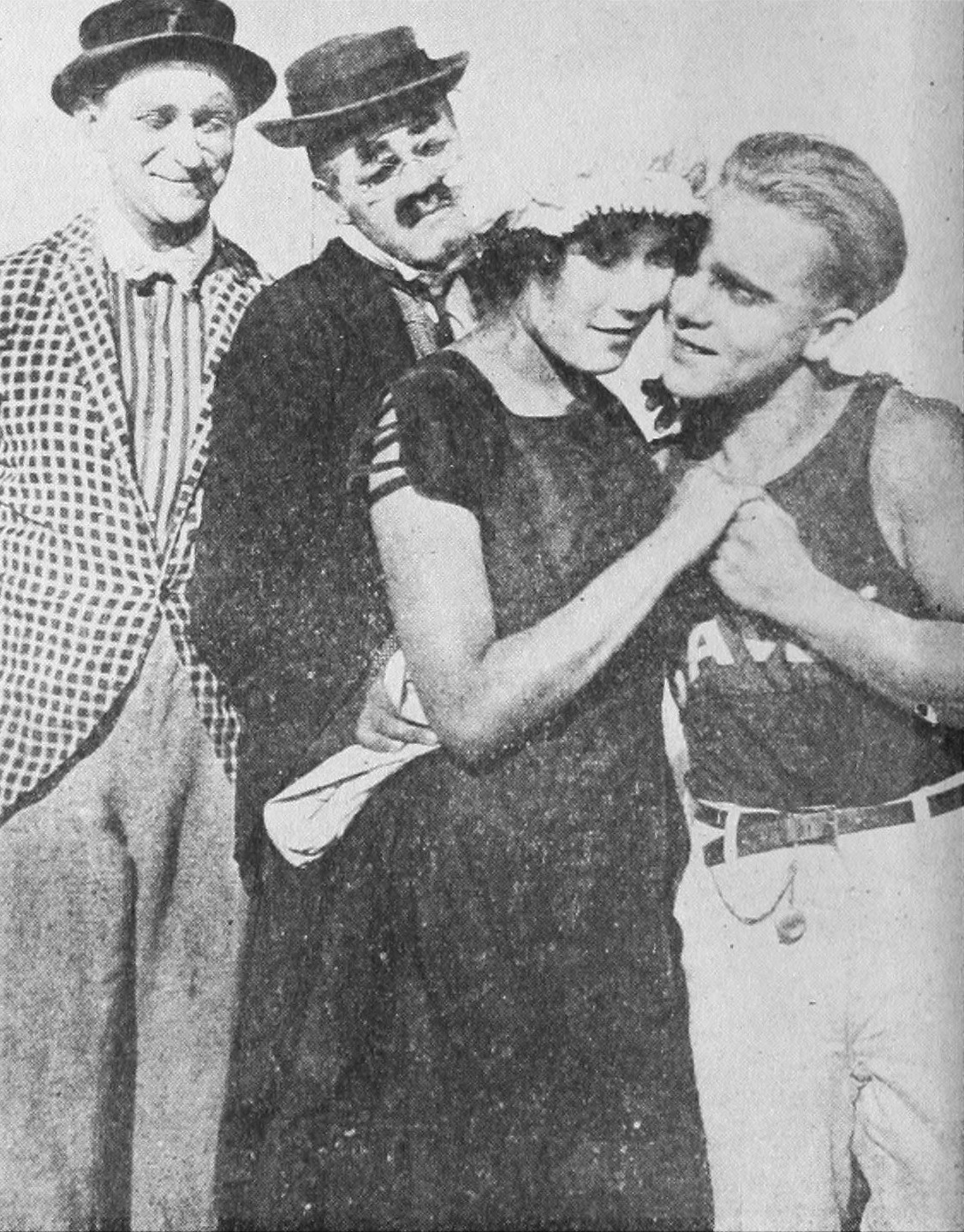
- Max Asher on left in Mike and Jake at the Beach (1913)
- Born: Max Ascher; May 5, 1885; Oakland, California, U.S.
- Died: April 15, 1957 (aged 71); Los Angeles, California, U.S.
- Occupation: Actor

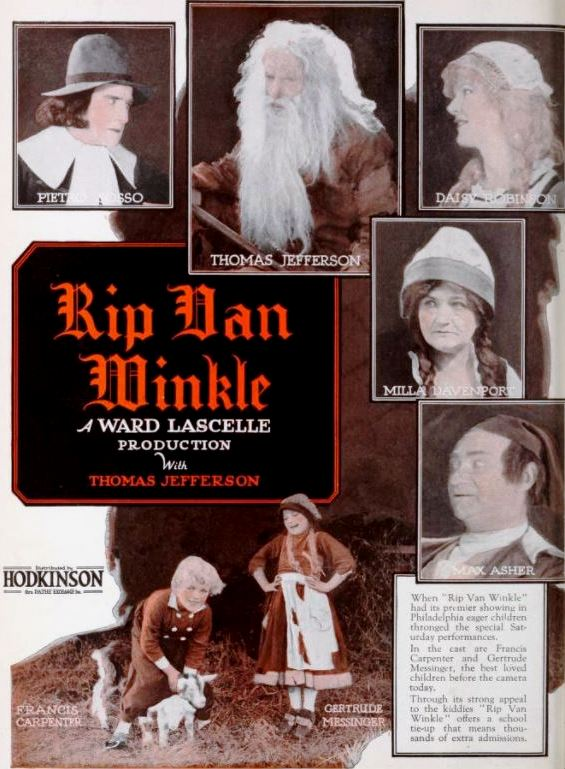
Advertisement for Rip Van Winkle (1921) including an image of Asher in his role as Nick Vedder

Max Asher, born Max Ascher, (May 5, 1885 – April 15, 1957) was an American actor whose career spanned the early silent film era to talkies in the early 1930s. His career began on stage. He appeared in various comedic shorts. He was 5 feet 9 inches (1.75 m) tall, and weighed more than 200 pounds (91 kg). In the 1920s he transitioned to character actor roles.

He was born in Oakland.

Asher was part of Universal Pictures' Joker Comedy unit with Gale Henry and Milburn Morante. Asher appeared in a title role with Henry in Lady Baffles and Detective Duck and 12 short films produced by Pat Powers in 1915.

He died in Los Angeles.

== Filmography ==
- The Tramp Dentists (1913)
- The Cheese Special (1913)
- Almost an Actress (1913)
- The Statue (1913)
- Poor Jake's Demise (1913)
- Lady Baffles and Detective Duck (1915) short film series
- The Bravest of the Brave (1915)
- A Yankee Princess (1919)
- Rip Van Winkle (1921)
- Mixed Nuts (1922)
- The Ladder Jinx (1922)
- Slow as Lightning (1923)
- At Devil's Gorge (1923)
- Lights Out (1923)
- The Shooting of Dan McGrew (1924)
- Dynamite Dan (1924), as Max Aschert
- The Open Switch (1925)
- Somewhere in Wrong (1925)
- Heir-Loons (1925)
- The Red Kimono (1925)
- Sunshine of Paradise Alley (1926)
- The Call of the Wilderness (1926)
- The Carnival Girl (1926)
- Unseen Enemies (1926)
- We're in the Navy Now (1926)
- Beyond the Rockies (1926)
- Crazy like a Fox (1926)
- Painting the Town (1927)
- Lost at the Front (1927)
- Galloping Fury (1927)
- Play Safe (1927)
- She's My Baby (1927)
- Avenging Fangs (1927)
- Burning Up Broadway (1928)
- The Kid's Clever (1929)
- Sweethearts on Parade (1930)
- Trigger Tricks (1930)
- Subway Express (1931)
- Soul of the Slums (1931)
