= Ireland a Nation =

1914 film

- Directed by: Walter MacNamara
- Written by: Walter MacNamara
- Produced by: Walter MacNamara
- Starring: Barry O'Brien; Patrick Ennis; Dominick Reilly; Barney Magee; P J Bourke; Fred O’Donovan
- Production company: MacNamara Feature Film Company
- Distributed by: T A Sparling; Gaelic Film Company
- Release dates: 22 September 1914 (United States); 8 January 1917 (Ireland)
- Running time: 52 minutes
- Countries: United Kingdom; Ireland
- Languages: Silent film English intertitles

Ireland a Nation is a 1914 silent film directed, written and produced by Walter MacNamara, telling the history of Ireland between 1798 and 1914.

== Plot ==
The film depicts major political events in Ireland between 1798 and 1914, including the 1798 Rebellion, the 1800 Act of Union, the 1803 Rebellion of Robert Emmet, Catholic Emancipation, the Great Famine and the Home Rule movement.

It takes several liberties with history; most notably, Father John Murphy (executed in 1798) is shown reacting to the 1800 Act of Union; Anne Devlin is depicted as the wife of Michael Dwyer, when they were cousins and not romantically involved; and Robert Emmet is shown speaking with Napoleon, when that meeting is not thought to have occurred.

== Production ==
Ireland a Nation was filmed on 35 mm. Production was financed by Emmett Moore. Filming took place in summer 1914 on location in Ireland and at Kew Bridge Studios in Twickenham.

== Release ==
Ireland a Nation was premiered in the U.S. on 23 September 1914. It received poor reviews but was very popular with Irish Americans, running for 20 weeks in Chicago. In May 1915 a copy was sent to Great Britain aboard the RMS Lusitania, which was sunk by a German submarine off Ireland.

The film received a Press Censor's Certificate in December 1916, although some scenes had to be cut and intertitles rewritten. It went on release in Ireland on 8 January 1917 at the Rotunda Picture House, Dublin, just 8 months after the Easter Rising. It was shut down by military order just two days after, apparently because the audience were deemed to be too pleased by certain scenes, such as the killing of British soldiers.

It was reissued in 1920 with additional material covering the intervening years. This new edition was first shown in Ireland in January 1922.

The film only survives in part, with 34 minutes of dramatised footage and 8 minutes of actuality footage surviving; the entire first reel is lost.

== See also ==
- List of incomplete or partially lost films
