= The Centaurs (1921 film) =

1921 animated film

The remaining footage

The Centaurs is an animated film produced and directed by Winsor McCay between 1918 and 1921. There is no record that the film was completed or publicly screened. The film was destroyed by negligent storage that allowed the sole surviving nitrate film print to deteriorate into dust. All that remains are isolated fragments that total approximately 90 seconds.

== Plot ==
The surviving footage presents a young female centaur picking flowers, a male centaur throwing a rock at (and, perhaps, killing) an eagle in flight, a pair of elderly centaurs (the male is bald with a long white beard, the female wears pince-nez eyeglasses) welcoming the younger centaurs, and a bald boy centaur who jumps around. Since no screenplay of the film is known to exist, it is not clear how these scenes were meant to be connected.

== See also ==
- List of incomplete or partially lost films
