= Think (1964 film) =

Think is a 1964 multi-screen movie directed by architect and filmmaking couple Charles Eames and Ray Eames. The film was shown in the IMB booth of the 1964 New York World's Fair. As of right now, around 22 minutes of the film are available, while the remaining film is considered lost.

== Synopsis ==
The film was initially shown on 22 separated television screens, 14 large ones and 8 smaller ones. The film ran for about 30 minutes. The film is said to show "both humor and exciting action sequences that a computer can help solve problems of any scale, including seating at a dinner party, city planning, weather prediction and coaching football." The film was revolutionary for the time, showing how computers could advance the world in the future.

== Showing ==
The film was shown in the IMB booth of the 1964 New York World's Fair. It was shown in the Ovoid Theater, a large egg shaped theater built by Charles and Ray Eames for the World's Fair. A live emcee greeted the audience as they arrived.

== Rediscovery ==
After the World's Fair, the film was thought to have been lost. The Eames made a few film reels of images from the show, but most of the footage was deemed lost. Later parts of the film were rediscovered in a home movie of the 1964 New York World's Fair in a collection of films by Edward Fiel. The film was in the Moving Images Archive of Indiana University Bloomington. The Fiel Family had donated their home movie collection to the University, including the home film. The University, the Library of Congress, and New York University's Moving Image Archiving and Preservation (MIAP) worked to restore the film, leading to 22 minutes of film being recovered and put online.

== See also ==
List of incomplete or partially lost films
