= The Statue (1913 film) =

1913 film by Allen Curtis

The Statue is a 1913 comedy short directed by Allen Curtis. The film features Harry Fisher as the artist with Max Asher, Lee Morris and Doc Vinard. The film is unrelated to fr:La Statue, a French silent film directed by Alice Guy-Blaché in 1905.
