= Sculpture (disambiguation) =

Sculpture is the art of shaping figures or designs in the round or in relief, or a work of art created by sculpting.

Sculpture may also refer to:

- Sculpture (Lindberg), 2005 orchestral composition by Magnus Lindberg
- Sculpture (magazine)
- Sculpture (mollusc), the three-dimensional ornamentation on the outer surface of a shell, as distinct from the basic shape of the shell itself or colouration.
- The Sculpture, an alternative name for the character SCP-173

== See also ==
- Statue
- Sculptures of Anything Goes, a song by Arctic Monkeys from their seventh studio album, The Car.
