= James J. Corbett =

American boxer (1866–1933)

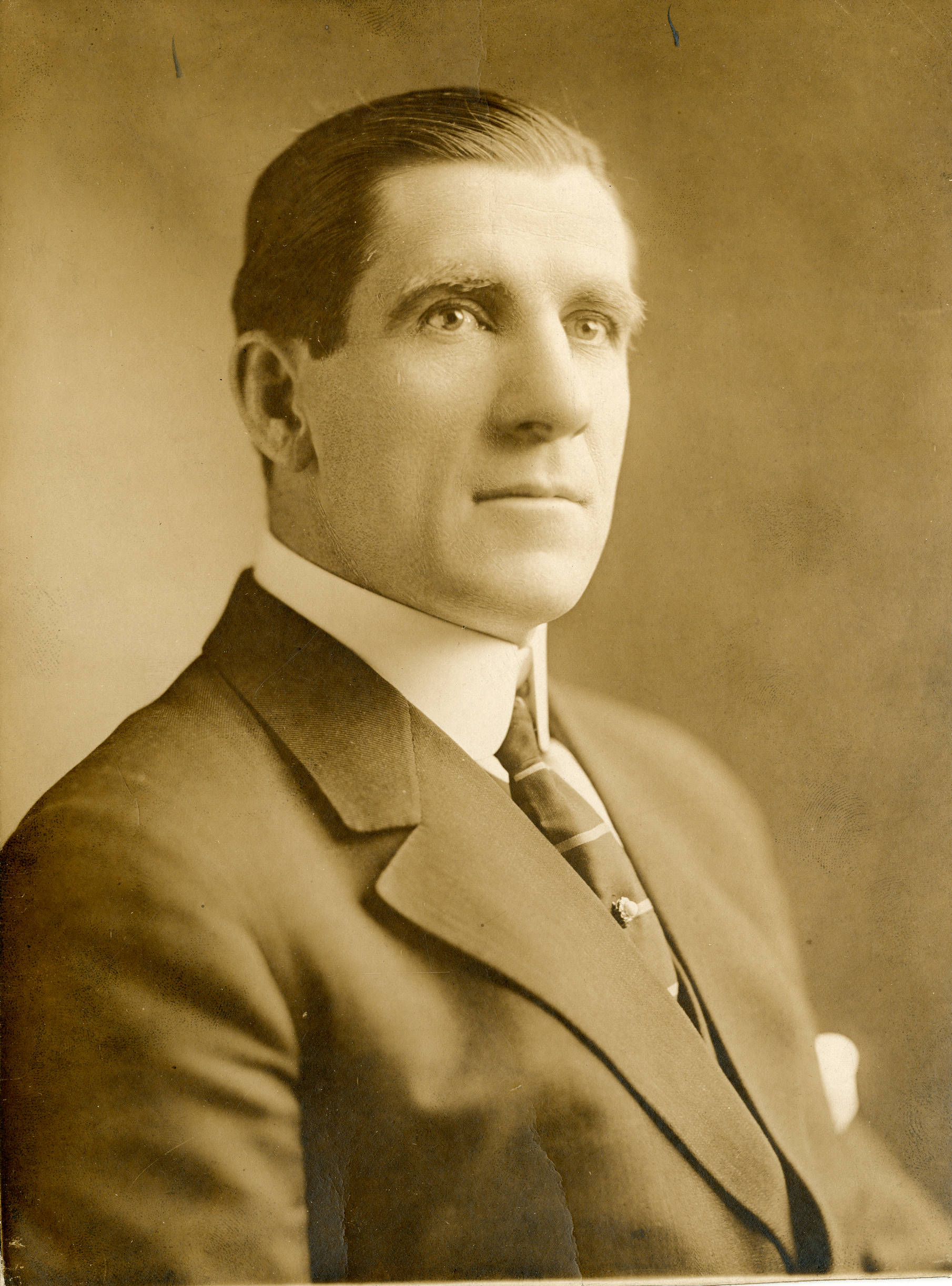

Personal information
- Nickname: Gentleman Jim
- Born: James John Corbett; September 1, 1866 San Francisco, California, U.S.
- Died: February 18, 1933 (aged 66) Bayside, Queens, New York, U.S.
- Height: 6 ft 1 in (1.85 m)
- Weight: Heavyweight

Boxing career
- Reach: 73 in (185 cm)
- Stance: Orthodox

Boxing record
- Total fights: 35
- Wins: 24
- Win by KO: 12
- Losses: 4
- Draws: 3
- No contests: 2

James John Corbett (September 1, 1866 – February 18, 1933) was an American professional boxer and a World Heavyweight Champion, best known as the only man who ever defeated John L. Sullivan (hence the "man who beat the man" concept of the championship boxing lineage). Despite a career spanning only 20 bouts, Corbett faced the best competition his era had to offer, squaring off with a total of nine fighters who would later be enshrined alongside him in the International Boxing Hall of Fame.

Corbett introduced a scientific approach to boxing, in which technique and his innovative methods triumphed over brute force. He pioneered the daily boxing training routine and regimen, which was adopted by other boxers elsewhere and has survived to modern days almost intact. A "big-money fighter," Corbett was one of the first athletes whose showmanship in and out of the ring was just as good as his boxing abilities. He also arguably became the first modern sports sex symbol after the film of his championship prizefight against Robert Fitzsimmons was aired worldwide, popularizing boxing immensely among the female audience. He did so in an era in which prizefighting was illegal in 21 states and was still considered among the most infamous crimes against morality.

He also pursued a career in acting, both before and after his boxing career.

== Early life ==
He was a son of Patrick Corbett, who emigrated from Ballycushion, Kilmaine, County Mayo, Ireland in 1854. His mother was of Scottish ancestry. James Corbett graduated from Sacred Heart High School in San Francisco, California and was rumored to have a college education. He pursued a career in acting, performing at a variety of theatres, before becoming a boxer. He was also a boxing trainer. His brother, Joe Corbett, would become a Major League Baseball pitcher.

== Boxing career ==
Dubbed Gentleman Jim Corbett by the media, he has been called the "Father of Modern Boxing" for his scientific approach and technical innovations.

=== Corbett–Jackson fight – 1891 ===
On May 21, 1891, Corbett fought Peter "Black Prince" Jackson, a much-heralded bout between crosstown rivals, since they were both boxing instructors at San Francisco's two most prestigious athletic clubs. They fought to a no-contest after 61 rounds.

The fight vaulted Corbett to national prominence and the public clamored for a contest between him and champion John L. Sullivan. Sullivan reluctantly agreed, and a fight date was set.

=== Corbett–Sullivan fight – 1892 ===
Corbett went into rigorous training and was confident of his chances after he sparred with Sullivan in a short exhibition match on a San Francisco stage. On September 7, 1892, at the Olympic Club in New Orleans, Louisiana, Corbett won the World Heavyweight Championship by knocking out John L. Sullivan in the 21st round. Corbett's new scientific boxing technique enabled him to dodge Sullivan's rushing attacks and wear him down with jabs.

Corbett did not prove to be a "Fighting Champion" in today's terms, meaning he defended the title very rarely. It was an era before boxing commissions, and regulation of the sport was minimal at best. Boxing was outlawed in most states, so arranging a time and place for a bout was largely a hit-and-miss proposition. Corbett treasured his title and viewed it as the ultimate promotional tool for his two main sources of income, theatrical performances and boxing exhibitions.

The 1894 boxing match vs Peter Courtney

In his only successful title defense on January 25, 1894, Corbett knocked out Charley Mitchell of Great Britain in three rounds.

James Corbett also returned to his father's native Ballinrobe in 1894, and among the highlights of his visit were the boxing demonstrations he gave in Ballinrobe Town Hall. The proceeds from the event's entrance fees were donated for the upkeep of the parish church in Ballyovey (now Partry), County Mayo, where his uncle, Rev. James Corbett, was then parish priest. He also donated a stained glass window to the church. He coached boxing at the Olympic Club in San Francisco.

On September 7, 1894, he took part in the production of one of the first recorded boxing events, a fight with Peter Courtney. It was filmed at the Black Maria studio at West Orange, New Jersey, and was produced by William K.L. Dickson. It was only the second boxing match to be recorded.

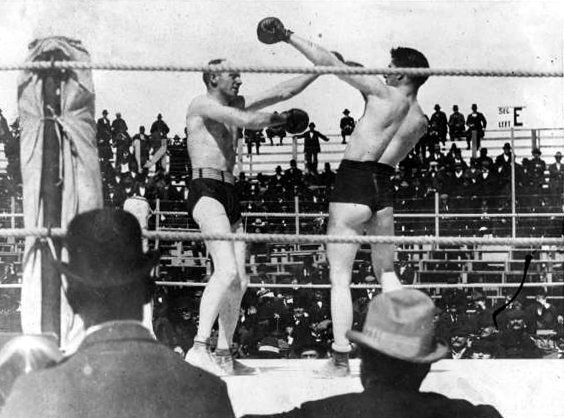
The 1897 boxing match vs Fitzsimmons

=== Fitzsimmons–Corbett fight – 1897 ===
in 1897 Corbett lost his Heavyweight Championship to the Cornish British boxer Bob "Ruby Robert" Fitzsimmons in Carson City, Nevada. Corbett was dominant for most of the fight and knocked Fitzsimmons to the canvas in the sixth round. Fitzsimmons recovered and, though badly cut, rallied from that point on. When Mrs. Fitzsimmons called out, "Hit him in the slats, Bob!", where "slats" meant the abdominal area, her husband followed her advice. The body blows took their toll, and though Corbett continued to outbox his opponent masterfully, ringsiders could see the champion slowing down. Fitzsimmons put Corbett down in the 14th round with a withering body blow to the solar plexus, and Corbett, despite his best efforts, could not regain his feet by the end of the ten-count. The fight, lasting over an hour and a half, was released to cinemas later that year as The Corbett-Fitzsimmons Fight, the longest film ever released at the time.

Devastated by the loss of his title, Corbett did everything he could to lure Fitzsimmons back into the ring. He was sure Fitzsimmons's victory was a fluke, believing he (Corbett) had over-trained, leaving him short on stamina in the later rounds. Perhaps Fitzsimmons felt the same way, for not even a $30,000 guaranteed purse posted by Corbett's manager, William A. Brady, could get Ruby Robert back into the ring with Gentleman Jim. It may also have been Fitzsimmons's intense personal dislike of Corbett, who had often publicly insulted him, which ruled out any chance of another fight.

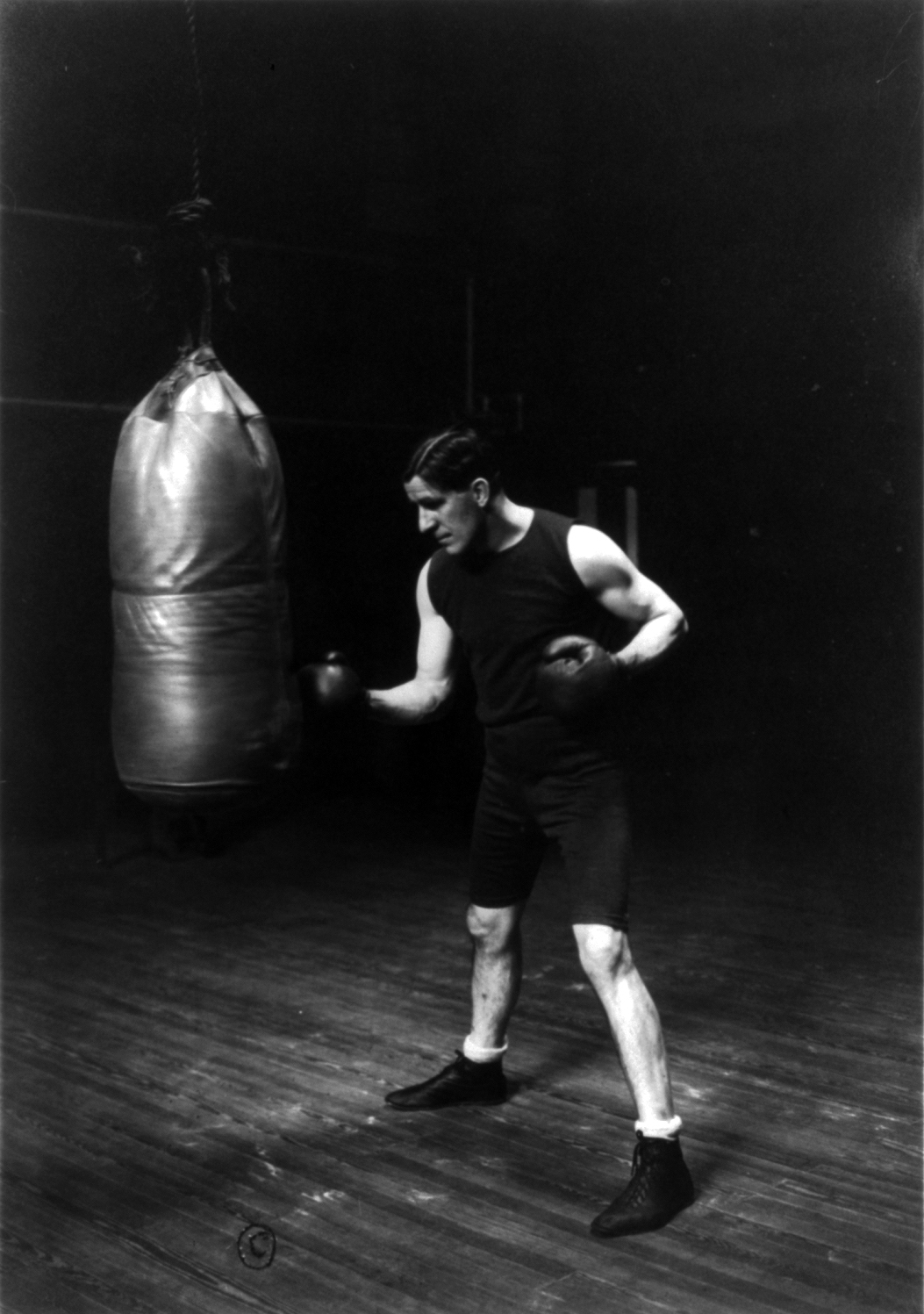
Corbett training for his fight with Jeffries

This set the stage for what most boxing experts and ring historians consider to be Corbett's finest fight. Refusing to face Corbett, Ruby Robert chose the hulking James J. Jeffries, a former sparring partner of Corbett's and a big heavyweight even by modern standards, for his title defense.

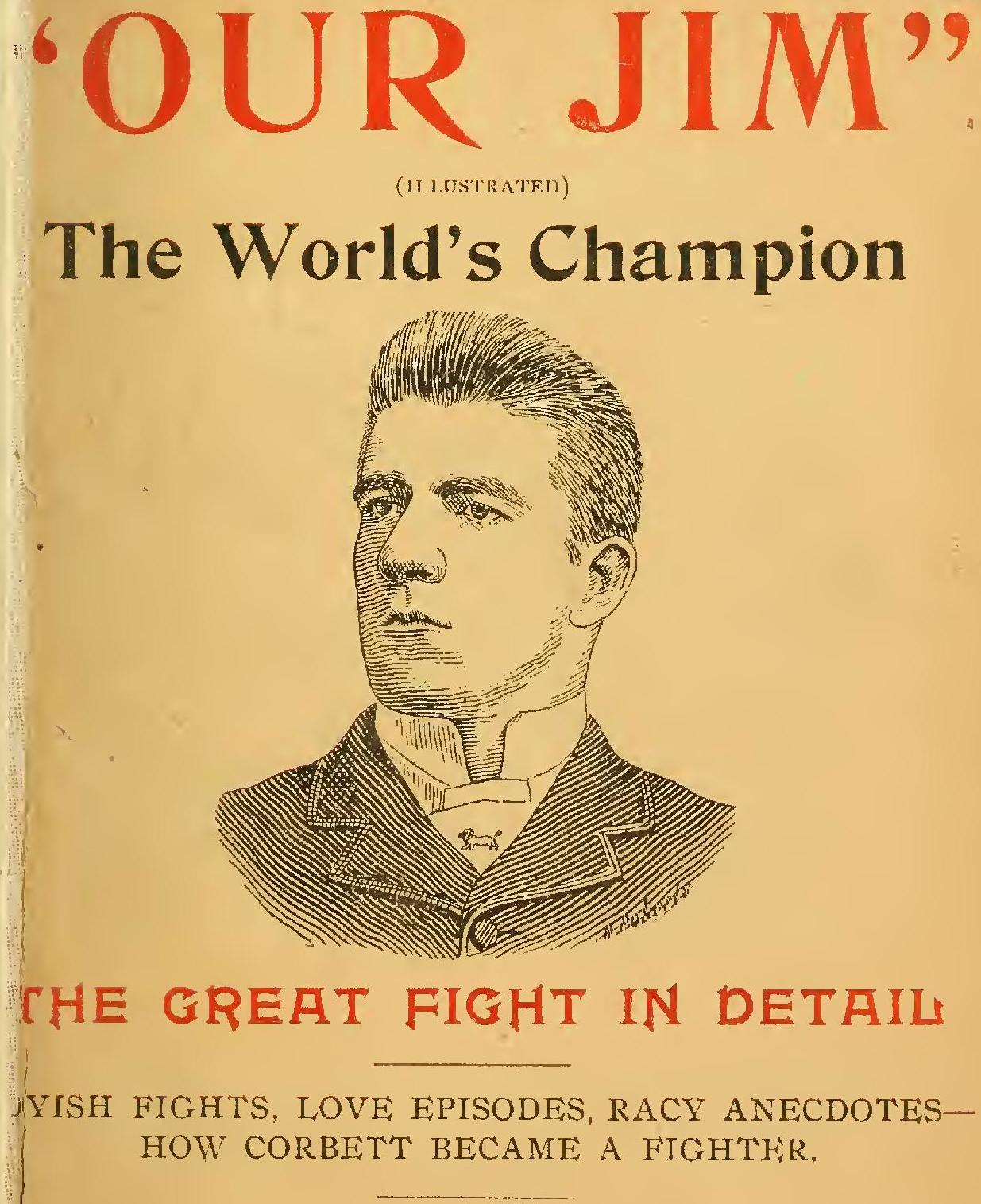
Cover art of 1892 book Our Jim the World's Champion

=== Corbett–Jeffries fight – 1900 ===
Jeffries had learned much of his trade training with Corbett and was now handled by Corbett's old manager, William Brady. After Jeffries beat Fitzsimmons, Corbett, who had been sidelined during Fitzsimmons's reign, suggested a title fight between the new champion and himself. Brady, liking Corbett and reflecting after a recent poor showing against Tom Sharkey that his old fighter had little left in the tank at age 34, agreed to the match, which was set for the Seaside Arena in Coney Island, New York.

While Jeffries went through the motions in training, Corbett prepared like a Spartan for battle. He knew, with his speed, he could out-box his larger and stronger opponent, but he was giving up size, strength, almost 30 lb. in weight and a seven-year age difference. The key, he felt, was stamina and the ability to last the 25-round fight limit.

The early rounds saw Corbett moving quickly while "Big Jeff" attempted body shots. However, Jeffries could not lay a glove on the "Dancing Master". Round after round, Corbett had his way, darting in to land punches, then dancing away to avoid retaliation. By the 20th round, Jeffries' corner was in a panic. Manager Brady dismissed trainer Tommy Ryan from the corner and took charge himself with the simple but direct order, "Knock him out or lose your title!" Corbett only had to stay upright for the last five rounds to be heavyweight champion once again. Jeffries stalked Corbett around the ring, looking for an opening. Corbett danced away from any threat through the 22nd round.

Midway through the 23rd round, Corbett leaned back to avoid a blow from Jeffries, bounced off the ropes and was put on the canvas by a short right hand. He was counted out. Corbett found himself embraced by the public after this gallant effort. The adoration was short-lived, as his next fight, a five-round knockout over Kid McCoy, was widely believed to be a fix.

=== Later career and life after boxing ===
Corbett managed to contest for the heavyweight title one last time when he met Jeffries for a second match in San Francisco in 1903. Now 37, and with his reflexes slowing, Corbett survived a withering body blow in the second round and used every trick he knew to hang on until he was knocked out in the tenth.

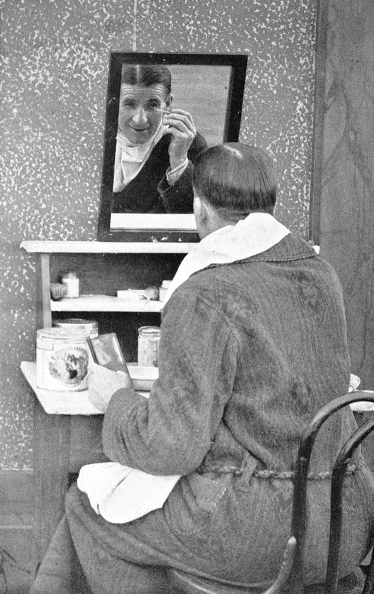
Corbett applying acting makeup

Following his retirement from boxing, Corbett returned to acting, appearing in low-budget films and giving talks about pugilism. He also performed a minstrel show in skits with Cornelius J. O'Brien.

Corbett was married to Mary Olive Morris Higgins from 1886 until their divorce in 1895. He later married the actress Jessie Taylor, also known by her stage name, Vera. She survived Corbett by more than a quarter century. From 1903 until his death, Corbett lived at 221-04 Corbett Road in a three-story home in the Bayside neighborhood of the borough of Queens in New York City.

In 1924, he had a friendly sparring match with the future champion Gene Tunney, an admirer of Corbett's scientific style. Tunney was amazed at the ability of Corbett to spar, even at the age of about 60, and claimed that Corbett had better defense than Benny Leonard.

== Death ==
Corbett died of liver cancer on February 18, 1933, aged 66. His body was interred in the Cypress Hills Cemetery in Brooklyn, New York.

== Legacy ==
On its creation in 1990, he was elected posthumously to the International Boxing Hall of Fame. There is also a street named for him in Bayside, Queens where he resided from 1902–1933.

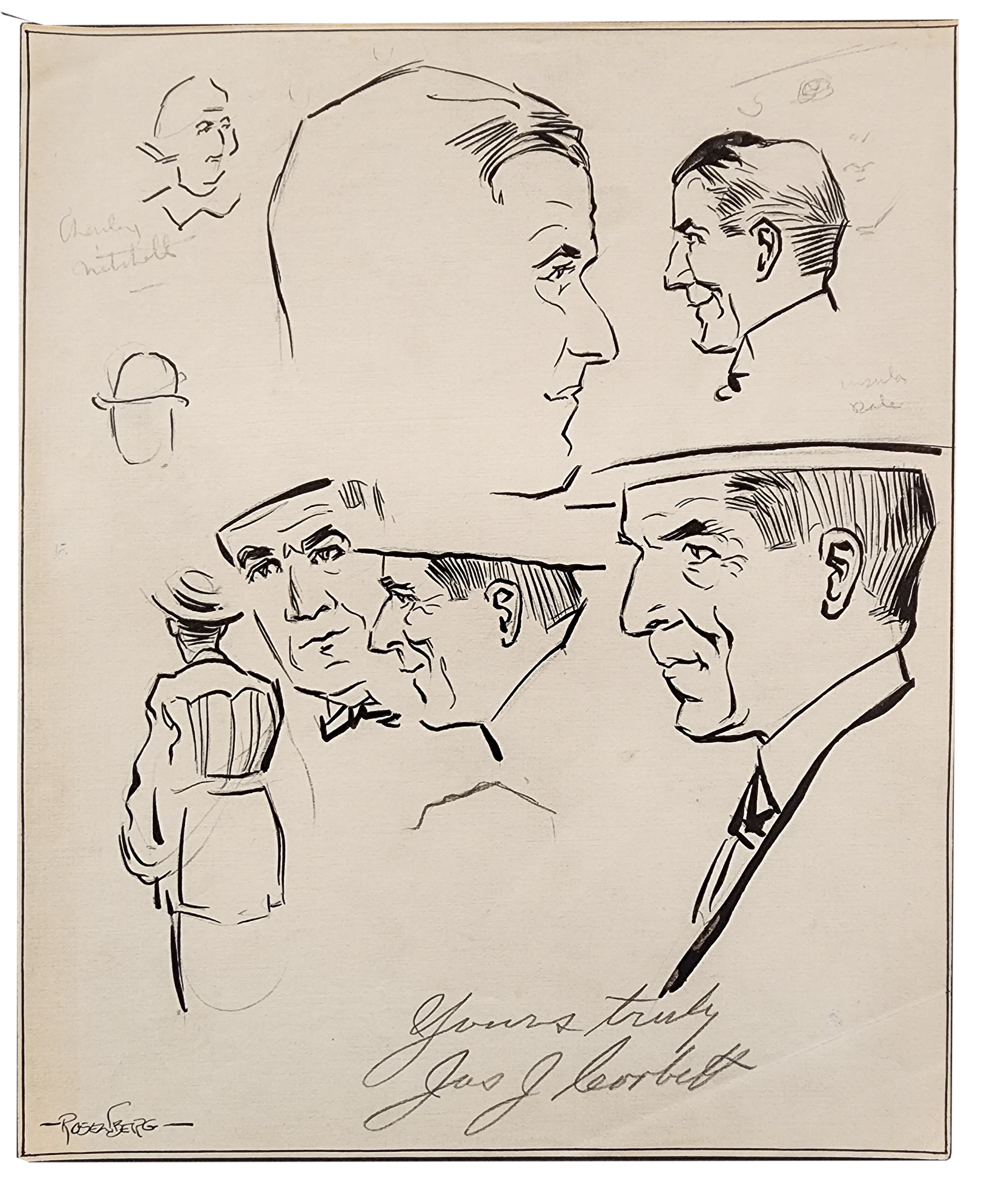
Signed sketches of John J Corbett by Manuel Rosenberg for the Cincinnati Post 1922

Corbett's great-great-great-nephew, Dan Corbett, was a professional heavyweight boxer from San Antonio, Texas, who won the United States Boxing Federation and International Boxing Organization Intercontinental Heavyweight titles before retiring.

James J. Corbett is not related to fellow boxing Hall of Famer Young Corbett II.

== Cultural references ==
In 1892, the Spalding company, under their own publishing company Spalding Athletic Library, issued “Life and Battles of James J. Corbett”, Volume 1, Number 1. The book includes stories of Corbett's past opponents. The editor Richard K Fox refers to Corbett as the California Wonder and a professor (of boxing).

In 1924, Corbett authored his autobiography under the title The Roar of the Crowd; the story was serialized by The Saturday Evening Post in six weekly installments during October/November 1924. The following year, G.P. Putnam's Sons published it in book form, marketing it as the "True Tale of the Rise and Fall of a Champion." In 1942, the story was made into a Hollywood motion picture titled Gentleman Jim, starring Errol Flynn as Corbett.

Corbett is a supporting character in Last on His Feet: Jack Johnson and the Battle of the Century, a graphic novel biography of Jack Johnson, which largely centers on Johnson's bout with Jim Jeffries. Corbett is depicted as a supporter and cornerman for Jeffries and is one of Johnson's harshest and most virulent detractors.

The 1980 film Tom Horn, starring Steve McQueen, begins as he rides into a small town and encounters Corbett before his fight with Sullivan.

== Professional boxing record ==
36 fights	24 wins	4 losses
By knockout	12	3
By decision	11	0
By disqualification	1	1
Draws	5	
No contests	3	

No.	Result	Record	Opponent	Type	Round, time	Date	Location	Notes
35	Loss	23–4–5 (3)	James J. Jeffries	TKO	10 (20)	14 Aug 1903	Mechanic's Pavilion, San Francisco, California, U.S.	For world heavyweight title
34	Win	23–3–5 (3)	Kid McCoy	KO	5 (25)	30 Aug 1900	Madison Square Garden, New York City, New York, U.S.	
33	Loss	22–3–5 (3)	James J. Jeffries	KO	23 (25), 2:11	11 May 1900	Seaside Athletic Club, Coney Island, New York, U.S.	For world heavyweight title
32	Loss	22–2–5 (3)	Tom Sharkey	DQ	9 (20)	22 Nov 1898	Mechanic's Pavilion, San Francisco, California, U.S.	
31	Loss	22–1–5 (3)	Bob Fitzsimmons	KO	14	17 Mar 1897	The Race Track Arena, Carson City, Nevada, U.S.	Lost world heavyweight title
30	Draw	22–0–5 (3)	Tom Sharkey	PTS	4	24 Jun 1896	Mechanic's Pavilion, San Francisco, California, U.S.	
29	Win	22–0–4 (3)	Charley Mitchell	KO	3	25 Jan 1894	Duvall Athletic Club, Jacksonville, Florida, U.S.	Retained world heavyweight title
28	Win	21–0–4 (3)	John L. Sullivan	KO	21, 1:30	7 Sep 1892	Olympic Club, New Orleans, Louisiana, U.S.	Won world heavyweight title
27	Win	20–0–4 (3)	John McCann	TKO	1	6 Apr 1892	Hartford, Connecticut, U.S.	
26	NC	19–0–4 (3)	Joe Lannon	PTS	4	16 Feb 1892	New York City, New York, U.S.	
25	Win	19–0–4 (2)	Ed Kinney	PTS	4	8 Oct 1891	Milwaukee, Wisconsin, U.S.	
24	NC	18–0–4 (2)	Peter Jackson	NC	61	21 May 1891	California Athletic Club, San Francisco, California, U.S.	
23	Win	18–0–4 (1)	Dominick McCaffrey	TKO	4 (4)	14 Apr 1890	Fifth Avenue Casino, Brooklyn, New York, U.S.	
22	Win	17–0–4 (1)	Jake Kilrain	PTS	6	18 Feb 1890	Southern Athletic Club, New Orleans, Louisiana, U.S.	
21	Draw	16–0–4 (1)	Dave Campbell	PTS	10	28 Dec 1889	Mechanic's Pavilion, San Francisco, California, U.S.	
20	Win	16–0–3 (1)	Australian Billy Smith	PTS	6	12 Dec 1889	Portland, Oregon, U.S.	
19	Win	15–0–3 (1)	Australian Billy Smith	PTS	6	11 Dec 1889	Portland, Oregon, U.S.	
18	Win	14–0–3 (1)	George Atkinson	KO	1	Jul 1889	San Francisco, California, U.S.	
17	Win	13–0–3 (1)	Joe Choynski	PTS	4	15 Jul 1889	San Francisco, California, U.S.	
16	Win	12–0–3 (1)	Joe Choynski	KO	27	5 Jun 1889	Benicia Harbor, Benicia, California, U.S.	
15	NC	11–0–3 (1)	Joe Choynski	NC	4	30 May 1889	Fairfax, California, U.S.	
14	Win	11–0–3	William Miller	PTS	6	Nov 1888	San Francisco, California, U.S.	
13	Draw	10–0–3	Frank Glover	PTS	3	30 Jun 1888	San Francisco, California, U.S.	
12	Win	10–0–2	Bill Hayes	KO	3	1887	San Francisco, California, U.S.	
11	Draw	9–0–2	Jack Burke	PTS	3	27 Aug 1887	San Francisco, California, U.S.	
10	Win	9–0–1	Martin Costello	PTS	3	2 Feb 1887	San Francisco, California, U.S.	
9	Win	8–0–1	James C. Dailey	TKO	2	2 Feb 1887	San Francisco, California, U.S.	
8	Win	7–0–1	Duncan McDonald	PTS	6	Dec 1886	Evanston, Wyoming, U.S.	
7	Draw	6–0–1	Duncan McDonald	PTS	6	3 Jul 1886	Opera House, Salt Lake City, Utah, U.S.	
6	Win	6–0	Frank Smith	DQ	3	3 Jul 1886	Pavilion, Salt Lake City, Utah, U.S.	
5	Win	5–0	William T. Welch	KO	1	3 Dec 1885	Oakland, California, U.S.	
4	Win	4–0	Dave Eisemann	TKO	2	28 Aug 1885	Olympic Club, San Francisco, California, U.S.	
3	Win	3–0	Professor John Donaldson	PTS	4	1885	San Francisco, California, U.S.	
2	Win	2–0	Billy Keneally	PTS	4	1884	San Francisco, California, U.S.	
1	Win	1–0	Joe Choynski	KO	1	1884	San Francisco, California, U.S.	

== Films ==
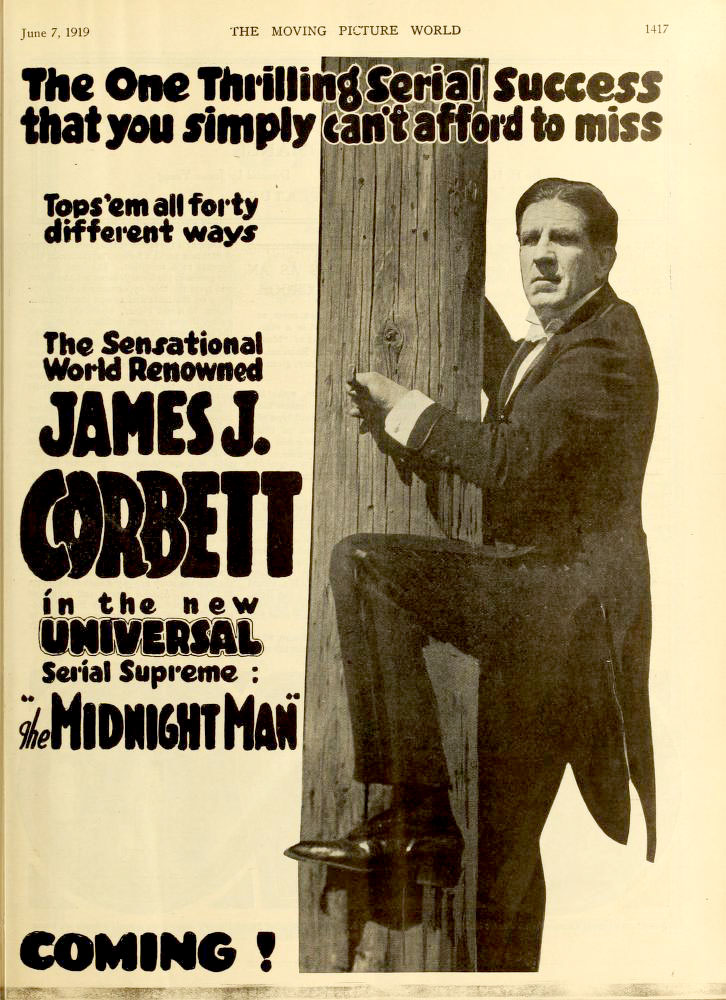
Advertising for The Midnight Man (1919).

Thomas Edison wrote "I remember Jim Corbett very well, for he was a very important part of the first motion picture that we made for public exhibition. Yes, he can justly claim the distinction of being the oldest living film star, and I extend him my hearty congratulations," from a letter in 1930.

- Corbett and Courtney Before the Kinetograph (1894, Short)
- Actor's Fund Field Day (1910, Short) – Himself
- How Championships Are Won—And Lost (1910, Documentary short) – Himself
- The Man from the Golden West (1913) – Gentleman Jim
- The Burglar and the Lady (1914, based on the play of the same name that he also appeared in) – Danvers / Raffles
- The Other Girl (1916) – Frank Sheldon, 'Kid Garvey'
- The Midnight Man (1919) – Bob Gilmore aka Jim Stevens aka The Midnight Man
- The Prince of Avenue A (1920) – Barry O'Connor
- The Beauty Shop (1922) – Panatella
- Broadway After Dark (1924) – Himself, Cameo Appearance
- James J. Corbett and Neil O'Brien (1929, Short) – Himself – Prizefighter
- Happy Days (1929) – Interlocutor – Minstrel Show #1 (final film role)
- At the Round Table (1930, Short) – Himself

== See also ==
- List of heavyweight boxing champions

Awards and achievements
Preceded by John L. Sullivan	World Heavyweight Champion; September 7, 1892 – March 17, 1897	Succeeded by Bob Fitzsimmons
