= The Ways of Fate =

1913 film

- Directed by: Wallace Reid
- Produced by: Allan Dwan
- Starring: Wallace Reid; Vivian Rich
- Distributed by: Mutual Film
- Release date: April 19, 1913
- Country: United States
- Languages: Silent; English intertitles

The Ways of Fate is a 1913 American silent short romance film produced by the American Film Manufacturing Company. The film's directorial and producer roles have been both attributed to Allan Dwan, but other sources point to Wallace Reid as director. The film's fictional plot is centered on Jim Conway, who grew up wanting to avenge his father's death and headed West to seek his father's killer. Lost in the mountains, he is saved by a young woman and the two fall in love. After a few weeks with her, Conway reveals the reason he came west and the young woman's father overhears it. The old man confesses to killing Conway's father, over a game of cards, and bares his chest. Conway refuses to take revenge, because love had diminished such feelings. The film was released on April 19, 1913 and it had a widespread national release. It is not known whether the film currently survives, but it is presumed lost.

== Plot ==
A surviving description of this lost film was published in The Moving Picture World. It states: "Two men playing cards, the argument, flash of a revolver, and one lay dead. The murderer homeward fled, hurried his little girl baby into a west-bound train and was heard of no more. The years passed and boyish Jim Conway grew to manhood with the sole purpose of seeking out his father's murderer to deal justice to him. He went West and was one day lost in the mountains. He called for help and help came in the form of a sweet-faced woman who led him to her home. He spent the flying weeks with her and the aged father, learned to love the mountain nymph for her beauty of soul and fair face. One day she asked him his reasons for being in the hill country, and he, lover-like, confided his secret. Behind the door, sat the white-haired father. He rose, shook himself like a leaf as be invited the young man into the house. And there he confessed the deed, baring his chest for the expected blow. But none fell for love had sweetened the poison of his thought." This summary of the film was provided by the American Film Manufacturing Company.

== Cast ==
- Wallace Reid as Jim Conway
- Vivian Rich
- Murdock MacQuarrie

A single line in The Motion Picture Story Magazine notes that "Vivian Rich played opposite Wallace Reid in "The Ways of Fate." According to E. J. Fleming, author of Wallace Reid: The Life and Death of a Hollywood Idol, the cast marks the debut of Lon Chaney, but this is unsupported and disputed. Fleming also credits Pauline Bush in a role, but this is also disputed.

== Production and release ==
The Illustrated Guide to Film Directors credits Allan Dwan for directing the film and Sweethearts of the Sage attribute Wallace Reid. Wallace Reid: The Life and Death of a Hollywood Idol credits Dwan as the producer and Reid as the director, but gives an incorrect release date. Fleming states that the film was made on December 26–27, 1912, that Reid was injured the next day when his horse fell and that he could not work until mid-January.

On April 13, 1913, an announcement was made that Allan Dwan has been fired from the American Film Manufacturing Company. The dismissal came as a shock to Dwan and stemmed from a personal dispute with J. Warren Kerrigan. Frederic Lombardi, author of Allan Dwan and the Rise and Decline of the Hollywood Studios, suggests that Dwan learned of his firing on April 12, 1913, based on a telegram Dwan sent to the Selig Polyscope Company on April 12 inquiring about employment opportunities. A newspaper article tried to dispel rumors about Dwan's dismissal, termed "retirement," having resulted in much dissatisfaction within the company. On April 20, there was an announcement that Pauline Bush and Jessalyn Van Trump were also leaving the company. Lombardi says the two actresses may have had a personal reason to follow Dwan's departure. In May, there was an announcement that Dwan, Bush and Van Trump had joined Universal Film Manufacturing Company.

The film was released on April 19, 1913, by the American Film Manufacturing Company, also known as "The Flying A" or "American." The company described the film as a "half-social, half-western" film.

== Release and legacy ==
The film saw widespread release in the United States. Advertising theaters were included in Washington D.C., Utah, Pennsylvania, Texas, Kansas, North Carolina, and Missouri. The film was also released internationally with advertisements in Manitoba, Canada and in London, United Kingdom.

Fleming's book credits The Ways of Fate as the debut of Lon Chaney, but this has been disputed. The documentary Lon Chaney: A Thousand Faces states that his film debut occurred after his wife's suicide attempt in April 1913 and "his earliest films were made at the first studio to open in Hollywood, Nestor." Jon C. Mirsalis notes in his website that the film "almost certainly [did not feature] Chaney, although it was directed by Allan Dwan. Wouldn't it be interesting if Chaney worked at a studio other than Universal in 1913!" \Michael Blake, a Lon Chaney historian and author of several books on Lon Chaney's life and work, notes that the possibility exists that Chaney performed in a role during a period of unemployment in 1912. Blake notes that this would have occurred before Lon Chaney rejoined Clarence Kolb and Max Dill's company in San Francisco, California in September 1912. Furthermore, the Encyclopedia of Early Cinema states that the American Film Manufacturing Company had moved to its Santa Barbara, California location in the summer of 1912 and that Dwan, who would later work with Chaney, left the company after a dispute with J. Warren Kerrigan in 1913. Chaney's appearance in the film is not cited by any Chaney historians. The film is presumed lost.
