= Leonard–Cushing Fight =

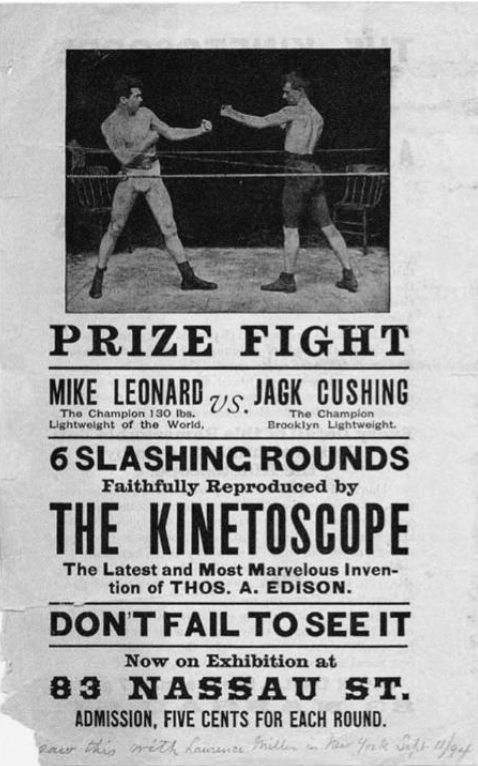
- An advertisement for the Leonard–Cushing Fight, a 1894 black-and-white silent film, featuring a boxing match.
- Produced by: William K.L. Dickson
- Starring: Mike Leonard; Jack Cushing
- Cinematography: William Heise
- Distributed by: Edison Manufacturing Company
- Release date: August 4, 1894
- Running time: 6 minutes
- Country: United States
- Language: Silent

The Leonard–Cushing Fight is an 1894 American short black-and-white silent film produced by William K.L. Dickson, starring Mike Leonard and Jack Cushing. Leonard and Cushing participated in a six-round boxing match under special conditions that allowed for it to be filmed and displayed on a Kinetoscope. The film was shot on an uncertain date between May 24 and June 14, 1894, in a specially configured ring at Edison's Black Maria film studio in West Orange, New Jersey, New Jersey. Premiering on August 4, 1894, in Manhattan, the film is considered the first sports film ever released. As of 2023, no full print of the film is known to have survived, making it partially lost. A 23-second fragment is available at the Library of Congress.

== Plot ==
Boxers Mike Leonard and Jack Cushing participate in a six-round exhibition boxing bout. According to Terry Ramsaye, the fighters "[...] went six savage, abbreviated rounds of desperate fighting. In the sixth round Cushing, trapped by a feint, dropped his guard and stopped a swift right and left chop to the jaw." A summary in The Illustrated American states that following the handshake, Leonard broke away "with his usual rushing style, punched his opponent in the stomach and kept up these tactics until he exhausted this man." The film concludes with Leonard knocking out Cushing.

== Cast ==
- Michael Wellington Leonard (credited as Mike Leonard)
- Jack Cushing

== Background and production ==
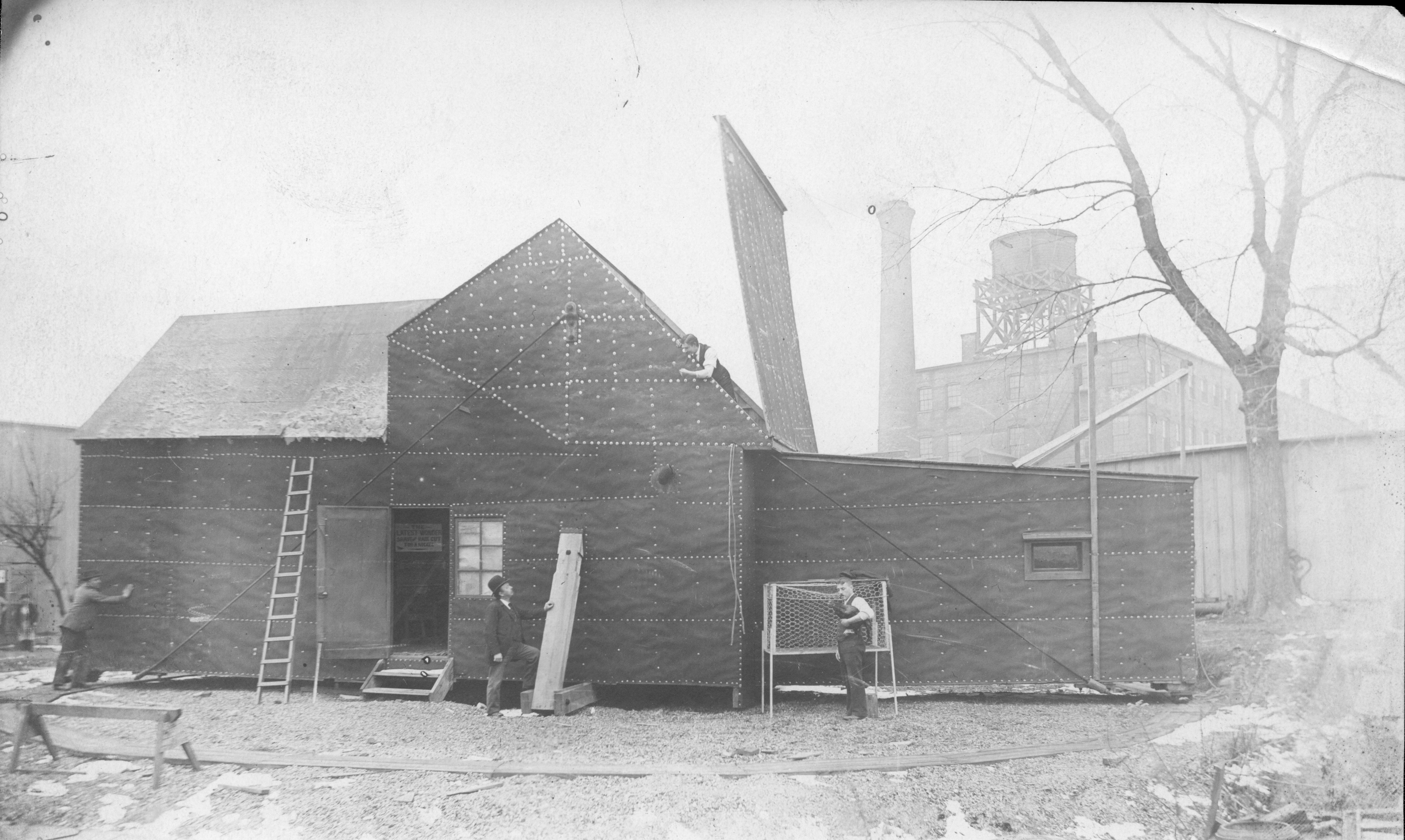
The film was shot in a specially configurated ring in Edison's Black Maria film studio in West Orange, New Jersey.

In 1888, Thomas Edison became interested in developing motion-picture devices. Edison appointed his company's photographer William K.L. Dickson to develop such a device. Dickson, alongside his assistant Charles Brown, began working on different concepts the following year. Alongside William Heise, the company experimented with recording boxing matches in the spring of 1891. Twelve feet of film were shot either in May or June 1891, featuring two Edison Manufacturing Company employees pretending to spar in a boxing ring. In a May 1891 interview with The Sun, Edison announced his desire to display prize fights through his Kinetoscope:; "To the sporting fraternity I can say that before that before long it will be possible to apply this system to prize fights and boxing exhibitions."

The Kinetoscope had its world premiere on May 9, 1893, at the Brooklyn Institute of Arts and Sciences. Further development of motion picture devices led to the first private Kinetoscope parlor opening in April of the following year. Edison's business partners, Otway and Grey Latham, Enoch J. Rector, and Samuel J. Tilden Jr., sought to capitalize on the device's popularity. The group chose prizefighting as an easy subject to film, but the Kinetoscope needed further development to properly capture a fight. In May 1894, Otway ordered ten Kinetoscopes with enlarged spool-banks to allow for a larger capacity at a lower frame rate.

According to film historian Gordon Hendricks, preparations for filming may have begun as early as May 24, 1894. Heise and Dickson experimented with various New York-based boxers, including Kid Lavigne, Young Griffo, and Jack McAuliffe, all of whom dropped out of the project. Leonard initially rejected the proposal due to the US$35 (US$1,096 in 2021) payment, which he deemed low. He later received US$150 (US$4,698 in 2021), and all of his expenses were paid. Filming took place in mid-June to early July 1894 (Note: There is disagreement on the recording date of the film. Hendricks concludes that the recording date was June 14, based on accounts by the New York World and The Orange Journal. Ramsaye claimed in 1922 that the film was recorded in early July, which Hendricks refutes. The New York World account from June 16, 1984, says that "Yesterday morning [...]", pointing at a June 15 recording date.) in a 10 feet (3.0 m) to 12 feet (3.7 m) ring (Note: The June 16 account from The Sun and New York World says that the previous boxers didn't want to fight in a 12 feet (3.7 m) ring, while Ramsaye claims 10 feet (3.0 m).) at Edison's Black Maria film studio. The team had to wait several days for clear weather, as the studio required natural light. The fight was watched by Edison and six unnamed partners. The exact number of rounds recorded is uncertain. A June 16 account published in the New York World speaks of six rounds, while The Sun and Ramsaye claim ten recorded rounds. Further disagreement exists regarding the total amount of film recorded. According to the New York World, 46 frames per second, totaling 16,500 frames, were taken, accounting for 900 feet (270 m), while Ramsaye claims ten rounds and 1,000 feet (300 m). Hendricks calls Ramsaye's claim of ten rounds an error. Edison's own March 1900 catalog lists each round at 150 feet (46 m), for a total of 900 feet (270 m). Regardless of the actual length, the film was the longest ever produced at the time. Cushing told the New York World that fighting in front of a Kinetoscope was not a real fight. Leonard told the paper: "generally hit 'im in the face, because I felt sorry for his family and thought I would select only place that couldn't be disfigured. It's lucky the rounds lasted only a minute, for while I tried to spare him, of course I couldn't keep all my strength in." Leonard later recounted that Edison treated him well and that he "didn’t want to be too quick for his machine."

== Release and legacy ==
The fragment of the movie

The Leonard–Cushing Fight premiered on August 4, 1894, at a Kinetoscope parlor owned by the Latham brothers' Kinetoscope Exhibiting Company at 83 Nassau Street in Manhattan. The film was sold by the round, for five cents each. According to Ramsaye, "throngs packed the place and by the second day two long lines of waiting patrons trailed back into the street on either side of the entrance. The police came to keep order in the queue." Gamache claims that "the relative obscurity of the fighters, both of whom were from Brooklyn, and the fact that viewers could opt to pay for only the knockout round contributed to the lack of success of the Lathams’ parlor." Other screenings took place at 457 Fulton Street in Brooklyn. On April 2, 1895, the Continental Commerce Company premiered the film at 70 Oxford Street in London. By March 1900, the publisher was selling each round of the film for US$22.50.

Prize fights were outlawed in New Jersey in 1835. According to an article published in The Sun on June 16, 1894, New Jersey grand juries investigated a potential prize fight at Edison's studio. However, no record of such an investigation exists.

According to the Library of Congress, the film was never copyrighted by Edison; it received the fragment from Louise G. Ernst. The Library of Congress website lists Hendricks as the source of the 37-second fragment. As part of a pre-1900 film exhibition, the British National Film Theatre screened the surviving fragment on three occasions: November 21, 28, and December 12, 1994.

== See also ==
- List of boxing films
- List of incomplete or partially lost films
