= A Grandmother's Story =

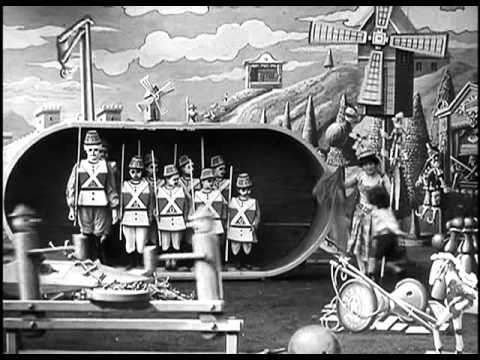
- A frame from the film
- Directed by: Georges Méliès
- Starring: André Méliès
- Production company: Star Film Company
- Release date: 1908
- Running time: 243 meters 790 feet
- Country: France
- Language: Silent

A Grandmother's Story (1908)

A Grandmother's Story (French: Conte de la grand-mère et Rêve de l'enfant), also known as Au pays des Jouets, is a 1908 French silent trick film by Georges Méliès. It was sold by Méliès's Star Film Company and is numbered 1314–1325 in its catalogues.

The child in the film is played by Méliès's son, André Méliès, who was seven years old at the time. The film's special effects include stage machinery, substitution splices, multiple exposures, and dissolves.

The complete film was about 243 meters (790 feet) long, of which fragments are known to survive; some scenes in the middle of the film are presumed lost.
