= Allen Curtis =

American film director (1877–1961)

- Born: 1877; New York, New York
- Died: November 24, 1961 (aged 83–84); Hollywood, California
- Occupation: Film director
- Years active: 1913–1922

Allen Curtis (1877 – November 24, 1961), was an American film director of the silent era. He directed 278 films between 1913 and 1922. He was born in New York, New York and died in Hollywood, California.

== Selected filmography ==
- The Tramp Dentists (1913)
- Almost an Actress (1913)
- Poor Jake's Demise (1913)
