= A Very Honorable Guy =

1934 film by Lloyd Bacon

- DVD cover
- Directed by: Lloyd Bacon
- Screenplay by: Earl Baldwin
- Based on: A Very Honorable Guy; 1929 story in Cosmopolitan by Damon Runyon
- Produced by: Hal B. Wallis
- Starring: Joe E. Brown; Alice White; Robert Barrat; Alan Dinehart; Irene Franklin; Hobart Cavanaugh
- Cinematography: Ira H. Morgan
- Edited by: William Holmes
- Music by: Bernhard Kaun
- Production company: Warner Bros. Pictures
- Distributed by: Warner Bros. Pictures
- Release date: May 5, 1934
- Running time: 62 minutes
- Country: United States
- Language: English

A Very Honorable Guy is a 1934 American pre-Code comedy film directed by Lloyd Bacon, written by Earl Baldwin, and starring Joe E. Brown, Alice White, Robert Barrat, Alan Dinehart, Irene Franklin and Hobart Cavanaugh. It was released by Warner Bros. Pictures on May 5, 1934.

== Plot ==
Well respected local good guy, Feet Samuels finds himself heavily in debt due to an uncharacteristic gambling binge. Feet decides the only way to settle the bill is by selling his body to an ambitious doctor. The doctor agrees to allow him one last month to live life to the fullest, then commit suicide.

== Cast ==
- Joe E. Brown as “Feet” Samuels
- Alice White as Hortense Hathaway
- Robert Barrat as Dr. Snitzer
- Alan Dinehart as Joel “The Brain” Baldwin
- Irene Franklin as Toodles Hathaway
- Hobart Cavanaugh as Benny
- Arthur Vinton as Moon O'Hara
- G. Pat Collins as Red Hendrickson
- Harold Huber as Joe Ponzetti
- James Donlan as Mr. O'Toole
- Harry Warren as Harry
- Bud Jamison as Waiter (uncredited)
