= Jay Gelzer =

American writer

Jay Gelzer (January 22, 1889 – June 15, 1964) was an American writer. She wrote novels and short stories, including several that were adapted into films.

Gelzer was born in England, brought to the United States as a child, and was adopted after her mother's death. She lived in St. Louis, Missouri, where she graduated from Central High School and was a member of the St. Louis Writers' Guild. She later lived in Santa Monica and Detroit.

Gelzer's writing was published in Good Housekeeping, Cosmopolitan, and the New York Daily News.

Her book The Street of a Thousand Delights contained eight stories about a "half-breed" in Melbourne's Chinese quarter. She helped adapt her first novel Compromise, set in St Louis, into a film version for Warner Brothers (Compromise).

Her book "Broadway Musketeers" was adapted into film in 1929 as the film "Broadway Babies" starring Alice White.

She married Jennings Axon Glazer and had two sons.

== Selected works ==
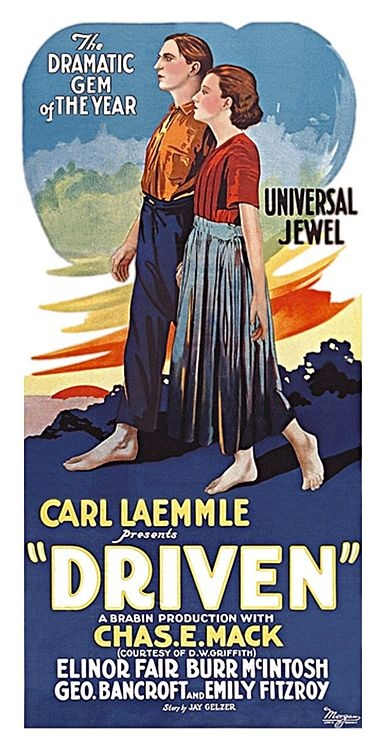
Film poster for Driven

- The Street of A Thousand Delights (1921), short stories
- "The Flower of the Flock", short story
- Joan Trevore (1922), her first novel
  - Adapted into Driven (1923)
- Riding Lights (1924), a play in three acts
- Compromise (1923), her first novel Robert M. McBride & Company
  - Adapted into Compromise (1925)
- "Broadway Musketeers", short story
  - Adapted into Broadway Babies (1929)
- Rich People, serialized novel that ran in Good Housekeeping
  - Adapted into Rich People (1930)
- Another Dawn (1932), a three act play written with George Bryant of Boston
