= The Naughty Flirt =

1931 film

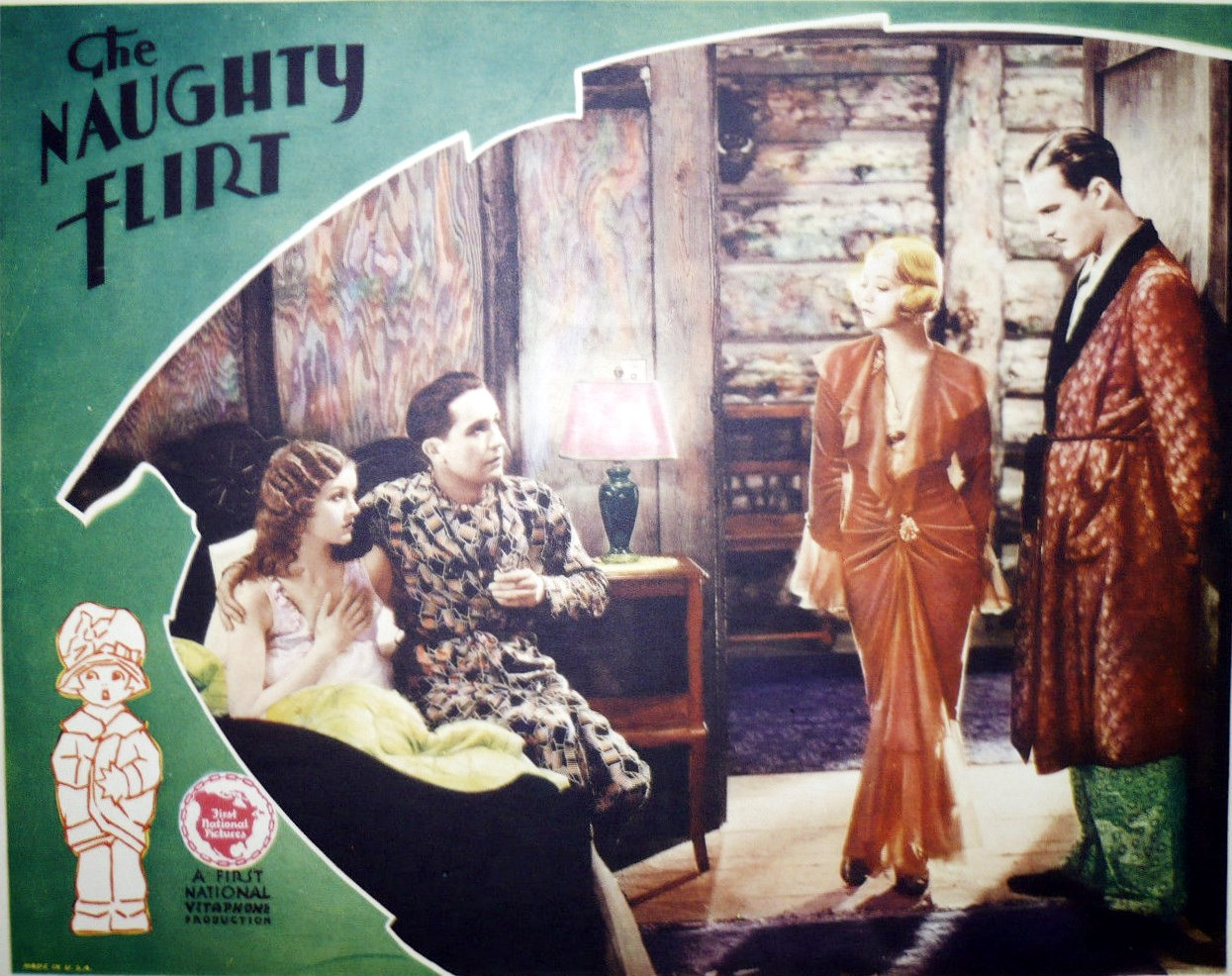
- Lobby card
- Directed by: Edward Cline
- Screenplay by: Richard Weil; Earl Baldwin
- Based on: "Man Crazy" by Frederick A. Bowen (uncredited)
- Starring: Alice White; Paul Page; Myrna Loy
- Cinematography: Sidney Hickox
- Edited by: Jack Rawlins
- Music by: Sam H. Stept (uncredited)
- Production company: First National Pictures
- Distributed by: Warner Bros. Pictures
- Release date: January 11, 1931
- Running time: 56 minutes
- Country: United States
- Language: English

The Naughty Flirt is a 1931 American pre-Code romantic comedy film directed by Edward Cline and starring Alice White, Paul Page and Myrna Loy.

== Plot ==
The Naughty Flirt (1931) (Note: Although the film was premiered in 1931, the notice on both the copyright registration and the film itself is late 1930, thus the film entered the public domain in 2026.)

Attorney Alan Ward is fed up with the reckless behavior of spoiled heiress Kay Elliott – the daughter of the head of his law firm – who is in love with him. Stung by his rejection, she eventually tells him to "Go jump in the lake." Seeing a chance to make up the money they lost in the stock market crash, a fortune-hunting brother and sister, Jack and Linda Gregory, get Kay to agree to marry Jack. At the altar, she announces that she still loves Alan, and he comes to his senses and realizes he loves her too.

== Cast ==
- Alice White as Katherine Constance "Kay" Elliott
- Paul Page as Alan Joseph Ward
- Myrna Loy as Linda Gregory
- Robert Agnew as Wilbur Fairchild
- Douglas Gilmore as John Thomas "Jack" Gregory
- George Irving as John Raleigh Elliott
- Sayre Dearing as Kay's Friend (uncredited)
- Geraldine Dvorak as Party Guest (uncredited)
- Thelma Hill as Friend (uncredited)
- Lloyd Ingraham as Judge Drake (uncredited)
- Jane Keckley as Office Cleaning Woman (uncredited)
- Fred Kelsey as Policeman in Paddy Wagon (uncredited)
- Marian Marsh as Kay's Friend (uncredited)

== Production ==
The film features one of Myrna Loy's early roles. Loy was 26 at the time and this was her last Warner Bros. film before moving on to Sam Goldwyn, then 20th Century Fox for a year, finally settling at MGM. Alice White, on the other hand, had already passed the prime of her career, which started in 1927.

== Reception ==
Press reception to the film was not positive, with The New York Times writing "It is as difficult to find something to praise as it is to find a needle in a haystack," and Variety echoing that the film "can be reduced to a dumb number falling for a guy that's hard to get and getting him... Four starting points and even more endings."

== Preservation status ==
The Naughty Flirt is preserved in the Library of Congress collection Packard Campus for Audio-Visual Conservation.
