= Broadway Babies =

1929 film

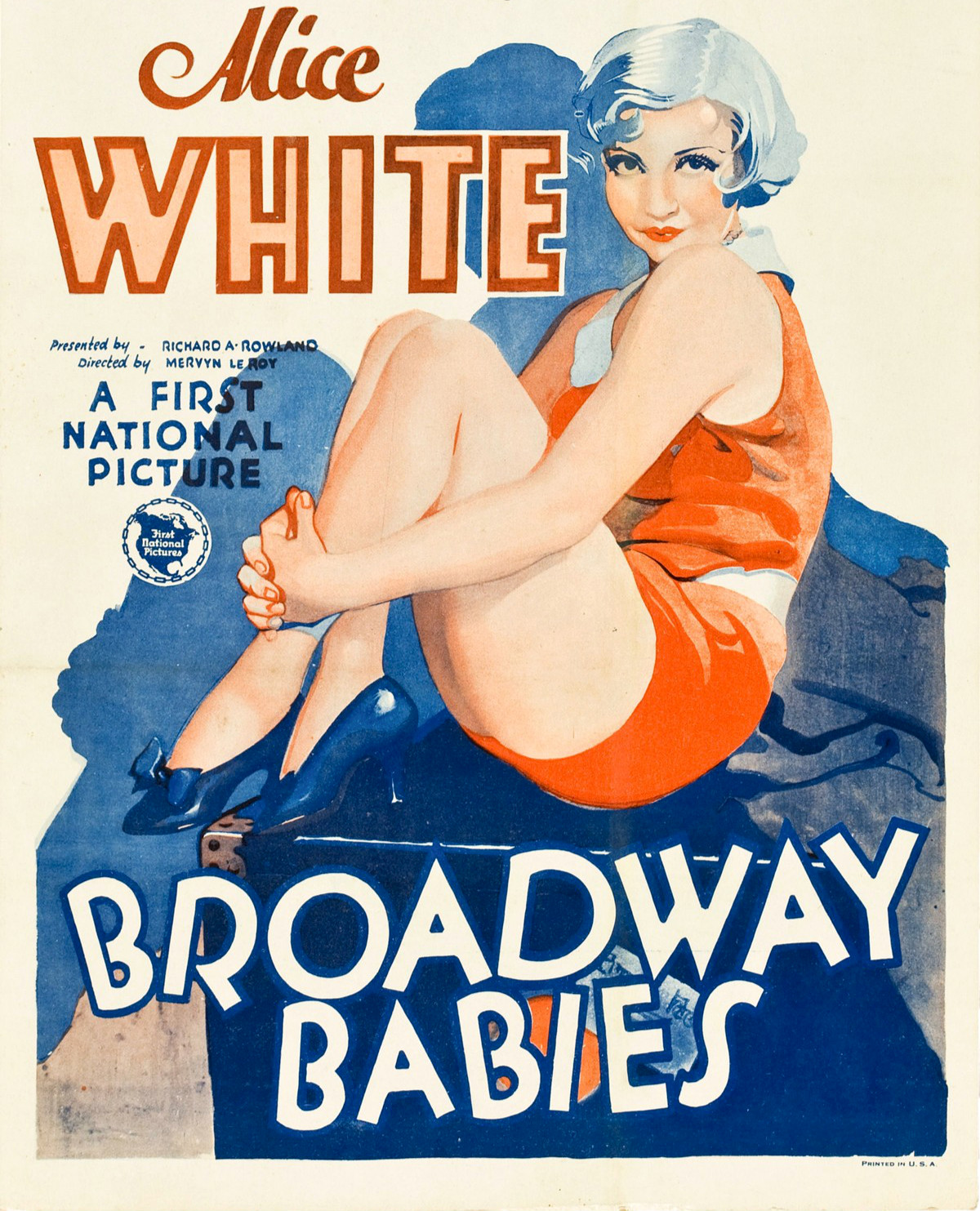
- Official poster
- Directed by: Mervyn LeRoy
- Screenplay by: Monte M. Katterjohn; Humphrey Pearson
- Based on: "Broadway Musketeers" by Jay Gelzer
- Produced by: Robert North
- Starring: Alice White
- Cinematography: Sol Polito
- Edited by: Frank Ware
- Music by: Leo F. Forbstein
- Production company: First National Pictures
- Distributed by: Warner Bros. Pictures
- Release dates: June 30, 1929 (sound); July 28, 1929 (silent)
- Running time: 86 minutes
- Country: United States
- Language: English

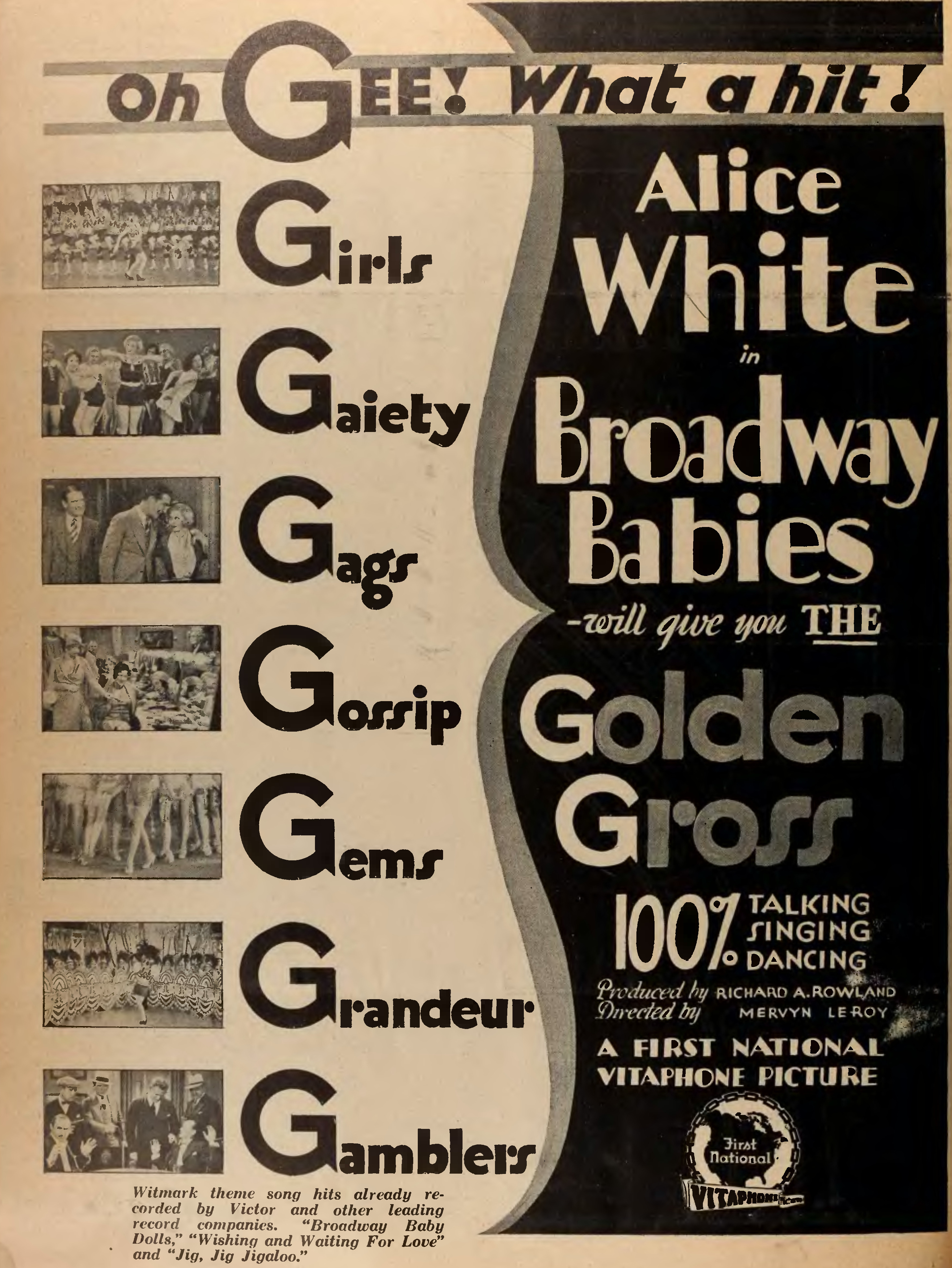
"Broadway Babies" ad in The Film Daily, 1929

Broadway Babies, aka Broadway Daddies (UK) and Ragazze d'America (Italy), is a 1929 all-talking Pre-Code black and white American musical drama film produced and distributed by First National Pictures, a subsidiary of Warner Bros. Pictures. The film was directed by Mervyn LeRoy and starred Alice White and Charles Delaney. This was White's first sound film with dialogue. As a copyright renewed work from 1929, the film entered the American public domain on January 1, 2025. (Note: Under R182904)

== Plot ==
Broadway Babies (1929)

Chorus girl Delight "Dee" Foster is in love with stage manager Billy Buvanny and he also loves her. They plan to marry until bootlegger Perc Gessant steps in. Dee is led to believe that Billy is in love with another girl, so she agrees to play around with Gessant when he becomes interested in her. When Gessant proposes marriage, Dee accepts. As they are about to be married, rival gangsters shoot Gessant and he ends up dying. Dee is reconciled with Billy and they become engaged.

== Cast ==
- Alice White as Delight "Dee" Foster
- Marion Byron as Florine Chanler
- Sally Eilers as Navarre King
- Charles Delaney as Billy Buvanny
- Tom Dugan as Scotty
- Bodil Rosing as Sarah Durgan
- Maurice Black as Nick Stepanos
- Fred Kohler as Perc Gessant
- Louis Natheaux as August 'Gus' Brand
- Lew Harvey as Joe, one of the poker players (uncredited)
- Aggie Herring as Landlady (uncredited)
- Al Hill as One of Perc's henchmen (uncredited)
- Armand Kaliz as Tony Ginetti, the nightclub manager (uncredited)

== Production ==
Broadway Babies was one of the many movie musicals with a Broadway setting that were made at the dawn of the "talkie" era. Such films were called "backstagers", a vogue that evolved during the emergence of sound pictures and from the success of The Jazz Singer (1927) and The Singing Fool (1928), both also Warner Bros.' films. Broadway Babies was also one of a number of similar vehicles created for Alice White; it was White's first all-sound as well as her most successful picture. The film was adapted from "Broadway Musketeers", a story by Jay Gelzer.

== Songs ==
- "Jig, Jig, Jigaloo"- lyrics by Al Bryan, music by George W. Meyer
- "Wishing and Waiting for Love"- lyrics by Grant Clarke, music by Harry Akst
- "Broadway Baby Dolls"- lyrics by Al Bryan, music by George W. Meyer

=== Incidental Scoring ===
- "Weary River"- lyrics by Grant Clarke, music by Louis Silvers (from the 1929 First National Pictures film "Weary River")
- "Give My Regards to Broadway" by George M. Cohan
- "Vesti La Giubba" by Ruggero Leoncavallo
- "Bridal Chorus" by Richard Wagner

== Preservation ==
As was common in the era, a silent version was also prepared for theatres not yet equipped for talkies. Only the sound version survives, as a 16mm reduction positive in the Library of Congress collection, although it has been preserved and is shown occasionally on Turner Classic Movies. The film's trailer also survives incomplete. The film was released on DVD by Warner Archive in 2017.

== See also ==
- List of early sound feature films (1926–1929)
- List of Warner Bros. films (1918–1929)
