= Daring Daughters =

1933 film directed by Christy Cabanne

- Directed by: Christy Cabanne
- Screenplay by: Barry Barringer; F. Hugh Herbert
- Story by: Sam Mintz
- Produced by: Sigmund Neufeld
- Starring: Marian Marsh; Kenneth Thomson; Joan Marsh
- Cinematography: Harry Forbes
- Edited by: Irving Birnbaum
- Production company: Tower Productions
- Release date: March 25, 1933 (US)
- Running time: 60 minutes
- Country: United States
- Language: English

Daring Daughters is a 1933 American pre-Code melodrama film, directed by Christy Cabanne. It stars Marian Marsh, Kenneth Thomson, and Joan Marsh, and was released on March 25, 1933.

== Plot ==
Terry Cummings is a cynical woman who feels that all men are only out to get one thing from women. When her younger sister, Betty, comes to visit her in the city with her boyfriend, Edgar Barrett, Marian disapproves of their engagement because she feels that Edgar does not make enough money. Meanwhile, Terry is pursued by Alan Preston, who works in his uncle's stockbroker office, which is in the same building as the cigar stand where Terry works. She is resistant to him at first, but eventually falls for him, despite her misgivings about all men.

Betty is invited to a party by a group of friends at the house of Joby Johnson, a notorious playboy. He gets her drunk, and tells her friends to put her in his bedroom to sleep it off, and then ushers them out of his home, intending to take advantage of Betty. However, his plans are thwarted when he realizes that one of the girls has remained behind to protect the drunken young lady, and she helps her home.

Realizing that her sister would be better off married, she asks Alan for a thousand dollars so that she can give it to Edgar so that he can start his own business. Alan gets the money from his uncle's brokerage firm, without telling his uncle. Later he replaces the funds, but it strains his relationship with Terry and the two break up. However, later they reconcile.

== Cast ==
- Marian Marsh as Terry Cummings
- Kenneth Thomson as Alan Preston
- Joan Marsh as Betty Cummings
- Bert Roach as Joby Johnson
- Allen Vincent as Edgar Barrett
- Lita Chevret as Gwen Moore
- Richard Tucker as Lawton
- Arthur Hoyt as Hubbard
- Florence Roberts as Grandmother
- Bryant Washburn Jr. as Roy Andrews

== Reception ==
The Film Daily gave the picture a poor review, stating, "Weak production fails to impress with rambling story lacking proper motivation." They felt it was a confusing script with weak direction, and only fair camera work. Harrison's Reports also gave it a negative review, calling it "mediocre" and "slow moving". They felt the characters were unsympathetic, and the sound and photography were poor. The Motion Picture Herald gave it a more positive review, stating it was a "very good program picture", with an "interesting story". They felt the acting was good, although they did feel that the plot was confusing at times.
