= Naughty Baby (film) =

1928 film by Mervyn LeRoy

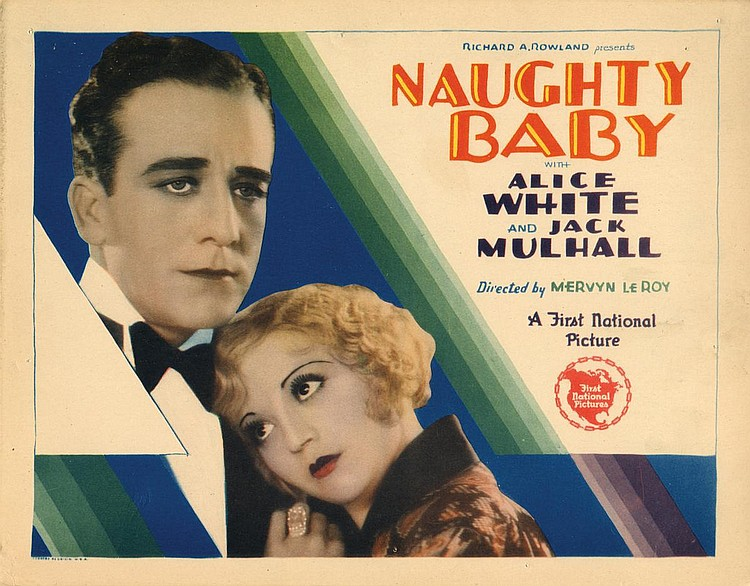
- Lobby card
- Directed by: Mervyn LeRoy
- Written by: Charles Beahan (story); Garrett Fort; Gerald Geraghty; Thomas J. Geraghty
- Starring: Alice White; Jack Mulhall; Thelma Todd; Doris Dawson; James Ford
- Cinematography: Ernest Haller
- Edited by: LeRoy Stone
- Music by: Gerard Carbonara
- Distributed by: First National Pictures
- Release date: December 16, 1928
- Running time: 7 reels
- Country: United States
- Language: Sound (Synchronized) (English Intertitles)

Naughty Baby is a 1928 American synchronized sound comedy film directed by Mervyn LeRoy and starring Alice White and Jack Mulhall. While the film has no audible dialog, it was released with a synchronized musical score with sound effects using the sound-on-disc Vitaphone process. It was released on December 16, 1928, by First National Pictures.

== Plot ==
Rosalind “Rosie” McGill works as a hat check girl at the luxurious Ritz Hotel. Alongside her loyal friend Polly, Rosie dreams of snagging a wealthy husband and leaving her humble circumstances behind.

Her opportunity arises when Terry Vandeveer, a charming and wealthy bachelor from Boston, arrives at the Ritz with his companion Tippy Grayson. In a bold move, Rosie “borrows” an expensive cloak from the check room, orchestrating a collision with Terry in order to catch his attention.

Learning that Terry will be spending the weekend at Long Beach, Rosie persuades her three hapless suitors — Joe Cassidy, Izzy Cohen, and Tony Caponi — to help her get there. Joe “borrows” a Rolls-Royce, Izzy loans her jewelry from the pawnshop where he works, and Tony supplies a fashionable bathing suit.

At the beach, Rosie’s plan works — Terry is smitten, and they go swimming together. But the flimsy “borrowed” bathing suit proves disastrous, tearing apart in the surf. Rosie is forced to stay offshore until a blanket can be delivered. A press photographer captures the moment, and a tabloid runs the story of a Boston millionaire saving a mysterious socialite from drowning.

Rosie, having fallen for Terry, writes to ask him to meet her in the park after her riding lesson. But Bonnie Le Vonne and Goldie Torres — savvy Manhattan girls with keys to Terry and Tippy’s suites — learn of Rosie’s scheme. Meanwhile, Terry discovers Rosie’s real identity and working-class background, but agrees to keep the appointment. Dressed in borrowed riding clothes, Rosie tries to maintain the charade, but falls off her horse — literally and figuratively — when her secret begins to unravel.

Quitting her job at the hotel before Terry can confront her, Rosie overhears Bonnie and Goldie plotting to trap Terry into marrying Bonnie by luring him across the state line. She races to warn him.

With the help of her “Three Musketeers,” Rosie crashes a hotel party — in the same suite where Terry is throwing his birthday celebration. Rosie wears a striking dress borrowed by Tony from Madame Fleurette’s fashion house. Fleurette appears at the party and recognizes the gown, pursuing Rosie through the hotel until everyone ends up in Terry’s room.

There, the truth unravels: Tony confesses to borrowing the gown, Izzy admits to pawning the jewelry, and Joe reveals the Rolls-Royce was also “borrowed.” Just as Bonnie tries to drag Terry away, a dishonored check marked “No Funds” arrives, leading her to abandon him — believing he’s just another pretender.

Terry, touched by Rosie’s sincerity, embraces her. Rosie assures him she doesn’t care if he has no money — just as his wealthy uncle arrives, revealing Terry’s allowance had simply temporarily been suspended, not his fortune. With the misunderstanding cleared, Rosie gets her rich husband after all — and one who truly loves her.

== Cast ==
- Alice White as Rosalind McGill
- Jack Mulhall as Terry Vandeveer
- Thelma Todd as Bonnie Le Vonne
- Doris Dawson as Polly
- James Ford as Terry's pal
- Natalie Joyce as Goldie Torres
- Frances Hamilton as Bonnie's pal
- Fred Kelsey as Dugan
- Rose Dione as Madame Fleurette
- Fanny Midgley as Mary Ellen Toolen
- Larry Banthim as Toolen
- Georgie Stone as Tony Caponi
- Benny Rubin as Benny Cohen
- Andy Devine as Joe Cassidy
- Raymond Turner as Terry's valet

== Music ==
The film featured the theme song entitled "I'm After That Baby" which was composed by Gerard Carbonara.

== Censorship ==
When Naughty Baby was released, many states and cities in the United States had censor boards that could require cuts or other eliminations before the film could be shown. The Kansas censor board ordered a cut of an intertitle with the caption, "Don't come near me. I've no more clothes on than a sardine."

== Preservation ==
The film was considered a lost film, with only the Vitaphone soundtrack still in existence. However, a print of Naughty Baby was discovered at the Museum of Modern Art film archive in 2017. A complete set of Vitaphone discs are in the film archive at the University of California, Los Angeles.

== See also ==
- List of early sound feature films (1926–1929)
