= Show Girl (1928 film) =

1928 film

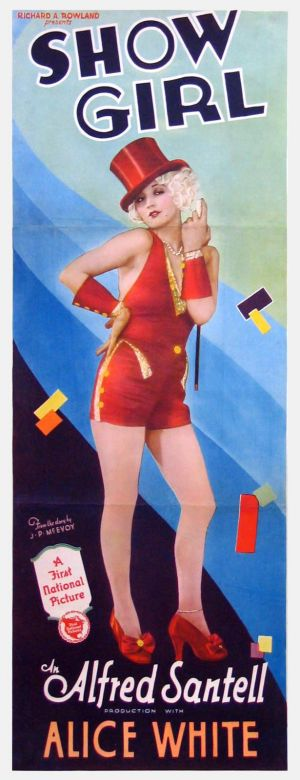
- theatrical insert card
- Directed by: Alfred Santell
- Screenplay by: James T. O'Donohue; George Marion (titles)
- Produced by: Richard A. Rowland
- Starring: Alice White; Donald Reed; Lee Moran
- Cinematography: Sol Polito
- Edited by: LeRoy Stone
- Music by: Joseph Meyer; Irving Caesar; Edward Grossman; Ted Ward
- Production company: First National Pictures
- Distributed by: Warner Bros. Pictures
- Release date: September 23, 1928
- Running time: 61 minutes
- Country: United States
- Language: Sound (Synchronized) (English Intertitles)

Show Girl is a 1928 American synchronized sound comedy-drama film starring Alice White and Donald Reed. While the film has no audible dialog, it was released with a synchronized musical score with sound effects using the sound-on-disc Vitaphone process. The film was based on the first of J. P. McEvoy's two Dixie Dugan novels, as was the 1929 musical. It was followed by a sequel, Show Girl in Hollywood (1930).

== Plot ==
Dixie Dugan, the vivacious and self-assured daughter of the working-class Dugan family, lives by her personal motto: "look hot but keep cool." She dreams of making it big on the stage and refuses to let love distract her from her goal.

Among her persistent suitors are Denny Kerrigan, a perky motto salesman who lives and breathes inspirational slogans, and Jimmy Doyle, a sharp-tongued, streetwise reporter for the Evening Tabloid. Both men vie for her attention, but Dixie is focused on fame, not romance.

When Dixie hears that producers Eppus and Kibbitzer are casting a new revue, she barges into their office. There, she encounters Jack Milton, a wealthy older man—a “sugar daddy” type—who is also angling to impress the producers. Using a clever ruse, Dixie sneaks into their meeting and shows off her charms in a daring one-piece bathing suit. The producers are impressed but advise her to gain experience in a nightclub first.

Milton offers to get her a job performing at the Jollity Club, and Dixie quickly proves she has star power. She sings, dances, and shares the spotlight with Alvarez Romano, a passionate performer from Chile who becomes romantically smitten with her. When Denny visits her at the club reciting a cascade of mottos, Dixie brushes him off. She also rebuffs Alvarez's advances and later accepts an invitation to Milton's apartment for champagne and lobster—but firmly rejects any inappropriate behavior.

After a few drinks, the mood turns dangerous when Alvarez bursts in, overcome with jealousy, and stabs Milton with a knife before fleeing the scene. Milton survives, and Dixie faints from the shock. Questioned by police, she's soon swept into the media frenzy as Jimmy Doyle turns her ordeal into sensational tabloid copy, selling her life story to the Evening Tabloid.

Back home in Brooklyn, the Dugans react to the scandal: Mr. Dugan believes the publicity will help Dixie's career, while Mrs. Dugan is convinced her daughter's life is ruined. Meanwhile, Dixie is abducted by Alvarez. In a stroke of fate, a car accident helps her escape—and she lands directly in Jimmy's arms. Seizing the opportunity, Jimmy convinces her to stay “kidnapped” to boost the story's publicity, resulting in a media sensation.

Later, when Milton finds Dixie and learns the truth, she confesses the stunt. Rather than express outrage, Milton agrees to finance a Broadway show Jimmy has written for her. Eppus and Kibbitzer produce it—though it's radically different from Jimmy's original script. This sparks a major quarrel between Jimmy and Dixie.

The show goes into grueling rehearsals and finally opens. Dixie is a triumph, but she hears nothing from Jimmy. Alone despite her success, she wonders what it was all for. At last, Jimmy returns, they reconcile, and marry—ready to face the chaos of Broadway together, this time as partners in both show business and life.

== Cast ==
- Alice White as Dixie Dugan
- Donald Reed as Alvarez Romano
- Lee Moran as Denny
- Charles Delaney as Jimmy
- Richard Tucker as Milton
- Gwen Lee as Nita Dugan
- James Finlayson as Mr. Dugan
- Kate Price as Mrs. Dugan
- Hugh Roman as Eppus
- Bernard Randall as Kibbitzer

== Music ==
The film featured a theme song which was entitled "She's One Sweet Show Girl" and was composed by Ted Ward and Edward Crossman. The song "Buy, Buy For Baby (Or Baby Will Bye Bye You)," which was composed by Joseph Meyer and Irving Caesar, was also featured on the soundtrack.

== Preservation ==
The film was considered a lost film, with only the Vitaphone soundtrack still in existence. However, a print was discovered in an Italian film archive, Cineteca Italiana, in 2015. A restored version, with the original Vitaphone soundtrack synched to the print, was screened at New York's Film Forum on October 25, 2016, marking the first time the film was publicly exhibited in 88 years.

== See also ==
- List of early sound feature films (1926–1929)
- List of early Warner Bros. sound and talking features
