= LeRoy Stone =

American screenwriter and film editor

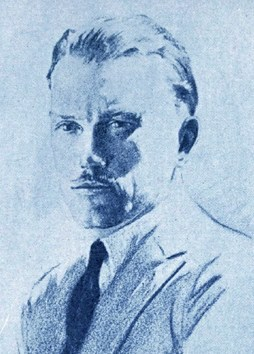
- Stone in 1921.
- Born: January 5, 1894; San Francisco, California, U.S.
- Died: September 15, 1949 (aged 55); Santa Monica, California, U.S.
- Occupation: Film editor
- Years active: 1916–1949

LeRoy Stone (January 5, 1894 – September 15, 1949) was an American film editor and a screenwriter.

He worked on over 60 films, being nominated at the 17th Academy Awards in the category of Best Film Editing for his work on the film Going My Way.

== Filmography ==
Film

- Civilization (1915)
- The Toll Gate (1920) (as Le Roy Stone)
- Sand! (1920)
- The Testing Block (1920)
- Skin Deep (1922)
- Eyes of the Forest (1923)
- Flowing Gold (1924)
- The Woman on the Jury (1924)
- Flirting with Love (1924)
- If I Marry Again (1925)
- The Talker (1925)
- The Lady Who Lied (1925)
- Sailors' Wives (1928)
- Harold Teen (1928)
- The Butter and Egg Man (1928)
- Show Girl (1928)
- Naughty Baby (1928)
- Children of the Ritz (1929)
- Prisoners (1929)
- Twin Beds (1929)
- Sally (uncredited) (1929)
- Bride of the Regiment (1930)
- Sunny (edited by) (1930)
- The Finger Points (1931)
- The Lady Who Dared (1931)
- Penrod and Sam (edited by) (1931)
- Make Me a Star (uncredited) (1932)
- The Phantom President (uncredited) (1932)
- If I Had a Million (uncredited) (1932)
- Duck Soup (uncredited) (1933)
- Six of a Kind (uncredited) (1934)
- Belle of the Nineties (1934)
- College Rhythm (1934)
- Goin' to Town (1935)
- The Milky Way (edited by) (1936)
- Early to Bed (1936)
- College Holiday (1936)
- Make Way for Tomorrow (edited by) (1937)
- Ebb Tide (1937)
- College Swing (1938)
- The Texans (1938)
- Say It in French (1938)
- Man About Town (1939)
- Adventure in Diamonds (1940)
- Buck Benny Rides Again (edited by) (1940)
- I Want a Divorce (1940)
- Love Thy Neighbor (1940)
- Skylark (1941)
- Louisiana Purchase (1941)
- Are Husbands Necessary? (1942)
- Wake Island (1942)
- Riding High (1943)
- True to Life (1943)
- Going My Way (as Leroy Stone) (1944)
- Murder, He Says (1945)
- Hold That Blonde (1945)
- Blue Skies (1946)
- Variety Girl (1947)
- Welcome Stranger (supervising editor) (1947)
- The Big Clock (1948)
- My Own True Love (1948)
- Isn't It Romantic (1948)
- My Friend Irma (1949)
- Chicago Deadline (1949)
- Appointment with Danger (1950)
