= Hop-Along Cassidy =

1935 film by Howard Bretherton

- Directed by: Howard Bretherton
- Screenplay by: Doris Schroeder; Harrison Jacobs
- Based on: Hopalong Cassidy; 1912 novel by Clarence E. Mulford
- Produced by: Harry Sherman
- Starring: William Boyd; James Ellison
- Cinematography: Archie Stout
- Edited by: Edward Schroeder
- Music by: Hugo Friedhofer
- Distributed by: Paramount Pictures
- Release date: August 25, 1935
- Running time: 60 minutes
- Country: United States
- Language: English

Hop-Along Cassidy (reissued as Hopalong Cassidy Enters) is a 1935 American Western film that features the character Hop-Along Cassidy created by writer Clarence E. Mulford. This is the first of 66 Hopalong Cassidy films produced between 1935 and 1948 and all starring William Boyd in the title role. William Boyd was originally offered the role of Buck Peters, the ranch foreman, but he decided to take the role of Hop-Along instead.

== Plot ==
A ranch foreman tries to start a range war by playing two cattlemen against each other whilst helping a gang rustle their cattle. Each of the cattlemen blames the other for stealing their cattle. Hop-Along Cassidy, played by William Boyd, having been shot in an earlier gunfight, (which results in his trademark hop), uses an altered cowhide brand to discover the real rustlers. The cattlemen join forces with Hop-Along to bring the rustlers to justice.

== Cast ==
- William Boyd - Bill "Hop-Along" Cassidy
- James Ellison - Johnny Nelson
- Paula Stone - Mary Meeker
- George Hayes - Uncle Ben
- Kenneth Thomson - "Pecos" Jack Anthony
- Frank McGlynn Jr. - Red Connors
- Charles Middleton - Buck Peters
- Robert Warwick - Jim Meeker

== Accolades ==
The film is recognized by American Film Institute in these lists:

- 2003: AFI's 100 Years...100 Heroes & Villains:
  - Bill "Hop-Along" Cassidy – Nominated Hero
