= Kenneth Thomson (actor) =

American actor (1899–1967)

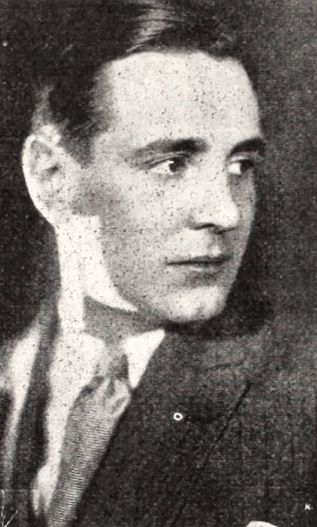
- From a 1926 magazine
- Born: Charles Kenneth Thomson; January 7, 1899; Pittsburgh, Pennsylvania, U.S.
- Died: January 26, 1967 (aged 68); Hollywood, California, U.S.
- Education: Carnegie Institute of Technology
- Occupation: Actor
- Years active: 1926–1937
- Spouse: Alden Gay (1928 - ?)

Charles Kenneth Thomson (January 7, 1899 – January 26, 1967) was an American character actor active on stage and on film during the silent and early sound film eras.

== Early years ==
Born in Pittsburgh, Thomson was the son of Edith Taylor Thomson, a concert manager, who raised him alone after his father died when Kenneth was seven years old. As a youth, he worked as a copy boy at the Pittsburgh Leader and helped to distribute publicity material for concerts that his mother arranged. Later, he worked for a steel company and an insurance company

During World War I, Thomson was in the United States Marine Corps, with his service including being a gunner on the cruiser USS Frederick. At the war's end, he went to the Norfolk Navy Yard until he was discharged. After returning to Pittsburgh, he re-enrolled at Carnegie Institute of Technology (CIT), He acted in plays at the institute and graduated from CIT's Drama School,

== Career ==
After graduation from CIT, Thomson worked as an extra and assistant stage manager with a stock theater company in Lakewood, Maine, for several summers. He also acted with Ethel Barrymore in a touring production of Declassee. During subsequent winters he acted in plays that included Shavings and The Emperor Jones. During a winter on the Pacific coast, he acted in a touring production of Three Wise Fools. He later acted with a stock company headed by Margaret Anglin.

Following his West Coast performance in The Rivals, Thomson declined a contract offer to work in films from Cecil B. DeMille, Returning to New York, Thomson acted in Hush Money with Henry Miller's company., following which he accepted a two-year contract offer from DeMille.

Thomson and his wife, Alden Gay, were founding members of the Screen Actors Guild. The group was founded after meetings held at the Thomsons' home during 1933. He was the group's secretary and its magazine's managing editor.

During Thomson's 12-year career in front of the camera, he appeared in over 60 films. After appearing in several Broadway plays during the early and mid-1920s, Thomson would make his film debut with a starring role in 1926's Risky Business. Over the next four years, he appeared in more than a dozen films, in either starring or featured roles. In 1930 alone he would appear in 10 films, half of which were in starring roles, such as Lawful Larceny, which also starred Bebe Daniels and Lowell Sherman (who also directed), and Reno, whose other stars were Ruth Roland and Montagu Love; the other half had him in featured roles as in A Notorious Affair, starring Billie Dove, Basil Rathbone, and Kay Francis. During the rest of the 1930s, he appeared in numerous films, mostly in either supporting or featured roles, such as The Little Giant (1933), starring Edward G. Robinson and Mary Astor, and Hop-Along Cassidy (1935), starring William Boyd; although he occasionally had a starring role, as in opposite Harold Lloyd in 1932's Movie Crazy. In 1933 he worked in a theatre founded by Harold Lloyd and others, acting in The Good Fairy by Ferenc Molnár at Lloyd's Beverly Hills Little Theatre for Professionals.

On Broadway, Thomson appeared in The Great Broxopp (1921), The Czarina (1922), and Hush Money (1926).

== Personal life and death ==
Thomson married actress Alden Gay in 1928. On January 26, 1967, Thomson died in Hollywood Presbyterian Hospital at age 67.

== Filmography ==
(Per AFI database)

- Corporal Kate (1926) as Jack Clarke
- Risky Business (1926) as Ted Pyncheon M.D.
- Man Bait (1927) as Gerald Sanford
- Turkish Delight (1927) as Donald Sims
- White Gold (1927) as Alec Carson
- Almost Human (1927) as John Livingston
- The King of Kings (1927) as Lazarus
- The Secret Hour (1928) as Joe
- The Street of Illusion (1928) as Curtis Drake
- The Bellamy Trial (1929) as Stephen Bellamy
- The Broadway Melody (1929) as Jacques Warriner (uncredited)
- The Careless Age (1929) as Owen
- The Girl from Havana (1929) as William Dane
- The Letter (1929)
- Say It with Songs (1929) as Arthur Phillips
- The Veiled Woman (1929) as Dr. Donald Ross
- Children of Pleasure (1930) as Rod Peck
- The Doorway to Hell (1930) as Captain of academy
- Just Imagine (1930) as MT-3
- Lawful Larceny (1930) as Andrew Dorsey
- A Notorious Affair (1930) as Dr. Alan Pomeroy
- The Other Tomorrow (1930) as Nort Larrison
- Reno (1930) as Richard Belden
- Sweet Mama (1930) as Joe Palmer
- Sweethearts on Parade (1930) as Hendricks
- Wild Company (1930) as Joe Hardy
- Bad Company (1931) as Barnes - Henchman
- Murder at Midnight (1931) as Jim Kennedy
- Woman Hungry (1931) as Leonard Temple
- Up for Murder (1931) as William's Daughter's Boyfriend (uncredited)
- Thirteen Women (1932) as Mr. Cousins (uncredited)
- Movie Crazy (1932) as Vance
- Man Wanted (1932) as Fred 'Freddie' Ames
- The Famous Ferguson Case (1932) as Bob Parks
- Her Mad Night (1932) as Schuyler Durkin
- 70,000 Witnesses (1932) as Dr. Collins
- Fast Life (1932) as Mr. Williams
- By Whose Hand? (1932) as Chambers
- Lawyer Man (1932) as Dr. Frank Gresham (uncredited)
- The Little Giant (1933) as John Stanley
- Female (1933) as Red
- Daring Daughters (1933) as Alan Preston
- Son of a Sailor (1933) as Williams
- From Headquarters (1933) as Gordon Bates
- Jungle Bride (1933) as John Franklin
- Sitting Pretty (1933) as Norman Lubin (uncredited)
- Hold Me Tight (1933) as Dolan (uncredited)
- Gallant Lady (1933) as Minor Role (scenes deleted)
- Behold My Wife! (1934) as Jim Curson
- In Old Santa Fe (1934) as Matt Korber - alias Mr. Chandler
- Cross Streets (1934) as Mort Talbot
- Many Happy Returns (1934) as Motion Picture Director
- Change of Heart (1934) as Howard Jackson
- Behind the Green Lights (1935) as Charles T. 'Ritzy' Conrad
- Manhattan Butterfly (1935) as A Gangster
- Whispering Smith Speaks (1935) as J. Wesley Hunt
- Hop-Along Cassidy (1935) as Jack Anthony
- Blackmailer (1936) as Mr. Porter
- With Love and Kisses (1936) as Gangster
- Jim Hanvey, Detective (1937) as W.B. Elwood
- Criminal Lawyer (1937) as First Trial Witness (uncredited)
