= The Other Tomorrow =

1930 film

- Theatrical release poster
- Directed by: Lloyd Bacon
- Written by: Fred Myton (adaptation)
- Screenplay by: James Starr (& titles)
- Story by: Octavus Roy Cohen
- Starring: Billie Dove; Kenneth Thomson; Grant Withers
- Cinematography: Lee Garmes
- Production company: First National Pictures
- Distributed by: Warner Bros. Pictures
- Release date: February 9, 1930
- Running time: 65 minutes
- Country: United States
- Language: English
- Budget: $172,000
- Box office: $366,000

The Other Tomorrow is a lost 1930 American pre-Code film, directed by Lloyd Bacon and produced by First National Pictures, a subsidiary of Warner Bros. Pictures. The love-triangle drama, from a story by Octavus Roy Cohen, stars Billie Dove, Kenneth Thomson, and Grant Withers.

== Plot ==
The story takes place in a small town in Georgia. Edith is a girl who has loved Jim Carter since childhood. One day they get into a quarrel and an older and very wealthy man, Norton Larrison, seizes the opportunity to court Edith.

Larrison succeeds in making Edith forget Jim temporarily. Edith marries Larrison and then go to Europe on their honeymoon. Soon after they return to Georgia, Edith discovers that she is still in love with Jim. She is determined, however, to be a faithful wife and vows to hide her love for Jim. One day Larrison overhears a conversation to the effect that Jim can never forget his love for Edith. Harrison becomes increasingly suspicious of his wife. It finally reaches the point where he manages to kill all the respect and love that Edith held for him as her husband. The picture comes to a climax as both Norton and Jim each vows to kill the other.

== Cast ==
- Billie Dove as Edith Larrison
- Kenneth Thomson as Norton Larrison
- Grant Withers as Jim Carter
- Frank Sheridan as Dave Weaver
- William Granger as Drum Edge
- Otto Hoffman as Ted Journet
- Scott Seaton as Ed Conover

== Box Office ==
According to Warner Bros the film earned $267,000 domestically and $99,000 foreign.

== Preservation status ==
The Other Tomorrow is a lost film. No prints are currently known to exist.

== See also ==
- List of lost films
