= Compromise (film) =

1925 film by Alan Crosland

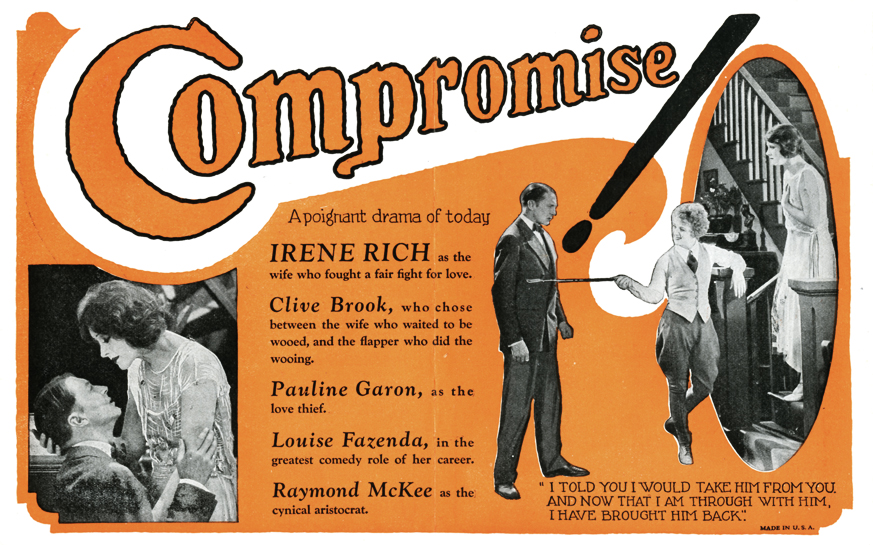
- Advertisement
- Directed by: Alan Crosland
- Written by: Edward T. Lowe, Jr. (scenario)
- Based on: Compromise by Jay Gelzer
- Starring: Irene Rich; Clive Brook; Louise Fazenda
- Cinematography: David Abel
- Production company: Warner Bros.
- Distributed by: Warner Bros.
- Release date: October 24, 1925
- Running time: 7 reels (6,789 feet)
- Country: United States
- Language: Silent (English intertitles)

Compromise is a 1925 American silent drama film directed by Alan Crosland and produced and distributed by Warner Bros. The film was based on the 1923 novel of the same name by Jay Gelzer.

== Plot ==
As described in a review in a film magazine, Joan, a woman of high ideals, from childhood has had to play second fiddle to her selfish, pampered half-sister. Joan expects marriage to bring happiness and it does for a time, but Nathalie, the sister, true to form, schemes to win Joan's husband Alan and succeeds, and, not content with this, arranges a surprise meeting to gloat over her conquest. Symbolic of the conflict between husband, wife and sister, there is a terrific cyclone which brings to Joan a realization of the truth of the theme and she forgives Alan.

== Cast ==
- Irene Rich as Joan Trevore
- Clive Brook as Alan Thayer
- Louise Fazenda as Hilda
- Pauline Garon as Nathalie
- Raymond McKee as Cholly
- Helen Dunbar as Aunt Catherine
- Winter Hall as Joan's father
- Edward Martindel as Commodore Smithson
- Lynn Cowan as James
- Frank Butler as Ole
- Muriel Frances Dana as Nathalie, as a child
- Dorothy Seay as Joan Trevore, as a Child
- Annabelle Magnus as Little Girl (uncredited)

== Preservation ==
With no prints of Compromise located in any film archives, it is a lost film.

== See also ==
- List of lost films
