= The Sea Tiger =

1927 film

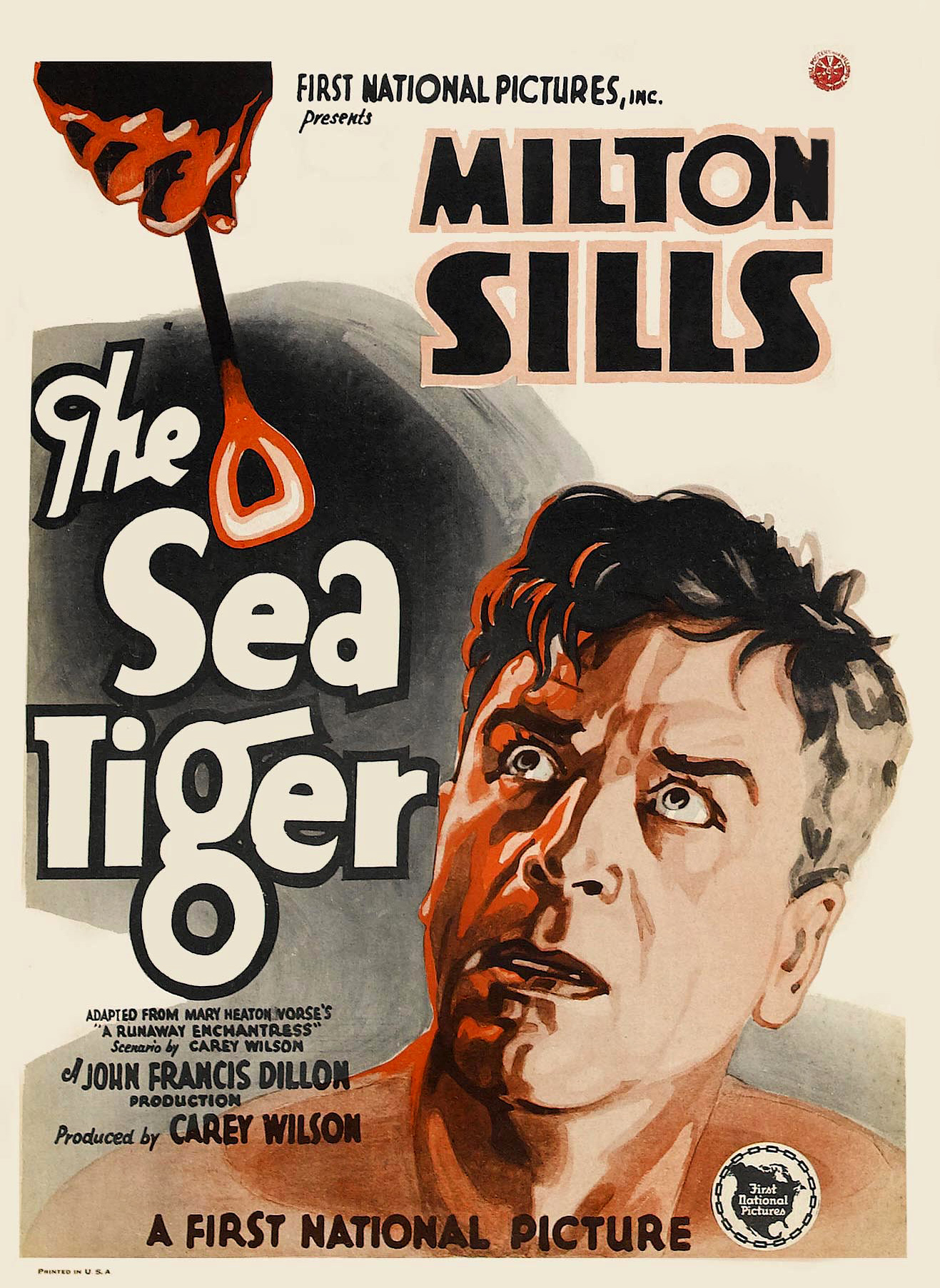
- 1927 theatrical poster
- Directed by: John Francis Dillon
- Written by: Carey Wilson (scenario)
- Based on: "A Runaway Enchantress" by Mary Heaton Vorse
- Produced by: Carey Wilson
- Starring: Milton Sills; Mary Astor
- Cinematography: Charles Van Enger
- Production company: First National Pictures
- Distributed by: First National Pictures
- Release date: February 27, 1927
- Running time: 6 reels, 5,606 feet
- Country: United States
- Language: Silent (English intertitles)

The Sea Tiger is a 1927 American silent drama film produced and distributed by First National Pictures and directed by John Francis Dillon. The film stars Milton Sills and Mary Astor. It is now a lost film.

The film is also known under the title of its source material, The Runaway Enchantress.

== Cast ==
- Milton Sills as Justin Ramos
- Mary Astor as Amy Cortissos
- Larry Kent as Charles Ramos
- Alice White as Manuella
- Kate Price as Bridget
- Arthur Stone as Enos
- Emily Fitzroy as Mrs. Enos
- Joe Bonomo as Sebastiano
