= James Ford (actor) =

James Ford with Dorothy Mackaill in Children of the Ritz.

James Ford (Lawrence, Massachusetts March 21, 1903 – San Diego February 13, 1977) was an American actor in silent and sound films.

== Selected filmography ==
- Outcast (1928), directed by William Seiter
- Naughty Baby (1928)
- Wizard of the Saddle (1928)
- Prisoners (1929)
- Making the Grade (1929)
- House of Horror (1929)
- Children of the Ritz (1929)
