= Reaching for the Sun =

1941 film by William A. Wellman

- Theatrical release poster
- Directed by: William A. Wellman
- Screenplay by: W.L. River
- Produced by: William A. Wellman
- Starring: Joel McCrea; Ellen Drew; Eddie Bracken; Albert Dekker; Billy Gilbert; George Chandler; Bodil Ann Rosing
- Cinematography: William C. Mellor
- Edited by: Thomas Scott
- Music by: Victor Young
- Production company: Paramount Pictures
- Distributed by: Paramount Pictures
- Release date: May 2, 1941
- Running time: 90 minutes
- Country: United States
- Language: English

Reaching for the Sun is a 1941 American comedy film directed by William A. Wellman and written by W.L. River. The film stars Joel McCrea, Ellen Drew, Eddie Bracken, Albert Dekker, Billy Gilbert, George Chandler and Bodil Ann Rosing. The film was released on May 2, 1941, by Paramount Pictures.

== Plot ==
Backwoods boy Russ Elliott goes to the big city of Detroit, hoping to earn enough money to buy an outboard motor for his boat. He meets waitress Rita at a diner, after which, In the unemployment line, he befriends Benny Hogan as both land jobs on a factory's assembly line.

Russ and Rita begin a romance and get married. They have a child and Russ saves enough money to buy his outboard motor. He is unhappy at the plant, where a brute named Herman resents him and even tries to do Russ physical harm. Rita is unhappy, too, particularly after the factory's closure, when Russ and their boarder, Benny, are out of work for months.

Russ wants to return to his roots. Rita prefers life in Detroit and insists he sell his outboard motor. The factory reopens, but Herman causes an accident that costs Russ a leg. Rita agrees to make him happy by returning to his woodland home and boat, with Benny tagging along.

== Cast ==
- Joel McCrea as Russ Elliot
- Ellen Drew as Rita
- Eddie Bracken as Benny Hogan
- Albert Dekker as Herman
- Billy Gilbert as Amos
- George Chandler as Jerryas Jerry
- Bodil Rosing as Rita's Mother
- James Burke as Norm
- Charles D. Brown as Johnson
- Regis Toomey as Intern
- Nella Walker as Nurse
- Adrian Morris as Rita's Partner, Dance Hall

== Bibliography ==
- Thompson, Frank T. William A. Wellman. Scarecrow Press, 1983.
