= Golla Hammerich =

Danish concert pianist

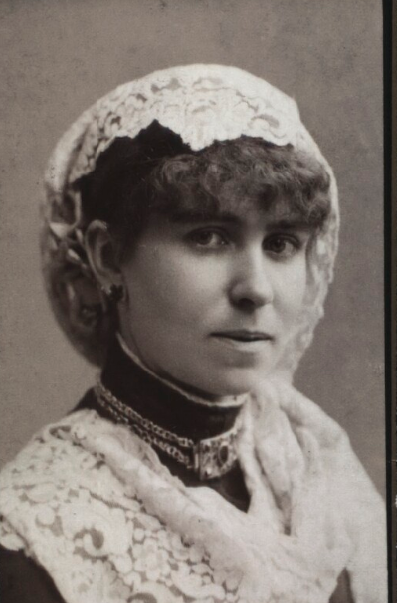
Golla Hammerich (1882)

Golla Andrea Hammerich née Bodenhoff Jensen (1854–1903) was a prominent Danish concert pianist who had studied under leading Danish musicians. It was not, however, until she was 35 that she first appeared in public. In 1895, she played a leading role in organizing the Copenhagen Women's Exhibition where she performed works composed by women. Hammerich was active in the Danish Music Pedagogical Association (Dansk Musikpædagogisk Forening) and contributed to various journals.

== Early life, family and education ==
Born in Roskilde on 1 November 1854, Golla Andrea Bodenhoff Jensen was the daughter of the specialist physician Hans Peter Jensen (1818–95) and his wife Golla Hermandine née Rosing Bodenhoff (1820–1906). In May 1874, she married the music historian Angul Hammerich (1848–1931). Together they had two children, Bodil (1876) and Kaj Frederik (1877). She took piano lessons under Orpheline Olsen and later under C.F.E. Horneman, Franz Neruda and August Winding.

== Career ==
After her marriage in 1874, Hammerich devoted her time to the home and bringing up her children. Although she continued to practice chamber music at home with prominent musicians, it was not until she was in her mid-thirties that she first appeared in public, soon becoming one of the country's leading pianists.

In 1895, Hammerich was one of the principal organizers of the International Women's Exhibition which set out to promote the contributions of Scandinavian women to culture. She gave concerts of works composed by women and published a collection of their songs.

Her success at the exhibition led to many more concerts, including first performances of piano music by Edvard Grieg in Horning & Møller's Concert Hall in 1886. In 1888, she appeared with the violinist Frederik Hilmer and the cellist Ernst Høeberg in a concert including music by the Russian composer Anton Arensky.

Golla Hammerich died in Copenhagen on 1 May 1903.
