= Sweethearts on Parade (1930 film) =

1930 film

- Directed by: Marshall Neilan
- Written by: Alfred A. Cohn; Colin Clements; Jimmy Starr
- Produced by: Al Christie
- Starring: Alice White; Lloyd Hughes; Marie Prevost
- Cinematography: Gus Peterson
- Edited by: Sidney J. Walsh
- Production company: Columbia Pictures
- Distributed by: Columbia Pictures
- Release date: September 28, 1930
- Running time: 65 minutes
- Country: United States
- Language: English

Sweethearts on Parade is a 1930 American pre-Code musical comedy film directed by Marshall Neilan and starring Alice White, Lloyd Hughes, and Marie Prevost. It was inspired by the Guy Lombardo recording "Sweethearts on Parade," a tune also adopted by Louis Armstrong in 1930.

== Plot ==
Helen and Nita work dressing windows in a department store, where Helen attracts the attention of both a marine and a millionaire.

== Cast ==
- Alice White as Helen
- Lloyd Hughes as Bill
- Marie Prevost as Nita
- Kenneth Thomson as Hendricks
- Ray Cooke as Hank
- Wilbur Mack as Parker
- Ernest Wood as Denham
- Max Asher as Store Manager

== Bibliography ==
- Darby, William. Masters of Lens and Light: A Checklist of Major Cinematographers and Their Feature Films. Scarecrow Press, 1991.
