= The Big Noise (1928 film) =

1928 film by Allan Dwan

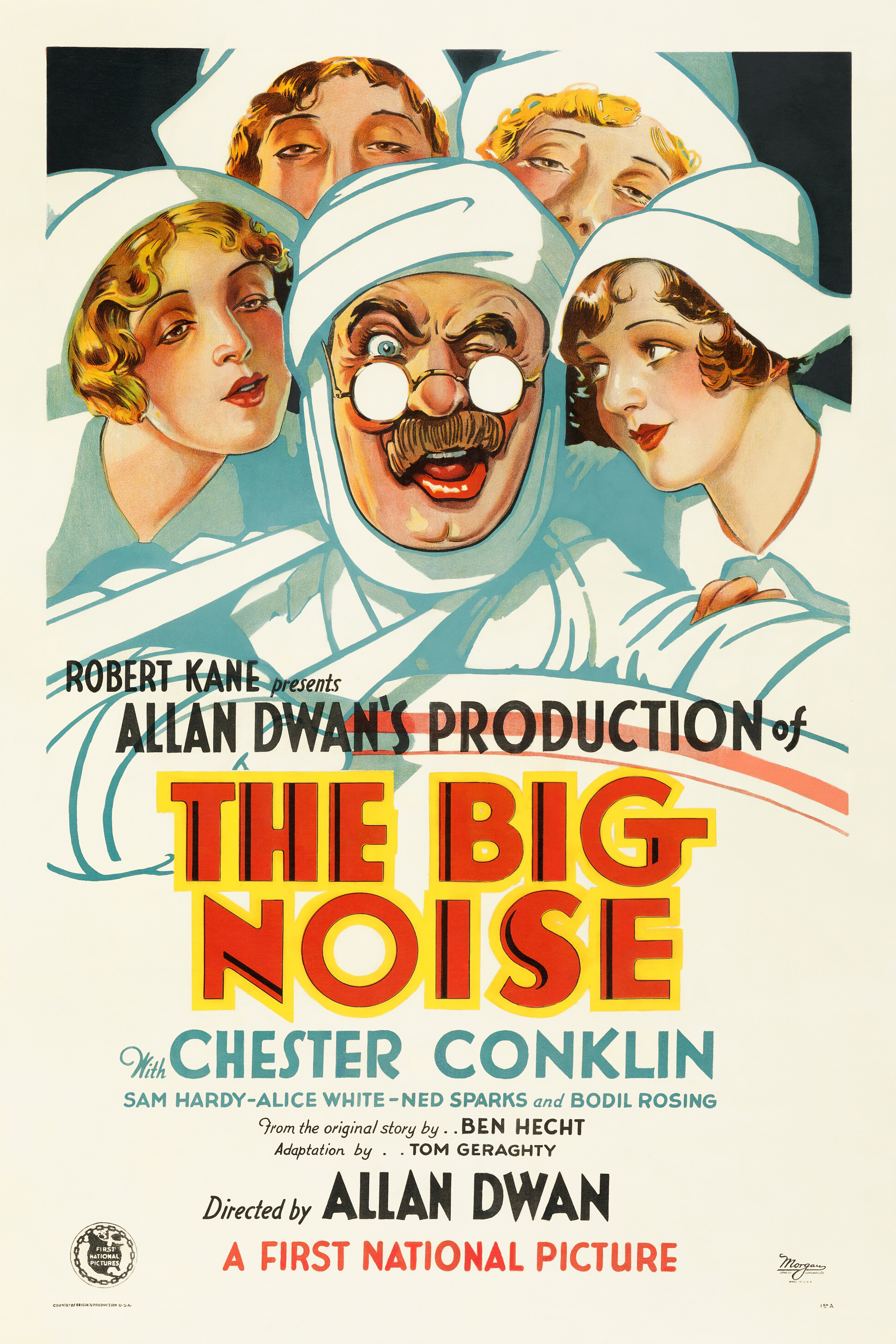
- Directed by: Allan Dwan
- Written by: Thomas J. Geraghty; Ben Hecht; Allan Dwan
- Produced by: Allan Dwan
- Starring: Chester Conklin; Alice White; Bodil Rosing
- Edited by: Doris Farrington; Terry Morse
- Production company: First National Pictures
- Distributed by: First National Pictures
- Release date: March 25, 1928
- Running time: 80 minutes
- Country: United States
- Languages: Silent; English intertitles

The Big Noise is a lost 1928 American silent comedy film directed by Allan Dwan and starring Chester Conklin, Alice White and Bodil Rosing.

== Plot ==
John Sloval is a guard in the New York subway. He wishes that Philip Hurd, from Coney Island, marries his daughter Sophie. But the latter loves Bill Hedges, the son of a wealthy land owner in upstate New York.

== Cast ==
- Chester Conklin as John Sloval
- Alice White as Sophie Sloval, his daughter
- Bodil Rosing as Ma Sloval, his wife
- Sam Hardy as Philip Hurd
- Jack Egan as Bill Hedges
- Ned Sparks as William Howard, newspaper editor; the role is Sparks's first performance in a talkie
- David Torrence as Managing Editor of Howard's newspaper

== Preservation ==
With no holdings located in archives, The Big Noise is considered a lost film.

== Bibliography ==
- Frederic Lombardi. Allan Dwan and the Rise and Decline of the Hollywood Studios. McFarland, 2013.
- Alexander Walker, Vanity Fair, April 1929, p . 79 . 40 , p . 46
