= Showgirl in Hollywood =

1930 musical film

Showgirl In Hollywood
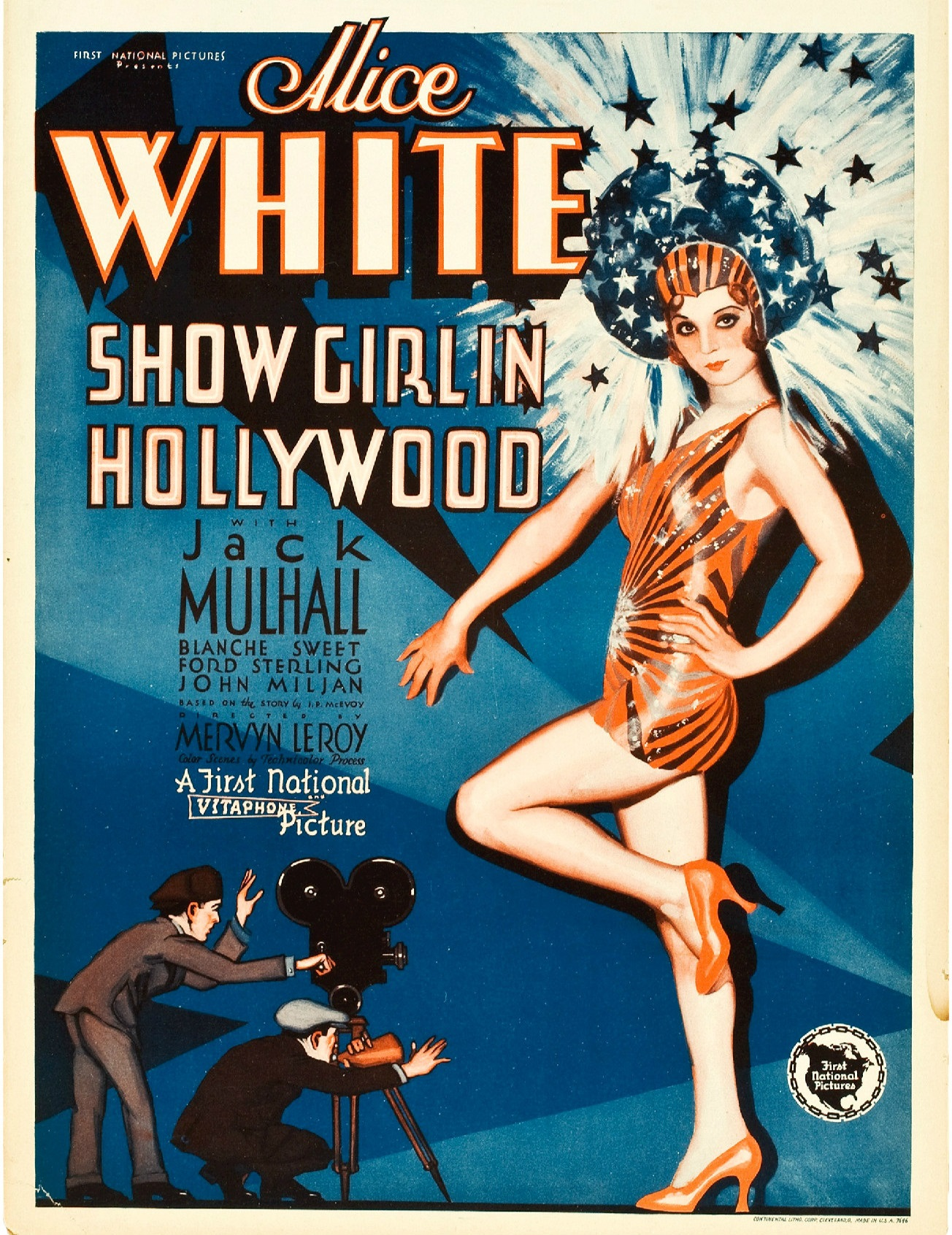
- Theatrical release poster
- Directed by: Mervyn LeRoy
- Written by: Adaptation: Harvey F. Thew; James A. Starr; Dialogue: Harvey F. Thew
- Based on: Hollywood Girl by J. P. McEvoy
- Produced by: Robert North
- Starring: Alice White
- Cinematography: Sol Polito
- Edited by: Pete Fritch
- Music by: Joseph Burke; Ray Henderson
- Color process: Black and white Technicolor (last reel only)
- Production company: First National Pictures
- Distributed by: First National Pictures
- Release date: April 20, 1930 (US)
- Running time: 77 minutes
- Country: United States
- Language: English

Showgirl in Hollywood is a 1930 American pre-Code musical film with Technicolor sequences, produced and distributed by First National Pictures, a subsidiary of Warner Bros. Pictures. The film stars Alice White, Jack Mulhall, and Blanche Sweet. It was adapted from the 1929 novel Hollywood Girl by J.P. McEvoy.

Al Jolson, Ruby Keeler, Noah Beery, Walter Pidgeon, and Loretta Young make cameo appearances in the final reel, which was photographed in Technicolor. Showgirl in Hollywood is a sequel to the 1928 Warner Bros. silent film Show Girl, which starred Alice White as Dixie Dugan.

A French version of the film, titled Le masque d'Hollywood, was directed by Clarence G. Badger and John Daumery.

== Plot ==
When the film begins, a musical show closed down before it has had a chance to open. Jimmie Doyle, who wrote the musical intends to rewrite it, and his girlfriend Dixie Dugan, fed up at wasting her time for a show that never opened, is intent on finding a new career. While at a nightclub, Dixie does a musical number and catches the eye of Frank Buelow, a Hollywood director. Buelow persuades Dixie to go to Hollywood, where he will have a part waiting for her in his upcoming films.

Dixie takes the next train to California. When she arrives, she is disappointed to find that Buelow has been fired from the studio and that there is no part for her. Dixie meets Donny Harris, a former star who is out of work because she is considered "as old as the hills" at the age of 32. Soon after, Dixie discovers that Jimmie Doyle is in Hollywood because one of the film studios had bought the film rights to his musical play. Jimmie had insisted that Dixie be given the lead in the film version of his play. The film goes into production, and Dixie manages to get Donny included in the cast.

One day, Dixie meets Frank Buelow at a restaurant and tells her that he is now working for another studio. Through his influence, Buelow manages to change Dixie into a temperamental and conceited actress, and this change leads to complications that almost end her film career.

== Cast ==
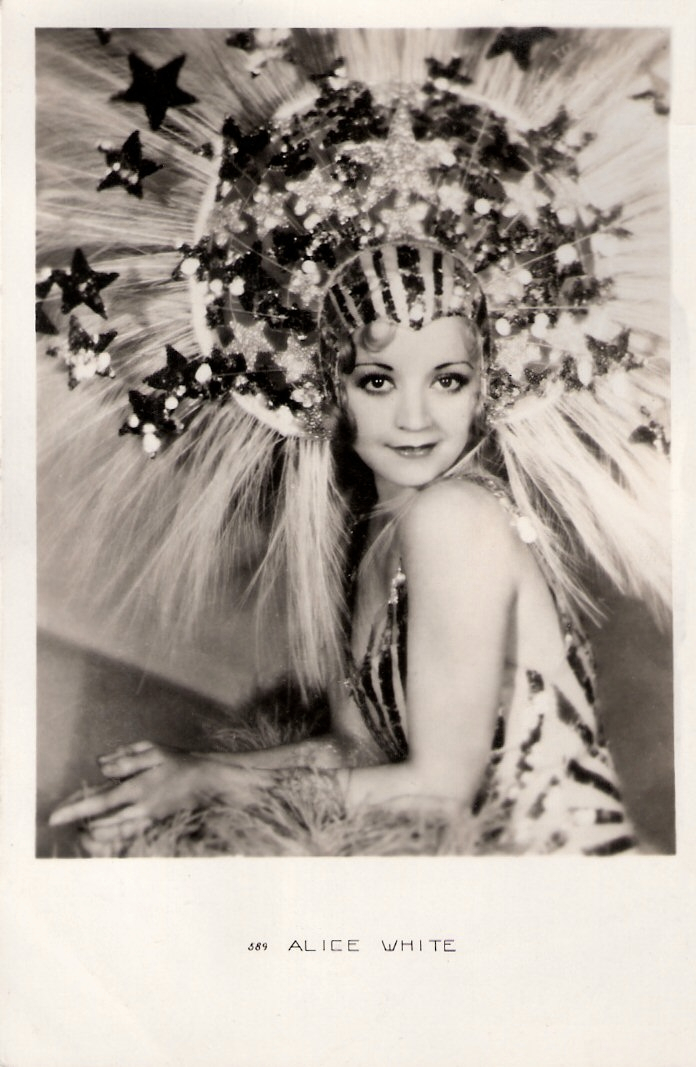
Alice White in a promotional photograph

- Alice White as Dixie Dugan
- Jack Mulhall as Jimmy Doyle
- Blanche Sweet as Donny Harris (Mrs. Buelow)
- Ford Sterling as Sam Otis, film producer
- John Miljan as Frank Buelow, a director
- Virginia Sale as Miss J. Rule, Otis' secretary
- Lee Shumway as Mr. Kramer
- Herman Bing as Bing, assistant director

=== Cameos ===
- Al Jolson
- Ruby Keeler
- Noah Beery
- Noah Beery Jr.
- Walter Pidgeon
- Loretta Young
- Natalie Moorhead
- Jane Winton

== Songs ==
- "I've Got My Eye on You"
- "Hang onto a Rainbow"
- "There's a Tear for Every Smile in Hollywood"
- "Merrily We Roll Along"
- "Buy, Buy for Baby" (Or "Baby Will Bye Bye You")

== Reception ==
Showgirl in Hollywood received good reviews. Photoplay called the film Alice White's best sound film and described it as "first-rate entertainment, in spite of a soggy spot or two."

== Preservation ==
The film only survives in a black-and-white copy. The last reel was filmed in Technicolor but is considered lost.

== Home media ==
Showgirl in Hollywood was released on DVD as part of the Warner Archive Collection in December 2009.

== See also ==
- List of early color feature films
- Blanche Sweet filmography
