= Movie Crazy =

1932 film

- Original Poster
- Directed by: Clyde Bruckman; Harold Lloyd (uncredited)
- Written by: Vincent Lawrence
- Produced by: Harold Lloyd (uncredited)
- Starring: Harold Lloyd; Constance Cummings; Kenneth Thomson
- Cinematography: Walter Lundin
- Edited by: Bernard W. Burton
- Music by: Alfred Newman (uncredited)
- Production company: The Harold Lloyd Film Corporation
- Distributed by: Paramount Pictures
- Release date: August 12, 1932
- Running time: 98 minutes
- Country: United States
- Language: English
- Budget: $675,353
- Box office: $1,439,000

Movie Crazy is a 1932 American Pre-Code comedy film starring Harold Lloyd in his third sound feature. The film's copyright was renewed in 1959.

== Plot ==
Harold Hall, a young man with little or no acting ability, desperately wants to be in the movies.

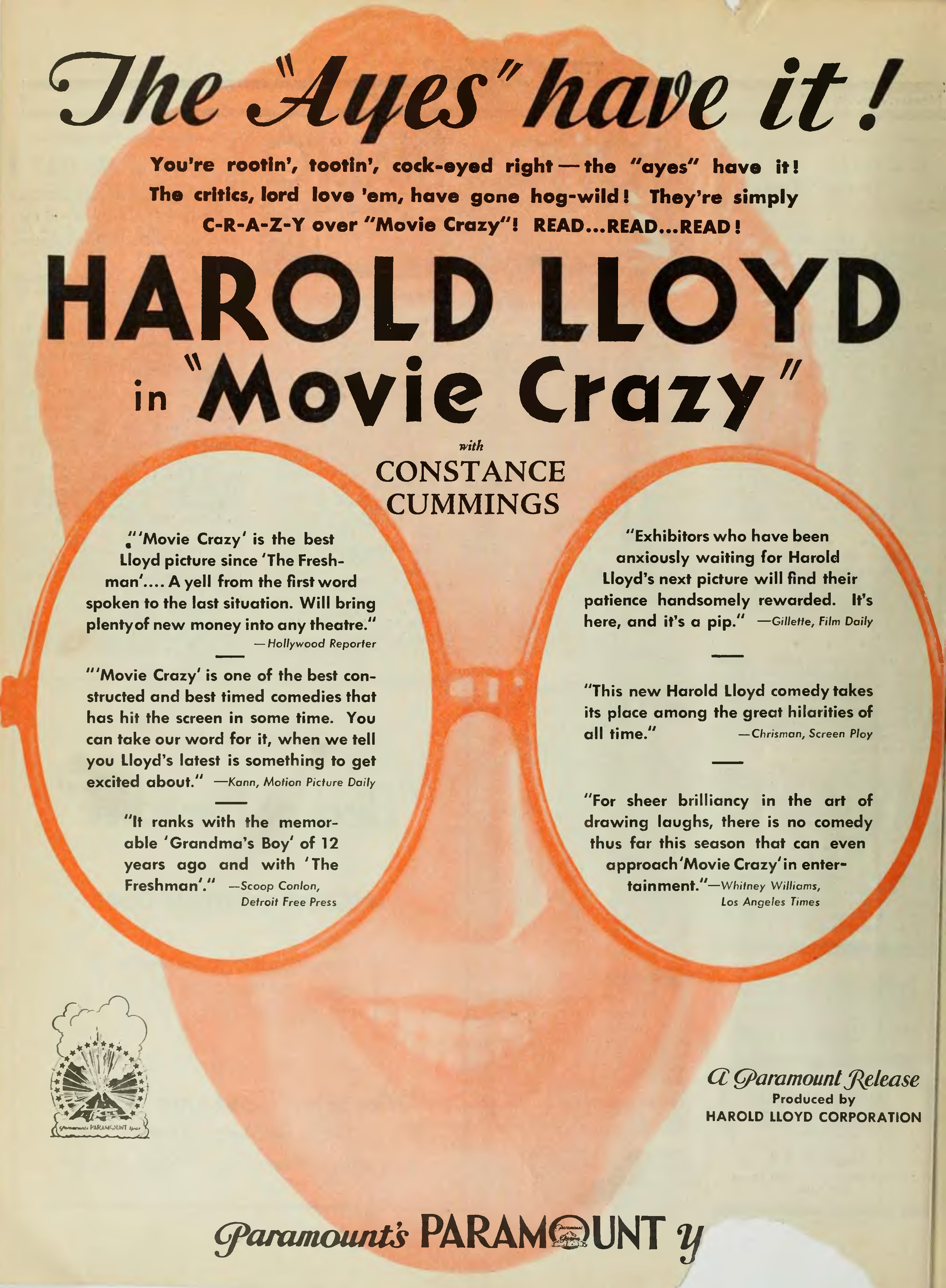
Harold Lloyd in "Movie Crazy" ad from The Film Daily, 1932

After a mix-up with his application photograph, he gets an offer to have a screen test and goes off to Hollywood. At the studio, he does everything wrong and causes all sorts of trouble, but he catches the fancy of a beautiful actress. He meets the actress, Mary Sears, at her home, but does not realize she is the same woman he saw at the studio. She puts Harold through various romance-loyalty tests that he fails, infatuated with the actress persona.

He accidentally wears a magician's suit at a fancy party and inadvertently causes havoc through the magician's tricks going off. Later, he is knocked out and ends up inside a trunk on the set of a film where Mary and her abusive would-be boyfriend are performing a scene. The scene involves multiple rooms and complicated effects, and the director strictly orders the scene to continue filming until he yells "cut". The director loses consciousness, and an unscripted, real-world fight takes place between Harold and the boyfriend, activating the effects that were planned for the film. Harold wins the fight and the director finally ends the scene.

The studio owner sees footage of the fight. He recognizes Harold as a comic genius and offers him a contract, even knowing that the fight was not acting.

== Cast ==
- Harold Lloyd as Harold Hall / Trouble
- Constance Cummings as Mary Sears
- Kenneth Thomson as Vance
- Louise Closser Hale as Mrs Kitterman
- Spencer Charters as J.L. O'Brien
- Robert McWade as Wesley Kitterman, Producer
- Eddie Fetherston as Bill, Assistant Director
- Sydney Jarvis as The Director
- Harold Goodwin as Miller
- Mary Doran as Margie
- DeWitt Jennings as Mr. Hall
- Lucy Beaumont as Mrs. Hall
- Arthur Housman as The "Customer Who Didn't Order Rabbit"
- Grady Sutton as The "Man Afraid of Mice"
- Noah Young as The Traffic Cop
- Edward Peil as The Waiter

== Production ==
This was the first film for Harold Lloyd in two years. Clyde Bruckman, who had directed Lloyd in his first two talkie films along with the sound version of Speedy, was recruited to direct Lloyd, who also served as producer. However, Bruckman soon fell ill to a lingering problem with alcoholism, which led to Lloyd stepping into direct, although he did not take credit for it.

== Background ==
The film was a major box-office success. An estimated $675,000 were spent on the production and the film grossed over $1,439,000 in the United States alone. The film also proved to be a major critical success, as the vast majority of film reviewers praised the picture highly. Cartoonist Ernie Bushmiller provided gags for the film.

== Renewed interest in Harold Lloyd ==
In 1962, scenes from this film were included in a compilation film produced by Harold Lloyd himself entitled Harold Lloyd's World of Comedy. The film premiered at the Cannes Film Festival and created a renewal of interest in the comedian by introducing him to a whole new generation.

== See also ==
- Harold Lloyd filmography
- List of United States comedy films
