= Sweet Mama (film) =

1930 film

- Lantern slide
- Directed by: Edward F. Cline
- Written by: Earl Baldwin; Frederick Hazlitt Brennan
- Starring: Alice White; David Manners; Kenneth Thomson; Rita Flynn
- Cinematography: Sidney Hickox
- Edited by: Edward Schroeder; Fredrick Y. Smith
- Music by: George W. Meyer; Archie Gottler; Robert Mitchell
- Production company: First National Pictures
- Distributed by: First National Pictures
- Release date: July 6, 1930
- Running time: 77 minutes (7 reels)
- Country: United States
- Language: English

Sweet Mama is a 1930 American pre-Code talkie comedy drama film with songs, which was directed by Edward F. Cline and produced and distributed by First National Pictures. The film stars Alice White, David Manners, Kenneth Thomson and Rita Flynn. Planned as a full-scale musical, and released as such for a short time in the summer of 1930, most of the songs were cut from general release prints by the autumn of 1930 due to the public's aversion for musicals.

== Plot ==
Goldie stranded several hundred miles away from New York with a burlesque troupe. She receives a telegraph that her boyfriend, Jimmy, is in jail. Goldie boards a train headed for New York without a ticket because she has no money. When the conductor discovers she has no ticket she is almost thrown off the train. A detective, Mack, befriends Goldie and offers to let Goldie borrow the money she needs for a ticket. When she arrives in New York she finds that Jimmy has been bailed out by a friend and is working for Joe Palmer, a gangster who runs a nightclub. Goldie is disappointed to find that her boyfriend is working for criminals. She gets some money from Jimmy to pay back Mack for the money he gave her for a train ticket. Mack notices that she is paying with bills that have been reported stolen. Goldie confesses everything she knows to the detective about her boyfriend and his new employer. Mack asks Goldie to get a job at the nightclub so that she can get evidence against the gangsters and in return he promises to clear her boyfriend of any wrongdoing. Goldie easily gets a job singing and dancing at the club. Eventually she hears plans about a bank robbery and reports everything to Mack. When the gangster attempt to rob the bank they realize that the police are watching and waiting and conclude that someone has informed the police ahead of time. Thompson suspects that Goldie has informed the police. In order to save her, Jimmy implicates himself and the gangsters get ready to stage an accidental suicide for him. They plan to throw Jimmy out of the window of Joe's penthouse apartment. Goldie informs the police and arrives in the nick of time to save Jimmy. Joe, realizing now that the police have ample evidence against him, attempts to escape and is shot by the police. Jimmy and Goldie are happily reunited and the film ends.

== Cast ==
- Alice White as Goldie
- David Manners as Jimmy
- Kenneth Thomson as Joe Palmer
- Rita Flynn as Lulu
- Lee Moran as Al Hadrick
- Richard Cramer as Elmer
- Robert Elliott as Mack
- Lew Harvey as Gangster
- Lee Shumway as Gangster

== Songs ==
- "Giving It This and That" Sung by Alice White (written by Archie Gottler and George W. Meyer)

== Release ==
Due to the public's backlash against musicals late in 1930, most of the musical numbers were cut from the film to make it more marketable, which accounts for the very short running time of the film, 54 minutes. The film was advertised as a gangster picture, a genre which had become very popular with the public. The complete film, with all the music intact, was released intact in countries outside the United States where a backlash against musicals never occurred.

== Preservation ==
The status of the full 77-minute version of the film is unknown, but a 54-minute version of the film, with most of the musical numbers edited out, does exist.
