= The House of Horror =

1929 film

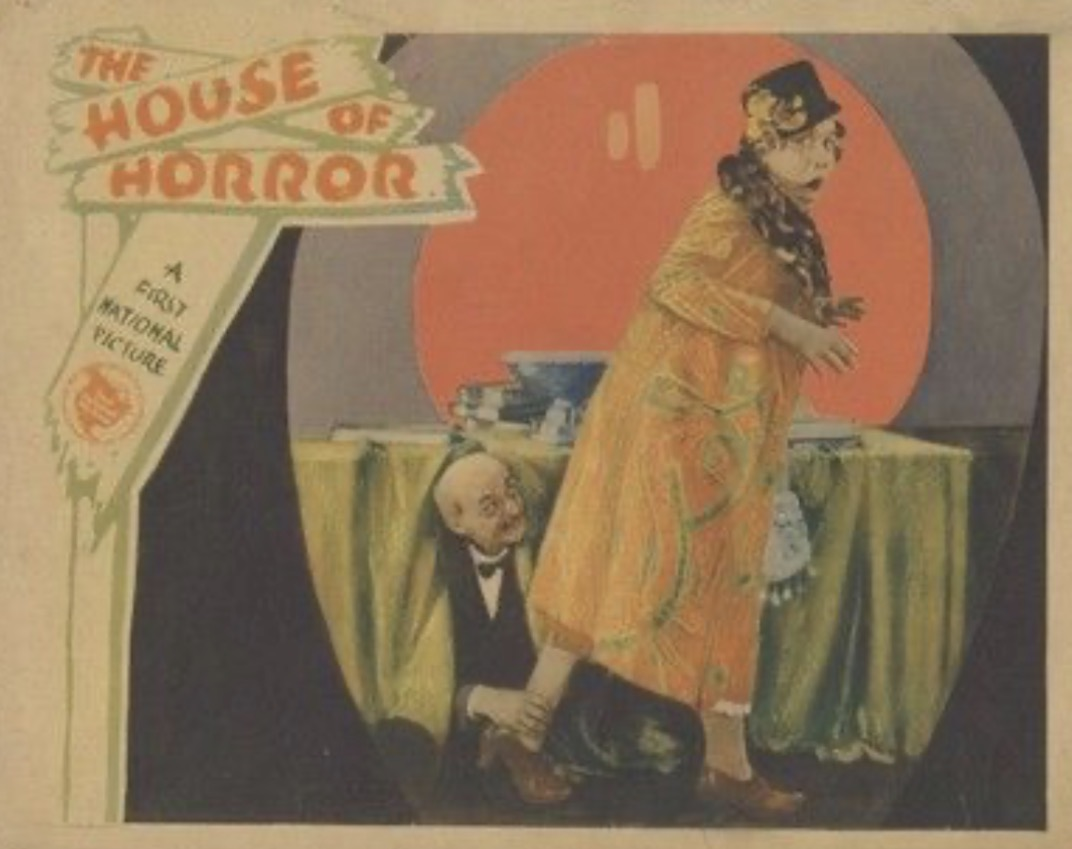
- Lobby Card
- Directed by: Benjamin Christensen
- Written by: Benjamin Christensen
- Starring: Louise Fazenda; Chester Conklin; James Ford; Thelma Todd
- Cinematography: Ernest Haller; Sol Polito
- Edited by: Frank Ware
- Music by: Louis Silvers
- Production company: First National Pictures
- Distributed by: First National Pictures
- Release date: 28 April 1929
- Country: United States
- Languages: Sound (Part-Talkie); English Intertitles

The House of Horror is a 1929 American sound part-talkie comedy mystery film written and directed by Benjamin Christensen. In addition to sequences with audible dialogue or talking sequences, the film features a synchronized musical score and sound effects along with English intertitles. According to the film review in Variety, only 1 percent of the total running time featured dialogue. This very short dialogue sequence was inserted immediately after the starting titles and was apparently added so that the picture could be disingenuously advertised as a talkie. The soundtrack was recorded using the Vitaphone sound-on-disc system. The film stars Louise Fazenda and Chester Conklin.

== Cast ==
- Louise Fazenda as Louise
- Chester Conklin as Chester
- James Ford as Joe
- Thelma Todd as Thelma
- William V. Mong as Mystery Man
- Emile Chautard as Old Miser
- William Orlamond as Miller
- Dale Fuller as Gladys
- Tenen Holtz as Brown
- Michael Visaroff as Chauffeur

== Production ==
The House of Horror was released both as a Part-Talkie and as an International Sound Version. The part-talkie version of the film contained a brief talking sequence at the beginning of the feature but was otherwise just with sound effects and a music score from a Vitaphone disc.

== Release ==
The House of Horror was distributed by First National Pictures on April 28, 1929. The film was Christensen's final Hollywood production as after completing the film he went to Denmark to handle some business ventures. Christensen had plans to make an independent production and return to the United States to follow-up with an American film but he returned to Denmark again 1934.

== Reception ==
From contemporary reviews, Photoplay called the film a "cheap claptrap mystery movie which is saved by the comedy of Chester Conklin and Louise Fazenda" A review in Variety declared it "one of the weakest and most boring afterbirths of pseudo mystery-comedy grinds out of Hollywood. The thing actually rants and rambles, with audience of any mental caliber at sea until the last reel when the title writer makes a supreme effort to account with cart before horse angle." Film Daily declared the film "just a dud that develops nothing in a flat mystery story with a lot of phony situations" declaring its gags as "ancient". Harrison's Reports called the film "a comedy-mystery melodrama, that does not hold the interest too much because the spectator suspects the ending almost from the beginning and is bored by the useless chasing in and out of rooms [...] The familiar hokum of trap doors, mysterious falling objects and door slamming take place."

== Preservation ==
The film elements of The House of Horror are now presumed lost while the sound survives on Vitaphone discs.

== See also ==
- List of early sound feature films (1926–1929)
