= Children of the Ritz =

1929 film

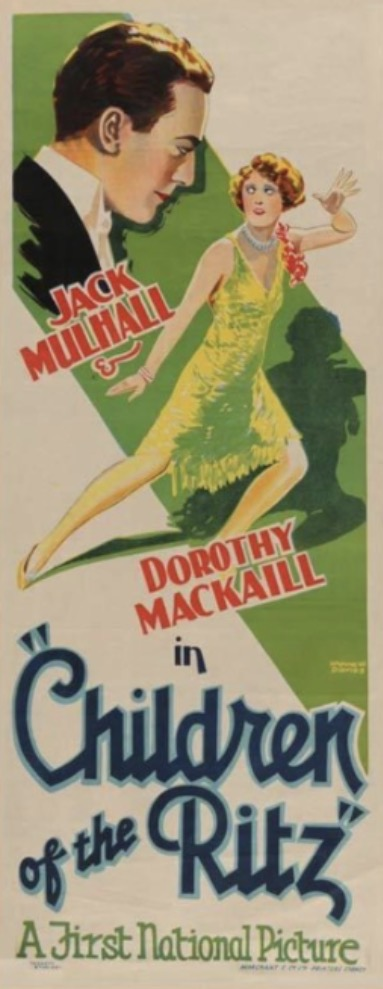
- Theatrical release poster
- Directed by: John Francis Dillon
- Cinematography: James Van Trees
- Edited by: Leroy Stone
- Production company: First National Pictures
- Distributed by: Warner Bros. Pictures, Inc.
- Release date: March 3, 1929
- Running time: 7 reels (approximately 70 minutes)
- Country: United States
- Languages: Sound (Synchronized); English Intertitles

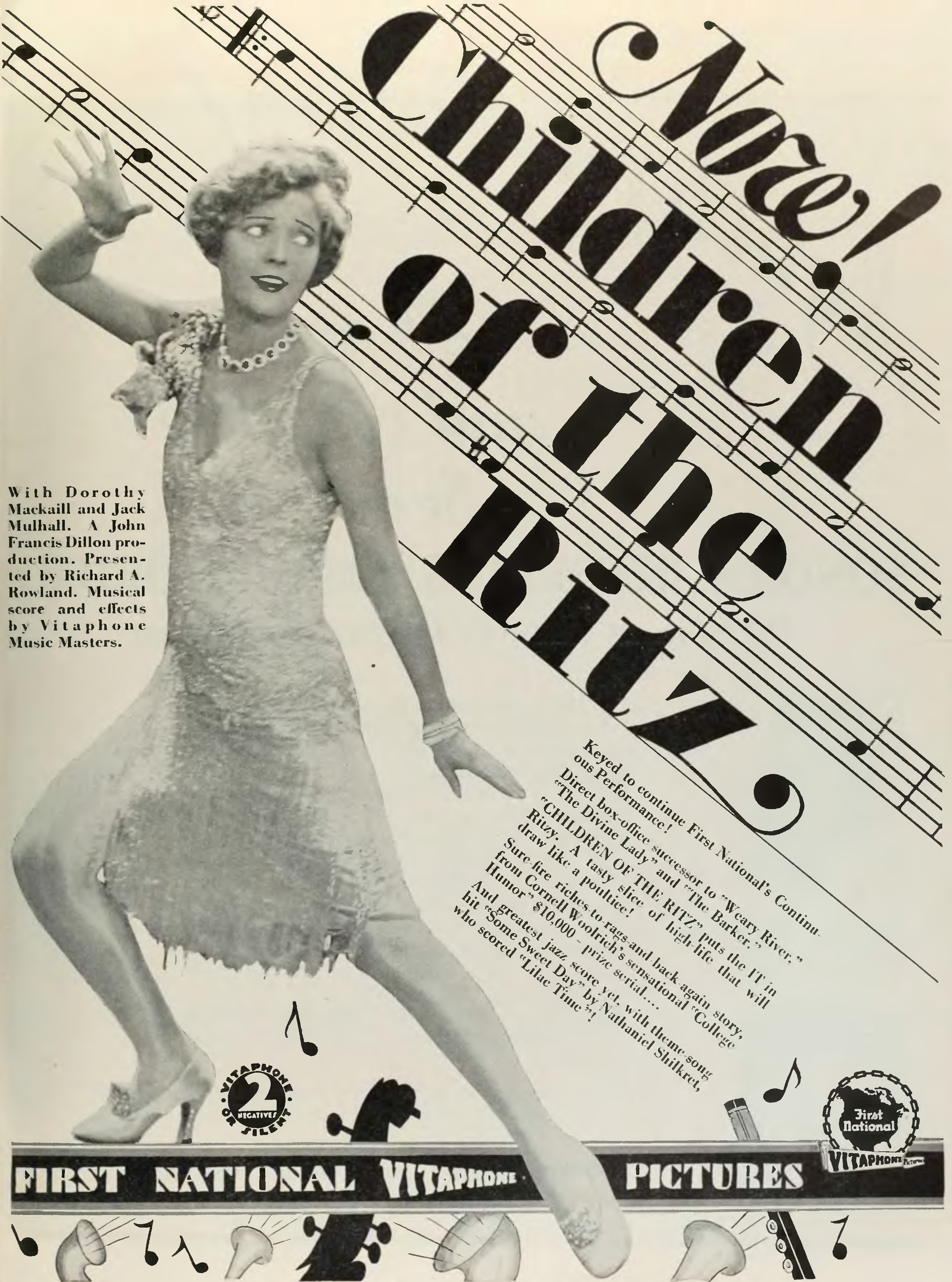
"Children of the Ritz" ad in The Film Daily, 1929

Children of the Ritz is a 1929 American synchronized sound drama film from First National Pictures. While the film has no audible dialog, it was released with a synchronized musical score with sound effects using the Vitaphone sound-on-disc process. The film stars Dorothy Mackaill and Jack Mulhall. The plot is based on the 1927 novel of the same name, by Cornell Woolrich.

== Plot ==
Angela Pennington has been spoiled by a life of privilege. Born into wealth, she treats people—and love—as passing diversions. Her life is a stream of parties and petty amusements. But when her family hires a new chauffeur, Dewey Haines, she finds herself intrigued.

Angela flirts shamelessly with Dewey for sport, but he remains aloof, professional, and self-possessed. He's not easily impressed—after all, he left his last position with a $2,500 bonus, and he takes pride in his independence. He refuses her invitations to join her for ice cream sodas or to let her sit beside him in the front seat. While Angela nearly breaks his resolve, Dewey is too grounded to let himself be drawn in—yet.

At home, Dewey's sister Margie and her boyfriend Gaffney, a breezy young tout, are bubbling with excitement over a "sure thing" at the races. Dewey, drawn by the dream of easy money, takes a gamble with his entire bonus. He puts the full $2,500 on a 20-to-1 longshot—and the horse comes in. He's suddenly rich.

On the same day, Angela's father, Mr. Pennington, facing financial ruin, attempts suicide. Angela, at a wild late-night party with wealthy playboy Jerry Wilder, must be retrieved—and Dewey is the one sent to bring her back. He barges into the party and physically hauls her away. Angela, who has a secret fondness for domineering men, finds herself thrilled.

Now believing her family is broke, Angela falls genuinely in love with Dewey. For the first time, Dewey allows himself to return her affection—and they marry. He gives a large portion of his winnings to his hardworking mother and tries to manage the rest. But he's unprepared for Angela's expensive tastes. She burns through $100 bills on perfume, while charging furs and gowns to his account.

Their marriage grows rocky. Angela, still spoiled, is easily tempted by Jerry's continued attentions. Dewey grows frustrated and humiliated as their money disappears. Eventually, he is forced to sell his car and become a common cab driver. Angela leaves him and returns to her family home.

Jerry seizes the opportunity. He plants doubts in Angela's mind, implying that Dewey is seeing other women on his night shifts. Heartbroken, Angela decides to sail to Paris for a divorce.

But fate intervenes.

One night, while Angela and Jerry are out together, her taxi pulls up beside another cab—and behind the wheel is Dewey. Stunned, Angela rushes after the cab, calling out to him. Dewey drives off—but a red light forces him to stop. She runs up to the window and tries to get in. He rebuffs her. A policeman intervenes and orders Dewey to let the lady in.

Sitting beside him in the cab, Angela promises to change. She tells him she wants to "be good"—to live simply, love deeply, and share his hardships as his wife. Moved, Dewey finally softens.

They drive off into the night together—no longer children of the Ritz, but partners, side by side, in life.

== Cast ==
- Dorothy Mackaill as Angela Pennington
- Jack Mulhall as Dewey Haines
- James Ford as Gil Pennington
- Richard Carlyle as Mr. Pennington
- Evelyn Hall as Mrs. Pennington
- Kathryn McGuire as Lyle Pennington
- Frank Hall Crane as Butler (*Frank Crayne)
- Edmund Burns as Jerry Wilder (*Eddie Burns)
- Doris Dawson as Margie Haines
- Aggie Herring as Mrs. Haines
- Lee Moran as Gaffney

== Music ==
The film featured a theme song entitled "Some Sweet Day" which was composed by Nat Shilkret and Lew Pollack.

== Preservation status ==
Two reels of the film survive at the Eye Filmmuseum archive with an estimated running time of sixteen minutes.

== See also ==
- List of early sound feature films (1926–1929)
