= Rich People (film) =

1929 film

- Directed by: Edward H. Griffith; E. J. Babille (assistant)
- Written by: A. A. Kline
- Based on: "Rich People" by Jay Gelzer
- Produced by: Ralph Block
- Starring: Constance Bennett
- Cinematography: Norbert Brodine
- Edited by: Charles Craft
- Distributed by: Pathé Exchange
- Release date: December 7, 1929
- Running time: 8 reels
- Country: United States
- Language: English

Rich People is a 1929 pre-Code talking picture directed by Edward H. Griffith and starring Constance Bennett. It was produced by Ralph Block and distributed through Pathé Exchange. It is based on a story by Jay Gelzer that was serialized from March to July 1928 in Good Housekeeping magazine.

== Cast ==
- Constance Bennett as Connie Hayden
- Regis Toomey as Jef MacLean
- Robert Ames as Noel Nevins
- Mahlon Hamilton as Beverly Hayden
- Ilka Chase as Margery Mears
- John Loder as Captain Danforth
- Polly Ann Young as Sally Vanderwater

== Music ==
The film features the theme song entitled "One Never Knows" which was composed by Walter O'Keefe and Bobby Dolan.

== Preservation ==
A print is preserved in the Library of Congress film collection.

== See also ==
- List of early sound feature films (1926–1929)
