= The Irish in Us =

1935 film by Lloyd Bacon

- Theatrical release poster
- Directed by: Lloyd Bacon
- Screenplay by: Earl Baldwin
- Story by: Frank Orsatti
- Produced by: Sam Bischoff
- Starring: James Cagney; Pat O'Brien; Olivia de Havilland
- Cinematography: George Barnes
- Edited by: James Gibbon
- Music by: Leo F. Forbstein
- Production company: First National Pictures
- Distributed by: Warner Bros. Pictures
- Release date: August 3, 1935 (USA)
- Running time: 84 minutes
- Country: United States
- Language: English
- Budget: $238,000
- Box office: $1,337,000

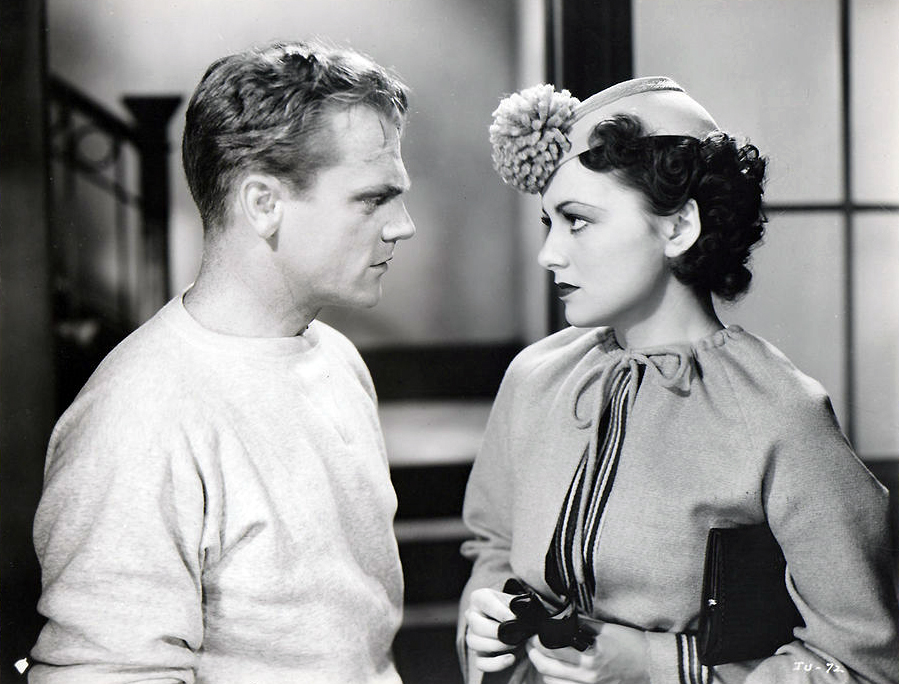
James Cagney and Olivia de Havilland in The Irish in Us (1935)

The Irish in Us is a 1935 American comedy film directed by Lloyd Bacon and starring James Cagney, Pat O'Brien, and Olivia de Havilland. Written by Earl Baldwin based on a story by Frank Orsatti, the film is about an Irish family consisting of a mother and three sons: a cop, a fireman, and a boxing promoter. Encouraged to find a real job, the boxing promoter makes one last attempt by promoting a fighter he believes will bring him a fortune. The Irish in Us was released in the United States by Warner Bros. Pictures on August 3, 1935. The supporting cast features Frank McHugh and J. Farrell MacDonald.

== Plot ==
In Manhattan's lower east side, police officer Pat O'Hara wants his boxing promoter brother Danny to acquire a more dependable job in order to support their mother after Pat marries his girlfriend Lucille Jackson. When Lucille meets charismatic Danny, she promptly falls for him- which complicates matters, to say the least.

When his fighter Hammerschlog gets cold feet just before a packed house charity boxing match, Danny has no choice but to step into the ring himself. Danny wins a bruising multi-round battle, and the publicity from the fight would seem to assure his future success as a promoter.

== Cast ==
- James Cagney as Danny O'Hara
- Pat O'Brien as Pat O'Hara
- Olivia de Havilland as Lucille Jackson
- Frank McHugh as Mike O'Hara
- Allen Jenkins as Carbarn Hammerschlog
- Mary Gordon as Ma O'Hara
- J. Farrell MacDonald as Capt. Jackson
- Thomas E. Jackson as Doc Mullins (as Thomas Jackson)
- Harvey Parry as Joe Delancy (as Harvey Perry)

== Box Office ==
According to Warner Bros records the film earned $894,000 domestically and $443,000 foreign.
