= Driven (1923 film) =

1923 film

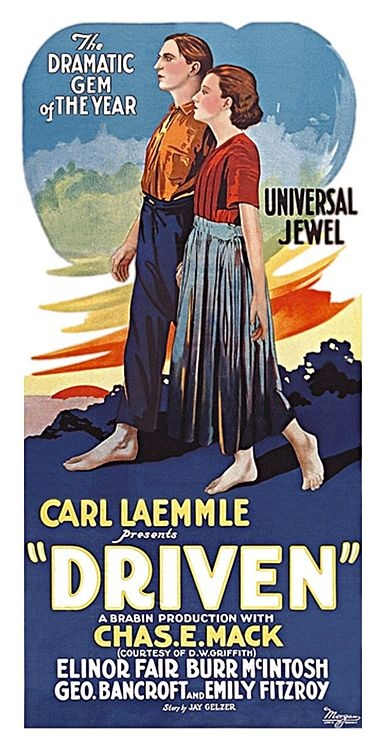
- Film poster
- Directed by: Charles Brabin
- Written by: Al Raboch (scenario)
- Based on: "The Flower of the Flock" by Jay Gelzer
- Produced by: Carl Laemmle
- Starring: Emily Fitzroy; Burr McIntosh; Charles Emmett Mack
- Cinematography: George W. Lane
- Distributed by: Universal Pictures
- Release date: March 5, 1923
- Running time: 6 reels; (5,400 feet)
- Country: United States
- Language: Silent (English intertitles)

Driven is a 1923 American silent romance film produced and distributed by Universal Pictures. The director of the film was Charles Brabin. This film appears to be lost. The film was adapted from "The Flower of the Flock", a short story by Jay Gelzer.

== Cast ==
- Emily Fitzroy - Mrs. Tolliver
- Burr McIntosh - Mr. Tolliver
- Charles Emmett Mack - Tom Tolliver
- George Bancroft - Lem Tolliver
- Fred Koser - Tolliver Son
- Ernest Chandler - Tolliver Son
- Leslie Stowe - John Hardin
- Elinor Fair - Essie Hardin
