= Bodil Rosing =

Danish and American actress (1877–1941)

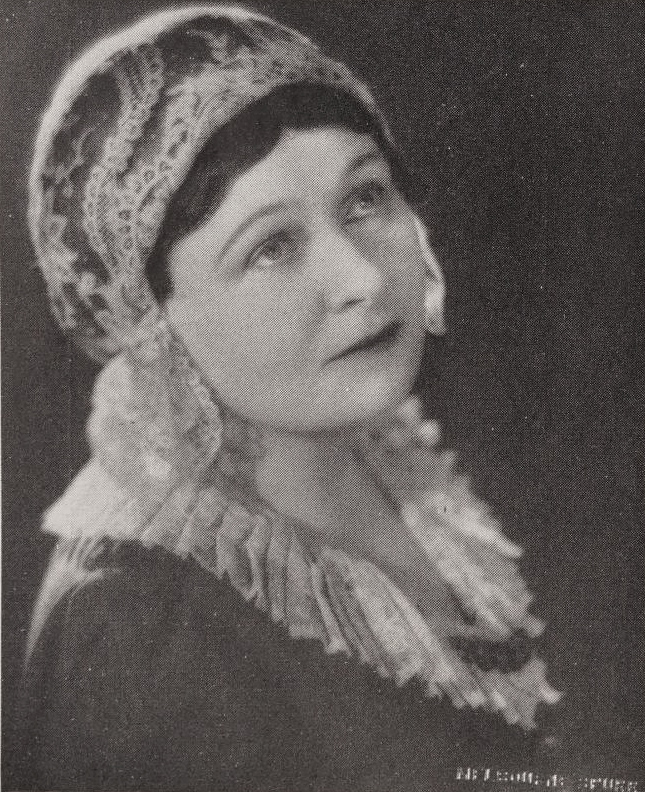
- Rosing c. 1927
- Born: Bodil Frederikke Hammerich; December 27, 1877; Copenhagen, Denmark
- Died: December 31, 1941 (aged 64); Hollywood, California, U.S.
- Occupation: Actress
- Years active: 1925–1941
- Spouse: Eiliv Jansen (m. 1898; div. 1919)
- Children: 4

Bodil Rosing (born Bodil Frederikke Hammerich; December 27, 1877 – December 31, 1941) was a Danish-American stage and film actress in the silent and sound eras.

== Early years ==
Bodil Hammerich was born in Copenhagen, the daughter of music dean Angel Hammerich and pianist Golla Hammerich (née Bodenhoff-Rosing). She studied acting at the Royal Danish Theatre in the 1890s.

== Career ==
Rosing worked as a stage actress in Denmark, performing for three years with the Royal Danish Theatre. She had her stage debut in Henrik Christiernsson's comedy Gurli at the Dagmar Theatre in 1898. In 1904, she played Bianca in The Taming of the Shrew at the Casino Theatre. Her last role at the Dagmar Theatre was as Michelle in Camille in 1905.

During the early 1920s, she made one or two stage appearances on Broadway, including Fools Errant (1922), while raising her children alone. She was retired from acting when she came to Hollywood in 1924, where her daughter married actor Monte Blue. There, she was chosen to play a film role, in Pretty Ladies (1925).

Rosing was under studio contract at MGM and often played matronly roles such as servants, housekeepers, cooks, or mothers. Her most notable role was perhaps Janet Gaynor's faithful maid in F.W. Murnau's silent film Sunrise: A Song of Two Humans (1927). With the advent of sound film, she mostly portrayed foreigners and proved herself an extremely versatile actress in a variety of ethnicities, in about 85 films until her death. She appeared as the wife of her Danish compatriot, Jean Hersholt, in The Painted Veil (1934) with Greta Garbo, replacing the originally cast Beulah Bondi to bring a warmer look to the role. She also played the German neighbor of Lionel Barrymore in You Can't Take It with You (1938) by Frank Capra.

== Personal life and death ==
Rosing married a Norwegian doctor, Einer Jansen, in 1898; the couple had four children. They divorced in 1919.

Rosing died of a heart attack, aged 64. Shortly before her death, Rosing stated about her acting: "My goal has always been to reach the heart of my audience."

== Theatre roles in Denmark ==
Casino Theatre

- 1904 Trold kan tæmmes as Bianca, Baptista's daughter

Dagmar Theatre

- 1898 Gurli Clara as Johanson, model / Julia, Skytt's daughter
- 1898 Trold kan tæmmes as Bianca, Baptistas datter
- 1898 Ungdom as Anna, Pastor Hoppe's maid
- 1899 Cyrano de Bergerac as Marki
- 1899 Fejltagelserne as Constance Neville
- 1899 Henning Tondorf as Agnete Tripke
- 1899 Johannes den Døber as Maccha, Salomes legesøster
- 1899 Min svigerdatter as Marie
- 1899 Naar klostermuren brydes as Søster Ermegard
- 1899 Paa gale vej as Renee, Helene's daughter
- 1899 Zaza as Clairette, varietedame
- 1900 Under fire øjne as Erna, felix's wife
- 1901 Atalanta as Enkefru Thomsen
- 1901 En spurv i tranedans as Luise, Varbergs datter
- 1901 Et piskesmæld as Colette
- 1901 Kameliadamen as Nichette
- 1901 Sovevagonen as Rosina, Charbonneaus datter
- 1902 De fattiges dyrehave as Elisa, Conradsens datter
- 1902 Esther as Birthe, bedstemor Bagges sønnedatter
- 1902 Gurli as Julia, Skytt's daughter
- 1902 Lille Hanne as Engel
- 1902 Tre om een as Lotta, Mrs. Sandberg's maid
- 1902 Zaza as Floriane, varietedame
- 1903 1000 og 1 nat as Ascha, Suleimas veninde
- 1903 Doktor Jojo as Eugenie, Josephins kone
- 1903 Hjærtets begær as Olga Gerle
- 1903 Kærlighed as Ane-Sofie, Kristine's friend

1905 Kameliadamen as Theatre

== Partial filmography ==
- Pretty Ladies (1925) - Minor Role (uncredited)
- The Tower of Lies (1925) - Midwife (uncredited)
- Lights of Old Broadway (1925) - Widow Gorman
- The Volga Boatman (1926) - Tartar Woman (uncredited)
- The Sporting Lover (1926) - Nora O'Brien
- It Must Be Love (1926) - Mom Schmidt
- The Midnight Kiss (1926) - Swedish maid
- The Return of Peter Grimm (1926) - Marta (uncredited)
- The City (1926) - Sarah
- Stage Madness (1927) - Maid
- Sunrise: A Song of Two Humans (1927) - The Maid
- Blondes by Choice (1927) - Caroline Bennett
- Wild Geese (1927) - Mrs. Sandbo
- The Law of the Range (1928) - Mother of Jim and the Kid
- The Big Noise (1928) - Ma Sloval
- The Port of Missing Girls (1928) - Elsa
- Ladies of the Mob (1928) - Yvonne's Mother
- Wheel of Chance (1928) - Sara Turkeltaub
- Out of the Ruins (1928) - Mère Gilbert
- The Fleet's In (1928) - Mrs. Deane
- The Woman from Moscow (1928) - Nadia
- King of the Rodeo (1929) - Mother
- Why Be Good? (1929) - Ma Kelly
- Eternal Love (1929) - Housekeeper
- Betrayal (1929) - Andre's Mother
- Broadway Babies (1929) - Durgan
- The Bishop Murder Case (1929) - Grete Menzel
- Hello Sister (1930) - Martha Peddie
- All Quiet on the Western Front (1930) - Mother of hospital patient (uncredited)
- A Lady's Morals (1930) - Innkeeper's Wife
- Oh, For a Man! (1930) - Masseuse (uncredited)
- Part Time Wife (1930) - Martha - the Cook
- Three Who Loved (1931) - Mrs. 'Aunt Anna' Larson
- Surrender (1931) - Domenica
- The Miracle Man (1932) - Townswoman (uncredited)
- Grand Hotel (1932) - Nurse Helping Old Lady Into Elevator (uncredited)
- Downstairs (1932) - Sophie - the Cook
- Six Hours to Live (1932) - Greta (uncredited)
- The Match King (1932) - Frau Necher (uncredited)
- Hallelujah, I'm a Bum (1933) - Matron (uncredited)
- The Crime of the Century (1933) - Hilda Ericson - Maid
- Reunion in Vienna (1933) - Kathie - the Krug Family Maid
- Ex-Lady (1933) - Mrs. Bauer - Helen's Mother
- Queen Christina (1933) - Innkeeper's Wife (uncredited)
- Hello, Sister (1933)
- Mandalay (1934) - Mrs. Kleinschmidt
- All Men Are Enemies (1934) - Landlady (uncredited)
- Little Man, What Now? (1934) - Frau Kleinholz
- Such Women Are Dangerous (1934) - Helma
- King Kelly of the U.S.A. (1934) - Sylvia, Tania's Chaperone
- Crimson Romance (1934) - Mama von Bergen
- The Painted Veil (1934) - Frau Koerber
- A Night at the Ritz (1935) - Mama Jaynos
- Roberta (1935) - Fernande
- Four Hours to Kill! (1935) - Ma
- Let 'Em Have It (1935) - Mrs. Keefer
- Thunder in the Night (1935) - Lisa
- Peter Ibbetson (1935) - Minor Role (scenes deleted)
- Hearts in Bondage (1936) - Mrs. Adams
- Libeled Lady (1936) - Wife of the Justice of the Peace (uncredited)
- Rose Bowl (1936) - Mrs. Schultz (uncredited)
- The Plot Thickens (1936) - Theresa the Cook (uncredited)
- Thin Ice (1937) - Otto's Wife (uncredited)
- Michael O'Halloran (1937) - Mrs. Polska
- Heidi (1937) - First Village Woman (uncredited)
- Breakfast for Two (1937) - Nanny - Blair's Household Staff (uncredited)
- Conquest (1937) - Anna - Servant (uncredited)
- The First Hundred Years (1938) - Martha
- You Can't Take It with You (1938) - Mrs. Schmidt
- The Great Waltz (1938) - Innkeeper's Wife (uncredited)
- Hotel Imperial (1939) - Ratty Old Woman (uncredited)
- Confessions of a Nazi Spy (1939) - Passenger on Boat
- The Star Maker (1939) - Mrs. Swanson
- Nurse Edith Cavell (1939) - Charlotte
- Hitler – Beast of Berlin (1939) - Frau Kohler
- Florian (1940) - Anna - Diana's Maid (uncredited)
- Four Sons (1940) - Townswoman (uncredited)
- The Mortal Storm (1940) - Old Woman on Train (uncredited)
- Reaching for the Sun (1941) - Rita's Mother
- They Dare Not Love (1941) - Leni (uncredited)
- No Greater Sin (1941)) - 'Ma' James
- Man at Large (1941) - Klara, Botany's Housekeeper
- Marry the Boss's Daughter (1941) - Mrs. Polgar (final film role)
