= Earl Baldwin =

American screenwriter

Earl Baldwin (January 11, 1901– October 9, 1970) was an American screenwriter. He was born in Newark, New Jersey in 1901. During his career he wrote more than 50 produced screenplays, including Wild Boys of the Road, Brother Orchid, and Abbott and Costello's Africa Screams. He died at age 69 in Hollywood, California.

== Partial filmography ==
As screenwriter, unless otherwise indicated.

- On Ze Boulevard (1927)
- Brotherly Love (1928) (scenario)
- The Broadway Melody (1929) (titles)
- The Sophomore (1929)
- Sweet Mama (1930)
- The Widow from Chicago (1930)
- College Lovers (1930) (story)
- The Naughty Flirt (1931) (adaptation)
- The Tip-Off (1931)
- The Big Shot (1931)
- The Mouthpiece (1932) (adaptation and story)
- Doctor X (1932)
- Life Begins (1932) (adaptation)
- The Crash (1932)
- Central Park (1932)
- Blondie Johnson (1933) (also story)
- Wild Boys of the Road (1933)
- Havana Widows (1933)
- Wonder Bar (1934) (also adaptation)
- Here Comes the Navy (1934)
- Devil Dogs of the Air (1935)
- Go into Your Dance (1935)
- The Irish in Us (1935)
- Ever Since Eve (1937) (also uncredited producer)
- A Slight Case of Murder (1938)
- Gold Diggers in Paris (1938)
- Brother Orchid (1940)
- My Love Came Back (1940)
- Honeymoon for Three (1941)
- Unholy Partners (1941)
- The Navy Comes Through (1942) (adaptation)
- Greenwich Village (1944)
- Pin Up Girl (1944)
- Irish Eyes Are Smiling (1944)
- Breakfast in Hollywood (1946)
- Africa Screams (1949)
- Lullaby of Broadway (1951)
- The Go-Getter (1956)
