= Alice White =

American actress (1904–1983)

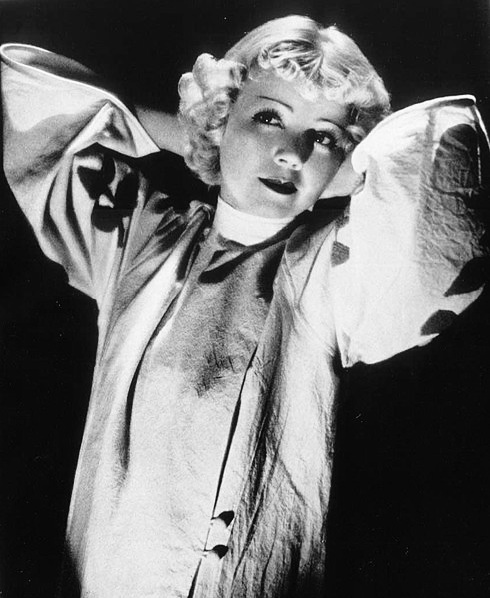
- Publicity photo of White, 1934
- Born: Alva White; August 25, 1904; Paterson, New Jersey, U.S.
- Died: February 19, 1983 (aged 78); Los Angeles, California, U.S.
- Resting place: Valhalla Memorial Park Cemetery
- Occupation: Actress
- Years active: 1927–1950
- Spouses: Sy Bartlett (m. 1933; div. 1937) Jack Roberts (m. 1941; div. 1949)

Alice White (born Alva White; August 25, 1904 – February 19, 1983) was an American film actress. She first came to the public's attention during the late silent era as a rival to Clara Bow, before starring in First National/Warner Brothers films Broadway Babies, Naughty Baby, Hot Stuff, and Sweet Mama.

== Early years ==
Alice White was born in Paterson, New Jersey. Her mother was a chorus girl and Alice was raised by her maternal grandparents. She moved to California with her grandparents when a teenager and attended Hollywood High School for secretarial classes.

== Film ==
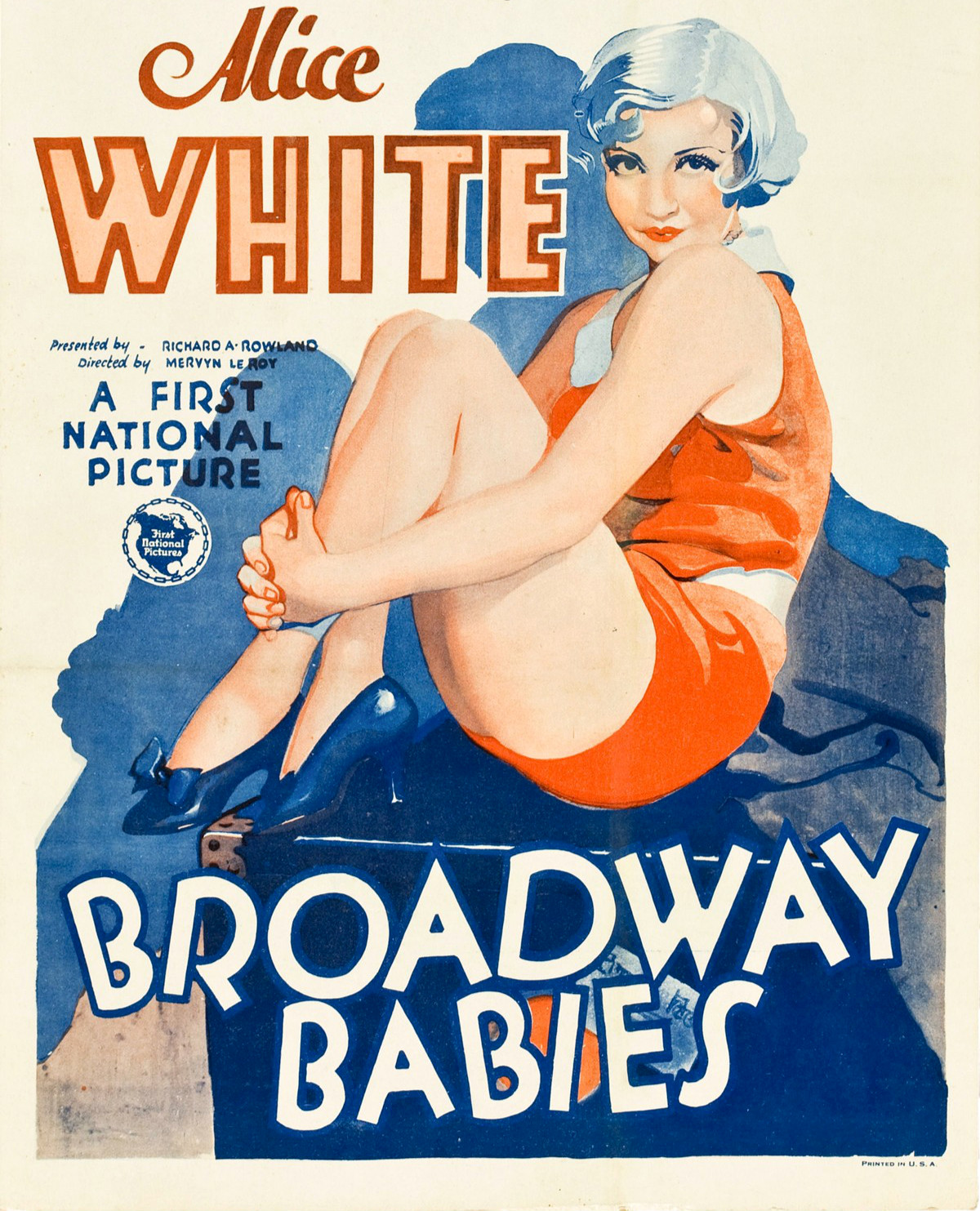
Broadway Babies (1929)

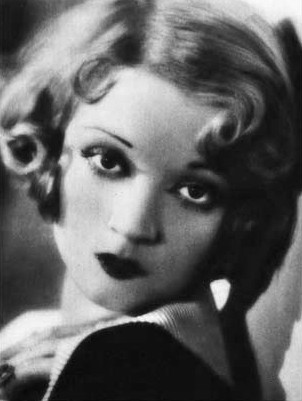
Publicity photo of White from Stars of the Photoplay (1930)

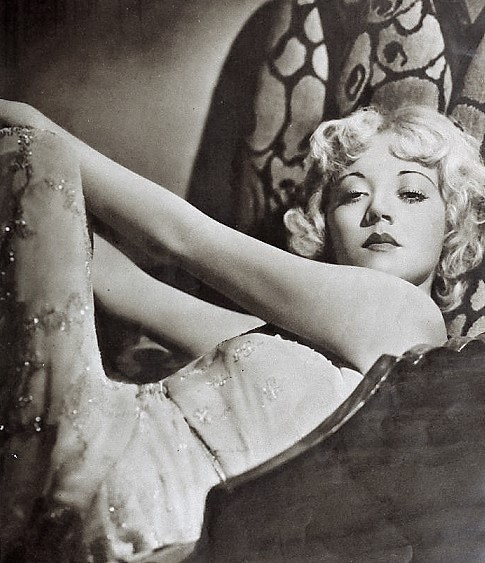
Alice White in 1933

After leaving school, White became a secretary and "script girl" for director Josef von Sternberg. She also worked as a switchboard operator at the Hollywood Writers' Club. After clashing with von Sternberg, White left to work as a script girl for Charlie Chaplin, who said, when he saw some photos a cameraman had taken of her "...you ought to go into the movies."

Her bubbly and vivacious persona led to comparisons with Clara Bow, but White's career was slow to progress. In his book Silent Films, 1877-1996: A Critical Guide to 646 Movies, Robert K. Klepper wrote: "Some critics have said that Ms. White was a second-string Clara Bow. In actuality, Ms. White had her own type of charm, and was a delightful actress in her own, unique way. Whereas Clara Bow played the quintessential, flaming redheaded flapper, Alice White was more of a bubbly, vivacious blonde."

She played a succession of flappers and gold diggers before attracting the attention of director and producer Mervyn LeRoy, who saw potential in her. Her screen debut was in The Sea Tiger (1927). Her early films included Show Girl (1928), which had Vitaphone musical accompaniment but no dialog, and its musical sequel Show Girl in Hollywood (1930), both released by Warner Brothers and both based on novels by J.P. McEvoy. In these two films, White appeared as Dixie Dugan. In October 1929, McEvoy started the comic strip Dixie Dugan with the character Dixie having a "helmet" hairstyle and appearance similar to actress Louise Brooks.

White used the services of Hollywood 'beauty sculptor' Sylvia of Hollywood to stay in shape.

White was featured in The Girl from Woolworth's (1929), having the role of a singing clerk in the music department of a Woolworth's store. Karen Plunkett-Powell wrote in her book Remembering Woolworth's: A Nostalgic History of the World's Most Famous Five-and-Dime: "First National Pictures produced this 60-minute musical as a showcase for up-and-coming actress Alice White."

== Later career ==
White left films in 1931 to improve her acting abilities, returning in 1933 only to have her career hurt by a scandal that erupted over her involvement with boyfriend actor John Warburton and future husband Sy Bartlett. Although she later married Bartlett, her reputation was tarnished and she appeared only in supporting roles after this, including Picture Snatcher (1933) with James Cagney, and a stand-out comic performance in Jimmy the Gent (1934) with Cagney and Bette Davis. By 1937 and 1938, her name was at the bottom of the cast lists. She made her final film appearance in Flamingo Road (1949) and eventually resumed working as a secretary.

== Personal life ==
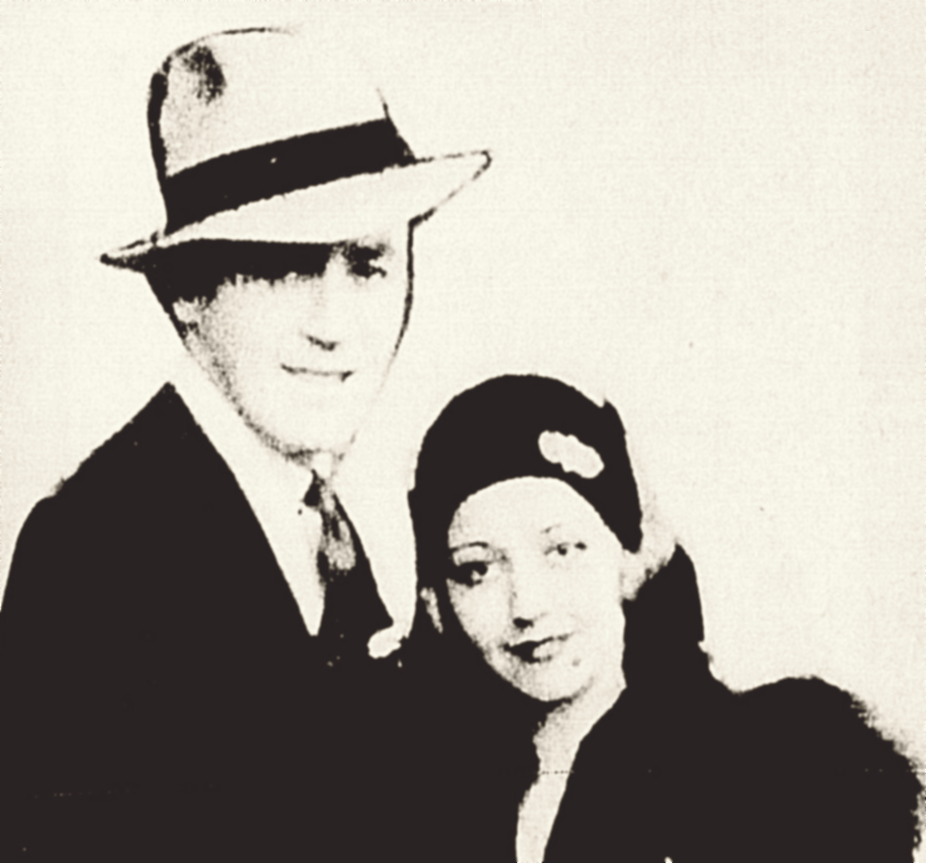
Sy Bartlett and Alice White, 1931

In 1933, White and her fiancé, American screenwriter Sidney "Sy" Bartlett, were accused of arranging the beating of British actor John Warburton. White and Warburton had reportedly had a love affair that ended when he beat her so badly she required cosmetic surgery. A grand jury in Los Angeles decided not to charge Bartlett or White; however, the bad publicity hurt White’s career.

White married Bartlett on December 3, 1933, in Magdalena, Mexico. She filed for divorce in 1937, claiming he "stayed away from home" and was awarded $65 per week in alimony.

White re-married to film writer, John Roberts, on August 24th, 1940. They divorced on April 18, 1949, in Los Angeles. The following year, she sued him over unpaid alimony.

== Death ==
White died of complications from a stroke on February 19, 1983, at age 78. She was buried at Valhalla Memorial Park Cemetery in North Hollywood.

== Award ==
White has a star at 1511 Vine Street in the Motion Pictures section of the Hollywood Walk of Fame. It was dedicated on February 8, 1960.

== Filmography ==
Film
Year	Film	Role	Notes
1927	The Sea Tiger	Manuella	Lost film
1927	The Satin Woman	Jean Taylor Jr.	
1927	American Beauty	Claire O'Riley	Lost film
1927	Breakfast at Sunrise	Loulou	
1927	The Private Life of Helen of Troy	Adraste	Incomplete
1927	The Dove	Bit part	Uncredited; Incomplete
1928	Gentlemen Prefer Blondes	Dorothy Shaw	Lost film
1928	Mad Hour	Aimee	Lost film
1928	Lingerie	Angele Ree ('Lingerie')	
1928	The Big Noise	Sophie Sloval	Lost film
1928	Harold Teen	Giggles Dewberry	
1928	Three-Ring Marriage	Trapeze Performer	Lost film
1928	Show Girl	Dixie Dugan	
1928	Naughty Baby	Rosalind McGill	
1929	Hot Stuff	Barbara Allen	
1929	Broadway Babies	Delight "Dee" Foster	
1929	The Girl from Woolworth's	Pat King	Lost film
1929	The Show of Shows	Herself	
1930	Playing Around	Sheba Miller	
1930	Showgirl in Hollywood	Dixie Dugan	
1930	Sweet Mama	Goldie	
1930	Sweethearts on Parade	Helen	
1930	The Widow from Chicago	Polly	
1931	The Naughty Flirt	Katherine Constance "Kay" Elliott	
1931	Murder at Midnight	Esme Kennedy	
1933	Employees' Entrance	Polly Dale	
1933	Luxury Liner	Milli Lensch	
1933	Picture Snatcher	Allison	
1933	King for a Night	Evelyn	
1934	Cross Country Cruise	May	
1934	Jimmy the Gent	Mabel	
1934	A Very Honorable Guy	Hortense Hathaway	
1934	Gift of Gab	Margot	
1934	Secret of the Chateau	Didi Bonfee	
1935	Sweet Music	Lulu Betts Malone	
1935	Coronado	Violet Wray Hornbostel	
1937	Big City	Peggy Delvin	
1937	Telephone Operator	Dottie Stengal	
1938	King of the Newsboys	Dolly	
1938	Annabel Takes a Tour	Marcella, Hotel Manicurist	
1941	The Night of January 16th		Uncredited
1942	Girls' Town	Nicky	
1949	Flamingo Road	Gracie	
1950	International Burlesque		
Short subjects
Year	Title	Role	Notes
1933	Hollywood on Parade No. A-12		
1934	Hollywood on Parade No. B-6		
1934	The Hollywood Gad-About		
1935	A Trip Thru a Hollywood Studio		
1935	Broadway Highlights No. 2		
