= Orry-Kelly =

Australian-American Hollywood costume designer

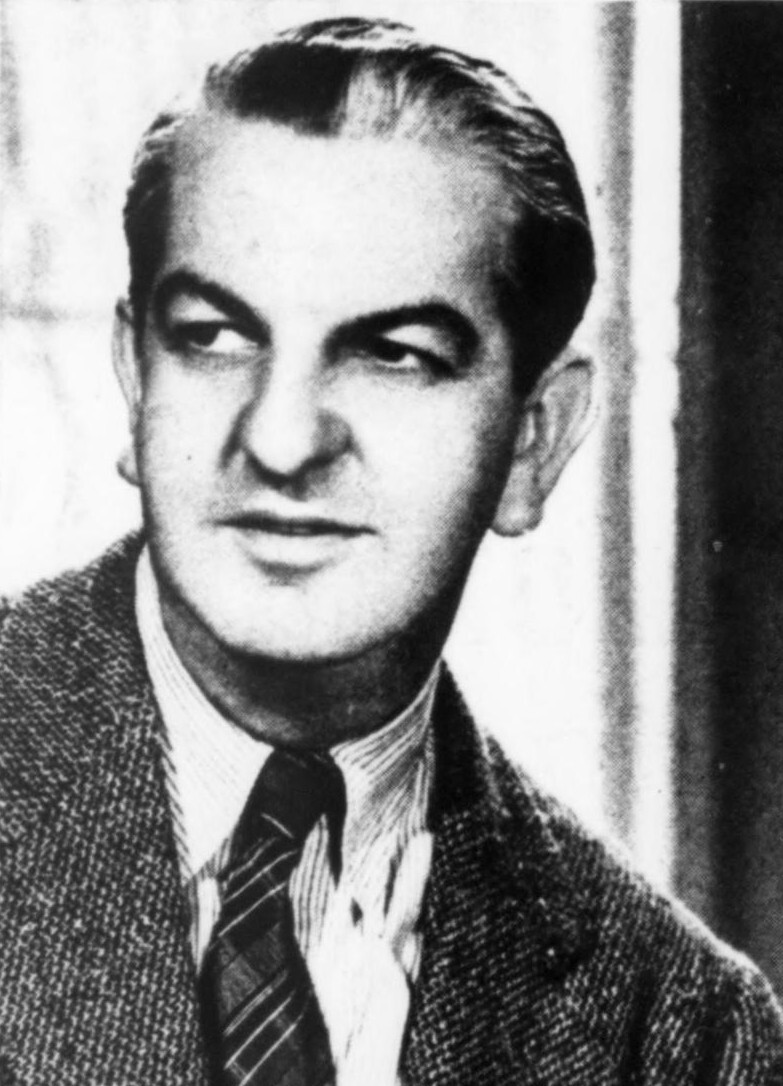
- Orry-Kelly in 1939
- Born: Orry George Kelly; 31 December 1897; Kiama, New South Wales, Australia
- Died: 27 February 1964 (aged 66); Los Angeles, California, United States
- Occupation: Costume designer
- Known for: Costume design
- Awards: Academy Award for Best Costume Design: 1951 An American in Paris; 1957 Les Girls; 1959 Some Like It Hot

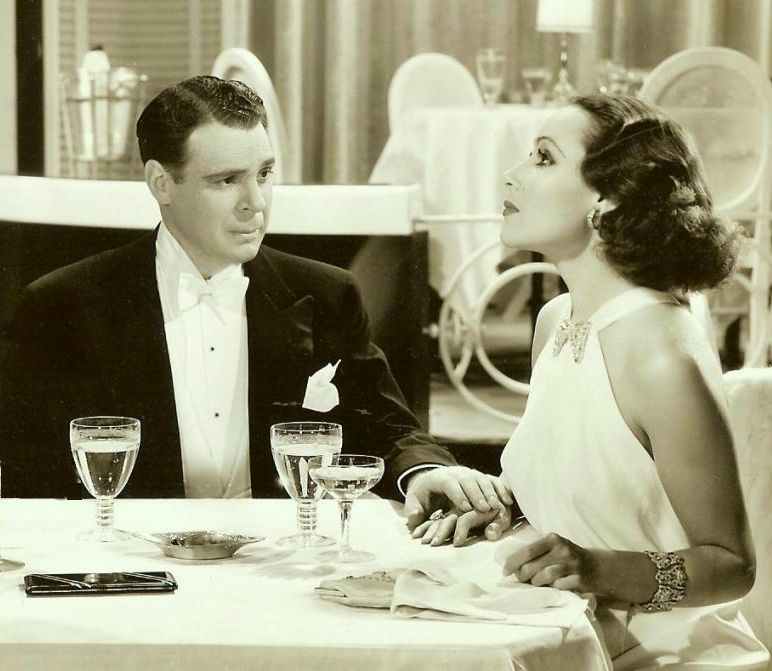
Dolores del Río wears an Orry-Kelly gown in I Live for Love (1935).

Orry George Kelly (31 December 1897 – 27 February 1964), known professionally as Orry-Kelly, was an Australian-born American costume designer. With three Academy Awards from four nominations, he was the most prolific Australian winner until being surpassed by fellow costume designer Catherine Martin in 2014.

== Early life ==
Orry-Kelly was born in Kiama, New South Wales, Australia, and was known as Jack Kelly. His father William Kelly was born on the Isle of Man and was a gentleman tailor in Kiama. Orry was a name of an ancient king of the Isle of Man. Orry-Kelly was sent to Sydney at age 17 to study banking, and there he developed his interest in theatre.

== Career ==
=== Move to the U.S. ===
Orry-Kelly journeyed to New York City to pursue an acting career and shared an apartment in Greenwich Village with Charles Phelps (also known as Charlie Spangles) and Cary Grant, with whom, he wrote, he had an on-again, off-again relationship until the 1930s. A job painting murals in a nightclub led to his employment by Fox East Coast studios illustrating titles. He designed costumes and sets for Broadway's Shubert Revues and George White's Scandals. He served with the United States Army Air Corps during World War II until being discharged for alcohol problems.

=== Hollywood ===
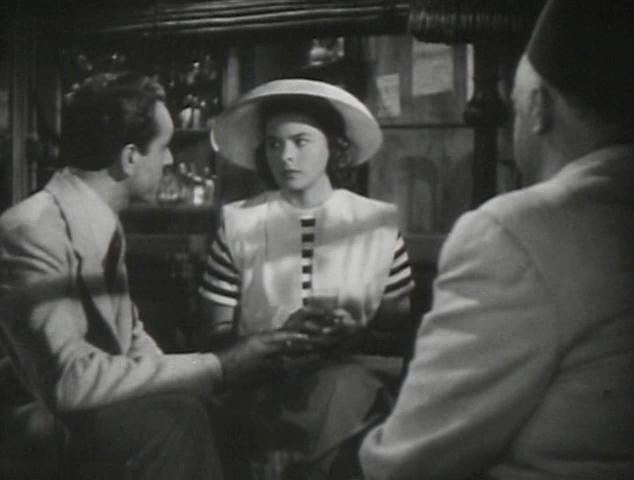
Ingrid Bergman in Casablanca (1942)

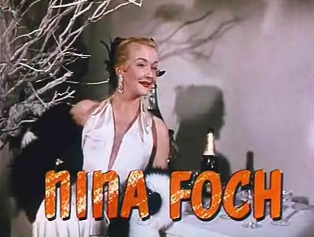
Nina Foch in An American in Paris (1951)

After moving to Hollywood in 1932, Orry-Kelly was hired by Warner Bros. as their chief costume designer and he remained there until 1944. He was encouraged to hyphenate his name for film credits in order to appear more exotic. Later, his designs were also seen in films at Universal, RKO, 20th Century Fox, and MGM studios. He won three Academy Awards for Best Costume Design (for An American in Paris, Les Girls, and Some Like It Hot) and was nominated for a fourth (for Gypsy). In addition to his film work he was also a portrait artist and was permitted to undertake private commissions for gowns and ready-to-wear dresses.

Orry-Kelly worked on many films now considered classics, including 42nd Street, The Maltese Falcon, Casablanca, Arsenic and Old Lace, Harvey, Oklahoma!, Auntie Mame, and Some Like It Hot. He designed for all the great actresses of the day, including Bette Davis, Kay Francis, Ruth Chatterton, Marilyn Monroe, Olivia de Havilland, Katharine Hepburn, Dolores del Río, Ava Gardner, Ann Sheridan, Barbara Stanwyck, and Merle Oberon.

Orry-Kelly was known for his ability to "design for distraction" to compensate for difficult figure shapes. When he was assigned to films with Kay Francis, they would dissect her parts. She would be dressed in opposition to the role, with the traditional femme fatale or manipulative character in frills and the honest heroine in a tailored, classic suit. Orry-Kelly also applied this aesthetic in the creation of gowns for a number of Bette Davis's characters. He also created clothes for the cross-dressing characters played by Tony Curtis and Jack Lemmon in Some Like It Hot. His skill is shown by the fact that while Some Like It Hot was in production, Curtis and Lemmon would go into the ladies' room after eating lunch without being spotted as men. He wrote that when he finished draping Dolores del Río in white jersey, "she became a Greek goddess ... she was incredibly beautiful". The elegant clothes he designed for Bergman's character in Casablanca have been described as "pitch perfect".

In addition to designing, Kelly wrote a column, "Hollywood Fashion Parade", for the International News Service, owned by William Randolph Hearst, during the years of World War II. Kelly's memoirs, entitled Women I've Undressed were discovered in the care of a relative, as a result of publicity surrounding Gillian Armstrong's 2015 documentary on Kelly, Women He's Undressed. The memoir was published for the first time in 2015.

== Death ==
A longtime alcoholic, Orry-Kelly died of liver cancer in Hollywood in 1964 at the age of 66 and was interred in the Forest Lawn Memorial Park, Hollywood Hills. His pallbearers included Cary Grant, Tony Curtis, Billy Wilder and George Cukor and his eulogy was read by Jack L. Warner. He had no living relatives when he died; his personal effects and Academy Awards were stored by Ann Warner, wife of his friend and former boss, Jack. The Oscars were among the items in an exhibition entitled Orry-Kelly: Dressing Hollywood, at the Australian Centre for the Moving Image in August 2015.

== Costume design credits ==
- The Match King (1932)
- Frisco Jenny (1932)
- 20,000 Years in Sing Sing (1932)
- Central Park (1932)
- Silver Dollar (1932)
- I Am a Fugitive from a Chain Gang (1932)
- You Said a Mouthful (1932)
- They Call It Sin (1932)
- Scarlet Dawn (1932)
- Three on a Match (1932)
- The Cabin in the Cotton (1932)
- The Crash (1932)
- One Way Passage (1932)
- Tiger Shark (1932)
- Life Begins (1932)
- Two Against the World (1932)
- Crooner (1932)
- Winner Take All (1932)
- The Rich Are Always with Us (1932)
- So Big! (1932)
- The Working Man (1933)
- Lady Killer (1933)
- Son of a Sailor (1933)
- Convention City (1933)
- The House on 56th Street (1933)
- Havana Widows (1933)
- Female (1933)
- College Coach (1933)
- The Kennel Murder Case (1933)
- Goodbye Again (1933)
- Captured! (1933)
- Voltaire (1933)
- Mary Stevens, M.D. (1933)
- She Had to Say Yes (1933)
- The Narrow Corner (1933)
- Baby Face (1933)
- The Mayor of Hell (1933)
- Heroes for Sale AKA Breadline (1933)
- The Life of Jimmy Dolan (1933)
- Private Detective 62 (1933)
- The Silk Express (1933)
- Gold Diggers of 1933 (1933)
- Ex-Lady (1933)
- Lilly Turner (1933)
- Picture Snatcher (1933)
- Elmer, the Great (1933)
- The Adopted Father (1933)
- Central Airport (1933)
- The Little Giant (1933)
- The Mind Reader (1933)
- The Keyhole (1933)
- Girl Missing (1933)
- Blondie Johnson (1933)
- Grand Slam (1933)
- Mystery of the Wax Museum (1933)
- Ladies They Talk About (1933)
- 42nd Street (1933)
- Hard to Handle (1933)
- Parachute Jumper (1933)
- Employees' Entrance (1933)
- The King's Vacation (1933)
- Lawyer Man (1933)
- Heat Lightning (1934)
- Wonder Bar (1934)
- As the Earth Turns (1934)
- Fashion Follies (1934)
- Fashions of 1934 (1934)
- Mandalay (1934)
- Dark Hazard (1934)
- I've Got Your Number (1934)
- Bedside (1934)
- Hi, Nellie! (1934)
- Massacre (1934)
- Easy to Love (1934)
- The Big Shakedown (1934)
- Sweet Adeline (1934)
- I Sell Anything (1934)
- Murder in the Clouds (1934)
- The Secret Bride (1934)
- Babbitt (1934)
- Flirtation Walk (1934)
- I Am a Thief (1934)
- Gentlemen Are Born (1934)
- Big Hearted Herbert (1934)
- The Firebird (1934)
- The St. Louis Kid (1934)
- Happiness Ahead (1934)
- Kansas City Princess (1934)
- Madame Du Barry (1934)
- A Lost Lady (1934)
- The Case of the Howling Dog (1934)
- British Agent (1934)
- Desirable (1934)
- The Dragon Murder Case (1934)
- Dames (1934)
- Side Streets (1934)
- Housewife (1934)
- The Personality Kid (1934)
- Friends of Mr. Sweeney (1934)
- A Very Honorable Guy (1934)
- Midnight Alibi (1934)
- Return of the Terror (1934)
- Here Comes the Navy (1934)
- Dr. Monica (1934)
- The Circus Clown (1934)
- Fog Over Frisco (1934)
- The Key (1934)
- The Merry Frinks (1934)
- Smarty (1934)
- He Was Her Man (1934)
- Merry Wives of Reno (1934)
- Upperworld (1934)
- Twenty Million Sweethearts (1934)
- Harold Teen (1934)
- Registered Nurse (1934)
- A Modern Hero (1934)
- Gambling Lady (1934)
- Jimmy the Gent (1934)
- Journal of a Crime (1934)
- Stars Over Broadway (1935)
- The Payoff (1935)
- I Found Stella Parish (1935)
- Shipmates Forever (1935)
- Personal Maid's Secret (1935)
- I Live for Love (1935)
- The Goose and the Gander (1935)
- Little Big Shot (1935)
- Page Miss Glory (1935)
- Going Highbrow (1935)
- We're in the Money (1935)
- The Irish in Us (1935)
- Bright Lights (1935)
- Broadway Gondolier (1935)
- Stranded (1935)
- Oil for the Lamps of China (1935)
- The Girl from 10th Avenue (1935)
- In Caliente (1935)
- Go into Your Dance (1935)
- The Case of the Curious Bride (1935)
- The Florentine Dagger (1935)
- Traveling Saleslady (1935)
- Gold Diggers of 1935 (1935)
- Living on Velvet (1935)
- While the Patient Slept (1935)
- The Right to Live (1935)
- The Woman in Red (1935)
- Devil Dogs of the Air (1935)
- Bordertown (1935)
- Maybe It's Love (1935)
- The White Cockatoo (1935)
- Dangerous (1935)
- The Widow from Monte Carlo (1935)
- Broadway Hostess (1935)
- Miss Pacific Fleet (1935)
- Frisco Kid (1935)
- Gold Diggers of 1937 (1936)
- Three Men on a Horse (1936)
- Here Comes Carter (1936)
- Polo Joe (1936)
- Isle of Fury (1936)
- Cain and Mabel (1936)
- Give Me Your Heart (1936)
- Stage Struck (1936)
- China Clipper (1936)
- Jailbreak (1936)
- Satan Met a Lady (1936)
- The White Angel (1936)
- Hearts Divided (1936)
- Murder by an Aristocrat (1936)
- The Golden Arrow (1936)
- The Law in Her Hands (1936)
- Sons o' Guns (1936)
- The Gentleman from Big Bend (1936)
- I Married a Doctor (1936)
- The Singing Kid (1936)
- Snowed Under (1936)
- Colleen (1936)
- The Walking Dead (1936)
- The Petrified Forest (1936)
- Freshman Love (1936)
- Ceiling Zero (1936)
- Hollywood Hotel (1937)
- First Lady (1937)
- It's Love I'm After (1937)
- That Certain Woman (1937)
- Confession (1937)
- The Singing Marine (1937)
- Ever Since Eve (1937)
- Another Dawn (1937)
- Kid Galahad (1937)
- The Go Getter (1937)
- Call It a Day (1937)
- Marked Woman (1937)
- Grand Passion (1937)
- Green Light (1937)
- Stolen Holiday (1937)
- Tovarich (1937)
- Comet Over Broadway (1938)
- Angels with Dirty Faces (1938)
- The Sisters (1938)
- Secrets of an Actress (1938)
- Four Daughters (1938)
- All Rights Reserved (1938)
- My Bill (1938)
- Women Are Like That (1938)
- Jezebel (1938)
- On Your Toes (1939)
- The Private Lives of Elizabeth and Essex (1939)
- The Old Maid (1939)
- When Tomorrow Comes (1939)
- Indianapolis Speedway (1939)
- Juarez (1939)
- Dark Victory (1939)
- Women in the Wind (1939)
- The Oklahoma Kid (1939)
- Wings of the Navy (1939)
- King of the Underworld (1939)
- The Letter (1940)
- A Dispatch from Reuters (1940)
- No Time for Comedy (1940)
- My Love Came Back (1940)
- All This, and Heaven Too (1940)
- The Sea Hawk (1940)
- 'Til We Meet Again (1940)
- Virginia City (1940)
- The Maltese Falcon (1941)
- The Little Foxes (1941)
- The Bride Came C.O.D. (1941)
- Throwing a Party (1941 short)
- Million Dollar Baby (1941)
- Affectionately Yours (1941)
- The Great Lie (1941)
- The Lady and the Lug (1941 short)
- The Strawberry Blonde (1941)
- Honeymoon for Three (1941)
- Casablanca (1942)
- George Washington Slept Here (1942)
- Now, Voyager (1942)
- In This Our Life (1942)
- Murder in the Big House (1942)
- Always in My Heart (1942)
- Kings Row (1942)
- Wild Bill Hickok Rides (1942)
- The Man Who Came to Dinner (1942)
- Old Acquaintance (1943)
- Princess O'Rourke (1943)
- Watch on the Rhine (1943)
- This Is the Army (1943)
- Mission to Moscow (1943)
- Edge of Darkness (1943)
- The Hard Way (1943)
- Arsenic and Old Lace (1944)
- Mr. Skeffington (1944)
- The Adventures of Mark Twain (1944)
- The Dolly Sisters (1945)
- Conflict (1945)
- The Corn Is Green (1945)
- Temptation (1946)
- London Town (1946)
- A Stolen Life (1946)
- Mother Wore Tights (1947)
- Something in the Wind (1947)
- Ivy (1947)
- The Shocking Miss Pilgrim (1947)
- Rogues' Regiment (1948)
- Larceny (1948)
- For the Love of Mary (1948)
- One Touch of Venus (1948)
- Berlin Express (1948)
- A Woman's Vengeance (1948)
- Night Song (1948)
- Undertow (1949)
- Once More, My Darling (1949)
- Johnny Stool Pigeon (1949)
- Take One False Step (1949)
- The Lady Gambles (1949)
- Caught (1949)
- Family Honeymoon (1949)
- Harvey (1950)
- South Sea Sinner (1950)
- Deported (1950)
- One Way Street (1950)
- Woman in Hiding (1950)
- An American in Paris (1951)
- Under the Gun (1951)
- The Star (1952)
- Pat and Mike (1952)
- The Lady Says No (1952)
- Oklahoma! (1955)
- Auntie Mame (1958)
- Wonderful Town (1958 television film)
- Too Much, Too Soon (1958)
- Les Girls (1957)
- Some Like It Hot (1959)
- The Hanging Tree (1959)
- A Majority of One (1961)
- Two for the Seesaw (1962)
- Gypsy (1962)
- The Chapman Report (1962)
- Five Finger Exercise (1962)
- Sweet Bird of Youth (1962)
- Sunday in New York (1963)
- Irma la Douce (1963)
- In the Cool of the Day (1963)
