= 'Til We Meet Again =

1940 romance film

- Lobby card depicting Merle Oberon (left) and Geraldine Fitzgerald
- Directed by: Edmund Goulding; Anatole Litvak; Uncredited: William Keighley; William K. Howard
- Written by: Robert Lord
- Screenplay by: Warren Duff
- Produced by: Hal B. Wallis (exec. prod.)
- Starring: Merle Oberon; George Brent; Pat O'Brien
- Cinematography: Tony Gaudio
- Edited by: Ralph Dawson
- Music by: Heinz Roemheld
- Production company: Warner Bros. Pictures
- Distributed by: Warner Bros. Pictures
- Release date: April 20, 1940
- Running time: 99 minutes
- Country: United States
- Language: English

'Til We Meet Again is a 1940 American romance film directed by Edmund Goulding and Anatole Litvak and starring Merle Oberon and George Brent as two doomed, star-crossed lovers. It is a remake—with new characters and some different scenes—of the 1932 film One Way Passage. 'Til We Meet Again was remade into the 1954 Mexican 3-D film El valor de vivir.

== Plot ==
Total strangers Dan Hardesty and Joan Ames meet by chance in a crowded bar in Hong Kong when she admires the "Paradise cocktail" that Dan has just concocted. He asks for another glass and pours half of his drink into it. After they drink, he breaks off the bowl of his glass and places the stem on the bar; she follows suit, and he helps her to place the stem of her glass across his. Dan leaves the bar and is promptly handcuffed by Lieutenant Steve Burke of the San Francisco police. Burke has spent a year chasing Dan, a convicted murderer who jumped off a train on his way to San Quentin to be hanged.

He takes Dan to an ocean liner for the journey to San Francisco. As they are boarding, Dan jumps into the water (with Steve still handcuffed to him). He takes the key to the handcuffs from Steve's pocket and frees himself. He starts to swim away, but turns back to rescue non-swimmer Steve before making his getaway. Dan is recaptured and put aboard the ship.

"Rocky" Rockingham T. Rockingham (Frank McHugh, reprising his role in One Way Passage) scrambles aboard at the last minute. Joan is also a passenger. When she collapses, the ship's doctor learns of her fatal heart condition, but she plans to keep going "around the little world."

Once they are underway, Steve allows Dan the freedom of the ship. In the bar, Dan encounters Rocky, an old friend, and asks for his help. Joan enters the bar, shares another Paradise with Dan, and their courtship begins.

Also aboard is another of Dan's old friends, the "Comtesse de Bresac". The Comtesse is actually Liz, a con artist trained by Dan when she was young. She is still a little in love with him. When she learns of Dan's predicament, she keeps a smitten Steve occupied and secretly empties his gun of bullets. A romance develops between the mismatched pair.

As they near Honolulu, Steve overhears Joan and Dan plan to spend the next day ashore. He takes Dan to the brig. Dan picks up a bottle to knock him out, but Steve shoots it (he had checked his gun and reloaded it). Liz slips Steve some sleeping pills and frees Dan. When he is spotted by Joan, he postpones his "business" to go on their outing. Later, on the way back, Dan stops the rented car before they reach the pier. However, when Joan collapses, Dan carries her back aboard. The ship's doctor tells Dan about Joan's prognosis. Liz tells a stunned Dan that he still has time to get away. From the doorway, Steve says, "No, he doesn't."

On the last night, everyone on shipboard is partying. Liz asks Burke why he has been avoiding her since Honolulu. He reveals that he got a cable about her. She tries to bribe him, to no avail. However, he is still attracted to her, saying there is less room between a cop and a countess than a cop and a con. In the bar, Dan and Joan bid each other goodbye, sharing one last Paradise cocktail and promising to meet in Mexico City at the Palace Bar on New Year's Eve.

The next morning in San Francisco, the assistant purser tips a newspaper reporter that Dan spent a lot of time with Joan. The reporter tricks his way into Joan's stateroom and reveals Dan's fate to her. Frantic, she rushes out and finds Dan on deck. They bid each other goodbye, each concealing what they know about the other.

In the Palace Bar in Mexico City, the crowd is celebrating New Year's. Two bartenders hear the sound of glass breaking and turn to find a pair of glasses with the stems crossed on the bar.

== Cast ==
- Merle Oberon as Joan Ames
- George Brent as Dan Hardesty
- Pat O'Brien as Police Lieutenant Steve Burke
- Geraldine Fitzgerald as Bonny Coburn, a newlywed fellow passenger and friend of Joan's
- Binnie Barnes as la Comtesse de Bresac
- Frank McHugh as Rockingham T. Rockingham
- Eric Blore as Sir Harold Pinchard, a shipboard victim of the Comtesse and Rockingham
- Henry O'Neill as Dr. Cameron, the ship's doctor
- George Reeves as Jimmy Coburn, Bonny's husband
- Frank Wilcox as Frank, Assistant Purser
- Doris Lloyd as Louise, Joan's maid

== Production ==
The film was based on the story by Robert Lord that was the basis for One Way Passage. Lord won an Academy Award in 1933 in the category Best Writing, Original Story for the earlier film.

The same basic musical theme is used in both films. Leo F. Forbstein, music director on this film, was Vitaphone Orchestra Conductor for One Way Passage. Ray Heindorf did the orchestral arrangements.

According to David Lewis, the original producer was Mark Hellinger but he was struggling with the material so Jack Warner assigned the job of producing to Lewis. Edmund Goulding was directing and writing the script. Lewis says Goulding's script was running long so Warren Duff was brought on.

The original star was to be Norma Shearer but she wanted George Raft to co star, and Lewis was opposed to this. Shearer quit, suggesting Merle Oberon play the lead.

Goulding fell ill during shooting. Warners wanted to replace him with William Keighley but Merle Oberon did not like him as a director. Instead Anatole Litvak stepped in to finish it.

== Reception ==
Variety staff praised the film, observing that although it was a remake, it "still has plenty of sock left" and that the two leads did "an excellent job. Oberon's sincere and eye-filling performance equals that of her predecessor in the role, while Brent comes within at least a shade of Powell's superb portrayal."

The New York Times critic Benjamin Crisler disagreed, writing, "It may be that quite a number of people, touched by the synthetic tragedy of it, will mistake ''Til We Meet Again' for art, but the fact remains that it is just a very sad remake of 'One Way Passage'".

Lewis wrote "the warmth and glow of Merle's personality helped lift what was at best a compromise film above its level, and the picture was surprisingly well received."

== Notes ==
- Lewis, David (1993). Curtis, James (ed.). The Creative Producer. Metuchen: Scarecrow Press. ISBN 0-8108-2720-4.
