= The Purchase Price =

1932 film

- Theatrical release poster
- Directed by: William Wellman
- Screenplay by: Robert Lord
- Based on: The Mud Lark; 1932 novel by Arthur Stringer
- Starring: Barbara Stanwyck; George Brent; Lyle Talbot
- Cinematography: Sidney Hickox
- Edited by: William Holmes
- Music by: Leo F. Forbstein
- Production company: Warner Bros. Pictures
- Distributed by: Warner Bros. Pictures
- Release date: July 23, 1932 (USA)
- Running time: 68 minutes
- Country: United States
- Language: English

The Purchase Price is a 1932 pre-Code American romantic drama film directed by William Wellman and starring Barbara Stanwyck, George Brent and Lyle Talbot. Adapted from the novel The Mud Lark by Arthur Stringer, with a screenplay by Robert Lord, the film is about an attractive nightclub singer who leaves her criminal boyfriend and becomes the mail-order bride of a humble farmer.

== Plot ==
Joan Gordon, a New York torch singer who has been performing since age 15, has left her wealthy criminal boyfriend Eddie Fields for upstanding citizen Don Leslie. However, when Don's father learns about her relationship with Eddie; she and Don cancel their engagement, and she leaves town rather than returning to Eddie. In Montreal, she changes her name and resumes performing, but one of Eddie's men soon recognizes her and informs his boss. Unwilling to return to him, she trades places with her hotel's maid Emily, who had used Joan's picture when corresponding with a North Dakota farmer in search of a mail-order bride. Offering the maid $100 for the farmer's address, Joan sets out to become the wife of Jim Gilson, with only a vague idea of all the hardships of farm life during the height of the Great Depression.

Married on October 26, 1931, in Elk's Crossing, North Dakota, Jim and Joan's relationship gets off to a rocky start. On their first night, she rejects his advances and forces him to sleep elsewhere. In the morning, she apologizes but he keeps his distance. Over time, she falls in love with him, but he remains aloof. Meanwhile, Jim is informed that he will lose his land if he cannot pay his overdue mortgage. He has developed a great strain of wheat and is sure that it will bring a profit, but he has no way to forestall foreclosure long enough to plant and harvest a crop. Neighboring farmer Bull McDowell offers to buy Jim's land in exchange for Joan's company, but Jim is unwilling to make such a bargain and thereby makes an enemy of Bull.

Later, Joan, who has become a very capable farmer's wife, visits a neighbor who just gave birth with only her adolescent daughter by her side. Joan cleans the home, prepares food, turns an old dress into diapers and calms the frightened daughter, Sarah Tipton. She braves a snowstorm to return home only to find Eddie there, who had told Jim that he was lost in the storm. She pretends not to know Eddie, but he tries to convince her to return with him. Jim, angry with Joan because of her complicated past, tells her to go with Eddie. She refuses and later privately asks Eddie for a loan to save Jim's land.

The loan, which Jim thinks is an extension from the bank, enables them to stay on the farm until after the harvest. She continues to stand by him, but he remains distant. One night, Bull torches some of the crop, but Joan and Jim are able to save it. Joan is injured, but she is finally able to crack Jim's tough exterior.

== Cast ==
- Barbara Stanwyck as Joan Gordon
- George Brent as Jim Gilson
- Lyle Talbot as Eddie Fields
- Hardie Albright as Don Leslie
- David Landau as Bull McDowell
- Murray Kinnell as Spike Forgan
- Anne Shirley as Sarah Tipton (uncredited)

== Production ==
During the fight scene between Talbot and Brent, Wellman approached each actor privately with the instruction: "let him have it." The actors practiced the fight, but when Talbot was thrown against a wall (as planned), his head struck a nail. He said: "It just bled like mad. They had to take me over to the infirmary and sew me up."

Stanwyck was hospitalized with burns on her legs after filming the fire scene.

Stanwyck's rendition of "Take Me Away" marked the first time that she sang onscreen.

== Reception ==
In a contemporary review for The New York Times, critic Andre Sennwald wrote: "If 'The Purchase Price' were simply unintelligent, it would be easy to dismiss it in a phrase, or two phrases. That it happens to give sanctuary to one of the weirdest scenarios within the memory of man and that it happens to be totally incomprehensible ... are factors that make life difficult. There is a farmer somewhere in the piece who proclaims his belief that the heroine is 'one of the daffiest dames' in the whole Northwest. And maybe that is the safest way to look at it."

The entertainment trade publication Variety wrote that Stanwyck and Brent were "both 100% miscast", while the Kansas City Star stated that "the picture has more entertainment value than the plot has logic." The reviewer added: "Miss Stanwyck continues to exercise her uncanny ability to make the most phony heroines seem like human beings."

Time magazine wrote: "The picture hews close to the line of probability ... [R]are until recently has been the cinema heroine who preferred the stupid poor man to the bright city fellow. The viewpoint of The Purchase Price is simple and masculine. It advertises the virtue of hard work and loyalty."

== Home media ==
The Purchase Price was released on VHS under MGM's Forbidden Hollywood 1990s label. In addition to four other Wellman pre-Code films, it was released on DVD as part of Turner Classic Movies's 2009 Forbidden Hollywood, Vol. 3 collection in 2009.
