= Heat Lightning (film) =

1934 film by Mervyn LeRoy

- Directed by: Mervyn LeRoy
- Written by: Brown Holmes; Warren Duff
- Based on: Heat Lightning; 1933 play by George Abbott; Leon Abrams
- Produced by: Samuel Bischoff (uncredited)
- Starring: Aline MacMahon; Ann Dvorak; Preston Foster
- Cinematography: Sidney Hickox
- Edited by: Howard Bretherton
- Music by: Leo F. Forbstein
- Production company: Warner Bros. Pictures
- Distributed by: Warner Bros. Pictures
- Release date: March 3, 1934
- Running time: 63 minutes
- Country: United States
- Language: English

Heat Lightning is a 1934 pre-Code drama film starring Aline MacMahon, Ann Dvorak, and Preston Foster. It is based on the play of the same name by Leon Abrams and George Abbott.

The movie was one of the last to be released before the Motion Picture Production Code was rigorously enforced. According to Robert Osborne of Turner Classic Movies, two months after its release, it was condemned by the Catholic Legion of Decency. The Hays Office objected to the seductions that occur in the film because they were in violation of the Production Code, particularly the scene in which "George" leaves "Olga's" room in the morning and buttons his coat. The Office also objected to the underlined portion of the hitchhiker's line to her friend, in reference to their driver: "Say, it's your turn to sit up in front with that old thigh-pincher." A print is held at the Library of Congress.

== Plot ==
Olga runs an isolated gas station and restaurant in the stifling hot desert somewhere in the American Southwest with her discontented younger sister Myra. The sisters clash when Olga forbids Myra from going to a dance with her boyfriend Steve.

The same day, chance sends Olga an unexpected and unwelcome customer, ex-boyfriend George. Unknown to her, George and his nervous partner Jeff are on the run from the police after a botched robbery that left two men dead, killed by George. Initially intent on sneaking across the border to Mexico, George decides to stay awhile when two jewelry-laden, wealthy divorcees, "Feathers" Tifton and "Tinkle" Ashton-Ashley, are stranded there for the night by their long-suffering chauffeur Frank.

Frank pretends there is something wrong with their car so he can have a rest from driving. Olga, the mechanic, plays along. Mrs. Ashton-Ashley becomes worried about a large Mexican family spending the night nearby, and Olga offers to store the women's valuables in her safe.

George manipulates Olga's feelings, reviving the love she once felt for him. Although she tries to resist, she eventually succumbs to his charms, and they sleep together. This incident gives Myra the opportunity to sneak away to meet Steve. Myra returns later that night, terribly upset after having been taken advantage of by Steve. When Olga starts berating her for going off with her boyfriend, she responds by revealing she saw George leaving Olga's bedroom. The two miserable women then comfort each other.

Meanwhile, George orders Jeff to open the safe. Jeff is reluctant to cause trouble for Olga, but gives in when George pulls out his gun. Olga overhears George say he slept with her just to set up the theft. She gets her pistol and shoots him. As he lies dying, he apologizes to her. Olga lets Jeff go.

== Cast ==
- Aline MacMahon as Olga
- Ann Dvorak as Myra
- Preston Foster as George
- Lyle Talbot as Jeff
- Glenda Farrell as Mrs. "Feathers" Tifton
- Frank McHugh as Frank, the Chauffeur
- Ruth Donnelly as Mrs. "Tinkle" Ashton-Ashley
- Theodore Newton as Steve Laird
- Willard Robertson as Everett Marshall
- Harry C. Bradley as "Popsy"
- James Durkin as The Sheriff
- Jane Darwell as Gladys, The Wife
- Edgar Kennedy as Herbert, The Husband
- Muriel Evans as Blonde Cutie

== 1941 remake ==
Using Abbott and Abrams' play for Heat Lightning, Allen Rivkin, Charles Kenyon, and Kenneth Gamet wrote the screenplay for Warner Bros. remake Highway West (1941).
