= Lover Come Back (1946 film) =

1946 film by William A. Seiter

- Theatrical release poster
- Directed by: William A. Seiter (as William Seiter)
- Written by: Michael Fessier; Ernest Pagano
- Produced by: Howard Benedict
- Starring: George Brent; Lucille Ball; Vera Zorina
- Cinematography: Joseph Valentine
- Edited by: Ray Snyder
- Music by: Hans J. Salter
- Production company: Fessier Pagano Productions
- Distributed by: Universal Pictures
- Release date: June 21, 1946 (United States)
- Running time: 90 minutes
- Country: United States
- Language: English

Lover Come Back is a 1946 American romantic comedy film directed by William A. Seiter and starring George Brent, Lucille Ball and Vera Zorina. Supporting actors include Raymond Walburn and Charles Winninger.

To avoid confusion with Lover Come Back (1961), this film was retitled When Lovers Meet for television.

== Plot ==
Kay Williams is anxious to provide feminine companionship to her war correspondent husband upon his return from service, but is jealous when she notices her husband with a beautiful combat photographer. The couple divorces but eventually makes amends; hence, "lovers come back".

== Cast ==
- George Brent as William 'Bill' Williams Jr.
- Lucille Ball as Kay Williams
- Vera Zorina as Madeline Laslo
- Charles Winninger as William 'Pa' Williams Sr.
- Carl Esmond as Paul Millard
- Raymond Walburn as J.P. 'Joe' Winthrop
- Wallace Ford as Tubbs
- Elisabeth Risdon as 'Ma' Williams
- William Wright as Jimmy Hennessey
- Louise Beavers as Martha, Kay's Maid
- Franklin Pangborn as Hotel Clerk
- George Chandler as Walter
- Joan Shawlee as Janie (as Joan Fulton)
