= The Homicide Squad =

1931 film

- Film poster
- Directed by: George Melford; Edward L. Cahn
- Written by: John Thomas Neville; Charles Logue; Tom Reed
- Based on: The Mob by Henry La Cossitt
- Produced by: Carl Laemmle Jr.
- Starring: Leo Carrillo; Noah Beery; Mary Brian; Russell Gleason; George Brent; Walter Percival
- Cinematography: George Robinson
- Edited by: Harry W. Lieb
- Production company: Universal Pictures
- Distributed by: Universal Pictures
- Release date: September 29, 1931
- Running time: 70 minutes
- Country: United States
- Language: English

The Homicide Squad is a 1931 American pre-Code crime film directed by George Melford and Edward L. Cahn and written by John Thomas Neville, Charles Logue and Tom Reed. It is based on a 1928 Henry La Cossitt short story that originally ran in Adventure magazine. The film stars Leo Carrillo, Noah Beery, Sr., Mary Brian, Russell Gleason, George Brent and Walter Percival. The film was released on September 29, 1931, by Universal Pictures.

== Cast ==
- Leo Carrillo as Big Louie Grenado
- Noah Beery as Captain Michael Buckley
- Mary Brian as Millie O'Dowd
- Russell Gleason as Joe Riley
- George Brent as Jimmy Buckley
- Walter Percival as Proctor
- J. Carrol Naish as Hugo
- Frank Gallacher as Det Sgt Jerry Harris
- Pat O'Malley as Man
