= From Headquarters (1933 film) =

1933 film by William Dieterle

- Directed by: William Dieterle
- Written by: Robert N. Lee; Peter Milne
- Story by: Robert N. Lee
- Produced by: Samuel Bischoff (uncredited)
- Starring: George Brent; Margaret Lindsay; Eugene Pallette
- Cinematography: William Rees (as William Reese)
- Edited by: William Clemens
- Production company: Warner Bros. Pictures
- Distributed by: Warner Bros. Pictures
- Release date: November 16, 1933
- Running time: 62-65 minutes
- Country: United States
- Language: English
- Budget: $105,000
- Box office: $338,000

From Headquarters is a 1933 American pre-Code murder mystery film starring George Brent, Margaret Lindsay and Eugene Pallette, and directed by William Dieterle.

== Plot ==
It is a typical day at the main police headquarters in a large unnamed city. The press room is full of half-asleep cynical reporters, a busy switchboard, and small-time criminals who relish the attention of getting their mug shots and fingerprints taken. Inept bail bondsman Manny Wales wanders the hallways, futilely searching for clients.

Suspected bank robber Muggs Manton seems to be "the catch of the day". But when notorious womanizing playboy Gordon Bates is found shot to death in his penthouse, Manton is literally reduced to the role of bench-warmer.

Detectives Stevens and Boggs are assigned to the case. Stevens is handsome, cool, and collected. Boggs is blustery, and his modus operandi is to accuse first, find out facts later. Stevens is discomfited to find out his former girlfriend, Lou Ann Winton, is a chief suspect as she had tried to break off her engagement to Bates, only to have him attempt to sexually assault her. She had been rescued by her brother, who beat Bates up and hustled her out of the apartment. To get out himself, he had to point a gun at Bates, which could explain how his fingerprints got on the presumed murder weapon.

Dr. Van Der Water, a wizened little man whose favorite expression is "a nice, juicy murder", makes repeated discoveries in the forensics lab, with each new discovery exploding the previous solution to the crime. First, it is discovered the murder weapon was an antique dueling pistol that fired a musket ball, and that its twin was the murder weapon (it had no prints on it, so it was at first ignored). Second, analysis of stomach contents places the death two hours later than originally thought, between 11 PM and midnight. A heavy dose of cocaine is also found in Bates' system, which would have given him enhanced strength.

The elegant Anderzian, who says he is an Oriental rug importer, seems eager to examine the contents of the deceased's safe. A police cracksman opens it and finds strong evidence that Bates made his wealth through blackmail. They also uncover another woman who saw Bates between 11 and midnight, had another fight with him, and knocked him unconscious with a statuette. The Wintons can account for their whereabouts after 10 PM, so they are eliminated as suspects.

Wales discovers Muggs Manton's dead body in a janitor's closet, his throat slashed, putting him in the interrogation room. But invisible ink tests on the recovered letters reveal Anderzian to be Bates' partner in blackmail. The building is sealed, and he is arrested. It develops that at midnight, Anderzian had hired Muggs to crack the safe and recover the letters, but wandered into the other room and found Bates already dead. The mission was aborted, and he hustled Muggs out before he could see the body.

Stevens quietly takes aside Bates' valet, Horton, who had discovered his master's body, and tells him he found out he was a crack rifleman in the British Army during World War I. In between the braining with the statuette and Anderzian's visit, Horton had tried to crack the safe and destroy the blackmail material in sympathy with the Wintons. Bates revived and shot at Horton, who fired back and killed him. He then wiped off his prints and put the gun back its display case. Since the killing was obviously self-defense, Stevens sees no reason to publicize this development.

== Cast ==
- George Brent as Lieutenant J. Stevens
- Margaret Lindsay as Lou Ann Winton
- Eugene Pallette as Sergeant Boggs
- Robert Barrat as Anderzian
- Henry O'Neill as Inspector Donnelly
- Hugh Herbert as Manny Wales
- Dorothy Burgess as Dolly White
- Theodore Newton as Jack Winton
- Hobart Cavanaugh as Muggs Manton
- Ken Murray as Mac
- Murray Kinnell as Horton
- Edward Ellis as Dr. Van de Water
- Kenneth Thomson as Gordon Bates
- Harry Woods as Officer Mullins (uncredited)
- Al St. John as suspect stealing cigarettes (uncredited)
- Matt McHugh as arson suspect in opening scene (uncredited)
- Hank Mann as Al Cohen (uncredited)
- Wilfred Lucas as intake officer (uncredited)

== Reception ==
The New York Times review was lukewarm, calling it "a tidbit for the hardier addicts of the mystery melodramas. Less specialized students of the cinema are likely to find in it only the mildest sort of entertainment." However, the reviewer did praise the cast as "uniformly pleasant".

According to Warner Bros records, the film earned $228,000 domestically and $110,000 foreign.
