= Happiness Ahead (1934 film) =

1934 film by Mervyn LeRoy

- Directed by: Mervyn LeRoy
- Screenplay by: Brian Marlow; Harry Sauber
- Produced by: First National Pictures
- Starring: Dick Powell; Josephine Hutchinson
- Cinematography: Tony Gaudio
- Edited by: William Clemens
- Music by: Leo F. Forbstein
- Distributed by: Warner Bros. Pictures
- Release date: October 27, 1934
- Running time: 86 minutes
- Country: United States
- Language: English

Happiness Ahead is a 1934 American comedy film directed by Mervyn LeRoy and starring Dick Powell with Josephine Hutchinson. This was Hutchinson's (credited) debut.

== Plot ==
Joan Bradford is a society heiress who rebels against her mother's choice of a future husband by masquerading as a working-class girl and dating a window washer.

== Cast ==
- Dick Powell as Bob Lane
- Josephine Hutchinson as Joan Bradford
- John Halliday as Henry Bradford
- Frank McHugh as Tom
- Allen Jenkins as Chuck
- Ruth Donnelly as Anna
- Dorothy Dare as Josie
- Marjorie Gateson as Mrs. Bradford
- Gavin Gordon as "Jellie" Travis
- Russell Hicks as Jim Meehan
- Mary Forbes as Mrs. Travis
- J. M. Kerrigan as The Boss
- Mary Treen as The Girl
- Jane Darwell as Landlady
- George Chandler as Window Washer (uncredited)

== Reception ==
Andre Sennwald, critic for The New York Times, called it "a winning and agreeable film", adding: "Mervyn LeRoy, the director of detonating screen melodramas, goes soft and sentimental in his new work without losing his grip on life. "Happiness Ahead" has a continuously warming effect and it produces a mood of benevolence and good cheer. In addition to the strawberry and heart-popping tunes, there are the title number and "Beauty Must Be Loved," which have a good uplift percentage in Dick Powell's sunny tenor. Mr. LeRoy seems to have made a lot out of a little.

== Preservation status ==
The film is preserved in the Library of Congress Packard Campus for Audio-Visual Conservation collection.
