= Sidney Hickox =

American cinematographer (1895–1982)

Sidney Hickox, A.S.C.
- Born: Sidney Barnett Hickox; July 15, 1895; New York City, US
- Died: May 16, 1982 (aged 86); La Canada, California, US
- Other name: Sid Hickox
- Occupation: Cinematographer
- Years active: 1916–1968
- Spouse: Edna Mehlich

Sidney Barnett Hickox, A.S.C. (July 15, 1895 – May 16, 1982) was an American film and television cinematographer. He had a long association with Warner Bros. Pictures and was a frequent collaborator of directors Howard Hawks and Raoul Walsh.

== Career ==
Sidney Barnett Hickox was born in New York city on July 15, 1895. He started his film career at the age of 20 as an assistant cameraman at Manhattan's Biograph Studios and quickly became a full-time director of photography with Gloria's Romance in 1916.

Following World War I, where he was a photographer for the US Naval Air Service, he relocated to Hollywood and joined the staff of First National Pictures. When the studio was absorbed by Warner Bros. in 1928, he remained there and worked on hundreds of projects until his retirement from feature films.

Hickox also directed multiple episodes of the TV series I Love Lucy and The Lucy-Desi Comedy Hour during their final seasons, as well as most of the episodes of The Andy Griffith Show during its lengthy run.

Hickox died in La Canada, California, on May 16, 1982, at the age of 86.

== Filmography ==
- Gloria's Romance (1916)
- Democracy – The Vision Restored (1920)
- School Days (1921)
- Your Best Friend (1922)
- Marriage Morals (1923)
- Those Who Dance (1924)
- The Little Giant (1926)
- The Private Life of Helen of Troy (1927)
- Sailors' Wives (1928)
- Happiness Ahead (1928)
- Oh, Kay! (1928)
- Lilac Time (1928)
- Synthetic Sin (1929)
- Why Be Good? (1929)
- Hot Stuff (1929)
- Two Weeks Off (1929)
- Smiling Irish Eyes (1929)
- Footlights and Fools (1929)
- The Love Racket (1929)
- Strictly Modern (1930)
- Those Who Dance (1930)
- Contre-enquête (1930)
- The Dance Goes On (1930)
- The Flirting Widow (1930)
- Sweet Mama (1930)
- Top Speed (1930)
- The Way of All Men (1930)
- The Mask Falls (1931)
- The Gorilla (1930)
- The Naughty Flirt (1930)
- Too Young to Marry (1931)
- Party Husband (1931)
- Broadminded (1931)
- The Last Flight (1931)
- Pleasure (1931)
- Convicted (1931)
- Blonde Crazy (1931)
- The Sea Ghost (1931)
- Safe in Hell (1931)
- The Hatchet Man (1931)
- So Big! (1932)
- The Crowd Roars (1932)
- Love Is a Racket (1932)
- The Purchase Price (1932)
- A Bill of Divorcement (1932)
- Central Park (1932)
- Frisco Jenny (1932)
- Christopher Strong (1933)
- The Little Giant (1933)
- Grand Slam (1933)
- Central Airport (1933)
- Mary Stevens, M.D. (1933)
- The Avenger (1933)
- Sensation Hunters (1933)
- Female (1933)
- The Big Shakedown (1933)
- Heat Lightning (1933)
- Twenty Million Sweethearts (1933)
- Bedside (1934)
- Registered Nurse (1934)
- The Circus Clown (1934)
- Dames (1934)
- A Lost Lady (1934)
- I Sell Anything (1934)
- The St. Louis Kid (1934)
- O, Sailor Behave! (1934)
- Living on Velvet (1934)
- I Am a Thief (1934)
- The Right to Live (1935)
- Stranded (1935)
- Bright Lights (1935)
- The Goose and the Gander (1935)
- Special Agent (1935)
- I Found Stella Parish (1935)
- The Case of the Velvet Claws (1936)
- Trailin' West (1936)
- Brides Are Like That (1936)
- Give Me Your Heart (1936)
- Freshman Love (1936)
- Two Against the World (1936)
- The Law in Her Hands (1936)
- Missing Witnesses (1937)
- Confession (1937)
- Slim (1937)
- Stolen Holiday (1937)
- San Quentin (1937)
- First Lady (1937)
- Secrets of an Actress (1938)
- Women Are Like That (1938)
- A Slight Case of Murder (1938)
- Men Are Such Fools (1938)
- My Bill (1938)
- King of the Underworld (1939)
- Indianapolis Speedway (1939)
- Women in the Wind (1939)
- Blackwell's Island (1939)
- Everybody's Hobby (1939)
- The Return of Doctor X (1939)
- The Kid from Kokomo (1939)
- King of the Lumberjacks (1940)
- The Man Who Talked Too Much (1940)
- The Doctor Takes a Wife (1940)
- East of the River (1940)
- Tear Gas Squad (1940)
- Flowing Gold (1940)
- Hal Kemp and His Orchestra (1940)
- British Intelligence (1940)
- The Wagons Roll at Night (1941)
- Thieves Fall Out (1941)
- Law of the Tropics (1941)
- Underground (1941)
- Always in My Heart (1942)
- All Through the Night (1942)
- Gentleman Jim (1942)
- The Big Shot (1942)
- Northern Pursuit (1943)
- Edge of Darkness (1943)
- To Have and Have Not (1944)
- Uncertain Glory (1944)
- The Horn Blows at Midnight (1945)
- God is My Co-Pilot (1945)
- The Big Sleep (1946)
- Cheyenne (1947)
- Dark Passage (1947)
- The Man I Love (1947)
- Silver River (1948)
- One Sunday Afternoon (1948)
- Fighter Squadron (1948)
- Colorado Territory (1949)
- White Heat (1949)
- The Great Jewel Robber (1950)
- The West Point Story (1950)
- Three Secrets (1950)
- Lightning Strikes Twice (1951)
- Distant Drums (1951)
- Fort Worth (1951)
- Along the Great Divide (1951)
- The Winning Team (1952)
- Blowing Wild (1953)
- So You Want to Learn to Dance (1953)
- Them! (1954)
- Battle Cry (1955)
