= Las Vegas Shakedown =

1955 film directed by Sidney Salkow

- Directed by: Sidney Salkow
- Written by: Steve Fisher
- Produced by: William F. Broidy
- Starring: Dennis O'Keefe; Coleen Gray; Charles Winninger
- Cinematography: John Martin
- Edited by: Ace Herman; Chandler House
- Music by: Edward J. Kay
- Production company: William F. Broidy Pictures
- Distributed by: Allied Artists Pictures
- Release date: May 15, 1955 (US)
- Running time: 79 minutes
- Country: United States
- Language: English

Las Vegas Shakedown is a 1955 American film noir crime film directed by Sidney Salkow from an original screenplay by Steve Fisher. The film stars Dennis O'Keefe, Coleen Gray, and Charles Winninger, and was released on May 15, 1955.

== Cast ==
- Dennis O'Keefe as Joe Barnes
- Coleen Gray as Julia L. Rae
- Charles Winninger as Ernest Raff
- Thomas Gomez as Al "Gimpy" Sirago
- Dorothy Patrick as Dorothy Reid
- Mary Beth Hughes as Mabel Dooley
- Elizabeth Patterson as Mary Raff
- James Millican as Wheeler Reid
- Robert Armstrong as Doc
- Joseph Downing as Matty
- Lewis Martin as Collins
- Mara McAfee as Angela
- Charles Fredericks as Sheriff Charlie Woods
- Regina Gleason as Maxine Miller
- Murray Alper as House manager
- James Alexander as Sam Costar
- Frank Hanley as Milton Dooley
- Allen Mathews as Rick
