= Charles Winninger =

American actor (1884–1969)

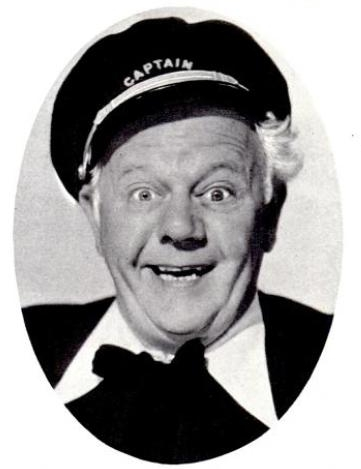
- Winninger as Captain Henry on the radio show Maxwell House Show Boat (1937)
- Born: Charles John Winninger; May 26, 1884; Athens, Wisconsin, U.S.
- Died: January 27, 1969 (aged 84); Palm Springs, California, U.S.
- Resting place: Forest Lawn Memorial Park, Hollywood Hills, Los Angeles, California
- Occupation: Actor
- Years active: 1910–1960
- Known for: Show Boat; Three Smart Girls; Night Nurse; State Fair; Nothing Sacred; Ziegfeld Girl
- Spouses: Blanche Ring (m. 1912; div. 1951) Gertrude Walker (m. 1951)

Charles John Winninger (May 26, 1884 – January 27, 1969) was an American stage and film actor, most often cast in comedies or musicals.

== Life and career ==
Winninger was born in Athens, Wisconsin, the son of Rosalia (née Grassler) and Franz Winninger. His parents were Austrian immigrants. He began as a vaudeville actor. In 1926 he starred in Oh, Please! with Beatrice Lillie, Helen Broderick, and Charles Purcell. His most famous stage role was as Cap'n Andy Hawks in the original production of Show Boat, the Jerome Kern/Oscar Hammerstein II musical classic, in 1927. He played the role in the 1932 stage revival and the 1936 film version of the show. He became so identified with the role and with his persona as a riverboat captain that he played several variations of the role, notably on the radio program Maxwell House Show Boat, which was clearly inspired by the Broadway musical.

Winninger's pre-Code film career includes Night Nurse, a 1931 drama about two girls being systematically starved to death by the family chauffeur. Winninger portrays a kindly physician who attempts to save the suffering children. After the film of Show Boat in 1936, Winninger appeared in 1936's Three Smart Girls (as the father of Deanna Durbin's character), 1937's Nothing Sacred (as the drunken doctor who misdiagnoses Carole Lombard's character), 1939's Destry Rides Again (as Wash, the sheriff), 1941's Ziegfeld Girl (as the father of Judy Garland's character), and 1945's State Fair (as Abel Frake). He returned to Broadway only once for the 1951 revival of Kern and Hammerstein's Music in the Air.

Winninger had the lead role in only one film, 1953's The Sun Shines Bright, John Ford's remake of Judge Priest. Winninger played the role that Will Rogers portrayed in 1934.

Winninger made a notable television appearance in 1954 in I Love Lucy as Barney Kurtz, the former vaudevillian partner of Fred Mertz (played by William Frawley) in an episode titled "Mertz and Kurtz". He made his last film in 1960.

== Personal life ==
On November 12, 1912, Winninger married actress Blanche Ring. They were divorced on June 12, 1951. He married Gertrude Walker later that year; they remained married until his death.

Winninger died in 1969 and is buried at Forest Lawn Memorial Park-Hollywood Hills in Los Angeles.

== Recognition ==
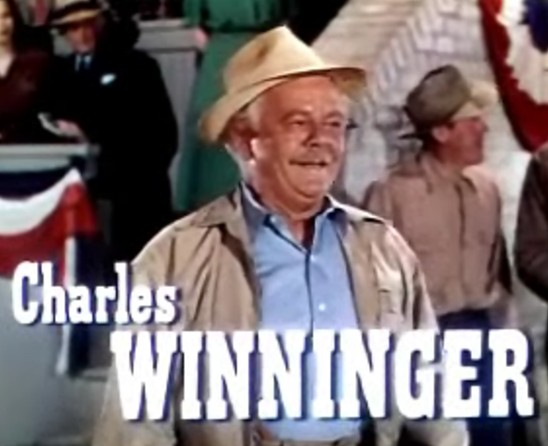
Winninger in State Fair (1945)

In 1960, Winninger received a star on the Hollywood Walk of Fame for his radio contributions.

== Filmography ==
- Mister Flirt in Wrong (1915, Short) as Mr. Rawsberry
- Lizzie's Shattered Dreams (1915, Short) as 2nd Stranger from the City
- The Doomed Groom (1915, Short) as The Groom
- A September Mourning (1916, Short) as The Artist
- Pied Piper Malone (1924) - Louie as the Barber
- The Canadian (1926) as Pop Tyson
- Summer Bachelors (1926) as Preston Smith
- Soup to Nuts (1930) as Otto Schmidt
- Fighting Caravans (1931) as Marshall
- Bad Sister (1931) as Mr. Madison
- Gun Smoke (1931) as Tack Gillup
- God's Gift to Women (1931) as John Churchill
- Night Nurse (1931) as Dr. Arthur Bell
- Children of Dreams (1931) as Dr. Joe Thompson
- The Sin of Madelon Claudet (1931) as M. Novella, Photographer
- Flying High (1931) as Doctor Brown
- Husband's Holiday (1931) as Mr. Reid
- Social Register (1934) as Jonesie
- Show Boat (1936) as Cap'n Andy Hawks
- White Fang (1936) as Doc McFane
- Three Smart Girls (1936) as Judson Craig
- Woman Chases Man (1937) as B.J. Nolan
- Cafe Metropole (1937) as Joseph Ridgeway
- The Go Getter (1937) as Cappy Ricks
- You Can't Have Everything (1937) as Sam Gordon
- Nothing Sacred (1937) as Dr. Enoch Downer
- Every Day's a Holiday (1937) as Van Reighle Van Pelter Van Doon
- You're a Sweetheart (1937) as Cherokee Charlie
- Goodbye Broadway (1938) as Pat Malloy
- Hard to Get (1938) as Ben Richards
- Three Smart Girls Grow Up (1939) as Judson Craig
- Babes in Arms (1939) as Joe Moran
- Destry Rides Again (1939) as Washington Dimsdale
- Barricade (1939) as Samuel J. Cady
- If I Had My Way (1940) as Joe Johnson
- Beyond Tomorrow (1940) as Michael O'Brien
- My Love Came Back (1940) as Julius Malette
- Little Nellie Kelly (1940) as Michael Noonan
- Pot o' Gold (1941) as C.J. Haskell
- Ziegfeld Girl (1941) as 'Pop' Gallagher
- The Getaway (1941) as Dr. Josiah Glass
- My Life with Caroline (1941) as Bliss
- Mister Gardenia Jones (1942, Documentary short) as John Jones
- Friendly Enemies (1942) as Karl Pfeiffer
- Coney Island (1943) as Finnigan
- Hers to Hold (1943) as Judson Craig
- A Lady Takes a Chance (1943) as Waco
- Flesh and Fantasy (1943) as King Lamarr (Episode 3)
- Broadway Rhythm (1944) as Sam Demming
- Sunday Dinner for a Soldier (1944) as Dudley 'Granfeathers' Osborne
- Belle of the Yukon (1944) as Pop Candless
- State Fair (1945) as Abel Frake
- She Wouldn't Say Yes (1945) as Doctor Lane
- Lover Come Back (1946) as William 'Pa' Williams, Sr.
- Living in a Big Way (1947) as D. Rutherford Morgan
- Something in the Wind (1947) as Uncle Chester Read
- The Inside Story (1948) as Uncle Ed
- Give My Regards to Broadway (1948) as Albert Norwick
- Father Is a Bachelor (1950) as Professor Mordecai Ford
- Torpedo Alley (1952) as Oliver J. Peabody
- The Sun Shines Bright (1953) as Judge William Pittman Priest
- A Perilous Journey (1953) as Captain Eph Allan
- Champ for a Day (1953) as Pa Karlsen
- Those Were the Days (1953, TV Movie)
- Las Vegas Shakedown (1955) as Ernest Raff
- Raymie (1960) as R.J. Parsons
- The Miracle of the White Reindeer (1960) as Zoo Keeper

== Radio appearances ==
Year	Program	Episode/source
1942	Philip Morris Playhouse	Friendly Enemies
