= More Than a Secretary =

1936 film by Alfred E. Green

- Theatrical release poster
- Directed by: Alfred E. Green
- Screenplay by: Dale Van Every; Lynn Starling
- Story by: Ethel Hill; Aben Kandel
- Based on: "Safari in Manhattan"; 1936 story in Collier's by Matt Taylor
- Produced by: Everett Riskin (associate producer)
- Starring: Jean Arthur; George Brent; Lionel Stander; Ruth Donnelly; Reginald Denny; Dorothea Kent
- Cinematography: Henry Freulich
- Edited by: Al Clark
- Music by: Dimitri Tiomkin (uncredited)
- Production company: Columbia Pictures
- Distributed by: Columbia Pictures
- Release date: December 24, 1936 (United States)
- Running time: 77 minutes
- Country: United States
- Language: English

More Than a Secretary is a 1936 American romantic comedy film directed by Alfred E. Green and starring Jean Arthur, George Brent and Ruth Donnelly. It was produced and distributed by Columbia Pictures. The screenplay was written by Dale Van Every and Lynn Starling. The story was adapted by Ethel Hill and Aben Kandel, based on the magazine story "Safari in Manhattan" by Matt Taylor. It tells the story of a health magazine secretary who is in love with her boss.

== Plot ==
Carol Baldwin (Jean Arthur) and Helen Davis (Ruth Donnelly) are the owners and instructors of the Supreme Secretarial School. They are concerned about their student Maizie (Dorothea Kent), who cannot spell, take dictation or type. When the instructors ask her what she is doing at the school, she replies, "I'm here for the same reason that every other smart girl's here - to, uh, get a chance to meet nice men." They let her go. However, an equally inept former pupil drops by with a new student and informs them that she will marry a junior vice president, and Maizie gets hired on the spot, despite Carol's hint to her new employer that she is too inexperienced. This leads Carol to wonder if these women are onto something.

Mr. Gilbert (George Brent), the editor of Body and Brain magazine, phones to complain to Carol. He has fired numerous graduates of the school. She goes to his office to find out first-hand what he expects. He mistakes her for the new secretary and tells her to report to work in the morning. She is quickly smitten with him and does not correct him.

Gilbert is a fitness fanatic. He has Ernest lead his staff in exercises at 11 o'clock and has them served a nutritious, if sparse, lunch. Mr. Crosby, the publisher and Gilbert's boss, is startled by and skeptical of Gilbert's methods.

At the end of the day, Carol is delighted when Gilbert invites her to dinner. She orders a steak, but it tastes terrible. Gilbert informs her that it is made of vegetables and nuts. When she gets home, she complains to her roommate Helen, then enjoys a real steak.

When Carol tries to improve Gilbert's latest article with some "cheesecake" photos of scantily clad women, he rejects them. He is then told by Crosby to fix Body and Brain's declining circulation, but he still rejects Carol's suggestions. When he catches a cold, Carol implements her changes without permission, so Gilbert fires her. Later, Gilbert apologizes; the latest issue has sold out. He rehires her and agrees to soften his office rules. Their relationship heats up.

Then his friend Bill Houston asks him for a favor. Bill's wife is returning from Europe, and he needs to get rid of his attractive blonde secretary, none other than Maizie. However, after speaking to Maizie, Gilbert declines to hire her. Then he promotes Carol to associate editor and makes Maizie her replacement, much to Carol's dismay. Soon Gilbert is out night after night with Maizie, neglecting his work, which Carol has to take on. Finally, Carol quits in disgust while Gilbert is away in Atlantic City with Maizie.

Gilbert finally realizes he is in love with Carol. When Maizie refuses to leave her job, Gilbert suggests Mr. Crosby hire her. After seeing her, Crosby agrees. However, when Gilbert tries to see Carol, he finds she and Helen have moved away. He has an idea, however; he writes to her through his magazine, infuriating her. It works. When she comes back, he proposes to her.

== Cast ==
- Jean Arthur as Carol Baldwin
- George Brent as Fred Gilbert
- Lionel Stander as Ernest
- Ruth Donnelly as Helen Davis
- Reginald Denny as Bill Houston
- Dorothea Kent as Maizie West
- Charles Halton as Mr. Crosby
- Geraldine Hall as Enid

== Home media ==
The film is available on DVD as part of the Jean Arthur Comedy Collection, released by Sony Pictures Home Entertainment.
