= Slave Girl (1947 film) =

1947 film by Charles Lamont

- Theatrical release poster
- Directed by: Charles Lamont
- Written by: Michael Fessier; Ernest Pagano
- Produced by: Michael Fessier; Ernest Pagano
- Starring: Yvonne De Carlo; George Brent
- Cinematography: W. Howard Greene; George Robinson
- Edited by: Frank Gross
- Music by: Milton Rosen
- Distributed by: Universal Pictures
- Release date: July 17, 1947 (New York City)
- Running time: 80 minutes
- Country: United States
- Language: English
- Budget: >$1.6 million
- Box office: $2 million (US rentals)

Slave Girl is a 1947 American Technicolor adventure comedy film directed by Charles Lamont and starring Yvonne De Carlo and George Brent.

== Plot ==
When American playboy Matt Claiborne embarks on a mission to Tripoli, he finds forbidden love and political intrigue when he falls for a dancing girl involved with rival lords. Matt is supposed to trade gold with the pasha for American sailors being held hostage. However, the pasha's fiancée Francesca steals it, hoping to finance her lover El Hamid's revolution. But when El Hamid betrays Francesca, she and Matt join forces and find true love.

== Cast ==
- Yvonne De Carlo as Francesca
- George Brent as Matt Claibourne aka Pierre
- Broderick Crawford as Chips Jackson
- Albert Dekker as Pasha
- Lois Collier as Aleta
- Andy Devine as Ben the Fat Sailor
- Arthur Treacher as Thomas 'Liverpool' Griswold
- Carl Esmond as El Hamid
- Dan Seymour as Telek the Tuareg Chieftain
- Philip Van Zandt as Yusef
- Trevor Bardette as Hadji the Cafe Proprietor

== Production ==
The film was originally titled The Flame of Tripoli. It was announced in April 1946 with Yvonne De Carlo and George Brent attached, and was written and produced by the team of Michael Fessiner and Ernest Pagano, who had produced Frontier Gal with De Carlo. Dona Drake was to appear in the film but fell ill and was replaced by Lois Collier. The film's budget was $1.6 million. The film was envisioned as a melodrama, but during the shoot the producers opted to add more comedy elements.

Filming commenced on July 18, 1946. Parts of the film were shot in Paria Canyon and the Coral Pink Sand Dunes State Park in Utah.

By the time that the film was screened for preview audiences, Universal had merged with International and the film came under the supervision of William Dozier. The reception to preview screenings was negative, so Dozier inserted a title card featuring a camel that indicated that the film was to be a comedy. This was previewed to more positive response, so Dozier arranged for additional scenes involving the camel commenting on the action.

De Carlo was unhappy because several of her dances were removed from the final film. She also felt that Brent was too old for his part.

== Reception ==
The film was a hit at the box office, earning more than $2 million in the U.S.

In a contemporary review for the Los Angeles Times, critic Edwin Schallert wrote: "[E]ven the producers seem to have discovered that these 'oriental' melodramas are idiotic. ... 'Slave Girl' is everything fantastic that might come out of a hookah pipe."

A. H. Weiler of The New York Times called Slave Girl "neither good flesh nor fanciful fiction" and wrote: "The corn in this concoction is tasteless because the producers have vacillated disastrously between straight spoof and common comedy styles."

== See also ==
- Barbary Pirate (1949)
- Tripoli (1950)
