= George Brent =

Irish-American actor (1904–1979)

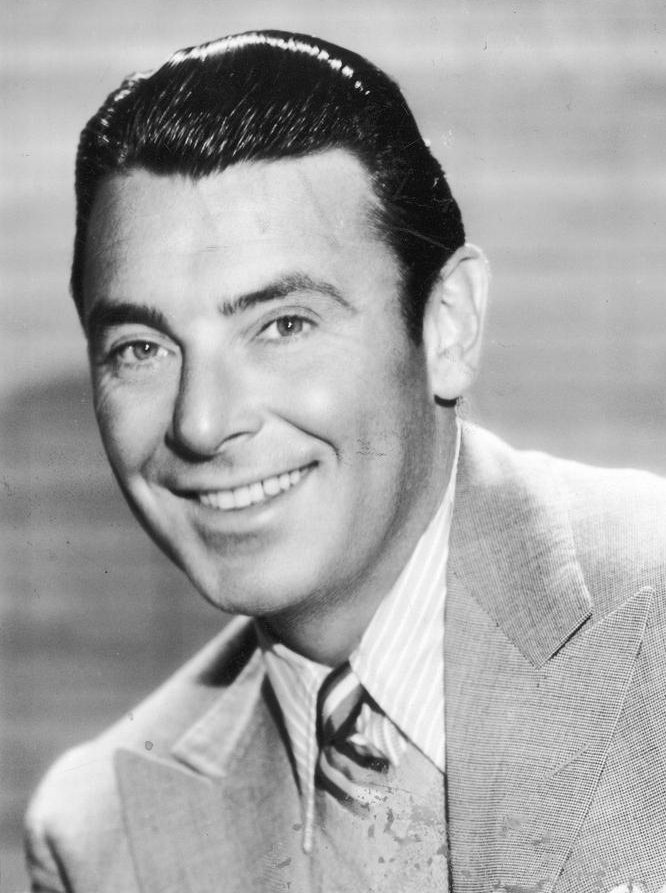
- Brent in 1939
- Born: George Brendan Nolan; 15 March 1904; Ballinasloe, Ireland
- Died: 26 May 1979 (aged 75); Solana Beach, California, U.S.
- Occupation: Actor
- Years active: 1924–1960, 1978
- Spouses: Helen Louise Campbell (m. 1925; div. 1927) Ruth Chatterton (m. 1932; div. 1934) Constance Worth (m. 1937; div. 1937) Ann Sheridan (m. 1942; div. 1943) Janet Michaels (m. 1947; died 1974)
- Children: 2

George Brent (born George Brendan Nolan; 15 March 1904 – 26 May 1979) was an Irish-American stage, film, and television actor. He is best remembered for the eleven films he made with Bette Davis, which included Jezebel and Dark Victory.

== Early life ==
Brent was born in Ballinasloe, County Galway, Ireland on 15 March 1904, to John J. and Mary (née McGuinness) Nolan. His father was a shopkeeper and his mother was a native of Clonfad, Moore, County Roscommon. In September 1915, he moved with his younger sister Kathleen to New York City. There, they joined their mother, who was living in the US after her separation from her husband.

Brent returned to Ireland in February 1921, during the Irish War of Independence (1919–1922), and was involved in the Irish Republican Army. During this period he also became involved with the Abbey Theatre.

He fled Ireland with a bounty set on his head by the British government, although he later claimed only to have been a courier for guerrilla leader and tactician Michael Collins. According to Ballinasloe Life (volume 2, issue 4, Oct/Nov 2012), the Irish War of Independence careers of three different men named George Nolan (Brent and two others; one from County Dublin and the other from County Offaly) were apparently conflated, which may explain some of the discrepancies regarding Brent's year of birth, life, and activities during the 1919 to 1922 period.

== Career ==
=== American stage career ===
Brent travelled from England to Canada and returned to the United States in August 1921.

He decided to become a professional actor. He made his Broadway debut in director Guthrie McClintic’s The Dover Road. He did numerous plays throughout the 1920s, including running several of his own stock companies. He appeared in productions of Abie's Irish Rose (on tour for two years), Stella Dallas, Up in Mabel's Room, Elmer the Great, Seventh Heaven, White Cargo and Lilac Time. He acted in stock companies at Elitch Theatre, in Denver, Colorado (1929), as well as Rhode Island, Florida, and Massachusetts. In 1930, he appeared on Broadway in Love, Honor, and Betray, alongside Clark Gable.

=== Early films: Fox and Universal ===
Brent moved to Hollywood and made his first film for 20th Century Fox, Under Suspicion (1930). He continued in supporting roles for Fox in Once a Sinner (1931), Fair Warning (1931), and Charlie Chan Carries On (1931).

At Universal he was seventh-billed for Ex-Bad Boy (1931) and fifth for The Homicide Squad (1931), then was in the Rin Tin Tin serial The Lightning Warrior (1931) at Mascot Pictures.

=== Warner Bros. ===
Brent was signed by Warner Bros. in 1931, where he played Barbara Stanwyck's leading man in So Big! (1932), establishing him as a leading man. Bette Davis had a small role.

Brent appeared in The Rich Are Always with Us (1932) with Ruth Chatterton (who became his second wife that year), in which Davis again had a supporting role.

It was followed by Week-End Marriage (1932) with Loretta Young, The Purchase Price (1932) with Stanwyck, Miss Pinkerton (1932) with Joan Blondell, The Crash (1932) with Chatterton, and They Call It Sin (1932) with Young.

Paramount borrowed Brent for the leading-man role in Luxury Liner (1933). Back at Warners, he was one of several studio names in 42nd Street (1933), playing the lover of Bebe Daniels.

He returned to supporting female stars: Kay Francis in The Keyhole (1933), Chatterton in both Lilly Turner (1933) and Female (1933), and Stanwyck in Baby Face (1933).

In October 1933, he and Chatterton refused to make a film they had been assigned, Mandalay, and were replaced by Lyle Talbot and Kay Francis. Brent's salary was then $1,000 a week.

He was top-billed in From Headquarters (1933) with Margaret Lindsay; Metro-Goldwyn-Mayer borrowed him to play Myrna Loy's leading man in Stamboul Quest (1934). In September 1934, Chatteron filed for divorce.

=== Notable roles ===
Brent was top billed in Housewife (1934) with Bette Davis, who was his co star. He was leading man to Jean Muir in Desirable (1935) then MGM used him for The Painted Veil (1934) with Greta Garbo.

Brent supported Josephine Hutchinson in The Right to Live (1935), Francis in Living on Velvet (1935) and Stranded (1935). He then made two films with Davis, where she was top billed: Front Page Woman (1935) and Special Agent (1935).

Brent appeared in The Goose and the Gander (1935) with Kay Francis, then was borrowed by RKO to make In Person (1935) with Ginger Rogers. At Warners he was top billed in the comedy Snowed Under (1936), then Walter Wanger borrowed him to play Madeleine Carroll's leading man in The Case Against Mrs. Ames (1936).

At Warners he was reunited with Davis in The Golden Arrow (1936) and Francis in Give Me Your Heart (1936). Columbia borrowed him to support Jean Arthur in More Than a Secretary (1936) then Warners gave him top billing in God's Country and the Woman (1936) with Margaret Lindsay.

Brent made Mountain Justice (1937) with Hutchinson and The Go Getter (1937) with Anita Louise. Warners then put Brent in his first male-orientated movie: Submarine D-1 (1937) with Pat O'Brien and Wayne Morris. In November 1937 he became an American citizen.

Brent made Gold Is Where You Find It (1938) with Olivia de Havilland, then made Jezebel (1938) with Davis - only he was the second male lead, with Henry Fonda playing Davis' main love interest.

Warners put him in an action "B" film with Humphrey Bogart, Racket Busters (1938) then he was reunited with Francis in Secrets of an Actress (1938). He was in the military drama Wings of the Navy (1939) with de Havilland and John Payne.

He appeared in Dark Victory (1939) with Davis, which was a huge success. So too was The Old Maid (1939) where Davis and Miriam Hopkins fought over Brent. Both films were directed by Edmund Goulding.

20th Century Fox borrowed Brent for a key support role in The Rains Came (1939). At Warners he supported James Cagney and O'Brien in The Fighting 69th (1940).

Paramount borrowed him for Adventure in Diamonds (1940), where he had top billing over Isa Miranda. He was Merle Oberon's leading man in 'Til We Meet Again (1940), then starred in The Man Who Talked Too Much (1940) and South of Suez (1940). He supported Ann Sheridan in Honeymoon for Three (1941) and Davis in The Great Lie (1941).

Columbia borrowed him for the lead role in They Dare Not Love (1941) with Martha Scott and Edward Small used him in two films, International Lady (1941) with Ilona Massey and Twin Beds (1942) with Joan Bennett.

Brent made one final film with Davis, In This Our Life (1942), alongside de Havilland. He supported Stanwyck in The Gay Sisters (1942) and was top-billed in You Can't Escape Forever (1942) with Brenda Marshall and Silver Queen (1942) with Priscilla Lane.

=== Military service ===
In 1942, Brent, an accomplished pilot who had tried and, because of age, failed to enlist in the armed services, temporarily retired from films to teach flying as a civilian flight instructor with the Civilian Pilot Training Program, and later became a pilot in the U.S. Coast Guard for the duration of the war.

His final film for Warner Bros. was My Reputation his fifth and last film with Barbara Stanwyck, filmed from November 1943 to January 1944; except for previews for military audiences, it was not released until 1946. Brent acted on radio during this period.

=== Freelance actor ===
While Brent returned to his acting career after WWII, he never recaptured his former popularity, but during the immediate post war period he still remained a star of big budget films. RKO used him as Hedy Lamarr's leading man in Experiment Perilous (1944). For Hal Wallis he did The Affairs of Susan (1945) with Joan Fontaine, then Tomorrow Is Forever (1946) at International with Claudette Colbert and Orson Welles.

He returned to RKO for The Spiral Staircase (1946), a huge success. At Universal he was teamed with Lucille Ball in Lover Come Back (1946), then he made Temptation (1946) with Oberon and Edward Small at International.

Brent went to Eagle Lion to make a comedy Out of the Blue (1947) and Columbia for The Corpse Came C.O.D. (1947) with Blondell. Universal teamed him with Yvonne De Carlo in Slave Girl (1947).

Brent was one of several names in Christmas Eve (1947) for Benedict Bogeaus and Luxury Liner (1948) at MGM, a remake of the 1933 film in which Brent had appeared.

He went to Republic to star in Angel on the Amazon (1948) and in Universal's Red Canyon (1949) played the father of the star, Ann Blyth. At the same studio he was third lead in Illegal Entry (1949) then had the lead in a "B" The Kid from Cleveland (1949). He supported Colbert in Bride for Sale (1950) at RKO.

The budgets of Brent's films continued to shrink. He did two for Lippert Pictures: F.B.I. Girl (1951) and The Last Page (1952), the latter shot in England with Diana Dors. There was Montana Belle (1952) with Jane Russell then two for Monogram: Tangier Incident (1953) and Mexican Manhunt (1953).

=== Television ===
Brent moved into television in the early 1950s guest starring in The Revlon Mirror Theater, Crown Theatre with Gloria Swanson, The Ford Television Theatre, Climax!, Fireside Theatre, Stage 7, Studio 57, Science Fiction Theatre, Celebrity Playhouse, Schlitz Playhouse and the religion anthology series, Crossroads.

He was cast in the lead in the 1956 television series Wire Service, which ran for 39 episodes.

After appearing on Rawhide and The Chevy Mystery Show, Brent retired.

In 1978, he made one last film, Born Again.

In 1960, Brent was inducted into the Hollywood Walk of Fame with two stars. He received a motion-pictures star located at 1709 Vine Street and a second star located at 1612 Vine Street for his work in television.

== Personal life ==
Brent was married five times: to Helen Louise Campbell (1925–1927), Ruth Chatterton (1932–1934), Constance Worth (1937), Ann Sheridan (1942–1943), and Janet Michaels (1947–1974). Chatterton, Worth, and Sheridan were actresses; Chatterton and Sheridan were Warner Bros. players. His final marriage to Janet Michaels, a former model and dress designer, lasted 27 years until her death in 1974. They had two children: a daughter, Suzanne (born August 3, 1950), and a son, Barry (born November 26, 1954).

Brent also had an affair with Bette Davis, a frequent Warner Bros. co-star.

He suffered from emphysema and died of natural causes in 1979 in Solana Beach, California.

== Filmography ==
=== Feature films ===
Year	Film	Role	Co-Star
1924	The Iron Horse	Worker / Extra (uncredited)	
1930	Under Suspicion	Inspector Turner	
1931	Once a Sinner	James Brent	
1931	Fair Warning	Les Haines	
1931	Charlie Chan Carries On	Capt. Ronald Keane	Warner Oland
1931	Ex-Bad Boy	Donald Swift	
1931	The Homicide Squad	Jimmy	
1931	The Lightning Warrior	Alan Scott	Rin Tin Tin
1932	So Big!	Roelf Pool	Barbara Stanwyck
1932	The Rich Are Always With Us	Julian Tierney	Ruth Chatterton
1932	Week-End Marriage	Peter Acton	Loretta Young
1932	The Purchase Price	Jim Gilson	Barbara Stanwyck
1932	Miss Pinkerton	Police Inspector Patten	Joan Blondell
1932	The Crash	Geoffrey Gault	
1932	They Call It Sin	Dr. Travers	Loretta Young
1933	Luxury Liner	Dr. Thomas Bernard	
1933	42nd Street	Pat Denning	Ruby Keeler and Dick Powell
1933	The Keyhole	Neil Davis	Kay Francis
1933	Lilly Turner	Bob Chandler	Ruth Chatterton
1933	Baby Face	Trenholm	Barbara Stanwyck
1933	Female	Jim Thorne	Ruth Chatterton
1933	From Headquarters	Lieut. J. Stevens	
1934	Stamboul Quest	Douglas Beall	Myrna Loy
1934	Housewife	William Reynolds	Bette Davis
1934	Desirable	McAllister	Jean Muir
1934	The Painted Veil	Jack Townsend	Greta Garbo
1935	The Right to Live	Colin Trent	Josephine Hutchinson
1935	Living on Velvet	Terrence Clarence 'Terry' Parker	Kay Francis and Warren William
1935	Stranded	Mack Hale	Kay Francis
1935	Front Page Woman	Curt Devlin	Bette Davis
1935	Special Agent	Bill Bradford	Bette Davis
1935	The Goose and the Gander	Bob McNear	Kay Francis
1935	In Person	Emory Muir	Ginger Rogers
1936	Snowed Under	Alan Tanner	Glenda Farrell
1936	The Case Against Mrs. Ames	Matt Logan	Madeleine Carroll
1936	The Golden Arrow	Johnny Jones	Bette Davis
1936	Give Me Your Heart	Jim Baker	Kay Francis
1936	More Than a Secretary	Fred Gilbert	Jean Arthur
1937	God's Country and the Woman	Steve Russett	
1937	Mountain Justice	Paul Cameron	
1937	The Go Getter	Bill Austin	
1937	Submarine D-1	Lt. Commander Matthews	Pat O'Brien
1938	Gold Is Where You Find It	Jared Whitney	
1938	Jezebel	Buck Cantrell	Bette Davis
1938	Racket Busters	Denny Jordan	Humphrey Bogart
1938	Secrets of an Actress	Dick Orr	Kay Francis
1939	Wings of the Navy	Cass Harrington	
1939	Dark Victory	Dr. Frederick Steele	Bette Davis
1939	The Old Maid	Clem Spender	Bette Davis
1939	The Rains Came	Tom Ransome	Myrna Loy
1940	The Fighting 69th	"Wild Bill" Donovan	James Cagney
1940	Adventure in Diamonds	Capt. Stephen Dennett	
1940	'Til We Meet Again	Dan Hardesty	Merle Oberon
1940	The Man Who Talked Too Much	Stephen M. Forbes	
1940	South of Suez	John Gamble	Brenda Marshall
1941	Honeymoon for Three	Kenneth Bixby	Ann Sheridan
1941	The Great Lie	Peter Van Allen	Bette Davis
1941	They Dare Not Love	Prince Kurt von Rotenberg	
1941	International Lady	Tim Hanley	
1942	Twin Beds	Mike Abbott	Joan Bennett
1942	In This Our Life	Craig Fleming	Bette Davis, Olivia de Havilland
1942	The Gay Sisters	Charles Barclay	Barbara Stanwyck
1942	You Can't Escape Forever	Steve Mitchell	
1942	Silver Queen	James Kincaid	
1944	Experiment Perilous	Dr. Huntington Bailey	Hedy Lamarr
1945	The Affairs of Susan	Roger Berton	Joan Fontaine
1946	Tomorrow Is Forever	Lawrence Hamilton	
1946	My Reputation	Major Scott Landis	Barbara Stanwyck
1946	The Spiral Staircase	Professor Warren	Dorothy McGuire
1946	Lover Come Back	William 'Bill' Williams Jr.	
1946	Temptation	Nigel Armine	
1947	Out of the Blue	Arthur Earthleigh	
1947	The Corpse Came C.O.D.	Joe Medford	Joan Blondell
1947	Slave Girl	Matt Claibourne - aka Pierre	
1947	Christmas Eve	Michael Brooks	
1948	Luxury Liner	Captain Jeremy Bradford	
1948	Angel on the Amazon	Jim Warburton	Vera Ralston
1948	Red Canyon	Matthew Bostel	
1949	Illegal Entry	Chief Agent Dan Collins	
1949	The Kid from Cleveland	Mike Jackson	
1949	Bride for Sale	Paul Martin	
1951	FBI Girl	Jeff Donley	
1952	The Last Page	John Harman	
1952	Montana Belle	Tom Bradfield	
1953	Tangier Incident	Steve Gordon	
1953	Mexican Manhunt	David L. 'Dave' Brady	
1956	Death of a Scoundrel	O'Connell Party Guest (uncredited)	George Sanders
1978	Born Again	Judge Gerhard Gesell (final film role)	

=== Short subjects ===
Year	Film	Role
1935	A Dream Comes True (Documentary)	Himself
1938	Swingtime in the Movies	George Brent (uncredited)

== Radio appearances ==
Year	Program	Episode/source	Co Star
1938	Lux Radio Theatre	The Girl from 10th Avenue	Loretta Young
1938	Lux Radio Theatre	I Found Stella Parish	Herbert Marshall
1938	Lux Radio Theatre	Another Dawn	Madeleine Carroll
1939	Lux Radio Theatre	Mrs. Moonlight	Janet Gaynor
1939	Lux Radio Theatre	She Married Her Boss	Ginger Rogers
1939	Lux Radio Theatre	Only Yesterday	Barbara Stanwyck
1940	Lux Radio Theatre	The Rains Came	Kay Francis
1940	Lux Radio Theatre	Till We Meet Again	Merle Oberon
1940	Lux Radio Theatre	Wings of the Navy	Olivia de Havilland
1941	Lux Radio Theatre	Wife, Husband and Friend	Priscilla Lane
1942	Lux Radio Theatre	You Belong to Me	Merle Oberon
1943	Lux Radio Theatre	The Lady Is Willing	Kay Francis
1943	Lux Radio Theatre	My Friend Flicka	Roddy McDowall
1943	Lux Radio Theatre	Flight for Freedom	Rosalind Russell
1945	Lux Radio Theatre	The Affairs of Susan	Joan Fontaine
1946	Screen Guild Players	Experiment Perilous	Joan Bennett and Adolph Menjou
1947	Lux Radio Theatre	My Reputation	Barbara Stanwyck
1947	Lux Radio Theatre	The Other Love	Barbara Stanwyck
1953	Stars over Hollywood	Meet the Hero	n/a
