= In Person (film) =

1935 musical film by William A. Seiter

- Directed by: William A. Seiter; James Anderson (assistant)
- Written by: Allan Scott
- Based on: In Person novel by Samuel Hopkins Adams
- Produced by: Pandro S. Berman
- Starring: Ginger Rogers; George Brent; Alan Mowbray
- Cinematography: Edward Cronjager
- Edited by: Arthur P. Schmidt
- Music by: Roy Webb
- Production company: RKO Radio Pictures
- Distributed by: RKO Radio Pictures
- Release date: November 22, 1935
- Running time: 87 minutes
- Country: United States
- Language: English
- Budget: $493,000
- Box office: $715,000

In Person is a 1935 American romantic musical comedy film directed by William A. Seiter and starring Ginger Rogers, George Brent and Alan Mowbray.

== Plot ==
Glamorous movie star Carol Corliss has agoraphobia. Her fear of large groups of people, including her adoring fans, causes the actress to assume a veiled, buck-toothed disguise whenever she is in public. Carol's psychiatrist, Dr. Aaron Sylvester, recommends a vacation in the mountains as a cure. After she faints in a large crowd, outdoorsman Emory Muir rescues her, never believing the drab woman could be a movie star. Carol pretends to be the plain Miss Clara Colfax and convinces Muir to take her to his mountain retreat to recover. He reluctantly agrees, and allows Carol to stay in the lake cabin.

There, Emory sees her swimming undisguised and wonders as to her true identity. Emory phones her psychiatrist, who declines to name his patient. While in town, Emory discovers a picture of Carol Corliss and realizes his guest "Clara" is, in fact, the famous actress. Upon his return, Carol decides to reveal herself to Emory, but he acts unimpressed and pretends to disbelieve her. In the cabin, Carol hears herself on the radio singing "Got a New Lease on Life," and she sings and dances along for Emory to no avail. He is only "convinced" of her real persona once she takes him to the movie theatre where her newest film is showing.

Over time, Carol begins to realize she is falling for Emory. Matters are complicated further when Carol's frequent film co-star, Jay Holmes, arrives at the lake to confess his love for her.

== Cast ==
- Ginger Rogers as Carol Corliss/Clara Colfax
- George Brent as Emory Muir
- Alan Mowbray as Jay Holmes
- Grant Mitchell as Judge Thaddeus Parks
- Samuel S. Hinds as Dr. Aaron Sylvester
- Joan Breslau as Minna
- Louis Mason as Sheriff Twing
- Spencer Charters as Parson Calverton Lunk

== Production ==
In November 1934, the Hollywood Reporter wrote that Fred Astaire had been RKO's first choice for the male lead in the film. The studio borrowed George Brent from Warner Bros. for the role. Additionally, Ginger Rogers stated in her autobiography that Katharine Hepburn had turned down the role of Carol before Rogers accepted.

Released at the height of the Astaire/Rogers musical partnership, In Person was first and foremost a vehicle to showcase Ginger Rogers' singing and dancing. On a title lobby card for the film, she is billed as "Fresh from her great triumph in 'Top Hat'". Rogers wanted to prove to her public that she was more than just Astaire's dancing partner, and this film highlights her talents as a comedienne.

Parts of the film were shot on location at Big Bear Lake in California.

== Music ==
Rogers performed three musical numbers in the film: "Got a New Lease on Life", "Don't Mention Love To Me" and "Out of Sight, Out of Mind". The score was written by Oscar Levant (music) and Dorothy Fields (lyrics).

== Reception ==
=== Box office ===
The film made a modest box-office profit of $147,000, largely due to the strength of Ginger Rogers' popularity.

=== Critical response ===
In Person was well-received, but neither it nor its star could escape the shadow of the Astaire/Rogers musicals. In The Fred Astaire and Ginger Rogers Book, dance historian and critic Arlene Croce writes of the film, "Rogers' charm was irresistible, her skill variable." Croce goes on to highlight the difference between the musical numbers of In Person and those of the following Astaire/Rogers film Follow the Fleet; "[Rogers] goes ersatz in "Out of Sight, Out of Mind," slinking with a studiously lighted cigarette among men in dinner jackets, looking like a junior miss caught out in Ladies' Evening Wear. Yet only a year later she was the cream of sophistication in "Let's Face the Music and Dance. The difference: Astaire."
