= Ruth Donnelly =

American actress (1896–1982)

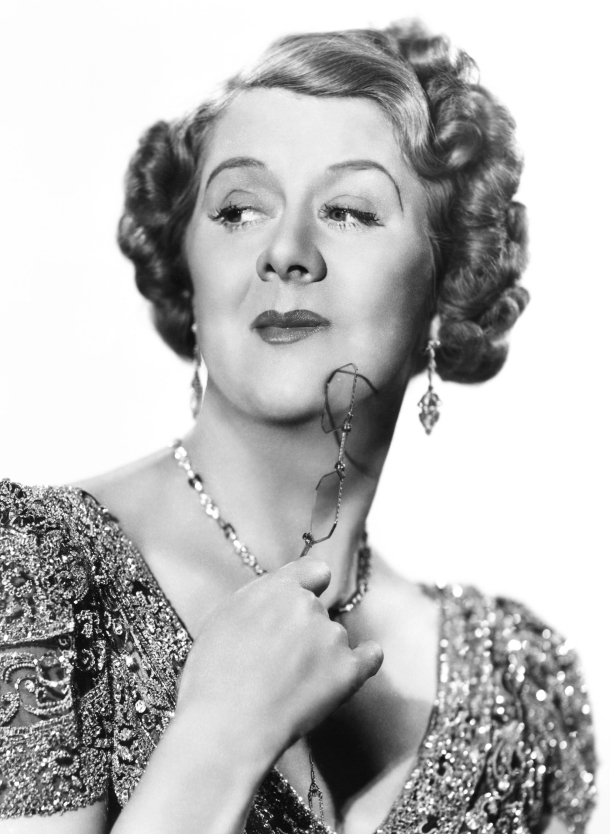
- Donnelly in 1939
- Born: May 17, 1896; Philadelphia, Pennsylvania, U.S.
- Died: November 17, 1982 (aged 86); New York City, U.S.
- Occupation: Actress
- Years active: 1913–1965
- Spouse: Basil de Guichard (m. 1932; died 1958)
- Relatives: Frederick W. Donnelly (uncle)

Ruth Donnelly (May 17, 1896 – November 17, 1982) was an American film and stage actress.

== Early years and family ==
Born in Philadelphia, Pennsylvania, Donnelly was the daughter of Harry Augustus and Bessie B. Donnelly.

Her uncle Frederick W. Donnelly was the longtime mayor of Trenton, New Jersey.

According to a 1915 article in The Day Book, Donnelly was forced to leave Sacred Heart Convent in New Jersey because she repeatedly laughed at inappropriate times.

== Career ==
Donnelly began her stage career at the age of 17 in The Quaker Girl. Actress Rose Stahl mentored Donnelly, and after training her with a year of experience in the chorus, placed her in the play Maggie Pepper. Her Broadway debut brought her to the attention of George M. Cohan, who proceeded to cast her in numerous comic-relief roles in musicals such as Going Up (1917).

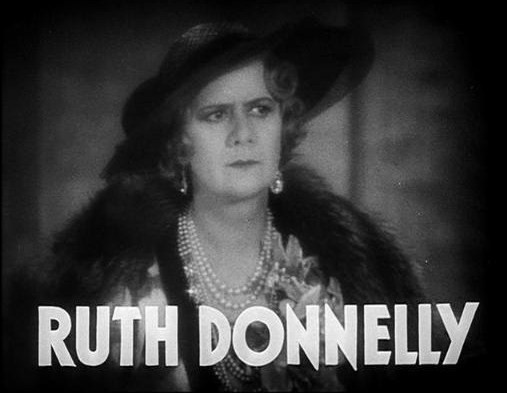
Donnelly in the trailer of Footlight Parade (1933)

Although Donnelly made her first film appearance in 1914, her Hollywood career began in 1931 and lasted until 1957. In her films, she often played the wife of Guy Kibbee (Footlight Parade, Wonder Bar, Merry Wives of Reno, Mr. Smith Goes to Washington). Among her roles was the part of Sister Michael in The Bells of St. Mary's, starring Bing Crosby and Ingrid Bergman. Years after her final film role, she returned to the stage as an understudy to Patsy Kelly in the Broadway revival of No No Nanette, and later she appeared in the touring production with Don Ameche and Evelyn Keyes.

== Personal life and death ==
Donnelly was married to AC Spark Plug executive Basil Winter de Guichard from 1932 until his death in 1958.

Donnelly died at Roosevelt Hospital in New York City at age 86.

== Complete filmography ==
- The Man Who Lost, But Won (1914 short) as Rose Mason, the Minister's Wife
- The Skull (1914 short)
- The Lady of the Island (1914 short) as The Nurse
- When the Heart Calls (1914 short)
- In All Things Moderation (1914 short) as Winnie Graham - the Youngest Daughter
- The Tenth Commandment (1914 short) as The Doctor's Wife
- Saved by a Song (1916 short) as Elsie
- Rubber Heels (1927) as Fanny Pratt
- Transatlantic (1931) as Burbank (scenes cut)
- The Spider (1931) as Mrs. Wimbledon
- Wicked (1931) as Fanny
- The Cheat (1931) as Woman in Court Behind Elsa (uncredited)
- The Rainbow Trail (1932) as Widow Abigail
- Make Me a Star (1932) as The Countess
- Jewel Robbery (1932) as Berta, Teri's Maid (uncredited)
- Blessed Event (1932) as Miss Stevens
- Employees' Entrance (1933) as Miss Hall
- Hard to Handle (1933) as Lil Waters
- Ladies They Talk About (1933) as Noonan
- Lilly Turner (1933) as Edna Yokum
- Private Detective 62 (1933) as Amy
- Sing Sinner Sing (1933) as Margaret "Maggie" Flannigan
- Goodbye Again (1933) as Richview Hotel Maid
- Bureau of Missing Persons (1933) as Pete
- Footlight Parade (1933) as Mrs. Harriet Gould
- Ever in My Heart (1933) as Lizzie, the Housekeeper
- 'Tis Spring (1933 short)
- Female (1933) as Miss Frothingham
- Havana Widows (1933) as Emily Jones
- Convention City (1933) as Mrs. Ellerbe
- Just Around the Corner (1933 short) as Mrs. Sears
- Mandalay (1934) as Mrs. George Peters
- Wonder Bar (1934) as Mrs. Simpson
- Heat Lightning (1934) as Mrs. Ashton-Ashley
- Merry Wives of Reno (1934) as Lois
- Housewife (1934) as Dora
- Romance in the Rain (1934) as Miss Sparks
- Happiness Ahead (1934) as Anna
- The White Cockatoo (1935) as Mrs. Byng
- Maybe It's Love (1935) as Florrie Sands
- Traveling Saleslady (1935) as Mrs. Twitchell
- Alibi Ike (1935) as Bess
- Red Salute (1935) as Mrs. Edith Rooney
- Hands Across the Table (1935) as Laura
- Personal Maid's Secret (1935) as Lizzie
- Song and Dance Man (1936) as Patsy O'Madigan
- Mr. Deeds Goes to Town (1936) as Mabel Dawson
- Thirteen Hours by Air (1936) as Vi Johnson
- Fatal Lady (1936) as Melba York
- Cain and Mabel (1936) as Aunt Mimi
- More Than a Secretary (1936) as Helen Davis
- Roaring Timber (1937) as Aunt Mary
- Portia on Trial (1937) as Jane Wilkins
- A Slight Case of Murder (1938) as Nora Marco
- Army Girl (1938) as Leila Kennett
- Meet the Girls (1938) as Daisy Watson
- Personal Secretary (1938) as Grumpy
- The Affairs of Annabel (1938) as Josephine (Jo)
- Annabel Takes a Tour (1938) as Josephine (Jo)
- The Family Next Door (1939) as Mrs. Pierce
- Mr. Smith Goes to Washington (1939) as Mrs. Hopper
- The Amazing Mr. Williams (1939) as Effie Perkins
- My Little Chickadee (1940) as Aunt Lou
- Scatterbrain (1940) as Miss Stevens
- Meet the Missus (1940) as Lil Higgins
- Petticoat Politics (1941) as Lil Higgins
- The Round Up (1941) as Polly Hope
- Model Wife (1941) as Mrs. Milo Everett
- The Gay Vagabond (1941) as Kate Dixon
- Sailors on Leave (1941) as Aunt Navy
- You Belong to Me (1941) as Emma
- Rise and Shine (1941) as Mame Bacon
- Johnny Doughboy (1942) as Biggy Biggsworth
- This Is the Army (1943) as Mrs. O'Brien
- Sleepy Lagoon (1943) as Sarah Rogers
- Thank Your Lucky Stars (1943) as Nurse Hamilton
- Pillow to Post (1945) as Mrs. Grace Wingate
- The Bells of St. Mary's (1945) as Sister Michael
- Cinderella Jones (1946) as Cora Elliot
- In Old Sacramento (1946) as Zebby Booker
- Cross My Heart (1946) as Eve Harper
- The Ghost Goes Wild (1947) as Aunt Susan Beecher
- Millie's Daughter (1947) as Helen Reilly
- Little Miss Broadway (1947) as Aunt Minerva Van Dorn
- The Fabulous Texan (1947) as Utopia Mills
- Fighting Father Dunne (1948) as Kate Mulvey
- The Snake Pit (1948) as Ruth
- Down to the Sea in Ships (1949) as New Bedford Neighbor (scenes cut)
- Where the Sidewalk Ends (1950) as Martha
- I'd Climb the Highest Mountain (1951) as Glory White
- The Secret of Convict Lake (1951) as Mary Fancher
- The Wild Blue Yonder (1951) as Maj. Ida Winton
- The Spoilers (1955) as Duchess
- A Lawless Street (1955) as Molly Higgins
- Autumn Leaves (1956) as Liz Eckhart
- The Way to the Gold (1957) as Mrs. Williams
