= Submarine D-1 =

1937 film by Lloyd Bacon

- Directed by: Lloyd Bacon
- Written by: Frank Wead; Cmdr. G. W. D. Dashielle
- Screenplay by: Frank Wead; Warren Duff; Lawrence Kimble; William Wister Haines
- Produced by: Jack L. Warner; Hal B. Wallis; Louis F. Edelman
- Starring: Pat O'Brien; George Brent; Wayne Morris
- Cinematography: Arthur Edeson
- Edited by: William Holmes
- Music by: Max Steiner
- Production company: Cosmopolitan Productions
- Distributed by: Warner Bros. Pictures
- Release date: November 27, 1937
- Running time: 100 minutes 94 minutes (Turner library print)
- Country: United States
- Language: English

Submarine D-1 is a 1937 American drama film directed by Lloyd Bacon and starring Pat O'Brien, George Brent and Wayne Morris. The film was produced by Cosmopolitan Productions and released by Warner Bros. Pictures.

== Plot ==
Butch Rogers and Sock McGillis are old submarine hands stationed in Panama. On land, Butch and Sock battle over pretty Ann Sawyer. At sea and underwater, however, our two heroes are virtually inseparable.

== Cast ==
- Pat O'Brien as 'Butch' Rogers
- George Brent as Lt. Commander Dan Matthews
- Wayne Morris as 'Sock' McGillis
- Frank McHugh as 'Lucky' Jones
- Doris Weston as Ann Sawyer
- Henry O'Neill as Admiral Thomas
- Dennie Moore as Arabella
- Veda Ann Borg as Dolly
- Regis Toomey as Tom Callan
