= William Keighley =

American actor and film director (1889-1984)

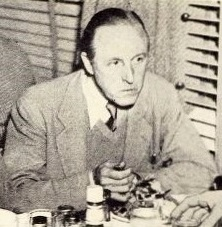
- Keighley in 1937
- Born: William Jackson Keighley; August 4, 1889; Philadelphia, Pennsylvania, U.S.
- Died: June 24, 1984 (aged 94); New York City, New York, U.S.
- Burial place: Forest Lawn Memorial Park, Glendale, California, U.S.
- Occupations: Actor; director
- Spouses: Elda Voelkel (m. 1931; div. 1936) Genevieve Tobin (m. 1938)

William Jackson Keighley (August 4, 1889 – June 24, 1984) was an American stage actor and Hollywood film director.

== Early years ==
Keighley was born on August 4, 1889, in Philadelphia. He studied at the Alliance française in Paris.

== Career ==
After graduating from the Ludlum School of Dramatic Art, Keighley began acting at the age of 23. By the 1910s and 1920s, he was acting and directing on Broadway. With the advent of talking pictures, he relocated to Hollywood. He eventually signed with Warner Bros. He was the initial director of The Adventures of Robin Hood, starring Errol Flynn and Olivia de Havilland, but was replaced by Michael Curtiz. During World War II, he supervised the First Motion Picture Unit of the United States Army Air Forces.

== Personal life ==
He retired in 1953 at the age of 64 and moved to Paris with his wife, Genevieve Tobin. In retirement, he became a photographer. He died of a stroke in New York City.

== Complete directorial filmography ==
- The Match King (1932) (co-director)
- Ladies They Talk About (1933) (co-director)
- Easy to Love (1934) (solo directorial debut and film with future wife Genevieve Tobin)
- Journal of a Crime (1934)
- Dr. Monica (1934)
- Kansas City Princess (1934)
- Big Hearted Herbert (1934)
- Babbitt (1934)
- The Right to Live (1935)
- G Men (1935)
- Mary Jane's Pa (1935)
- Special Agent (1935)
- Stars Over Broadway (1935)
- The Singing Kid (1936)
- Bullets or Ballots (1936)
- The Green Pastures (1936)
- God's Country and the Woman (1936)
- The Prince and the Pauper (1937)
- Varsity Show (1937)
- The Adventures of Robin Hood (1938) (co-director)
- Valley of the Giants (1938)
- Secrets of an Actress (1938)
- Brother Rat (1938)
- Yes, My Darling Daughter (1939)
- Each Dawn I Die (1939)
- The Fighting 69th (1940)
- Torrid Zone (1940)
- No Time for Comedy (1940)
- Four Mothers (1941)
- The Bride Came C.O.D. (1941)
- The Man Who Came to Dinner (1942)
- George Washington Slept Here (1942)
- Target for Today (1944 documentary) (uncredited)
- Honeymoon (1947)
- The Street with No Name (1948)
- Rocky Mountain (1950)
- Close to My Heart (1951)
- The Master of Ballantrae (1953)
