= Honeymoon for Three (1941 film) =

1941 film by Lloyd Bacon

- Theatrical release poster
- Directed by: Lloyd Bacon
- Written by: Earl Baldwin; Julius J. Epstein; Philip G. Epstein
- Based on: Goodbye Again; 1932 play by Allan Scott and George Haight
- Produced by: Hal B. Wallis; Henry Blanke
- Starring: Ann Sheridan; George Brent; Charlie Ruggles
- Cinematography: Ernest Haller
- Edited by: Rudi Fehr
- Music by: Heinz Roemheld
- Production company: Warner Bros. Pictures
- Distributed by: Warner Bros. Pictures
- Release date: January 18, 1941
- Running time: 75 minutes
- Country: United States
- Language: English

Honeymoon for Three is a 1941 American romantic comedy film directed by Lloyd Bacon and starring Ann Sheridan. George Brent, Charlie Ruggles and Osa Massen. Future star Jane Wyman appears in a supporting role. The film was produced and distributed by Warner Bros. Pictures. It is a remake of the 1933 film Goodbye Again, which was itself based on the 1932 play Goodbye Again.

== Plot ==
An author in love with his secretary gets into trouble when he encounters an infatuated fan while on tour in Cleveland.

== Cast ==
- Ann Sheridan as Anne Rogers
- George Brent as Kenneth Bixby
- Charlie Ruggles as Harvey Wilson
- Osa Massen as Julie Wilson
- Jane Wyman as Elizabeth Clochessy
- William T. Orr as Arthur Westlake
- Lee Patrick as Mrs. Pettijohn
- Walter Catlett as Waiter
- Herbert Anderson as Floyd Ingram
- Johnny Downs as Chester T. Farrington III

== Reception ==
Bosley Crowther gave a negative review in The New York Times: "When we take Mr. Brent as a Don Juan, the picture has got to be funnier than the main premise, for Mr. Brent, as is generally known, is somewhat remote from the type. And that funny, we regret to say, 'Honeymoon for Three' is not."

== Bibliography ==
- Goble, Alan. The Complete Index to Literary Sources in Film. Walter de Gruyter, 1999.
