= Special Agent (1935 film) =

1935 American drama film

- Theatrical release poster
- Directed by: William Keighley
- Written by: Laird Doyle; Abem Finke; Martin Mooney (story idea)
- Produced by: Samuel Bischoff (uncredited); Martin Mooney (uncredited)
- Starring: Bette Davis; George Brent; Ricardo Cortez
- Cinematography: Sidney Hickox
- Edited by: Clarence Kolster
- Music by: Bernhard Kaun
- Production company: Cosmopolitan Productions
- Distributed by: Warner Bros. Pictures; The Vitaphone Corporation
- Release date: September 14, 1935
- Running time: 76 minutes
- Country: United States
- Language: English

Special Agent is a 1935 American crime drama film directed by William Keighley and starring Bette Davis and George Brent. The screenplay by Laird Doyle and Abem Finkel is based on a story by Martin Mooney. The film was produced by Cosmopolitan Productions and released by Warner Bros. Pictures.

== Plot ==
The federal government seeks to imprison gangsters due to their financial crimes, tax evasion and violations of Internal Revenue Service regulations. Newspaper reporter Bill Bradford is deputized as a treasury agent by the Internal Revenue Bureau and assigned to find enough evidence to charge gangster Alexander Carston (who has the same initials as Al Capone) with tax evasion.

He learns that Carston's ledgers are kept in a code known only to his secretary, Julie Gardner, also his lover. When she witnesses the murder of Waxey Armitage, a man who double-crossed her boss,—along with other innocent civilians—Bill begs her to quit her job, but Julie realizes she knows too much for Carston to let her go, and worries that if she tries to quit, Carston will take her to the “castle”, his secret hideout where he tortures people who threaten him. She suggests eloping with Bill to escape, but he refuses.

District Attorney Roger Quinn pressures the murdered man's partner into testifying, but Carston learns of the plan and the witness is murdered and Carston is acquitted. After Bill reveals his secret mission to Julie, she worries his feelings are nothing but an attempt to get information from her, but he assures her that this is not the case. She is still unsure, but decides to help him and smuggles him Carston's ledgers. To keep her safe from Carston, she is then arrested as a material witness and decodes the books. She decides to testify in court but is kidnapped by Carston's henchmen before she can do so.

Bill tricks Carston into taking him where Julie is being held, and the police trail them. A shootout follows and Julie and Bill are rescued. Her testimony, along with a courtroom shootout, proves that Carston is guilty of tax evasion and murder, and sends Carston to Alcatraz for the next 30 years. After calling off of work, Bill successfully proposes to Julie, and they kiss.

== Cast ==
- Bette Davis as Julie Gardner
- George Brent as Bill Bradford
- Ricardo Cortez as Alexander Carston
- Jack La Rue as Jake Andrews (as Jack LaRue)
- Henry O'Neill as District Attorney Roger Quinn
- Robert Strange as Waxey Armitage
- Joseph Crehan as Commissioner of Police
- J. Carrol Naish as Joe Durell (as J. Carroll Naish)
- Joe Sawyer as Rich (as Joseph Sauers)
- William B. Davidson as Charlie Young (as William Davidson)
- Robert Barrat as Chief of Internal Revenue Service
- Paul Guilfoyle as Williams
- Joe King as Agent Wilson (as Joseph King)
- Irving Pichel as U.S. District Attorney
- Charles Middleton as State Police Commander

== Production notes ==
Special Agent was one of three 1935 films co-starring Bette Davis and George Brent, who appeared on-screen together a total of thirteen times. Neither was happy with the finished product. Brent told Ruth Waterbury of Photoplay that the picture was "a poor, paltry thing, unbelievable and unconvincing." At the behest of the Warner Bros. publicity department, his comments remained unpublished. The film, featuring a law enforcement officer triumphing over gangsters was released by Warners in the same year as G Men.

The film was made just after the Hays Office started to enforce the Production Code. They insisted on several minor changes and wanted a scene producer Sam Bischoff felt was crucial to the plot to be cut in its entirety. The censors compromised by allowing it to remain intact but without what they considered offensive dialogue. As a result, Ricardo Cortez' lips can be seen moving but nothing is heard on the soundtrack.

The Oscar-winning song "Lullaby of Broadway" by Harry Warren and Al Dubin is heard in the background in a scene set in a casino. The tune was introduced by Wini Shaw that same year in the musical film Gold Diggers of 1935, also a Warner Bros. release.

New York newspaperman Martin Mooney's story also served as the basis of the 1940 Warner Bros. release Gambling on the High Seas. Mooney provided the story for the following year's Bullets or Ballots and Exclusive Story as well as authoring the book Crime Incorporated (1935).

== Reception ==
The New York Times called the film a "crisp, fast moving and thoroughly entertaining melodrama" and "a wild and woolly gangland saga", adding, "It all has been done before, but somehow it never seems to lose its visual excitement."

== Radio adaptation ==
Special Agent was presented on Warner Brothers Academy Theater April 24, 1938. Carole Landis and John Ridgely starred in the 30-minute adaptation.
