= The Go Getter (1937 film) =

1937 film

- Directed by: Busby Berkeley
- Written by: Delmer Daves
- Based on: the short story "The Go-Getter" by Peter B. Kyne
- Produced by: Hal B. Wallis (uncredited)
- Starring: George Brent; Anita Louise; Charles Winninger
- Cinematography: Arthur Edeson (uncredited)
- Edited by: William Holmes
- Music by: Bernhard Kaun
- Production company: Cosmopolitan Productions
- Distributed by: Warner Bros. Pictures
- Release date: May 22, 1937
- Running time: 92 minutes
- Country: United States
- Language: English

The Go Getter is a 1937 American romantic drama film directed by Busby Berkeley and starring George Brent, Anita Louise, and Charles Winninger. A determined discharged US Navy veteran succeeds in the lumber business. The film was produced by Cosmopolitan Productions and released through Warner Bros. Pictures.

== Plot ==
When the US Navy rigid airship Macon is damaged in a storm and crashes into the water (as the real USS Macon did in 1935), helmsman Bill Austin stays with his commanding officer until the rest of the crew has gotten safely away. Bill loses a leg as a result of the crash and leaves the Navy.

He goes looking for employment, but jobs are scarce in San Francisco. He tries a lumber company run by Lloyd Skinner, interrupting a meeting between Skinner and his fiancée Margaret Ricks. Skinner orders him to leave his office. Matt Peasely, head of a shipping firm in the same building, is more polite, but the answer is still the same. Undeterred, Bill seeks out Cappy Ricks, the retired founder of both companies.

While waiting in the reception area, he encounters Margaret again. He assumes she is also a job seeker and makes a date with her, unaware she is Cappy's only offspring. She sees her father first, and asks him to give Bill a chance. Cappy, who is frustrated with the way Skinner and Peasely have been running the businesses he built up, is quite willing to countermand them. He and Skinner decide to give Bill the hardest task they can think of: selling a half million feet of unwanted skunk spruce Cappy bought years ago as a favor to a friend. Not only does Bill sell all of the spruce, he also generates orders for all of the lumber the company has and more, all in a single business trip across the western United States, forcing Cappy to send him to Seattle to buy the shortfall from a hard-negotiating competitor.

Meanwhile, Bill and Margaret fall in love. With his commission from his trip, he buys an engagement ring. When he tells Cappy of his plans, however, the widowed Cappy is adamantly opposed to losing Margaret's company. He and Skinner go ahead with the "blue vase" test, a test everybody has failed, including Skinner. Cappy telephones Bill and tells him he saw a vase he liked, but could not spare the time to purchase it. He gives Bill instructions to buy it whatever the cost and bring it to him at the railway station by eight o'clock. Cappy and Skinner have pre-arranged all sorts of obstacles to make the task impossible, but Bill overcomes them all, and by hocking Margaret's ring to help pay the $1000 price of the vase and persuading a Navy pilot friend (on his honeymoon night, no less) to fly him ahead of the already departed train, he succeeds. Cappy is so impressed, he offers Bill a promotion to manager of his Shanghai office.

When Bill insists on marrying Margaret immediately so she can accompany him, Cappy does his best to stop him. He buys up all the staterooms in the ship Bill is to take, but Bill and Margaret get married and manage to sneak aboard the ship anyway. Then Cappy receives word that his men have gone on strike, and they trust and will only negotiate with Bill. Cappy sends him an urgent radiogram. When the captain of the ship refuses Bill's request to turn around, Bill jumps overboard. Margaret follows him, and the captain drops a lifeboat. Cappy finds them rowing back to land.

Bill negotiates an end to the strike, and Cappy decides to send Skinner to Shanghai instead. For Cappy's sake, the couple agree to live in his mansion.

== Cast ==
- George Brent as Bill Austin
- Anita Louise as Margaret Ricks
- Charles Winninger as Cappy Ricks
- John Eldredge as Lloyd Skinner
- Henry O'Neill as Commander Tisdale
- Joseph Crehan as Karl Stone
- Gordon Oliver as Luce
- Eddie Acuff as Bob Blair
- Willard Robertson as Matt Peasely
- Pierre Watkin as Browne
- Joan Valerie as Skinner's Secretary (as Helen Valkis)
- Herbert Rawlinson as Lester
- George Chandler as Business Card Printer
- Helen Lowell as Mrs. Luce
- Harry Beresford as M. M. Barker
- Minerva Urecal as Cappy Ricks' Secretary
- Mary Treen as Mrs. Blair

== Reception ==
Ann Ross wrote in a short review in Maclean's magazine that "Charles Winninger’s energetic performance as Cappy keeps things moving".
