= Secrets of an Actress =

1938 film by William Keighley

- Directed by: William Keighley
- Written by: Julius J. Epstein; Milton Krims; Rowland Leigh; Charles Kenyon (uncredited); Mary C. McCall, Jr. (uncredited)
- Produced by: David Lewis (uncredited)
- Starring: Kay Francis; George Brent; Ian Hunter
- Cinematography: Sidney Hickox
- Edited by: Owen Marks
- Music by: Heinz Roemheld
- Production company: Warner Bros. Pictures
- Distributed by: Warner Bros. Pictures
- Release date: October 7, 1938
- Running time: 70-71 minutes
- Country: United States
- Language: English

Secrets of an Actress is a romantic drama film directed by William Keighley, and starring Kay Francis, George Brent, and Ian Hunter in 1938. It is about a love triangle between a stage actress, her financial backer, and his friend.

== Plot summary ==
Architects Dick Orr and Peter Snowden fall in love with actress Fay Carter and get involved in her show business aspirations.

== Cast ==
- Kay Francis as Fay Carter
- George Brent as Dick Orr
- Ian Hunter as Peter Snowden
- Gloria Dickson as Carla Orr
- Isabel Jeans as Marian Plantagenet
- Penny Singleton as Miss Reid
- Dennie Moore as Miss Blackstone
- Selmer Jackson as Mr. Thompson
- Herbert Rawlinson as Mr. Harrison
- Emmett Vogan as Joe Spencer (as Emmet Vogan)
- James B. Carson as Carstairs
- George O'Hanlon as Flowers Delivery Boy (uncredited)

== Production ==
Producer David Lewis was assigned to make the film which was a cheap vehicle for Kay Francis. Lewis wrote Warner Bros "had completely lost faith in her and wanted to get out of the contract as cheaply as possible.... She was on the shit list, particularly [Hal B.] Wallis’, so the budget was frugal, including wardrobe, and remember Kay wearing mainly her own clothes... Kay couldn’t have cared less; she wanted her money and was prepared to do anything to get it."

The original script written by Rowland Leigh was a remake of an old Warner Bros film. Milton Krims worked on it and then the Epstein twins were bought in.

According to Lewis, Francis "was always pleasant, but I often suspected she was lifting a bottle during production. The Picture came off smoothly, mainly because of [director William] Keighley, and the result was bland but acceptable, probably the best of Kay’s final pictures."

== Notes ==
- Lewis, David (1993). Curtis, James (ed.). The Creative Producer. Metuchen: Scarecrow Press. ISBN 0-8108-2720-4.
