= Wings of the Navy =

1939 film by Lloyd Bacon

- Theatrical poster
- Directed by: Lloyd Bacon
- Written by: Michael Fessier
- Produced by: Louis F. Edelman
- Starring: George Brent; Olivia de Havilland; John Payne
- Cinematography: Arthur Edeson
- Edited by: George Amy
- Music by: Heinz Roemheld
- Distributed by: Warner Bros. Pictures
- Release date: February 11, 1939
- Running time: 89 minutes
- Country: United States
- Language: English

Wings of the Navy is a 1939 American drama film directed by Lloyd Bacon and starring George Brent, Olivia de Havilland and John Payne. Like many of the Warner Bros. features in the pre-World War II era, it was intended to serve as propaganda for the U.S. military and received heavy support from the U.S. Navy, which also considered the film as a recruiting tool.

== Plot ==
Submarine officer Jerry Harrington (John Payne) goes to Pensacola to train as a flying cadet, just like his legendary father and illustrious brother, longtime airman Cass Harrington (George Brent). Jerry ends up falling for his brother's girlfriend, Irene Dale (Olivia de Havilland), which only increases the competition between the two brothers. After Cass is seriously injured in a crash, he is forced to leave the Navy. Jerry becomes a pilot in San Diego and begins flying seaplanes while Cass designs a new fighter for the Navy. Jerry wants to prove to Cass that he is a better pilot, even if it means leaving the Navy to test the experimental fighter which has already led to the death of a test pilot. Irene is forced to choose which man she loves.

== Cast ==
- George Brent as Cass Harrington
- Olivia de Havilland as Irene Dale
- John Payne as Jerry Harrington
- Frank McHugh as Scat Allen
- John Litel as Commander Clark
- Victor Jory as Lt. Parsons
- Henry O'Neill as Prologue Speaker
- John Ridgely as Dan Morrison
- John Gallaudet as Lt. Harry White
- Donald Briggs as Instructor
- Edgar Edwards as Ted Parsons
- Regis Toomey as First Flight Instructor
- Alberto Morin as Armando Costa (as Albert Morin)
- Jonathan Hale as Commandant
- Pierre Watkin as Capt. March

== Production ==
Wings of the Navy was filmed on location at the Naval Air Station on North Island in San Diego, California, and the Naval Air Station at Pensacola, Florida, and was dedicated to the U.S. Naval Aviation Service. The actors and production crew, numbering 70, arrived in Pensacola in the first week of July 1938, and moved to San Diego after the Florida filming was complete. The US Navy was heavily committed by providing access to aircraft and facilities with Lieutenant Commander Hugh Sease serving as the Technical Advisor to the production. Several of the latest US Navy types were on display including the Grumman F3F biplane fighter which played the role of an experimental fighter known as the XFAA-1, and an early variant of the Consolidated PBY Catalina. Warner Brothers built a detailed mock-up of a Catalina cabin for interior flight shots.

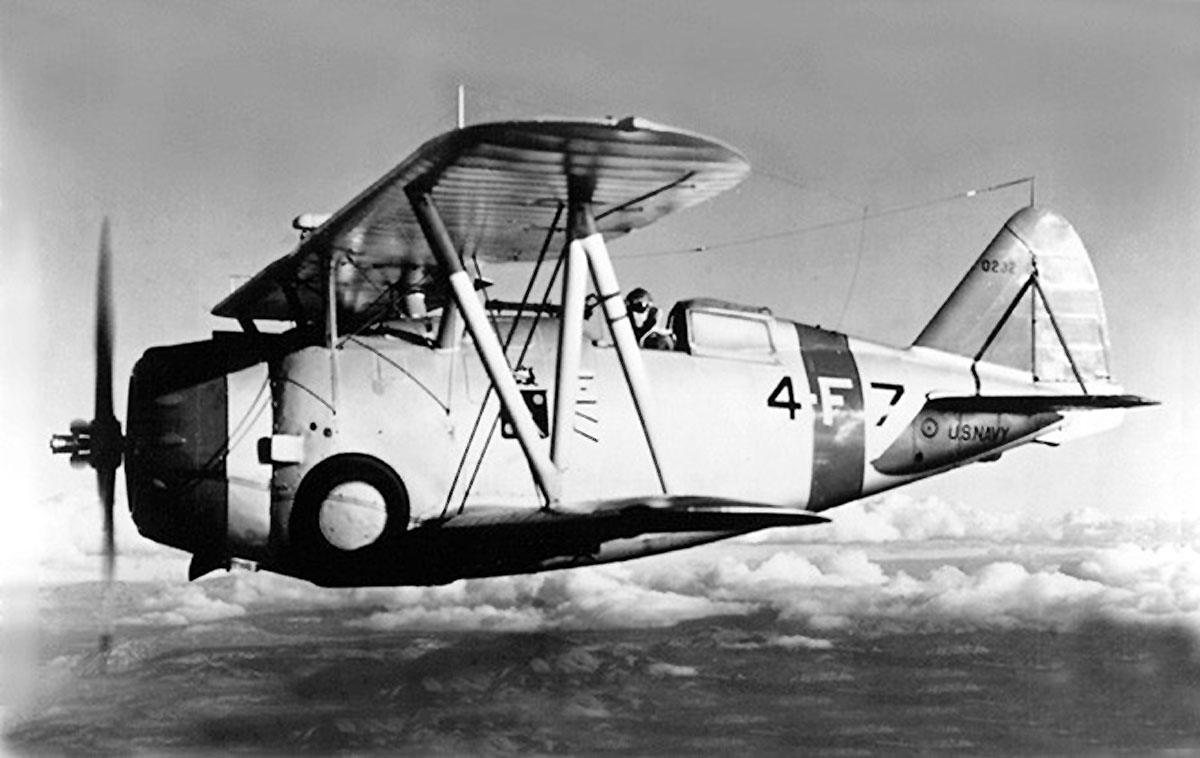
Grumman F3F fighter, c. 1930s

== Reception ==
Typical of other period Warner Bros. dramas, it was a propaganda when it was released early in 1939, before World War II had begun.

The most impressive aspect of the film was the flying sequences which a reviewer at The New York Times aptly reported was "As a documentary study of the Pensacola Naval Air Training station, and its methods of turning raw recruits into seasoned pilots of combat and bombing planes, "Wings of the Navy" gets off the ground very nimbly, and has a good deal of value, interest and even excitement, of the purely mechanical sort, to offer to the curious."

== Radio adaptation ==
Wings of the Navy was presented in a one-hour dramatization on Lux Radio Theatre October 7, 1940. Brent, DeHavilland and Payne reprised their roles from the film.
