= Housewife (film) =

1934 film by Alfred E. Green

- Theatrical release poster
- Directed by: Alfred E. Green
- Written by: Lillie Hayward; Robert Lord
- Screenplay by: Manuel Seff; Lillie Hayward
- Produced by: Jack L. Warner
- Starring: George Brent; Bette Davis; Ann Dvorak
- Cinematography: William Rees
- Edited by: James Gibbon
- Music by: Heinz Roemheld
- Distributed by: Warner Bros. Pictures
- Release date: August 11, 1934
- Running time: 69 minutes
- Country: United States
- Language: English

Housewife is a 1934 American drama film directed by Alfred E. Green, and starring George Brent, Bette Davis, and Ann Dvorak. The screenplay by Manuel Seff and Lillie Hayward is based on a story by Hayward and Robert Lord.

A print is held at the Library of Congress.

== Plot ==
Nan Reynolds struggles to run the household on her meek husband Bill's meager salary as an office manager. She urges him to apply for better jobs elsewhere, but he is disinclined to take risks, and his lack of ambition is placing a strain on their marriage.

Pat Berkeley, who attended high school with Nan and Bill, is hired by his firm as an advertising copywriter, and her success prompts Nan to coerce her husband into asserting himself with his boss. When he fails to spark any interest with his ideas, Bill succumbs to his wife's suggestion that he start his own agency using the money she has managed to save. Spurred by Nan, he steals a major client from his former firm and hires Pat to help him handle it. Complications arise when the feelings the two had for each other years before are reignited and they embark upon an affair. Nan becomes aware of their relationship but chooses to ignore it.

Bill announces he wants a divorce. When Nan refuses to grant him one, he angrily leaves the house and accidentally hits their son Buddy with the car, seriously injuring him. Months pass, Buddy recovers, and Bill and Nan's divorce is in its final stages. Hearing Nan's court testimony, Bill realizes how good she is as a wife and mother and how much he loves and needs her, and the two decide to reconcile.

== Cast ==
- George Brent as William Reynolds
- Bette Davis as Patricia Berkeley
- Ann Dvorak as Nan Reynolds
- John Halliday as Paul Duprey
- Ruth Donnelly as Dora Wilson
- Hobart Cavanaugh as George Wilson
- Robert Barrat as Sam Blake
- Joseph Cawthorn as Krueger (as Joe Cawthorne)
- Phil Regan as Radio Singer
- Willard Robertson as Judge
- Ronnie Cosby as Buddy Reynolds

== Critical reception ==
Frank S. Nugent of The New York Times observed, "A characteristic of a poor boxer is that he telegraphs his punches. In Housewife . . . the dramatic punches are not merely telegraphed, but radioed. About the most unexpected element of the film is the bewildering regularity with which the unexpected fails to happen . . . Mr. Brent and Miss Dvorak do as well as any one might expect, but Miss Davis is a trifle too obvious as the siren."

Although Variety called it "satisfactory entertainment," when asked about the film in later years, Bette Davis responded, "Dear God! What a horror!"
