= Lilly Turner =

- Directed by: William A. Wellman
- Screenplay by: Gene Markey; Kathryn Scola
- Based on: Lilly Turner by Phillip Dunning and George Abbott
- Produced by: Hal B. Wallis (uncredited)
- Starring: Ruth Chatterton; George Brent; Frank McHugh
- Cinematography: James Van Trees
- Production company: First National Pictures
- Distributed by: First National Pictures; Vitaphone Corporation
- Release date: May 13, 1933
- Running time: 65 minutes
- Country: United States

Lilly Turner is a 1933 American pre-Code drama film directed by William A. Wellman, and starring Ruth Chatterton, George Brent, and Frank McHugh. The film follows the title character, a downtrodden carnival sideshow performer who is abandoned by her bigamist husband and faced with a series of subsequent tragedies and romances. It is based on the 1932 play of the same name by Phillip Dunning and George Abbott.

The film was produced by First National Pictures and distributed under their banner in May 1933, despite the studio having been formally absorbed by Warner Bros. at that point. After its initial release, Warner Bros. attempted to reissue the film in 1936, but the Production Code Office denied them a certificate.

== Plot ==
Naive carnival sideshow performer Lilly Turner marries the flamboyant Rex Durkee, a magician she meets while working in Buffalo, New York. Shortly into the marriage, Lilly becomes disillusioned with Rex, who misleads her into believing the couple are going to start a new life in New York City. Instead, Rex takes Lilly along with him to a number of cities where he continues his sideshow act, claiming that his prospects in New York City's vaudeville circuit are low. Later, another woman claims Rex to be her husband, and charges him with bigamy.

Rex abandons a pregnant Lilly, who continues working in carnival sideshows. Lilly's friend and co-worker Dave Dixon marries Lilly so that her child can take his name, but Lilly suffers a miscarriage. Lilly and Dave continue performing in cheap sideshows together, finding consistent employment with a traveling medicine show. Dave descends into alcoholism, driving the jaded Lilly to seek other lovers while she is pursued by her male peers in the sideshow circuit.

Bob Chandler, an educated engineer temporarily driving taxis to make ends meet, sees Lilly performing in the sideshow and becomes smitten with her. The same night, the show's strongman, Fritz, who is obsessed with Lilly, suffers a psychotic episode that renders him unable to perform. Lilly suggests that Bob take his place, to which he agrees. The two begin a romance, and Lilly confesses to Bob that, despite Dave's protectiveness of her, the couple have remained platonic.

While staying a hotel, Bob receives a telegram notifying him he has been offered a civil engineering job in Mexico City. He asks Lilly to leave with him on a train scheduled for that evening. Though initially hesitant, she agrees. Meanwhile, the institutionalized Fritz breaks out of the psychiatric hospital and accosts Lilly at the hotel. Dave and Bob intercept, but Dave is thrown from a second story window, causing a spinal fracture that requires him to be hospitalized. Dave begs Lilly to stay, and, despite her romance with Bob, she chooses to remain loyal to him. Bob understands Lilly's decision, but promises to always love her.

== Cast ==
- Ruth Chatterton as Lilly Turner
- George Brent as Bob Chandler
- Frank McHugh as Dave Dixon
- Guy Kibbee as Doc Peter McGill
- Robert Barrat as Fritz
- Ruth Donnelly as Edna Yokum
- Marjorie Gateson as Mrs. McGill
- Gordon Westcott as Rex Durkee
- Arthur Vinton as Sam Waxman
- Grant Mitchell as Dr. Hawley
- Margaret Seddon as Mrs. Turner
- Mayo Methot as Mrs. Durkee
- Mae Busch as Hazel

== Production ==
=== Development ===
Development of Lilly Turner began in January 1933, shortly after the stage play of the same name by Phillip Dunning and George Abbott premiered. Ruth Chatterton's casting was announced that month. Chatterton and her co-star, George Brent, were married at the time of making the film.

=== Filming ===
Principal photography began on January 31, 1933, in California. In February 1933, filming was temporarily halted on location in Lake Arrowhead due to a snowstorm.

=== Post-production ===
Post-production and editing of Lilly Turner was completed by late April 1933. Walter Brennan appeared in an early cut of the film, but his scenes were ultimately excised from the final cut.

== Release ==
First National Pictures released Lilly Turner in the United States on May 13, 1933. In 1936, Warner Bros., who had absorbed First National Pictures, submitted a request to reissue the film, but were denied by Joseph Breen, who refused to give the film a Code certificate.

=== Home media ===
The Warner Archive Collection released Lilly Turner on Blu-ray on July 28, 2026.

== Reception ==
Lilly Turner received mixed reviews upon its initial release. A critic of the Modern Screen stated: "The entire cast, including Guy Kibbee, is very good, especially Frank McHugh, but the story is sordid and quite dull." Variety wrote: "Picture is Miss Chatterton's all the way, star making every effort to give what the story lacks and what is missing in the direction." The Movie Mirror stated: "It's sordid and weak. You'll wish they'd given Chatterton something better." The San Antonio Express-News praised Wellman's direction, and noted the film as superior to Chatterton's previous feature, Frisco Jenny, stating that it "transcends in power and dramatic appeal."

A review published by Time magazine described Chatterton as being miscast in the lead role: "Ruth Chatterton’s main fault as an actress is that, however deplorable her circumstances may be, she remains a lady. Thus the most spurious moment in this picture is the one which shows Lilly Turner hunched drunkenly on the front seat of the medicine show truck which her lover is driving, guzzling whiskey out of a pint bottle and confessing, with improbably heroic hiccoughs, that she has a past."

Film writer James Travers notes: "The smallness of the budget and the absurdities of the plot are to a large extent masked by the generally excellent performances and the oppressive mood that Wellman and his cinematographer James Van Trees manage to create... A thick air of fatalism hangs over this film." Pre-code film historian Danny Reid describes the film as a "down-and-dirty character piece, filled to the brim with atmosphere and a wry smile on its face."

== Sources ==
- Meuel, David (2025). Assembly-Line Auteur: The Pre-Code Films of William Wellman. Jefferson, North Carolina: McFarland & Company. ISBN 978-1-476-69630-0.
