= Living on Velvet =

1935 film

- theatrical release poster
- Directed by: Frank Borzage
- Written by: Story & screenplay: Jerry Wald; Julius J. Epstein; Edward Chorodov (uncredited)
- Produced by: Frank Borzage
- Starring: Kay Francis; Warren William; George Brent
- Cinematography: Sidney Hickox
- Edited by: William Holmes
- Music by: Heinz Roemheld
- Production company: Warner Bros. Pictures
- Distributed by: Warner Bros. Pictures
- Release date: March 2, 1935
- Running time: 75 minutes
- Country: United States
- Language: English

Living on Velvet is a 1935 American romantic drama film directed by Frank Borzage and starring Kay Francis, Warren William and George Brent.

== Plot ==
One day, Terry Parker, an airplane pilot, is in a plane crash that kills his family. He feels guilty for their death and feels like he should have died in the crash as well. Terry continues to get into trouble until his friend, Walter Pritcham, known as Gibraltar for his steady nature, brings him to a party. Terry meets the beautiful Amy Prentiss and they both fall in love.

Terry realizes that Amy is Gibraltar's girl and tries to leave Amy, but Gibraltar reunites the couple wanting Amy to be happy. Amy and Terry get married and Gibraltar gives them a house in the country on Long Island. Terry is unemployed for some time until he gets the idea to fly commuters into New York.

However, Amy believes that Terry will not act responsibly and leaves him. Gibraltar tries to get Amy to go back to Terry, but she refuses. Terry is in a car crash and Amy and Gibraltar rush to see him. Terry and Amy realize that they do love each other and vow never to leave each other ever again.

== Cast ==
- Kay Francis as Amy Prentiss Parker
- Warren William as Walter 'Gibraltar' Pritcham
- George Brent as Terrence Clarence 'Terry' Parker
- Helen Lowell as Aunt Martha Prentiss
- Henry O'Neill as Harold Thornton
- Russell Hicks as Major at Flying Field
- Maude Turner Gordon as Mrs. Parker
- Samuel S. Hinds as Henry L. Parker
- Martha Merrill as Cynthia Parker
- Edgar Kennedy as Counterman
- Lee Shumway as Army Officer (uncredited)
- Eric Wilton as Butler (uncredited)

== Reception ==
The New York Times review by Frank S. Nugent on March 8, 1935, praised the opening of the film, but said the conclusion was confusing: "With all the advantage of a rather neat plot situation, some brittle dialogue and the presence of the amiable George Brent and the attractive Kay Francis, Living on Velvet dwindles off to an unconvincing and rather meaningless ending, which does its best, in one stroke, to destroy most of the interest which the picture had succeeded in arousing during the earlier scenes. ... It is not the fault of the cast that the picture does not merit unqualified praise."
