= Give Me Your Heart (film) =

1936 film by Archie Mayo

- Theatrical release poster
- Directed by: Archie Mayo
- Screenplay by: Casey Robinson
- Based on: Sweet Aloes; 1934 play by Jay Mallory
- Produced by: Robert Lord; Hal B. Wallis
- Starring: Kay Francis; George Brent; Roland Young; Patric Knowles
- Cinematography: Sidney Hickox
- Edited by: James Gibbon
- Music by: Heinz Roemheld
- Production company: Warner Bros. Pictures
- Distributed by: Warner Bros. Pictures
- Release date: September 17, 1936
- Running time: 98 minutes
- Country: United States
- Language: English

Give Me Your Heart is a 1936 American drama film directed by Archie Mayo and starring Kay Francis, George Brent and Roland Young. It is a melodrama based on the 1934 London play Sweet Aloes, by Joyce Carey. Leading lady Kay Francis, playing the familiar role of a self-sacrificing mother, had a difficult working relationship with the director throughout the making of the film.

== Plot ==
A young Englishwoman has a relationship with a married man.

== Cast ==
- Kay Francis as Belinda Warren
- George Brent as Jim Baker
- Roland Young as Tubbs Barrow
- Patric Knowles as Robert Melford
- Henry Stephenson as Edward - Lord Farrington
- Frieda Inescort as Rosamond Melford
- Helen Flint as Dr. Florence Cudahy
- Halliwell Hobbes as Oliver
- Zeffie Tilbury as Esther Warren
- Elspeth Dudgeon as Alice Dodd
