= The Goose and the Gander =

1935 film by Alfred E. Green

- Directed by: Alfred E. Green
- Written by: Charles Kenyon
- Story by: Charles Kenyon
- Produced by: James Seymour (uncredited)
- Starring: Kay Francis; George Brent; Genevieve Tobin
- Cinematography: Sidney Hickox
- Edited by: Bert L'Orle
- Music by: Heinz Roemheld
- Production company: Warner Bros. Pictures
- Distributed by: Warner Bros. Pictures; The Vitaphone Corporation
- Release date: September 21, 1935
- Running time: 65 minutes
- Country: United States
- Language: English

The Goose and the Gander is a 1935 American romantic comedy film directed by Alfred E. Green and starring Kay Francis, George Brent and Genevieve Tobin.

== Plot ==
A woman finds out her ex-husband's new wife is cheating on him and decides to expose her.

== Cast ==
- Kay Francis as Georgiana
- George Brent as Bob McNear
- Genevieve Tobin as Betty
- John Eldredge as Lawrence
- Claire Dodd as Connie
- Ralph Forbes as Ralph Summers
- Helen Lowell as Aunt Julia
- Spencer Charters as Winkelsteinberger
- William Austin as Arthur Summers
- Eddie Shubert as Sweeney
- Charles Coleman as Jones
- Olive Jones as Miriam Brent
- Bill Elliott as Teddy (credited as Gordon Elliott)
- John Sheehan as Murphy
- Wade Boteler as Sprague
