= They Call It Sin =

1932 film

- Film poster
- Directed by: Thornton Freeland
- Screenplay by: Lillie Hayward; Howard J. Green
- Based on: They Call It Sin; 1932 novel by Alberta Stedman Eagan
- Produced by: Hal B. Wallis (uncredited)
- Starring: Loretta Young; George Brent
- Cinematography: James Van Trees
- Edited by: James Gibbon
- Music by: Songs: Johnny Green (music); Jay Gorney (music); Yip Harburg (lyrics)
- Production company: First National Pictures
- Distributed by: First National Pictures
- Release date: November 5, 1932
- Running time: 68-75 minutes
- Country: United States
- Language: English

They Call It Sin is a 1932 American pre-Code drama film directed by Thornton Freeland and starring Loretta Young as a farmer's daughter who follows a traveling salesman to New York City, only to discover he already is engaged.

== Plot ==
Small-town church organist Marion Cullen falls in love with traveling salesman Jimmy Decker. When she learns that the couple who raised her are not really her parents, and that she is actually the illegitimate daughter of a showgirl, she sets out for New York City in search of Jimmy. However, she discovers that he is engaged to Enid Hollister, his boss' daughter. Dr. Travers, who is in love with Marion, offers to help her, but she decides to try to make it on her own.

Jobs are scarce, however. She ends up with other hopeful showgirls, among them Dixie Dare, hoping to audition for a part in Ford Humphries' new production. The philandering Humphries likes what he sees in Marion and hires her as a piano accompanist. Dixie gets a job as well, and she and Marion become friends and roommates.

Travers sees Humphries and Marion together, and knowing the former's reputation, brings Jimmy to Humphries' party. Jimmy tells Marion that he loves her, but she refuses to break up his marriage. When she also refuses Humphries' advances, he fires her. He then decides to use one of the songs she had composed for his production, claiming he wrote it. When she learns of this, she confronts him, although he denies everything. Jimmy goes to Humphries' suite to convince him to do the right thing. During their argument, Humphries stumbles and falls onto the balcony below and lapses into a coma from his injuries. Jimmy flees the scene; however, the police have a description of him and suspect him of attempted murder. To shield Jimmy, Marion confesses to the non-existent crime. Desperate, Travers operates for hours on Humphries, who regains consciousness and explains what really happened in front of witnesses before dying. Marion is released and becomes engaged to Travers, as Jimmy wishes them well.

== Cast ==
- Loretta Young as Marion Cullen
- George Brent as Dr. Travers
- Una Merkel as Dixie Dare
- David Manners as Jimmy Decker
- Helen Vinson as Enid Hollister
- Louis Calhern as Ford Humphries
- Dennis Morgan as Gregory Russell (credited as Jack Morner)
- Joseph Cawthorn as Mr. Hollister (credited as Joe Cawthorne)
- Nella Walker as Mrs. Hollister
- Elizabeth Patterson as Mrs. Cullen
- Erville Alderson as Mr. Cullen
- Roscoe Karns as Brandt (uncredited)

== Reception ==
Mordaunt Hall, reviewer for The New York Times, dismissed it as an "unimportant offering ... weighted down with more or less stereotyped sensational episodes, none of which adds one iota of lifelike quality to the production", although the "back-stage episodes are produced neatly and with a praiseworthy degree of imagination in the direction." He did, however, praise several of the principal actors: "Miss Young is charming as Marion, but she has to share the acting laurels with Miss Merkel, who makes the most of her every line...George Brent does quite well as Tony."
