= Hard to Handle (film) =

1933 film

- Theatrical release poster
- Directed by: Mervyn LeRoy
- Written by: Robert Lord; Wilson Mizner; Houston Branch (original story)
- Starring: James Cagney
- Cinematography: Barney McGill
- Edited by: William Holmes
- Music by: Cliff Hess (uncredited)
- Production company: Warner Bros. Pictures
- Distributed by: Warner Bros. Pictures
- Release date: January 28, 1933
- Running time: 78 minutes
- Country: United States
- Language: English

Hard to Handle is a 1933 American pre-Code comedy film starring James Cagney as a breezily clowning con artist who organizes a Depression-era dance marathon. His character remarks at one point, "The public is like a cow, bellowing—bellowing!—to be milked". The movie was produced at Warner Bros. Pictures and directed by Mervyn LeRoy.

== Cast ==
- James Cagney as Myron C. 'Lefty' Merrill
- Mary Brian as Ruth Waters
- Allen Jenkins as Marathon radio announcer
- Ruth Donnelly as Lil Waters
- Claire Dodd as Marlene Reeves
- Robert McWade as Charles G. Reeves
- Berton Churchill as Col. H.D.X. Wells
- Emma Dunn as Mrs. Hawks
- Gavin Gordon as John Hayden
- Sterling Holloway as Andy Heaney
- William H. Strauss as Mr. Abe Goldstein
- Bess Flowers as Merrill's Secretary
