= The Right to Live (1935 film) =

1935 film by William Keighley

- Directed by: William Keighley
- Screenplay by: Ralph Block
- Based on: The Sacred Flame; 1928 play by Somerset Maugham
- Produced by: Robert Fellows
- Starring: Josephine Hutchinson; George Brent; Colin Clive; Peggy Wood; Henrietta Crosman; C. Aubrey Smith
- Cinematography: Sidney Hickox
- Edited by: Jack Killifer
- Music by: Bernhard Kaun
- Production company: Warner Bros. Pictures
- Distributed by: Warner Bros. Pictures
- Release date: January 26, 1935
- Running time: 69 minutes
- Country: United States
- Language: English

The Right to Live is a 1935 American drama film directed by William Keighley and starring Josephine Hutchinson, George Brent and Colin Clive. The film was shot at Warner Bros.'s Burbank Studios, with sets designed by the art director Esdras Hartley.

It is based on the 1928 play The Sacred Flame by Somerset Maugham, previously adapted into a film by the studio in 1929.

== Plot ==
Maurice Trent proposes marriage to Stella Trent after an evening at the opera. She accepts, but shortly after their wedding he is badly injured while flying a plane. He loses the uses of his legs, and becomes deeply concerned that he can no longer be a proper husband to Stella. He clings to the hope that he will recover his ability to walk. When his brother Colin arrives from the coffee plantation he owns in Brazil, Maurice enlists him to escort her around the nightlife of London in the way he no longer can. Over the months that follow Colin and Stella develop a passionate love for each other, despite Stella's guilt about her husband.

When he learns from his doctor that he will never be able to walk again, Maurice is devastated. The same night Stella has resolved to run away with Colin to Brazil, but after an emotional talk with her husband she knows she can never leave him. The next morning Maurice is found dead by his nurse Miss Wayland, who has long nurtured a secret love for him. Distressed and jealous of Stella whom she has always resented, she accuses her of murdering him with an overdose of sleeping pills. It is left to Maurice's mother to explain that he killed himself, realizing that he could never recover, to free Stella to live her life.

== Cast ==
- Josephine Hutchinson as Stella Trent
- George Brent as Colin Trent
- Colin Clive as Maurice
- Peggy Wood as Nurse Wayland
- Henrietta Crosman as Mrs. Trent
- C. Aubrey Smith as Major Licondra
- Leo G. Carroll as Dr. Harvester
- Phyllis Coghlan as Alice
- Claude King as Mr. Pride
- Nella Walker as Mrs. Pride
- Halliwell Hobbes as Sir Stephen Barr
- J. Gunnis Davis Harvey, the Gardener
