= Leo F. Forbstein =

American musical director and conductor (1892–1948)

- Born: October 16, 1892; Saint Louis, Missouri, US
- Died: March 16, 1948 (aged 55); Hollywood, California, US
- Occupation: Music Director
- Known for: film music
- Spouse: Bessie Gallas (m. 1914)
- Children: 1

Leo Frank Forbstein (October 16, 1892 – March 16, 1948) was an American film musical director and orchestra conductor who worked on more than 550 projects during a twenty-year period.

== Early years ==
Forbstein was born in St. Louis, Missouri. He was attracted to music as a child, learning the violin at the age of four. As a conductor at the Royal Theater in St. Joseph, he synchronized the orchestra with the action in silent films; he then became principal conductor at the Newman Theatre in Kansas City, where the organist was future Warner Bros. colleague Carl W. Stalling. In the mid-1920s, Forbstein relocated to Hollywood to head the symphony orchestra at Grauman's Egyptian Theatre.

== Joins Warner Bros. ==
He signed with Warner Bros. as one of the directors of its Vitaphone Orchestra, alongside Erno Rapee (then Warners' general music director), Louis Silvers, and David Mendoza; Forbstein's first screen credit was The Squall in 1929. In 1931, Warners dismissed Rapee and Mendoza in a consolidation and economy move and Forbstein became the company's general music director.

== Oscar nominations and win ==
Leo Forbstein conducts Dick Powell as Joan Blondell looks on in Broadway Gondolier (1935).

In 1936, musical director Forbstein and composer Erich Wolfgang Korngold were write-in candidates for the Academy Award for Best Scoring for their work on Captain Blood, a score composed by Korngold but for which Forbstein received recognition as head of the Warner Brothers music department under Academy rules in place at the time. The following year, Forbstein received nominations as head of the Warner Brothers music department for the nominated scores The Charge of the Light Brigade (composed by Max Steiner) and Anthony Adverse (composed by Korngold), winning for the latter. The award for Anthony Adverse was originally a plaque that was later replaced with an Academy Award statuette in 1946. He was nominated as head of the department again in 1938 for The Life of Emile Zola (composed by Steiner).

== Personal life ==
Forbstein was married to the former Bess Gallas from October 16, 1914 until his death from a heart attack in Los Angeles, California. They had one daughter, Harriett (born 1915). Composer Lou Forbes was Leo's younger brother. Leo Forbstein was entombed in the Corridor of Immortality at Home of Peace Cemetery.

== Selected film credits ==
- The Squall (1929)
- The Widow from Chicago (1930)
- The Maltese Falcon (1931)
- The Millionaire (1931)
- Bought! (1931)
- The Star Witness (1931)
- The Heart of New York (1932)
- Union Depot (1932)
- The Man Who Played God (1932)
- The Cabin in the Cotton (1932)
- I Am a Fugitive from a Chain Gang (1932)
- 42nd Street (1933)
- Gold Diggers of 1933 (1933)
- Footlight Parade (1933)
- The Working Man (1933)
- Ex-Lady (1933)
- Bureau of Missing Persons (1933)
- British Agent (1934)
- Fog Over Frisco (1934)
- The Big Shakedown (1934)
- Jimmy the Gent (1934)
- Fashions of 1934 (1934)
- Broadway Hostess (1935)
- Front Page Woman (1935)
- The Girl from 10th Avenue (1935)
- Special Agent (1935)
- Times Square Playboy (1936)
- The Golden Arrow (1936)
- It's Love I'm After (1937)
- Jezebel (1938)
- Dark Victory (1939)
- The Private Lives of Elizabeth and Essex (1939)
- The Letter (1940)
- Footsteps in the Dark (1941)
- Meet John Doe (1941)
- Sergeant York (1941)
- The Maltese Falcon (1941)
- Kings Row (1942)
- Yankee Doodle Dandy (1942)
- Now, Voyager (1942)
- Casablanca (1942)
- Destination Tokyo (1943)
- Janie (1944)
- Mr. Skeffington (1944)
- To Have and Have Not (1944)
- The Corn Is Green (1945)
- Mildred Pierce (1945)
- The Big Sleep (1946)
- The Treasure of the Sierra Madre (1948)
- Winter Meeting (1948)
- Rope (1948)
- Johnny Belinda (1948)
