= The Golden Arrow (1936 film) =

1936 film by Alfred E. Green

- Theatrical release poster
- Directed by: Alfred E. Green
- Screenplay by: Charles Kenyon
- Based on: The Golden Arrow; 1935 story in Liberty by Michael Arlen
- Produced by: Samuel Bischoff
- Starring: Bette Davis; George Brent
- Cinematography: Arthur Edeson
- Edited by: Thomas Pratt
- Music by: Heinz Roemheld
- Distributed by: Warner Bros. Pictures
- Release date: May 23, 1936
- Running time: 68 minutes
- Country: United States
- Language: English

The Golden Arrow (1936) is an American comedy film directed by Alfred E. Green and starring Bette Davis and George Brent. The screenplay by Charles Kenyon is based on a story of the same title by Michael Arlen published in the September 14, 1935, issue of Liberty.

== Plot ==
Johnny Jones is a penniless newspaper reporter assigned to interview Daisy Appleby, heiress to the Appleby Facial Creams fortune and the target of numerous titled but financially desperate suitors anxious to latch onto her wealth.

She proposes a marriage of convenience that will free her from the cads pursuing her so she can find her ideal man and allow Johnny leisure time to finish his novel. He agrees, and after they wed the company's board of directors try to place him under their control, as well. He finally learns that Daisy is really a cafeteria cashier hired by a public relations team to impersonate a socialite. When Johnny rebels and begins dating oil heiress Hortense Burke-Meyers in retaliation, Daisy, who realizes she truly loves him, tries to win him back by having her brother-in-law Alfred Parker impersonate an old beau in an effort to make Johnny jealous. At first it backfires, but things pivot on a chance event and the two make up and opt for love and poverty together.

== Cast ==
- Bette Davis as Daisy Appleby
- George Brent as Johnny Jones
- Eugene Pallette as Mr. Meyers
- Dick Foran as Tommy Blake
- Craig Reynolds as Jorgenson
- Carol Hughes as Hortense Burke-Meyers
- Hobart Cavanaugh as DeWolfe
- Earle Foxe as Alfred Parker

== Production ==
Although audience reaction to the film, originally titled Cream Princess, at a preview in Long Beach, California, was dismal, Warner Bros. Pictures rushed it into release to capitalize on leading lady Bette Davis' Academy Award-fanned fame for 1935's Dangerous.

The actress was upset with the publicity for the film, which she thought was ridiculous, and included mention of her Oscar win. "This film was the beginning of the end, temporarily, of my contract with Warner Bros.," she later recalled. "I was actually insulted to have to appear in such a cheap, nothing story as The Golden Arrow after Of Human Bondage, The Petrified Forest, and Bordertown."

== Critical reception ==
In his review in The New York Times, Frank S. Nugent observed, "With this and that device, with a deal of patterned dialogue and the transparent air of a man who recognizes the unimportance of what he has to say and yet prides himself on telling it so well that you will not mind, The Golden Arrow drifts rather pleasantly across the screen. It derives most of its slight strength as entertainment from the saucy performance of Miss Davis and the harried, but good-natured, expression of Mr. Brent."

Time described the film as "a minor comedy" and added "Although Miss Davis still can make her eyes pop and her lips droop, The Golden Arrow proves nothing more than that she is adept at nonchalance."
