= Rolfe Sedan =

American actor (1896–1982)

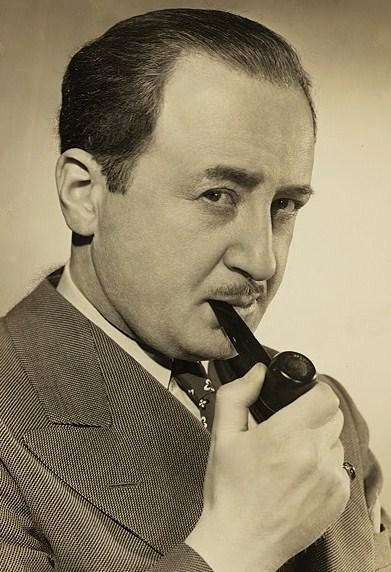
- Sedan c. late 1940s
- Born: Edward Sedan; January 20, 1896; New York City, U.S.
- Died: September 15, 1982 (aged 86); Pacific Palisades, California, U.S.
- Occupation: Actor
- Years active: 1916–1979
- Spouse: Beulah Lucille Fox
- Children: 1

Rolfe Sedan (born Edward Sedan; January 20, 1896 – September 15, 1982) was an American character actor, best known for appearing in bit parts, often uncredited, usually portraying clerks, train conductors, postmen, cooks, waiters, etc.

== Early life ==
Born Edward Sedan in New York City, his mother was a Broadway theatre fashion designer and his father an orchestra conductor.

== Career ==
Sedan began his career in show business as a vaudeville and nightclub performer and began acting in East Coast theatre. Sedan debuted on Broadway in 1916 and appeared in his first motion picture for Metro Pictures Corporation in 1921. In 1922 and 1923, Sedan was a featured actor with the Leith-Marsh Players in El Paso, Texas.

Sedan became a prolific character actor in films and is probably best remembered by movie buffs as the hotel manager in Ninotchka (1939) starring Greta Garbo; he made an uncredited appearance in the musical remake of Ninotchka, Silk Stockings (1957) and appeared in small, uncredited roles in several other Garbo films, including Flesh and the Devil (1926) and Grand Hotel (1932). Sedan appeared in another uncredited role as the Emerald City's Balloon Ascensionist in The Wizard of Oz (1939). He made uncredited appearances in bit parts in several films starring The Marx Brothers, with somewhat larger parts in Monkey Business (1931) and A Night at the Opera (1935).

Sedan returned to Broadway, performing in several different shows during the first half of the 1940s and in the 1950s began a sequence of guest roles in television series such as I Love Lucy, where he played the chef at a Parisian restaurant in "Paris at Last" (episode 145), The Jack Benny Program, and The Tab Hunter Show. Sedan's most frequent TV work came from recurring roles as hapless mail carriers (25 episodes as Mr. Beasley on The George Burns and Gracie Allen Show; four episodes as Mr. Briggs on The Addams Family). He was also seen as the train conductor in the film Young Frankenstein (1974), and in bit parts in two other Gene Wilder pictures. Rolfe Sedan remained active throughout a career that spanned more than six decades.

Sedan struggled to be accepted as an actor in radio, gaining his first role after six months of unsuccessful auditions, even though by then he had acted in films for 22 years. His initial broadcasting role came in an episode of Big Town when his voice best suited a specific part in the program. He went on to act in radio dramas that included The Adventures of Ellery Queen, Grand Central Station, Lux Radio Theatre, The March of Time, The Screen Guild Theater, and Silver Theater.

== Death ==
Sedan died in 1982 in Pacific Palisades, California, from heart problems at age 86.

== Selected filmography ==
- The Conquering Power (1921) - Annette's Suitor (uncredited)
- What No Man Knows (1921) - Lawyer (uncredited)
- Merry-Go-Round (1923) - Minor Role (uncredited)
- Sporting Youth (1924) - Valet
- Poisoned Paradise: The Forbidden Story of Monte Carlo (1924) - Onlooker at Roulette Table (uncredited)
- Excitement (1924) - Willie Winkle
- The Breaking Point (1924) - Theatre Audience Spectator (uncredited)
- The Dangerous Blonde (1924) - Henry
- Young Ideas (1924) - Bertie Loomis
- Love and Glory (1924) - Bit Role (uncredited)
- Three Women (1924) - Nightclub patron (uncredited)
- Smouldering Fires (1925) - Member of the Committee
- The Mad Whirl (1925) - Bit Part (uncredited)
- Stop Flirting (1925) - One of Vivian's Admirers (uncredited)
- I'll Show You the Town (1925) - Masher (uncredited)
- The Merry Widow (1925) - Maxim's Waiter (uncredited)
- California Straight Ahead (1925) - Valet (uncredited)
- His People (1925) - Dinner Guest (uncredited)
- Fifth Avenue (1926) - Bit Role (uncredited)
- My Old Dutch (1926) - Al
- Mantrap (1926) - Barber (uncredited)
- Beau Geste (1926) - Minor Role (uncredited)
- Bromo and Juliet (1926) - Stage Manager (uncredited)
- Bardelys the Magnificent (1926) - Fop (uncredited)
- Kid Boots (1926) - Physical Therapist (uncredited)
- Upstage (1926) - Actor (uncredited)
- Flesh and the Devil (1926) - Women's Hat Salesman (uncredited)
- The Whole Town's Talking (1926) - Masher in Hotel Lobby (uncredited)
- The Denver Dude (1927) - Henry Bird
- Uncle Tom's Cabin (1927) - Adolph (uncredited)
- Compassion (1927)
- Her Wild Oat (1927) - Man at Photo Studio (uncredited)
- Riley of the Rainbow Division (1928)
- The Adorable Cheat (1928) - Card Playing Guest
- The Chinatown Mystery (1928)
- The Battle of the Sexes (1928) - Marie's Barber (uncredited)
- Show People (1928) - Portrait Photographer (uncredited)
- Riley the Cop (1928) - French Restaurant Patron (uncredited)
- Naughty Baby (1928) - Madame Fleurette's Husband (uncredited)
- Making the Grade (1929) - Valet
- The Iron Mask (1929) - Louis XIII
- Thunderbolt (1929) - 1st Prison Doctor (uncredited)
- Street Girl (1929) - Patron at Little Aregon (uncredited)
- The Love Trap (1929) - Drunk (uncredited)
- Sailor's Holiday (1929) - Ferris Wheel Barker (uncredited)
- One Hysterical Night (1929) - Arthur Bixby
- The Last Performance (1929) - Clothing Store Clerk (uncredited)
- Double Whoopee (1929) - Desk Clerk (uncredited)
- The Phantom in the House (1929) - The Marquis, Dorothy's Suitor (uncredited)
- It's a Great Life (1929) - Bit Role (uncredited)
- Party Girl (1930) - Maitre D' (uncredited)
- They Learned About Women (1930) - Baseball Spectator (uncredited)
- Slightly Scarlet (1930) - Gendarme (uncredited)
- Such Men Are Dangerous (1930) - Charity Bazaar Auctioneer (uncredited)
- Le joueur de golf (1930) - (uncredited)
- Show Girl in Hollywood (1930) - Headwaiter in New York (uncredited)
- Paramount on Parade (1930) - Minor Role (uncredited)
- Swing High (1930) - Trouper (uncredited)
- Sweethearts and Wives (1930) - Waiter
- For the Defense (1930) - Juror (uncredited)
- Rain or Shine (1930) - Waiter at Dinner Party (uncredited)
- Sweet Kitty Bellairs (1930) - Alphonse (uncredited)
- Romance (1930) - Opera Audience Member (uncredited)
- Monte Carlo (1930) - Hairdresser (uncredited)
- Half Shot at Sunrise (1930) - French Waiter (uncredited)
- Those Three French Girls (1930) - Gendarme (uncredited)
- The Life of the Party (1930) - Man Who Wants to Hear 'Poison Ivy' (uncredited)
- A Lady's Morals (1930) - Jenny's Italian Hair Stylist (uncredited)
- Once a Sinner (1931) - Salon Extra (uncredited)
- Finn and Hattie (1931) - Paris Taxi Driver (uncredited)
- 50 Million Frenchmen (1931) - Taxi Driver (uncredited)
- Man of the World (1931) - Hotel Desk Clerk (uncredited)
- Just a Gigolo (1931) - Headwaiter (uncredited)
- Transgression (1931) - Beauty Salon Manager (uncredited)
- The Woman Between (1931) - Headwaiter (uncredited)
- Nuit d'Espagne (1931) - (uncredited)
- The Galloping Ghost (1931, Serial) - Red Raven Waiter (uncredited)
- Monkey Business (1931) - Barber #2 (uncredited)
- New Adventures of Get Rich Quick Wallingford (1931) - Barber (uncredited)
- Her Majesty, Love (1931) - Hotel Clerk (uncredited)
- Ladies of the Big House (1931) - Florist Shop Customer (uncredited)
- Devil on Deck (1932) - Frenchie
- The Passionate Plumber (1932) - Tony's Second (uncredited)
- The Big Timer (1932) - French Chef (uncredited)
- Are You Listening? (1932) - Hotel Manager (uncredited)
- This Is the Night (1932) - Boulevardier (uncredited)
- Grand Hotel (1932) - Hotel Guest in Bar (uncredited)
- New Morals for Old (1932) - Art Student (uncredited)
- Unashamed (1932) - Florist (uncredited)
- Winner Take All (1932) - Stork Club Waiter (uncredited)
- Love Me Tonight (1932) - Taxi Driver (uncredited)
- Crooner (1932) - Waiter (uncredited)
- Back Street (1932) - Croupier (uncredited)
- The Girl from Calgary (1932) - Beauty Contest Judge (uncredited)
- Trouble in Paradise (1932) - Purse Salesman (uncredited)
- Evenings for Sale (1932) - Gigolo (uncredited)
- Central Park (1932) - Casino Patron (uncredited)
- The Match King (1932) - 2nd In-Room Waiter (uncredited)
- Tonight Is Ours (1933) - Nightclub Patron (uncredited)
- Luxury Liner (1933) - Ship Passenger (uncredited)
- Topaze (1933) - Restaurant Attendant (uncredited)
- What! No Beer? (1933) - Barber (uncredited)
- 42nd Street (1933) - Extra on Stage (uncredited)
- Clear All Wires! (1933) - French Radio Operator (uncredited)
- Blondie Johnson (1933) - Pierre - Tailor (uncredited)
- The Little Giant (1933) - Waiter (uncredited)
- The World Gone Mad (1933) - Man on Phone (uncredited)
- Reunion in Vienna (1933) - Valet (uncredited)
- The Devil's Brother (1933) - Tavern Patron (uncredited)
- Adorable (1933) - Orchestra Leader (uncredited)
- The Nuisance (1933) - Man Who Will Be Late to Work (uncredited)
- Cocktail Hour (1933) - Hotel Clerk (uncredited)
- Private Detective 62 (1933) - Casino Man (uncredited)
- Laughing at Life (1933) - Hotel Clerk (uncredited)
- She Had to Say Yes (1933) - Hotel Desk Clerk (uncredited)
- Notorious But Nice (1933) - French Waiter (uncredited)
- Meet the Baron (1933) - Pants Presser (uncredited)
- The Way to Love (1933) - André (uncredited)
- Walls of Gold (1933) - Ritchie's Barber (uncredited)
- Carnival Lady (1933) - Carnival Barker (uncredited)
- Design for Living (1933) - Bed Salesman (uncredited)
- Jimmy and Sally (1933) - 2nd Waiter at Club Rendezvous (uncredited)
- The Worst Woman in Paris? (1933) - Orchestra Leader (uncredited)
- The Sin of Nora Moran (1933) - Stage Manager
- Cross Country Cruise (1934) - Second Dodd's Salesman (uncredited)
- Palooka (1934) - Alphonse (uncredited)
- The Cat and the Fiddle (1934) - Bit Part (uncredited)
- Hollywood Party (1934) - Bit Part (uncredited)
- Wonder Bar (1934) - First Waiter (uncredited)
- Stingaree (1934) - Coutouriere (uncredited)
- The Thin Man (1934) - Waiter (uncredited)
- Many Happy Returns (1934) - Clerk (uncredited)
- Bachelor Bait (1934) - Waiter at the Ritz (uncredited)
- Paris Interlude (1934) - Waiter at Railroad Station (uncredited)
- Now and Forever (1934) - Hotel Manager (uncredited)
- Kansas City Princess (1934) - Hotel Escort (uncredited)
- Young and Beautiful (1934) - Pierre, Waiter (uncredited)
- The Merry Widow (1934) - Gabrielovitsch (uncredited)
- Kid Millions (1934) - Ship's Passenger (uncredited)
- I Am a Thief (1934) - Waiter (uncredited)
- Here Is My Heart (1934) - Artist (uncredited)
- The Man Who Reclaimed His Head (1934) - Waiter (uncredited)
- Charlie Chan in Paris (1935) - Bank Teller (uncredited)
- Lottery Lover (1935) - Barber (uncredited)
- Ruggles of Red Gap (1935) - Barber in Paris (uncredited)
- All the King's Horses (1935) - Orchestra Leader (uncredited)
- Paris in Spring (1935) - Modiste
- Mad Love (1935) - Traffic Gendarme (uncredited)
- Broadway Gondolier (1935) - Mrs. Flaggenheim's Secretary (uncredited)
- Here Comes the Band (1935) - Violinist (scenes deleted)
- 1,000 Dollars a Minute (1935) - Louie (uncredited)
- A Night at the Opera (1935) - Aviator (uncredited)
- Anna Karenina (1935) - Soldier (Uncredited)
- Ship Cafe (1935) - French Chauffeur (uncredited)
- Stars Over Broadway (1935) - Opera Aficionado (uncredited)
- Coronado (1935) - Maitre d' (uncredited)
- A Tale of Two Cities (1935) - Condemned Dandy (uncredited)
- Anything Goes (1936) - Bearded Man (uncredited)
- Rose Marie (1936) - Admirer (uncredited)
- Camille (1936) - Party guest (Uncredited)
- Under Two Flags (1936) - Mouche (uncredited)
- The Accusing Finger (1936) - Waiter (uncredited)
- Smartest Girl in Town (1936) - Hotel Desk Clerk (uncredited)
- Bill Cracks Down (1937) - Jewelry Salesman (uncredited)
- Thin Ice (1937) - Waiter (uncredited)
- Cafe Metropole (1937) - Flower Clerk (uncredited)
- Shall We Dance (1937) - Ballet Master (uncredited)
- Rhythm in the Clouds (1937) - Victor
- High, Wide, and Handsome (1937) - Photographer (uncredited)
- Souls at Sea (1937) - Friend of Gastonet (uncredited)
- The Firefly (1937) - Hat Vendor (uncredited)
- A Day at the Races (1937) - Water Carnival Guest / Racetrack Spectator (uncredited)
- Conquest (1937) Cossack/Soldier (uncredited)
- Double or Nothing (1937) - Headwaiter (uncredited)
- One Hundred Men and a Girl (1937) - Party Guest at Mrs. Frost's (uncredited)
- The Girl Said No (1937) - Headwaiter at the Ritz (uncredited)
- Hitting a New High (1937) - Photographer (uncredited)
- Paradise for Three (1938) - Plaza Hotel Clerk Going to Fire (uncredited)
- Bluebeard's Eighth Wife (1938) - Floorwalker
- A Trip to Paris (1938) - Valet (uncredited)
- Stolen Heaven (1938) - Gottlieb
- I'll Give a Million (1938) - Telegraph Clerk
- Letter of Introduction (1938) - Fitter (uncredited)
- A Desperate Adventure (1938) - Prefect of Police
- Under the Big Top (1938) - Pierre
- That Certain Age (1938) - Party Decorator (uncredited)
- Strange Faces (1938) - Waiter (uncredited)
- Adventure in Sahara (1938) - Airline Officer (uncredited)
- Daffy Duck in Hollywood (1938) - Von Hamburger (voice, uncredited)
- Topper Takes a Trip (1938) - Roulette Croupier (uncredited)
- The Story of Vernon and Irene Castle (1939) - Emile Aubel
- The Wizard of Oz (1939) - Oz Balloon Ascensionist (uncredited)
- Ninotchka (1939) - Hotel Manager
- At The Circus (1939) - Courtroom Spectator (scene deleted)/Circus Spectator (uncredited)
- Charlie Chan in City in Darkness (1939) - Hotel Clerk (uncredited)
- Everything Happens at Night (1939) - Waiter
- The Mad Empress (1939) - Tudos - the Cook
- I Was an Adventuress (1940) - Waiter
- Florian (1940) - Candy Shop Proprietor (uncredited)
- Private Affairs (1940) - Tailor (uncredited)
- Golden Gloves (1940) - Perfume Customer (uncredited)
- Laughing at Danger (1940) - Pierre
- Hired Wife (1940) - Maitre D' (uncredited)
- Seven Sinners (1940) - Henchman (uncredited)
- Go West (1940) - Saloon Patron/Train Passenger (uncredited)
- That Uncertain Feeling (1941) - Art Dealer (uncredited)
- The Big Store (1941) - Man in Crowd (uncredited)
- Two-Faced Woman (1941) - Nightclub Patron (uncredited)
- Angels with Broken Wings (1941) - (uncredited)
- San Antonio Rose (1941) - Henry (uncredited)
- Law of the Tropics (1941) - Tailor
- That Forsyte Woman (1949) - M. Braval, Gallery Official in Paris (uncredited)
- Let's Dance (1950) - Jewelry Clerk (uncredited)
- A Millionaire for Christy (1951) - Wedding Usher (uncredited)
- My Favorite Spy (1951) - Room Service Waiter (uncredited)
- Something to Live For (1952) - Frenchman (uncredited)
- April in Paris (1952) - Waiter (uncredited)
- The Mississippi Gambler (1953) - Tailor (uncredited)
- Gentlemen Prefer Blondes (1953) - Waiter (uncredited)
- Phantom of the Rue Morgue (1954) - LeBon
- So This Is Paris (1954) - Cab Driver (uncredited)
- The Birds and the Bees (1956) - Cabin Steward (uncredited)
- Silk Stockings (1957) - Stage Manager (uncredited)
- Bedtime Story (1964) - Waiter (uncredited)
- 36 Hours (1964) - Frenchman (uncredited)
- The Art of Love (1965) - Cab Driver (uncredited)
- Darling Lili (1970) - French Stage Manager (uncredited)
- Young Frankenstein (1974) - Train Conductor
- The Hindenburg (1975) - Ambassador Luther (uncredited)
- The Happy Hooker Goes to Washington (1977) - Man at Airport
- The World's Greatest Lover (1977) - Conductor
- Love at First Bite (1979) - Maitre d'
- The Frisco Kid (1979) - Rabbi #4 (final film role)

== Selected television appearances ==
- Adventures of Superman (1956) (Season 4 Episode 3: "The Big Freeze") as Dr. Watts
- Combat! (1963) (Season 1 Episode 25: "The Quiet Warrior") as Dr. Barole
- The Alfred Hitchcock Hour (1964) (Season 2 Episode 13: "The Magic Shop") as Old Man
- The Addams Family (1964) (Season 1 Episode 1: "The Addams Family Goes to School") as Postman
- The Addams Family (1964) (Season 1 Episode 16: "The Addams Family Meets the Undercover Man") as Mr. Briggs
- Petticoat Junction (1964) (Season 1 Episode 22: "The Art Game") as Gallery Attendee (uncredited)
- The Man From U.N.C.L.E. (1965) (Season 1 Episode 28: "The Girls of Nazarone Affair") as Gardenia Vendor
- The Addams Family (1966) (Season 2 Episode 18: "Fester Goes on a Diet") as Mailman
- Petticoat Junction (1968) (Season 5 Episode 30: "Kate's Homecoming") as Station Master
- Petticoat Junction (1969) (Season 7 Episode 14: "But I've Never Been in Erie, PA") as Madame Levelle
- Kung Fu (1974) (Season 2 Episode 18: "Crossties") as Stationmaster
