= Chris-Pin Martin =

American actor (1893–1953)

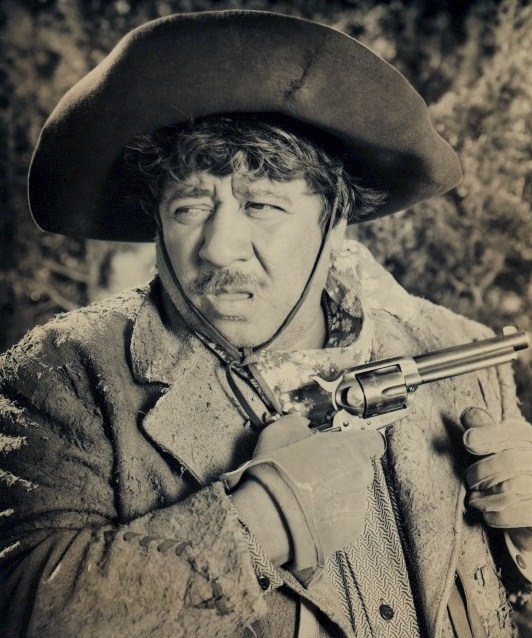
- Chris-Pin Martin in American Empire (1942)
- Born: Ysabel Ponciana Chris-Pin Martin Paiz; November 19, 1893; Tucson, Arizona, U.S.
- Died: June 27, 1953 (aged 59); Montebello, California, U.S.
- Occupation: Actor

Chris-Pin Martin (born Ysabel Ponciana Chris-Pin Martin Paiz, November 19, 1893 – June 27, 1953) was an American character actor whose specialty lay in portraying comical Mexicans, particularly sidekicks in The Cisco Kid film series. He acted in over 100 films between 1925 and 1953, including over 50 westerns.

== Biography ==
Martin was born in Tucson, Arizona, when Arizona was still a territory, the son of Toro "Bull" Martin, a Yaqui indian, and Florencia Paiz, a woman of Mexican descent from southern Arizona and northern Sonora, Mexico. He started working in Hollywood in 1911, as an extra for Universal Studios, and also worked as a recruitment agent ("runner") for hiring Latino and Latina extras needed for specific films at Hollywood studios.

In 1922, Martin produced a film, Tepee Love, a romance, starring Martin and Dolores Contreras. The film played in Glendale, California, and Burbank, California, in 1922; a second film project never was finished. By 1925, Martin had become a frequent, although unnamed character, in silent movies. His roles were as a bumbling or slow comedic character who spoke in broken English.

Martin's most remembered western film role was in nine of the Cisco Kid films playing the Kid's sidekicks Gordito and in the later films Pancho. He also appeared in the John Ford classic Stagecoach (1939) with John Wayne. He was credited in his films by other names, as well, including Chrispin Martin, Chris King Martin, Chris Martin, Cris-Pin Martin, and Ethier Crispin Martini.

Martin was adept in both drama and comedy, in films like the melodramatic The Ox-Bow Incident (1943) as "Poncho" the Mexican who reluctantly becomes a part of a lynch mob and a contrite confessor. In A Millionaire for Christy (1951) Martin plays a brief but memorable role as "Manolo", a Mexican who speaks no English.

== Death ==
Less than five months before his 60th birthday, Martin died of a heart attack while addressing a Moose lodge meeting in the Los Angeles suburb of Montebello.

== Selected filmography ==
- The Lost World (1925) – (scenes deleted)
- The Gold Rush (1925) – Man in Dance Hall (uncredited)
- Border Vengeance (1925) – Bartender (uncredited)
- Lord Jim (1925) – One of Brown's Crewmen (uncredited)
- Cactus Trails (1925) – Bartender (uncredited)
- The Temptress (1926) – Argentine Ranch Hand (uncredited)
- The Night of Love (1927) – Gypsy (uncredited)
- The Gaucho (1927) – Minor Role (uncredited)
- In Old Arizona (1928)
- The Crowd (1928) – Worker in Hallway (uncredited)
- Across to Singapore (1928) – Sailor from the Santa Rosa (uncredited)
- The Rescue (1929) – Tenga
- Where East Is East (1929) – Native Hunter (uncredited)
- Condemned (1929) – Monkey Seller (uncredited)
- Under a Texas Moon (1930) – Pancho (uncredited)
- The Fighting Legion (1930) – Henchman (uncredited)
- The Big House (1930) – Inmate (uncredited)
- Wings of Adventure (1930) – Lopez (uncredited)
- Billy the Kid (1930) – Don Esteban Santiago
- The Lash (1930) – Caballero (uncredited)
- Strangers May Kiss (1931) – Mexican (uncredited)
- Transgression (1931) – Eduardo, the Mail Carrier (uncredited)
- Nuit d'Espagne (1931) – (uncredited)
- The Squaw Man (1931) – Spanish Pete – Hawkins' Henchman
- Lasca of the Rio Grande (1931) – (uncredited)
- The Cisco Kid (1931) – Gordito
- Safe in Hell (1931) – Jury Member (uncredited)
- South of Santa Fe (1932) – Pedro
- Girl of the Rio (1932) – (uncredited)
- Girl Crazy (1932) – Pete
- The Broken Wing (1932) – Mexican Husband
- Destry Rides Again (1932) – Lopez (uncredited)
- The Stoker (1932) – Chief of Police
- Winner Take All (1932) – Pice's Manager in Tijuana (uncredited)
- The Painted Woman (1932) – Francois Marquette aka Frenchy
- Flaming Gold (1932) – Chris – Oil Well Foreman (uncredited)
- Outlaw Justice (1932) – El Diablo
- The Mask of Fu Manchu (1932) – Potentate (uncredited)
- Terror Trail (1933) – Jose (uncredited)
- The California Trail (1933) – Pancho
- Central Airport (1933) – Havana Air Port worker (uncredited)
- I Loved You Wednesday (1933) – Chris – the Waiter (uncredited)
- The Man from Monterey (1933) – Manuel (uncredited)
- The Last Trail (1933) – Mexican Officer (uncredited)
- Four Frightened People (1934) – Native Boatman
- Heat Lightning (1934) – Mexican Husband with Family (uncredited)
- Lazy River (1934) – Raoul (uncredited)
- Viva Villa! (1934) – Peón (scenes deleted)
- Rawhide Mail (1934) – Pedro Esteban
- Grand Canary (1934) – Henchman (uncredited)
- La Cucaracha (1934, Short) – Chiquita's Fan in Cafe (uncredited)
- Chained (1934) – Peón (uncredited)
- Marie Galante (1934) – Furniture Dealer (uncredited)
- The Marines Are Coming (1934) – Carlos, Aide to the Torch (uncredited)
- The Cactus Kid (1935) – Gambler (uncredited)
- Bordertown (1935) – José (uncredited)
- In Caliente (1935) – Mariachi (uncredited)
- Under the Pampas Moon (1935) – Pietro
- Red Salute (1935) – Men's Room Attendant (uncredited)
- Hi, Gaucho! (1935) – Marco (uncredited)
- Escape from Devil's Island (1935) – Goat Herder (uncredited)
- Coronado (1935) – Mexican (uncredited)
- Captain Blood (1935) – Sentry (uncredited)
- The Border Patrolman (1936) – Mexican Giving Directions (uncredited)
- The Gay Desperado (1936) – Pancho
- A Tenderfoot Goes West (1936) – Pedro
- The Bold Caballero (1936) – Hangman
- When You're in Love (1937) – Servant (uncredited)
- Swing High, Swing Low (1937) – Sleepy Servant (uncredited)
- Under Strange Flags (1937) – Lopez
- A Star Is Born (1937) – José Rodriguez (uncredited)
- Boots and Saddles (1937) – Juan
- The Hurricane (1937) – Sailor (uncredited)
- Zorro Rides Again (1937, Serial) – Pedro – Wagon Driver [Ch. 1] (uncredited)
- Wallaby Jim of the Islands (1937) – Mike
- Born to Be Wild (1938) – Garcia (uncredited)
- Four Men and a Prayer (1938) – Sergeant in Marlanda (uncredited)
- Blockade (1938) – Cantina Patron (uncredited)
- Tropic Holiday (1938) – Pancho
- I'm From the City (1938) – Mexican Ranch Hand (uncredited)
- The Texans (1938) – Juan Rodriguez (uncredited)
- Billy the Kid Returns (1938) – Desk Clerk (uncredited)
- Too Hot to Handle (1938) – Pedro (uncredited)
- The Renegade Ranger (1938) – Felipe (uncredited)
- Flirting with Fate (1938) – Solado
- Stagecoach (1939) – Chris, innkeeper (uncredited)
- Rough Riders' Round-up (1939) – Ramon (uncredited)
- Frontier Pony Express (1939) – Deer Lodge Station Agent (uncredited)
- The Return of the Cisco Kid (1939) – Gordito
- Man of Conquest (1939) – Massacre Survivor (uncredited)
- Code of the Secret Service (1939) – Mexican Pottery Proprietor (uncredited)
- The Girl and the Gambler (1939) – Pasqual
- Frontier Marshal (1939) – Pete
- The Fighting Gringo (1939) – Felipe – Barber
- Espionage Agent (1939) – Tunisian Guard (uncredited)
- Rio (1939) – Roberto's Ranch Foreman (uncredited)
- The Llano Kid (1939) – Sixto
- The Cisco Kid and the Lady (1939) – Gordito
- Charlie Chan in Panama (1940) – Sergeant Montero
- Viva Cisco Kid (1940) – Gordito
- Lucky Cisco Kid (1940) – Gordito
- The Gay Caballero (1940) – Gordito
- Down Argentine Way (1940) – Esteban
- Mark of Zorro (1940) – Turnkey
- Charter Pilot (1940) – Captain of Police (uncredited)
- Romance of the Rio Grande (1940) – Gordito
- The Bad Man (1941) – Pedro
- Ride on Vaquero (1941) – Gordito
- Week-End in Havana (1941) – Driver
- Tombstone, the Town Too Tough to Die (1942) – Chris
- Undercover Man (1942) – Miguel
- American Empire (1942) – Augustin- Beauchard Henchman
- The Ox-Bow Incident (1943) – Poncho
- The Sultan's Daughter (1943) – Merchant
- Ali Baba and the Forty Thieves (1944) – Fat Thief
- Tampico (1944) – Waiter at Wedding Party (uncredited)
- Along Came Jones (1944) – Store Proprietor (uncredited)
- San Antonio (1945) – Jaime Rosas (uncredited)
- The Gay Cavalier (1946)
- Perilous Holiday (1946) – Store Proprietor (uncredited)
- Suspense (1946) – Mexican Waiter (uncredited)
- Holiday in Mexico (1946) – (uncredited)
- Gallant Journey (1946) – Pedro Lopez (uncredited)
- The Lone Wolf in Mexico (1947) – Cab Driver (uncredited)
- The Beginning or the End (1947) – Mexican Man (uncredited)
- The Secret Life of Walter Mitty (1947) – Waiter (uncredited)
- Robin Hood of Monterey (1947) – Pancho
- King of the Bandits (1947) – Pancho
- The Fugitive (1947) – An Organ-Grinder
- Pirates of Monterey (1947) – Caretta Man (uncredited)
- Captain from Castile (1947) – Sancho Lopez (uncredited)
- Old Los Angeles (1948) – Waiter (uncredited)
- The Return of Wildfire (1948) – Pancho
- Blood on the Moon (1948) – Commisary Bartender (uncredited)
- Belle Starr's Daughter (1948) – Spanish George
- Mexican Hayride (1948) – Mariachi Leader
- Rimfire (1949) – Chico
- The Beautiful Blonde from Bashful Bend (1949) – Joe
- Borderline (1950) – Pepe – Hotel Clerk (uncredited)
- The Arizona Cowboy (1950) – Café Owner Pedro
- The Lady from Texas (1951) – José
- A Millionaire for Christy (1951) – Manolo, Fat Mexican
- Ride the Man Down (1952) – Chris
- San Antone (1953) – Ramon, Vaquero (uncredited)
- Mesa of Lost Women (1953) – Pepe (final film role)
