= The Gardens of Murcia =

The Gardens of Murcia may refer to:

- The Gardens of Murcia (1923 film), a French silent film
- The Gardens of Murcia (1936 film), a French drama film
