= Legong (film) =

Legong: Dance of the Virgins
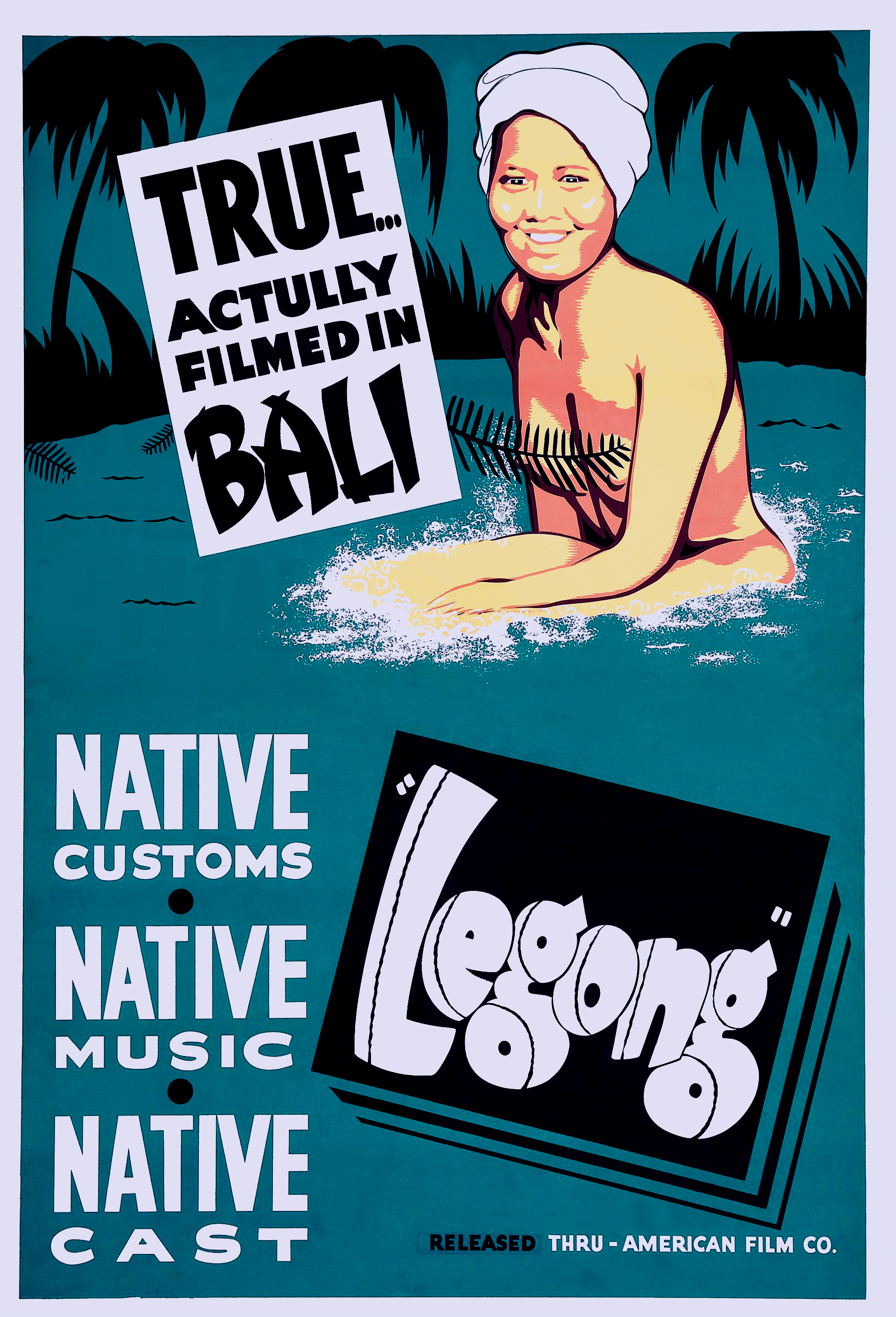
- Theatrical poster
- Directed by: Henri de La Falaise
- Written by: Hampton del Ruth (titles)
- Produced by: Constance Bennett
- Cinematography: W. Howard Greene
- Production company: Bennett Pictures Inc.
- Distributed by: DuWorld Pictures Inc. (US); Paramount International (outside US)
- Release date: October 1, 1935 (U.S.)
- Running time: 53 minutes
- Country: United States
- Languages: Synchronized sound (English Intertitles)

Legong: Dance of the Virgins is a 1935 drama travelogue sound film. It was one of the last feature films shot using the two-color Technicolor process, and one of the last films shot by a major Hollywood studio without any dialogue. While the film has no audible dialog, it was released with a synchronized musical score with sound effects. It is a drama based on a Balinese native tale, with travelogue elements depicting Balinese culture. Legong and the follow-up travelogue drama Kliou, the Killer (released on August 14, 1937) were the last mainstream silent films to be released in the US.

== Plot ==
Poutou, the daughter of Gousti Bagus, is in love with Nyong. She attends a barong dance depicting a mythical struggle between a demon and men but is only interested in Nyong, who is present in the crowd of spectators. Nyong is invited to the home of Gousti Bagus and Poutou the next day. He is on his way when he sees Poutou's sister Saplak bathing and is smitten. Nyong writes on a leaf for Saplak to meet him during the temple dance (Legong) Potou is to dance at. It is to be her last temple dance and Potou is very happy until she finds the note and learns of the betrayal. She goes to the bridge and sees the pair together and commits suicide. Gousti Bagus puts her body in a funeral pyre and burns it so she may be reincarnated.

== Cast ==
The cast were entirely native Balinese who only acted in this film.

- Poetoe Aloes Goesti as Poutou
- Bagus Mara Goesti as Gousti Bagus
- Saplak Njoman as Saplak
- Njong Njong Njoman as Nyong
- Nganjeng Ujong Ajam as Nyet
- Somplek Jeus - Entalai

== Production ==
Legong is an American exploitation film (of a type often referred to as a "goona-goona epic"). The film was shot on location in Ubud in Bali, Indonesia in 1933, and features an all-Balinese cast. The film was created during a time when Bali had become a popular destination among the Western public due to its perception as an "Eastern Paradise" compared to war-torn Western Europe.

Scenes of nudity were trimmed for release in the United States, while scenes depicting cockfighting were censored for the British release. The full film was restored in 1992 by the UCLA Film & Television Archive by combining parts of censored British, American, and Canadian prints of the film.

== Critical reception ==
Andre Sennwald of the The New York Times wrote "It is a pretty tale and the photoplay recites it simply and with faith." He noted that the Technicolor had been subdued to "inviting browns and pastel tints" and that the filmmaker "is especially skillful in photographing the games, dances and religious rituals of the Balinese, and his most fascinating scenes are those which tell of the cremation ceremonies and the ritualistic dances of the island." Sennwald concluded that "the film is effective in its description of the unstudied personal beauty of the natives and their ability to resist the raucous temptations of what we laughingly refer to as Western civilization."

Variety wrote that the film's content was "nothing to enthuse over" and that its main "sale distinction" was its use of Technicolor. They commented that "nudity is accentuated by the fact that it's done entirely in color", but advised that these scenes "will prove a disappointment to those expecting something sensational." They also noted that throughout the film "there is not a line spoken, plot development being introduced through fancy titles."

== See also ==
- List of early color feature films
