= Legong =

Indonesian traditional dance

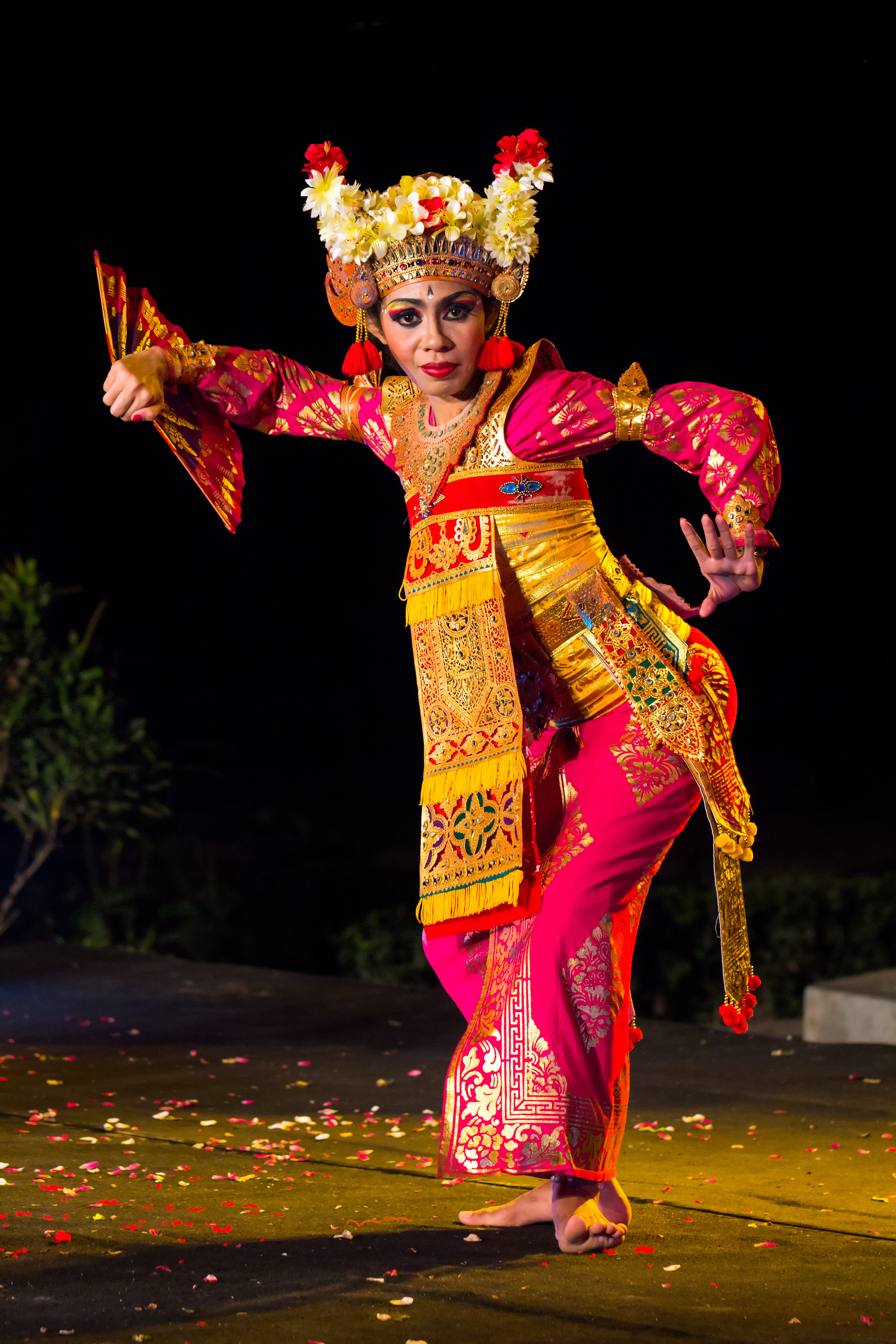
- A Balinese adult performer of Legong Bapang Saba
- Native name: Balinese: ᬮᬾᬕᭀᬂ, romanized: légong
- Instrument(s): Gamelan
- Inventor: Balinese
- Origin: Indonesia

Three genres of traditional dance in Bali
- UNESCO Intangible Cultural Heritage
- Country: Indonesia
- Reference: 00617
- Region: Asia and the Pacific

Inscription history
- Inscription: 2015 (10th session)
- List: Representative
- Wali Sacred Dances (Rejang, Sanghyang Dedari, Baris Upacara), Bebali Semi sacred Dances (Topeng Sidhakarya/Topeng Pajegan, Gambuh dance drama, Wayang Wong dance drama), Balih-balihan Entertainment Dances (Legong Kraton, Joged Bumbung, Barong Ket)

Legong (Balinese: ᬮᬾᬕᭀᬂ, légong) is a form of Balinese dance. It is a refined dance form characterized by intricate finger movements, complicated footwork, and expressive gestures and facial expressions.

== Origins ==
Legong probably originated in the 19th century as royal entertainment. Legend has it that a prince of Sukawati fell ill and had a vivid dream in which two maidens danced to gamelan music. When he recovered, he arranged for such dances to be performed in reality. Others believe that the Legong originated with the sanghyang dedari, a ceremony involving voluntary possession of two little girls by beneficent spirits. Legong is also danced at public festivals. Excerpts from Legong dance dramas are put on for tourists.

== Dancers ==
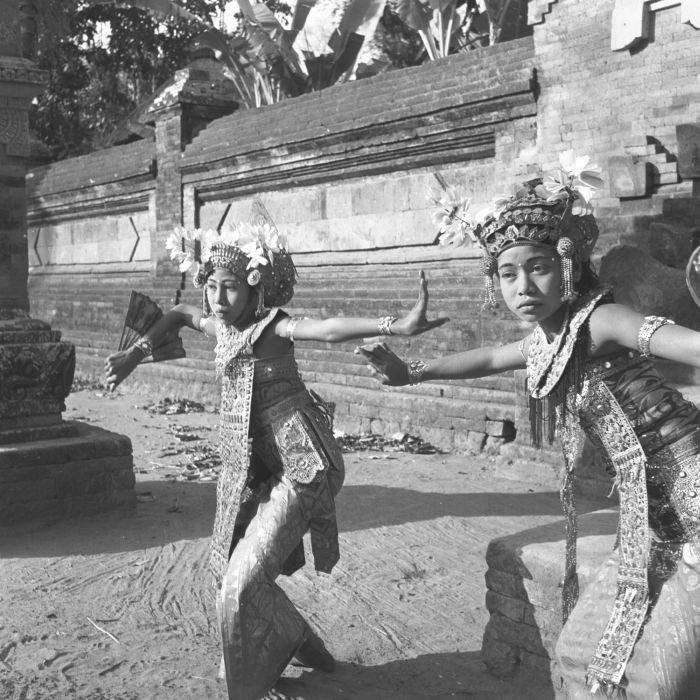
Two pre-adolescent girls performing Legong dance.

Traditionally, legong dancers were girls who had not yet reached puberty. They began rigorous training at about the age of five. These dancers were regarded highly in the society and usually became wives of royal personages or wealthy merchants. They would usually stop dancing after marriage. However, in present, Indonesia dancers may be of all ages; performances by men in women's costumes are also recorded.

== Story ==
Classical Legong enacts several traditional stories. The most common is the tale of the East Javanese king of Lasem from the Malat, a collection of heroic romances. He is at war with another king, the father (or brother) of Princess Rangkesari. Lasem wants to marry the girl, but she detests him and tries to run away. Becoming lost in the forest, she is captured by Lasem, who imprisons her and goes out for a final assault against her family. He is attacked by a monstrous raven, which foretells his death.

The dramatics are enacted in elaborate and stylized pantomime. The two little actresses are accompanied by a third dancer called a condong or attendant. She sets the scene, presents the dancers with their fans and later plays the part of the raven.

== Types ==
Traditionally, fifteen types of legong dance were known. The duration, movement, and narrative of each type differed. Some, for instance, could last for an hour. These types included:

- Legong Bapang Sabab
- Legong Jebog
- Legong Kraton
- Legong Kuntir
- Legong Lasem
- Legong Raja Cina
- Legong Semarandana
- Legong Sudasarna

== Gallery ==
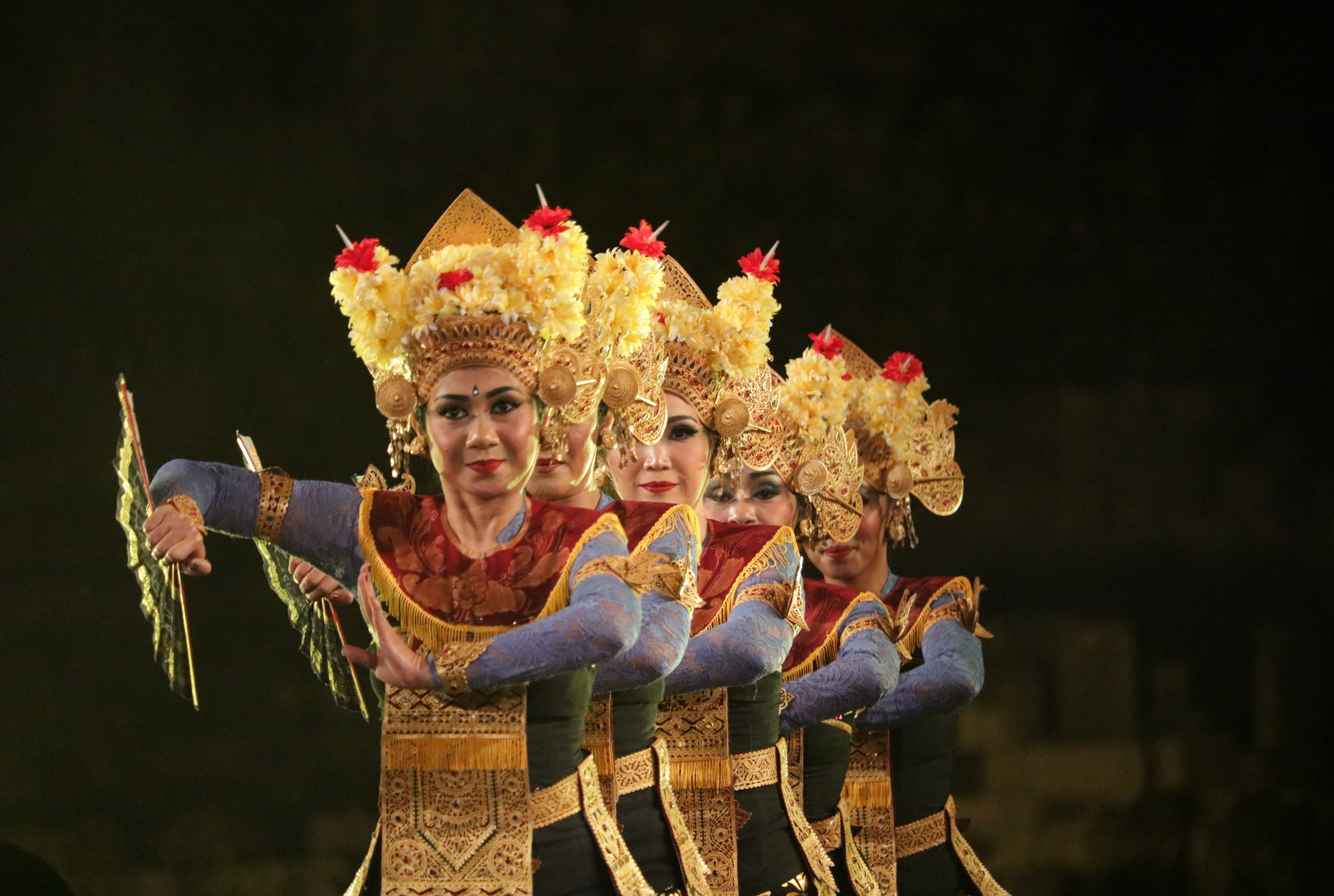
Legong Dance performance

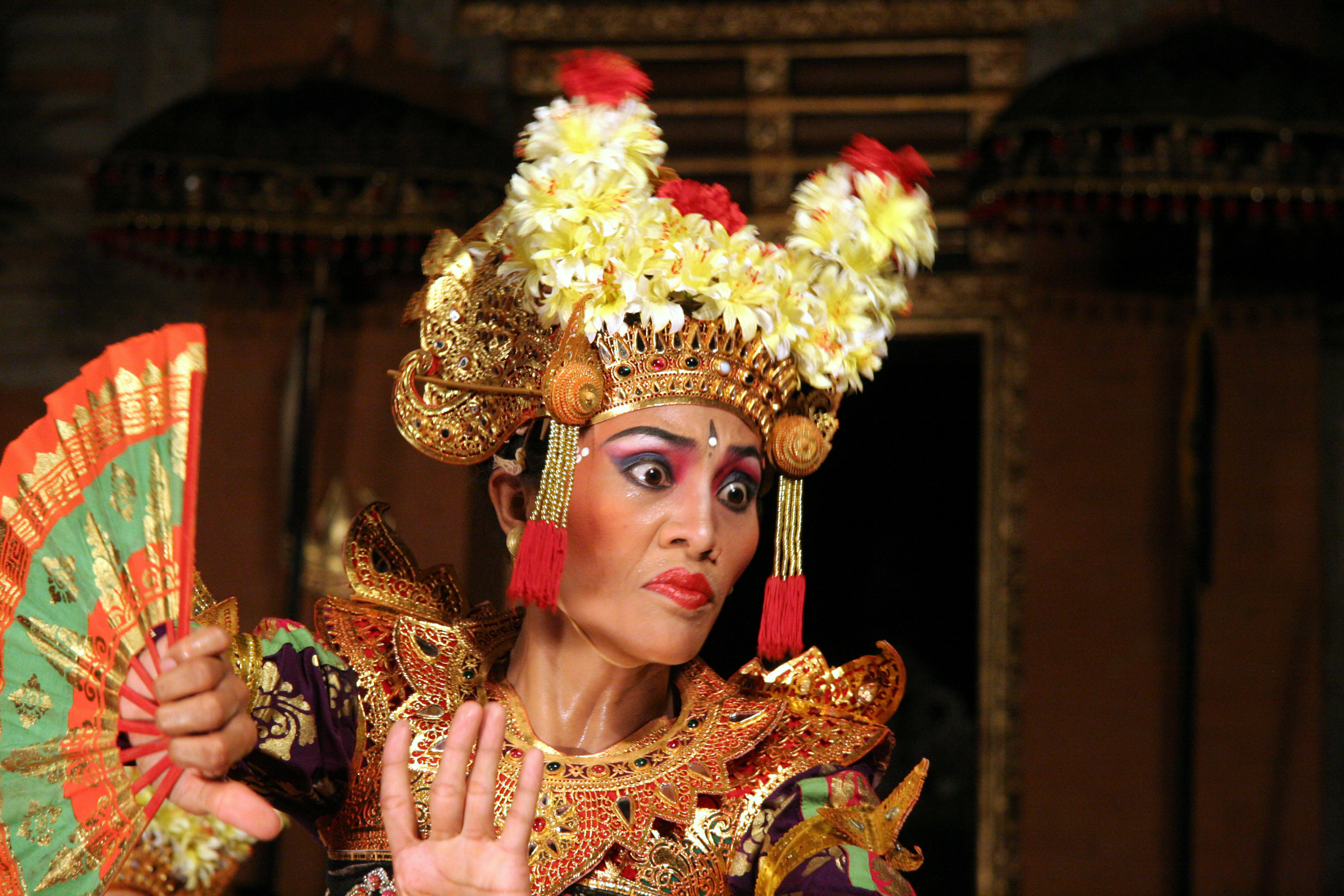

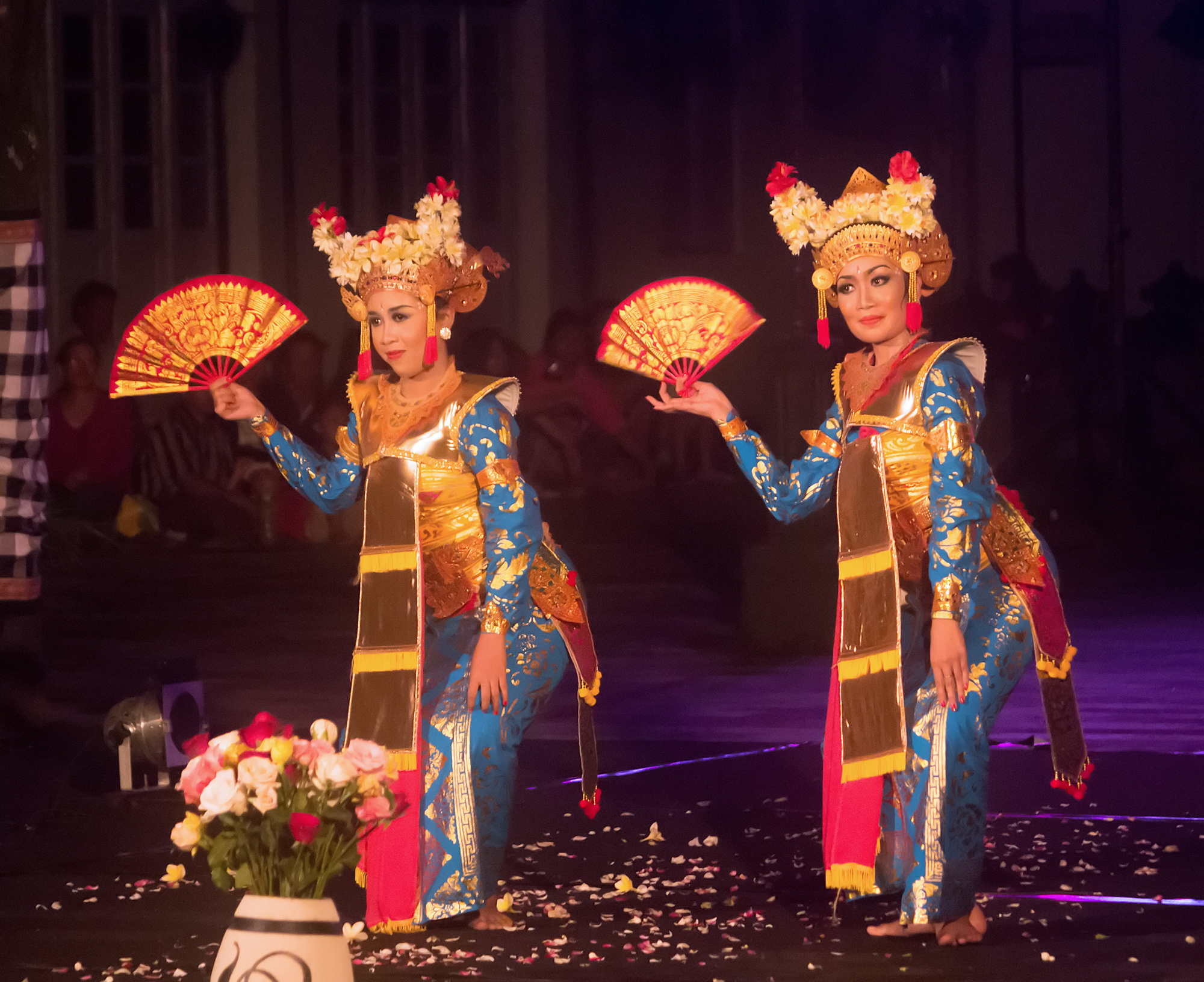

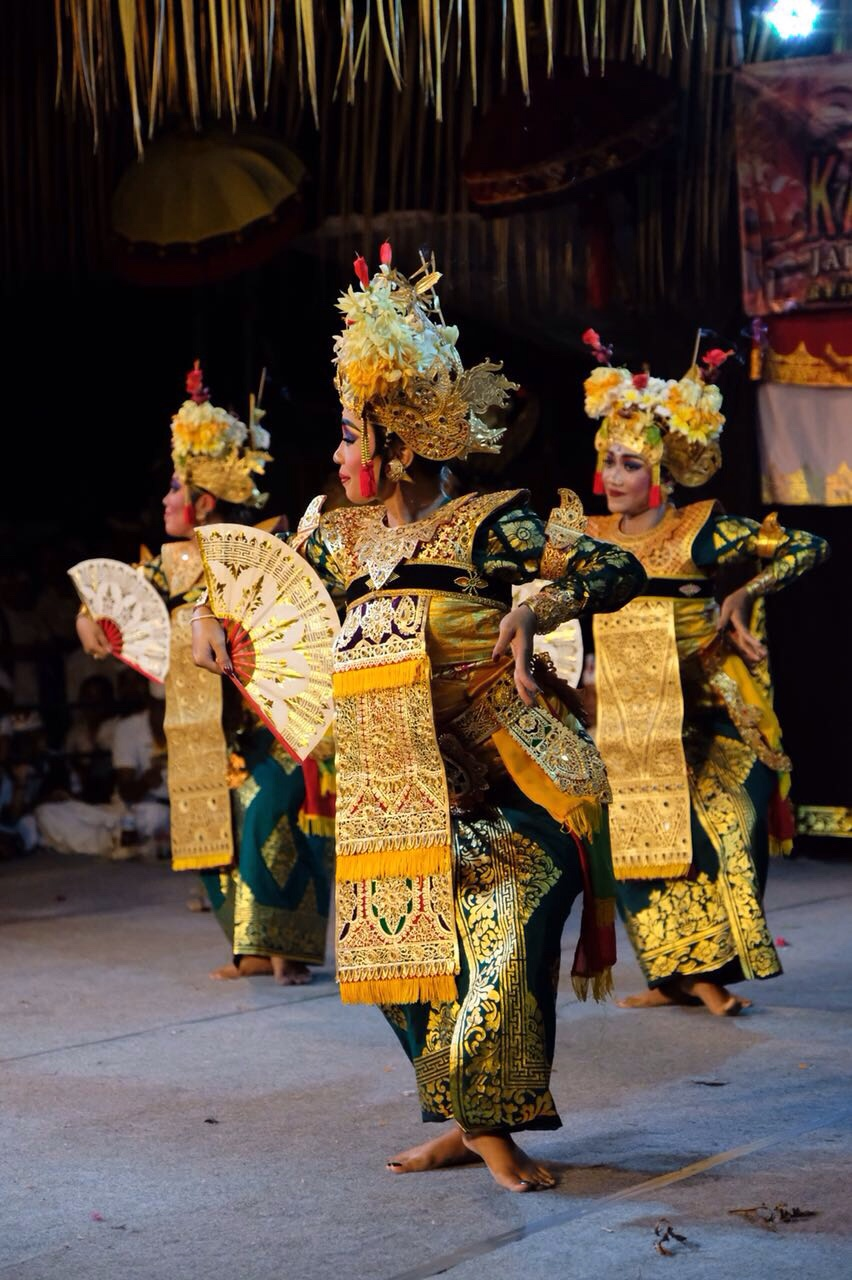

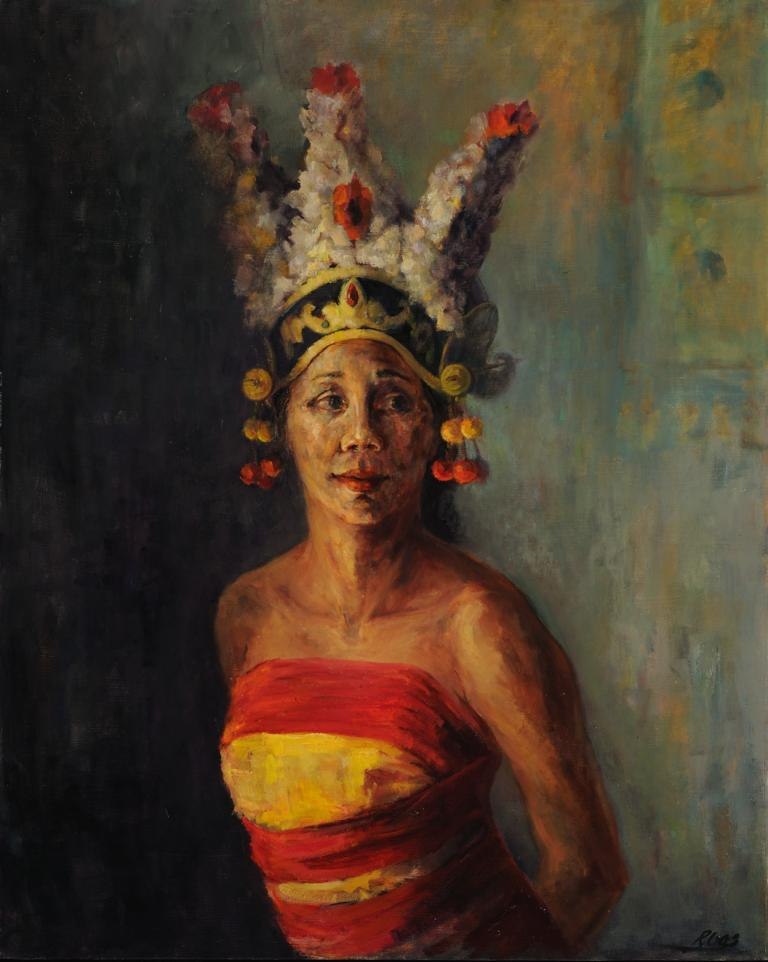

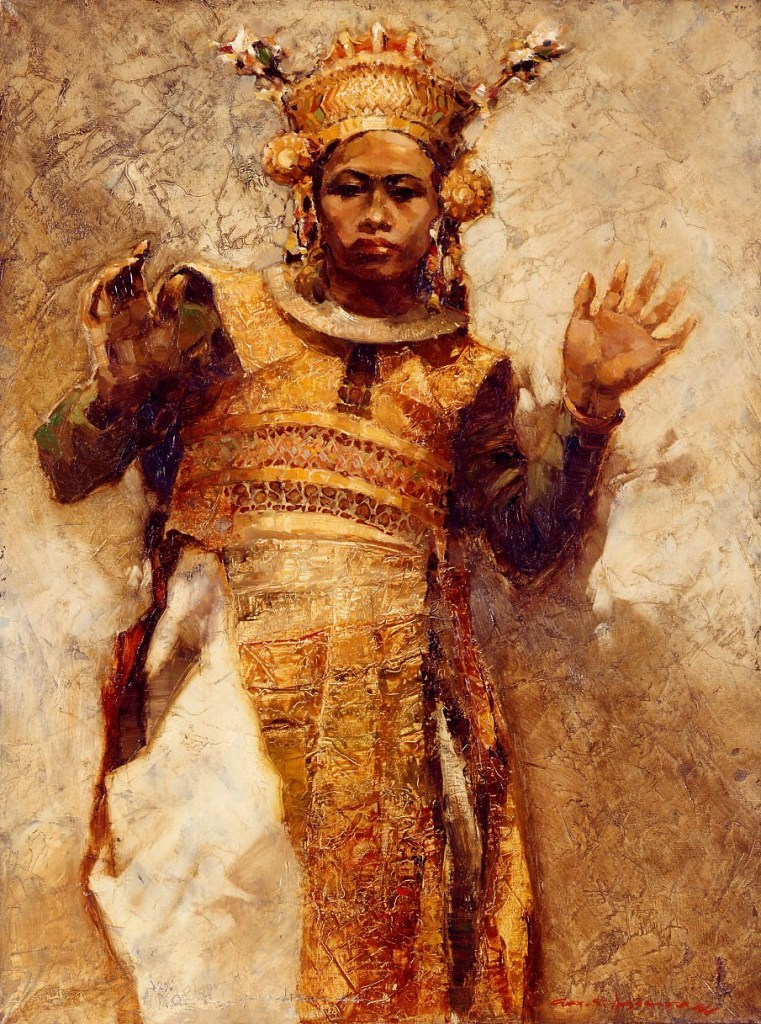

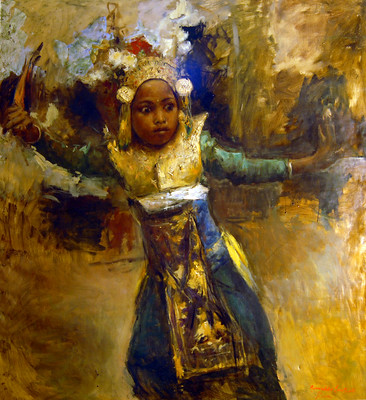

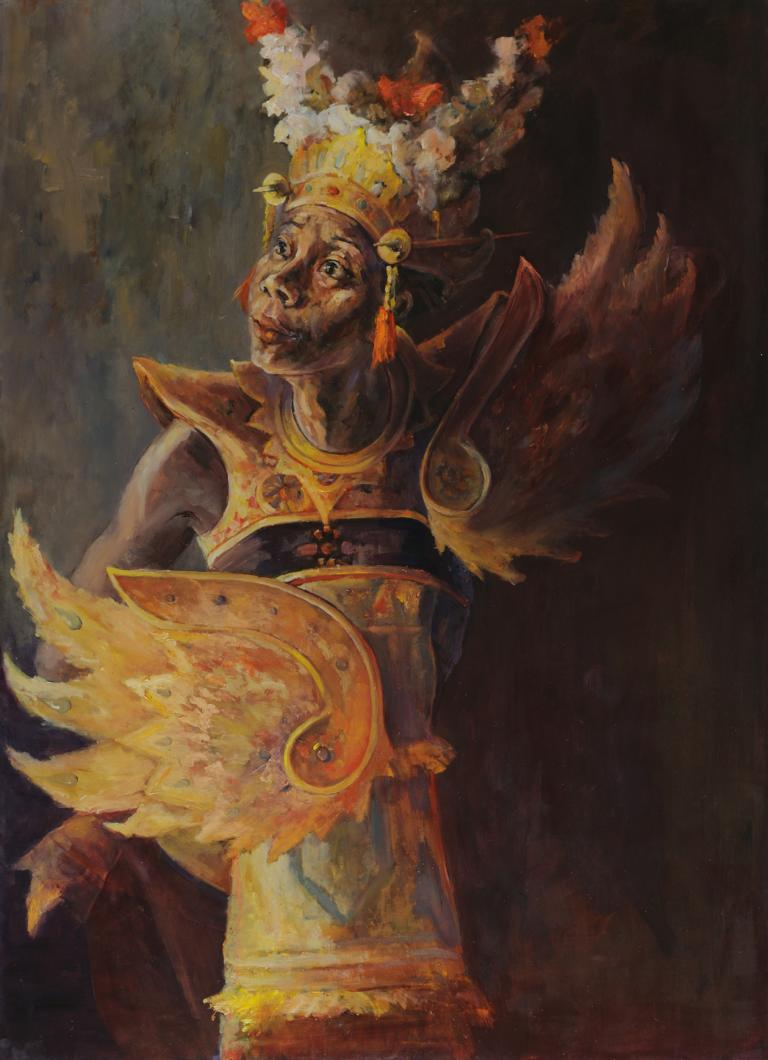

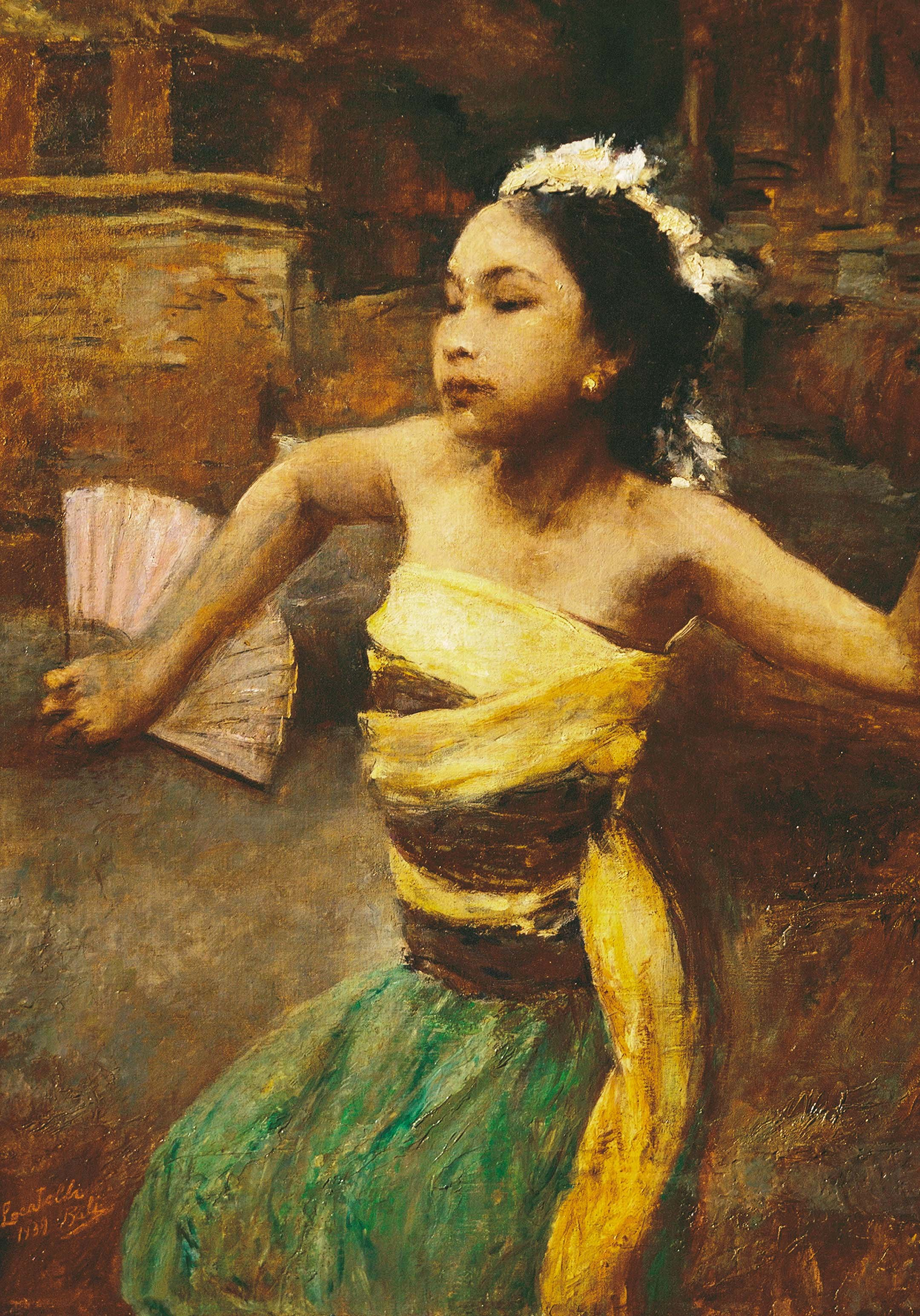

== See also ==
- Balinese dances
- Legong: Dance of the Virgins, a 1935 film
- Dance of Indonesia

== In popular culture ==
Legong is mentioned in "I've Been To Bali Too", the single by Australian folk-rock band Redgum from their 1984 album Frontline.
