= Robin Hood of Monterey =

1947 film by Christy Cabanne

- Directed by: Christy Cabanne
- Written by: Bennett Cohen; Gilbert Roland; O. Henry (character)
- Produced by: Jeffrey Bernerd
- Starring: Gilbert Roland; Chris-Pin Martin; Evelyn Brent
- Cinematography: William A. Sickner
- Edited by: Roy V. Livingston
- Music by: Edward J. Kay
- Production company: Monogram Pictures
- Distributed by: Monogram Pictures
- Release date: September 6, 1947
- Running time: 55 minutes
- Country: United States
- Language: English

Robin Hood of Monterey is a 1947 American adventure film directed by Christy Cabanne and starring Gilbert Roland, Chris-Pin Martin and Evelyn Brent. The film was part of the long-running Cisco Kid series produced by Monogram Pictures. The Cisco Kid travels to Monterey, California (then part of Mexico), where he clears the son of an old friend of a charge of murder.

== Cast ==
- Gilbert Roland as The Cisco Kid
- Chris-Pin Martin as Pancho
- Evelyn Brent as Maria Belmonte Sanchez
- Jack La Rue as Don Ricardo Gonzales
- Pedro de Cordoba as Don Carlos Belmonte
- Donna Martell as Lolita
- Travis Kent as Eduardo Belmonte
- Thornton Edwards as El Capitan
- Nestor Paiva as The Alcalde
- Ernie Adams as Pablo
- Fred Cordova as Henchman
- Ray Jones as Henchman
- Bob McElroy as Rurale
- Alex Montoya as Juan
- George Navarro as Card player
- Artie Ortego as Alcalde's carriage driver
- Julian Rivero as Doctor Martinez
- Felipe Turich as Jose - Sentry / Servant
- Bob Woodward as Pedro

== Bibliography ==
- Baugh, Scott L. Latino American Cinema: An Encyclopedia of Movies, Stars, Concepts, and Trends. ABC-CLIO, 2012.
