= Footlights and Fools =

1929 film directed by William A. Seiter

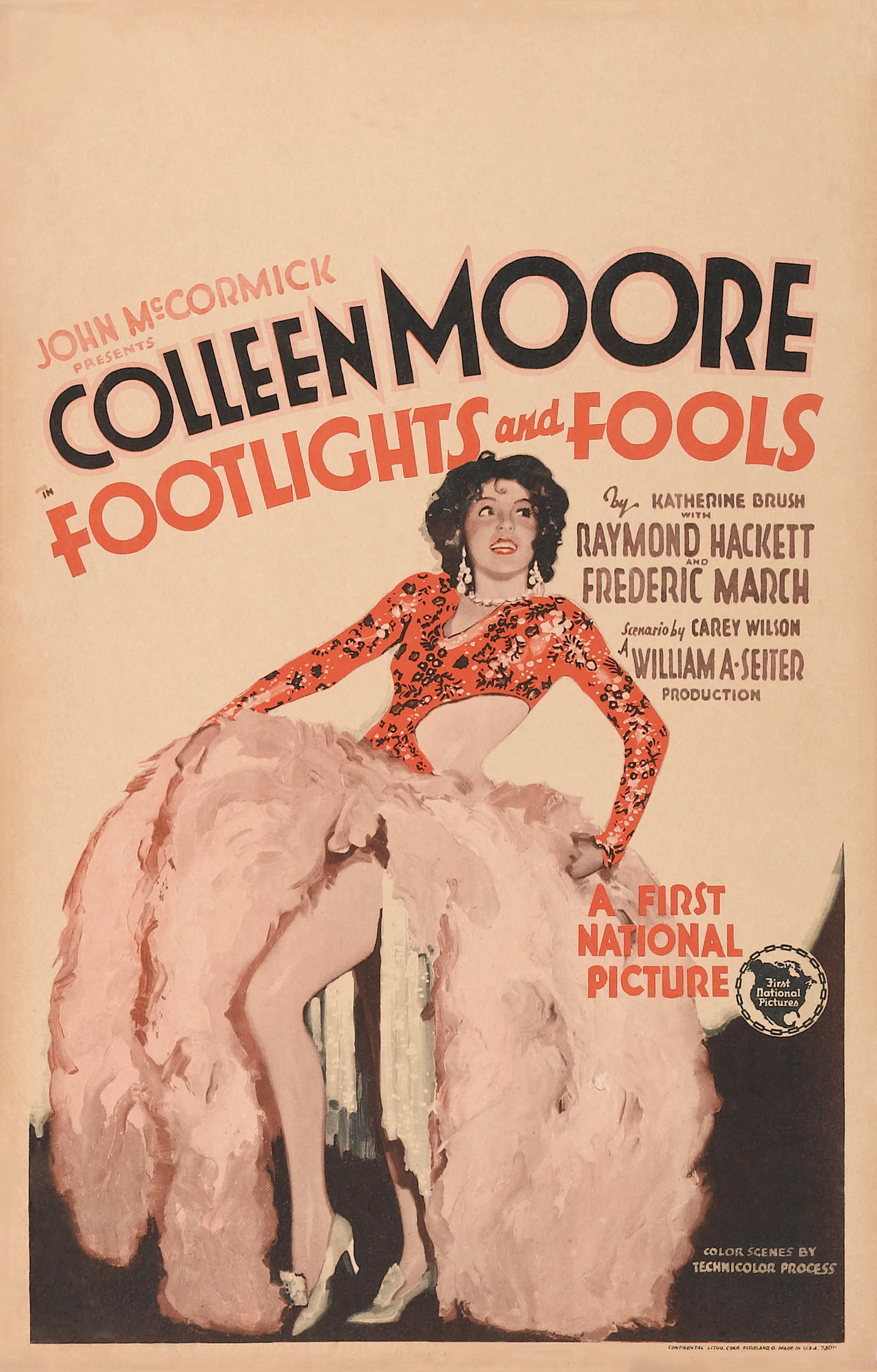
- Film poster
- Directed by: William A. Seiter
- Written by: Thomas J. Geraghty; Carey Wilson
- Produced by: John McCormick
- Starring: Colleen Moore; Raymond Hackett; Fredric March; Virginia Lee Corbin; Mickey Bennett; Edward Martindel; Adrienne D'Ambricourt
- Cinematography: Henry Freulich; Sidney Hickox
- Music by: Alois Reiser
- Production company: First National Pictures
- Distributed by: Warner Bros. Pictures
- Release date: November 8, 1929 (U.S.)
- Running time: 78 minutes
- Country: United States
- Language: English

Footlights and Fools is a 1929 American pre-Code musical drama film directed by William A. Seiter that was billed by Warner Brothers as an all-talking musical film and released in Vitaphone with Technicolor sequences.

== Plot ==
Fifi d'Auray, star of the musical revue The Sins of 1930, is in reality Betty Murphy, a once-unknown chorus girl from a humble background. In her earlier days, Betty had fallen in love with Jimmy Willet, a charming but irresponsible man whose only income comes from betting on horse races. Betty refuses to marry him until he can hold a proper job.

Now transformed into the glamorous Fifi, she attracts the attention of wealthy and eligible Gregory Pyne. He invites her to supper, but she declines. Pyne then bribes her friend Claire Floyd to bring Fifi along under false pretenses. Sensing the trick, Fifi decides to play a joke of her own: she shows up pretending to be the unsophisticated and brash Betty Murphy, making a thoroughly unimpressive impression on Pyne and storming out in mock offense.

Pyne later learns that the awkward young woman was actually Fifi herself and feels humiliated. Hoping to make amends, Claire advises him that the best way to please Fifi is to help her boyfriend find a job. Pyne arranges for Jimmy to be hired at the theatre where Fifi performs.

But when Jimmy finds out the job came through Pyne's influence, he becomes suspicious and angry. Jealous and insecure, he calls Fifi and tells her to send Pyne packing.

Shortly afterward, Pyne shows up at Fifi's apartment. Wanting to resolve the situation once and for all, she tells him bluntly that she no longer wishes to be bothered by him.

The next morning, Jimmy shows up in a panic. He claims he has been framed by Pyne. According to Jimmy, he was left alone in the cashier's cage when a robber forced him at gunpoint to hand over valuable securities. Though the thief dropped the bonds during his escape, the cashier returned in time to trigger an alarm. Jimmy is now under suspicion and a warrant has been issued for his arrest.

Fifi believes Pyne must have orchestrated the frame-up in revenge. She rushes to Pyne's home and accuses him, but he is shocked and denies any involvement. Upon calling his office, Pyne learns the police indeed suspect Jimmy, and he asks Fifi where Jimmy is hiding. Realizing Pyne may be trying to help, Fifi tells him the truth.

Back at the apartment, a scared and combative Jimmy accuses Fifi of betrayal. Pyne questions Jimmy about a phone call he made just before the robbery to a man named Joe Walker. Jimmy reluctantly confirms it. Then, in a defensive outburst, he announces that Fifi is his wife and demands that Pyne stop pursuing her.

Crushed by the news of Fifi's marriage, Pyne leaves. Soon after, it is confirmed that Joe Walker—the man Jimmy phoned—is the actual thief. Fifi confronts Jimmy, who finally confesses to being involved in the plot. Disillusioned and heartbroken, Fifi orders him out of her life and begins the process of divorcing him. She then returns to the theatre, leaving her past behind.

== Cast ==
- Colleen Moore as Betty Murphy / Fifi D'Auray
- Raymond Hackett as Jimmy Willet
- Fredric March as Gregory Pyne
- Virginia Lee Corbin as Claire Floyd
- Mickey Bennett as Call Boy
- Edward Martindel as Chandler Cunnungham
- Adrienne D'Ambricourt as Jo
- Fred Howard as Treasurer (credited as Frederick Howard)
- Sydney Jarvis as Stage Manager
- Cleve Moore as Press Agent
- Andy Rice Jr. as Song Plugger
- Ben Hendricks Jr. as Stage Doorman
- Larry Banthim as Bud Burke
- Earl Bartlett as Trio Leader (uncredited)
- Nora Cecil (uncredited)

== Production background ==
This film was Moore's fourth film under her contract signed February 28, 1929. It followed Smiling Irish Eyes, also with Moore and directed by Seiter.

== Preservation status ==
This is considered a lost film with a lost Vitaphone soundtrack.

== Soundtrack ==
- "If I Can't Have You (If You Can't Have Me)"

Lyric by Al Bryan
Music by George W. Meyer
Copyright 1929 by Remick Music Corporation

- "You Can't Believe My Eyes"

Lyric by Al Bryan
Music by George W. Meyer
Copyright 1929 by Remick Music Corporation

- "Ophelia Will Fool You"

Lyric by Al Bryan
Music by George W. Meyer
Copyright 1929 by Remick Music Corporation

- "Pilly Pom Pom Plee"

Lyric by Al Bryan
Music by George W. Meyer
Copyright 1929 by Remick Music Corporation

== See also ==
- List of early color feature films
- List of lost films

== Footnotes ==
- Jeff Codori (2012), Colleen Moore; A Biography of the Silent Film Star, McFarland Publishing,(Print ISBN 978-0-7864-4969-9, EBook ISBN 978-0-7864-8899-5).
