= Manhattan Moon =

1935 film directed by Stuart Walker

- Directed by: Stuart Walker
- Screenplay by: Barry Trivers; Ben Grauman Kohn
- Story by: Robert Harris
- Produced by: Stanley Bergerman
- Starring: Ricardo Cortez; Dorothy Page
- Cinematography: Charles Stumar
- Edited by: Phil Cahn
- Music by: Score: Karl Hajos; Songs: Karl Hajos (music); Jay Gorney (music); E. Y. Harburg (lyrics); Arthur Morton (music); Barry Trivers (lyrics)
- Production company: Universal Pictures
- Release date: August 5, 1935
- Running time: 65 minutes
- Country: United States
- Language: English

Manhattan Moon is a 1935 American romantic comedy film directed by Stuart Walker and starring Ricardo Cortez and Dorothy Page. It was released on August 5, 1935.

== Cast ==
- Ricardo Cortez as Dan Moore
- Dorothy Page as Yvonne/Doris
- Henry Mollison as Reggie Van Dorset
- Hugh O'Connell as Speed
- Regis Toomey as Eddie
- Adrienne D'Ambricourt as Maid
- Luis Alberni as Luigi)
- Henry Armetta as Tony
- William L'Estrange Millman as Wilbur, secretary
- Irving Bacon as Hot dog man
- Jack Cheatham as Henchman
- Colonel Robinson as Mr. Van Dorset
- Elizabeth Williams as Mrs. Van Dorset
- Rudolph Cornell as Usher
- Jean Perry as Head waiter
- Joe Connors as Dancer
- Evelyn Miller as Tessie
- Lou Seymour as Master of ceremonies
- Earl Eby as Guest
- Marcia Remy as Guest
- John Hall as Theatre doorman
- Lloyd Whitlock as Apartment house manager
- Hal Price as Station announcer
- Corbet Morris as Parker
- Stanley Mack as News photographer
- Jack Gardner as News photographer
- Monte Montague as Policeman
- Jerry Mandy as Vendor
- Harry Mancke as Stage manager
- Paddy O'Flynn as Reporter
- Walter Clinton as Reporter
- Harry Harvey as Reporter
- Don Brodie as Reporter
- Clayton Romler as Dancing partner
- Florence Enright as Dialogue coach
