= Ricardo Cortez =

American actor (1900–1977)

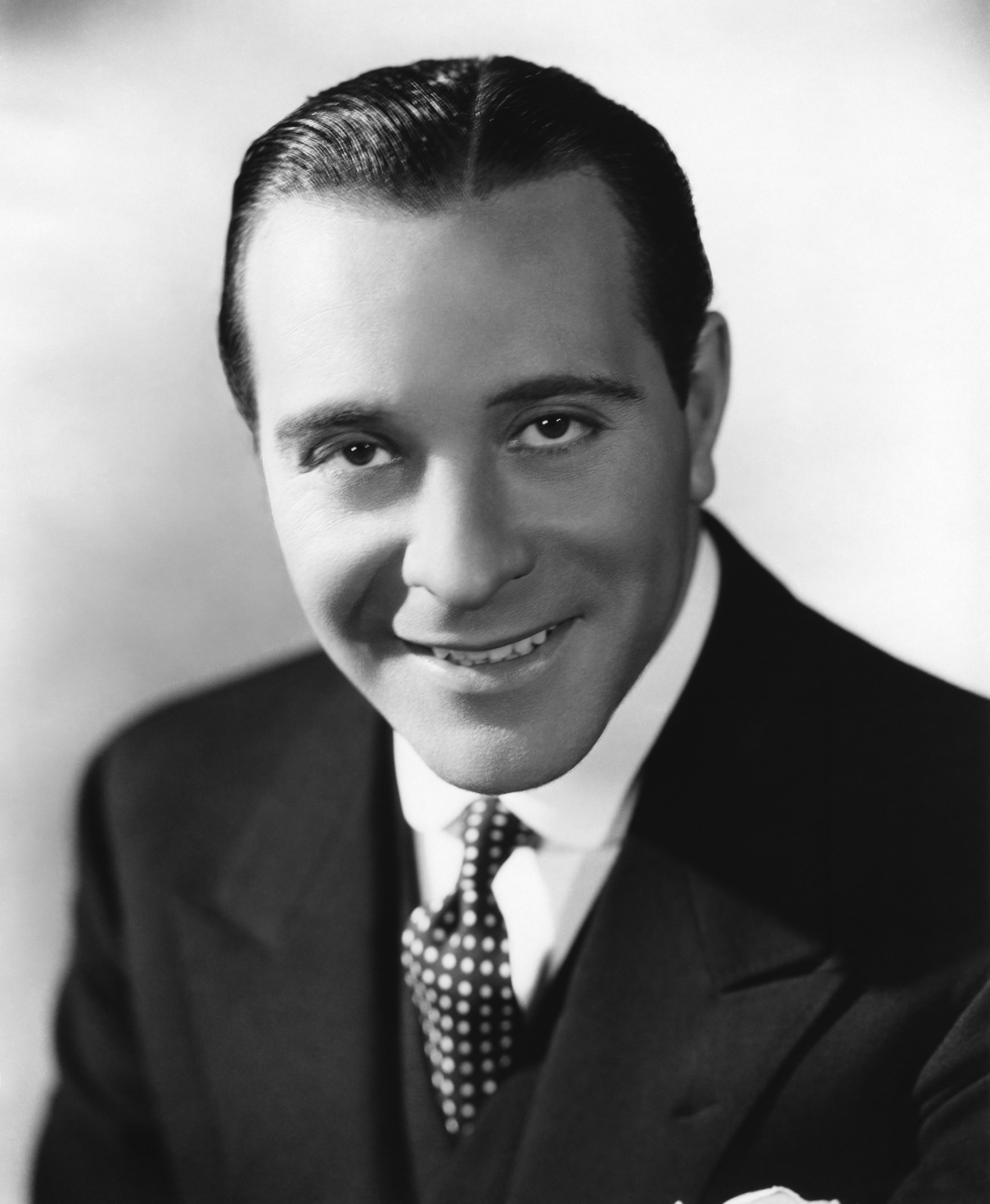
- Cortez in 1935
- Born: Jacob Kranze or Krantz; September 19, 1900; New York City, U.S.
- Died: April 28, 1977 (aged 76); New York City, U.S.
- Resting place: Woodlawn Cemetery, New York City
- Other name: Jack Crane
- Occupations: Actor; film director
- Years active: 1917–1960
- Spouses: Alma Rubens (m. 1926; died 1931) Christine Coniff Lee (m. 1934; div. 1940) Margaret Belle (m. 1950)
- Relatives: Stanley Cortez (brother)

Ricardo Cortez (born Jacob Krantz or Kranze; September 19, 1900 – April 28, 1977) was an American actor and film director. He was a matinée idol during the silent era, and later specialized in playing "heavies".

== Early life ==
Cortez was born Jacob Kranze or Krantz in New York City to Austrian Jewish parents, Sarah (née Lefkovitz) and Morris Kranze or Krantz. Vienna has been incorrectly cited as his birthplace. His younger brother, Stanislaus, later became a prominent cinematographer under the name Stanley Cortez.

He graduated from DeWitt Clinton High School in the Bronx. Prior to entering the film business, he was an amateur boxer and worked on Wall Street as a runner.

== Film career ==
=== Acting ===
Hollywood executives changed his name from Krantz to Cortez to capitalize on his handsome Latin-like features and the popularity of the silent film era's "Latin lovers" such as Rudolph Valentino, Ramon Novarro, Antonio Moreno and Rod La Rocque. When it began to circulate publicly that Cortez was not actually Latino, the studios attempted to pass him off as French before a final Viennese origin story was promoted. He was also credited as Jack Crane early in his acting career.

Cortez appeared in over 100 films. He began his career playing romantic leads, and when sound cinema arrived, his strong delivery and New York accent made him an ideal heavy. While his main focus was character acting, he occasionally was able to play leading men. He played opposite Joan Crawford in Montana Moon (1930), and was the first actor to portray Sam Spade in the original pre-Code version of The Maltese Falcon (1931); the latter film was later overshaded by the 1941 remake with Humphrey Bogart in the lead. He co-starred with Charles Farrell and Bette Davis in The Big Shakedown (1934), and with Al Jolson and Dolores del Río in Wonder Bar (1934). In 1936, Cortez replaced Warren William as Perry Mason in The Case of the Black Cat.

=== Directing ===
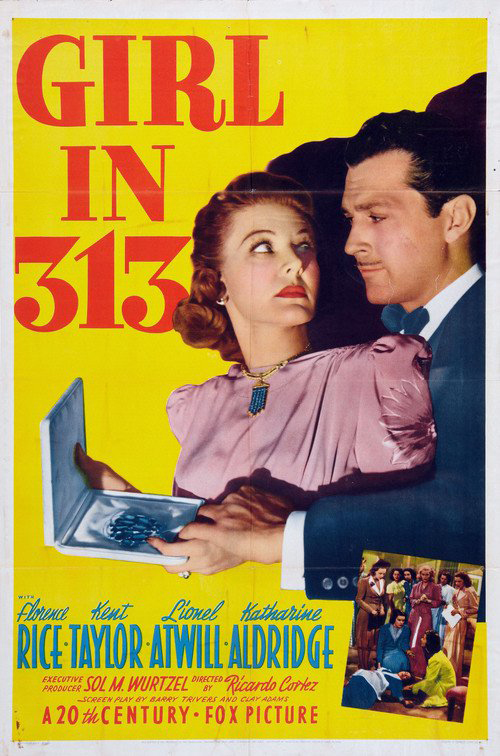
Poster for Girl in 313 (1940)

Cortez directed seven films for 20th Century Fox from 1938 through 1940, all of them "program pictures made on a shoestring for the express purpose of filling the bottom half of the mandatory double bill ..." His first film as director was Inside Story, which was assigned to Cortez in the spring of 1938 but was not released until 1939. He also directed Chasing Danger, The Escape (1939), Heaven with a Barbed Wire Fence (1939), City of Chance (1940), Free, Blonde and 21 (1940), and Girl in 313 (1940).

== Personal life ==
Cortez married silent film actress Alma Rubens on February 8, 1926. They had previously married on January 30, but it was invalid due to Rubens's divorce not being finalized. The couple separated in 1930, and she had sued him for divorce when she died of pneumonia on January 21, 1931. Cortez married Christine Conniff Lee on January 8, 1934, but they divorced in 1940.

After retiring from the film business in the late 1950s, Cortez returned to New York, and began working as a stockbroker for Salomon Brothers on Wall Street.

== Death ==
Cortez died in Doctors Hospital in New York City in 1977 at age 76 and was interred at Woodlawn Cemetery in the Bronx.

== Recognition ==
Cortez has a star at 1500 Vine Street in the Motion Pictures section of the Hollywood Walk of Fame. It was dedicated on February 8, 1960.

== Filmography ==
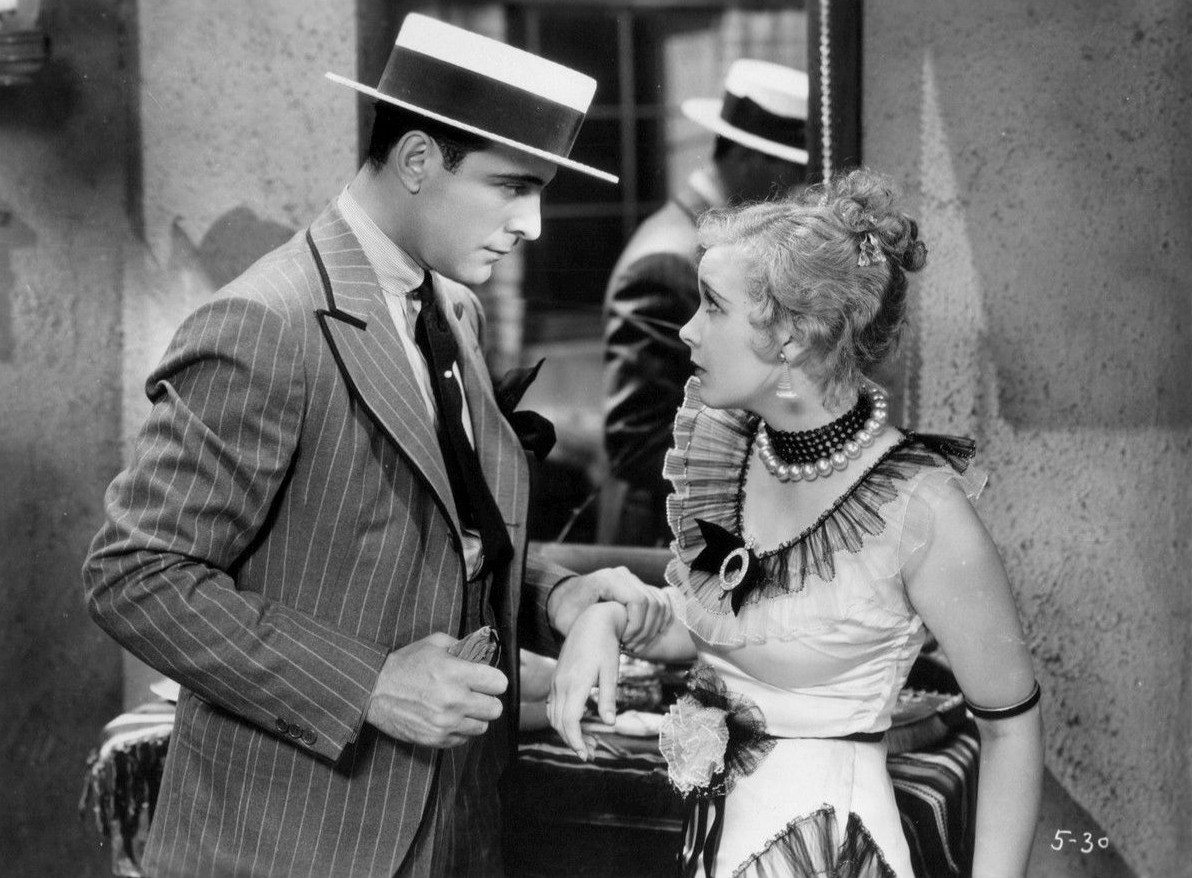
Cortez and Helen Twelvetrees in Her Man (1930)

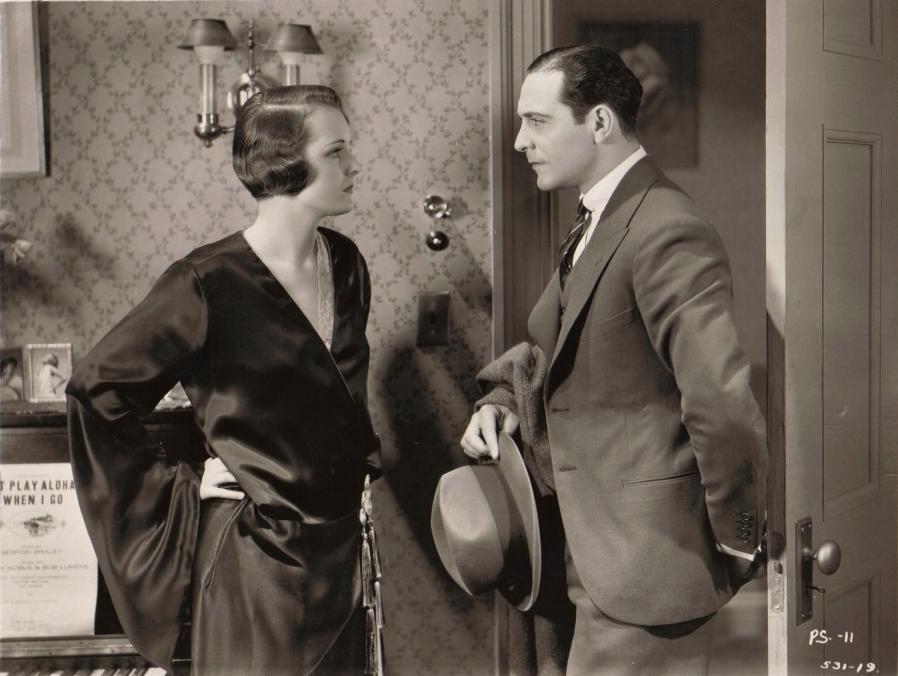
Mary Astor and Cortez in Behind Office Doors (1931)

- The Fringe of Society (1917) (scenes deleted) (film debut)
- The Imp (1919) as Minor Role (uncredited)
- The Gentleman from America (1923) as Minor Role (uncredited)
- Sixty Cents an Hour (1923) as William Davis
- Children of Jazz (1923) as Ted Carter
- Hollywood (1923) as Himself
- The Call of the Canyon (1923) as Larry Morrison
- The Next Corner (1924) as Don Arturo
- A Society Scandal (1924) as Harrison Peters
- The Bedroom Window (1924) as Robert Delano
- The City That Never Sleeps (1924) as Mark Roth
- Feet of Clay (1924) as Tony Channing
- This Woman (1924) as Whitney Duane
- Argentine Love (1924) as Juan Martin
- The Spaniard (1925) as Don Pedro de Barrego
- The Swan (1925) as Dr. Walter, the Tutor
- Not So Long Ago (1925) as Billy Ballard
- In the Name of Love (1925) as Raoul Melnotte
- The Pony Express (1925) as Jack Weston
- Torrent (1926) as Don Rafael Brull
- Volcano! (1926) as Stéphane Séquineau
- The Cat's Pajamas (1926) as Don Cesare Gracco
- The Sorrows of Satan (1926) as Geoffrey Tempest
- The Eagle of the Sea (1926) as Capt. Sazarac
- New York (1927) as Michael Angelo Cassidy
- Mockery (1927) as Captain Dimitri
- By Whose Hand? (1927) as Agent X-9
- The Private Life of Helen of Troy (1927) as Paris
- The Orchid Dancer (1928) as Yoanes Etchegarry dit Jean Barliave
- Ladies of the Night Club (1928) as George Merrill
- Prowlers of the Sea (1928) as Carlos De Neve
- The Grain of Dust (1928) as Fred Norman
- Excess Baggage (1928) as Val D'Errico
- The Gun Runner (1928) as Julio
- The Younger Generation (1929) as Morris Goldfish
- New Orleans (1929) as Jim Morley
- Midstream (1929) as James Stanwood
- The Phantom in the House (1929) as Paul Wallis
- The Lost Zeppelin (1929) as Tom Armstrong
- Montana Moon (1930) as Jeff
- Her Man (1930) as Johnnie
- Illicit (1931) as Price Baines
- Ten Cents a Dance (1931) as Bradley Carlton
- Behind Office Doors (1931) as Ronnie Wales
- White Shoulders (1931) as Lawrence Marchmont
- The Maltese Falcon (1931) as Sam Spade
- Big Business Girl (1931) as Robert J. Clayton
- Transgression (1931) as Don Arturo de Borgus
- Reckless Living (1931) as Curly
- Bad Company (1931) as Goldie Gorio
- Men of Chance (1931) as Johnny Silk
- No One Man (1932) as Bill Hanaway
- Symphony of Six Million (1932) as Dr. Felix 'Felixel' Klauber
- Is My Face Red? (1932) as William Poster
- Thirteen Women (1932) as Police Sergeant Barry Clive
- The Phantom of Crestwood (1932) as Gary Curtis
- Flesh (1932) as Nicky Grant
- Broadway Bad (1933) as Craig Cutting
- Midnight Mary (1933) as Leo Darcy
- Torch Singer (1933) as Tony Cummings
- Big Executive (1933) as Victor Conway
- The House on 56th Street (1933) as Bill Blaine
- The Big Shakedown (1934) as Dutch Barnes
- Mandalay (1934) as Tony Evans
- Wonder Bar (1934) as Harry
- Hat, Coat and Glove (1934) as Robert Mitchell
- The Man with Two Faces (1934) as Ben Weston
- A Lost Lady (1934) as Ellinger
- The Firebird (1934) as Herman Brandt
- I Am a Thief (1934) as Pierre
- The White Cockatoo (1935) as Jim Sundean
- Shadow of Doubt (1935) as Sim Sturdevant
- Manhattan Moon (1935) as Dan Moore
- Special Agent (1935) as Alexander Carston
- Frisco Kid (1935) as Paul Morra
- The Murder of Dr. Harrigan (1936) as George Lambert
- Man Hunt (1936) as Frank Kingman
- The Walking Dead (1936) as Nolan
- Postal Inspector (1936) as Inspector Bill Davis
- The Case of the Black Cat (1936) as Perry Mason
- Talk of the Devil (1936) as Ray Allen
- Her Husband Lies (1937) as J. Ward Thomas
- The Californian (1937) as Ramon Escobar
- West of Shanghai (1937) as Gordon Creed
- City Girl (1938) as Charles Blake
- Mr. Moto's Last Warning (1939) as Fabian
- Charlie Chan in Reno (1939) as Dr. Ainsley
- Murder Over New York (1940) as George Kirby
- Romance of the Rio Grande (1940) as Ricardo de Vega
- A Shot in the Dark (1941) as Philip Richards
- World Premiere (1941) as Mark Saunders
- I Killed That Man (1941) as Roger Phillips
- Who Is Hope Schuyler? (1942) as Anthony Pearce
- Rubber Racketeers (1942) as Gilin
- Tomorrow We Live (1942) as The Ghost, Alexander Caesar Martin
- Make Your Own Bed (1944) as Fritz Alden
- The Inner Circle (1946) as Duke York
- The Locket (1946) as Mr. Bonner
- Blackmail (1947) as Ziggy Cranston
- Mystery in Mexico (1948) as John Norcross
- Bunco Squad (1950) as Tony Weldon - aka Anthony Wells
- The Last Hurrah (1958) as Sam Weinberg (final film)

== Bibliography ==
- Van Neste, Dan. The Magnificent Heel: The Life and Films of Ricardo Cortez. Albany, GA: BearManor Media, 2017. ISBN 978-1-62933-128-7
