= Geymond Vital =

French actor

- Born: Vital Bernard Geymond; 24 January 1897; Claix, Isère, Rhône-Alpes, France
- Died: 6 December 1987 (aged 90); Paris, France
- Occupation: Actor
- Years active: 1924–1975 (film)

Geymond Vital (24 January 1897 – 6 December 1987) was a French film, stage and television actor.

== Filmography ==
Year	Title	Role	Notes
1924	La galerie des monstres		
1926	Destinée	Carlo Strabini	
1927	L'île enchantée	Ferrari	
1928	The Italian Straw Hat	Le lieutenant Tavernier	
1928	Misdeal	Marcellin Maldone	
1929	The Lighthouse Keepers	Yvon Bréhan	
1930	Le masque d'Hollywood	Jimmy Doyle	
1930	Lopez, le bandit	Pancho Lopez	
1931	Le père célibataire		
1931	L'aviateur		
1931	Révolte dans la prison	Dopey	
1931	Spanish Nights	Le marquis de Lupa	
1932	Le Fils de l'autre	Paul Niles / Victor Whitcomb	
1933	The Agony of the Eagles	Le messager de Nantes	
1934	Rapt	Firmin	
1936	Royal Waltz	René	
1936	The Gardens of Murcia	Pencho	
1937	Double Crime in the Maginot Line	Lieutenant Le Guenn	
1938	L'Étrange Monsieur Victor	Petit rôle	Uncredited
1938	La Piste du sud	Braun	
1938	Education of a Prince	Le général Braoulitch	
1939	The Five Cents of Lavarede	Le policier	
1944	First on the Rope	Maxime Vouillaz	
1946	Le bateau à soupe	Pedro	
1947	A Cop	Daniel	
1949	Doctor Laennec	Dr. Pierre Bayle	
1949	Cage of Girls	Pierre Mansois, oncle de Micheline	
1950	Le Crime des justes	Monsieur Combaroux	
1955	Blackmail	L'avocat de la partie civile	
1956	Law of the Streets		
1958	Maigret Sets a Trap	Un journaliste	Uncredited
1958	Prisons de femmes		
1959	Too Late to Love	Maître Augier - l'avocat général	
1960	The Baron of the Locks	La Ramée	Uncredited
1961	The Count of Monte Cristo	Himself	
1964	Diary of a Chambermaid	Le brigadier sur le quai de la gare	
1964	Angélique, Marquise des Anges	Le père Kirscher	Uncredited
1967	Le Crime de David Levinstein	Le grand-père	

== Bibliography ==
- Goble, Alan. The Complete Index to Literary Sources in Film. Walter de Gruyter, 1999.
