= The Next Corner =

1924 film by Sam Wood

- Daybill poster
- Directed by: Sam Wood
- Written by: Monte Katterjohn (screenplay)
- Based on: The Next Corner by Kate Jordan
- Produced by: Adolph Zukor; Jesse J. Lasky
- Starring: Dorothy Mackaill; Lon Chaney; Conway Tearle; Louise Dresser; Ricardo Cortez
- Cinematography: Alfred Gilks
- Production company: Famous Players–Lasky
- Distributed by: Paramount Pictures
- Release date: February 18, 1924
- Running time: 70 minutes
- Country: United States
- Language: Silent (English intertitles)

The Next Corner is a 1924 American silent romantic melodrama film directed by Sam Wood. The film starred Dorothy Mackaill and Lon Chaney. Based on the romance novel of the same name by Kate Jordan, the film was produced by Famous Players–Lasky and distributed by Paramount Pictures.

Throughout the years, The Next Corner has been cited as a Chaney picture but, according to the American Film Institute Catalog, his character has little screen time. In fact, of all Chaney's feature films of the 1920s, this picture seems to have less of him on screen than any other feature he made. A still exists showing Chaney in his role as Juan Serafin and it shows how little makeup he wore in this picture. Another still of Chaney can be seen here.

This film was one of Chaney's only 2 Paramount film of the 1920s, the last having been Treasure Island, and was one of the last films he appeared in as a freelance artist before signing a multiple picture deal with Metro-Goldwyn-Mayer.

The leading character is portrayed by Dorothy Mackaill, then an up-and-coming young star. The novel was remade in sound in 1931 at RKO as Transgression starring Kay Francis and Nance O'Neil, with Ricardo Cortez returning to the same role.

== Plot ==
Elsie Maury and her wealthy American husband Robert spend their honeymoon in Paris, where she becomes acquainted with the smarmy Don Arturo, who plots to seduce her. When her husband rushes off to Argentina on a business trip, she and her mother remain in Paris to await his return. Elsie accept an invitation to attend a house party that is to held at Don Arturo's home. She is accompanied only by Juan Serafin, one of Arturo's aides, and when she arrives, she is surprised to find they are the only guests. Don Arturo attempts to seduce her, but before she succumbs to his charms, she is compelled to write a letter addressed to her husband in which she confesses that she and Arturo are now lovers.

Before the letter can be mailed however, Don Arturo manages to open the envelope and substitute two sheets of blank paper in place of the letter, and then reseal it again. Soon after, a stranger arrives at the house and shoots Don Arturo dead for having seduced his peasant daughter on an earlier occasion. Elsie, thinking the letter was mailed, returns to Paris and tells her mother to help her intercept the missive. Juan Serafin, thinking his master's death was Elsie's fault, takes it upon himself to maliciously deliver the letter to Robert in person.

Elsie feels she has no choice but to come clean now, and confesses the whole affair to her husband. But when he opens the envelope, all he finds are the two blank sheets of paper that Don Arturo had substituted. He forgives Elsie nonetheless and embraces her. Later Juan Serafin is found shot to death, clutching one of Elsie's handkerchiefs in his hand.

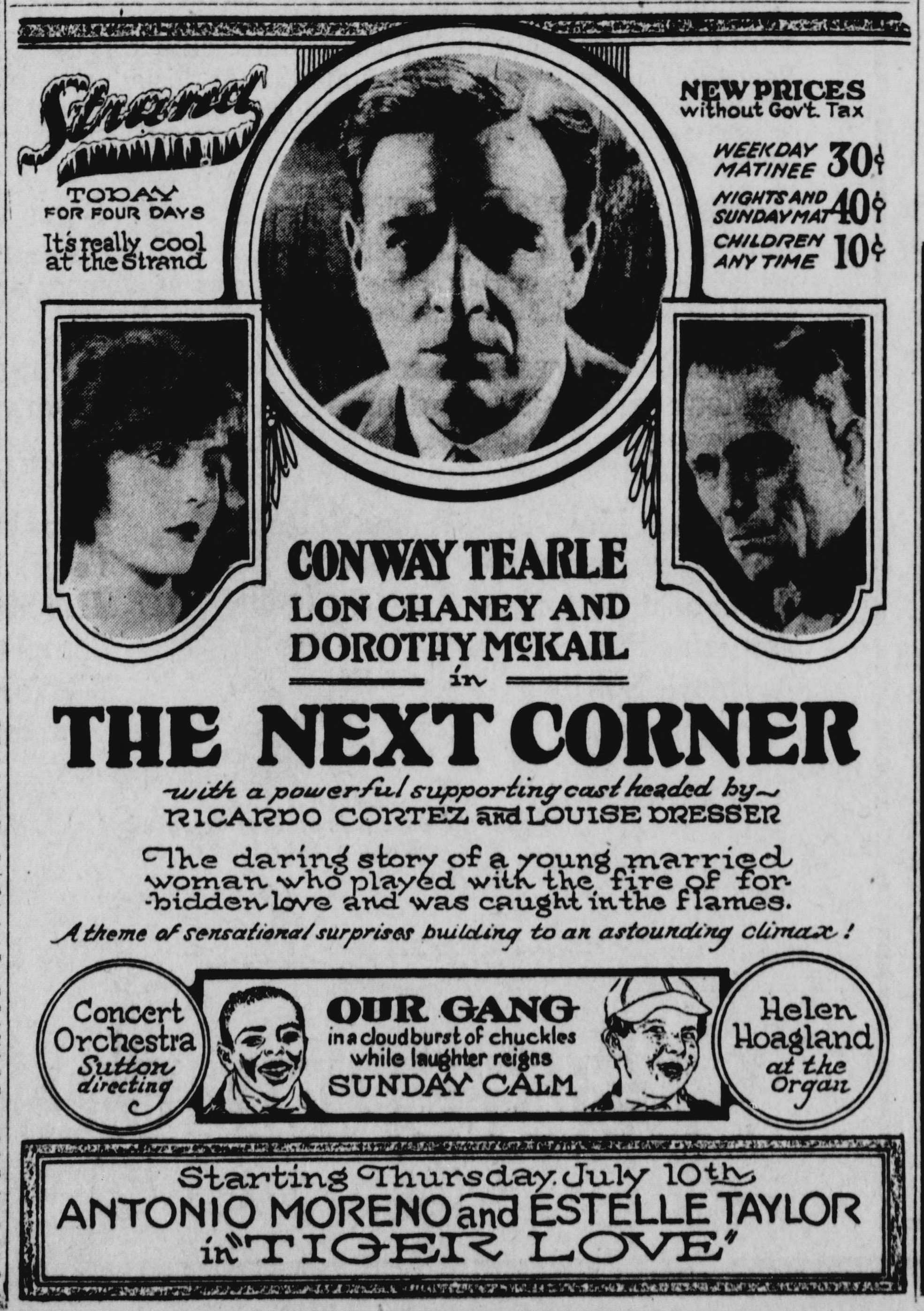
Contemporary advertisement

== Cast ==
- Conway Tearle as Robert Maury
- Lon Chaney as Juan Serafin
- Dorothy Mackaill as Elsie Maury
- Ricardo Cortez as Don Arturo
- Louise Dresser as Elsie's mother
- Remea Radzina as Countess Longueval
- Dorothy Cumming as Paula Vrain
- Bertha Feducha as Julie, Elsie's maid
- Bernard Siegel as The Stranger

== Critical Comments ==
"Old fashioned in theme and characterization and conventional in treatment is this picture which carries very little entertaining qualities. Any faithful filmgoer will recognize the plot as belonging to a threadbare formula--one which has done yeoman service on the screen. The best feature of the picture is Dorothy Mackaill's vital performance...Conway Tearle as the husband and Ricardo Cortez as the other man are also effective, while Lon Chaney's personality is buried in a small role...It is a finely mounted production, but the story is weak." ---Motion Picture News

"Well it was fearfully cold and the radio must have been good, as we had no crowd at all to see this one, and we were glad, as it is a very poor show. Lay off. Poor audience appeal." ---Moving Picture World

"An unintentionally funny melodrama which may amuse but will not impress intelligent audiences...Why Lon Chaney consented to appear in such a foolish role as that of foster-brother Serafin remains an unsolved problem." ---Exhibitors Trade Review

"Slow draggy development and poor direction....Lon Chaney's great ability is completely lost in this". ---Film Daily

"Just a programme picture, that's all... Conway Tearle and Lon Chaney have little to do". ---Photoplay

"(The film) has a silly story. Lon Chaney has a weak part and gets into the fore now and then in subordinate situations where he has very little to build on". ---Variety

== Preservation ==
With no copies of The Next Corner located in any film archives, it is a lost film.

== Taglines ==
"THE story of a youthful wife who couldn't discern between real and artificial love. And paid in heartache and remorse to learn. It's a big theme, powerfully told."

"The daring story of a young married woman who played with the fire of forbiiden love and was caught in the flames!.... A theme of sensational surprise building to an astounding climax!" (one-sheet blurb)

"Lover or Husband... Which? The story of a wife who strayed!" (one-sheet blurb)
