= Adrienne D'Ambricourt =

American actress

- Born: Adrienne Dumontier; 2 June 1878; Paris, France
- Died: 6 December 1957 (aged 79); Hollywood, California, U.S.
- Occupation: Actress
- Years active: 1924–1957

Adrienne D'Ambricourt (born Adrienne Dumontier; 2 June 1878 – 6 December 1957) was a French-American actress of the silent and sound film eras. She was born in Paris, and emigrated to the United States after the end of World War I.

== Biography ==
A member of the Comédie-Française who had also performed at the Théâtre Sarah-Bernhardt, D'Ambricourt made her American acting debut in the 1922 Gershwin Broadway musical comedy, The French Doll, in which she had one of the main roles, "Baroness Mazulier". She made her film debut in the 1924 silent film, The Humming Bird, where she was one of Gloria Swanson's gang of thieves who turned into resistance fighters in World War I.

With the advent of talking pictures, and before dubbing came into general use, D'Ambricourt was used in several films which were the French version of English language ones, such as Quand on est belle (The Easiest Way — 1931), L'énigmatique Mr. Parkes (Slightly Scarlet — 1930), and Nuit d'Espagne (Transgression — 1931).

She appeared in over 70 films, including such classics as Casablanca, San Francisco, and To Have And Have Not, until about 1947, after which her film career began to decline. Her final role was in George Cukor's Les Girls, starring Gene Kelly and Mitzi Gaynor, in which she played the wardrobe woman. With the advent of television, she appeared in several series during the 1950s, working right up to her death.

== Person life and death ==
D'Ambricourt had a son, Jean Dumontier, who was also an actor.

On December 6, 1957, D'Ambricourt suffered a fatal heart attack while driving in Hollywood.

== Filmography ==
(Per AFI database)

- The Humming Bird (1924)
- Wages of Virtue (1924)
- God Gave Me Twenty Cents (1927)
- Footlights and Fools (1929)
- Our Modern Maidens (1929)
- The Trial of Mary Dugan (1929)
- The Bad One (1930)
- What a Widow! (1930)
- L'énigmatique Mr. Parkes (1930)
- El proceso de Mary Dugan (1931)
- Spanish Nights (1931)
- Nuit d'Espagne (1931)
- Quand on est belle (1931)
- Jenny Lind (1931)
- Svengali (1931)
- Reaching for the Moon (1931)
- Transgression (1931)
- This Modern Age (1931)
- Men in Her Life (1931)
- Le procès de Mary Dugan (1931)
- Primavera en otoño (1933)
- L'amour guide (1933)
- The Eagle and the Hawk (1933)
- Disgraced! (1933)
- The Secret of Madame Blanche (1933)
- Design for Living (1933)
- La veuve joyeuse (1934)
- Gallant Lady (1934)
- The Cat and the Fiddle (1934)
- All Men Are Enemies (1934) (uncredited)
- Stingaree (1934)
- Peter Ibbetson (1935)
- Goin' to Town (1935)
- It Happened in New York (1935)
- Manhattan Moon (1935)
- Sylvia Scarlett (1936)
- Valiant Is the Word for Carrie (1936)
- San Francisco (1936)
- The Great Ziegfeld (1936)
- Suzy (1936)
- Mama Steps Out (1937)
- Live, Love and Learn (1937)
- Seventh Heaven (1937)
- We Have Our Moments (1937)
- Artists and Models Abroad (1938)
- I'll Give a Million (1938)
- City in Darkness (1939)
- The Story of Vernon and Irene Castle (1939)
- Bulldog Drummond's Bride (1939)
- Pack Up Your Troubles (1939)
- Two Girls on Broadway (1940)
- Forty Little Mothers (1940)
- Joan of Paris (1942)
- The Pied Piper (1942)
- Casablanca (1942)
- The White Cliffs of Dover (1944)
- Experiment Perilous (1944)
- Passage to Marseille (1944)
- The Song of Bernadette (1945)
- To Have and Have Not (1945)
- Paris-Underground (1945)
- This Love of Ours (1945)
- What Next, Corporal Hargrove? (1945)
- Saratoga Trunk (1946)
- The Return of Monte Cristo (1946)
- So Dark the Night (1946)
- Calcutta (1947)
- Beautiful Love (1951)
- Bal Tabarin (1952)
- Million Dollar Mermaid (1952)
- The Purple Mask (1955)
- Les Girls (1957)
