= The Gardens of Murcia (1936 film) =

- Directed by: Marcel Gras; Max Joly
- Written by: Josep Feliu i Codina (play); Max Joly; Marcel Gras
- Produced by: Marcel Gras
- Starring: Juanita Montenegro; Hubert Prélier; Geymond Vital
- Cinematography: Nicolas Hayer
- Music by: Jean Poueigh; Allan Small
- Release date: 28 November 1936
- Running time: 77 minutes
- Country: France
- Language: French

The Gardens of Murcia (French: Aux jardins de Murcie) is a 1936 French drama film directed by Marcel Gras and Max Joly and starring Juanita Montenegro, Hubert Prélier and Geymond Vital. It was also known by the alternative title of Heritage. A 1923 silent film The Gardens of Murcia had earlier been made, based on the same story.

== Cast ==
- Juanita Montenegro as Maria del Carmen
- Hubert Prélier as Xavier
- Geymond Vital as Pencho
- Nicolas Amato
- Albert Angeli as Pepuso
- Marcel Charvey
- Jean Clairval
- Irma d'Argy
- Henry Darbray
- Marcel Delaître as Domingo
- Mona Dol
- Annette Doria as Fuensantica
- Geno Ferny
- L.E. Hemme
- Edmée Landauer
- Raymond Marcel
- Georges Mauloy as Le médecin
- André Pierrel
- Annie Toinon

== Bibliography ==
- Crisp, Colin. Genre, Myth and Convention in the French Cinema, 1929-1939. Indiana University Press, 2002.
