= The Gardens of Murcia (1923 film) =

1923 French film

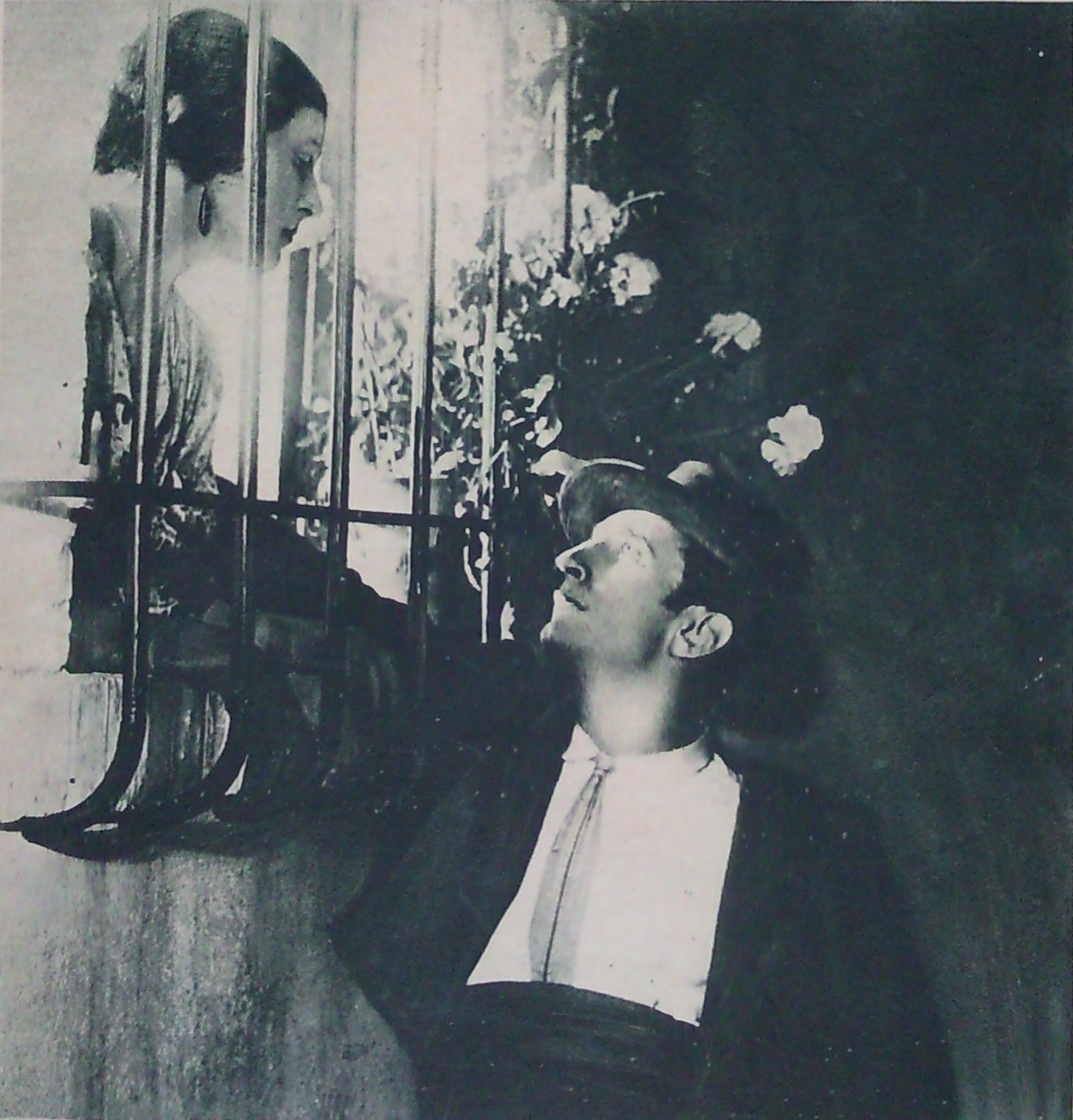
- Directed by: René Hervil; Louis Mercanton
- Written by: Josep Feliú i Codina (play); Carlos Lavergne
- Starring: Arlette Marchal; Pierre Daltour; Pierre Blanchar
- Cinematography: Raymond Agnel
- Production company: Société des Films Mercanton
- Distributed by: Exclusivité Aubert
- Release date: 19 October 1923
- Country: France
- Languages: Silent; French intertitles

The Gardens of Murcia (French: Aux jardins de Murcie) is a 1923 French silent film directed by René Hervil and Louis Mercanton and starring Arlette Marchal, Pierre Daltour and Pierre Blanchar. It was remade in 1936.

== Cast ==
- Arlette Marchal as Maria del Carmen
- Pierre Daltour as Pancho
- Pierre Blanchar as Xavier
- Max Maxudian as Domingo
- Ginette Maddie as Fuensantieu
- Pâquerette as Conception
- Louis Monfils as Ardon
- Jeanne Bérangère as Vieille femme
- Francis Simonin

== Bibliography ==
- Ian Aitken. Realist Film Theory and Cinema: The Nineteenth-Century Lukácsian and Intuitionist Realist Traditions. Manchester University Press, 2006.
