= Spanish Nights (film) =

1931 film

- Directed by: Henri de la Falaise
- Produced by: William LeBaron
- Starring: Jeanne Helbling; Rose Dione; Geymond Vital
- Production company: RKO Radio Pictures
- Distributed by: RKO Radio Pictures
- Release date: 1931
- Country: United States
- Language: French

Spanish Nights (French:Nuit d'Espagne) is a 1931 American Pre-Code drama film directed by Henri de la Falaise and starring Jeanne Helbling, Rose Dione and Geymond Vital. It is the French-language version of Transgression, with only Adrienne D'Ambricourt appearing in both films.

== Cast ==
- Jeanne Helbling as Elsie Maury
- Rose Dione as Paula Vrain
- Geymond Vital as Le marquis de Lupa
- Jean Delmour as Robert Maury
- Marcelle Corday as Undetermined Role
- Adrienne D'Ambricourt as Julie

== Bibliography ==
- Harry Waldman & Anthony Slide. Hollywood and the Foreign Touch: A Dictionary of Foreign Filmmakers and Their Films from America, 1910-1995. Scarecrow Press, 1996.
