= The Phantom in the House =

1929 film by Phil Rosen

- Directed by: Phil Rosen
- Written by: Andrew Soutar (novel); Arthur Hoerl (adaptation); Arthur Hoerl (screenplay)
- Produced by: Trem Carr
- Starring: See below
- Cinematography: Herbert Kirkpatrick
- Music by: Maceo Pinkard; Abner Silver
- Production company: Trem Carr Productions
- Distributed by: Continental Talking Pictures
- Release dates: November 1, 1929; December 1, 1929 (silent version)
- Running time: 64 minutes
- Country: United States
- Language: English

The Phantom in the House (1929)

The Phantom in the House is a 1929 American pre-Code talking film directed by Phil Rosen and starring Ricardo Cortez. A silent version was prepared for release in theatres not yet equipped for sound.

This is a surviving film in a European archive and is available on home video.

== Cast ==
- Ricardo Cortez as Paul Wallis
- Nancy Welford as Dorothy Milburn
- Henry B. Walthall as Boyd Milburn
- Grace Valentine as Peggy Milburn
- Jack Curtis as "Biffer" Bill
- Thomas A. Curran as Judge Thompson
- John Beck
- John Elliott as Police Captain
- Larry Steers
- Henry Roquemore

== See also ==
- List of early sound feature films (1926–1929)
