= A Millionaire for Christy =

1951 film by George Marshall

- Film poster
- Directed by: George Marshall
- Written by: Ken Englund
- Story by: Robert Harari
- Produced by: Bert E. Friedlob
- Starring: Fred MacMurray; Eleanor Parker; Richard Carlson; Una Merkel; Chris-Pin Martin; Douglass Dumbrille; Kay Buckley
- Cinematography: Harry Stradling Sr.
- Edited by: Daniel Mandell
- Music by: Victor Young
- Production company: Thor Productions Inc.
- Distributed by: Twentieth Century-Fox
- Release dates: September 12, 1951 (Cleveland); October 4, 1951 (New York)
- Running time: 91 minutes
- Country: United States
- Language: English
- Box office: $1 million (U.S. rentals)

A Millionaire for Christy is a 1951 American screwball comedy film directed by George Marshall and starring Fred MacMurray, Eleanor Parker and Richard Carlson. The producer was Parker's husband Bert Friedlob.

== Plot ==
Christabel "Christy" Sloane is a legal secretary in San Francisco who desires finer things but is in desperate financial straits. She laments to her coworker Patsy that she needs to marry a millionaire. Christy's boss sends her to Los Angeles to inform Peter Ulysses Lockwood of an inheritance of 28 million pesos ($2 million) that a deceased uncle has bequeathed him and to obtain the necessary legal documents. Patsy sees the assignment as Christy's opportunity and counsels her to romance Peter before informing him of his good fortune. Peter is the "Sunshine Man," the host of a radio program on which he delivers saccharine homilies and moral tales about "spreading the sunshine around", often linked to the products of his sponsors. Christy arrives on Peter's wedding day as he is dressing in preparation to marry heiress June Chandler.

When Christy meets Peter, she is attracted to him and faints in his arms. Peter, half-dressed and baffled by Christy's appearance, carries her to his bed. Christy awakens and acts seductively, but Peter believes that she is mentally unstable. His friend and best man, psychiatrist Roland "Doc" Cook, June's former boyfriend, enters and assumes that Peter is having one last fling before his marriage. While Christy is explaining the purpose of her visit from his bathroom, Peter is in the living room trying to explain the truth to Doc and does not hear her.

Christy follows Peter and Doc to the Chandler mansion, where the wedding is to take place. Doc refuses to participate in the wedding, and Christy inadvertently gives the impression that she is Peter's girlfriend whom he has abandoned for June. Christy's erratic behavior and insistence that Peter has inherited a fortune convince everyone that she is unbalanced. The wedding is postponed until Peter can clear himself by driving Christy to Doc's clinic in La Jolla to confirm her instability. During the foggy ride, Peter drives off the highway onto a beach, where he loses the car keys. He and Christy are found by a group of Mexican railroad workers, who mistake them for newlyweds and welcome them into their crew car. After a night of dancing and drinking with the Mexicans, Peter and Christy kiss in the moonlight. In the morning, Peter apologizes to Christy for making advances as the car is being towed to La Jolla.

Christy explains everything to Doc and confirms the truth with her boss. Hoping to regain June for himself and match Peter with Christy, Doc conspires with her to fake her false illness for 24 hours while he tricks Peter into letting her down gently to cure her. Doc places Peter in his room and registers Christy at the same hotel. He summons June, who finds Peter and Christy in a romantic moment. Doc persuades June that Peter was just following his recommended therapy. Doc and Christy drink in the hotel bar and then approach Peter and June to share their bottle of tequila. After several drinks, Peter, still believing that he is humoring Christy, pledges his entire inheritance to charity, including Doc's clinic.

The next morning, a hung-over Peter is awakened by the press and a stream of well-wishers, all congratulating him on his generosity. Upon learning that he really did inherit $2 million and has donated it all, Peter is dumbfounded and believes that he owes Christy an apology for thinking that she was crazy. June angrily warns him not to see Christy again, but he knocks on Christy's door, only to see her leaving. Peter chases her to a train station, where she hides in the restroom. Peter declares his love for her and forces her to emerge by creating smoke from burning newspapers. They escape the pursuing police and reporters by jumping aboard a train carrying their Mexican friends.

== Cast ==
- Fred MacMurray as Peter Ulysses Lockwood
- Eleanor Parker as Christabel "Christy" Sloane
- Richard Carlson as Dr. Roland "Doc" Cook
- Una Merkel as Patsy Clifford
- Chris-Pin Martin as Manolo
- Douglass Dumbrille as A.K. Thompson
- Kay Buckley as June Chandler
- Raymond Greenleaf as Benjamin Chandler
- Nestor Paiva as Mr. Rapello
- Jo-Carroll Dennison as Nurse Jackson (uncredited)

== Production ==
The film's working titles were The Golden Goose and No Room for the Groom, which was deemed too similar to the title of Bing Crosby's upcoming feature Here Comes the Groom. The title was announced as A Millionaire for Christy in May 1951.

== Release ==
The film's world premiere was held at the Hippodrome Theater in Eleanor Parker's hometown of Cleveland, Ohio on September 12, 1951. Parker embarked on a week-long promotional tour preceding the premiere, with appearances in the Ohio cities of Cincinnati, Dayton, Toledo and Cleveland. She was granted one week of leave from the production of Scaramouche for the tour and premiere, a condition that she had stipulated in her contract.

== Reception ==
In a contemporary review for The New York Times, critic A. H. Weiler wrote: "Since 'A Millionaire for Christy' is as explicit as its title, it is only fair to warn audiences that this slapstick comedy is closer to Mack Sennet [sic] than it is to Will Shakespeare. Bert E. Friedlob, the independent producer; George Marshall, the director; the scenarist and the cast have thrown caution to the winds and never pull their punches. As a result, the antic ... is, despite the transparency of its plot and the broad histrionics of the players, who seem to be having a good time, too, an infectious trifle, which is as harmless and palatable as a bon bon."
