= Henry de La Falaise =

French-American film director

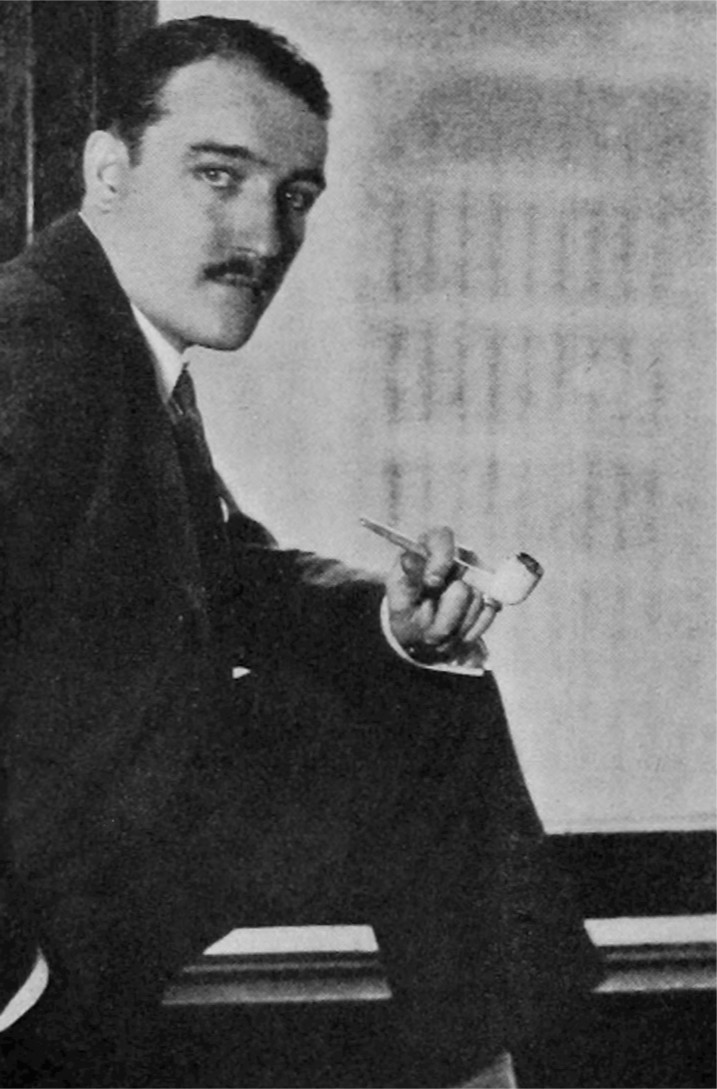
- de La Falaise at his New York office in 1927
- Born: James Henri Le Bailly de la Falaise; February 11, 1898; Saint Cyr, France
- Died: April 10, 1972 (aged 74)
- Title: Marquis de La Coudraye
- Spouses: Gloria Swanson (m. 1925; div. 1931) Constance Bennett (m. 1931; div. 1940) Emma Rodríguez Restrepo de Roeder (m. 1940)
- Awards: Croix de Guerre (World War I); Croix de Guerre (World War II)

Henry de La Falaise, Marquis de La Coudraye (born James Henri Le Bailly de la Falaise; February 11, 1898 – April 10, 1972), was a French nobleman, translator, film director, film producer, sometime actor, and war hero who was best known for his high-profile marriages to two leading Hollywood actresses.

== Early life ==
James Henri Le Bailly de la Falaise was born on February 11, 1898, in Saint-Cyr-l'École, France, the eldest son and second child of Louis Venant Gabriel Le Bailly de la Falaise, écuyer (1866–1910), a three time Olympic gold-medallist in fencing and former Army officer. His mother was the former Henriette Lucie Frédérique Hennessy (1873–1965), scion of the Cognac family. After his father died in 1910, his widowed mother married her second husband, Count Antoine Hocquart de Turtot (1872–1954), a cavalry officer and major French horse-racing figure, in 1912. His mother and father had four children together:

- Louise Le Bailly de La Falaise (1894–1910)
- Henri James Le Bailly de La Falaise, Écuyer (1898–1972), film director and producer, war hero and translator.
- Alain Le Bailly de La Falaise, Écuyer (1905–1977). He was the first husband of fashion model Maxime de la Falaise (1922—2009) and the father of fashion muse/designer Loulou de la Falaise.
- Richard Le Bailly de La Falaise, Écuyer (1910—died at Buchenwald in 1945)

His mother had another child with her second husband, de La Falaise's half-sibling

- Henriette-Hyacinthe-Olympe-Geneviève Hocquart de Turtot (born c. 1913).

=== Title ===
The title held by the head of the family, Marquis de La Coudraye, dating from 1707, was granted, by an 1876 act of succession, to the younger son of Pacôme-François Le Bailly, Seigneur de La Falaise, and his wife, Pauline-Louise-Victoire de Loynes, daughter of the Marquis de La Coudraye. La Falaise inherited the title of Marquis de La Coudraye from his paternal grandfather, Gabriel-César-Henri Le Bailly de La Falaise, who, like his father, died in 1910 (the father died on April 4, the grandfather on August 6).

Since La Falaise had no children, the title of Marquis de La Coudraye was inherited by his younger brother, Alain de La Falaise (died 1977). It then passed to his nephew, Alexis de La Falaise (died 2004). It is now held by his grand-nephew (grandson of Alain), Daniel de La Falaise, a professional chef and food writer.

=== Name ===
His actual surname was Le Bailly, though he and other members of his family used Le Bailly de la Falaise, referring to an ancestral estate; it is typically abbreviated to de la Falaise. As the marquis told The New York Times (October 7, 1925), "My patronymic name is Le Bailly, but ... I use the name de la Falaise because it is one of the great-grandfather branches of the Le Bailly family. De La Falaise is the only existing branch of that family today. So this should be my entire name: James Henry Le Bailly de La Falaise, Marquis de La Coudraye".

== Military service ==
The Marquis de La Coudraye was awarded the Croix de Guerre for heroism during World War I, during which time he was attached to the 70th Division of the American Expeditionary Forces. He received Croix de Guerre for bravery during World War II, while he was attached to the British 12th Royal Lancers. In 1943, La Falaise published "Through Hell to Dunkirk" (Military Service Publishing Company), a memoir of his war experiences.

Universally known as "Hank", the marquis was admiringly described by the actress Lillian Gish as "a real war hero. In his bathing-suit he presents a graphic picture of what modern warfare does to a man – he is so cut-and-shot and covered with scars."

== Career ==
La Falaise directed at least five motion pictures, notably among them are two travelogue drama silent films about primitive life and customs: Kliou, the Killer (1934, released 1936, also known as Kliou, the Killer Tiger) although the disparity in the titling remains unknown even today, and Legong: Dance of the Virgins (1933, released 1935, also known as Djanger: Love Rite of Bali). The latter production was described many years later as a "seductive blend of serious documentary, lyrical effusion and unbridled prurience". He may also have written a film script for Gloria Swanson, his first wife, called Paris Luck, a 1927 work that bore the name of Robert Bailly. He also served as the U.S. representative for Pathé, the French film studio. They were the last mainstream silent films shot by a major Hollywood studio.

La Falaise also produced and directed three films for RKO, which were filmed in French and English versions: Échec Au Roi (The Royal Bed) (an adaptation of Robert E. Sherwood's play The Queen's Husband); Le fils d'autre (The Woman Between), and Nuit d'Espagne (Transgression).

== Marriages ==
La Falaise was married three times, but did not have any children. His wives were:

- Gloria Swanson (1899–1983), American movie actress. They married in Paris, France, on January 28, 1925, after meeting on the set of the Swanson film Madame Sans-Gêne, on which La Falaise was working as a translator. Swanson conceived a child with La Falaise before their marriage, but had an abortion because, as The New York Times noted, in 2004, "if she had given birth seven months after her marriage, her career would have been ruined". During their marriage La Falaise was employed as the California representative of Peugeot American Corp., the U.S. branch of the European automobile manufacturer. They were officially divorced in November 1931, at which time Swanson was several months pregnant by Michael Farmer, an Irish sportsman, who would become her fourth husband. (Thinking her divorce from La Falaise was already finalized, the actress had married Farmer in August, which was technically bigamy, and was forced to remarry him, legally, in November.)
- Constance Bennett (1904–1965), American movie actress, whom he married in November 1931, days after his divorce from Swanson was finalized. With her, he founded Bennett Productions, a film company for which he directed Legong: Dance of the Virgin (the first color movie filmed in Bali and the last of Hollywood's silent films) and Kliou the Killer (filmed in present-day Vietnam and the last movie made in two-tone Technicolor). Bennett and La Falaise divorced in 1940.
- Emma "Emmita" Rodríguez Restrepo de Roeder (1940-his death 1972), a Colombian socialite, whose father had been a diplomat.

Titles of nobility (France)
Preceded by Gabriel Le Bailly de La Falaise	Marquis de La Coudraye; 1910–1972	Succeeded by Alain Le Bailly de La Falaise
