= Teala Loring =

American actress

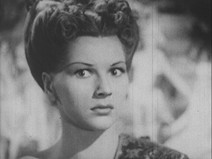
- Born: Marcia Eloise Griffin; October 6, 1922; Denver, Colorado, U.S.
- Died: January 28, 2007 (aged 84); Spring, Texas, U.S.
- Other name: Judith Gibson
- Occupation: Film actress
- Years active: 1942–1950
- Spouse: Eugene Pickler (m. 1950)
- Children: 6
- Relatives: Debra Paget (sister); Lisa Gaye (sister)

Teala Loring (born Marcia Eloise Griffin; October 6, 1922 – January 28, 2007) was an American actress who appeared in over 30 films during the 1940s.

== Life and career ==
Born in Denver, Colorado, she was the sister of actors Debra Paget, Lisa Gaye, and Ruell Shayne. Her mother was Marguerite Gibson, who entertained in nightclubs and vaudeville. At the start of her film career, she was credited as Judith Gibson.

Beginning in 1942, Loring appeared in uncredited or bit parts in films at Paramount, turning up as a cigarette girl in Holiday Inn and as a telephone operator in Double Indemnity, for example.

From 1945 to 1947, she appeared in 10 films released by the low-key Poverty Row studio Monogram Pictures, including Fall Guy (1947), and costarring in two films starring Kay Francis, Allotment Wives (1945) and Wife Wanted (1946).

Of her portrayal of a young mother caught up in an illegal adoption scheme in 1945's Black Market Babies, The New York Times noted that Loring and co-star Maris Wrixon "struggle fitfully with the lines accorded the two principal mothers" in what it called an "uninspired minor melodrama". Having failed to achieve the success that sister Paget would capture in the 1950s, Loring made her final film, Arizona Cowboy (supporting Western star Rex Allen in his screen debut), in 1950.

== Death ==
Loring died at the age of 84 in January 2007 from injuries she sustained in an automobile accident in Spring, Texas. She was survived by her husband, Eugene Pickler (October 16, 1914 – November 23, 2014), and their six children.

Loring and her husband, a staff sergeant in the U.S. Army during World War II, are interred at Houston National Cemetery.

== Selected filmography ==
- Sweethearts of the U.S.A. (1944)
- Return of the Ape Man (1944)
- I Love a Soldier (1944)
- Dark Alibi (1946)
- Gas House Kids (1946)
- Partners in Time (1946)
- Bowery Bombshell (1946)
- Riding the California Trail (1947)
- The Arizona Cowboy (1950)
