= Fall Guy (1947 film) =

1947 film by Reginald LeBorg

- Theatrical release poster
- Directed by: Reginald LeBorg
- Screenplay by: Jerry Warner; John O'Dea
- Based on: Novel: Cocaine by Cornell Woolrich
- Produced by: Walter Mirisch
- Starring: Leo Penn; Robert Armstrong; Teala Loring
- Cinematography: Mack Stengler
- Edited by: William Austin
- Music by: Edward J. Kay
- Distributed by: Monogram Pictures
- Release date: March 15, 1947 (United States)
- Running time: 64 minutes
- Country: United States
- Language: English

Fall Guy is a 1947 American crime film noir directed by Reginald LeBorg. The drama features Leo Penn, Robert Armstrong and Teala Loring. The film is based on Cornell Woolrich's short story, "Cocaine."

== Plot ==
With no memory of the night in question and a few clues, a man tries to prove he did not murder an attractive woman. Tom Cochrane, high on cocaine and covered with blood, is picked up by the police and then questioned by detectives Shannon (Douglas Fowley) and Taylor (Harry Strang), but manages to escape. His girlfriend Lois Walter (Teala Loring), against the wishes of her guardian, Jim Grosset (Charles Arnt), assists Tom and his police-officer brother-in-law Mac (Robert Armstrong) in trying to clear Tom of a possible murder charge. Tom only recalls meeting a man in a bar and going to a party. Tom and Mac find the man, Joe (Elisha Cook Jr.), who takes them to the party scene, the apartment of the Shindells (John Harmon and Iris Adrian), where they find the body of a murdered girl in the apartment above. The police pick up Mac, while Tom trails Marie (Virginia Dale) and Mike (Jack Overman). Joe is murdered for leading Tom to the scene of the crime, and Marie, who had been hired by the killer to get Tom at the apartment when the crime was committed, is choked to death. Tom, following the killer of Marie, is almost trapped and killed himself, but is saved by Mike.

== Cast ==
- Leo Penn as Tom Cochrane (billed as Clifford Penn)
- Robert Armstrong as Mac McLaine
- Teala Loring as Lois Walter
- Elisha Cook Jr. as Joe
- Douglas Fowley as Inspector Shannon
- Charles Arnt as Uncle Jim Grossett
- Virginia Dale as Marie
- Iris Adrian as Mrs. Sindell

== Production ==
The Fall Guy was shot in 10 days at Monogram Pictures studios, confirming director Reginald LeBorg "as one of the most cost- and time-conscious directors in the industry." This post-war noir, though atmospherically and plot-wise typical of the genre, is notable in that narcotics trafficking is central to the narrative.

LeBorg declared The Fall Guy one of his favorite pictures.

== Reception ==
TV Guide has rated it 2/4 stars.

== Archival status ==
The Fall Guy is available for study at the Wisconsin Center for Film and Theater Research.
