= The Divorce Racket =

1932 film

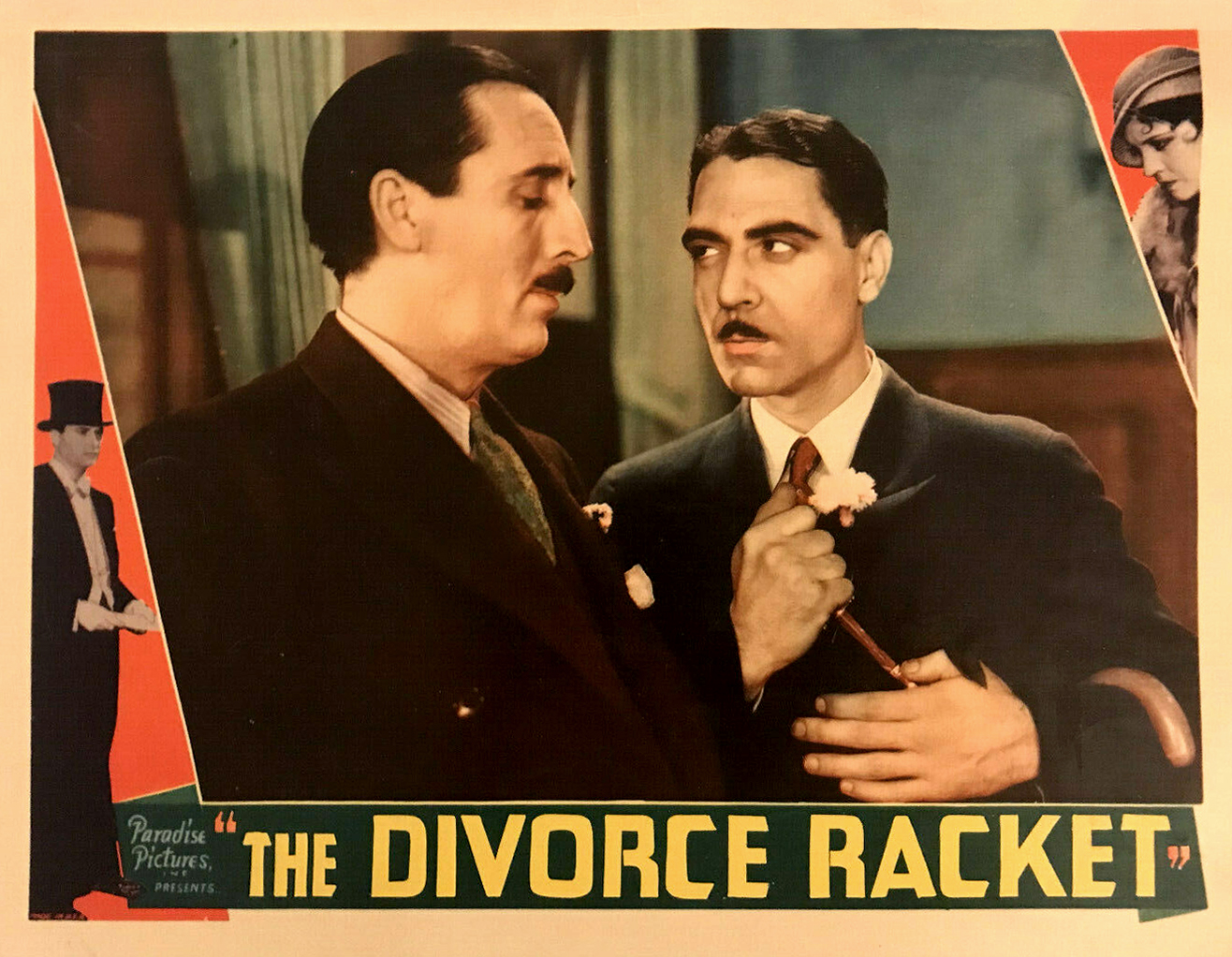
- Lobby card
- Directed by: Aubrey Scotto
- Written by: James W. Poling
- Produced by: E.H. Goldstein
- Starring: James Rennie; Olive Borden; Judith Wood
- Cinematography: William Miller; Frank Zucker
- Edited by: Edna Hill
- Production company: Paradise Pictures
- Distributed by: Ideal Pictures
- Release date: December 3, 1932
- Running time: 66 minutes
- Country: United States
- Language: English

The Divorce Racket is a 1932 American crime drama film directed by Aubrey Scotto and starring James Rennie, Olive Borden and Judith Wood. It is now considered to be a lost film. It was produced by the independent Poverty Row studio Paradise Pictures and was given a re-release by Ideal Pictures in 1935. In Britain it was distributed under the alternative title The Girl in the Cab.

== Plot ==
When a crooked lawyer is found murdered, his secretary is implicated in the case. The investigating detective is in love with her and tries to clear her name.

== Cast ==
- James Rennie as Detective Malcom 'Duke' Ayres
- Olive Borden as Marie Douglas
- Judith Wood as Helen Travers / Paula Murdock
- Wilfred Jessop as Valet
- Harry Tyler as John Hamilton
- Adrian Rosley as Tony, Window Washer
- Charles Eaton as Carl Travers
- Joseph Calleia as Stephen Arnaud
- Walter Fenner as Miguel Cordoba
- Harry Short as Sulk

== Bibliography ==
- Pitts, Michael R. Poverty Row Studios, 1929–1940: An Illustrated History of 55 Independent Film Companies, with a Filmography for Each. McFarland & Company, 2005.
- Vogel, Michelle. Olive Borden: The Life and Films of Hollywood's "Joy Girl". McFarland, 2010.
