= Hush Money (1931 film) =

1931 American comedy-drama film

- Theatrical release poster
- Directed by: Sidney Lanfield
- Written by: Philip Klein; Sidney Lanfield; Dudley Nichols
- Starring: Joan Bennett; Hardie Albright; Owen Moore; Myrna Loy; George Raft
- Cinematography: John F. Seitz
- Music by: Glen Knight
- Distributed by: Fox Film Corporation
- Release date: July 5, 1931
- Running time: 68 minutes
- Country: United States
- Language: English

Hush Money is a 1931 American pre-Code comedy-drama film featuring Joan Bennett, Hardie Albright, Owen Moore, Myrna Loy, and George Raft. The movie was directed by Sidney Lanfield.

== Cast ==
- Joan Bennett as Joan Gordon
- Hardie Albright as Stuart Elliot
- Owen Moore as Steve Pelton
- Myrna Loy as Flo Curtis
- C. Henry Gordon as Jack Curtis
- George Raft as Maxie
