= The Vice Squad =

1931 film

- Directed by: John Cromwell
- Screenplay by: Oliver H.P. Garrett
- Starring: Paul Lukas; Kay Francis; Judith Wood; William B. Davidson; Rockliffe Fellowes; Esther Howard; Monte Carter
- Cinematography: Charles Lang
- Music by: Rudolph G. Kopp; Ralph Rainger
- Production company: Paramount Pictures
- Distributed by: Paramount Pictures
- Release date: May 30, 1931
- Running time: 81 minutes
- Country: United States
- Language: English

The Vice Squad is a 1931 American pre-Code drama film directed by John Cromwell, written by Oliver H.P. Garrett, and starring Paul Lukas, Kay Francis, Judith Wood, William B. Davidson, Rockliffe Fellowes, Esther Howard and Monte Carter. It was released on May 30, 1931, by Paramount Pictures.

== Plot ==
“The vice squad trick a foreign embassy into squealing on an infamous gang of crooks.”

A foreign embassy worker is caught, in an embarrassing situation with the wife of an ambassador. The wife panics and kills a policeman. In trying to avoid revealing the name of the ambassadors's wife to the police, the embassy attache makes a deal with a dirty cop to be used as a stool pigeon to inform on prostitutes. He ends up working on a case of a girl who he knows is innocent, but being framed by the cops, so he is faced with the difficult decision of exposing his past or letting her go to jail.

== Cast ==
- Paul Lukas as Stephen Lucarno
- Kay Francis as Alice Morrison
- Judith Wood as Madeleine Hunt
- William B. Davidson as Magistrate Tom Morrison
- Rockliffe Fellowes as Detective-Sergeant Mather
- Esther Howard as Josie
- Monte Carter as Max Miller
- Juliette Compton as Ambassador's Wife
- G. Pat Collins as Pete
- Phil Tead as Tony
- Davison Clark as Doctor
- Tom Wilson as Night Court Attendant
- James Durkin as Second Magistrate
- William Arnold as Prosecutor
