= The False Madonna =

1931 film

- Directed by: Stuart Walker
- Screenplay by: May Edginton; Ray Harris; Arthur Kober
- Starring: Kay Francis; William "Stage" Boyd; Conway Tearle; John Breeden; Marjorie Gateson; Charles D. Brown
- Cinematography: Henry Sharp
- Music by: W. Franke Harling; John Leipold
- Production company: Paramount Pictures
- Distributed by: Paramount Pictures
- Release date: December 5, 1931
- Running time: 70 minutes
- Country: United States
- Language: English

The False Madonna is a 1931 American drama film directed by Stuart Walker, and written by May Edginton, Ray Harris, and Arthur Kober. The film stars Kay Francis, William "Stage" Boyd, Conway Tearle, John Breeden, Marjorie Gateson, and Charles D. Brown. The film was released on December 5, 1931, by Paramount Pictures.

== Plot ==
In a heavy rainy night two couples -Dr. Ed Marcy, Tina, Rose and Peter Angel - are brought to the station by a hotel bus. Alone in the cabin, they argue with the one of them, who cheated at cards and whom to blame, that they were thrown out of the hotel. Sometime later the train conductor calls on Dr. Ed Marcy because a woman is seriously ill. Marcy refuses first, saying he didn't practice since long, but as the train conductor insists he goes to the cabin of the lady. He finds out, that she was going to see her son Philipp Bellows in New York, whom she hadn't seen for fourteen years and who inherited $10,000,000 from her estranged ex-husband. The woman dies in the train and Marcy takes her photographs and a necklace and convinces Tina to impersonate Philipps mother. Tina who has been longing an opportunity to quit the gang accepts. She meets Philipp at his Long Island New York estate, where he lives with his guardianship Grant Arnold and the nurse Alice. She soon finds out that he is blind due to an airplane crash two years before. He doesn't realize that she is an impostor and asks her to stay. She gets acquainted to Philipp and develops motherly feelings for Philipp and in general she's touched and moved by the affection of Philipp.

Philipp on his part is worried about leaving her something when he dies, knowing that through his will only an aunt will inherit. So he asks Grant to give her a cheque about $50.000 so that she can live better, but Grant tears up the cheque, as he knows about her. But he doesn't say anything to Philipp, as he knows how sick he is, and he'll soon have to die. So he warns Tina to avoid Philipp too much stress. Meantime Marcy is coming to the house to oblige Tina to do something, but in that night Philipp dies.

As Marcy appears the next day demanding money, Grant tells Marcy that he has called the police, and informs him that he found out that Marcy was disbarred from practicing medicine and is wanted by the police. Marcy escapes and Tina is relieved to have that part of her life over, now that she has learned the joy of giving. Grant offers her a home with him and she accepts with an embrace.

== Cast ==
- Kay Francis as Tina
- William "Stage" Boyd as Dr. Ed Marcy
- Conway Tearle as Grant Arnold
- John Breeden as Phillip Bellows
- Marjorie Gateson as Rose
- Charles D. Brown as Peter Angel

Rest of cast listed alphabetically:

- Frank Rice... Bus Driver (uncredited)
- Kent Taylor ... Footman (uncredited)
- May Wallace ... Nurse Alice (uncredited)
- Eric Wilton ... Butler (uncredited)

== Critical reception ==
Variety wrote that "a competent cast [is] worthy of a better story" and that "whatever interest there is present is created by performance and not in the characters themselves." The reviewer stated that William Boyd "is very good as the blackmailer", but Kay Francis, despite giving a good performance, was miscast.
