= Judith Wood =

American actress (1906–2002)

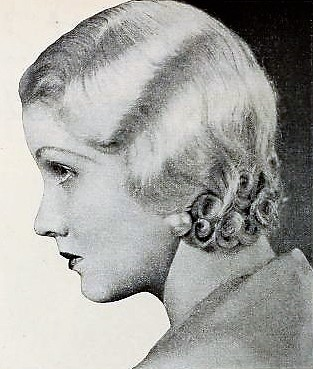
- Born: Helen Johnson; August 1, 1906; New York City, U.S.
- Died: April 6, 2002 (aged 95); Los Angeles, California, U.S.
- Occupation: Actress
- Years active: 1929–1950
- Spouse: Percival Christopher Wren Jr. (m. 1939)

Judith Wood (born Helen Johnson, August 1, 1906 – April 6, 2002) was an American film actress.

== Early years ==
The daughter of cartoonist Merle Johnson, she was born in New York City. Wood moved to Hollywood, California to pursue an acting career in the late 1920s.

She studied art at Skidmore College for a year, then traveled with her mother to Paris, where she continued to study art for two years. Besides learning art, she became fluent in French during her stay in Paris.

After returning to New York, she was a model for illustrations in magazines and for advertisements in addition to designing for theatrical productions.

She changed her name to Judith Wood and was first credited with this name in The Vice Squad (1931).

== Career ==
Wood's first role was in the 1929 film Gold Diggers of Broadway. In this first film, as well as in the four in which she would star during 1930, Wood was credited under her birth name.

Her first film of 1931 was It Pays to Advertise, which starred Carole Lombard. It was the last film in which she was billed as Helen Johnson, and thereafter all of her film credits were under the name Judith Wood. In 1931, she was selected as one of 13 girls to be WAMPAS Baby Stars, along with actresses Marian Marsh, Karen Morley, Marion Shilling, and Barbara Weeks.

Wood starred in six films in 1931, and then her career slowed and eventually faded. Also in 1931, she was injured in an automobile accident and spent months recuperating.

She starred as Kitty Packard in the original Broadway production of Dinner at Eight, but the film version went to Jean Harlow. In 1934, she only received three film roles, one of which was uncredited. In 1936 and 1937, she had small but credited roles in two films, then did not receive another until 1941, which was uncredited. Her last film was in 1950 when she had an uncredited role in The Asphalt Jungle (1950).

== Personal life ==
On March 17, 1939, Wood married Percival Christopher Wren Jr. in Tokyo.

== Later years and death ==
Following her marriage she retired from acting, but remained in Los Angeles. She died there in 2002 of natural causes, aged 95.

== Partial filmography ==
- The Divorcee (1930)
- Children of Pleasure (1930)
- Sin Takes a Holiday (1930)
- It Pays to Advertise (1931)
- The Vice Squad (1931)
- Women Love Once (1931)
- The Road to Reno (1931)
- Girls About Town (1931)
- Working Girls (1931)
- The Divorce Racket (1932)
- Advice to the Lovelorn (1933)
- The Crime Doctor (1934)
- Looking for Trouble (1934)
- Rhythm Racketeer (1937)
- The Asphalt Jungle (1950)
