= Marilyn Knowlden =

American child actress (1926–2025)

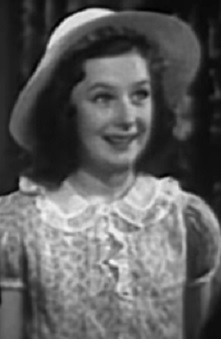
- Knowlden in Barefoot Boy (1938)
- Born: May 12, 1926; Oakland, California, U.S.
- Died: September 15, 2025 (aged 99); Eagle, Idaho, U.S.
- Education: Mills College at Northeastern University
- Occupation: Actress
- Years active: 1931–1995
- Spouse(s): Richard Goates (m. 1946; div. 1978) Eliseo Busnardo (m. 1978; died 2010)
- Children: 3

Marilyn Knowlden (May 12, 1926 – September 15, 2025) was an American child actress. She started appearing in Hollywood films in 1931 when she was four years old. She established herself as a freelancer who worked frequently at different major film studios throughout the decade, being cast in films such as Imitation of Life, Les Misérables, and Angels with Dirty Faces. She worked with such film stars as Katharine Hepburn, Irene Dunne, James Cagney, and Claudette Colbert. In total, six of the films in which she appeared were nominated for an Academy Award for Best Picture, all within the span of seven years.

Knowlden retired from film acting when she became an adult, but was active in local theatre productions as a playwright and composer. She was one of the last surviving actors from the 1930s period of Hollywood's Golden Years.

== Early life ==
Marilyn Knowlden was born in Oakland, California, on May 12, 1926. Her parents were Robert E. Knowlden Jr. (1896–1972), a Utah-born attorney (and later her agent), and Bertha McKenzie.

They married on December 23, 1921. She was an only child. When she was nearly three years old, in early 1929, she entered a beauty pageant for babies and was crowned the winner. She started taking dance lessons at the age of three. One of her teachers saw her show business potential early on, and was convinced that she would make it in the entertainment industry. Among others, she was tutored by Russian-born ballet dancer, choreographer, and actor Theodore Kosloff.

== Career in Hollywood (1931–1944) ==
In 1931, Knowlden's father got her a screen test for the Paramount Pictures film Women Love Once while the whole family was visiting Hollywood for reasons related to Robert's work. He had called Fred Datig, a casting director at Paramount. Despite her young age, she managed to handle a speaking part with many lines without any problems. Due to child labor laws at the time, the family had to get permission for her to be able to work. They survived a car accident that day. Bertha had to be hospitalized for injuring her collar bone and a rib. Marilyn herself was only slightly injured and got help from actress Dolores Costello, who happened to witness the event. As promotion for the film, Knowlden performed at cinemas right before it would start. Her debut was met with praise from various newspapers at the time.

Knowlden worked steadily in films—many high-budget ones—throughout the 1930s. She was often cast as the daughter of the main characters, or as the leading lady in her childhood. Looking like a younger version of the actress cast as the leading lady was often a major reason why she was cast in a certain role. Unlike most actors, children and adults alike, during the studio system era, she was never contracted to a particular studio. Apart from a temporary period during the filming of Marie Antoinette when she studied at Metro-Goldwyn-Mayer's Little Red Schoolhouse, she went to public school instead of schools for child actors in Hollywood. She was in Greta Garbo and Clark Gable's 1931 film Susan Lenox (Her Fall and Rise) but her scenes were deleted in the final cut. In 1933, Knowlden had an uncredited role as a young Flora in the pre-code drama Little Women, which starred Katharine Hepburn, and was nominated for an Academy Award for Best Picture at the 6th Academy Awards in 1934.

By 1934, Knowlden was seen as one of the few child actors to have established herself in a competitive industry. She was one of three actresses to portray Jessie Pullman (at age eight) in the 1934 Universal Pictures film Imitation of Life. Over 100 children had auditioned for the part that she ultimately got. The film, based on Fannie Hurst's 1933 novel of the same name, dealt with the topic of passing (a theme that would again be explored in a film that she appeared in a couple of years later, Show Boat). She played Rochelle Hudson's character as a child. It was nominated for an Academy Award for Best Picture at the 7th Academy Awards the next year. In 2005, the film was selected for preservation in the United States National Film Registry for being deemed "culturally, historically, or aesthetically significant".

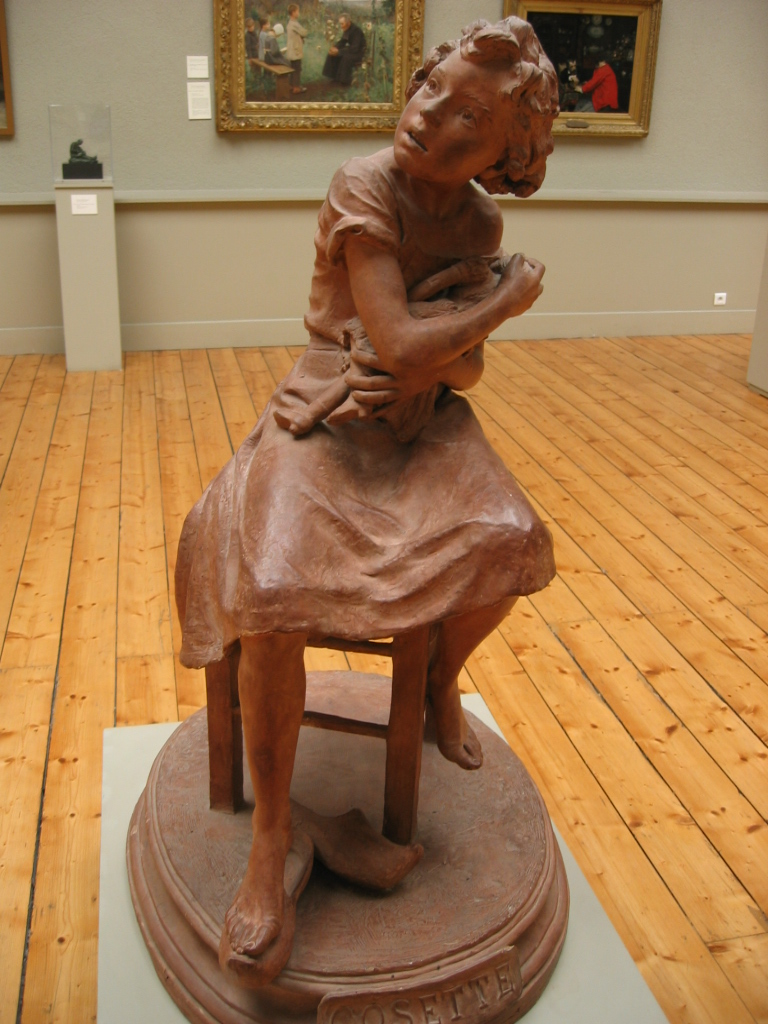
Knowlden portrayed Cosette in Les Misérables (1935)

Knowlden appeared in two Academy Award-nominated films for Best Picture the following year, David Copperfield, and Les Misérables. David Copperfield was based on Charles Dickens's 1850 novel, directed by George Cukor, and released by MGM. It was Freddie Bartholomew's debut in Hollywood. She played David's foster sister Agnes Wickfield as a child. Despite both being cast in the same film, she never met comedic actor W. C. Fields on the set. Her piano playing can be heard in one scene. Les Misérables, directed by Richard Boleslawski, was based on French author Victor Hugo's 1862 novel of the same name. Having both played the same character in Imitation of Life, Knowlden and Rochelle Hudson did it once again in Les Misérables when they portrayed Cosette during different moments of the film. Knowlden's face can be seen on most DVD covers of the film, which starred Fredric March and Charles Laughton. Her performance was described as "memorable" and "excellent" by various newspapers. She would be cast in another one of Boleslawski's films, Metropolitan, later that year.

Knowlden had a small part as Florence Udney in the 1936 epic historical drama film Anthony Adverse, again with Fredric March in a leading role, and Olivia de Havilland as his leading lady. It was nominated for Best Picture at the 9th Academy Awards the following year. She was cast in Rainbow on the River (1936), starring Bobby Breen, one of the few children's films that Knowlden ever appeared in. A reviewer from Detroit Free Press lauded her performance as Lucille Layton, calling her "a fine little actress". In the 1938 historical drama film Marie Antoinette, she portrayed princess Marie Thérèse of France, daughter of the title character, which was played by Norma Shearer. She also played Laurie Martin, James Cagney's character's love interest, as a child in Angels with Dirty Faces the same year.

Knowlden was considered for the role of "Careen O'Hara", Scarlett O'Hara's youngest sister, in Gone With the Wind, which ultimately went to Ann Rutherford. Towards the end of her film career, she made an appearance in All This, and Heaven Too (1940), with Bette Davis and Charles Boyer. She played "Marianna van Horn", one of the school students. This was the sixth time she appeared in a film which would be nominated for Best Picture by the Academy Awards.

The last film in which she appeared was The Way of All Flesh in 1940.

== Later life and death ==
Knowlden attended Beverly Hills High School. She retired from acting in films to concentrate on her education, and developing her musical and dramatic skills. She was attending the private California-based liberal arts and sciences college Mills College, majoring in music and drama, when she met and married the World War II Army Captain Richard Goates on July 30, 1946, at the All Saints Episcopal Church in San Leandro. They had met three years earlier. She accompanied her husband in his assignment in China and Japan, and became a radio announcer for the United States Armed Forces Radio Station in Nanking, which gave them better accommodations than the barracks. The call sign at her radio station was XMAG. They were also stationed in Yokohama and Shanghai. Leaving the military and returning to the United States, Goates enrolled at Stanford University while Marilyn supported him through school. He graduated in business, but not before they had their first child, Carolyn. He then attained his MBA, and they had two more children, Brian and Kevin, plus one foster child. She went back to Mills College as a student at the age of 50. She later divorced Goates in 1978 and married Eliseo Busnardo that same year.

Throughout most of her post-Hollywood life, Knowlden was a musician, songwriter and playwright, authoring a number of songs and musical plays. She often worked with Richard on these projects. For instance, they wrote a local musical called Never Put Off Until Tomorrow in 1962 in association with the Church of Jesus Christ of Latter-day Saints. Richard ran a transportation business at the time. She moved to Fallbrook in 1983. Then, at the age of 69, she had a leading role in a local theater production of My Fair Lady and continued in a variety of roles. Cinecon honored her with a lifetime achievement award at the Cinecon Classic Movies Festival in September 2010. The award was presented to her by actress Marsha Hunt, with whom she had appeared in the 1936 film Easy to Take.

In 2011, she published an autobiography, Little Girl in Big Pictures, describing her experiences as a child actress during the golden years of Hollywood, and telling "the rest of the story" about her life. She had fond memories of her time in Hollywood, and was always supported by her parents. In 2015, she was said to be one of the few people still alive that were working in Hollywood in the 1930s. In 2018, she lived in a retirement home in California.

Knowlden died at an assisted-living facility in Eagle, Idaho, on September 15, 2025, at the age of 99.

== Filmography ==
Year	Title	Role	Studio	Director
1931	Women Love Once	Janet Fields	Paramount	Edward Goodman
1931	The Cisco Kid	Annie	Fox Film Corp.	Irving Cummings
1931	Husband's Holiday	Anne Boyd	Paramount	Robert Milton
1931	Wicked	Girl	Fox Film	Allan Dwan
1931	Once a Lady	Little girl	Paramount	Guthrie McClintic
1932	The Conquerors	Frances Standish	RKO	William Wellman
1932	Call Her Savage	Ruth (as a girl)	Fox Film	John Francis Dillon
1933	The Mind Reader	Little girl	Warner Bros.	Roy Del Ruth
1933	Little Women	Amy's classmate (uncredited)	RKO	George Cukor
1933	The World Changes	Selma (as a child)	Warner Bros.	Mervyn LeRoy
1934	Imitation of Life	Jessie Pullman (age 8)	Universal	John M. Stahl
1934	As the Earth Turns	Esther	Warner Bros.	Alfred E. Green
1935	David Copperfield	Agnes	MGM	George Cukor
1935	Les Misérables	Little Cosette	20th Century Pictures	Richard Boleslawski
1935	Condemned to Live	Maria, the young girl	Invincible Pictures	Frank R. Strayer
1935	Metropolitan	Little girl in tea room	20th Century Fox	Richard Boleslawski
1936	Show Boat	Kim (as a child)	Universal	James Whale
1936	Anthony Adverse	Florence Udney	Warner Bros.	Mervyn LeRoy
1936	A Woman Rebels	Flora at age 9	RKO	Mark Sandrich
1936	Easy to Take	Gwen Ferry	Paramount	Glenn Tryon
1936	Rainbow on the River	Lucille Layton	RKO	Kurt Neumann & George Sherman
1937	Slave Ship	Christener at launching	20th Century Fox	Tay Garnett
1938	Marie Antoinette	Princesse Thérèse	MGM	W. S. Van Dyke
1938	Barefoot Boy	Julia Blaine	Monogram	Karl Brown
1938	Just Around the Corner	Gwendolyn	20th Century Fox	Irving Cummings
1938	Angels with Dirty Faces	Laury (as a child)	Warner Bros.	Michael Curtiz
1939	Hidden Power	Imogene	Columbia	Lewis D. Collins
1940	The Way of All Flesh	Julie Kriza	Paramount	Louis King
1940	All This, and Heaven Too	Marianna van Horn	Warner Bros.	Anatole Litvak

== Sources ==
- Dixie Willson, Little Hollywood Stars, Akron, OH; New York: Saalfield Pub. Co., 1935. OCLC 17445181.
- Marilyn Knowlden, Little Girl in Big Pictures: Autobiography of Marilyn Knowlden, Albany, Ga.: BearManor Media, 2011. OCLC 752332487.
