= Girls About Town (film) =

1931 film

- Film poster
- Directed by: George Cukor
- Written by: Zoë Akins; Raymond Griffith; Brian Marlow
- Produced by: Raymond Griffith
- Starring: Kay Francis; Joel McCrea; Lilyan Tashman
- Cinematography: Ernest Haller
- Distributed by: Paramount Pictures
- Release date: November 7, 1931
- Running time: 80 minutes
- Country: United States
- Language: English

Girls About Town is a 1931 American pre-Code romantic comedy film directed by George Cukor and starring Kay Francis, Lilyan Tashman and Joel McCrea.

== Plot ==
Wanda Howard and Marie Bailey go out with two balding, middle-aged businessmen from out of town (for $500 apiece) to help Jerry Chase close a sale. However, the women, who share a luxurious suite in an apartment building, have their African American maid Hattie disguise herself as their mother, waiting at the window, to avoid having to invite the men inside.

Wanda is getting tired of how she makes a living, but she and Marie go aboard a yacht the next night to divert rich practical joker Benjamin Thomas and his handsome business associate Jim Baker. Jim knows that the women are paid "entertainment", but quickly finds himself falling for Wanda anyway, and vice versa. When Jerry pays her for her efforts, Wanda tears up the check. Once Jim realizes she genuinely loves him, he asks her to marry him. Although she is initially reluctant, she agrees. However, she informs Jim that there is one complication: her estranged husband Alex. She asks him for a divorce, and he agrees.

Meanwhile, Benjamin's wife, who is divorcing him because of his stinginess, shows up and asks Marie to stop making a fool of him. Marie realizes that Mrs. Thomas is still in love with her husband, and comes up with a plan to cure him of his tightfisted ways. The next day, Marie steers Benjamin to the jewelry store where Mrs. Thomas is waiting. Mrs. Thomas, pretending not to see him, complains (in a loud voice) how cheap her husband is. Benjamin becomes so angry he buys Marie some expensive merchandise for about $50,000.

That night, Alex crashes the birthday party Marie has arranged for Benjamin. He tells Jim that he wants $10,000 or he will name Jim as the co-respondent in the divorce. Alex insinuates that Wanda is part of the blackmail scheme. Believing the lie, Jim breaks up with Wanda.

Wanda visits Alex in Brooklyn and demands he give the money back. He introduces her (as "cousin Wanda") to the ailing Mrs. Howard and their baby, the reasons he needs the money so desperately. He confesses that he got a divorce in Mexico two years before, and promises to pay her back once he is back on his feet financially. Touched, Wanda leaves without the check.

Wanda decides to auction off enough of her possessions to her friends to raise $10,000 and pay Jim back. She also asks Marie to return her jewelry. Wanda gives Jim the proceeds; even before that, however, he has come to his senses, and the couple reconcile. Marie gives Benjamin's gifts to his wife and reunites that couple.

== Cast ==
- Kay Francis as Wanda Howard
- Joel McCrea as Jim Baker
- Lilyan Tashman as Marie Bailey
- Eugene Pallette as Benjamin Thomas
- Alan Dinehart as Jerry Chase
- Lucille Webster Gleason as Mrs Benjamin Thomas
- Anderson Lawler as Alex Howard
- Lucile Browne as Edna
- George Barbier as Webster
- Robert McWade as Simms
- Louise Beavers as Hattie

Uncredited:

- Adrienne Ames as Anne
- Frances Bavier as Joy
- Claire Dodd as Dot
- Judith Wood as Winnie

== Reception ==
Mordaunt Hall, The New York Times film critic, gave Girls About Town a qualified favorable review, writing, "This handsomely staged and ably directed production is one that affords no little laughter, but unfortunately it is burdened in the latter stages by highly improbable serious sequences."

== See also ==
- The House That Shadows Built (1931 promotional film by Paramount)
