= Wife Wanted (1946 film) =

1946 film by Phil Karlson

- Theatrical release poster
- Directed by: Phil Karlson
- Screenplay by: Caryl Coleman; Sidney Sutherland
- Based on: the novel Wife Wanted by Robert E. Callahan
- Produced by: Jeffrey Bernerd; Kay Francis
- Starring: Kay Francis; Paul Cavanagh; Robert Shayne
- Cinematography: Harry Neumann
- Edited by: Richard C. Currier; Ace Herman
- Music by: Edward J. Kay
- Production company: Monogram Pictures
- Distributed by: Monogram Pictures
- Release date: November 2, 1946
- Running time: 73 minutes
- Country: United States
- Language: English

Wife Wanted is a 1946 American crime drama film directed by Phil Karlson and starring Kay Francis in her last film role, Paul Cavanagh, and Robert Shayne. The film's screenplay was written by Caryl Coleman and Sidney Sutherland, based on the novel Wife Wanted by Robert E. Callahan.

== Plot ==
Carole Raymond is a film star whose best years are behind her; so, she decides to buy in a real estate plan with Jeff Caldwell, who is really running an illegitimate matrimonial service.

== Cast ==
- Kay Francis as Carole Raymond
- Paul Cavanagh as Jeffrey Caldwell
- Robert Shayne as Bill Tyler
- Veda Ann Borg as Nola Reed
- Teala Loring as Mildred Kayes
- Jonathan Hale as Philip Conway
- Tim Ryan as Bartender
- Barton Yarborough as Walter Desmond

== Production ==
The film was announced in 1946.

Kay Francis was unhappy with the first script; so, she and director Phil Karlson set about obtaining a re-write, and became a producer on the film.

The production period was from mid-June to early July 1946.
