= Hardie Albright =

American actor (1903–1975)

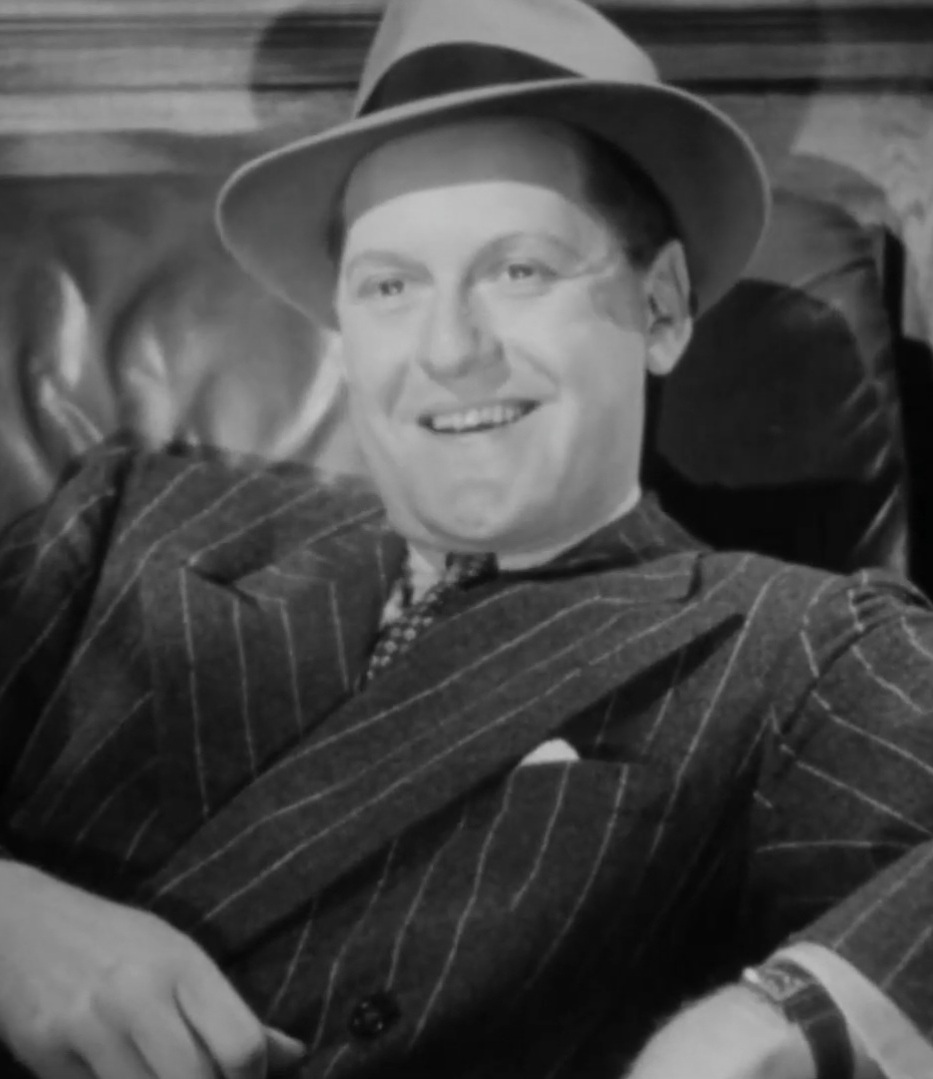
- Albright in Angel on My Shoulder (1946)
- Born: Hardie Hunter Albrecht; December 16, 1903; Charleroi, Pennsylvania, U.S.
- Died: December 7, 1975 (aged 71); Mission Viejo, California, U.S.
- Education: Carnegie Tech
- Occupation: Actor
- Years active: 1925–1966
- Spouses: Martha Sleeper (m. 1934; div. 1939) Arnita Wallace (m. 1944)
- Children: 1

Hardie Hunter Albright (born Hardie Hunter Albrecht; December 16, 1903 – December 7, 1975) was an American actor.

== Early years ==
Albright was born Hardie Hunter Albrecht on December 16, 1903, in Charleroi, Pennsylvania, to traveling vaudeville performers. He made his stage debut in one of his parents' acts at the age of six.

In June 1926, Albright graduated from Carnegie Tech with a bachelor of arts degree in drama.

== Career ==
Albright gained acting experience as a member of the repertory company of Eva Le Gallienne. His Broadway debut came in Saturday Night (1926).

He was playing the juvenile lead on the stage in The Greeks Had a Word for It when a scout from Fox Film saw him. He was given a contract and headed for Hollywood. Albright made his film debut in 1931 in John G. Blystone's Young Sinners and appeared in numerous films. He provided the (uncredited) voice of the adolescent Bambi in the Disney film of the same title.

Broadway plays in which Albright appeared included All the Living (1938), Behind Red Lights (1937), Play, Genius, Play! (1935), The Greeks Had a Word for It (1930), A Hundred Years Old (1929), Gang War (1928), The Merchant of Venice (1928), Such Is Life (1927), Twelfth Night (1924), John Gabriel Borkman (1926), The Three Sisters (1926), and Saturday Night (1926).

He retired from film acting after World War II and became a drama instructor at UCLA, writing several books on acting and directing during his time there. During the 1960s, he made many guest appearances on television series such as Hazel, Leave It to Beaver, Bewitched and Gunsmoke.

== Personal life ==
In 1934, Albright married actress Martha Sleeper. They divorced in 1939. He married actress Arnita Wallace in 1944, and they had one daughter, actress Vicky Albright. They remained wed until his death.

== Death ==
On December 7, 1975, Albright died from congestive heart failure at Mission Community Hospital in Mission Viejo, California. His ashes were sprinkled at his former vacation site in Lancaster County, Pennsylvania.

== Partial filmography ==
- Young Sinners (1931) as Gene Gibson
- Hush Money (1931) as Stuart Elliot
- Skyline (1931) as John Breen
- Heartbreak (1931) as Count Carl Walden
- So Big (1932) as Dirk De Jong
- The Purchase Price (1932) as Don Leslie
- Jewel Robbery (1932) as Paul
- This Sporting Age (1932) as Johnny Raeburn
- A Successful Calamity (1932) as George Struthers, Peggy's Beau
- The Cabin in the Cotton (1932) as Roland Neal
- The Crash (1932) as Arthur Pringle
- Three on a Match (1932) as Phil (uncredited)
- The Match King (1932) as Erik Borg
- The Working Man (1933) as Benjamin Burnett
- The Song of Songs (1933) as Walter Von Prell
- Three-Cornered Moon (1933) as Ronald
- The House on 56th Street (1933) as Henry Burgess
- The Ninth Guest (1934) as Henry Abbott
- Nana (1934) as Lieutenant Gregory (uncredited)
- White Heat (1934) as Chandler Morris
- Beggar's Holiday (1934) as Dapper Frank Mason aka Bing
- The Scarlet Letter (1934) as Arthur Dimmesdale
- Two Heads on a Pillow (1934) as David L. Talbot
- Crimson Romance (1934) as Hugo
- The Silver Streak (1934) as Allan Dexter
- Sing Sing Nights (1934) as Howard Trude
- Women Must Dress (1935) as David
- Calm Yourself (1935) as Bobby Kent
- Champagne for Breakfast (1935) as Bob Bentley - a penniless young lawyer
- Ladies Love Danger (1935) as Phil Morton
- Red Salute (1935) as Leonard Arner
- Granny Get Your Gun (1940) as Phil Westcott
- Ski Patrol (1940) as Tyko Gallen
- Carolina Moon (1940) as Henry Wheeler
- Flight from Destiny (1941) as Ferrers
- Men of the Timberland (1941) as Dudley
- Bachelor Daddy (1941) as Ethelbert
- Navy Blues (1941) as Officer (uncredited)
- Marry the Boss's Daughter (1941) as Putnam Palmer
- Men of the Timberland (1941) as Jim Dudley
- Captains of the Clouds (1942) as Kingsley
- The Mad Doctor of Market Street (1942) as William Saunders
- Saboteur (1942) as Detective (uncredited)
- Lady in a Jam (1942) as Milton
- The Pride of the Yankees (1942) as Van Tuyl
- Bambi (1942) as Bambi Adolescent (voice, uncredited)
- The Loves of Edgar Allan Poe (1942) as Shelton
- Army Wives (1944) as Verne
- Mom and Dad (1945) as Carl Blackburn
- The Jade Mask (1945) as Walter Meeker
- Sunset in El Dorado (1945) as Cecil Phelps / Cyril Earle
- Captain Tugboat Annie (1945) as Johnny Webb
- Angel on My Shoulder (1946) as Smiley Williams

== Television ==
Year	Title	Role	Notes
1961	Rawhide	Ben Wallace	S3:E23, "Incident of the Phantom Bugler"
1961	Rawhide	Veterinarian	S4:E7, "The Black Sheep"
1962	Leave It To Beaver	Mr. Collins	S5:E31, "Brother Versus Brother"
1962	Leave It To Beaver	Mr. Collins	S5:E35, "Sweatshirt Monsters"
