= Strangers in Love =

1932 film

- Directed by: Lothar Mendes
- Screenplay by: Grover Jones; William J. Locke; William Slavens McNutt
- Produced by: Robert Harris
- Starring: Fredric March; Kay Francis; Stuart Erwin; Juliette Compton; George Barbier; Sidney Toler; Earle Foxe
- Cinematography: Henry Sharp
- Music by: Rudolph G. Kopp; John Leipold; Stephan Pasternacki
- Production company: Paramount Pictures
- Distributed by: Paramount Pictures
- Release date: March 4, 1932
- Running time: 76 minutes
- Country: United States
- Language: English

Strangers in Love is a 1932 American pre-Code comedy film directed by Lothar Mendes, written by Grover Jones, William J. Locke and William Slavens McNutt, and starring Fredric March, Kay Francis, Stuart Erwin, Juliette Compton, George Barbier, Sidney Toler and Earle Foxe. It was released on March 4, 1932, by Paramount Pictures.

== Cast ==
- Fredric March as Buddy Drake/Arthur Drake
- Kay Francis as Diana Merrow
- Stuart Erwin as Stan Kenney
- Juliette Compton as Muriel Preston
- George Barbier as Mr. Merrow
- Sidney Toler as McPhail
- Earle Foxe as J.C. Clark
- Lucien Littlefield as Professor Clark
- Leslie Palmer as Bronson
- Gertrude Howard as Snowball
- Ben Taggart as Crenshaw
