= Juliette Compton =

American actress (1899–1989)

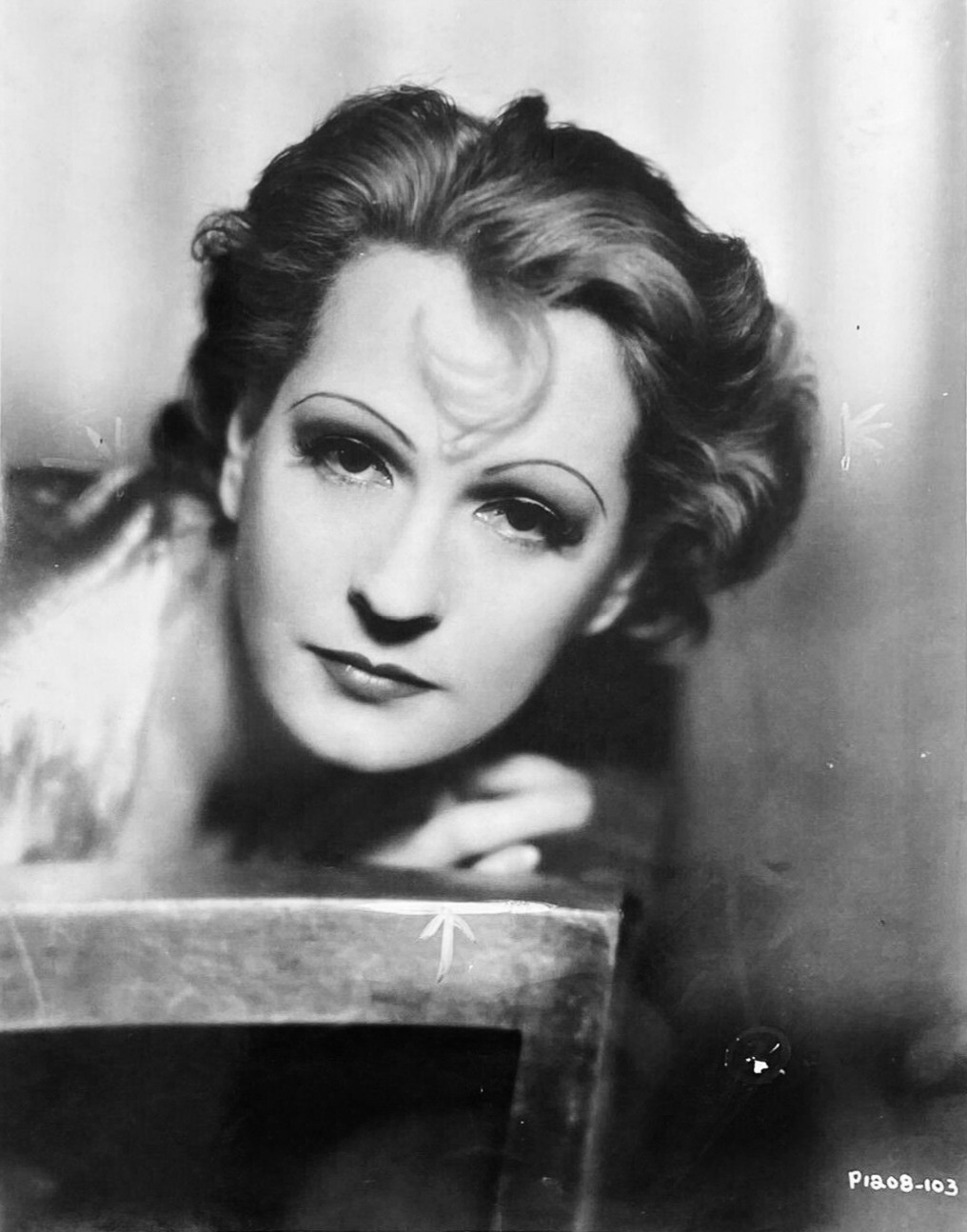
- Compton c. 1930
- Born: May 3, 1899; Columbus, Georgia, U.S.
- Died: March 19, 1989 (aged 89); Pasadena, California, U.S.
- Other names: Julie Compton; Juliet Compton
- Occupation: Actress
- Years active: 1920–1941
- Spouse: James Bartram (m. 1926; div. 1942)

Juliette Compton (May 3, 1899 – March 19, 1989) was an American dancer and actress whose career began in the silent film era and concluded with That Hamilton Woman in 1941.

== Career ==
Compton was born in Columbus, Georgia, on May 3, 1899. She was a model for illustrator Harrison Fisher, and perhaps his favorite model.

Compton's show business career began in 1918 with Broadway the musical The Kiss Burglar. She went on to appear in the Broadway musical What's in A Name and the 1920 Ziegfeld Follies.

She appeared on film in 1924, including the movie The Wine of Life. Compton went on to make dozens of films until 1941 when she appeared in That Hamilton Woman.

In London, she appeared on stage, including the musical The League of Notions with the Dolly Sisters.

== Financial problems ==
On January 4, 1927, a bankruptcy court in London, England, appointed an official receiver for Compton after presentation of evidence that she had no assets and had liabilities of $37,500. A news brief distributed by International News Service said that a nervous breakdown suffered by Compton was "attributed to difficulties in which she finds herself over debts."

== Personal life ==
Compton married James Bartram, an Australian businessman, on December 24, 1926, in London, England. She left the nursing home where she had been ill for several weeks in order to be married at Christ Church, then returned to the nursing home immediately after the wedding. They separated in 1936 and divorced on March 25, 1942.

She died in Pasadena, California.

== Partial filmography ==
- The Wine of Life (1924) − Regine
- Her Redemption (1924) − Liana Vandry
- Human Desires (1924) − Andree de Vigne
- Afraid of Love (1925) − Ruth
- Trainer and Temptress (1925) − Lady Maurice
- The Third Round (1925) − Irma Peterson
- Nell Gwyn (1926) − Lady Castlemaine
- The Chinese Bungalow (1926) − Sadie
- The Woman Tempted (1926) − Louise Harding
- White Heat (1927) − Helen
- The Fake (1927) − Mrs. Hesketh Pointer
- Change of Heart (1928) − Lady Winham
- The Triumph of the Scarlet Pimpernel (1928) − Theresa Cabbarrus
- Woman to Woman (1929) − Vesta Compton
- Ladies of Leisure (1930) − Claire Collins
- Anybody's Woman (1930) − Ellen
- Morocco (1930) − Anna Dolores (uncredited)
- Unfaithful (1931) − Gemma Houston
- Kick In (1931) − Piccadilly Bessie
- The Vice Squad (1931) − Ambassador's Wife
- Women Love Once (1931) − Hester Dahlgren
- Rich Man's Folly (1931) − Paula Norcross
- Compromised (1931) − Connie Holt
- Husband's Holiday (1931) − Christine Kennedy
- No One Man (1932) − Sue Folsom
- Strangers in Love (1932) − Muriel Preston
- Westward Passage (1932) − Henrietta
- The Man Called Back (1932) − Vivien Lawrence
- Devil and the Deep (1932) − Mrs. Planet
- The Match King (1932) − Sonia Lombard
- Peg o' My Heart (1933) − Ethel Chichester
- The Masquerader (1933) − Lady Diana Joyce
- Berkeley Square (1933) − Duchess of Devonshire
- Grand Canary (1934) − Elissa Bayham
- The Count of Monte Cristo (1934) − Clothilde
- Behold My Wife (1934) − Diana Carter−Curson
- No More Ladies (1935) − Woman (uncredited)
- Irene (1940) − Mrs. Newlands Grey
- That Hamilton Woman (1941) − Lady Spencer (final film role)
