= Women Love Once =

1931 film

- Directed by: Edward Goodman
- Screenplay by: Zoë Akins
- Starring: Paul Lukas; Eleanor Boardman; Juliette Compton; Geoffrey Kerr; Judith Wood; Marilyn Knowlden
- Cinematography: Karl Struss
- Music by: Ralph Rainger
- Production company: Paramount Pictures
- Distributed by: Paramount Pictures
- Release date: July 4, 1931
- Running time: 71 minutes
- Country: United States
- Language: English

Women Love Once is a 1931 American pre-Code drama film directed by Edward Goodman and written by Zoë Akins. The film stars Paul Lukas, Eleanor Boardman, Juliette Compton, Geoffrey Kerr, Judith Wood and Marilyn Knowlden. The film was released on July 4, 1931, by Paramount Pictures.

== Cast ==
- Paul Lukas as Julien Fields
- Eleanor Boardman as Helen Fields
- Juliette Compton as Hester Dahlgren
- Geoffrey Kerr as Allen Greenough
- Judith Wood as Olga
- Marilyn Knowlden as Janet Fields
- Claude King as Theodore Stewart
- Mischa Auer as Oscar
