= Skyline (1931 film) =

1931 film

- Lobby card
- Directed by: Sam Taylor
- Based on: East Side, West Side by Felix Riesenberg
- Produced by: John W. Considine Jr. Fox Film Corporation
- Starring: Thomas Meighan; Hardie Albright
- Cinematography: John J. Mescall
- Edited by: Harold Schuster
- Music by: George Lipschultz
- Production company: Fox Film Corporation
- Distributed by: Fox Film Corporation
- Release date: October 11, 1931
- Running time: 68 minutes; 7 reels
- Country: United States
- Language: English

Skyline is a 1931 American pre-Code drama film directed by Sam Taylor and starring silent film veteran Thomas Meighan. It is based on a novel—East Side, West Side—by Felix Riesenberg. It was produced and released by Fox Film Corporation.

== Cast ==
- Thomas Meighan – Gordon A. McClellan
- Hardie Albright – John Breen
- Maureen O'Sullivan – Kathleen Kearny
- Myrna Loy – Paula Lambert
- Stanley Fields – Captain Breen
- Jack Kennedy – Kearny
- Robert McWade – Judge West
- Don Dillaway – Gerry Gaige
- Alice Ward – Mrs. Kearny
- Dorothy Peterson – Rose Breen
