= Human Desires =

1924 film

- American release poster
- Directed by: Burton George
- Written by: Burton George; Louis Stevens
- Produced by: Archibald Nettlefold
- Starring: Marjorie Daw; Clive Brook; Juliette Compton
- Production company: Anglia Films Ltd
- Distributed by: Gaumont British Distributors; Film Booking Offices of America (US)
- Release date: November 1924
- Running time: 7 reels
- Country: United Kingdom
- Language: Silent (English intertitles)

Human Desires is a 1924 British silent romance film directed by Burton George and starring Marjorie Daw, Clive Brook and Juliette Compton. It is also known by the alternative title of Love's Bargain.

== Plot ==
As described in a film magazine review, Joan Thayer, ambitious for a stage career, becomes a wife in name only to Georges Gautier, a wealthy and influential banker. She loves the young poet Henri Regnier, but he fears to ask her to marry him because of his poverty. She cannot learn to care for her husband, and a former mistress of Georges' complicates things. When Georges realizes that Joan does not care for him, he secures a divorce. Joan gives up her stage ambitions and marries her poet, while the husband is left with his memories.

== Cast ==
- Marjorie Daw as Joan Thayer
- Clive Brook as Georges Gautier
- Juliette Compton as Andree de Vigne
- Warwick Ward as Pierre Brandon
- Russell Thorndike as Paul Perot
- Jean de Limur as Henri Regnier

== Bibliography ==
- Low, Rachel. The History of British Film: Volume IV, 1918–1929. Routledge, 1997.
