= Women in the Wind =

1939 film directed by John Farrow

- Theatrical film poster
- Directed by: John Farrow
- Written by: George Bricker (contributing writer); Lawrence Kimble (contributor to treatment)
- Screenplay by: Lee Katz; Albert DeMond
- Based on: Women in the Wind: A Novel of the Women's National Air Derby (1935 novel) by Francis Walton
- Produced by: Bryan Foy
- Starring: Kay Francis; William Gargan; Victor Jory
- Cinematography: Sidney Hickox
- Edited by: Thomas Pratt
- Music by: M.K. Jerome
- Production company: Warner Bros. Pictures
- Distributed by: Warner Bros. Pictures
- Release date: April 15, 1939
- Running time: 65 minutes
- Country: United States
- Language: English

Women in the Wind is a 1939 drama film directed by John Farrow and starring Kay Francis, William Gargan and Victor Jory. The plot concerns women pilots competing in the so-called "Powder Puff Derby", an annual transcontinental air race solely for women. (Note: Humorist Will Rogers called the 1929 Women's Air Derby, the "Powder Puff Derby", the name by which the race is most commonly known.)

== Plot ==
The women's air derby from Los Angeles to Cleveland means a lot to young aviator Janet Steele (Kay Francis), who uses every trick in the book to try to persuade record-setting pilot Ace Boreman (William Gargan) to lend her his very fast aircraft. Ace is reluctant, but Janet steals his craft to demonstrate her skill. He also learns that she is the sister of Bill Steele (Charles Anthony Hughes), a pilot friend of his who crashed and is bedridden. When Ace discovers that Janet needs the money to pay for an operation for Bill, he has no further objections to Janet flying his airplane.

Complications ensue when Ace's estranged ex-wife Frieda (Sheila Bromley) notifies him their Mexican divorce is not legal. The airplane remains half hers, and she intends to go after the derby's $15,000 first prize herself. She manages to convince Janet that Ace is a heel. Ace is able to get his buddy Denny Corson (Eddie Foy, Jr.), who has just broken his speed record, to let Janet use his home-built aircraft instead, without letting Janet know that Ace is responsible.

In the race, Janet reaches the first stopover at Wichita first, with Frieda close behind. Janet and Ace's friend Kit Campbell (Eve Arden) crashes after her engine catches fire. Janet wants to stay with her, but Kit insists she is okay; she also hands Janet a letter. The letter is from Doc; he loves Janet himself, but writes that it was Ace who got her Denny's airplane. Meanwhile, Frieda runs into an acquaintance working as a race mechanic. He asks her if it is worth $2000 to her to have Janet's airplane sabotaged. When she agrees, the mechanic arranges a fuel leak. Janet is forced to land on a farm. She manages to refuel, but as she is taking off again, she clips something and one of the wheels on her landing gear is torn off without her noticing. When Janet flies into a severe electrical storm, her radio is disabled.

Frieda and Janet are neck and neck at the finish in Cleveland. The people on the ground see that Janet's landing gear is damaged, but are unable to notify her. Frieda, hearing the radio message, signals Janet about her danger, forfeiting her own opportunity to win. Janet is able to land safely and win the race. Afterward, she thanks Frieda, who also hands Ace a telegram that says the divorce was legal after all, so Janet wins Ace as well.

== Cast ==
- Kay Francis as Janet Steele
- William Gargan as Ace Boreman
- Eve Arden as Kit Campbell
- Sheila Bromley as Frieda Boreman
- Eddie Foy, Jr. as Denny Corson
- Victor Jory as Doc
- Maxie Rosenbloom as "Stuffy" McInnes
- Charles Anthony Hughes as Bill Steele
- Frankie Burke as Johnnie
- Spencer Charters as Farmer
- Vera Lewis as Farmer's Wife
- William Gould as Palmer
- Gordon Hart as Air Races Official
- Ila Rhodes as Joan

Women in the Wind: A Novel of the Women's National Air Derby by Frances Walton

== Production ==
=== Original novel ===
The film was based on the novel of the same name by Frances Walton, which was published in 1935. The novel was loosely based on the 1929 Women's Air Derby, the first official women-only air race in the United States held during the 1929 National Air Races. A total of 19 pilots took off from Santa Monica, California on August 18, 1929 (another left the next day) with 15 pilots continuing to Cleveland, Ohio, landing nine days later.

The New York Times called the novel "well written and swift paced".

=== Development ===
Film rights were bought by Warner Bros. who assigned Kay Francis to star. It was the last Warner Bros. contract film for Kay Francis. The film represented the culmination of her longstanding feud with the studio bosses. Once an A-list star, Francis was frustrated with the roles Warner Bros. had given her in the late 1930s. The studio considered her "box office poison" and wanted to end her contract but Francis refused, touching off an embarrassing effort to force the star out, even making her act as a prompter for other actors and assigning her to B-list fare such as Women in the Wind.

In July 1938 writers were told to rewrite the film to incorporate a round-the-world race to exploit the recent achievements of Howard Hughes.

"It is expected that the film will end her career at Warners in a blaze of glory", wrote the Los Angeles Times.

At one stage the film was going to be retitled Dublin By Mistake to cash in on the Douglas Corrigan flight. The movie was going to have an all-female cast but then it was decided not to. William Gargan played the male lead. (It was the eighth time Gargan played an aviator in his career.)

=== Shooting ===
Filming started 2 September 1938.

The film did mark an early role for later star, Eve Arden, albeit one that she thought was ludicrous when effects turned her crash landing into an "atom bomb" going off. The fiery crash scene set off guffaws from the test audience who saw her emerge from the blazing wreck with hardly a smudge on her cheek. Fortunately, the final release has a more conventional crash scene with Ms. Arden's character badly injured and carried off on a stretcher.

A number of scenes utilized footage from record-breaking round-the-world and transatlantic flights. Aircraft for the film were provided by Hollywood film pilot Howard Blatt.

== Reception ==
Critically reviewed in The New York Times by Frank S. Nugent, Women in the Wind was considered lackluster and ground-hugging, despite the action being set in an air race. "It is another commonplace little fiction embroidered upon the Powder Puff Derby, the annual transcontinental race for the women fliers, with Kay Francis as the girl who simply has to win the race to get money for her brother's operation. Everything happens according to formula ..." In a later review by film critic and historian Leonard Maltin, he dismissed it as a "Trite programmer."
