= The Match King =

1932 film

- Movie poster
- Directed by: William Keighley; Howard Bretherton
- Written by: Houston Branch; Sidney Sutherland
- Produced by: Hal B. Wallis
- Starring: Warren William; Lili Damita; Glenda Farrell; Juliette Compton
- Cinematography: Robert Kurrle
- Edited by: Jack Killifer
- Music by: W. Franke Harling; Bernhard Kaun
- Production company: First National Pictures
- Distributed by: Warner Bros. Pictures
- Release dates: December 7, 1932 (New York); December 22, 1932 (Los Angeles)
- Running time: 79 minutes
- Country: United States
- Language: English
- Budget: $165,000

The Match King is a 1932 American pre-Code First National Pictures drama film directed by William Keighley and Howard Bretherton. The film stars Warren William and Lili Damita and is based on a novel by Einar Thorvaldson that follows the rise and fall of Swedish safety match tycoon Ivar Kreuger.

== Plot ==
Chicago street cleaner and Swedish immigrant Paul Kroll is ambitious and unscrupulous. When a fellow employee is fired as result of Kroll's scheme, Kroll convinces his foreman to allow him to remain on the payroll so that they can split his salary. There are soon eight of these phantom workers, and Kroll and his partner have amassed enough money for a ticket back to Sweden. However, Kroll has been romancing his partner's wife Babe behind his back. He has also been lying to the people of his hometown in Sweden, telling them that he has become a successful businessman. As a result, when the local match factory is in trouble, his uncle begs him to return and save it. Kroll persuades Babe to withdraw the money that he has stolen by deluding her to believe that they are escaping together, but he then leaves her behind when he sails to Sweden.

Kroll cons the local bank to extend him a loan in order to buy a second match factory so that he can merge them. Kroll's old friend Erik Borg is the only one who knows the truth about Kroll's success, so Kroll hires him as his assistant. Eventually Kroll owns all of the match factories in Sweden, but his ambitions do not stop there. Using information obtained from beautiful, influential women whom he has charmed, he acquires monopolies in the match business, first in Poland, then in Germany and other countries, by offering loans to cash-strapped governments and bribes to corrupt officials.

While dining with Ilse Wagner, one of his conquests, he is dazzled by rising actress Marta Molnar. Despite her initial rebuffs, Kroll goes to great lengths to win her heart, even hiring a celebrated gypsy violinist to serenade her. However, he dangerously neglects his business, which is financed by a growing series of loans. When Marta leaves for Hollywood, he reluctantly returns his attention to his company. After Kroll learns that eccentric recluse Christian Hobe has invented an everlasting match, Kroll causes Hobe to be institutionalized as a madman. When the stock market crashes, Kroll can no longer obtain a bank loan. In desperation, he buys $50 million in fake Italian bonds from forger Scarlatti, then arranges for him to fall overboard to drown in a lake. With the bonds as collateral, he obtains a $40 million loan from an American bank.

Marta has returned to Sweden and Kroll considers retirement, but when he asks Marta to marry him, she informs him she has fallen in love with Trino, the gypsy violinist. Kroll's forgeries are detected and his American loan is canceled. Kroll shoots himself on the balcony and his body tumbles into the gutter from where he had started.

== Cast ==
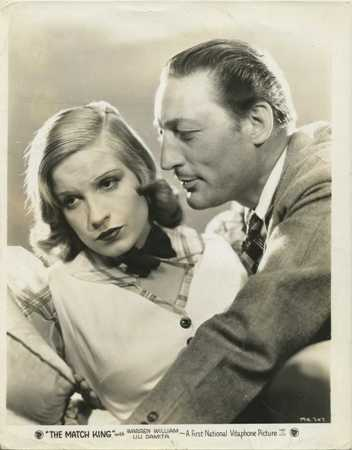
Film still with Damita and William

- Warren William as Paul Kroll
- Lili Damita as Marta Molnar
- Glenda Farrell as Babe
- Juliette Compton as Sonia Lombard
- Claire Dodd as Ilse Wagner
- Harold Huber as Scarlatti
- John Wray as Foreman
- Spencer Charters as Oscar
- Murray Kinnell as Nyberg
- Hardie Albright as Erik Borg
- Alan Hale as Borglund
- Harry Beresford as Christian Hobe (uncredited)

== Reception ==
In a contemporary review for The New York Times, critic Mordaunt Hall wrote: "The dialogue in this feature is well written and Mr. William's performance is efficient. He knows his character and plays it for what it is worth. ... Mr. William plays with sagacity and a sense of humor, but the story is not as important as it might have been, its fiber being weakened by lurid stuff and bromidic ideas. ... But the overbearing manner of the match king, his steam-roller manoeuvres and his quick wit are exceedingly entertaining."

Reviewer John Scott of the Los Angeles Times wrote: "The new film holds much of interest and much of entertainment value. Its main weakness lies in the story treatment, which does not deal enough with the romantic side of the leading character and his love for the cinema star, and presents too meandering a picture of the match king's industrial coups. But for those who don't go to movies to pick them to pieces. 'The Match King' is recommended."

== Preservation ==
A print of the film is held at the Library of Congress.

== See also ==
- Night of January 16th, a play also inspired by Ivar Kreuger
