= Allotment Wives =

1945 film by William Nigh

- Theatrical release poster
- Directed by: William Nigh
- Written by: Sidney Sutherland (story and screenplay); Harvey Gates (screenplay)
- Produced by: Jeffrey Bernerd; Kay Francis (co-producer)
- Starring: Kay Francis; Paul Kelly
- Cinematography: Harry Neumann
- Edited by: William Austin
- Music by: Edward J. Kay
- Production company: Monogram Pictures
- Distributed by: Monogram Pictures
- Release date: November 8, 1945
- Running time: 78 minutes
- Country: United States
- Language: English

Allotment Wives is a 1945 American film noir directed by William Nigh and starring Kay Francis. Its plot is about an army investigator who tries to shut down a scam that preys on soldiers, and unknowingly falls in love with the woman behind it.

== Plot ==
The Office of Dependency Benefits, O.D.B., is a U.S. government agency in charge of payment and financial support to women who have husbands serving in World War II. Even after the war, the office still handles all these issues.

Colonel Pete Martin from the Army Intelligence is assigned to investigate a series of incorrect claims for support that has been discovered at the O.D.B. Among other things, there is evidence that some women have married multiple times to get more money. Pete's job is to find these fraudulent women and bring them to justice. Pete goes undercover as a newspaper reporter, which used to be his job before the war. He begins his investigations on the West Coast, keeping an eye on the suspected women.

He observes a suspicious young woman named Helen Keefe give cash to an equally suspicious-looking man, George Shields, and after that, she is introduced to another young man. Pete immediately orders their arrest. At the restaurant, a businesswoman named Sheila Seymour introduces herself to Pete. She claims to be the owner of an upscale beauty salon and running a canteen for servicemen. Pete is unaware that she also is the head of the racketeering business and in charge of all the allotment frauds. To her aid, she has three men: Whitey Colton, Louis Moranto, and Deacon Sam.

Since Pete discovered a case of ongoing fraud in the restaurant, Sheila is furious with her associates, and fires Moranto for not doing his job properly. Whitey is sent to tail Pete and keep track of his investigation. Whitey follows Pete to the O.D.B. offices, and confirms that he is an investigator. Pete continues to pretend being a reporter, and goes to Sheila's canteen. He meets her, and they agree to meet the next day for an interview as background to one of the article he pretends to write. He is still unaware of Sheila's involvement in the racket.

Sheila sees her daughter, Connie, in a bar with two soldiers, and becomes upset with her behavior. Sheila tells Connie that she has to stay in school for two more months, after which they will go to South America together with Whitey. Sheila's plan is to quit the racketeering business by then.

But problem arises as Spike Malone, one of Moranto's former goons, and his girlfriend Gladys Smith try to get into the racketeering business. They follow Sheila to her home and see her daughter Connie. It turns out Gladys recognizes Sheila, because she used to go to reform school with her. Pete sees signs of the racketeering business when he visits the canteen, and the next time he meets Sheila, he warns her about the illegal business going on at her place of business. Gladys starts working Sheila by sending her blackmail letters. Sheila puts Whitey on catching the blackmailer and handing her over to the police. She succeeds, and Gladys ends up in jail, where she meets Helen and finds out that Sheila is, in fact, running the whole allotment racketeering business. After telling Gladys, Helen commits suicide in jail.

Gladys is soon released from jail, and decides to get her revenge in Sheila through her daughter. Gladys and Spike arrange a string of wild parties, and get Connie to attend them. Then, they sneak into Sheila's home and threaten her with a gun, asking for a large sum of money in exchange for Connie. Sheila manages to alert Whitey about her situation, and he and his men arrive to the rescue. A gunfight ensues, and Spike is shot and runs off, injured. Sheila manages to kill Gladys. After all the wild partying, Connie is taken into custody by Pete, and since he is not aware that Sheila is the girl's mother, he asks her to help him with Connie, as a role model the girl can look up to. Sheila again uses Whitey, and sends him off to break Connie out from captivity. He manages to do that, but is shot and wounded in doing so.

In the meantime, Pete has tracked Spike, and finds out that he is involved with Sheila somehow. Sheila and Connie pack to go to Mexico together, but Sheila goes to take care of Pete before they leave. Connie is sent ahead for Mexico with her other reliable associate Deacon, but they are stopped. Sheila attempts to kill Pete, but she is herself killed by one of his men. Pete decides to let Connie run, and turns in his report to the O.B.D, suggesting they forget about her background.

== Cast ==
- Kay Francis as Sheila Seymour
- Paul Kelly as Major Pete Martin
- Otto Kruger as Whitey Colton
- Gertrude Michael as Gladys Smith
- Teala Loring as Connie Seymour
- Bernard Nedell as Spike Malone
- Anthony Warde as Joe Agnew
- Matty Fain as Louie Moranto
- Jonathan Hale as Brigadier General H. N. Gilbert
- Selmer Jackson as Deacon Sam
- Terry Frost as George Shields
- Reid Kilpatrick as Philip Van Brook
- Doris Lloyd as Alice Van Brook
- Marcelle Corday as Madame Gaston
- Elizabeth Wright as Helen Keefe

== Production ==
During the war, newspapers ran stories regarding the problem of infidelity among the spouses of absent military men and the women, sometimes called Allotment Annies, who married one or more men in order to obtain their allotment checks. In 1943 Senator Edwin C. Johnson and Representative John Sparkman spoke against these women, and the film soon followed.

Monogram Pictures promoted the film as showcasing a social problem. For free publicity, the film's pressbook recommended that theater operators obtain local welfare worker and judge testimonials regarding their experience with women who had married military men in order to obtain their allotments and those who attempted to obtain divorces while their husbands were overseas.
