= Mandalay (film) =

1934 film by Michael Curtiz

- Theatrical film poster
- Directed by: Michael Curtiz
- Screenplay by: Austin Parker; Charles Kenyon
- Story by: Paul Hervey Fox
- Produced by: Robert Presnell Sr.
- Starring: Kay Francis; Ricardo Cortez; Warner Oland; Lyle Talbot
- Cinematography: Tony Gaudio
- Edited by: Thomas Pratt
- Music by: Uncredited: Heinz Roemheld; Songs: Sammy Fain (music); Irving Kahal (lyrics)
- Production company: First National Pictures
- Distributed by: Warner Bros. Pictures
- Release date: February 10, 1934
- Running time: 65 minutes
- Country: United States
- Language: English
- Budget: $294,000
- Box office: $629,000

Mandalay is a 1934 American pre Code drama film directed by Michael Curtiz and written by Austin Parker and Charles Kenyon based on a story by Paul Hervey Fox. The film stars Kay Francis, Ricardo Cortez, Warner Oland and Lyle Talbot, and features Ruth Donnelly and Reginald Owen.

The film is about a world-weary woman (Francis) nicknamed "Spot White" at the local brothel-bar who does what she can to survive. Curtiz used cutting-edge wipes and opticals in the film. Future child star Shirley Temple appeared in a walk-on role as the daughter of the Donnelly and Littlefield characters.

== Plot ==
Russian refugee Tanya Borisoff is suddenly abandoned penniless in Rangoon by her lover, Tony Evans, when he accepts a gunrunning deal from Nick, the owner of a sleazy local nightclub. Nick made the deal hoping to get Tanya as his main "hostess," which Tanya accepts after an initial refusal, just to make the best of a bad situation.

Using the name "Spot White," she becomes notorious for her affairs, which provokes the commissioner of police to order her deported. She reminds him of a tryst he had with her and extorts 10,000 rupees from him to start a new life. Calling herself "Marjorie Lang," she leaves for Mandalay via river steamer. On board she meets alcoholic Dr. Gregory Burton, who is on his way to help in an area plagued with a deadly contagious fever.

As Tanya and Dr. Burton begin to fall in love, she learns he's seeking to make amends for once fatally operating on a patient while drunk. She decides to go with him on his medical mission so they can put their pasts behind them together. She believes that by doing this, they both may have a chance of redeeming themselves and beginning a new life together. But Tony is on the steamer too, and tries to convince Tanya he still loves her.

Tony gets a wire from Nick telling him the police are on his trail and will pick him up at the next port. He fakes taking poison and jumping overboard, then hides in the boat's hold. The steamboat Captain finds the evidence and believes Tanya murdered Tony and arrests her. At the urging of Dr. Burton and the first mate, who finds the wire, the Captain finally decides it was a suicide and frees her.

When Tony later returns to an astonished Tanya he tries to convince her to open a club with him in Mandalay, where she can prostitute herself as a "hostess" again. Through with that life, she eyes the poison still in the cabin as Tony asks her to make him a drink. After discreetly slipping poison into his drink, she hands the glass to Tony. Tony takes a drink and quickly realizes that he has been poisoned. Tanya explains that although she has loved him more than anyone else, she cannot go back to that sort of life. Tony stumbles past Tanya and falls out of an open window into the river with no one else having observed.

The next morning the steamboat arrives in Mandalay, and Tanya accompanies Dr. Burton off the ship. While disembarking, Mrs. George Peters, another passenger who Tanya had met earlier, says goodbye. Mrs. Peters, who had already heard of the Captain's decision, says that she knew Tanya didn't kill Tony, remarking "...why I told him (Mrs. Peters' husband) that you wouldn't kill a fly." Walking onto the pier alongside Dr. Burton, Tanya stares forward with mixed emotions.

== Cast ==
- Kay Francis as Tanya Borodoff
- Ricardo Cortez as Tony Evans
- Warner Oland as Nick
- Lyle Talbot as Dr. Gregory Burton
- Lucien Littlefield as George Peters
- Ruth Donnelly as Mrs. George Peters
- Reginald Owen as Police Commissioner
- Wong Chung as Chang Lee - the Silk Merchant
- Shirley Temple as Betty Shaw (scenes deleted)

== Production ==
The lead roles were initially offered to George Brent and his wife Ruth Chatterton. Chatterton turned down the role because she did not want to play a prostitute again, and Brent because he did not want to make the trip to the Stockton, California location on San Joaquin River, where the film shot for 10 days. Afterwards, Ricardo Cortez was assigned by the studio to play "Tony Evans".

== Reception ==
Although the critics did not see the film as anything better than a good "B-movie", it was well-received and was a moneymaker for the studio.

== Box office ==
According to Warner Bros records the film made a profit of $83,462.

== Bibliography ==
- Baxter, John (1968), Hollywood in the Thirties, A. Zwemmer Ltd, London, UK, ISBN 0498069273
- Edwards, Anne (1988), Shirley Temple: American Princess, New York: William Morrow and Company, Inc.
