= Divorce (1945 film) =

1945 film by William Nigh

- Directed by: William Nigh
- Written by: Sidney Sutherland (story and screenplay); Harvey Gates (screenplay)
- Produced by: Jeffrey Bernerd; Kay Francis; Trem Carr
- Starring: Kay Francis; Bruce Cabot; Helen Mack
- Cinematography: Harry Neumann
- Edited by: Richard C. Currier
- Music by: Edward J. Kay
- Production company: Monogram Pictures
- Distributed by: Monogram Pictures
- Release date: August 18, 1945
- Running time: 71 minutes
- Country: United States
- Language: English

Divorce is a 1945 American drama film directed by William Nigh and produced and distributed by Monogram Pictures. It stars Kay Francis, Bruce Cabot, and Helen Mack and follows the story of a woman who returns to her hometown after multiple divorces and becomes re-involved with a married childhood boyfriend.

== Plot summary ==
Diane, a woman who has been married and divorced five times, returns to her small hometown where she proceeds to complicate, and potentially destroy, the marriage of Bob, her childhood boyfriend.

Bob gradually falls into Diane's arms, therefore, his wife decides to get a divorce. Then, he loses touch with his family and slips deeper into Diane's web of depravity.

== Cast ==
- Kay Francis as Diane Carter
- Bruce Cabot as Bob Phillips
- Helen Mack as Martha Phillips
- Jerome Cowan as Jim Driscoll
- Craig Reynolds as Bill Endicott
- Ruth Lee as Liz Smith
- Jean Fenwick as June Endicott
- Mary Gordon as Ellen
- Larry Olsen as Michael Phillips
- Johnny Calkins as Robby Phillips
- Jonathan Hale as Judge Conlon
- Addison Richards as Plummer
- Leonard Mudie as Harvey Hicks
- Reid Kilpatrick as Dr. Andy Cole
- Virginia Wave as Secretary

== Reception ==
One New York State paper found it a “motion picture of unusual excellence, judged from any standpoint,” and continued: “Miss Francis, as the much-married divorcee of the story, is a poised, ruthless woman of the world and displays all the seductive artistry which long ago established her as a star of the first rank. Bruce Cabot is equally fine as a happily married man, a returned officer of the present war, who succumbs to the wiles of the predatory Miss Francis, and leaves his family for her. Helen Mack is outstanding as the deserted wife who fights for her rights, and others in the cast who do especially good work are Jerome Cowan, Craig Reynolds, Ruth Lee, Jean Fenwick, Mary Gordon, Jonathan Hale and Addison Richards, as well as two precocious child actors, Larry Olsen and Johnny Calkins.”
