= The House on 56th Street =

1933 film

- movie poster
- Directed by: Robert Florey
- Written by: Joseph Santley (story); Austin Parker; Sheridan Gibney
- Produced by: James Seymour
- Starring: Kay Francis; Ricardo Cortez; Gene Raymond; John Halliday; Margaret Lindsay
- Cinematography: Ernest Haller
- Edited by: Howard Bretherton
- Music by: Bernhard Kaun
- Production company: Warner Bros. Pictures
- Distributed by: Warner Bros. Pictures; The Vitaphone Corporation
- Release date: December 23, 1933
- Running time: 68-69 minutes
- Country: United States
- Language: English
- Budget: $211,000
- Box office: $694,000

The House on 56th Street is a 1933 American pre-Code drama film. The film's plot involves a miscarriage of justice, wrongful conviction and imprisonment, and alienation of a prisoner from her only living relative.

== Plot ==
A woman is sent to prison for twenty years for a murder she did not commit. When she is released, her husband is dead, and her daughter has been told Peggy is also dead.

== Cast ==
- Kay Francis as Peggy Martin Van Tyle aka Peggy Stone
- Ricardo Cortez as Bill Blaine
- Gene Raymond as Monte Van Tyle (Monty Van Tyle in the opening credits)
- John Halliday as Lyndon Fiske
- Margaret Lindsay as Eleanor Van Tyle Burgess
- Frank McHugh as Chester Hunt
- William "Stage" Boyd as Mr. Bonelli (as William Boyd)
- Hardie Albright as Henry Burgess
- Sheila Terry as Dolly
- Phillip Reed as Freddy
- Walter Walker as Dr. Wyman
- Nella Walker as Eleanor Van Tyle

== Reception ==
According to Warner Bros records, the film earned $410,000 in the U.S. and Canada and $284,000 elsewhere.
