= Kay Francis =

American actress (1905–1968)

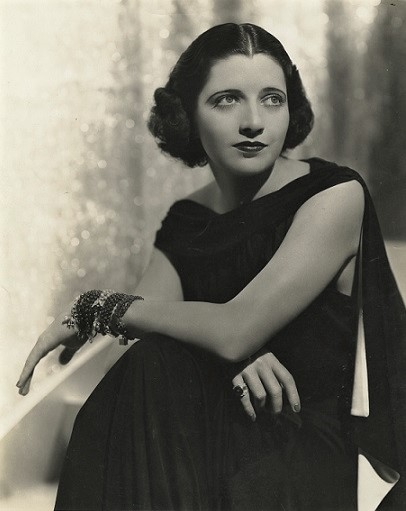
- Francis in 1935
- Born: Katharine Edwina Gibbs; January 13, 1905; Oklahoma City, Oklahoma Territory, U.S.
- Died: August 26, 1968 (aged 63); New York City, U.S.
- Occupation: Actress
- Years active: 1925–1951
- Known for: Trouble in Paradise; The House on 56th Street
- Spouses: James Dwight Francis (m. 1922; div. 1925) William Gaston (m. 1925; div. 1927) Kenneth MacKenna (m. 1931; div. 1934)

Kay Francis (born Katharine Edwina Gibbs; January 13, 1905 – August 26, 1968) was an American stage and film actress. After a brief period on Broadway in the late 1920s, she moved to film and achieved her greatest success between 1930 and 1936, when she was the number one female star and highest-paid actress at Warner Bros. studio. She adopted her mother's maiden name (Francis) as her professional surname.

== Early life ==
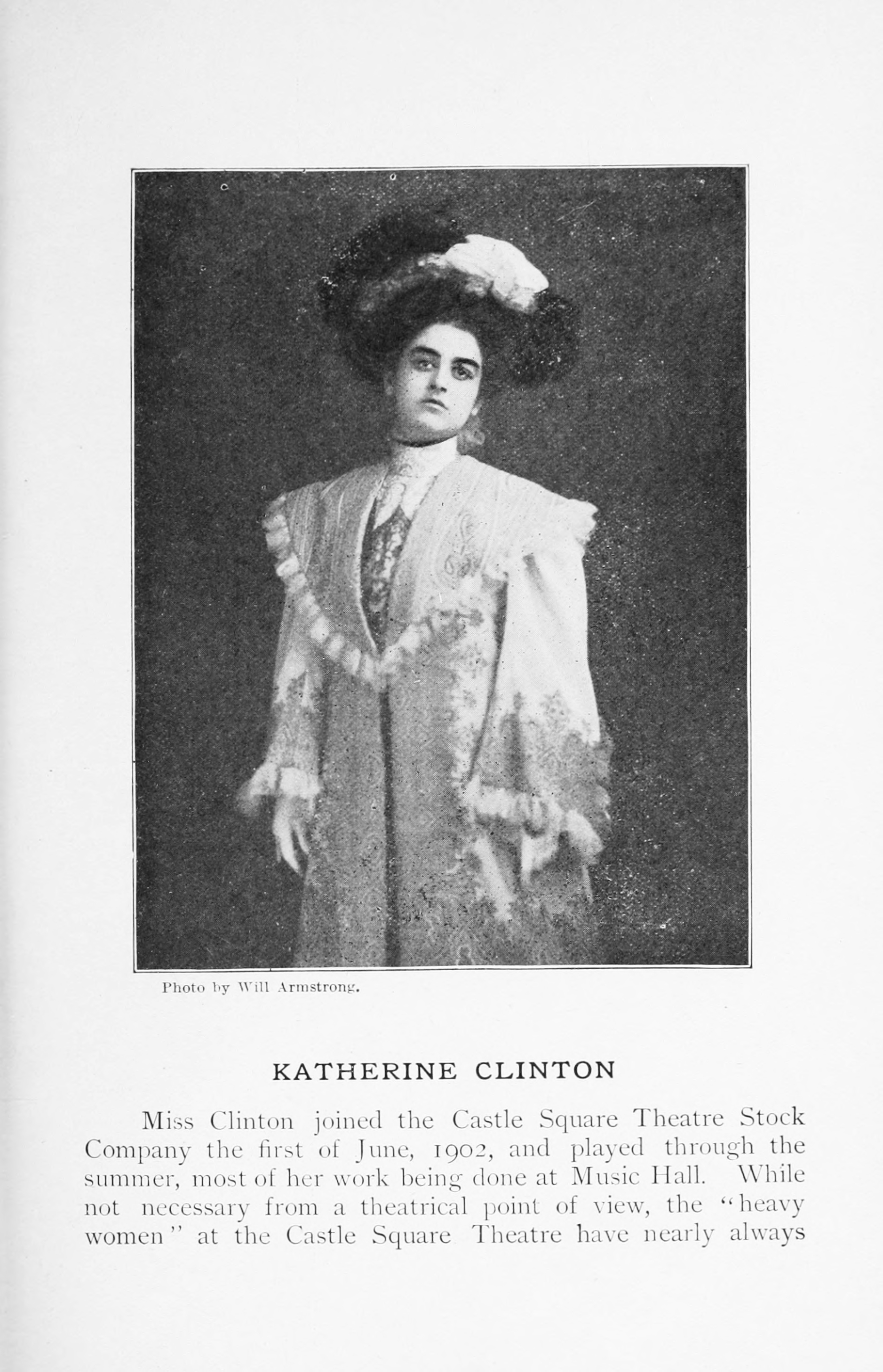
Francis’ mother Katherine Clinton, c. 1902

Katharine Edwina Gibbs was born in Oklahoma City, Oklahoma Territory (present-day Oklahoma), in 1905, the only child of Joseph Sprague Gibbs and Katharine Clinton Gibbs (née Francis), an actress. Wed in 1903, her parents divorced in 1909 when Kay's mother left her alcoholic father and took Kay with her.

Her mother had been born in Nova Scotia, Canada, and was a successful actress and singer on a hardscrabble theatrical circuit under the stage name Katherine Clinton. Kay often traveled with her mother. Kay attended Catholic schools when it was affordable, becoming a student at the Institute of the Holy Angels at age five. After also attending Miss Fuller's School for Young Ladies in Ossining, New York (1919) and the Cathedral School (1920), she enrolled at the Katharine Gibbs Secretarial School in New York City. While there she did nothing to discourage the assumption that her mother was Katharine Gibbs, the pioneering American businesswoman who had established the Gibbs chain of vocational schools.

In 1922, 17-year-old Kay was engaged to James Dwight Francis, a well-to-do man from Pittsfield, Massachusetts. Their marriage, at New York's Saint Thomas Church, ended in divorce three years later.

== Stage career ==
In the spring of 1925, Francis went to Paris to get a divorce. While there, she was courted by Bill Gaston, a former athlete at Harvard and member of the Boston Bar Association. Secretly married in October 1925, their marriage was short-lived, with only occasional visits between Bill in Boston and Kay in New York City following her mother's footsteps onto the stage.

She made her Broadway debut as the Player Queen in a modern-dress version of Shakespeare's Hamlet in November 1925. She often "borrowed" wardrobe for fashionable nights out in New York that were reported on by the day's press. Francis claimed she got the part by "lying a lot, to the right people". One of them was producer Stuart Walker, who hired her to join his Portmanteau Theatre Company. She soon found herself commuting between Dayton and Cincinnati, Ohio, and Indianapolis, Indiana. She played wisecracking secretaries, saucy French floozies, walk-ons, bit parts, and heavies.

By February 1927, Francis returned to New York and got a part in the Broadway play Crime. A teenage Sylvia Sidney had its lead, but later said that Francis stole the show.

After Francis's divorce from Gaston in September 1927, she became engaged to society playboy Alan Ryan Jr. She promised his family that she would not return to the stage – a vow that lasted only a few months before she was playing an aviator in a Rachel Crothers play, Venus.

Francis appeared in only one other Broadway production, titled Elmer the Great in 1928. Written by Ring Lardner, produced by George M. Cohan, and starring Walter Huston, the play nonetheless flopped. Though flat broke at the time, Francis was unwilling to ask friends for help and determined to "crawl out of this mess herself".

Huston had been impressed by Francis's performance and encouraged her to take a screen test for his new studio, Paramount Pictures, and the film Gentlemen of the Press (1929). Paramount offered her a starting contract of $300 per week for five weeks. Francis made Press and the Marx Brothers film The Cocoanuts (1929) at Paramount's Astoria Studios in Astoria, Queens, New York before moving to Hollywood.

== Film career ==
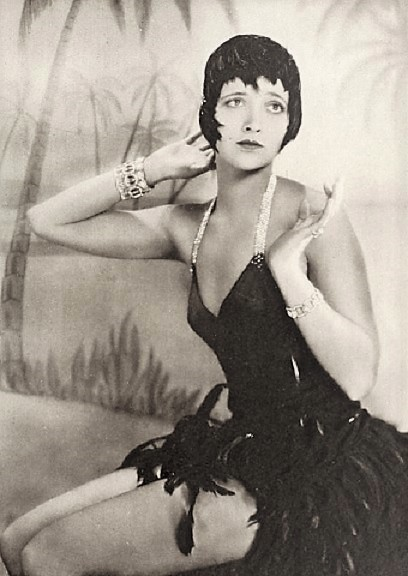
Francis in a 1930 Paramount Studios publicity photo by Otto Dyar

Major film studios, which had formerly been based in New York, had relocated successfully to California. With the coming of sound pictures, even more Broadway actors were enticed to Hollywood, including Ann Harding, Aline MacMahon, Helen Twelvetrees, Spencer Tracy, Paul Muni, Barbara Stanwyck, Humphrey Bogart, James Cagney, Joan Blondell and Leslie Howard.

Signed to a featured players contract with Paramount Pictures, Francis also made the move and created an immediate impression. She frequently co-starred with William Powell, first teaming in Street of Chance (1930) when David Selznick fought for the pairing after having seen Francis briefly in Behind the Make-up (1930). It worked, and they appeared in as many as six to eight movies together per year, making a total of 21 films between 1930 and 1932.

Francis's career flourished at Paramount in spite of a slight, but distinctive rhotacism (she pronounced the letter "r" as "w") that gave rise to the nickname "Wavishing Kay Fwancis". She appeared in George Cukor's "thrillingly amoral comedy" Girls About Town (1931) and 24 Hours (1931). On December 16, 1931, Francis and her co-stars opened the newly constructed art deco Paramount Theatre in Oakland, California, with a gala preview screening of The False Madonna.

In 1932, Francis's career at Paramount changed gears when Warner Bros. promised her star status at a better salary of $4,000 a week. Paramount sued Warner Bros. over the loss. Warner Bros. persuaded both Francis and Powell to join the ranks of their stars, along with Ruth Chatterton. After her first three featured roles had been as a villainess, Francis was given roles with a more sympathetic screen persona, such as in The False Madonna, where she plays a jaded society woman who learns the importance of hearth and home when nursing a terminally ill child. After Francis's career skyrocketed at Warner Bros., she was loaned back to Paramount for Ernst Lubitsch's Trouble in Paradise (1932).

=== Mainstream successes ===
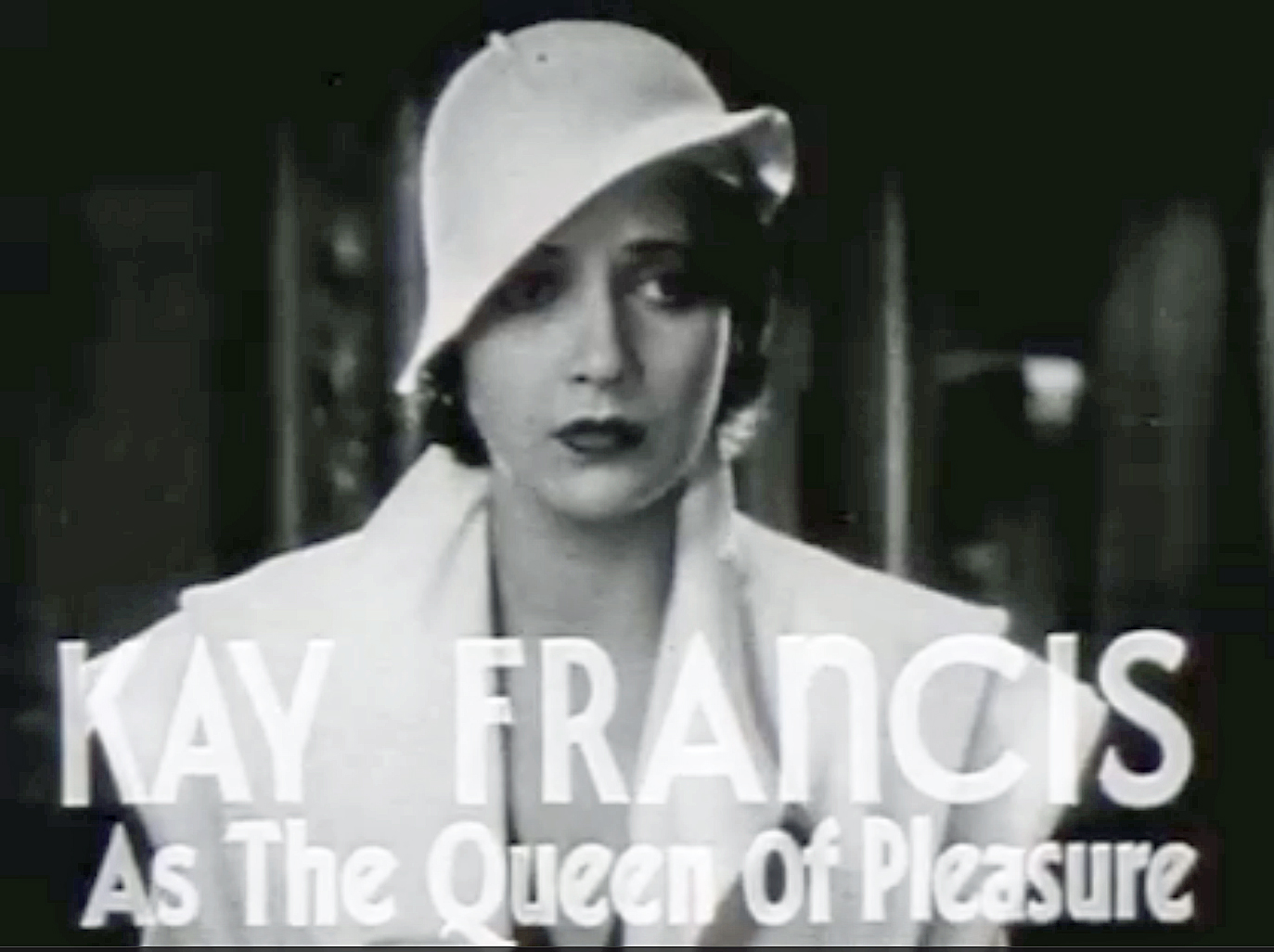
The House on 56th Street (1933) trailer

From 1932 through 1936, Francis was the queen of the Warner Bros. lot, and, increasingly, her films were developed as star vehicles. By 1935, Francis was one of the highest-paid actors, earning a yearly salary of $115,000, dwarfing the $18,000 Bette Davis – who would one day occupy Francis's dressing room – made. From 1930 to 1937, Francis appeared on the covers of 38 film magazines, second only to child sensation Shirley Temple's 138.

Soon after her arrival in Hollywood, she began an affair with actor and producer Kenneth MacKenna, whom she married in January 1931. MacKenna's Hollywood career foundered, having spent more time in New York with the couple's amicable 1933 separation; they divorced in 1934.

Francis frequently played long-suffering heroines, in films such as I Found Stella Parish, Secrets of an Actress, and Comet Over Broadway, displaying to good advantage lavish wardrobes that, in some cases, were more memorable than the characters she played – a fact often emphasized by contemporary film reviewers. As a troubled doctor in Mary Stevens, M.D. (1933) and a prostitute trying to escape her past in Mandalay (1934), Francis co-starred with Lyle Talbot, a fellow Warner Bros. contract player. As Belinda in Give Me Your Heart (1936) with co-stars George Brent and Roland Young, her performance had "reticence and pathos" and garnered welcoming reviews from The New York Times.

In October 1937, Francis met aviation businessman Raven Freiherr von Barnekow at a party of Countess Dorothy Dentice di Frasso's in Beverly Hills. In March 1938, Louella Parsons reported on their intended marriage and that Francis would retire from films, but by October the two were traveling separately and Francis was still acting; by December, Barnekow had returned to Germany.

Francis's clothes horse reputation and statuesque frame often led Warners' producers to concentrate resources on lavish sets and costumes rather than the quality of the storylines, a move designed to appeal to Depression-era female audiences and capitalize on her reputation as the epitome of chic. Eventually, Francis herself became dissatisfied with these vehicles and began openly to feud with Warner Bros., even threatening a lawsuit against them for inferior scripts and treatment. This, in turn, led to her demotion to programmers, such as Women in the Wind (1939), and, in the same year, to the termination of her contract.

=== "Box Office Poison" and revival ===
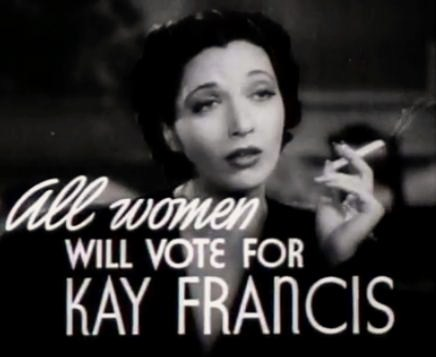
In First Lady (1937) trailer

The Independent Theatre Owners Association paid for an advertisement in The Hollywood Reporter in May 1938 that included Francis, along with Greta Garbo, Joan Crawford, Fred Astaire, Mae West, Katharine Hepburn and others, on a list of stars dubbed "box office poison". After her release from Warner Bros., she was unable to secure another studio contract. Carole Lombard, who had been a supporting player in Francis's 1931 film Ladies' Man, insisted Francis be cast in her film In Name Only (1939). Francis had a supporting role to Lombard and Cary Grant, and it offered her an opportunity to engage in some serious acting. After this, she moved to supporting parts in other films, playing fast-talking, professional women – holding her own against Rosalind Russell in The Feminine Touch, for example – and mothers opposite rising young stars such as Deanna Durbin.

Francis had one lead role at the end of the decade opposite Humphrey Bogart in the gangster film King of the Underworld, released in 1939. The movie was a remake of Paul Muni's Dr. Socrates (1935), with Francis in the role of a doctor who is forced to treat Bogart's injured gangster character and then gets caught up with the law. Originally titled Lady Doctor, the film was shelved, then retitled Unlawful for reshoots to beef up Bogart's role. By the film's release, Warner Bros. had again changed titles to King of the Underworld, while demoting Francis to second billing.

=== World War II era ===
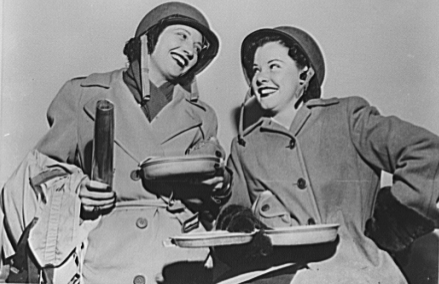
Kay Francis and Mitzi Mayfair from Four Jills in a Jeep (1944)

With the start of World War II, Francis joined the war effort, doing volunteer work with the Naval Aid Auxiliary, where she was named head of the NAA's Hospital Unit. She also performed extensive war-zone touring, first chronicled in the book Four Jills in a Jeep, written by fellow volunteer Carole Landis. It became a popular 1944 film, Four Jills in a Jeep, with a cavalcade of stars and Martha Raye and Mitzi Mayfair joining Landis and Francis to fill out the complement of Jills.

At the end of the war, Four Jills was given a four-star production by 20th Century Fox, but still needed distribution through Monogram, and the decade found Francis virtually unemployable in Hollywood. She signed a three-film contract with Poverty Row studio Monogram Pictures that gave her production credit as well as star billing. The resulting films - Divorce, Wife Wanted and Allotment Wives - had limited releases in 1945 and 1946.

Francis spent the remainder of the 1940s on the stage, appearing with some success in State of the Union and touring in various productions of plays, old and new, including Windy Hill, backed by former Warner Bros. colleague Ruth Chatterton. Declining health, aggravated by an accident in Columbus, Ohio during a tour of State of the Union in 1948, when she was badly burned by a radiator after passing out from an accidental overdose from pills, hastened her retirement from show business. This incident was first reported as a fainting spell brought on by the pills, with a complication of respiratory infection. Her manager and traveling companion had arrived at Francis's hotel room and, in an attempt to revive the unconscious actress with fresh air, burned her legs on the radiator near the window. She recovered in an oxygen tent at the local hospital; soon retiring from acting and then, public life.

== Personal life ==
"My life? Well, I get up at a quarter to six in the morning if I'm going to wear an evening dress on camera. That sentence sounds a little ga-ga, doesn't it? But never mind, that's my life ... As long as they pay me my salary, they can give me a broom and I'll sweep the stage. I don't give a damn. I want the money ... When I die, I want to be cremated so that no sign of my existence is left on this earth. I can't wait to be forgotten."

— From Kay Francis's private diaries, c. 1938.

Francis married three times, to James Dwight Francis (1922–1925); William Gaston (1925–1927); and Kenneth MacKenna (1931–1934). It was erroneously reported by Walter Winchell that her third had been to screenwriter John Meehan around 1929. She had affairs with Maurice Chevalier and Raven Freiherr von Barnekow.

Her diaries, which are preserved along with her film-related material in an academic collection at Wesleyan University open to scholars and researchers, paint a picture of a woman whose personal life was often in disarray. She regularly socialized with gay men - one of whom, Anderson Lawler, was reportedly paid $10,000 by Warner Bros. to accompany her to Europe in 1934.

In 1966, Francis was diagnosed with breast cancer and underwent a mastectomy, but the cancer had already spread. She died in 1968, aged 63. Her body was cremated per her request and according to her will her ashes were to be disposed of "how the undertaker sees fit."

Having no living immediate family members, Francis left more than $1 million to The Seeing Eye, an organization in New Jersey, which trains guide dogs for the blind.

== Filmography ==
=== Features ===
Year	Title	Role	Notes
1929	Gentlemen of the Press	Myra May	
1929	The Cocoanuts	Penelope	
1929	Dangerous Curves	Zara Flynn	
1929	Illusion	Zelda Paxton	
1929	The Marriage Playground	Lady Wrench	
1930	Behind the Make-Up	Kitty Parker	
1930	Street of Chance	Alma Marsden	
1930	Paramount on Parade	Carmen	Episode: "The Toreador"
1930	A Notorious Affair	Countess Olga Balakireff	
1930	For the Defense	Irene Manners	
1930	Raffles	Gwen	
1930	Let's Go Native	Constance Cook	
1930	The Virtuous Sin	Marya Ivanova Sablin	
1930	Passion Flower	Dulce Morado	
1931	Scandal Sheet	Edith Flint	
1931	Ladies' Man	Norma Page	
1931	The Vice Squad	Alice Morrison	
1931	Transgression	Elsie Maury	
1931	Guilty Hands	Marjorie West	
1931	24 Hours	Fanny Towner	
1931	Girls About Town	Wanda Howard	
1931	The False Madonna	Tina	
1932	Strangers in Love	Diana Merrow	
1932	Man Wanted	Lois Ames	
1932	Street of Women	Natalie 'Nat' Upton	
1932	Jewel Robbery	Baroness Teri	
1932	One Way Passage	Joan Ames	
1932	Trouble in Paradise	Madame Mariette Colet	
1932	Cynara	Clemency Warlock	
1933	The Keyhole	Anne Vallee Brooks	
1933	Storm at Daybreak	Irina Radovic	
1933	Mary Stevens, M.D.	Mary Stevens	
1933	I Loved a Woman	Laura McDonald	
1933	The House on 56th Street	Peggy Martin	
1934	Mandalay	Tanya Borodoff / Spot White / Marjorie Lang	
1934	Wonder Bar	Liane	
1934	Dr. Monica	Monica Braden	
1934	British Agent	Elena Moura	
1935	Living on Velvet	Amy Prentiss	
1935	Stranded	Lynn Palmer	
1935	The Goose and the Gander	Georgiana	
1935	I Found Stella Parish	Stella Parish	
1936	The White Angel	Florence 'Flo' Nightingale	
1936	Give Me Your Heart	Belinda Warren	
1937	Stolen Holiday	Nicole Picot	
1937	Another Dawn	Julia Ashton Wister	
1937	Confession	Vera Kowalska	
1937	First Lady	Lucy Chase Wayne	
1938	Women Are Like That	Claire Landin	
1938	My Bill	Mary Colbrook	
1938	Secrets of an Actress	Fay Carter	
1938	Comet Over Broadway	Eve Appleton	
1939	King of the Underworld	Carol Nelson	
1939	Women in the Wind	Janet Steele	
1939	In Name Only	Maida Walker	
1940	It's a Date	Georgia Drake	
1940	When the Daltons Rode	Julie King	
1940	Little Men	Jo	
1941	Play Girl	Grace Herbert	
1941	The Man Who Lost Himself	Adrienne Scott	
1941	Charley's Aunt	Donna Lucia d'Alvadorez	
1941	The Feminine Touch	Nellie Woods	
1942	Always in My Heart	Marjorie Scott	
1942	Between Us Girls	Christine 'Chris' Bishop	
1944	Four Jills in a Jeep	Herself	
1945	Divorce	Dianne Carter	
1945	Allotment Wives	Sheila Seymour	
1946	Wife Wanted	Carole Raymond	

=== Short subjects ===
- Screen Snapshots Series 16, No. 3 (1936) as Herself – Observer
- Show Business at War (1943, Documentary) as Herself (uncredited)

== Bibliography ==
- The Women of Warner Brothers: The Lives and Careers of 15 Leading Ladies with Filmographies for Each (Performing Arts). Daniel Bubbeo. MacFarland & Co., 2001. ISBN 0786411376, ISBN 978-0786411375
- Callahan, Dan, Kay Francis: Secrets of an Actress, Bright Lights Film Journal, May 2006. Retrieved December 4, 2006
- Nemeth, Michael. "Alluring Lady", Classic Images. September 2022
- Kear, Lynn; Rossman, John (2006). Kay Francis: A Passionate Life and Career. McFarland & Company. ISBN 0-7864-2366-8.
- Kear, Lynn; Rossman, John (2007). The Complete Kay Francis Career Record. McFarland. ISBN 978-1-4766-0287-5.
- O'Brien, Scott (2006). Kay Francis: I Can't Wait to Be Forgotten. BearManor Media. ISBN 1-59393-036-4.
- 1910 United States Federal Census, Fort Lee, Bergen County, New Jersey, Election District 11
