= Monogram Pictures =

Former film studio

- Industry: Entertainment
- Founded: 1931; 95 years ago (original); 1946; 80 years ago (as a predecessor-in-interest to Allied Artists Pictures Corporation)
- Founders: W. Ray Johnston; Trem Carr
- Defunct: 1953; 73 years ago (original); 1979; 47 years ago (as Allied Artists Pictures Corporation)
- Headquarters: Los Angeles, California; New York City, New York
- Key people: Yaniv Raphael Bar (Chairman and President); Jared Safier (CEO)
- Products: Motion pictures
- Website: monogrampictures.com

Monogram Pictures Corporation was an American film studio that produced mostly low-budget films between 1931 and 1953, when the firm completed a transition to the name Allied Artists Pictures Corporation. Monogram was among the minor studios in the golden age of Hollywood, generally referred to collectively as Poverty Row. Of the 11 permanent studios in Hollywood at the time, ranked in order of size, MGM was #1—and Monogram was #10 (the only one smaller was PRC).

The Monogram trademark is now owned by Allied Artists International. The original sprawling brick complex which functioned as home to both Monogram and Allied Artists remains at 4376 W Sunset Blvd, as part of the Church of Scientology Media Center (formerly KCET's television facilities).

== Early years ==
Monogram's antecedent was W. Ray Johnston's Rayart Pictures, specializing in silent western and action features. In 1929 Johnston entered the new field of sound pictures, with Rayart releasing the first feature-length talking western Overland Bound, featuring silent stars Leo Maloney and Allene Ray. Johnston renamed his company Raytone, then Continental Pictures, then Syndicate Pictures, and finally (in March 1931) Monogram Pictures. Johnston was president, with his Rayart colleague Trem Carr as vice president.

Johnston made an honest effort to compete with the larger companies in the early 1930s. When movie programs consisted of a single feature film plus short subjects, Monogram's features could and did compete with major-studio productions on America's screens. Under Johnston, Monogram offered a variety of reasonably priced features for the Depression-era exhibitors, including adaptations of famous books and plays; gangster stories; jungle thrillers; topical comedies; romances; and westerns. During its first few years Monogram could seldom afford big-name movie stars and would employ either former silent-film actors who were idle (Clara Kimball Young, William Farnum, Herbert Rawlinson, William Collier, Sr.) or young featured players (Ray Walker, Wallace Ford, William Cagney, Charles Starrett). By 1934 the studio attracted bigger names: Colin Clive, Virginia Bruce, Mary Brian, Robert Armstrong, Mary Carlisle, Marian Marsh, and Frank Craven.

In 1935, Johnston and Carr were wooed by Herbert Yates of Consolidated Film Industries. Yates merged Monogram with several other smaller independent companies to form Republic Pictures. Johnston and Carr remained with the new venture only briefly before clashing with Yates and leaving the company. Carr moved to Universal Pictures, while Johnston reactivated Monogram in 1937.

== New direction ==
By 1937, double features had become popular and the major studios were supplying their own low-cost fare. Monogram and Johnston now concentrated on producing films for independent theaters and smaller neighborhood moviehouses that couldn't afford big-studio rental rates. Monogram became a reliable "budget brand" for cost-conscious exhibitors. There was a corresponding decrease in prestige, but Johnston had made many friends in the industry and was content to serve his own customer base.

== Film series ==
In 1938, Monogram began a long and profitable policy of making series and hiring familiar players to star in them. Frankie Darro, Hollywood's foremost tough-kid actor of the 1930s, joined Monogram and stayed with the company until 1950. Comedian Mantan Moreland co-starred in many of the Darro films and continued to be a valuable asset to Monogram through 1949. Juvenile actors Marcia Mae Jones and Jackie Moran co-starred in series of homespun romances, and then joined the Frankie Darro series.

Boris Karloff contributed to the Monogram release schedule with his Mr. Wong mysteries. This prompted producer Sam Katzman to engage Bela Lugosi for a follow-up series of Monogram thrillers.

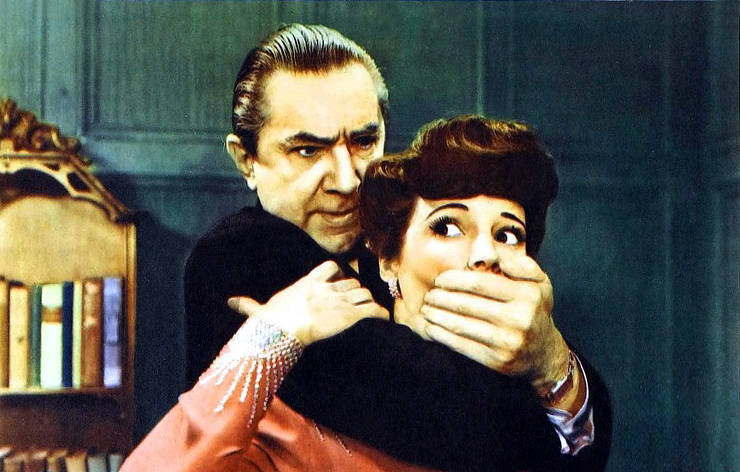
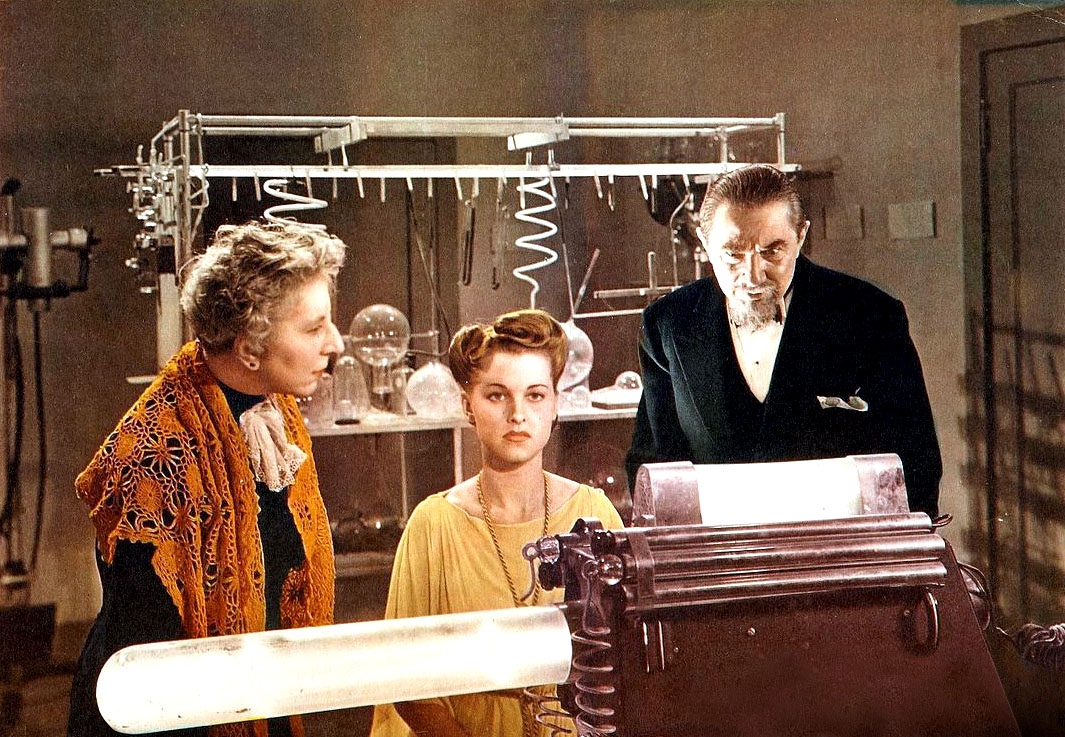
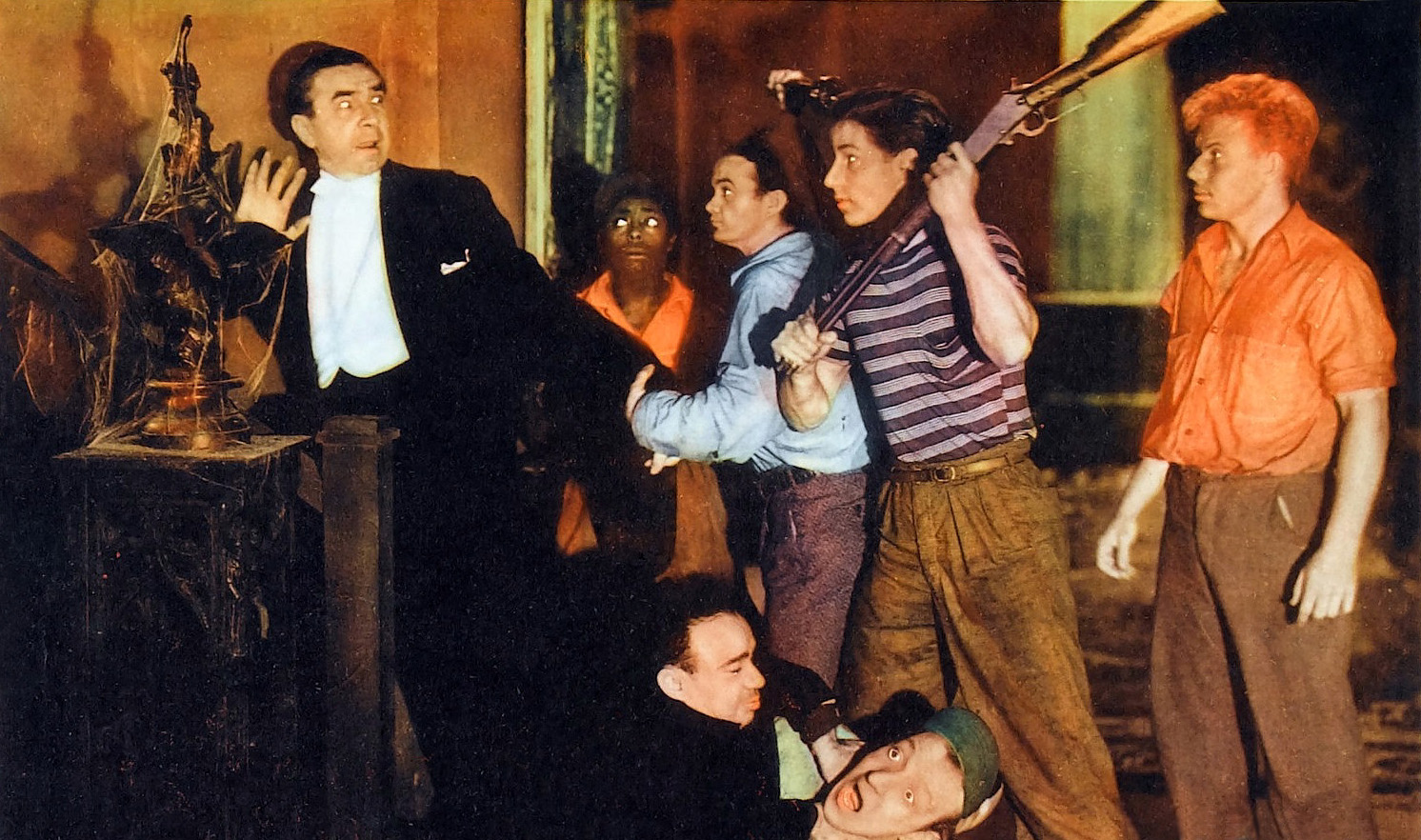
Bela Lugosi appeared in a string of Monogram productions throughout the 1940s.

Katzman's street-gang series The East Side Kids was an imitation of the then-popular Dead End Kids features. The first film cast six juveniles who had no connection with the Dead End series, but Katzman signed Dead End Kids Bobby Jordan and Leo Gorcey, and soon added Huntz Hall and Gabriel Dell from the original gang. The East Side Kids series ran from 1940 to 1945. East Side star Gorcey then took the reins himself and transformed the series into The Bowery Boys, which became the longest-running feature-film comedy series in movie history (48 titles over 12 years).

Monogram continued to experiment with film series with mixed results. Definite box-office hits were Charlie Chan, The Cisco Kid, and Joe Palooka, all proven movie properties abandoned by other studios and revived by Monogram. Less successful were the comic-strip exploits of Snuffy Smith and Sam Katzman's comedy series teaming Billy Gilbert, Shemp Howard, and Maxie Rosenbloom.

Many of Monogram's series were westerns. The backbone of the studio's early days was a father-son partnership: writer/director Robert N. Bradbury and cowboy actor Bob Steele (born Robert A. Bradbury). Bradbury wrote almost all of the early Monogram and Lone Star westerns and directed many of them himself. Independent producer Paul Malvern produced 16 Lone Star western productions starring John Wayne, releasing through Monogram. The studio also released sagebrush sagas with Bill Cody, Tom Keene, Tim McCoy, Tex Ritter, and Jack Randall before hitting on the "trio" format teaming veteran saddle pals. Buck Jones, Tim McCoy, and Raymond Hatton became The Rough Riders; Ray (Crash) Corrigan, John "Dusty" King, and Max Terhune were The Range Busters, and Ken Maynard, Hoot Gibson, and Bob Steele teamed as The Trail Blazers. When Universal Pictures allowed Johnny Mack Brown's contract to lapse, Monogram grabbed him and kept him busy through 1952.

== Monogram's stars ==
The studio was a launching pad for new stars Preston Foster in Sensation Hunters, Randolph Scott in Broken Dreams, Ginger Rogers in The Thirteenth Guest, Lionel Atwill in The Sphinx, Alan Ladd in Her First Romance, Robert Mitchum in When Strangers Marry. The studio was also a haven for established stars whose careers had stalled: Jackie Cooper in Boy of the Streets (Cooper would work for Monogram off and on through 1948), Edith Fellows and Jacqueline Wells in Her First Romance, Harry Langdon in Double Trouble, Grace Hayes in Zis Boom Bah, James Dunn in The Living Ghost, Edmund Lowe in Klondike Fury, John Boles in Road to Happiness, Ricardo Cortez in I Killed That Man, Frank Fay in Spotlight Scandals, Simone Simon in Johnny Doesn't Live Here Anymore, Kay Francis and Bruce Cabot in Divorce, Robert Lowery and Marjorie Weaver in Fashion Model, Jane Frazee in Incident, and Roddy McDowall in Kidnapped.

Monogram Pictures was regarded within the industry as a minor-league studio. Former character actor Bill Kennedy recalled, "If you were an actor on the way up, like Robert Mitchum or Alan Ladd, working at Monogram was okay—no stigma. But—if you were already a star at a big studio like Fox or Paramount and then went to Monogram, a la Edmund Lowe, it was the kiss of death."

Monogram did create and nurture its own stars. Gale Storm began her career at RKO Radio Pictures in 1940 but found a home at Monogram. Storm had been promoted from Monogram's Frankie Darro series and was showcased in crime dramas (like The Crime Smasher (1943) opposite Richard Cromwell and radio's Frank Graham in the title role) and a string of musicals to capitalize on her singing talents (like Campus Rhythm and Nearly Eighteen (both 1943), as well as Swing Parade of 1946 featuring The Three Stooges). Another of Monogram's finds during this time was British skating star Belita, who conversely starred in musical revues first and then graduated to dramatic roles, including Suspense (1946), an A-budget King Brothers Productions picture released under the Monogram name. Monogram's final leading-lady discovery was Jane Nigh, who starred in several wholesome outdoor stories between 1950 and 1952; she returned to the studio in 1957 for a Bowery Boys comedy.

== Personal projects at Monogram ==
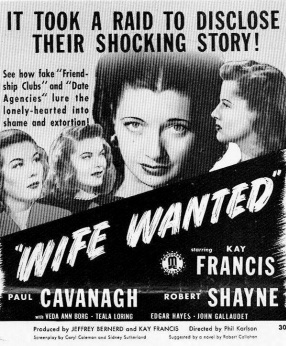
Poster for the movie Wife Wanted (1946), featuring star Kay Francis and other cast members

Monogram was also a useful outlet for ambitious movie stars who wanted to produce their own films. Buck Jones, Sidney Toler, Kay Francis, The Three Stooges, Leo Gorcey, and Arthur Lake all pursued independent production, releasing through Monogram.

So did Lou Costello, who produced Monogram's musical comedy A WAVE, a WAC, and a Marine (released 1944), and was set to direct the East Side Kids comedy Block Busters (1944) under the pseudonym "Lucas Tello". Costello was off the screen at the time (late 1943), idle with rheumatic fever, and his behind-the-scenes activity at Monogram may have been his way of keeping busy without exposing himself to the demands of physical comedy. When his Monogram sideline came to light, he shrugged it off as a joke. A Variety report headlined "Costello's Director Gag (Lucas Tello) Upsets Three Studios" explained: "It started as a gag at Monogram and wound up in a case of jitters at Universal, where the execs went into an apoplectic huddle and declared it wasn't true. ... Story originated in a kidding way among the East Siders, who are friends of the chubby comic. Add to that, Trem Carr, Monogram producer, is one of Costello's neighbors. The gag grew until it reached the ears of Universal" and MGM, both being Costello's principal employers. So ended Lou Costello's brief tenure at Monogram.

== Trademarks ==
For most of its existence, Monogram's emblem was a simple circular logo, with the outside of the circle ornamented by stars and the inner circle containing the initials M P C (Monogram Pictures Corporation). During its early years Monogram used an animated logo of a streamlined train passing through a modern metropolis, with "Monogram Pictures" trailing behind the train. During the mid-1940s Monogram sometimes used an animated end title: instead of "The End", the film closed with "A Monogram Picture", with the word "Monogram" being "signed" in longhand across the screen.

== Improved productions ==
Steve Broidy, Monogram's vice president and general sales manager since 1940, had been taking on additional responsibility for the studio's production schedule, and he was named president of the company in 1945. Founder Ray Johnston became chairman of the board, a position he held until 1963.

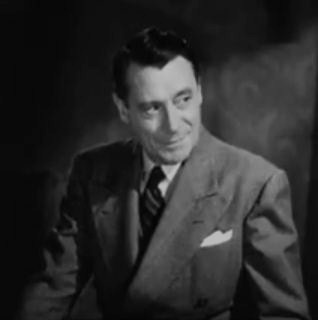
Eduardo Ciannelli in Dillinger

Under Broidy, Monogram very nearly hit the big time with Dillinger, a sensationalized crime drama that was a runaway success in 1945, making more than $1 million ($18 million in 2026) at the box office. Filmed by King Brothers Productions, it received an Academy Award nomination for Best Original Screenplay. (The only Monogram release to win an Academy Award was Climbing the Matterhorn, a two-reel adventure that won the "Best Short Subject" Oscar in 1947. Other Monogram films to receive Oscar nominations were King of the Zombies for Best Music (Music Score of a Dramatic Picture) in 1941 and Flat Top for Best Film Editing in 1952.)

Monogram followed Dillinger with several "exploitation" melodramas cashing in on topical themes, like Black Market Babies (1946, about illegal traffic in adoptions) and Allotment Wives (1946, about women marrying servicemen for their federal allotment checks).

In May 1945 Monogram announced it would make 28 features and 16 Westerns over 1945–1946; the following year brought 32 features and 16 westerns. Some of these had higher budgets than usual: Sweetheart of Sigma Chi, High Conquest, Wife Wanted, and Ginger. Monogram's fortunes continued to improve—the studio's slogan in 1946 was "Make Way for Monogram"—but Monogram never became a respectable "major" studio like former poverty-row denizen Columbia Pictures.

With Hollywood's larger studios curtailing B-picture production in favor of more prestigious and more expensive pictures, there was now a greater need for low-priced pictures that theater owners could afford. Major first-run theater chains that had never played Monogram's budget movies—as well as small, independent theaters that depended on bargain-rate films to turn a profit—began using Monogram features on a regular basis. The Charlie Chan pictures were the first Monogram products to be programmed regularly by big-city chains, giving Monogram valuable exposure in the larger market. The casting in Monogram features improved tremendously after the war, because scores of actors found themselves unemployed or underemployed when their home studios now made fewer movies. Major-studio talent began accepting work at Monogram, which gave the studio's films more prestige and box-office value.

Monogram continued to launch new series. In 1946 The East Side Kids became The Bowery Boys under a new producer, Jan Grippo. The former producer, Sam Katzman, began a new musical-comedy series called "The Teen Agers" (1946–1948) as a vehicle for singer Freddie Stewart. Other series included the Cisco Kid westerns (1945–1947); the exploits of masked crimefighter The Shadow with Kane Richmond (1946); the Bringing Up Father comedies (1946–1950) based on the George McManus comic strip, featuring Joe Yule and Renie Riano as "Jiggs and Maggie; the "Joe Palooka" prizefight comedies (1946–1951); the Roddy McDowall series (1948–1952), with the juvenile lead forsaking child roles for dramatic and action vehicles; the "Henry" series of small-town comedies (1949–1951) co-starring Raymond Walburn and Walter Catlett; and the "Bomba, the Jungle Boy" adventures (1949–1955) starring Johnny Sheffield (formerly "Boy" of the Tarzan films).

The studio's biggest drawing cards were the Bowery Boys, Charlie Chan, and the Monogram westerns (now featuring Johnny Mack Brown, Jimmy Wakely, and Whip Wilson). Monogram filmed some of its later features in Cinecolor, mostly outdoor subjects like County Fair, Blue Grass of Kentucky, and The Rose Bowl Story, as well as the science-fiction film Flight to Mars (1952).

== Creation of Allied Artists Productions ==
Producer Walter Mirisch began at Monogram after World War II as assistant to studio head Steve Broidy. He convinced Broidy that the days of low-budget films were ending, and in 1946 Monogram created a new unit, Allied Artists Productions, to make costlier films. The new name was meant to mirror the name of United Artists by evoking images of "creative personnel uniting to produce and distribute quality films".

At a time when the average Hollywood picture cost about $800,000 ($12 million in 2026) and the average Monogram picture cost about $90,000 ($1,300,000 in 2026), Allied Artists' first release, the Christmas-themed comedy It Happened on 5th Avenue (1947), cost more than $1,200,000 ($18 million in 2026). It was rewarded with an estimated $1.8 million boxoffice return. Subsequent Allied Artists releases were more economical. Some were filmed in black-and-white, while others were filmed in Cinecolor and Technicolor.

Monogram continued to be the parent company; the "Allied Artists Productions" all bore Monogram copyright notices, and were released through Monogram's network of film exchanges. The studio's new deluxe division permitted what Mirisch called "B-plus" pictures, which were released along with Monogram's established line of B fare.

Despite the studio's ambitions, however, the company's balance sheets were troubling. Monogram posted a loss of $980,000 in 1948, then a loss of $1,108,433 in 1949, and a loss of $263,342 in 1950. The deluxe division was draining the company's finances. In May 1950 Monogram announced that the average budget for an Allied Artists production would be $350,000, down from $750,000.

== "Monogram Week" ==
Monogram's three-year record of disappointing financial returns prompted a drastic, aggressive program in 1951, targeting all exhibitors. The studio revived a promotional campaign that Ray Johnston had used in 1939: "Monogram Week", with the goal of a Monogram subject being seen on every screen in America. It was an ambitious idea in 1939 and was even more audacious in 1951, when Monogram was competing with both major motion pictures and television. Stanley Kane, an outspoken representative of exhibitors' interests, approved of the idea: "This writer studiously tries to keep this bulletin from serving as an advertising medium for any film company, but we do think that Monogram Week, February 11–17, deserves a boost. During this week, Monogram is trying to get a Monogram release on every screen in America. This will be impossible, of course, in many situations with the usual run of Monogram product. However, the good old Our Gang comedies are being reissued [by Monogram] under the trade name of Little Rascals. They have played every big and little theatre in the country. If any exhibitor cannot cooperate by playing a feature during Monogram Week, one of the Little Rascals series [of short subjects] will help make the week a success."

"Monogram Week" of 1951 was highly successful, as Steve Broidy confirmed: "The outstanding results attained during Monogram Week have established new records for the company. The spontaneous outpouring of cooperation and goodwill on the part of all exhibitors, from the smallest independent on up to the biggest circuits, has proven most heartwarming to all of us. The return was limited only by the number of prints in our exchanges." America's showmen booked both new and old Monogram subjects, dating back to 1945's Dillinger, and the one-week promotion actually lasted three weeks. "Monogram Week" renewed exhibitors' interest in the company and jump-started its financial outlook, resulting in substantial net profits for the next four years: $1,061,648 in 1951, $589,259 in 1952, $411,113 in 1953, and $414,480 in 1954.

== Monogram enters the field of TV ==
Monogram was the first substantial theatrical distributor to offer its recent films to network television, in April 1948. Steve Broidy's asking price was $1,000,000 for a package of 200 features, or $5,000 per title. The CBS network declined the offer. Three years later, in August 1951, Broidy turned away from expensive network television and looked toward the promising field of programming for local stations. Broidy offered 199 features to Eliot Hyman of Motion Pictures for Television, a pioneer TV syndicator recently established by film executive Matty Fox. Hyman bought the package for the more attractive price of $1,250 per title.

Monogram cautiously entered the field of syndicating its own product in November 1951. Major studios avoided putting their names on their television subsidiaries, fearing adverse reaction and charges of unfair competition from their movie-theater customers. Monogram followed suit, christening its TV arm as Interstate Television Corporation. Ralph Branton, a former exhibitor who became a Monogram executive, was named president. Interstate's biggest success was The Little Rascals series (formerly Hal Roach's Our Gang theatrical comedy shorts, which had been reissued for theaters by Monogram). Interstate further pursued juvenile audiences by distributing Monogram's feature-length westerns with Wild Bill Elliott, and outdoor adventures with Kirby Grant and "Chinook, the Wonder Dog." Interstate used the stock title design it created for the Little Rascals shorts when it filmed new TV titles for the Elliott and Grant features.

In July 1961 Interstate TV became Allied Artists Television Corporation, under the leadership of Edward Morey, who had been a production manager for the studio. Variety commented on the updated company's getting quick results: "Allied Artists Television Corp. took over a fading Interstate TV company and injected some new razzmatazz patterns into syndication, with a resultant setup that now gives AAT the status of a major distribery with techniques that are paying off in handsome dividends. Most of it was accomplished through the marketing of five going packages of feature films, with particular success in bundling the pix as a series" [48 Bowery Boys, 22 science-fiction, 13 Bomba, and two packages comprising 72 miscellaneous features].

Allied Artists' television library was sold to Lorimar's TV production and distribution arms in 1979. Lorimar was acquired by Warner Bros. Television, which now controls the library.

== The end of Monogram ==
Walter Mirisch's prediction about the end of the low-budget film had come true thanks to television. In September 1952 Monogram announced that henceforth it would only produce films bearing the Allied Artists name. The Monogram brand name was retired in 1953, and the company was now known as Allied Artists Pictures Corporation.

Allied Artists retained a few vestiges of its Monogram identity, continuing its popular Stanley Clements action series (through 1953), its B-westerns (through 1954), its Bomba, the Jungle Boy adventures (through 1955), and especially its breadwinning comedy series with The Bowery Boys (through 1957, with Clements replacing Leo Gorcey in 1956). For the most part, Allied Artists was heading in new, ambitious directions under Mirisch.

== Allied Artists' major productions ==
The studio began to allocate more funds to $200,000–300,000 action films and increase its Cinecolor movies to 12 "special" films a year. The studio, always known for its attention to economies, often kept sets standing from major productions and reused them for minor productions. The Bowery Boys comedies in particular benefited from this recycling policy: backgrounds from Roar of the Crowd were seen again in Jalopy; sets commissioned for The Adventures of Hajji Baba were used in Bowery to Bagdad; the Riot in Cell Block 11 sets showed up in Jail Busters; and the Sabu and the Magic Ring sets were repurposed for Looking for Danger. Riot in Cell Block 11 (1954) was Allied's biggest hit to date, surpassing The Babe Ruth Story of 1948. Also popular was Jack Slade (1953).

For a time in the mid-1950s, the Mirisch family held great influence at Allied Artists, with Walter as executive producer, his brother Harold as head of sales, and brother Marvin as assistant treasurer.

The studio continued to sign prominent producers and directors who had left long-term jobs at other studios. Roy Del Ruth had joined Allied Artists in 1947, followed by Walter Wanger in 1951. In May 1954 Allied announced a three-picture deal with director John Huston, starting with The Man Who Would Be King. The project was delayed and then abandoned, but the studio held on to the property, which was finally produced in 1975.

In 1953 Variety reported that Allied Artists would be making more movies on location, from England to Alaska. In September 1954 Allied announced it would make one "A" picture a month, starting with The Human Jungle, Tonight's the Night, Danger Point, Target Earth, The Bob Mathias Story, The Big Combo, Shotgun, An Annapolis Story, and The Black Prince. Other bigger-budgeted movies included The First Texan, The Phenix City Story, and The Hunchback of Notre Dame.

In March 1955 Allied Artists had a $25 million production plan over 18 months. By July 1955 five of these films had been finished and AA had signed deals to make co-productions with Erna Films of Austria including Sissi as well as films in England. In October 1955 Steve Broidy announced that Allied Artists would become more like United Artists and said deals had been made with Humphrey Bogart and Lauren Bacall.

The Mirisch brothers pushed the studio into big-budget filmmaking, having signed contracts with John Huston, William Wyler, Billy Wilder, and Gary Cooper. Their first big-name productions were Wyler's Friendly Persuasion (1956)—nominated for six Academy Awards, including Best Picture—and Wilder's Love in the Afternoon (1957). Despite their prestige and popularity, Love in the Afternoon and Friendly Persuasion struggled to return their high costs. In August 1957 Walter Mirisch left Allied for United Artists. Allied recorded a loss for the year ended June 1957, amounting to $2,458,910, and a loss of $1,189,688 the following year.

== Post-Mirisch ==
Steve Broidy was determined to return the company to profitability: "We are going to make potentially good-grossing pictures. Anyone who thinks blockbusters alone will carry the industry is crazy.” Broidy was as good as his word, reverting to the topical "exploitation special" entertainments favored by Monogram in the mid-1940s. Roger Corman, who had sold his first script to Allied Artists (Highway Dragnet), made several films at Allied as a producer and director. The double bill of Not of This Earth (1957) and Attack of the Crab Monsters (1957) made almost $1 million. Corman went on to produce and direct Teenage Doll, War of the Satellites, and The Wasp Woman. He also had some money in films like Crime and Punishment U.S.A., The Cry Baby Killer, and Hot Car Girl. The latter film was one of a series of teenage exploitation features like Crime in the Streets, Dino, Hot Rod Rumble, Joy Ride, Speed Crazy, and The Rebel Set. Allied also had a huge success with the science-fiction film Attack of the 50 Foot Woman.

Allied's films of 1958 included Oregon Passage, Never Love a Stranger, Bullwhip, Man from God's Country, Macabre, Queen of the Universe, War of the Satellites, Dateline Tokyo, The Pagans, Invasion of the Gorgons, The Bride and the Beast, Teenage Mother, Hong Kong Incident and the final Bowery Boys feature, In the Money (filmed in September 1957 and released in January 1958). The studio announced that the Bowery Boys series would continue for another year, but decided to abandon new Bowery Boys productions for theaters, and instead syndicated the entire series to television.

In January 1959 Allied announced it would make 36 films, six of which would cost $1 million or more, starting with The Big Circus.

Allied made its studio space and facilities available to independent producers. Billy Wilder's Some Like It Hot, handled by United Artists and produced by Walter Mirisch, was filmed using many of Allied Artists' resident technicians. The studio had renewed success with the release of Al Capone (filmed on the still-standing Some Like It Hot sets) in 1959. This led to Allied making more crime-related subjects like Pay or Die (1960), dramatizing policeman Joseph Petrosino's pioneering crusade against organized crime; The Purple Gang (1960); The George Raft Story (1961); and Convicts 4 (1962). There were also war-related stories like Operation Eichmann (1961), capitalizing on the recent capture of Nazi war criminal Adolf Eichmann; and Hell to Eternity (1961), the story of war hero Guy Gabaldon. The studio still made occasional "exploitation specials" like The Beast of Budapest (1958), re-enacting the Hungarian Revolution of 1956, and I Passed for White (1960), an adaptation of the novel by Reba Lee.

There were cutbacks in overall production – the studio had released 35 films in 1958, but this dropped to 12 in 1960, mainly because the studio stopped making westerns.

The success of Al Capone helped turn the company around and it made a profit of $1,240,000 for the year ended July 1960 and $530,000 for the following year.

In the early 1960s Allied invested in a series of bigger-budgeted films once more, including El Cid (1961), and Billy Budd (1962). Releases in 1963 included Soldier in the Rain, Shock Corridor, Cry of Battle, The Gun Hawk, Horrors of the Black Zoo, Gunfight at Comanche Creek and War is Hell, plus the studio's big epic, 55 Days at Peking. Chairman of the board Ray Johnston, who had established the company in 1931, sold virtually all of his stock in Allied Artists, retaining only a single share. Allied recorded a loss of $1.5 million for the 1962 financial year, losing $2.7 million the following year.

In January 1964 Allied announced it had 11 films awaiting release including The Thin Red Line, Never Put It in Writing, The Naked Kiss, The Strangler and A Yank in Vietnam. Toward the end of the year the company was filming Young Dillinger, Taffy and the Jungle Hunter, White Savage, and Mara of the Wilderness. The studio's most successful film from this period was Tickle Me (1965), Elvis Presley's only picture for an independent studio.

That year the company recorded a loss of $1,490,116. Studio chief Steve Broidy left Allied Artists in 1965 to form his own company, Motion Pictures International.

== Post-Broidy ==
Broidy was succeeded by Emanuel L. Wolf, but Wolf's tenure was short: Allied Artists ceased production in 1966.

Allied Artists became a distributor of international films such as A Man and a Woman and Belle de Jour. It did have some funds in Doomsday Machine but the film was never released. The studio also had money in Last Summer, Paddy, and Marry Me, Marry Me.

The studio enjoyed the biggest successes in its history with the release of Cabaret in 1972 and Papillon in 1973. Both were critical and commercial successes, but high production and financing costs meant they were not big moneymakers for the company. Allied Artists raised financing for its adaptation of The Man Who Would Be King (1975) by selling the European distribution rights to Columbia Pictures, and the rest of the backing came from Canadian tax shelters. King was released in 1975, to disappointing returns. That same year, the company distributed the French import Story of O, but spent much of its earnings defending itself from obscenity charges.

In 1976, Allied Artists attempted to diversify when it merged with consumer producers Kalvex and PSP, Inc. The new Allied Artists Industries, Inc. manufactured pharmaceuticals, mobile homes, and activewear in addition to films.

=== Demise ===
Allied Artists stayed afloat, mostly as a television syndicator, until 1979 when runaway inflation and high production costs pushed it into bankruptcy.

=== Fate of the film library ===
The post-August 1946 Monogram/Allied Artists library was bought by television production company Lorimar in 1980 for $4.75 million; today a majority of this library belongs to Warner Bros. Pictures (via their acquisition of Lorimar in 1989). The pre-August 1946 Monogram library was sold in 1954 to Associated Artists Productions under The 199 Corp., which itself was sold to United Artists in 1958 (it merged with Metro-Goldwyn-Mayer in 1981). Due to this library being copyright renewed under United Artists Television, the pre-1946 Monogram library was not part of the deal with Ted Turner. (The rights to many of the later films are now owned by MGM via United Artists; others, such as The Big Combo, lapsed into the public domain.) A selection of post-1938 Monogram films acquired by M&A Alexander Productions and Astor Pictures were later incorporated into Melange Pictures' library, today a part of Skydance-owned Paramount Pictures. Most Monogram Pictures films released before 1942 are in the public domain.

== Tribute ==
Jean-Luc Godard dedicated his film Breathless (1960) to Monogram.

== Studios ==
=== Sunset Boulevard ===
Allied Artists had its studio at 4401 W. Sunset Boulevard in Hollywood, on a 4.5-acre lot. The longtime home (since 1971) of former PBS television station KCET, the station sold the studios to the Church of Scientology in April 2011.

=== Monogram Ranch ===
Monogram Pictures operated the Monogram Ranch, its movie ranch in Placerita Canyon near Newhall, California, in the northern San Gabriel Mountains foothills. Tom Mix had used the Placeritos Ranch for location shooting for his silent western films. Ernie Hickson became the owner in 1936 and reconstructed all the "frontier western town" sets, moved from the nearby Republic Pictures Movie Ranch (present day Disney Golden Oak Ranch), onto his 110-acre (0.45 km^{2}) ranch. A year later Monogram Pictures signed a long-term lease with Hickson for Placeritos Ranch, with terms that stipulated that the ranch be renamed Monogram Ranch. Actor/cowboy singer/producer Gene Autry purchased the Monogram Ranch property from the Hickson heirs in 1953, renaming it after his film Melody Ranch. As of 2010, it was operated as the Melody Ranch Motion Picture Studio and Melody Ranch Studios.

After fire damage, the sets were replaced; as of 2012, the studio had 74 buildings (including offices) and two sound stages. The owners in 2019 were Renaud and Andre Veluzat. The owners indicate that other recent movies were also partly filmed here, including Once Upon a Time in Hollywood. The site includes a movie memorabilia museum that is open to visitors.

== Filmography ==
- List of Monogram Pictures and Allied Artists Pictures films
