= British Agent =

1934 film by Michael Curtiz

- Poster of British Agent
- Directed by: Michael Curtiz
- Written by: Laird Doyle; Roland Pertwee
- Based on: Memoirs of a British Agent; 1932 memoir by R. H. Bruce Lockhart
- Produced by: Henry Blanke
- Starring: Leslie Howard; Kay Francis; William Gargan; Cesar Romero
- Cinematography: Ernest Haller
- Edited by: Thomas Richards
- Music by: Bernhard Kaun; Heinz Roemheld
- Production company: First National Pictures
- Distributed by: Warner Bros. Pictures
- Release date: September 15, 1934
- Running time: 81 minutes
- Country: United States
- Languages: English; Russian
- Budget: $475,000

British Agent is a 1934 American romantic espionage film directed by Michael Curtiz and starring Leslie Howard and Kay Francis. It is based on Memoirs of a British Agent, the 1932 autobiography of R. H. Bruce Lockhart, who worked for the British Secret Service during the Russian Revolution and had an affair with a Russian agent, later known as Moura Budberg. The film was produced by First National, then a division of Warner Bros. Pictures.

== Plot ==
In the days leading up to the Russian Revolution, Stephen Locke, a minor British diplomat, watches rioting in the streets. The revolutionary Elena Moura shoots it out with a Cossack soldier. When she retreats onto the grounds of the consulate, the soldier follows, forcing Stephen to intervene to protect British extraterritoriality. After the Cossack leaves, Elena emerges; she and Steven are attracted to each other, but their politics clash. Elena departs.

After the Russian Empire is overthrown and the Soviet Union is born, most Western diplomats evacuate. Stephen is left behind with just a servant, "Poohbah" Evans. Day after day, he waits with mounting frustration for instructions, passing the time with others in the same situation, the American Bob Medill, Gaston LeFarge, and Tito Del Val.

His boredom is lifted when he meets Elena again. She is now an important member of the government, working for Commissioner of War Leon Trotsky. He romances her, and they quickly fall in love.

However, her first loyalty is to her country. She demonstrates that when Stephen finally receives orders from the United Kingdom. He is to try to prevent Soviet Russia from concluding a separate peace with Imperial Germany, which would free up large numbers of German soldiers for the Western Front, but he is warned that he is only an "unofficial" British representative. Stephen carelessly reads the message in Elena's hearing. She passes along the information to her boss. As a result, when Stephen pleads with the Soviet government in Moscow to keep fighting, his arguments are undercut by their awareness of his status. He manages to get a delay of three weeks to see if he can persuade his superiors to agree to Soviet demands: £50 million, five army divisions and munitions. Instead, without Stephen's knowledge, the British send a force to Archangel to fight alongside the internal enemies of the Soviets.

After the Tsar is executed, Medill, LeFarge and Del Val persuade Stephen to join them in supporting counterrevolutionary forces. When Vladimir Lenin is seriously wounded in an assassination attempt, the Soviets initiate a harsh crackdown. LeFarge and Del Val are killed while they attempt to contact a rebel military leader in the city. Medill tries to do the same, but is caught and tortured for Stephen's whereabouts. When he refuses to crack, he is sentenced to die by firing squad the next day.

Elena is ordered to persuade him to tell her where Stephen is; knowing that she is in love with Stephen, Medill gives her the address. She reluctantly gives the information to Trotsky, who orders soldiers to level the building. Elena sneaks into the building, as she is determined to die with Stephen. They are reprieved, however. Just as the soldiers start shooting, news arrives that Lenin will recover and that he has ordered the release of all political prisoners. Later, Stephen and Elena depart for Britain. At the train station, Medill requests they send him a supply of bubble gum.

== Cast ==
- Leslie Howard as Stephen Locke
- Kay Francis as Elena
- William Gargan as Medill
- Phillip Reed as LeFarge
- Irving Pichel as Pavlov
- Ivan Simpson as Evans
- Halliwell Hobbes as Sir Walter Carrister
- J. Carroll Naish as Commissioner for War
- Walter Byron as Stanley
- Cesar Romero as Del Val
- Arthur Aylesworth as Henry Farmer
- Alphonse Ethier as Paul DeVigney
- Frank Reicher as Mr. X
- Tenen Holtz as Lenin
- Doris Lloyd as Lady Carrister
- Mary Forbes as Lady Trehearne
- Marina Schubert as Maria Nikolaievna
- George Pearce as Lloyd George
- Gregory Gaye as Kolinoff
- Paul Porcasi as Count Romano
- Olaf Hytten as Under Secretary (uncredited)

== Production ==
At one point, the studio considered the possibility of shooting some scenes on location in the Soviet Union, but the political situation there made that impossible. Instead, the film was shot at the studio in Hollywood, with sets designed by the art director Anton Grot. The comparatively-large budget of $475,000 allowed 41 different sets to be used to recreate Imperial Russia and the early years of the Revolution.

The same book was partly used as an inspiration for the television series Reilly, Ace of Spies, which also portrayed the adventures of Lockhart and Sidney Reilly during their years in Moscow around the time of the Russian Revolution.
