= Hugh Sinclair (actor) =

British actor (1903–1962)

- Born: 19 May 1903; London, England, UK
- Died: 29 December 1962 (aged 59); Slapton, Devon, England
- Spouse: Valerie Taylor (actress) 1930–1946 Rosalie Williams (artist) 1949–1962
- Children: 3

Hugh Sinclair (19 May 1903 – 29 December 1962) was a British actor. He trained for the stage at the Royal Academy of Dramatic Art in London and had a career spanning forty years in theatre, film and television. He worked in Britain and America with some of the 20th Century's most highly regarded actors and directors, including Ray Milland, Elisabeth Bergner, George Cukor and Carol Reed. His principal work was made in the theatre and he headed the cast of two landmark plays in London, Noël Coward's Private Lives in 1945 and the original London production of TS Eliot's The Cocktail Party in 1950. However notable films include Escape Me Never, A Girl Must Live, The Rocking Horse Winner and Circle of Danger. He excelled in light comedy and was known for his comic timing, often playing handsome, debonair characters.

== Early life ==
Hugh Sinclair was born in London on 19 May 1903, to the Rev Robert Sinclair and his wife Francesca née Sheldon. He was educated at Charterhouse School before studying for the stage at the Royal Academy of Dramatic Art. He played the piano from the age of seven and became an accomplished musician, enabling him to take on the roles of composers and musicians in his career. He credits his decision to become an actor to seeing Charlie Chaplin’s early films as a child.

== Career ==
=== Theatre ===
Hugh Sinclair made his stage debut in 1922 at The Theatre Royal, Portsmouth, playing Freddy Eynsford-Hill in Pygmalion with the Macdona Players and remained with the company for nearly two years, playing all the Shaw plays. He made his first appearance in London at Wyndham’s Theatre in December 1923 in The Rose and The Ring. He appeared in Charlot’s Revue with Gertrude Lawrence, Jack Buchanan and Beatrice Lillie at The Prince of Wales Theatre, London in 1924 and made his first appearance in America with the same company at the Selwyn Theatre, New York the following year.

He worked in New York, Boston and Chicago for eight years, returning to Britain in 1933 to play the composer Sebastian Sanger opposite Elizabeth Bergner in Escape Me Never. The play opened at The Opera House, Manchester in November of that year before transferring to The Apollo Theatre, London and then to the Shubert Theatre, New York. Peter Bull, writing in his autobiography I Know The Face, But..., recalls “The first night in London was one of those legendary affairs that really happened. We opened at the Apollo Theatre on December 8th 1933, and it was very difficult to get the audience to leave the theatre. I remember Elizabeth Bergner in the coffee scene saying under her breath “They don’t like it, they don’t like it” but within minutes it was patent that she had made one of the biggest successes in theatrical history”. On its opening night in London the play received forty two curtain calls, setting a record at the time, and it played to packed houses on both sides of the Atlantic.

Hugh Sinclair considered Elizabeth Bergner to be the best actress he ever worked with. “She had a phenomenal sense of humour. She was very vulnerable. She would go inside herself when she was working, into the emotion of the character. She was a star, a natural born star. I loved her vulnerability”.

He remained in New York for the following three years, working with Tallulah Bankhead and Walter Pidgeon at the Morosco Theatre in Something Gay in 1935.

He returned to Britain in 1938 to appear as Mrs. Priskin's Other Guest in Goodness, How Sad! at the Vaudeville Theatre, London, written by Robert Morley and directed by Tyrone Guthrie. The play's title was considered misleading by critics because it suggested a frivolous story but the play itself received consistently good reviews. Writing in The Daily Telegraph, 19 October 1938, W. A. Darlington described it as having “an unpretentious charm which may very easily give it a long run…Robert Morley has the sure touch of an actor-dramatist, and as he is here writing of a subject he knows thoroughly, his play achieves both humour and sincerity with equal ease…In this he owes a good deal to the playing of Jill Furse, a youthful actress who has a power of emotional intensity and integrity very impressive in anybody so young. In consequence this part may have been written for her. Hugh Sinclair makes an admirable foil for her, suggesting the meretriciousness of the film star’s charm without ever stressing it unduly”.

Hugh Sinclair was cast as David Naughton in Claudia, with Pamela Brown in the title role, at The St. Martin's Theatre, London, playing nearly five hundred performances between September 1942 and January 1944, making it his longest run in the West End. Theatre World, in its November 1942 edition, reported “Big hit of the season is Rose Franklin’s play Claudia which has already achieved a phenomenal run in America. The London production, presented by Lee Ephraim and Emile Littler, has introduced to West End audiences the young actress in Pamela Brown”.

He played Elyot Chase in Noël Coward’s Private Lives at The Apollo Theatre, London from 1945 to 1946 with Googie Withers playing the part of Amanda. She recalled “Noel loved our playing and was most flattering to both of us. Hugh was superb in these kind of roles and had the added advantage of being able to play the piano, so the scene in the second act was lovely to play with him as he used to accompany me when I sang Someday I’ll Find You. Then, while some of the dialogue went on, he continued to play, all of which added to the charm of the scene”.

He followed his success in Private Lives with the role of Gary Essendine in the first revival of Present Laughter at The Haymarket Theatre, London in 1947. Noël Coward directed and starred in this production which ran for a total of 528 performances, handing the lead role to Hugh Sinclair in July 1947. Sinclair was adept at rapid exchanges of dialogue between actors, where split second timing and clarity of diction are essential to the play's rhythm and pace. His role in Present Laughter demanded this level of precision acting and made him a natural choice for the part. The play is now recognised as one of Coward's great comedies.

He appeared as CK Dexter Haven in The Philadelphia Story in 1949 at the Duchess Theatre, London with Margaret Leighton playing the role of Tracy Lord.

He succeeded Rex Harrison as the unidentified guest in the original London production of The Cocktail Party at The New Theatre in 1950. It was the most popular of TS Eliot’s seven plays during his lifetime and focuses on a troubled married couple who, through the intervention of a mysterious stranger, settle their problems and move on with their lives. The play starts out as a satire on the drawing room comedies of the 1940s but, as it progresses, becomes a darker, philosophical and psychological treatment of human relations.

He appeared with David Tomlinson in The Little Hut at The Lyric Theatre, London in 1951, directed by Peter Brook and with sets by Oliver Messel.

He was Roy Plomley’s guest on Desert Island Discs on September 4th 1953 and in 1954 he introduced Marlene Dietrich at The Café de Paris in London. Seven of Britain’s leading actors were chosen for this role, including Paul Scofield, Alec Guinness and Robert Morley, and Dietrich’s performance was recorded for an album Marlene Dietrich Live At The Café de Paris with an introduction by Noel Coward.

His final appearance on the West End stage was in Guilty Party with Donald Sinden at The St Martin’s Theatre in 1961, written by Campbell Singer and George Rossand and produced by Peter Bridge. The play ran for a year in London before touring the UK.

=== Film ===
Hugh Sinclair made his film debut in Hollywood in 1933 in Our Betters, based on the play by W. Somerset Maugham, directed by George Cukor and starring Constance Bennett. Mordaunt Hall, film critic for The New York Times in 1933, called the film "a highly praiseworthy pictorial interpretation of the stage work”.

His first British film, Escape Me Never, was an adaptation of the stage play, made in 1935 and directed by Paul Czinner, in which Sinclair reprised his role as Sebastian Sanger. Elizabeth Bergner was nominated for an Oscar for Best Actress for her performance, but lost to Bette Davis. The film was shot on location in Venice and the Dolomites and was the 19th most popular film at the British box office in 1935/36. It was edited by David Lean with music by William Walton.

In 1936 he starred opposite Constance Cummings in the Gainsborough Pictures comedy Strangers on Honeymoon, directed by Albert de Courville and based on the 1926 novel The Northing Tramp by Edgar Wallace.

In 1939 he was cast as the Earl of Pangborough in A Girl Must Live, a British romantic comedy film directed by Carol Reed and starring Margaret Lockwood, Renee Houston and Lilli Palmer. This was one of a series of films Carol Reed made with Margaret Lockwood featuring comic dialogue with double entendres, considered unsuitable for an American audience at the time.

This was followed by The Four Just Men, made the same year and directed by Walter Forde, in which Hugh Sinclair starred with Griffith Jones, Edward Chapman and Frank Lawton. It was the first film to give him top billing and demonstrates his range as an actor. He takes on various roles throughout the story and his performance concludes with an address to the House of Commons in which his disguise as a Foreign Office minister is so convincing that only his distinctive vocal delivery suggests his true identity. His performance was noted at the time of the film's release for the way he transitioned seamlessly between characters, adopting accents and mannerisms to portray different social classes. Writing in The Guardian on the film's release to DVD in 2013, Philip French described the film as “an enjoyable thriller in which a quartet of suave patriotic vigilantes plan the death of a treacherous MP to save the empire on the eve of the second world war”. It was based on the 1905 novel by Edgar Wallace, produced by Ealing Studios and then re released in 1944 with an updated ending featuring newsreel of Winston Churchill and the Allied war effort as a fulfilment of the ideals of the Four.

He made five films during World War II, including The Saint’s Vacation and The Saint Meets the Tiger, in which he played the title role. Both films were made in 1941, the release of The Saint Meets the Tiger being delayed until 1943. These were the final two films in RKO’s series about the character created by Leslie Charteris. Unlike others in the series, Charteris co-wrote the screenplays himself and both films were produced and filmed in Britain where the previous Saint films had been made in Hollywood. He also made Alibi in 1942 with Margaret Lockwood and James Mason, Tomorrow We Live, with John Clements and Greta Gynt in 1943, and Flight From Folly, a musical comedy with Pat Kirkwood, released in May 1945. This was the last film to be made at Teddington Studios before it was bombed in 1944 and is currently missing from the BFI National Archive. It is listed as one of the British Film Institute's 75 Most Wanted lost films.

In 1945 he appeared in They Were Sisters, a Gainsborough Pictures film starring Phyllis Calvert and James Mason. The film was noted for its frank, unsparing depiction of marital abuse at a time when the subject was rarely discussed openly and became one of the biggest box office hits of the year. The Times wrote “the merit of this long and intelligent film lies in the skill with which it establishes the personalities of the sisters...the acting throughout has strength and sincerity”.

In 1949 he was cast as the father in The Rocking Horse Winner, written and directed by Anthony Pelissier and starring Valerie Hobson, John Howard Davies and John Mills. The film was overlooked at the time of its release, but is now regarded as a classic of British cinema, a dark, atmospheric and complex psychological drama, adapted from DH Lawrence’s story about a young boy who receives a rocking horse for Christmas and soon learns that he is able to pick the winning horse at the races.

Simon Heffer, writing in The Daily Telegraph in 2023, described it as “a truly great film. Not only does it comment on the nature of wealth and its relation to morality, as well as the class system in mid-20th century England; it also makes a point about illusion and reality. Pelissier’s script and the stunning performances are matched by Desmond Dickinson’s at times radical cinematography and a superb score by William Alwyn. It is a feast in every respect, and essential viewing”. Heffer characterised Hugh Sinclair as “one of the finest character actors of the 1940s”.

He appeared in the thriller Circle of Danger in 1951, directed by Jacques Tourneur and starring Ray Milland and Patricia Roc.

He continued to make films in the 1950s, including the courtroom drama Never Look Back with Rosamund John in 1952 and Man Trap with Paul Henreid and Kay Kendall in 1953, released in the US as Man in Hiding.

=== Television ===
Hugh Sinclair made the transition to television in the 1950s, a relatively new medium at the time, broadcast live, requiring performers to deliver their lines flawlessly and technical crews to work seamlessly to bring the shows to audiences in real-time. He appeared in The Royalty in 1957, a six part series with Margaret Lockwood, in an adaptation of Jane Austen's Pride and Prejudice in 1958 and the BBC comedy A Life of Bliss in 1960 - 1961 with George Cole and Moira Lister.

Vere Lorrimer, Director of Drama and Serials at BBC Television in 1958, recalled an incident during the broadcast of You are There, a series in which historical events were relived. “Hugh was playing Marshal Ney at the Congress of Vienna, wearing long lace cuffs, and reading a letter by candle light. As he read, one of the cuffs caught fire. It was ‘live’ in those days so you couldn't stop. The producer, Michael Mills, yelled at the camera man to get in close on Hugh and I crawled in, out of shot, on hands and knees and somehow doused the flames. All the time, Hugh kept on reading the letter without batting an eyelid and the scene was successfully finished. His arm was slightly burned but he never stopped.”

He made two feature films for television, The Face of Love in 1954, a modern day adaptation of Troilus and Cressida, produced and directed by Alvin Rakoff, and Mr. Bowling Buys a Newspaper in 1957, a psychological thriller written by Donald Henderson, directed by Stephen Harrison with Hugh Sinclair in the title role and Beryl Reid as Alice.

He made his final appearance on British television on December 11th 1962 in Alida, a drama made for the Associated Television series Play of the Week.

== Personal life ==
Hugh Sinclair married the actress Valerie Taylor in 1930. After the birth of their son, Hugh Duncan, in New York in May 1935, the couple appeared together at the John Golden Theatre, New York in Love of Women in 1937, in Dear Octopus as it toured the UK in 1940, and in Skylark at the Duchess Theatre, London, in 1942. They divorced in 1946. He married the artist Rosalie Williams in 1949 and they had two children, Nicholas (born 1954) and Christina (born 1955).

== Death ==
Hugh Sinclair died on December 29th, 1962 in Slapton, Devon, where he was on holiday with his family. His death was announced on BBC television and radio and his obituary appeared in both The Times and The New York Times. In his Times obituary he was described as having “a reputation for exceptional generosity among those with whom he worked, and on many occasions gave valuable help and support to younger members of a company”.

== Selected filmography ==
- Our Betters (1933)
- Escape Me Never (1935)
- Strangers on Honeymoon (1937)
- The Prisoner of Corbal (1939)
- The Four Just Men (1939)
- A Girl Must Live (1939)
- The Saint's Vacation (1941)
- The Alibi (1942)
- Tomorrow We Live (1943)
- The Saint Meets the Tiger (1943)
- They Were Sisters (1945)
- Flight from Folly (1945)
- Corridor of Mirrors (1948)
- Don't Ever Leave Me (1949)
- Trottie True (aka The Gay Lady) (1949)
- The Rocking Horse Winner (1950)
- No Trace (1950)
- Circle of Danger (1951)
- Judgment Deferred (1952)
- Mantrap (1953 film) (1953)
- Never Look Back (1952)
- The Second Mrs Tanqueray (1953)
- Three Steps in the Dark (1953)

The Saint Records
Preceded by George Sanders	Oldest Actor; 1941–1953	Succeeded by Louis Hayward
Preceded by George Sanders	Oldest Living Actor; 1941 – 29 December 1962	Succeeded by George Sanders
