= The Bride Came C.O.D. =

1941 film by William Keighley

- Theatrical release poster
- Directed by: William Keighley
- Screenplay by: Julius J. Epstein; Philip G. Epstein
- Story by: Kenneth Earl; M. M. Musselman
- Produced by: Hal B. Wallis (executive producer)
- Starring: James Cagney; Bette Davis; Stuart Erwin; Eugene Pallette
- Cinematography: Ernest Haller
- Edited by: Thomas Richards
- Music by: Max Steiner
- Production company: Warner Bros. Pictures
- Distributed by: Warner Bros. Pictures
- Release date: July 12, 1941
- Running time: 92 minutes
- Country: United States
- Language: English

The Bride Came C.O.D. is a 1941 American screwball romantic comedy starring James Cagney as an airplane pilot and Bette Davis as a runaway heiress, and directed by William Keighley. Although the film was publicized as the first screen pairing of Warner Bros.' two biggest stars, they had actually worked together in Jimmy the Gent in 1934, and had wanted to find another opportunity to work together.

The screenplay was written by twins Julius J. Epstein and Philip G. Epstein, from a story by Kenneth Earl and M. M. Musselman. The basic plot owes much to It Happened One Night, in which an heiress seeks to marry a playboy of whom her father disapproves, only to end up with a charming working man.

== Plot ==
A publicity-hungry broadcaster promotes the elopement between Joan Winfield, the daughter of Texas oil tycoon Lucius K. Winfield, and popular womanizing band leader Alan Brice after a whirlwind courtship of only four days. Steve Collins, who runs a small air charter service, is engaged to fly them from Los Angeles, California, to Las Vegas, Nevada. Steve's owes the finance company $1,112.77 ($24,900 in 2025) by midnight or they will seize his airplane. Upon hearing on the radio of the upcoming elopement, Winfield calls his daughter at the airport to attempt to prevent it, accusing Alan of being a fortune-hunter. Steve rings Winfield back, offering to sabotage the elopement and deliver his daughter to him, unmarried, in Amarillo, Texas. They agree on a freight charge of $10 a pound C.O.D for whatever she weighs, enough at Joan's estimated 115 pounds for Steve to pay off his debt. When the creditor returns to demand the key to his plane, Steve knocks him out cold. Tricking Alan out of the airplane by telling him that he has an urgent phone call from New York, Steve takes off with Joan. The press reports the bride as kidnapped, and the story blares across nationwide headlines.

Joan asks Steve how much he is asking for ransom, offering to pay more. He tells her he is charging $1100—more or less—and she offers to pay him $5,000 to return her. Steve insists he cannot go back on the bargain with her father. When an irate Joan tries to jump out of the aircraft, Steve sees that her parachute is on both backwards and unfastened. He swerves the plane wildly to keep her from jumping, then crash lands near the ghost town of Bonanza, 60 miles from the nearest town.

The Los Angeles assistant DA instructs Sheriff McGee to find the kidnapper and arrest him for stealing the plane from the finance company (kidnapping is out of their jurisdiction). At the crash site, Joan and Steve spend the night camping out; Steve produces a picnic basket full of fattening food and encourages Joan to eat.

The next morning, they encounter the ghost town's lone resident, "Pop" Tolliver. Joan insists she is being kidnapped, but Steve contends it's a lover's quarrel. When Tolliver hears news of the abduction on the radio, he marches Steve at gunpoint into the town jail. Tolliver and Joan set out in his old 1920s jalopy, which breaks down within sight of Bonanza. Joan and Tolliver hear on the news that a search team has been dispatched. When Tolliver learns that Joan's father hired Collins to stop the elopement, he lets Collins out of jail, determined to help return Joan to her father.

Aware the search team has spotted her and a rescue will be forthcoming, Joan escapes into an abandoned mine, followed by Steve, where they become trapped by a cave-in. When Joan falls asleep, Steve finds a way out and enjoys a meal with Pop. On Pop's advice, he returns to Joan in the mine without disclosing the exit. Believing they are going to die, Joan re-examines her frivolous life, second-guessing her hasty elopement with Alan. Steve tells her that he loves her, but when they kiss she tastes mustard on his lips, realizes he has deceived her, and is outraged. Exiting the mine they find that Alan has tracked them down, accompanied by a Nevada judge, and the California sheriff is there with a state arrest warrant. To prevent Steve's arrest, Tolliver lies and tells the sheriff that Bonanza is in Nevada, making his California search warrant "invalid".

Still angry, Joan agrees to marry Alan. Stalling for time until Joan's father arrives, Steve does not object when the Nevada judge marries them, since the marriage is invalid. The "newlyweds" get airborne, but when Joan sees a souvenir labeled “Bonanza, California,” she realizes they are not really married and parachutes out to be reunited with Steve. They get married with her father's approval and honeymoon in Bonanza. After celebrating, Joan weighs in at 118 pounds, for a C.O.D. payment of $1180, enough to pay off Steve's debt.

== Cast ==
- James Cagney as Steve Collins
- Bette Davis as Joan Winfield
- Stuart Erwin as Tommy Keenan
- Eugene Pallette as Lucius K. Winfield
- Jack Carson as Alan Brice
- George Tobias as Peewee Dafoe
- Harry Davenport as "Pop" Tolliver
- William Frawley as Sheriff McGee
- Edward Brophy as Hinkle
- Harry Holman as Judge Sobler
- Chick Chandler as 1st Reporter
- Douglas Kennedy as 2nd Reporter (credited as Keith Douglas)
- Herbert Anderson as 3rd Reporter
- William Newell as McGee's Pilot
- William Hopper as Keenan's Pilot (credited as DeWolf Hopper)

== Production ==
The Bellanca F Rocket used in the film as Cagney's "kidnapping" aircraft

Both Cagney and Davis were interested in changing their movie personas, with Cagney moving away from the gangster-themed roles, while Davis had been seen only in serious dramas, and a romantic comedy was the way. Cagney insisted on having his brother, William, produce the film, with his success shooting Captains of the Clouds (in progress, and released in 1942) proving that he could move from acting to producing. After their work on The Strawberry Blonde (1941), the Cagneys also brought in Julius and Philip Epstein to "invigorate" the script. Davis wasn't the first choice for the Joan Winfield part, as Ann Sheridan, Ginger Rogers and Rosalind Russell were considered before the coveted role was earmarked for Olivia de Havilland. With the backing of Hal Wallis, however, Davis got the part.

Principal photography took place in Death Valley, California, in January 1941. It proved problematic when temperatures soared, script problems went unresolved, and Davis needing to have 45 quills pulled out of her rear when she jumped out of the aircraft instead of a stunt double and accidentally fell into a cactus, which was left in the film.

Aircraft used in the production included contemporary Aeronca, Bellanca, Cessna, Lockheed, Ryan, and Waco models, mainly photographed at the Burbank Airport.

== Reception ==
The New York Times dismissed The Bride Came C.O.D. as "a serviceable romp." Reviewer Archer Winston in The New York Post succinctly put it: "Okay, Jimmie and Bette. You've had your fling. Now go back to work." Despite the critical reviews, the film was a popular favorite, and one of the year's top 20 box-office films.

For her part, in her later biographies and interviews, Bette Davis derided The Bride Came C.O.D., sarcastically saying, "it was called a comedy." She would also complain that "all she got out of the film was a derriere full of cactus quills."

Twenty-first century reviews have been unfavorable, with Gene Siskel and George Perry describing the film as neither "memorable nor funny" in 2009, but conceding that the two stars still are worth watching even in a forgettable formula feature. Film critic Dennis Schwartz declared in 2019, "At best it amounts to average fare."

== Radio adaptation ==
The Bride Came C.O.D. was presented on Lux Radio Theatre on CBS on December 29, 1941. The adaptation starred Bob Hope and Hedy Lamarr.
