= Jimmy the Gent =

Jimmy the Gent may refer to:

- Jimmy the Gent (film), a 1934 American comedy-crime film
- James Burke (gangster) (1931–1996), American gangster known as Jimmy the Gent
