= Michael Curtiz =

Hungarian and American director (1886–1962)

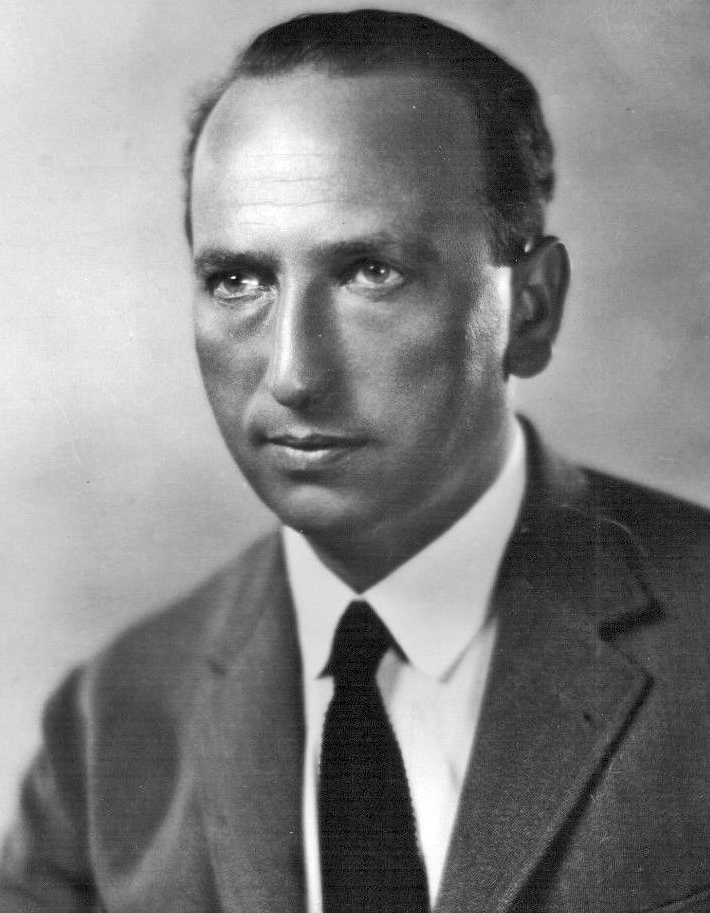
- Curtiz c. 1928
- Born: Manó Kaminer; December 25, 1886; Budapest, Austria-Hungary
- Died: April 10, 1962 (aged 75); Los Angeles, California, U.S.
- Other names: Mike Curtiz; Mihály Kertész
- Citizenship: Hungary (1886–1933); United States (after 1933)
- Occupation: Film director
- Years active: 1912–1961
- Spouses: Lucy Doraine (m. 1918; div. 1923) Bess Meredyth (m. 1929)
- Children: 2

Michael Curtiz (/kɜːrˈtiːz/; born Manó Kaminer; from 1905 Mihály Kertész; Hungarian: Kertész Mihály; December 25, 1886 – April 10, 1962) was a Hungarian and American film director, recognized as one of the most prolific directors in history. He directed classic films from the silent era and numerous others during Hollywood's Golden Age, when the studio system was prevalent.

Curtiz was already a well-known director in Europe when Warner Bros. invited him to Hollywood in 1926, when he was 39 years of age. He had already directed 64 films in Europe, and soon helped Warner Bros. become the fastest-growing movie studio. He directed 102 films during his Hollywood career, mostly at Warners, where he directed ten actors to Oscar nominations. James Cagney and Joan Crawford won their only Academy Awards under Curtiz's direction. He put Doris Day and John Garfield on screen for the first time, and he made stars of Errol Flynn, Olivia de Havilland, and Bette Davis. He himself was nominated five times, and won twice, once for Best Short Subject for Sons of Liberty and once as Best Director for Casablanca.

Curtiz was among those who introduced to Hollywood a visual style using artistic lighting, extensive and fluid camera movement, high crane shots, and unusual camera angles. He was versatile, and could handle any film genre: melodrama, comedy, love story, film noir, musical, war story, Western, horror, or historical epic. He always paid attention to the human-interest aspect of every story, stating that the "human and fundamental problems of real people" were the basis of all good drama.

The death of 25 horses in The Charge of the Light Brigade under Curtiz's direction resulted in a near-violent confrontation between Curtiz and star Errol Flynn, which led in turn to the U.S. Congress and the ASPCA enacting legislation and policy to prevent cruelty to animals on the sets of movies.

Curtiz helped popularize the classic swashbuckler, with films such as Captain Blood (1935) and The Adventures of Robin Hood (1938), both starring Flynn. He directed many other dramas which are considered classics: Angels with Dirty Faces (1938), The Sea Wolf (1941), Casablanca (1942), and Mildred Pierce (1945). He directed leading musicals, including Yankee Doodle Dandy (1942), This Is the Army (1943), and White Christmas (1954), and he made comedies, with Life with Father (1947) and We're No Angels (1955).

== Early life ==
Curtiz was born Manó Kaminer (Note: In Hungarian eastern name order Kaminer Manó) to a Hungarian-Jewish family in Budapest in 1886, where his father was a carpenter and his mother an opera singer. Several dates and years of birth had been used during his lifetime; in 2017, his biographer Alan K. Rode identified Curtiz's birth certificate, which specifies that he was born at 9 pm on December 25, 1886. In 1905, he Magyarised his name to Mihály Kertész. (Note: In Hungarian eastern name order Kertész Mihály) (Note: Other spellings that various biographers have used are Kertész Mihály, Michael Courtice, Michael Kertesz, Mihaly Kertesz, Michael Kertész, and Kertész Kaminer Manó) Curtiz had a lower middle class upbringing. He recalled during an interview that his family's home was a cramped apartment, where he had to share a small room with his two brothers and a sister. "Many times, we were hungry," he said.

After graduating from high school, he studied at Markoszy University, followed by the Royal Academy of Theater and Art, in Budapest, before beginning his career. (Note: According to biographer James C. Robertson, because Curtiz had given different accounts about his early life during his career, exact details about his early years have not been confirmed. For example, he said that he once ran away from home to perform in various acts with a circus.)

== Career in Europe ==
=== Actor ===
Curtiz became attracted to the theater when he was a child in Hungary. He built a little theatre in the cellar of his family home when he was 8 years old, where he and five of his friends re-enacted plays. They set up the stage, with scenery and props, and Curtiz directed them.

After he graduated from college at age 19, he took a job as an actor with a traveling theatre company, where he began working as one of their traveling players. From that job, he became a pantomimist with a circus for a while, but then returned to join another group of traveling players for a few more years. They played Ibsen and Shakespeare in various languages, depending on what country they were in. They performed throughout Europe, including France, Hungary, Italy, and Germany, and he eventually learned five languages. He had various responsibilities:

We had to do everything—make bill posters, print programmes, set scenery, mend wardrobe, sometimes even arrange chairs in the auditoriums. Sometimes we travelled in trains, sometimes in stage coaches, sometimes on horseback. Sometimes we played in town halls, sometimes in little restaurants with no scenery at all. Sometimes we gave shows out of doors. Those strolling actors were the kindest-hearted people I have ever known. They would do anything for each other.

=== Director ===
He worked as Mihály Kertész at the National Hungarian Theater in 1912. and was a member of the Hungarian fencing team at the Olympic Games in Stockholm. Kertész directed Hungary's first feature film, Today and Tomorrow (Ma és holnap, 1912), in which he also had a leading role. He followed that with another film, The Last Bohemian (Az utolsó bohém, also 1912).

Curtiz began living in various cities in Europe to work on silent films in 1913. He first went to study at Nordisk studio in Denmark, which led to work as an actor and assistant director to August Blom on Denmark's first multireel feature film, Atlantis (1913).

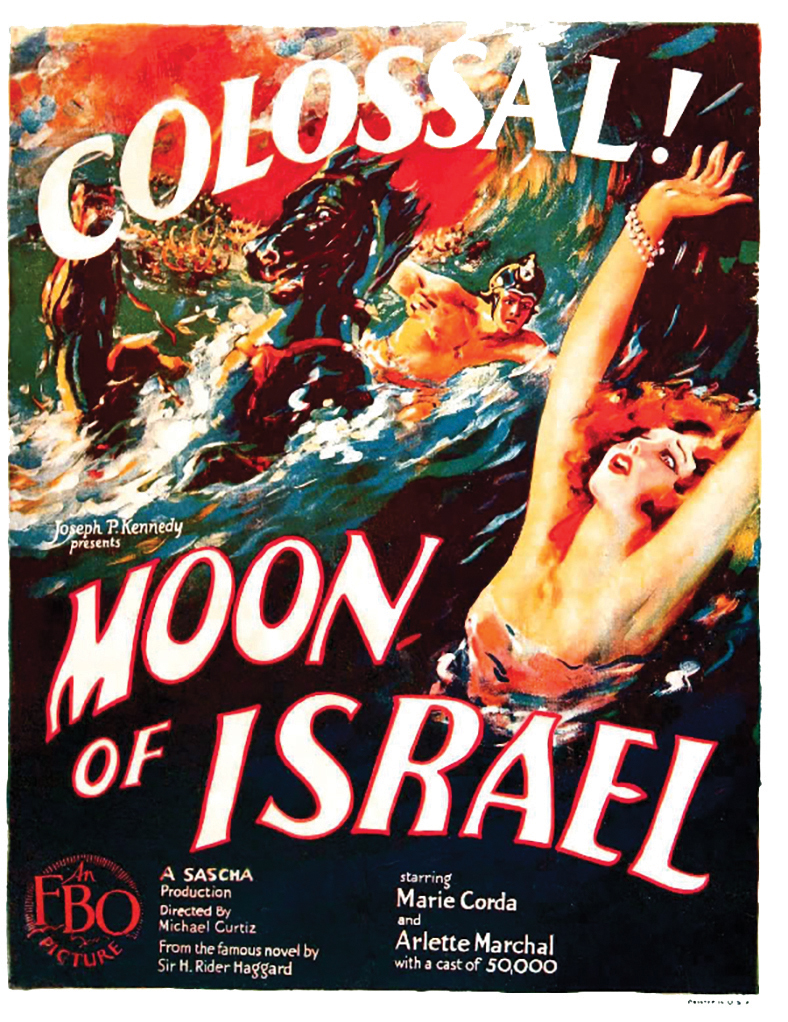
Movie poster, 1924

After World War I began in 1914, he returned to Hungary, where he served in the army for a year, before he was wounded fighting on the Russian front. Curtiz wrote of that period:

The intoxicating joy of life was interrupted, the world had gone mad ... We were taught to kill. I was drafted into the Emperor's Army ... After that, many things happened: destruction, thousands forever silenced, crippled or sent to anonymous graves. Then came the collapse [of Austria-Hungary]. Fate had spared me.

He was assigned to make fund-raising documentaries for the Red Cross in Hungary. In 1917, he was made director of production at Phoenix Films, the leading studio in Budapest, where he remained until he left Hungary. However, none of the films he directed there survive intact, and most are completely lost.

By 1918, he had become one of Hungary's most important directors, having by then directed about 45 films. After the Hungarian Soviet Republic was declared, he continued to work following the ideological guidelines of the new regime. Most notably he directed the short film Jön az öcsém ("My brother is coming home") which has been described as one of the earliest agitprop films. He was also appointed to the "Arts Council", set up to monitor proposed film scripts. At some point before the fall of the short-lived regime, probably in late May or early June 1919, he decided to emigrate to the West.

Curtiz briefly worked at UFA GmbH, a German film company, where he learned to direct large groups of costumed extras, along with using complicated plots, rapid pacing, and romantic themes. His career truly started due to his work for Count Alexander Kolowrat (known as Sascha), with whom he made at least 21 films for the count's film studio, Sascha Films. Curtiz later wrote that at Sascha, he "learned the basic laws of film art, which, in those days, had progressed further in Vienna than anywhere else."

Among the films he directed were Biblical epics such as Sodom und Gomorrha (1922) and Die Sklavenkönigin (1924) (titled Moon of Israel in the U.S.). He also made Red Heels (1925) and The Golden Butterfly (1926), and once directed 14-year-old Greta Garbo in Sweden. During this period, he tended to specialize in directing two kinds of films, either sophisticated light comedies or historical spectaculars. He launched the career of Lucy Doraine, who went on to become an international star, along with that of Lili Damita, who later married Errol Flynn.

I was laid in the aisles by Curtiz's camera work ... [by] shots and angles that were pure genius.

— Jack L. Warner, after watching Moon of Israel

The Moon of Israel (1924) was a spectacle of the enslavement of the children of Israel and their miraculous deliverance by way of the Red Sea. Shot in Vienna with a cast of 5,000, it had for its theme the love story of an Israelite maiden and an Egyptian prince. Paramount Pictures in the U.S. bought the rights to the film to compete with Cecil B. DeMille's The Ten Commandments. However, The Moon of Israel caught the attention of Jack and Harry Warner, and Harry went to Europe in 1926 just to meet Curtiz and watch him work as director. (Note: Some sources state that Jack L. Warner, Harry's younger brother, was who offered Curtiz a contract. In either case, Curtiz initially wanted to throw him off the set while he was working, since visitors made him nervous.)

The Warners were impressed that Curtiz had developed a unique visual style which was strongly influenced by German Expressionism, with high crane shots and unusual camera angles. The film also showed that Curtiz was fond of including romantic melodrama "against events of vast historical importance, for driving his characters to crises and forcing them to make moral decisions," according to Rosenzweig. He offered Curtiz a contract to be a director at his new film studio in Hollywood, Warner Bros., where he would direct a similar epic that had been planned, Noah's Ark (1928). By the time Curtiz accepted Warner's offer, he was already a prolific director, having made 64 films in countries including Hungary, Austria, and Denmark.

== Career in the United States ==
=== 1920s ===
Curtiz arrived in the United States in the summer of 1926, and began directing at Warner Bros. under the anglicised name Michael Curtiz. During what became a 28-year period at Warner Bros., he directed 86 films, including his best work.

Although he was an experienced filmmaker, now aged 38, Warners assigned him to direct a number of average-quality films to break him in, the first being The Third Degree (1926). Curtiz's unique camerawork technique was used throughout, visible in dramatic camera angles, in a style which one critic assumed other directors would likely envy.

When I first came here I was called on to direct six or seven pictures a year. I never turned down a single story. That was my schooling. I worked hard on every one of them. That is how you learn.

— Michael Curtiz

Learning English quickly was an immediate hurdle, however, since he had no free time. When Jack Warner gave him the film to direct, Curtiz recalls, "I could not speak one word of English." It was a romantic story about jail life and gangsters in Chicago, a place he had never been, about American underworld figures he had never met.

To gain some direct experience about the subject, Curtiz persuaded the Los Angeles sheriff to let him spend a week in jail. "When I came out, I knew what I needed for the picture."

Curtiz firmly believed that investigating the background of every story should be done first and done thoroughly before starting a film. He said that whenever someone asked him how he, a foreigner, could make American films, he told them, "human beings are the same all over the world. Human emotions are international." He treated his first films in the U.S. as learning experiences:

The only things that are different in different parts of the world are customs ... But those customs are easy to find out if you can read and investigate. Downtown there is a fine public library. There you can open a book and find out anything you want to know.

Curtiz never gave second-hand treatment to an assignment once it was accepted. He went ahead and graced plot and character with fluid camera movement, exquisite lighting, and a lightning-fast pace. Even if a script was truly poor and the leading players were real amateurs, Curtiz glossed over inadequacies so well that an audience often failed to recognize a shallow substance until it was hungry for another film a half-hour later.

— Author William Meyer

Although the language barrier made communicating with the casts and crews a hardship, he continued to invest time in preparation. Before he directed his first Western, for example, he spent three weeks reading about the histories of Texas and the lives of its important men. He found it necessary to continue such intensive studying of American culture and habits in preparation for most other film genres. But he was quite satisfied being in Hollywood:

It is splendid to work here in this country. One has everything at hand to work with. The director does not have to worry about anything except his ideas. He can concentrate on those with no worry about his production otherwise.

The Third Degree (1926), available at the Library of Congress, made good use of Curtiz's experience in using moving cameras to create expressionistic scenes, such as a sequence shot from the perspective of a bullet in motion. The film was the first of eight Curtiz films to have Dolores Costello as its star.

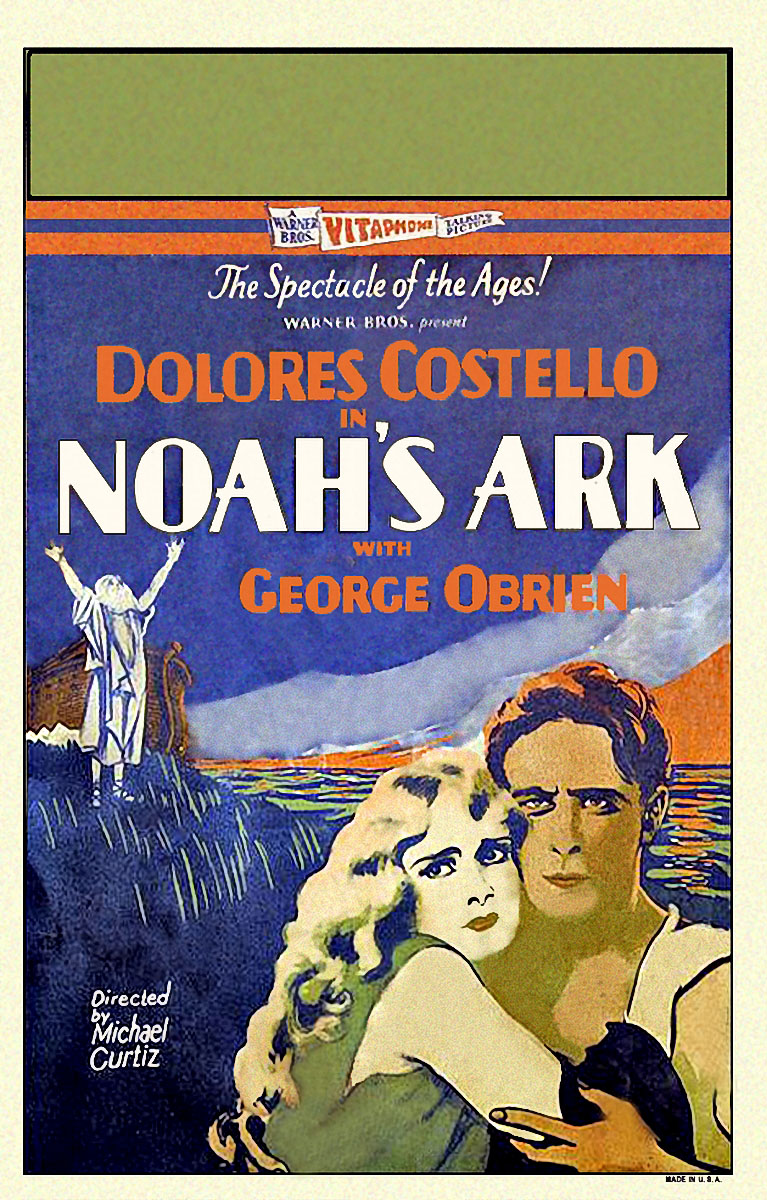
1928 Curtiz film

Warner Bros. had Curtiz direct three other mediocre stories to be sure he could take on larger projects, during which time he was able to familiarize himself with their methods and work with the technicians, including cameramen, whom he would use in subsequent productions. As biographer James C. Robertson explains, "In each case, Curtiz strove valiantly, but unsuccessfully to revitalize unconvincing scripts through spectacular camera work and strong central performances, the most noteworthy features of all those films."

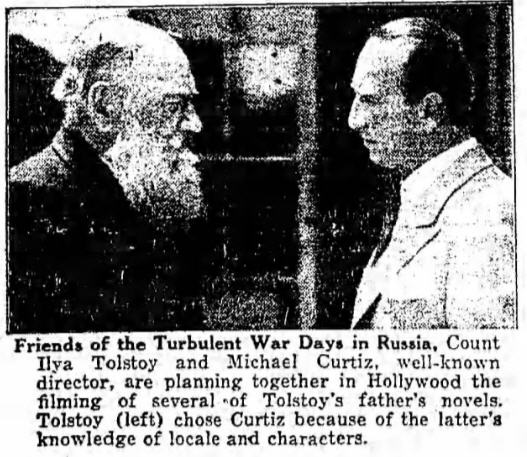
Curtiz (r) with Ilya Tolstoy in 1927

On a visit to Hollywood in 1927, Ilya Tolstoy, Leo Tolstoy's son, who had been a friend of Curtiz in Europe, wanted him to direct several films based on his father's novels. He chose Curtiz because he already knew the locale and its people. During this period, Warner Bros. began experimenting with talking films. They assigned two part-talking pictures for Curtiz to direct: Tenderloin (1928) and Noah's Ark (1928), both of which also starred Costello.

Noah's Ark included two parallel stories, one recounting the biblical flood, and the other a World War I-era romance. It was the first epic film attempted by Warner Bros., and in handing production over to Curtiz, they were hoping to assure its success. The climactic flood sequence was considered "spectacular" at the time, observed historian Richard Schickel, while biographer James C. Robertson said it was "one of the most spectacular incidents in film history." Its cast was made up of over 10,000 extras. However, the reissue of the film in 1957 cut an hour off the original time of 2 hours and 15 minutes. The story was an adaptation written by Bess Meredyth, who married Curtiz a few years later.

The critical success of these films by Curtiz contributed to Warner Bros' becoming the fastest-growing studio in Hollywood.

=== 1930s ===
In 1930, Curtiz directed Mammy (1930), Al Jolson's fourth film after being in Hollywood's first true talking picture, The Jazz Singer (1927). During the 1930s, Curtiz directed at least four films each year.

The most obvious aspect of Curtiz's directorial signature is his expressionistic visual style, and its most obvious feature is its unusual camera angles and carefully detailed, crowded, complex compositions, full of mirrors and reflections, smoke and fog, and physical objects, furniture, foliage, bars, and windows, that stand between the camera and the human characters and seem to surround and entrap them.

— Biographer Sidney Rosenzweig

Although unusual projects for Warner Bros., Curtiz directed two horror films for the studio, Doctor X (1932) and Mystery of the Wax Museum (1933), both in early Technicolor, with numerous atmospheric scenes filmed on the studio's back lot.

Another breakthrough film was 20,000 Years in Sing Sing (1932), starring then little-known actors Spencer Tracy and Bette Davis in one of their earliest films. MGM head Louis B. Mayer saw the film and was impressed enough by Tracy's acting that he hired him on to MGM's roster of stars.

Curtiz's American career did not really take off until 1935. In the early 1930s, Warner Bros. was struggling to compete with the larger MGM, which was releasing costume dramas such as Queen Christina (1933) with Greta Garbo, Treasure Island (1934) with Wallace Beery, and The Count of Monte Cristo (1934). Warner Bros. decided to take a chance and produce their own costume drama.

Until then, it was a genre in which Warners' had assumed they could never succeed, owing to its higher production budgets during the years of the Great Depression. However, in March 1935, Warners announced it would produce Captain Blood (1935), a swashbuckler action drama based on the novel by Rafael Sabatini, and directed by Curtiz. It would star a then unknown extra, Errol Flynn, alongside the little-known Olivia de Havilland.

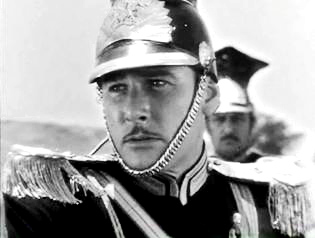
Errol Flynn in The Charge of the Light Brigade (1936)

The film was a major success with positive critical reviews. It was nominated for the Academy Award for Best Picture, and though not nominated, Curtiz received the second-highest number of votes for Best Director, solely from write-in votes. It also made stars of both Flynn and de Havilland, and it elevated Curtiz to being the studio's leading director.

Curtiz continued the successful genre of adventure films starring Flynn (often with de Havilland) that included The Charge of the Light Brigade (1936), a depiction of the British Light Brigade during the Crimean War. The film, another Oscar winner, was a greater success at the box-office than Captain Blood. It was followed by The Adventures of Robin Hood (1938, co-directed with William Keighley whom Curtiz replaced), the most profitable film that year, also winning three Academy Awards and being nominated for Best Picture. It is in Rotten Tomatoes' list of Top 100 Movies.

That being their third Curtiz film together, Flynn and de Havilland continued to star in other hugely successful films under his direction, including The Private Lives of Elizabeth and Essex (1939), also co-starring Bette Davis. Davis starred in a Curtiz film in most years during the 1930s.

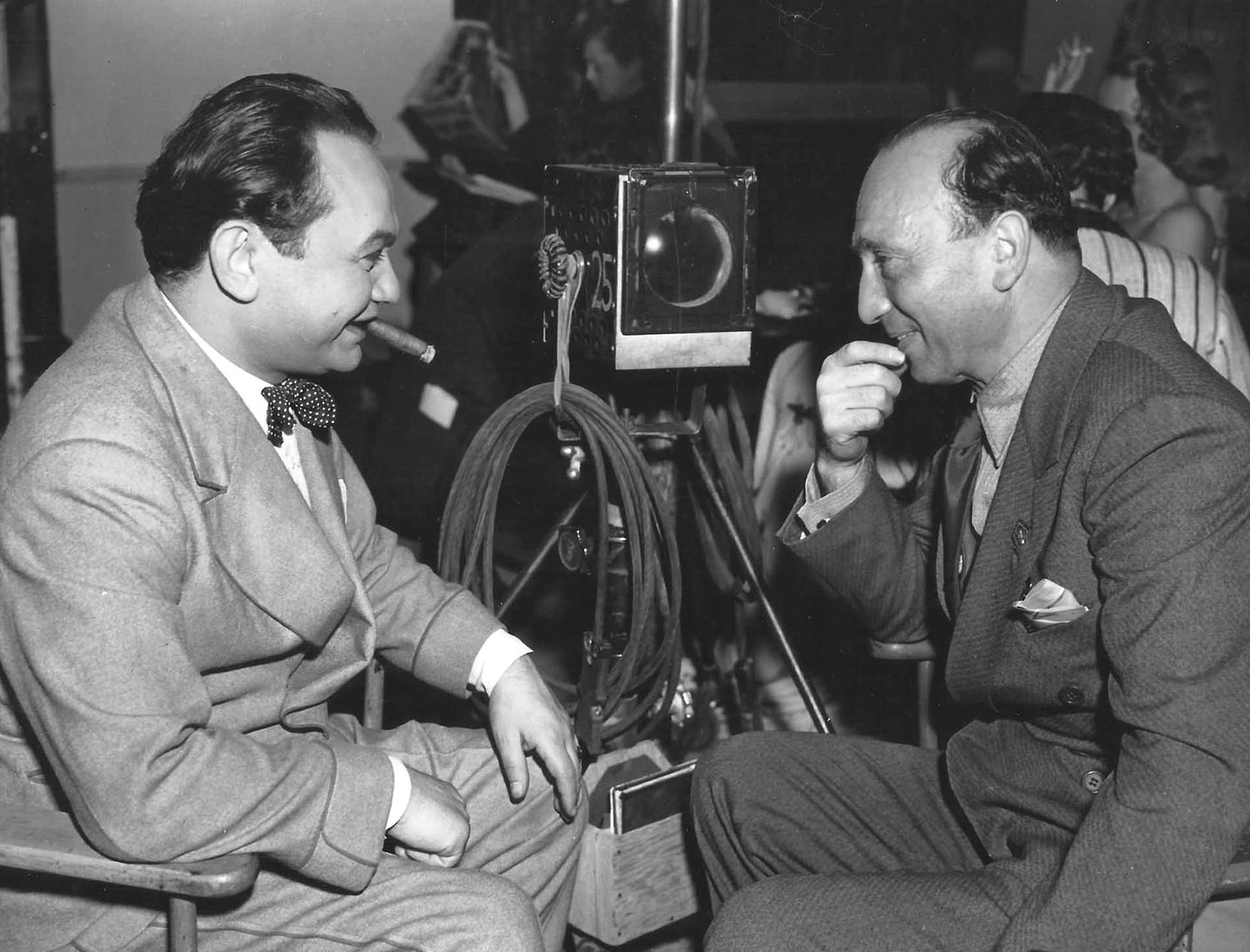
Edward G. Robinson (l) with Curtiz, during filming of Kid Galahad (1937)

Curtiz elicited some of the finest work from Edward G. Robinson in Kid Galahad (1937), where Robinson played a tough and sardonic, but ultimately soft-hearted, boxing manager. The picture co-starred Bette Davis and Humphrey Bogart.

Because of Curtiz's high film productivity, Warner Bros. created a special unit for his pictures, which then allowed him to manage two film crews. One worked with him during actual filming, while the other prepared everything for the next picture.

John Garfield was among Curtiz's discoveries. Curtiz discovered Garfield, a stage actor, by accident, when he came across a discarded screen test he gave, and thought he was very good. Garfield had assumed he failed the screen test and was already heading back to New York in disgust. Curtiz then went to Kansas City to intercept the train, where he pulled Garfield off and brought him back to Hollywood. Garfield made his debut in Four Daughters (1938), followed by a co-starring role in its sequel, Four Wives (1939). Garfield also later co-starred in Curtiz's The Sea Wolf (1941).

In Four Daughters, Garfield co-starred with Claude Rains, who would star in 10 Curtiz movies over his career, with six of those during the 1930s. Garfield and Rains "were brilliant together in this unjustly neglected Curtiz classic," says biographer Patrick J. McGrath. Garfield considered it his "obscure masterpiece." Reviews praised his role: "Perhaps the greatest single occurrence having to do with Four Daughters on reading the critics appears to be the debut of John Garfield, a brilliant young actor recruited from the Broadway stage." Similar approval came from The New York Times, which called Garfield's acting "bitterly brilliant ... one of the best pictures of anybody's career." Garfield and Rains co-starred the following year in Curtiz' Daughters Courageous (1939).

When James Cagney starred in Curtiz's Angels with Dirty Faces (1938), he was nominated for an Oscar for the first time. The New York Film Critics Circle voted him as best actor for his portrayal in the film, where he played the part of a hoodlum who redeems himself. Curtiz was also again nominated, solidifying further his status as the studio's most important director. Curtiz was nominated for the 1938 Oscar for Best Director for both Angels with Dirty Faces and Four Daughters losing to Frank Capra for You Can't Take It with You. Curtiz, however, had split his votes between two films and had actually the greater number of aggregate Academy votes.

The following year, Curtiz directed a short subject, Sons of Liberty (1939), starring Claude Rains, in a biopic which dramatizes the Jewish contribution to America's independence. Curtiz won an Academy Award in the category of Best Short Subject (Two-reel), for this film.

Three Westerns directed by Curtiz also starring Flynn were Dodge City (1939), Santa Fe Trail (1940) co-starring future US president Ronald Reagan, and Virginia City (1940).

=== 1940s ===
During the 1940s Curtiz continued to release more critically acclaimed films, including The Sea Hawk (1940), Dive Bomber (1941), The Sea Wolf (1941), Casablanca (1942), Yankee Doodle Dandy (1942), This Is the Army (1943), Mildred Pierce (1945), and Life with Father (1947).

One of the biggest hits of 1940 was The Sea Hawk, starring Errol Flynn in the role of an adventurer in the mold of Sir Francis Drake. Flora Robson played Queen Elizabeth I, and Claude Rains acted as the Spanish ambassador, whose job it was to mislead the Queen, who rightly suspected the Spanish Armada was about to attempt to invade England. Some critics felt the story was equivalent to actual events then taking place in Europe, describing it as a "thinly veiled diatribe against American isolationism on World War II's brink." Film columnist Boyd Martin noticed the similarities:

The parallel of the dreams of empire indulged in by King Philip of Spain and those apparently momentarily enjoyed by Hitler is so obvious that it will not escape detection even by the youngest film follower who reads his newspaper and goes to see the film ... In having been supplied with a parallel, Mr. Curtiz rides his Sea Hawk neck and neck with contemporary history.

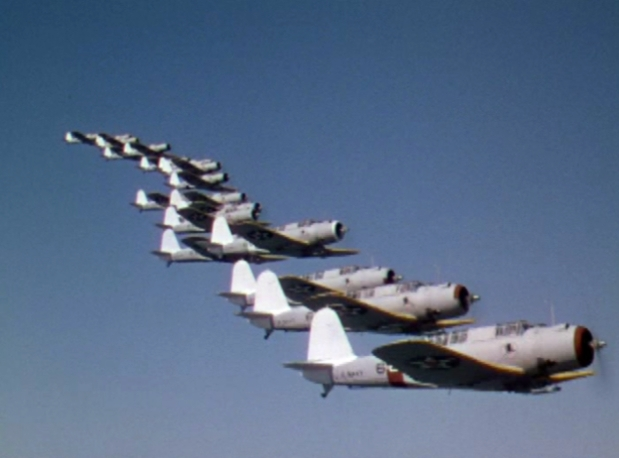
Scene from Dive Bomber (1941)

Dive Bomber (1941) was released a few months before the attack on Pearl Harbor.

Curtiz shot every foot of Dive Bomber with Navy assistance and under strict Navy scrutiny. Filming at the active naval base in San Diego required great care, especially for aerial sequences. To create realistic shots, he mounted cameras on the Navy's planes to achieve "amazing point-of-view shots," taking viewers inside the cockpit during flight. He also mounted cameras underneath the wings of planes to dramatize take-offs from the Enterprise, an aircraft carrier launched a few years earlier.

Bosley Crowther of The New York Times gave it a good review:

The Warners have photographed this picture in some of the most magnificent technicolor yet seen ... masses of brilliantly colored planes, ranked in impressive rows about an air base or upon the huge flight decks of carriers, and roaring in silver majesty, wing to wing, through the limitless West Coast skies. Never before has an aviation film been so vivid in its images, conveyed such a sense of tangible solidity when it is showing us solid things or been so full of sunlight and clean air when the cameras are aloft. Except for a few badly matched shots, the job is well nigh perfect.

The film was well received by the public, becoming the sixth-most popular film that year. No other pre-Pearl Harbor picture matched the quality of its flying scenes. Film columnist Louella Parsons wrote, "Dive Bomber again makes us glad we are Americans protected by a Navy as competent as ours."

Edward G. Robinson starred in The Sea Wolf (1941), his second film directed by Curtiz. He portrayed the rampaging, dictatorial captain of a ship in an adaptation of one of Jack London's best known novels. Robinson said the character he portrayed "was a Nazi in everything but name," which, Robinson observed, was relevant to the state of the world at that time. John Garfield and Ida Lupino were cast as the young lovers who attempt to escape his tyranny. Some reviews described the film as one of Curtiz's "hidden gems ... one of Curtiz's most complex works." Robinson was impressed by Garfield's intense personality, which he felt may have contributed to Garfield's death at age 39:

John Garfield was one of the best young actors I ever encountered, but his passions about the world were so intense that I feared any day he would have a heart attack. It was not long before he did.

With Michael Curtiz' magnificent 1941 version of The Sea Wolf ... full justice was for once done to London's text ... with the aid of models, newly introduced fog machines, and a studio tank, the film hauntingly captured an eerie malevolent atmosphere, brooding and full of terror ... From its economic opening scenes ... to its powerful climax ... it gripped consistently. Throughout, Curtiz provided object lessons in the use of sound—the groaning timbers of the ship, creaking footsteps, the wind—and closeups.

— Charles Higham and Joel Greenburg,
Hollywood in the Forties

Curtiz directed another Air Force film, Captains of the Clouds (1942), about the Royal Canadian Air Force. It stars James Cagney and Brenda Marshall. According to Hal B. Wallis, its producer, it became Warner Bros.' most extensive and difficult production, and everything had to be relocated to Canada. Like Dive Bomber, the vivid aerial scenes filmed in Technicolor were another feature that garnered critical attention, and the film was nominated for Best Art Direction and Best Color Cinematography.

Shortly after Captains of the Clouds was completed, but released after his next picture, Casablanca, Curtiz directed the musical biopic, Yankee Doodle Dandy (1942), a film about singer, dancer, and composer George M. Cohan. It stars James Cagney in a role totally opposite from the one he had played four years earlier in Curtiz's Angels with Dirty Faces. Where the earlier film became a career high point for Cagney's portrayals of a gangster, a role he played in many earlier films, in this film, an overtly patriotic musical, Cagney demonstrates his considerable dancing and singing talents. It was Cagney's favorite career role.

Cagney's bravura performance earned him his only Academy Award as Best Actor. For Warner Bros., it became their biggest box-office success in the company's history up to that time, nominated for nine Academy Awards and winning four. The success of the film also became a high point in Curtiz's career, with his nomination as Best Director. The film has been added to annals of Hollywood as a cinematic classic, preserved in the United States National Film Registry at the Library of Congress as being "culturally, historically, or aesthetically significant".

Curtiz directed Casablanca (1942), a World War II-era romantic drama described by Roger Ebert in 1996 as one of the most popular films ever made. Its stars were Humphrey Bogart, playing an expatriate living in Morocco, and Ingrid Bergman as a woman who was trying to escape the Nazis. The supporting cast features Paul Henreid, Claude Rains, Conrad Veidt, Sydney Greenstreet, and Peter Lorre. The picture received eight Academy Award nominations and won three, including Best Picture and one for Curtiz as Best Director. Time magazine in 2012 described Casablanca as "the best movie ever made".

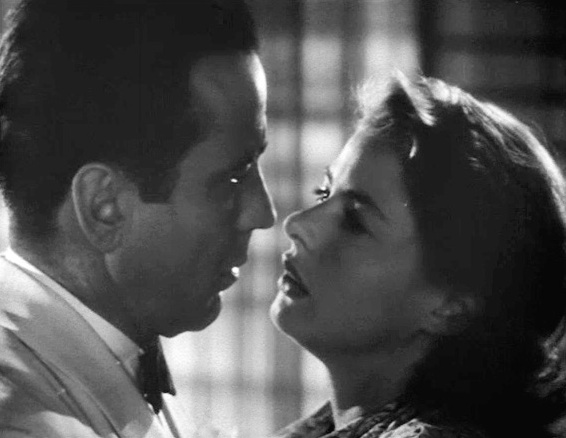
Humphrey Bogart and Ingrid Bergman in Casablanca (1942)

Another patriotic Curtiz film was This Is the Army (1943), a musical adapted from the stage play with a score by Irving Berlin. As America was engaged in World War II, the film boosted the morale of soldiers and the public. Kate Smith's rendition of "God Bless America" was one of the highlights of the film's nineteen songs. As a result of the film's numerous popular and generic elements, such as ground and aerial combat, recruitment, training, and marching as well as comedy, romance, song, and dance, it was the most financially successful war-themed film of any kind made during World War II.

This Is the Army is still the freshest, the most endearing, the most rousing musical tribute to the American fighting man that has come out of World War II ... buoyant, captivating, as American as hot dogs or the Bill of Rights ... a warmly reassuring document on the state of the nation. It is, from beginning to end, a great show.

— Bosley Crowther, New York Times

During this period, Curtiz also directed the World War II propaganda film Mission to Moscow (1943), a film which was commissioned at the request of President Franklin D. Roosevelt in support of the U.S. and British ally, the Soviet Union, at that time holding down 80% of all German forces as they repelled the Nazi invasion of Russia. The film was mostly well received by critics and was a success at the box office, but the film soon proved to be controversial after it stirred up strong anti-Communist attacks. Curtiz took the criticism personally and vowed never again to direct an overtly political film, a promise which he kept.

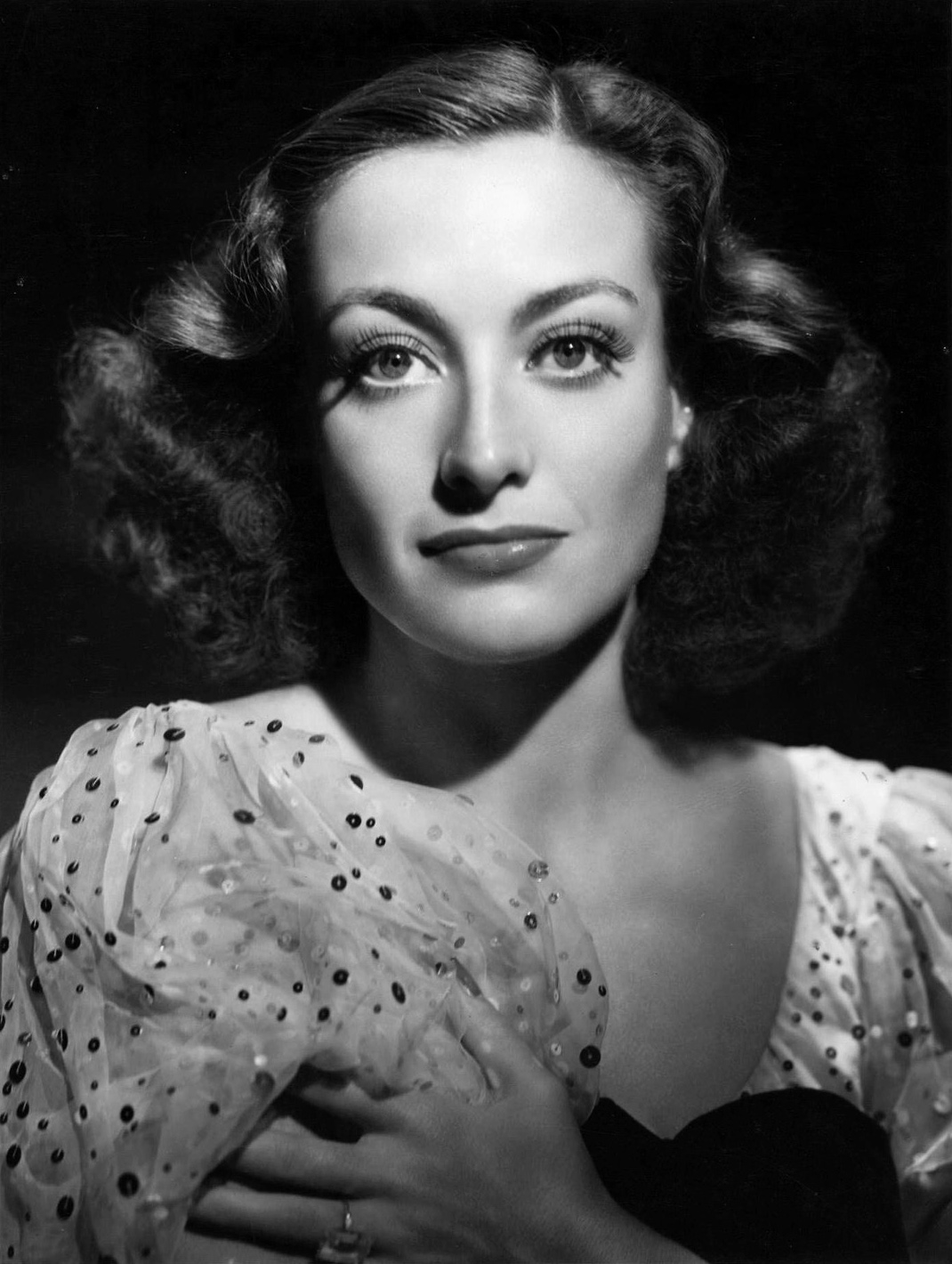
Joan Crawford stars in Mildred Pierce.

Mildred Pierce (1945) was based on the novel by James M. Cain. Its star, Joan Crawford, gave one of the strongest performances in her career, playing a mother and successful businesswoman who sacrifices everything for her spoiled daughter, played by Ann Blyth.

At the time Crawford accepted the part from Warner Bros., her 18-year career at MGM had been in decline. She had been one of Hollywood's most prominent and highest-paid stars but her films began losing money, and by the end of the 1930s, she was labeled "box office poison". Rather than remain at MGM and see newer, younger talent draw most of the studio's attention with better roles, she left MGM and signed a contract with Warner Bros. at a reduced salary.

Curtiz originally wanted Barbara Stanwyck for the role. However, Crawford, who by then had not been in a film for two years, did her best to get the part. Rare for a major star, she was even willing to audition for Curtiz. She was already aware that "Mr. Mike Curtiz hated me ... I don't want those big broad shoulders," he said. During her reading of an emotional scene as he watched, she saw him become so overwhelmed by her delivery that he cried, and he then said, "I love you, baby."

To help Crawford prepare for certain court scenes, Curtiz took her downtown, where they spent time visiting jails and watching criminal trials. In photographing her, he used careful film noir camera techniques, a style he learned in Europe, to bring out the features of Crawford's face, using rich black-and-white highlights. He was aware that Crawford guarded her screen image very carefully, and that she truly cared about quality. Crawford learned to appreciate Curtiz's genius with the camera. Eve Arden, who was nominated as Best Supporting Actress for the film, said "Curtiz was one of the few directors who knew what he wanted and was able to express himself exactly, even in his amusing Hungarian accent."

Mildred Pierce was nominated for six Academy Awards, including Best Picture. Only Crawford won, for Best Actress, her first and only Oscar. The novel's author, James M. Cain, gave her a leather-bound copy of Mildred Pierce, which he inscribed: "To Joan Crawford, who brought Mildred to life as I had always hoped she would be, and who has my lifelong gratitude." The film returned Crawford to the ranks of leading stars.

After the success of the film, Jack Warner gave Curtiz two new and exceptional contracts in appreciation, boosting his salary and reducing the number of films he had to direct each year to two.

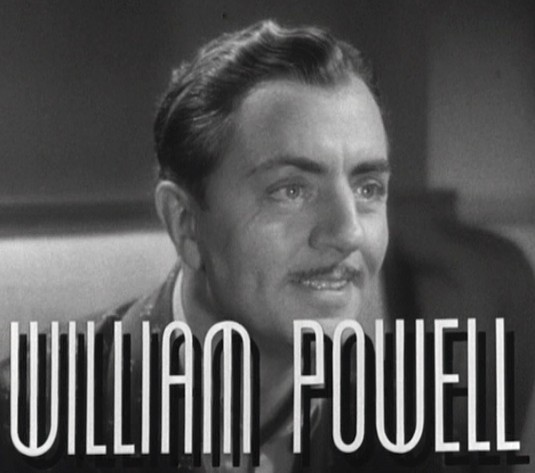
William Powell stars in Life with Father (1947).

Curtiz directed William Powell and Irene Dunne in Life with Father (1947), a family comedy. It was a big hit in the United States, and was nominated for four Academy Awards, including Best Actor for Powell. During Powell's career, he acted in 97 films; his third and last nomination was for this film. One review stated, "He is magnificent in the role, imbuing it with every attribute of pomp, dignity, unconscious conceit, and complete loveableness! His is one of the really great screen performances of the year ... that crowns a long screen life."

In the late 1940s, Curtiz made a new agreement with Warner Bros. under which the studio and his own production company were to share the costs and profits of his subsequent films with his films to be released through Warner Bros. "I'm going to try to build my own stock company and make stars of unknowns. It is getting impossible to sign up the big stars, because they are tied up for the next two years," he said. He also said that he was less concerned with looks than personality when using an actor. "If they are good-looking, that's something extra. But I look for personality."

He soon learned that good stories were even harder to come by: "Studios will pay anything for good stories ... they will buy it up before anyone else can get it," he complained. The story for Life With Father was said to have cost the studio $300,000, and the full budget for making the film was about $3 million. The subsequent films did poorly, however, whether as part of the changes in the film industry in this period or because Curtiz "had no skills in shaping the entirety of a picture". Either way, as Curtiz himself said, "You are only appreciated so far as you carry the dough into the box office. They throw you into gutter next day".

=== 1950s ===
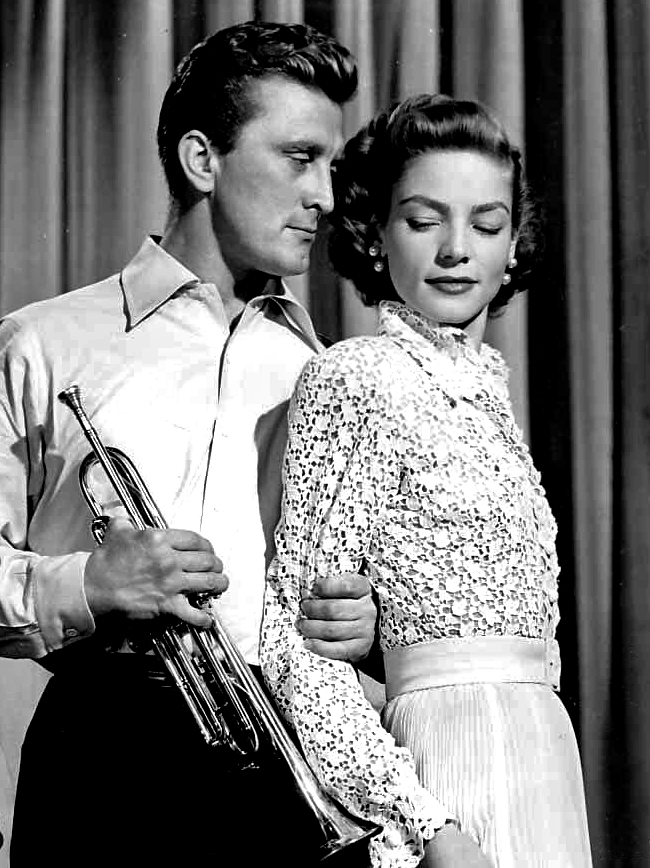
Kirk Douglas and Lauren Bacall in Young Man with a Horn (1950)

Curtiz's films continued to cover a wide range of genres, including biopics, comedies, and musicals. Some of the box office successes and well-received films during the 1950s included Young Man with a Horn (1950), Jim Thorpe – All-American (1951), The Story of Will Rogers (1952), White Christmas (1954), We're No Angels (1955), and King Creole (1958).

Young Man with a Horn (1950) starred Kirk Douglas, Lauren Bacall, and Doris Day, with Douglas portraying the rise and fall of a driven jazz musician, based on real-life cornet player Bix Beiderbecke. Curtiz directed an actual biopic, Jim Thorpe – All-American (1951), this time starring Burt Lancaster, based on the true story of a Native American athlete who won more gold medals than any other athlete at the 1912 Summer Olympics in Stockholm. The film received plaudits as one of the most compelling of all sports movies.

Curtiz followed with I'll See You in My Dreams (1952), with Doris Day and Danny Thomas. The film is a musical biography of lyricist Gus Kahn. It was Day's fourth film directed by Curtiz, who first auditioned her and gave her a starring role in her debut film, Romance on the High Seas (1948). She was shocked at being offered a lead in her first film, and admitted to Curtiz that she was a singer without acting experience. What Curtiz liked about her after the audition was that "she was honest," he said, not afraid to tell him she was not an actress. That, and the observation "her freckles made her look like the All-American Girl," he said. Day would be the discovery he boasted about most later in his career.

The Story of Will Rogers (1952), also a biography, told the story of the humorist and movie star Will Rogers, played by Will Rogers Jr., his son.

The long partnership between Curtiz and Warner Bros., eventually descended into a bitter court battle in the early 1950s. After his relationship with Warner Bros. broke down, Curtiz continued to direct on a freelance basis from 1954 onwards. The Egyptian (1954, based on Mika Waltari's novel) for Fox starred Jean Simmons, Victor Mature, and Gene Tierney. He directed many films for Paramount, including White Christmas, We're No Angels, and King Creole. White Christmas (1954), Curtiz's second adaptation of an Irving Berlin musical, was a major box-office success, the highest-grossing film of 1954. It starred Bing Crosby, Danny Kaye, Rosemary Clooney, and Vera-Ellen.

Curtiz directed The Scarlet Hour (1956), which starred newcomers Carol Ohmart and Tom Tryon. It was reported that Curtiz was temperamental and disliked the script. The film was a commercial failure.

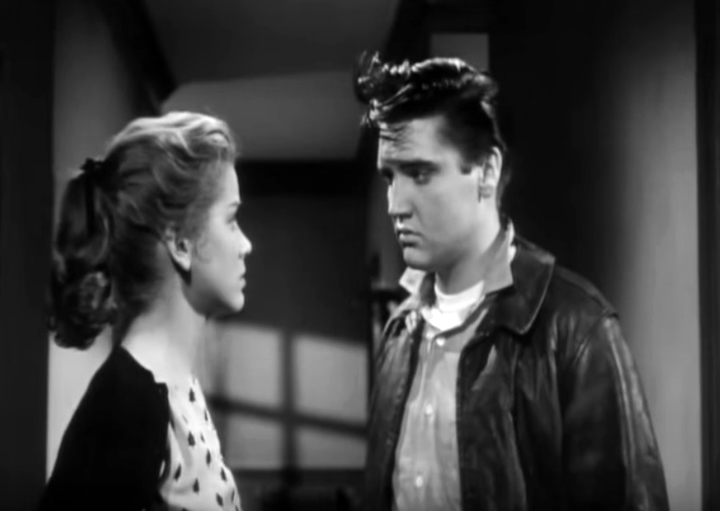
Elvis in King Creole

Another musical, King Creole (1958), starred Elvis Presley and Carolyn Jones. When asked to direct Presley, who was then the "king of rock and roll", Curtiz could only laugh, assuming Presley would be unable to act. After a few conversations with him, however, his opinion changed: "I began to sit up and take notice," Curtiz said, adding, "I guarantee that he'll amaze everyone. He shows formidable talent. What's more, he'll get the respect he so dearly desires." During filming, Presley was always the first one on the set. When he was told what to do, regardless of how unusual or difficult, he said simply, "You're the boss, Mr. Curtiz."

No, this is a lovely boy, and he's going to be a wonderful actor.

— Michael Curtiz, after first meeting Elvis

The script, the music, and the acting all came together to produce a remarkable picture, the likes of which Presley never again matched in his career. It received good reviews: Variety magazine declared that the film "Shows the young star [Presley] as a better than fair actor". The New York Times also gave it a favorable review: "As for Mr. Presley, in his third screen attempt, it's a pleasure to find him up to a little more than Bourbon Street shoutin' and wigglin'. Acting is his assignment in this shrewdly upholstered showcase, and he does it, so help us, over a picket fence." Presley later thanked Curtiz for giving him the opportunity to show his potential as an actor; of his 33 films, Elvis considered it his favorite.

The final film that Curtiz directed was The Comancheros, released six months before his death from cancer on April 10, 1962. Curtiz was ill during the shoot, but star John Wayne took over directing on the days Curtiz was too ill to work. Wayne did not want to take a co-director credit.

== Directing style ==
=== Preparation ===
Curtiz always invested the time necessary to prepare all aspects of a film before shooting. "As far as I am concerned," he said, "the chief work in directing a film is in preparing a story for the screen ... Nothing is as important ... A director can be likened to the field general of an army. He should know more clearly than anyone else what is coming, what to expect ... I believe this as a sound working plan."

By putting time into preparation, he cut down on delays after production started, which gave him the ability to put out about six films a year until the 1940s. He turned out Front Page Woman (1935) in only three weeks, despite its rapid-fire newspaper dialogue with Bette Davis, then turned around and made Captain Blood almost entirely on the sound stage without having to leave the studio.

=== Cinematography ===
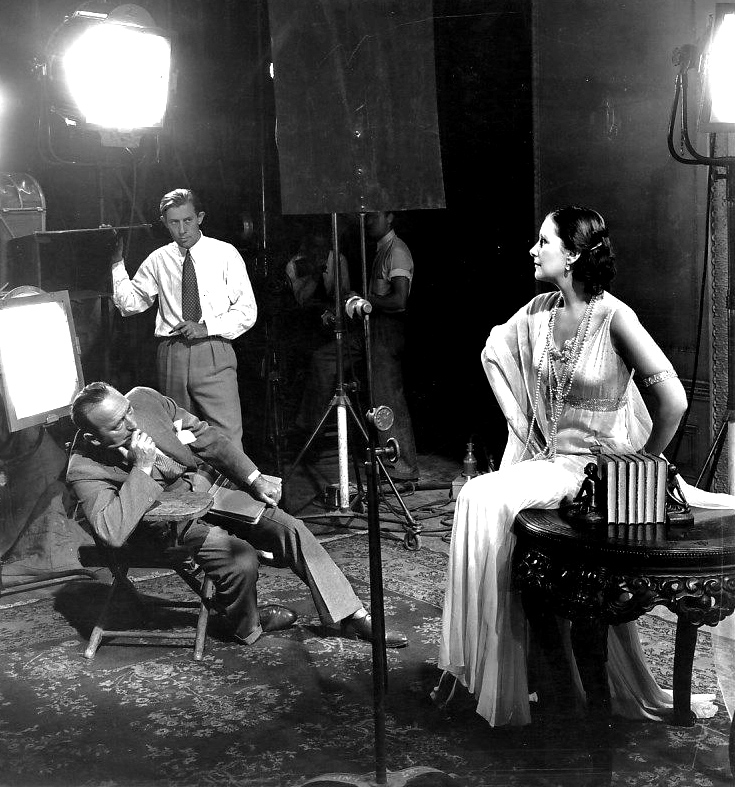
Curtiz planning how best to photograph a scene with Lil Dagover in 1932

Sidney Rosenzweig argues that Curtiz had his own personal style, which was in place by the time of his move to America: "high crane shots to establish a story's environment; unusual camera angles and complex compositions in which characters are often framed by physical objects; much camera movement; subjective shots, in which the camera becomes the character's eye; and high contrast lighting with pools of shadows". Aljean Harmetz states that, "Curtiz's vision of any movie... was almost totally a visual one".

A few months after arriving in Hollywood as Warner Bros.' new director, Curtiz explained that he wanted to make viewers feel as though they were actually witnessing a story on screen:

To accomplish this end the camera must assume many personalities. For the most part it assumes the personality of the audience. At moments when the interest is high and the illusion of the audience is greatest, the camera alternately places itself in the position of the various characters, as the dramatic burden shifts from actor to actor. This entails much movement of the camera. If it cuts off at each position so that it seems to jump from place to place, the effect is noticeable and the reception of the story is marred. In many cases, therefore, the camera must move from position to position without stopping, just as a person would.

In preparing scenes, Curtiz liked to compare himself to an artist, painting with characters, light, motion, and background on a canvas. However, during his career, this "individualism," says Robertson, "was hidden from public view" and undervalued because, unlike many other directors, Curtiz's films covered such a wide spectrum of different genres. He was therefore seen by many as a versatile master technician who worked under Warner Bros.' direction, rather than as an auteur with a unique and recognizable style.

Hal B. Wallis, the producer of many of Curtiz's films, including Robin Hood, was always watchful over budgets. He wrote to Jack Warner during the shooting of that film, "In his enthusiasm to make great shots and composition and utilize the great production values in this picture, he is, of course, more likely to go overboard than anyone else ... I did not try to stop Mike yesterday when he was on the crane and making establishing shots."

Curtiz himself rarely expressed his philosophy or filmmaking style in writing since he was always too busy making films, so no autobiography and only a few media interviews exist. His brother observed that Curtiz was "shy, almost humble," in his private life, as opposed to his "take-charge" attitude at work. His brother added that "he did not want anybody to write a book about him. He refused to even talk about the idea." When Curtiz was once asked to sum up his philosophy of making movies, he said, "I put all the art into my pictures that I think the audience can stand."

=== Types of stories ===
Before coming to Hollywood, Curtiz always considered the story before he began working on a film. The human-interest side of a story was key, along with having the plot develop as the film progressed. He explains:

First I look for "human interest" when a story is given me. If that interest is predominant over the action then I believe the story is good. Always it is my desire to tell that story as if the camera were a person relating the incidents of a happening.

I hate to see young directors throwing stories back at the studio. They should never throw a single one back because they do not think it is a good story. They should accept them gratefully ... That is the way they will learn.

— Michael Curtiz

His attitude did not change when he joined a large studio, despite being given large spectacles to direct. As late as the 1940s, he still preferred "homey pictures." He said it was "because I want to deal with human and fundamental problems of real people. That is the basis of all good drama. It is true even in a spectacle, where you must never forget the underlying humanity and identity of your characters no matter how splendid the setting or situations are." However, he also felt that even with the same story, any five different directors would produce five distinctive versions. "No two would be alike," he said, as each director's "work is reflection of himself."

Film historian Peter Wollen says that throughout Curtiz's career, his films portrayed characters who had to "deal with injustice, oppression, entrapment, displacement, and exile." He cites examples of Curtiz films to support that: 20,000 Years in Sing Sing (1932) dealt with the theme of social alienation, while Captain Blood, The Adventures of Robin Hood, and The Sea Hawk all concerned a tyrant monarch who was threatening the freedom of ordinary Englishmen. Wollen states:

The case for Curtiz as an auteur rests on his incredible ability to find the right style for the right picture. If he shows a thematic consistency across several genres, it is in his consistent preference for stressing the struggles of the rebel and the downtrodden against the entrenched and powerful.

=== Personal habits ===
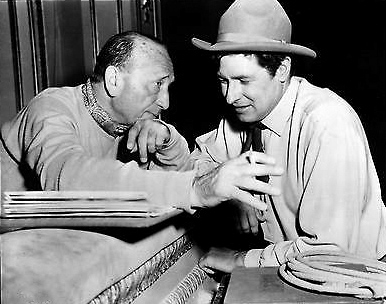
Curtiz with Will Rogers, Jr., in 1952

Curtiz was always extremely active: he worked very long days, took part in several sports in his spare time, and was often found to sleep under a cold shower. He skipped lunches since they interfered with his work and he felt they often made him tired. He was therefore dismissive of actors who ate lunch, believing that "lunch bums" had no energy for work in the afternoons.

Wallis said he was "a demon for work." He arose each morning at 5 am and typically remained at the studio until 8 or 9 pm. He hated to go home at the end of the day, said Wallis. With his high energy level, he also attended to every minute detail on the set.

To broaden his life experiences in the U.S., since he seldom traveled outside of Hollywood, when he did go on location shoots he tended to be restless and curious about everything in the area. Producer Wallis, who was often with him, observed that he explored everything:

He had a thirst for knowledge; he wanted to see the poolrooms, the flophouses, the Chinese sections, the slums—everything strange and exotic and seedy so that he could add to the knowledge that gave his pictures their amazing degree of realism.

He earned the nickname "Iron Mike" from his friends, since he tried to keep physically fit by playing polo when he had time, and owned a stable of horses for his recreation at home. He attributed his fitness and level of energy solely to sober living. Even with his vast success and wealth over the years, he did not allow himself "to be fondled in the lap of luxury."

=== Working with colleagues ===
The down side of his dedication was an often callous demeanor, which many attributed to his Hungarian roots. Fay Wray, who worked with Curtiz on Mystery of the Wax Museum, said, "I felt that he was not flesh and bones, that he was part of the steel of the camera". Curtiz was not popular with most of his colleagues, many of whom thought him arrogant. Nor did he deny that, explaining, "When I see a lazy man or a don't care girl, it makes me tough. I am very critical of actors, but if I find a real actor, I am first to appreciate them."

No matter what the story is, Mr. Curtiz is never at a loss. If it's about American small-town life, he is as American as Sinclair Lewis. If it's about Paris, he's as continental as Maurice Chevalier. And if it's a mystery, he's as good a teller of mystery tales as S. S. Van Dine. But English has him stumped.

— Film columnist George Ross

Nevertheless, Bette Davis, who was little known in 1932, made five more films with him, although they argued consistently when filming The Cabin in the Cotton (1932), one of her earliest roles. He had a low opinion of actors in general, saying that acting "is fifty percent a big bag of tricks. The other fifty percent should be talent and ability, although it seldom is." Overall, he got along well enough with his stars, as shown by his ability to attract and keep some of the best actors in Hollywood. He got along very well with Claude Rains, whom he directed in ten films.

He spoke terrible English; his English was always a joke on the set. But the dialog in his films is wonderfully given and directed.

— Film historian David Thomson

Curtiz struggled with English as he was too busy filming to learn the language. He sometimes used pantomimes to show what he wanted an actor to do, which led to many amusing anecdotes about his choice of words when directing. David Niven never forgot Curtiz's saying to "bring on the empty horses" when he wanted to "bring out the horses without riders," so much so that he used it for the title of his memoir. Similar stories abound: For the final scene in Casablanca Curtiz asked the set designer for a "poodle" on the ground so the wet steps of the actors could be seen on camera. The next day the set designer brought a little dog not realizing Curtiz meant "puddle" not "poodle". But not all actors who worked under Curtiz were as amused by his malapropisms. Edward G. Robinson, whom Curtiz directed in The Sea Wolf, had a different opinion about language handicaps by foreigners to Hollywood:

They could fill a book. Even if I did not suspect you'd heard them all, I long ago decided that I would not bore myself or you with Curtizisms, Pasternakisms, Goldwynisms, or Gaborisms. Too many writers have made a cottage industry of reporting the misuse of the English language by Hollywood people.

== Personal life ==
When he left for the United States, Curtiz left behind an illegitimate son and an illegitimate daughter. Around 1918, he married actress Lucy Doraine, and they divorced in 1923. He had a lengthy affair with Lili Damita starting in 1925 and is sometimes reported to have married her, but film scholar Alan K. Rode states in his 2017 biography of Curtiz that this is a modern legend, and there is no contemporary evidence to support it. Their obituaries make no mention of such a marriage.

Curtiz had left Europe before the rise of Nazism: other members of his family were less fortunate. He once asked Jack Warner, who was going to Budapest in 1938, to contact his family and help them get exit visas. Warner succeeded in getting Curtiz's mother to the U.S., where she spent the rest of her life living with her son. He could not rescue Curtiz's only sister, her husband, or their three children, who were sent to Auschwitz, where her husband and two of the children were murdered.

Curtiz paid part of his own salary into the European Film Fund, a benevolent association which helped European refugees in the film business establish themselves in the U.S.

In 1933, Curtiz became a naturalized U.S. citizen. By the early 1940s, he had become fairly wealthy, earning $3,600 per week and owning a substantial estate, complete with polo pitch. One of his regular polo partners was Hal B. Wallis, who had met Curtiz on his arrival in the country and had established a close friendship with him. Wallis' wife, the actress Louise Fazenda and Curtiz's third wife, Bess Meredyth, an actress and screenwriter, had been close since before Curtiz's marriage to Meredyth in 1929. Curtiz had numerous affairs; Meredyth once left him for a short time but they remained married until 1961, when they separated. They remained married until his death. She was Curtiz's helper whenever his need to deal with scripts or other elements went beyond his grasp of English and he often phoned her for advice when presented with a problem while filming.

Curtiz was the stepfather of movie and television director John Meredyth Lucas, who talks about him in his autobiography Eighty Odd Years in Hollywood.

Many actors expressed frustrations in working with Curtiz; James Cagney said he was "a pompous bastard who didn't know how to treat actors." Cary Grant swore he would never work with him again after his experience filming Night and Day.

== Death ==
Curtiz died from cancer on April 10, 1962, aged 75. At the time of his death, he was living alone in a small apartment in Sherman Oaks, California. He is interred in the Forest Lawn Memorial Park Cemetery in Glendale, California.

== Legacy ==
Michael Curtiz is the classic example of a studio director in that he could turn his hand to almost anything. He could go from any genre to another, and somehow this Hungarian knew exactly how those genres worked. Like there was some innate storytelling skill in this man.

— Film historian David Thomson

Curtiz directed some of the best known films of the 20th century, achieving numerous award-winning performances from actors. Before moving to Hollywood from his native Hungary when he was 38 years of age, he had already directed 64 films in Europe. He soon helped Warner Bros. become the nation's fastest-growing studio, directing 102 films during his career in Hollywood, more than any other director. Jack Warner, who first discovered Curtiz after seeing one of his epics in Europe, called him "Warner Brothers' greatest director."

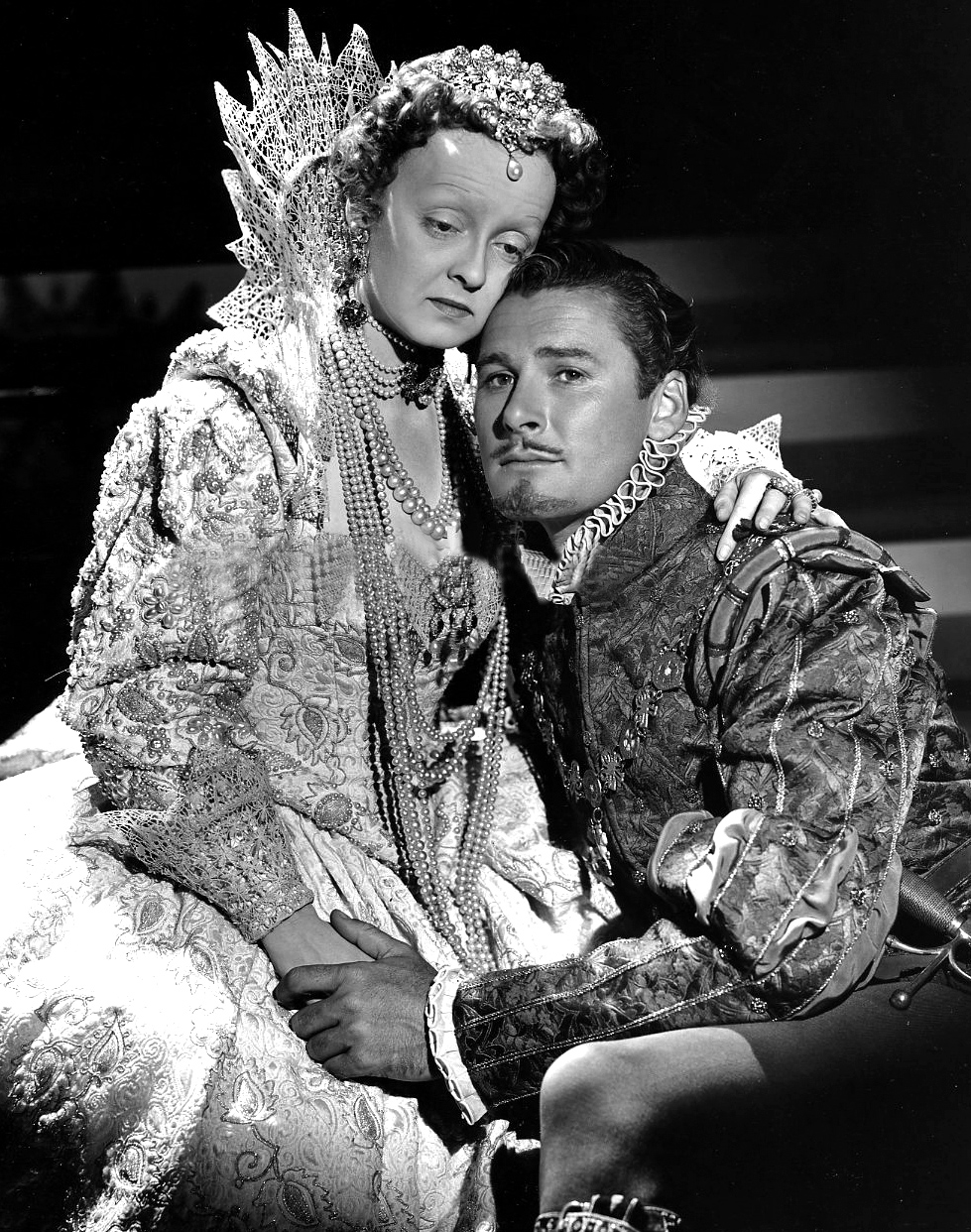
Davis and Flynn in The Private Lives of Elizabeth and Essex (1939)

He directed 10 actors to Oscar nominations: Paul Muni, John Garfield, James Cagney, Walter Huston, Humphrey Bogart, Claude Rains, Joan Crawford, Ann Blyth, Eve Arden, and William Powell. Cagney and Crawford won their only Academy Awards under Curtiz's direction, with Cagney on TV later attributing part of his success to "the unforgettable Michael Curtiz." Curtiz himself was nominated five times and won as Best Director for Casablanca.

He earned a reputation as a harsh taskmaster to his actors, as he micromanaged every detail on the set. With his background as director since 1912, his experience and dedication to the art made him a perfectionist. He had an astounding mastery of technical details. Hal B. Wallis, who produced a number of his major films, including Casablanca, said Curtiz had always been his favorite director:

He was a superb director with an amazing command of lighting, mood and action. He could handle any kind of picture: melodrama, comedy, Western, historical epic or love story.

Some, such as screenwriter Robert Rossen, ask whether Curtiz has "been misjudged by cinema history," since he is not included among those often considered to be great directors, such as John Ford, Howard Hawks, Orson Welles and Alfred Hitchcock: "He was obviously a talent highly alert to the creative movements of his time such as German expressionism, the genius of the Hollywood studio system, genres such as film noir, and the possibilities offered by talented stars."

Film historian Catherine Portuges has described Curtiz as one of the "most enigmatic of film directors, and often underrated." Film theorist Peter Wollen wanted "to resurrect" Curtiz's critical reputation, observing that with his enormous experience and drive, he "could wring unexpected meanings from a script through his direction of actors and cinematographers."

The American Film Institute ranked Casablanca #3 and Yankee Doodle Dandy #98 on its list of the greatest American movies. The Adventures of Robin Hood and Mildred Pierce were nominated for the list.

== Academy Award nominations ==
Year	Award	Film	Result
1935	Best Director (as write-in candidate)	Captain Blood	John Ford – The Informer
1938	Best Director	Angels with Dirty Faces	Frank Capra – You Can't Take It with You
1938	Best Director	Four Daughters	Frank Capra – You Can't Take It with You
1939	Best Short Subject	Sons of Liberty	Won
1942	Best Director	Yankee Doodle Dandy	William Wyler – Mrs. Miniver
1943	Best Director	Casablanca	Won

Six of Curtiz's films were nominated for Best Picture: Captain Blood (1935), The Adventures of Robin Hood (1938), Four Daughters (1938), Yankee Doodle Dandy (1942), Casablanca (1943), and Mildred Pierce (1945). Of these, only Casablanca won Best Picture.

=== Directed Academy Award performances ===
Year	Performer	Film	Result
Academy Award for Best Actor
1935	Paul Muni	Black Fury (write-in candidate)	Nominated
1938	James Cagney	Angels with Dirty Faces	Nominated
1942	James Cagney	Yankee Doodle Dandy	Won
1943	Humphrey Bogart	Casablanca	Nominated
1947	William Powell	Life with Father	Nominated
Academy Award for Best Actress
1945	Joan Crawford	Mildred Pierce	Won
Academy Award for Best Supporting Actor
1938	John Garfield	Four Daughters	Nominated
1942	Walter Huston	Yankee Doodle Dandy	Nominated
1943	Claude Rains	Casablanca	Nominated
Academy Award for Best Supporting Actress
1945	Eve Arden	Mildred Pierce	Nominated
1945	Ann Blyth	Mildred Pierce	Nominated

== Selected Hollywood filmography ==
- Tenderloin (1928) with Delores Costello and Conrad Nagel (lost film)
- Noah's Ark (1928) with Delores Costello
- The Mad Genius (1931) with John Barrymore and Marian Marsh
- The Cabin in the Cotton (1932) with Richard Barthelmess and Bette Davis
- Doctor X (1932) with Fay Wray and Lionel Atwill
- Goodbye Again (1933) with Warren William and Joan Blondell
- 20,000 Years in Sing Sing (1933) with Spencer Tracy and Bette Davis
- Mystery of the Wax Museum (1933) with Lionel Atwill, Fay Wray, and Glenda Farrell
- The Kennel Murder Case (1933) with William Powell as Philo Vance
- Jimmy the Gent (1934) with James Cagney and Bette Davis
- British Agent (1934) with Leslie Howard and Kay Francis
- Black Fury (1935) with Paul Muni
- Front Page Woman (1935) with Bette Davis and George Brent
- Captain Blood (1935) with Errol Flynn and Olivia de Havilland
- Kid Galahad (1937) with Edward G. Robinson, Bette Davis and Humphrey Bogart
- The Adventures of Robin Hood (1938) with Errol Flynn, Olivia de Havilland, Claude Rains and Basil Rathbone
- Four Daughters (1938) with John Garfield and Claude Rains
- Angels with Dirty Faces (1938) with James Cagney and Humphrey Bogart
- Dodge City (1939) with Errol Flynn and Bruce Cabot
- The Private Lives of Elizabeth and Essex (1939) with Bette Davis, Errol Flynn and Olivia de Havilland
- Santa Fe Trail (1940) with Errol Flynn, Olivia de Havilland and Ronald Reagan
- Virginia City (1940) with Errol Flynn and Randolph Scott
- The Sea Hawk (1940) with Errol Flynn and Alan Hale Sr.
- The Sea Wolf (1941) with Edward G. Robinson and John Garfield
- Dive Bomber (1941) with Fred MacMurray and Ralph Bellamy
- Captains of the Clouds (1942) with James Cagney and famed fighter pilot Billy Bishop
- Casablanca (1942) with Humphrey Bogart and Ingrid Bergman
- Yankee Doodle Dandy (1942) with James Cagney and Walter Huston
- Mission to Moscow (1943) with Walter Huston
- Mildred Pierce (1945) with Joan Crawford and Ann Blyth
- Night and Day (1946) with Cary Grant as Cole Porter
- Life with Father (1947) with William Powell, Irene Dunne and Elizabeth Taylor
- Romance on the High Seas (1948); Doris Day's movie debut
- The Breaking Point (1950) with John Garfield and Patricia Neal
- I'll See You in My Dreams (1951), a biographical film of composer and lyricist Gus Kahn, with Doris Day and Danny Thomas
- The Jazz Singer (1952), a remake with Danny Thomas and Peggy Lee
- White Christmas (1954) with Bing Crosby and Rosemary Clooney
- The Egyptian (1954) with Jean Simmons, Victor Mature and Gene Tierney
- We're No Angels (1955) with Humphrey Bogart and Peter Ustinov
- The Vagabond King (1956) with Oreste Kirkop, Kathryn Grayson and Rita Moreno
- The Proud Rebel (1958) with Alan Ladd and Olivia de Havilland
- King Creole (1958) with Elvis Presley and Walter Matthau
- The Man in the Net (1959) with Alan Ladd and Carolyn Jones
- The Adventures of Huckleberry Finn (1960) with Eddie Hodges, Tony Randall and Patty McCormack
- The Comancheros (1961) with John Wayne and Stuart Whitman

=== Musicals ===
Year	Title	Starring	Notes
1942	Yankee Doodle Dandy	James Cagney & Joan Leslie	
1943	This is the Army	George Murphy, Joan Leslie, & Ronald Reagan	An Irving Berlin Film
1946	Night and Day	Cary Grant, Alexis Smith, & Monty Woolley	
1948	Romance on the High Seas	Jack Carson, Doris Day, & Janis Paige	
1950	Young Man with a Horn	Kirk Douglas, Lauren Bacall, & Doris Day	
1952	The Jazz Singer	Danny Thomas & Peggy Lee	
1954	White Christmas	Bing Crosby, Danny Kaye, Rosemary Clooney, & Vera-Ellen	An Irving Berlin Film
