= Circle of Danger =

1951 British film by Jacques Tourneur

- Directed by: Jacques Tourneur
- Screenplay by: Philip Macdonald
- Produced by: Joan Harrison; David Rose; John R. Sloan
- Starring: Ray Milland; Patricia Roc
- Cinematography: Oswald Morris; Gilbert Taylor
- Edited by: Alan Osbiston
- Music by: Robert Farnon
- Production company: Coronado Productions (England) Limited
- Distributed by: RKO Radio Pictures (UK)
- Release date: 21 May 1951
- Running time: 86 minutes
- Country: United Kingdom
- Language: English
- Budget: $700,000

Circle of Danger (also known as White Heather) is a 1951 British thriller film directed by Jacques Tourneur starring Ray Milland, Patricia Roc, Marius Goring, Hugh Sinclair and Naunton Wayne. The screenplay was by Philip MacDonald.

== Plot ==
American Clay Douglas travels to England to discover the truth behind his brother's death during the Second World War.

== Cast ==
- Ray Milland as Clay Douglas
- Patricia Roc as Elspeth Graham
- Marius Goring as Sholto Lewis
- Hugh Sinclair as Hamish McArran
- Naunton Wayne as Reggie Sinclair
- Edward Rigby as Idwal Llewellyn
- Marjorie Fielding as Margaret McArran
- John Bailey as Pape Llewellyn
- Colin Gordon as Col. Fairbairn
- Dora Bryan as Bubbles Fitzgerald
- Reginald Beckwith as Oliver
- David Hutcheson as Tony Wrexham
- Michael Brennan as Bert Oakshott
- Peter Butterworth as Ernie (the diver) (uncredited)

== Critical reception ==
The Monthly Film Bulletin wrote: "The story is on the face of it improbable and is made unnecessarily tedious by the manner in which the hero is shown sampling as many aspects of English life as can be fitted in. We are soon aware that he is in no real danger; only in its final sequences does the film come anywhere near living up to its title. Ray Milland portrays with naive good faith the type of American for whom all English women are supposed to fall; the rest of the cast are adequate to their stock parts, and the backgrounds are, on the whole, authentic."

Variety wrote: "Despite a novel approach to a melodramatic theme, Circle of Danger is too slowly paced to build much audience excitement or suspense."

In The New York Times its anonymous reviewer wrote: "British restraint in acting and dialogue is almost painfully evident throughout the proceedings". Although Milland's acting is praised for its "naturalness, a quality which, it might be added, may be due in part to the unadorned and often expert dialogue turned out by Philip MacDonald", the film despite a decent British supporting cast, "is still an unexciting and largely placid adventure".

Dennis Schwartz wrote of the film in 2013: "Though routine, the highly skilled Tourneur does his best to keep it lively, watchable and enjoyable."
