= Laird Doyle =

American screenwriter (1907–1936)

Laird Houston Doyle
- Born: August 27, 1907; Ashley, Illinois; United States
- Died: November 2, 1936 (aged 29); Glendale, California; United States
- Occupation: Writer
- Years active: 1932 – 1936 (film)

Laird Houston Doyle (August 27, 1907 – November 2, 1936) was an American screenwriter. Doyle was under contract to Warner Brothers during the mid-1930s, before his sudden death at the age of twenty-nine. One of his final films was the British comedy Strangers on Honeymoon. Some of his screenplay work was used posthumously, his last credited film being in 1947.

Scenario writer for more than 20 motion pictures from 1932 until his death. Born in Ashley, Illinois, to William H. Doyle (1873-1937), a former Reno bank official turned real estate agent in Los Angeles, and Emma Laird (1880-1956), he began his professional career as a newspaperman in San Francisco before joining KNX Radio as a writer-producer.

Doyle spent most of his film career at Warner Brothers. Films he either adapted, wrote screenplays or dialogue for included Sing and Like It (1934), Finishing School (1934), The Key (1934), Oil for the Lamps of China (1935), Front Page Woman (1935), Stars over Broadway (1935), Special Agent (1935), Dangerous (1935), Hearts Divided (1936), Cain and Mabel (1936), Three Men On a Horse (1936), Strangers on Honeymoon (1936), The Prince and the Pauper (1937), and San Quentin (1937).

He died of a fractured skull and other multiple injuries at Physicians' and Surgeons' Hospital in Glendale, California, within an hour after the plane he was flying solo banked too steeply and crashed near the Grand Central Air Terminal in Glendale. He left his wife Mary and an infant daughter. His obituary appeared in the "Milestones" section of Time Magazine's Nov. 16, 1936, issue. His final film credit, Northwest Outpost (1947), appeared over a decade after his premature death.

== Filmography ==
- Hell Below (1933)
- Jimmy the Gent (1934)
- The Key (1934)
- British Agent (1934)
- Bordertown (1935)
- Front Page Woman (1935)
- Special Agent (1935)
- Dangerous (1935)
- Strangers on Honeymoon (1936)
- Hearts Divided (1936)
- Cain and Mabel (1936)
- The Prince and the Pauper (1937)
- San Quentin (1937)
- Another Dawn (1937)
- Singapore Woman (1941)
- Northwest Outpost (1947)

== Bibliography ==
- Brown, Geoff. Launder and Gilliat. British Film Institute, 1977.
