= Strangers on Honeymoon =

- Original lobby card
- Directed by: Albert de Courville
- Written by: Laird Doyle; Sidney Gilliat; Julian Houston; Ralph Spence; Bryan Edgar Wallace
- Based on: novel The Northing Tramp by Edgar Wallace
- Produced by: Haworth Bromley
- Starring: Constance Cummings; Hugh Sinclair; Noah Beery; Beatrix Lehmann
- Cinematography: Mutz Greenbaum
- Edited by: Cyril Randell
- Music by: Jack Beaver
- Production company: Gaumont British
- Distributed by: Gaumont British Distributors
- Release date: 18 January 1937
- Running time: 66 minutes
- Country: United Kingdom
- Language: English

Strangers on Honeymoon (also known as Strangers on a Honeymoon and The Northing Tramp) is a 1936 British comedy film directed by Albert de Courville and starring Constance Cummings, Hugh Sinclair and Noah Beery. It was written by Laird Doyle, Sidney Gilliat, Julian Houston, Ralph Spence and Bryan Edgar Wallace, based on the 1926 novel The Northing Tramp by Edgar Wallace.

== Plot ==
Young orphan October flees from an arranged marriage with Wilfred, to wed gentleman tramp Quigley for a bet. However, Quigley is secretly an English nobleman on the run for a murder he did not commit. Events escalate when a cousin of the jilted Wilfred hires a pair of hoodlums to bump off Quigley.

== Cast ==
- Constance Cummings as October Jones
- Hugh Sinclair as Elliott Quigley
- Noah Beery as Redbeard
- Beatrix Lehmann as Elfrida Valentine
- David Burns as Lennie
- Butler Hixon as Sam Wasser
- Maurice Freeman as Uncle Elmer Crinklaw
- James Arnold as Wilfred H. Thompson, the bridegroom
- Tucker McGuire as bride
- Edmund Breon as Sir Gregory Andrews
- Skelton Knaggs
- Conway Palmer
- Percy Parsons as Minister (uncredited)
- Sara Allgood as housekeeper (uncredited)
- Edmon Ryan

== Production ==
The film was made by Gainsborough Pictures at the Lime Grove Studios in Shepherd's Bush with sets designed by the art director Ernö Metzner.

== Reception ==
The Monthly Film Bulletin wrote: "This film version of Edgar Wallace's The Northing Tramp is a curious mixture of melodrama, romance, fooling, chases and thrills which do not always blend satisfactorily. But it is put over so light-heartedly and good-humouredly that the result is pleasant and breezy, if rather naive entertainment. Constance Cummings and Hugh Sinclair enter into the spirit of the thing, and play well together. It is a little difficult to see what the Director had in mind in making so clever an artist as Beatrix Lehmann over-act her part in the way she does."

Kine Weekly wrote: "An irresponsible adventure comedy melodrama, this picture frequently promotes hearty laughs, but it is a little too incongruous a mixture of rough stuff, romance and repartee to acquire the characteristics of really super entertainment. Seeing is not always believing – that's the snag. ... Constance Cummings and Hugh Sinclair make quite a good pair as October and Quigley. They avoid criticism by not taking their parts or the story too seriously; but Beatrice Lehmann grossly overacts as Elfrida, and Edmund Breon is not much better as Sir Andrew."

Picturegoer wrote: "There are occasional flashes of wit and some serial-like action. Its main asset is that it is put over enthusiastically both by director and cast."

Variety wrote: "An outmoded story, redeemed by an abundance of comedy and up-to-date wisecracks. ... Admirably produced and directed in American fashion, and well played by the stars."
