= Never Look Back (film) =

1952 film

- Directed by: Francis Searle
- Written by: John Hunter; Guy Morgan; Francis Searle
- Produced by: Michael Carreras
- Starring: Rosamund John; Hugh Sinclair; Guy Middleton; Henry Edwards
- Cinematography: Reginald H. Wyer
- Edited by: John Ferris
- Music by: Temple Abady
- Production company: Hammer Films
- Distributed by: Exclusive Films
- Release date: 26 May 1952; (UK)
- Running time: 73 minutes
- Country: United Kingdom
- Language: English

Never Look Back is a 1952 British second feature ('B') drama film directed by Francis Searle and starring Rosamund John, Hugh Sinclair and Guy Middleton. The screenplay concerns a newly appointed female barrister whose career is threatened by a former lover. It was made by Hammer Films at the Mancunian Studios in Manchester. This was Michael Carreras' first film as a producer, and he brought the film in right on schedule. Filming began Sept. 17, 1951, and it was trade shown at the Rialto on March 19, 1952. It opened at the Odeon on May 26, and did rather poorly, mainly due to the film's lack of recognizable name actors. From this time on, Hammer tried to make sure that each film they produced featured at least one well-known actor.

== Plot ==
Anne Maitland is a newly-appointed King's Counseller. She receives an unexpected late-night visit from ex-boyfriend Guy Ransome. When Ransome is later accused of murdering his mistress on the same night, Anne takes on his defence. In a court battle against Nigel Stewart, a barrister who is madly in love with her, Anne clears Ransome of murder by disclosing her intimate relationship with him, and stating that he was staying in her flat on the night of the crime. However, when it is discovered that Ransome did indeed commit the murder, Anne's reputation is left in tatters. However, her professional failure enables her to marry Stewart, who is no longer a professional threat to her.

== Cast ==
- Rosamund John as Anne Maitland, KC
- Hugh Sinclair as Nigel Stewart
- Guy Middleton as Guy Ransome
- Henry Edwards as Geoffrey Whitcomb
- Terence Longdon as Alan Whitcomb
- John Warwick as Inspector Raynor
- Brenda de Banzie as Molly Wheeler
- Arthur Howard as Charles Vaughan
- Bruce Belfrage as the Judge
- Fanny Rowe as Liz
- H.S. Hills as Frank Lindsell
- Hélène Burls as Mrs Brock
- Bill Shine as Willie
- Timothy Bateson as court official
- Harry H. Corbett as policeman in charge cells
- June Mitchell as secretary
- Barbara Shaw as press woman
- David Scase as cameraman
- Norman Somers as Nigel's Junior
- Peter Jeffrey as court reporter

== Critical reception ==
The Monthly Film Bulletin wrote: "To outline the story is to emphasise its weakness and improbability. On the screen, however, it has been made to seem quite plausible and improves as it progresses, with a convincing court scene, The tempo, though, is too slow to sustain excitement."

Kine Weekly wrote: "The characterisation and atmosphere are quite good, and smooth presentation gives its neat, if slightly theatrical, plot validity and penultimate punch."

TV Guide gave the film two out of four stars, and wrote, "the British legal system is invested with enough romantic drama to rival a soap opera in this intriguing thriller."

In British Sound Films: The Studio Years 1928–1959 David Quinlan rated the film as "average", writing: "Contrived thriller with a good climax; first half pretty slow."
