= Red Smith (shortstop) =

American baseball player (1899-1961)

- Shortstop
- Born: July 17, 1899; Ashley, Illinois, U.S.
- Died: February 19, 1961 (aged 61); Los Angeles, California, U.S.
- Batted: Left Threw: Right

MLB debut
- April 14, 1925, for the Philadelphia Athletics

Last MLB appearance
- September 26, 1925, for the Philadelphia Athletics

MLB statistics
- Batting average: .286
- Home runs: 0
- Runs batted in: 1
- Stats at Baseball Reference

Teams
- Philadelphia Athletics (1925)

Marvin Harold (Red) Smith (July 17, 1899 – February 19, 1961) was an American shortstop in Major League Baseball who played briefly for the Philadelphia Athletics in the 1925 season. Smith batted left-handed and threw right-handed. He was born in Ashley, Illinois.

In his one-season career, Smith was a .286 hitter (4-for-14) with one run and one RBI without home runs in 20 games played.

Smith died in Los Angeles, at the age of 61.
