= Dangerous (1935 film) =

1935 American drama film

- Theatrical release poster
- Directed by: Alfred E. Green
- Written by: Laird Doyle
- Produced by: Harry Joe Brown; Hal B. Wallis; Jack L. Warner
- Starring: Bette Davis; Franchot Tone; Margaret Lindsay
- Cinematography: Ernest Haller
- Edited by: Thomas Richards
- Music by: Ray Heindorf; Heinz Roemheld
- Distributed by: Warner Bros. Pictures
- Release date: December 25, 1935
- Running time: 79 minutes
- Country: United States
- Language: English
- Box office: $2.2 million

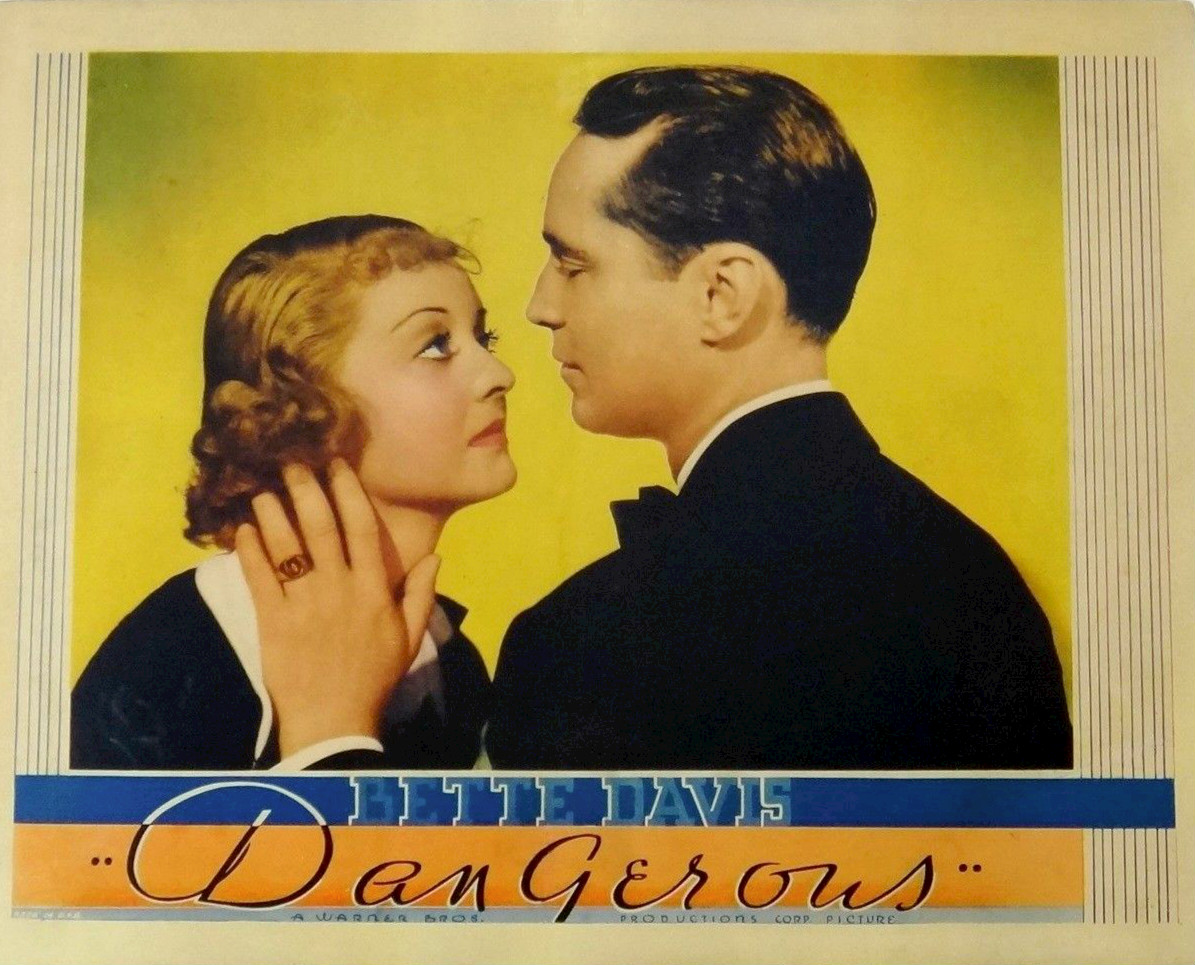
Bette Davis and Franchot Tone

Dangerous is a 1935 American drama film starring Bette Davis in her first Oscar-winning role. It was directed by Alfred E. Green to a screenplay by Laird Doyle based on his story Hard Luck Dame.

== Plot ==
Don Bellows, a prominent architect, is engaged to the beautiful and wealthy Gail Armitage when he meets down-and-out Joyce Heath, who was once the most promising young actress on Broadway. Don feels deeply indebted to Joyce because her performance as Juliet inspired him to become an architect.

While rehabilitating her, Don falls in love with the tempestuous actress. Joyce, convinced she destroys anything and anyone she touches, warns him she is a jinx. Compelled to save her, Don breaks his engagement to Gail and risks his fortune to back the actress in a Broadway show. Before opening night, he insists they marry, but Joyce resists his proposal, hiding the fact she is married to Gordon Heath, an ineffectual but devoted man who was financially ruined by their marriage.

Joyce goes to Gordon and begs him for a divorce. When he refuses, she causes an automobile accident that cripples him for life. Her own injuries keep her from opening in the show, which fails. Don is ruined, and when he learns that Joyce has deceived him, he accuses her of being a completely selfish woman, her only true jinx.

Joyce briefly considers suicide, but eventually sees the truth in Don's accusation. She re-opens the show and, although she truly loves Don, sends him away to marry Gail. The show is a success, and Joyce, then dedicated to a responsible life, goes to visit Gordon and salvage her marriage.

== Cast ==
- Bette Davis as Joyce Heath
- Franchot Tone as Don Bellows
- Margaret Lindsay as Gail Armitage
- Alison Skipworth as Mrs. Williams
- John Eldredge as Gordon Heath
- Dick Foran as Teddy
- Walter Walker as Roger Farnsworth
- Richard Carle as Pitt Hanley
- George Irving as Charles Melton
- Pierre Watkin as George Sheffield
- Douglas Wood as Elmont
- William B. Davidson as Reed Walsh (as William Davidson)

== Production ==
Bette Davis initially turned down the script, but Warner Bros. studio production chief Hal B. Wallis convinced her she could make something special out of the character, who had been inspired by one of Davis' idols, actress Jeanne Eagels. In fact, one of the characters in the film mentions how Eagels and Davis character Joyce are the only two actresses who can play the lead in the play "But to Die". Davis was determined to look like an actress on the skids, and insisted Orry-Kelly design costumes appropriate for a woman who had seen better days. It was for this film Perc Westmore styled her hair in the bob cut she would favor for the rest of her life.

Based on Laird Doyle's short story Hard Luck Dame, the $194,000 film had six working titles before producer Hal B. Wallis decided on Dangerous. The other titles were Hard Luck Dame, Evil Star (which Davis favored), The Jinx Woman, Forever Ends at Dawn, Tomorrow Ends and But to Die.

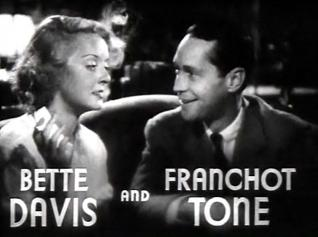

Franchot Tone, who recently had completed Mutiny on the Bounty, was borrowed from Metro-Goldwyn-Mayer to bolster Davis' marquee value.

Three songs by Harry Warren - "Forty-Second Street," "The Little Things You Used to Do," and "Sweet and Slow" - are heard on the soundtrack. The other song was "Bridal Chorus" by Richard Wagner.

In 1941, the film was remade as Singapore Woman as a second feature with Brenda Marshall in the lead role. It coincidentally used some of the sets from The Letter, the 1940 film starring Davis.

Davis won the Academy Award for Best Actress for her performance, but always felt it was a consolation prize for not having been nominated for Of Human Bondage the previous year, and believed that Katharine Hepburn should have won the award for her performance in another 1935 film, Alice Adams. In 2002, Steven Spielberg anonymously bought the Oscar Davis had won at auction at Sotheby's and returned it to the Academy of Motion Picture Arts and Sciences. The statuette had been part of the memorabilia displayed by the Planet Hollywood restaurant chain.

== Critical reception ==
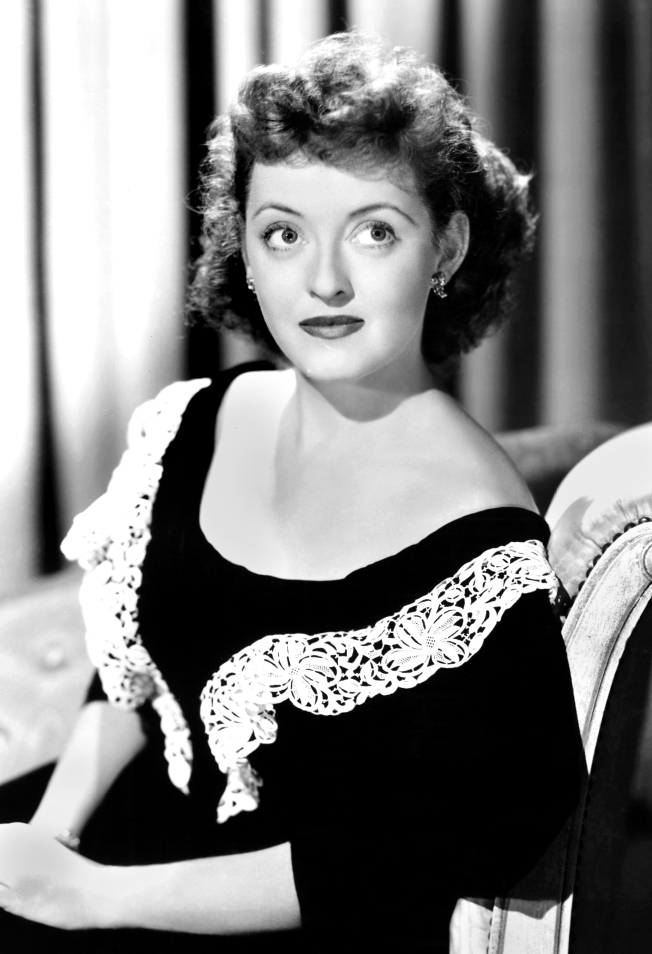
For her performance, Bette Davis won the Academy Award for Best Actress

Contemporary reviews were mixed.

The New York Times wrote "That Bette Davis has been unable to match the grim standard she set as Mildred in Of Human Bondage is not to her discredit. In Dangerous, she tries again. Except for a few sequences where the tension is convincing as well as deadly she fails...Say this for Miss Davis: she seldom lets down."

Variety wrote "Laird's dialog is adult, intelligent and has a rhythmic beat. Davis' performance is fine on the whole, despite a few imperfect moments. When called upon to reach an intense dramatic pitch without hysterics, Davis is capable of turning the trick. Yet there are moments in Dangerous when a lighter acting mood would be opportune."

Writing for The Spectator in 1936, Graham Greene characterized the story as "poor, [and] the ending atrociously sentimental". He criticized Margaret Lindsay's portrayal of Gail, and praised Bette Davis' Joyce, concluding that the film was "a picture to see for [Bette Davis'] sake"—"unusual, but only because of Miss Davis."

Australian film historian John Baxter wrote in 1979 that Davis’ performance "is an incomparable portrayal of human desolation moderating to hope and triumph...the peak of her performance is a brief scene, in which, to escape a storm, she and Francois Tone run to a barn stacked with bales of hay...the couple face each other in the damp, electrically charged air. Davis moves her arms in a gesture of seductive negligence, offers a mockingly companionable half-smile and we understand immediately the combination of sexual desire and malicious contempt for men that is both her mood at the moment and the key to her entire life.

"Epiphanies are rare in the cinema, and it is to Davis' genius alone that we owe this brief insight into the complexities of human behavior. Here is a talent beyond comparison, and nowhere is it more advantageous displayed than in her films of the Thirties."
