= Singapore Woman =

1941 film by Jean Negulesco

- Directed by: Jean Negulesco
- Screenplay by: M. Coates Webster and Allen Rivkin; Robert Presnell Sr. (uncredited)
- Based on: Hard Luck Dame by Laird Doyle (uncredited)
- Produced by: Bryan Foy (uncredited); Harlan Thompson (associate producer)
- Starring: Brenda Marshall; David Bruce; Virginia Field; Jerome Cowan; Rose Hobart
- Cinematography: Ted McCord, A.S.C.
- Edited by: Everett Dodd
- Music by: Adolph Deutsch
- Production company: Warner-Bros.—First National Pictures
- Distributed by: Warner Bros. Pictures
- Release date: May 17, 1941
- Running time: 64 minutes
- Country: United States
- Language: English

Singapore Woman is a 1941 American romantic drama film directed by Jean Negulesco and starring Brenda Marshall, David Bruce and Virginia Field. The Warner Bros. B picture is a remake of Dangerous (1935) using leftover sets from The Letter (1940). The story was based on Laird Doyle's short Hard Luck Dame. At one point both Ida Lupino and Jeffrey Lynn were attracted to the project and the latter received a suspension from the studio after refusing to do the role. Although Negulesco was the sole-credited director, he left the production and the film was completed by producer Harlan Thompson.

== Synopsis ==
Floating in the water, a copy of Singapore News newspaper is dated "Wednesday, September 10th, 1941". Troubled heiress Vicki Moore believes she has a jinx on her due to the curse hurled at her by the widow of a man she supposedly drove to suicide after playing with his emotions leading to the collapse soon afterwards of her own father's business. One night David Ritchie, a former associate of her father, encounters her drunk on gin in a waterfront bar. He takes her back to his rubber plantation and tries to give her a fresh start in life.

== Cast ==
- Brenda Marshall as Vicki Moore
- David Bruce as David Ritchie
- Virginia Field as Claire Weston
- Jerome Cowan as Jim North
- Rose Hobart as Alice North
- Heather Angel as Frieda
- Richard Ainley as John Wetherby
- Dorothy Tree as Mrs. Bennett
- Bruce Lester as Clyde
- Connie Leon as Suwa
- Douglas Walton as Roy Bennett
- Gilbert Emery as Sir Stanley Moore
- Stanley Logan as Commissioner
- Abner Biberman as Singa
- Eva Puig as Natasha

Uncredited

- Alexis Smith as Miss Oswald, North's Secretary
- Ian Wolfe as Sidney P. Melrose
- Leyland Hodgson as Sullivan, Mine Foreman
- Glen Cavender as Glen, Mine Foreman

== Critical reception ==
A review in trade magazine The Hollywood Reporter described it as "melodramatic to the point of narrowly escaping absurdity" and felt that "Negulesco's artistic pretensions are labored, and the histrionics he inspires, empty".

== Bibliography ==
- Capua, Michelangelo. Jean Negulesco: The Life and Films. McFarland 2017.
- Fetrow, Alan G. Feature Films, 1940-1949: a United States Filmography. McFarland, 1994.
