= Roy Chanslor =

American screenwriter (1899–1964)

- Born: August 25, 1899; Liberty, Missouri
- Died: April 16, 1964 (aged 64); Encino, California
- Occupations: Novelist; Screenwriter

Roy Chanslor (August 25, 1899 – April 16, 1964) was a novelist and screenwriter. Several of his works were filmed. Chanslor was born in Liberty, Missouri. He and his wife lived in Carmel, California. He died in Encino, California.

== Written works ==
- Johnny Guitar (1954)
- The Trouble With Paradise (1954)
- The Naked I (1953)
- The Ballad of Cat Ballou (1956)

== Filmography ==
- Front Page Woman (1935), co-writer
- The Vigilantes Return (1947), script
- Hazard (1948), novel and screenplay
- The Steel Key (1953), story
- Johnny Guitar (1954)
- Cat Ballou (1965)
