= The Northing Tramp =

1926 novel by Edgar Wallace

- Author: Edgar Wallace
- Language: English
- Genre: Crime
- Publication date: 1926
- Publication place: United Kingdom
- Media type: Print

The Northing Tramp is a 1926 crime novel by the British writer Edgar Wallace.

It was adapted for the film Strangers on Honeymoon (1936) directed by Albert de Courville.

== Bibliography ==
- Goble, Alan. The Complete Index to Literary Sources in Film. Walter de Gruyter, 1999.
