= Jimmy the Gent (film) =

1934 film by Michael Curtiz

- theatrical release poster
- Directed by: Michael Curtiz
- Screenplay by: Bertram Millhauser
- Story by: Ray Nazarro; Laird Doyle
- Produced by: Robert Lord
- Starring: James Cagney; Bette Davis
- Cinematography: Ira H. Morgan
- Edited by: Thomas Richards
- Music by: Bernhard Kaun
- Production company: Warner Bros. Pictures
- Distributed by: Warner Bros. Pictures
- Release date: March 17, 1934
- Running time: 67 minutes
- Country: United States
- Language: English

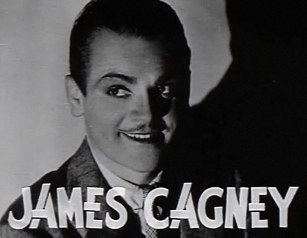
From the trailer

Jimmy the Gent is a 1934 American pre-Code comedy-crime film directed by Michael Curtiz, starring James Cagney and Bette Davis and featuring Allen Jenkins. It was the first pairing of Cagney and Davis, who would reunite for The Bride Came C.O.D. seven years later.

The screenplay by Bertram Millhauser was based on the story "The Heir Chaser" by Ray Nazarro and Laird Doyle.

== Plot ==
The unscrupulous Jimmy Corrigan runs an agency that searches for heirs of those who have died without leaving a will, and often provides phony claimants in order to collect his fee. When his former girlfriend Joan Martin, who left him because of his lack of ethics, accepts a position at the allegedly legitimate firm owned by Charles Wallingham, Corrigan investigates Wallingham's background and discovers his rival is even more crooked than he is. He exposes Wallingham as a phony and promises Joan to go straight if she will come back to him.

== Cast ==
- James Cagney as Jimmy Corrigan
- Bette Davis as Joan Martin
- Allen Jenkins as Lou
- Alan Dinehart as Charles Wallingham
- Alice White as Mabel
- Arthur Hohl as Monty Barton
- Phillip Reed as Ronnie Gateson
- Hobart Cavanaugh as fake Worthingham
- Mayo Methot as Gladys Farrell
- Ralf Harolde as Hendrickson
- Merna Kennedy as typist
- Nora Lane as Sarah Posy Barton

== Production ==
Prior to its release, the film's working titles were Blondes and Bonds and The Heir Chaser.

Both Cagney and Davis considered Jimmy the Gent to be a throwaway studio assembly-line quickie film, and neither was happy about the assignment. Cagney had the sides of his head shaved for the film, without the knowledge of either director Michael Curtiz or studio unit head Hal B. Wallis. Curtiz was stunned when he saw the haircut, and Wallis took it personally. Davis did not appreciate it either, and refused to have publicity pictures taken with Cagney.

== Reception ==
Jimmy the Gent did well at the box office, and the critical response was positive as well. In his review in The New York Times, Mordaunt Hall described the film as "a brisk, slangy piece of work in which Mr. Cagney is as much of a pepper-pot as ever ... [he] tackles the barbed argot of his lines with speed and force ... Bette Davis is attractive and capable as Joan." Variety said, "Jimmy the Gent ... [is] expert, thorough-going, typically Cagney ... and good for plenty of laughs."
