= Thomas Richards (film editor) =

American film editor (1899–1946)

- Born: January 8, 1899; Dalton, United Kingdom
- Died: January 4, 1946 (aged 46); Los Angeles, California, United States
- Occupation: Film editor
- Spouse: Glenda Farrell (m. 1921; div. 1929)
- Children: Tommy Farrell

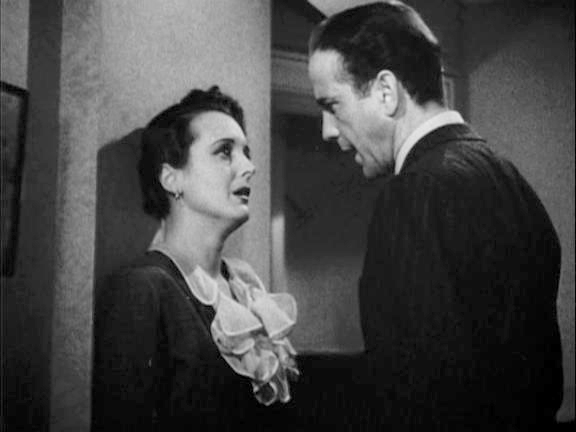
Frame from trailer for the Warner Bros. film The Maltese Falcon showing Humphrey Bogart as Spade confronting Mary Astor as Brigid.

Thomas Richards (8 January 1899 – 4 January 1946) was an American film editor.

His credits include The Maltese Falcon (1941), Each Dawn I Die (1939), Dangerous (1935) and The Seventh Cross (1944).

He was married to Glenda Farrell from 1921 to 1929, and the father of Tommy Farrell. He died in Los Angeles, California.

== Selected filmography ==
- Jimmy the Gent (1934)
- Dangerous (1935)
- Stage Struck (1936)
- Each Dawn I Die (1939)
- The Maltese Falcon (1941)
- Thumbs Up (1943)
- The Seventh Cross (1944)
