= Ray Enright =

American film director (1896–1965)

- Born: March 25, 1896; Anderson, Indiana
- Died: April 3, 1965 (aged 69); Hollywood, California
- Occupation: Film director
- Years active: 1927–1953

Ray Enright (March 25, 1896 – April 3, 1965) was an American film director and screenwriter who directed 73 films between 1927 and 1953, many of them for Warner Bros. He directed comedy films such as Joe E. Brown vehicles, five of the six informal pairings of Joan Blondell and Glenda Farrell and numerous Westerns, many featuring Randolph Scott.

Enright was born in Anderson, Indiana, and served in the U.S. Army Signal Corps in France during the World War I. Enright died in Hollywood, California, from a heart attack on April 3, 1965.

== Partial filmography ==
=== As director ===
- Tracked by the Police (1927)
- Jaws of Steel (1927)
- The Girl from Chicago (1927)
- Domestic Troubles (1928)
- Song of the West (1930)
- Golden Dawn (1930)
- Dancing Sweeties (1930)
- Scarlet Pages (1930)
- Play Girl (1932)
- Blondie Johnson (1933)
- Tomorrow at Seven (1933)
- Havana Widows (1933)
- I've Got Your Number (1934)
- Twenty Million Sweethearts (1934)
- The Circus Clown (1934)
- Dames (1934)
- The St. Louis Kid (1934)
- While the Patient Slept (1935)
- Traveling Saleslady (1935)
- Alibi Ike (1935)
- Miss Pacific Fleet (1935)
- We're in the Money (1935)
- Snowed Under (1936)
- Earthworm Tractors (1936)
- China Clipper (1936)
- Ready, Willing, and Able (1937)
- Slim (1937)
- The Singing Marine (1937)
- Swing Your Lady (1938)
- Gold Diggers in Paris (1938)
- Hard to Get (1938)
- Going Places (1938)
- The Angels Wash Their Faces (1939)
- On Your Toes (1939)
- Brother Rat and a Baby (1940)
- Teddy, the Rough Rider (1940 short)
- An Angel from Texas (1940)
- The Wagons Roll at Night (1941)
- Bad Men of Missouri (1941)
- Law of the Tropics (1941)
- Wild Bill Hickok Rides (1942)
- The Spoilers (1942)
- Sin Town (1942)
- Gung Ho! (1943)
- China Sky (1945)
- Man Alive (1945)
- One Way to Love (1946)
- Trail Street (1947)
- Albuquerque (1948)
- Coroner Creek (1948)
- Return of the Bad Men (1948)
- South of St. Louis (1949)
- Montana (1950)
- Kansas Raiders (1950)
- Flaming Feather (1952)
- The Man from Cairo (1953)

=== As screenwriter ===
- Gold Dust Gertie (1931)
- Side Show (1931)
- Local Boy Makes Good (1931)
- Fireman, Save My Child (1932)
