= Kansas City Princess =

1934 film by William Keighley

- Movie poster
- Directed by: William Keighley
- Written by: Sy Bartlett; Manuel Seff
- Produced by: Lou Edelman
- Starring: Joan Blondell; Glenda Farrell; Robert Armstrong; Hugh Herbert
- Cinematography: George Barnes
- Edited by: William Clemens
- Music by: Leo F. Forbstein
- Production company: Warner Bros.
- Distributed by: Warner Bros.
- Release date: October 13, 1934
- Running time: 64 minutes
- Country: United States
- Language: English

Kansas City Princess is a 1934 American comedy film starring Joan Blondell and Glenda Farrell. The film was directed by William Keighley with a script written by Sy Bartlett and Manuel Seff.

Warner Bros. Pictures sought to duplicate the success of Havana Widows (1933) by pairing Blondell and Farrell as a comedy duo of blonde bombshells; Kansas City Princess was the third film to feature this pairing. The film was released by Warner Bros. on October 13, 1934.

== Plot ==
Kansas City manicurist Rosie Sturges is in a relationship with minor gangster Dynamite Carson. Her friend and roommate Marie Callahan is a fellow manicurist seeking a rich husband. Marie dislikes Dynamite and urges Rosie to drop him. With Dynamite out of town, Marie prompts Rosie to take a date with customer Jimmy the Duke. However, the girls do not know that Jimmy is an associate of Dynamite, who is furious to learn that Marie has been dating behind his back.

Fearing Dynamite's anger, Rosie and Marie leave Kansas City by disguising themselves as members a girls' group to board a train to New York. With Dynamite in pursuit, the girls meet two businessmen in New York, Samuel Warren and Jim Cameron. After Dynamite corners them on a ship to Paris, the girls trick the two men into throwing their purses out the window to borrow money for their fares and new clothes. Dynamite becomes a bodyguard for millionaire Junior Ashcraft, who is sailing to Paris to confront his wife who he suspects has been having an affair with Dr. Sascha Pilnakoff.

When Rosie and Marie learn that Junior is on the ship, they pose as French manicurists to persuade him to give them the money to repay their debt, not knowing that Dynamite is his bodyguard. Dynamite exposes them to Junior and the girls become hysterical. Junior gives them the money and asks them to accompany him to Paris to meet with his private investigator Marcel.

In Paris, Junior, Dynamite and the girls meet with Marcel. Rosie poses as Dr. Sascha's lover to force Junior's wife to leave him and reconcile with Junior. However, Marcel double-crosses him and instead leads his wife to find Junior with Marie. Junior decides to get a divorce and marry Marie. Rosie also accepts Dynamite's marriage proposal, but only if he promises to leave the world of crime.

== Cast ==
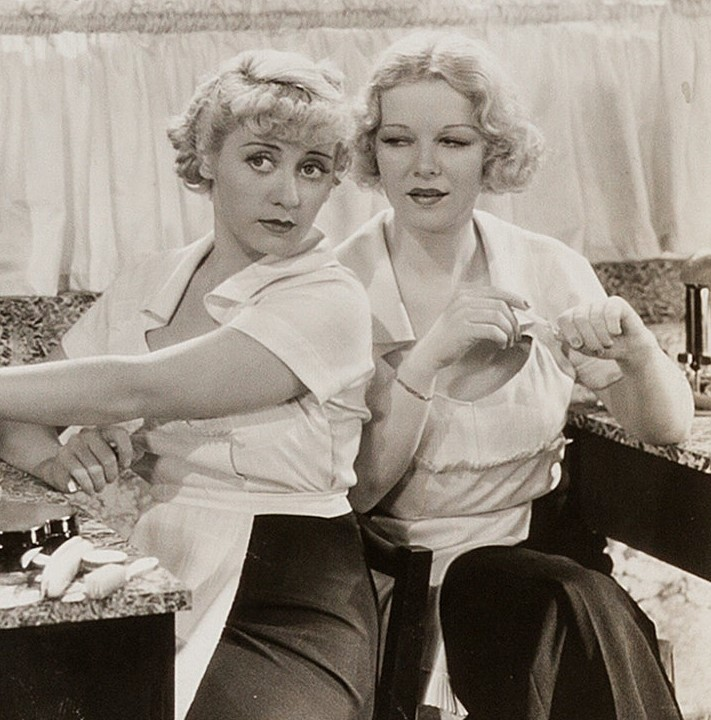
Blondell and Farrell in Kansas City Princess (1934)

- Joan Blondell as Rosie Sturges
- Glenda Farrell as Marie Callahan
- Robert Armstrong as Dynamite 'Dynie' Carson
- Hugh Herbert as Junior Ashcraft
- Osgood Perkins as Marcel Duryea
- T. Roy Barnes as Alderman James 'Jim' Cameron
- Hobart Cavanaugh as Alderman Sam Warren
- Gordon Westcott as Jimmy the Dude
- Vince Barnett as Quincy
- Ivan Lebedeff as Dr. Sascha Pilnakoff
- Renee Whitney as Mrs. Ashcraft
- Arthur Hoyt as Mr. Greenway

== Production ==
In production, the film was titled Princess of Kansas City. The film was completed three months before its release, but Warner Bros. delayed its release until after the birth of Joan Blondell's child to reduce the length of her interval between pictures.

== Reception ==
Andre Senwald of The New York Times wrote: "If you can imagine the Misses Blondell and Farrell as bogus girl Scouts you can imagine almost anything, a factor which should prove of considerable assistance at Kansas City Princess. In the athletic farce at the Roxy these racy girls, the screen's foremost professors in the study of the female acquisitive instinct, are demonstrating the merry art of getting something for nothing. Like most of the product which wears the Warner Brothers trade-mark, this one is fast and lively even when it isn't funny. Its principal misfortune is that its stock is shopworn. The cynical gold-digger has gone out of fashion lately, and the photoplay suffers the ills of obsolescence. The humor is improved by Hugh Herbert and Robert Armstrong, while Osgood Perkins is attractively loony as a treacherous French detective. But Kansas City Princess is muscular, loud and frantic, rather than impressively hilarious, and even for farce it never makes a great deal of sense."

== See also ==
- I've Got Your Number (1934)
- Traveling Saleslady (1935)
- We're in the Money (1935)
- Miss Pacific Fleet (1935)
