= Slightly Tempted =

Film directed by Lew Landers

- Theatrical release poster
- Directed by: Lew Landers
- Screenplay by: Arthur T. Horman
- Story by: Max Marcin; Manuel Seff
- Produced by: Ken Goldsmith
- Starring: Hugh Herbert; Peggy Moran; Johnny Downs; Elisabeth Risdon; George E. Stone; Gertrude Michael
- Cinematography: Charles Van Enger
- Edited by: Frank Gross
- Production company: Universal Pictures
- Distributed by: Universal Pictures
- Release date: October 18, 1940
- Running time: 60 minutes
- Country: United States
- Language: English

Slightly Tempted is a 1940 American comedy film directed by Lew Landers and written by Arthur T. Horman. The film stars Hugh Herbert, Peggy Moran, Johnny Downs, Elisabeth Risdon, George E. Stone and Gertrude Michael. The film was released on October 18, 1940, by Universal Pictures.

== Cast ==
- Hugh Herbert as Professor Ross
- Peggy Moran as Judy Ross
- Johnny Downs as Jimmy Duncan
- Elisabeth Risdon as Ethelreda Knox
- George E. Stone as Petey
- Gertrude Michael as Duchess
- Robert Emmett Keane as Gentleman Jack
- Harry C. Bradley as Cartwright
- Harry Holman as Mayor Ammerson
- Walter Soderling as Findiggle
- William Newell as Warcross
