= Miss Pacific Fleet =

1935 film by Ray Enright

- Movie poster
- Directed by: Ray Enright
- Screenplay by: Peter Milne; Lucille Newmark; Pat C. Flick
- Based on: Miss Pacific Fleet; 1934 story in Collier's by Frederick Hazlitt Brennan
- Produced by: Hal B. Wallis; Jack L. Warner
- Starring: Joan Blondell; Glenda Farrell; Hugh Herbert
- Cinematography: Arthur L. Todd
- Edited by: Clarence Kolster
- Music by: Leo F. Forbstein
- Distributed by: Warner Bros. Pictures
- Release date: December 14, 1935
- Running time: 66 min.
- Country: United States
- Language: English
- Budget: $202,798

Miss Pacific Fleet is a 1935 American comedy film directed by Ray Enright. The film stars Joan Blondell, Glenda Farrell, and Hugh Herbert. The film was based on the short story of the same name by Frederick Hazlitt Brennan in the Collier's magazine. It was released by Warner Bros. Pictures on December 14, 1935. Two stranded showgirls in California enter a beauty contest "Miss Pacific Fleet" to win the fare back home to New York City.

This is one of a series of five movies by Warner Bros. through the early 1930s, where Blondell and Farrell were paired as blonde bombshell comedy duo. The other films in the series are Havana Widows (1933), Kansas City Princess (1934), Traveling Saleslady (1935) and We're in the Money (1935). Four of the five movies were directed by Ray Enright. They also co-starred in other Warner Bros. films in Three on a Match (1932), I've Got Your Number (1934) and Gold Diggers of 1937 (1936).

== Plot ==
Gloria Fay and Mae O'Brien are two former showgirls working in an amusement park. Sailor Kewpie Wiggins is in love with Gloria, when he wins all their prizes with his skill at tossing rings, he learns that Gloria and Mae are broke. Kewpie suggests that Gloria enters the Miss Pacific Fleet contest to win the cash prize. Kewpie then offers to enter a boxing match in order to win 5000 votes for Gloria. He introduces Gloria and Mae to his friend Sgt.Tom Foster. Tom and Gloria fall in love.

During the boxing match, Kewpie is losing the match until he sees that Gloria and Tom are cuddling together in the audience. Angered, he knocks out his opponent and decides to give his 5000 votes to another contestant Virgie Matthews. However, Gloria is still slightly ahead in the contest. Sadie Freytag, who is married to August Freytag, the creator of the beauty contest, is jealous of Gloria and decides to kidnap her, so the prize will go to someone else instead. When Mae learns of her plans, she alerts Kewpie, who spots the kidnappers putting a woman in a small boat. Kewpie chases them to a ship where he frees the woman who ends up to be Sadie. At the last minute, Tom and Gloria arrive at contest headquarters with enough votes for her to win the contest. Gloria and Mae now have enough money to return home to New York.

== Cast ==
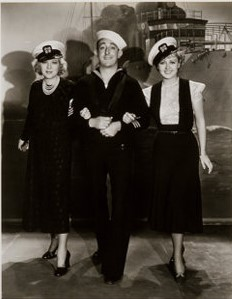
Glenda Farrell, Allen Jenkins and Joan Blondell in Miss Pacific Fleet (1935)

- Joan Blondell as Gloria Fay
- Glenda Farrell as Mae O'Brien
- Hugh Herbert as Mr. J. August Freytag
- Allen Jenkins as Bernard 'Kewpie' Wiggins
- Warren Hull as Sgt. Tom Foster
- Eddie Acuff as Clarence 'Dutch'
- Marie Wilson as Virginia 'Vergie' Matthews
- Minna Gombell as Sadie Freytag
- Guinn Williams as Nicholas 'Nick'

== Release ==
Miss Pacific Fleet was released in theatres on December 14, 1935. Warner Archive has released a double feature DVD collection of Miss Pacific Fleet (1935) and Traveling Saleslady (1935) on April 5, 2012.

== Reception ==
Frank S. Nugent of The New York Times writes in his review: "As unimportant as a corkscrew at a W. C. T. U. convention. Miss Pacific Fleet should not have been impeded in its headlong flight for second place on a double-feature bill. Being placed alone on the Roxy's screen imposes too great a strain upon the picture and the audience, even conceding that the Roxy's faithful are ever anxious to absorb large doses of nautical comedy. This one has a complicated genealogy. The story is credited to Frederick Hazlitt Brennan; the screen play stems from Lucille Newmark and Peter Milne; there is additional dialogue by one Patsy Flick. From these no less than mountainous labors comes a mousey little photoplay about two stranded chorus girls whose only hope of getting their fare back to Broadway is by winning a popularity contest with the votes of the enlisted men of the Pacific Fleet. Joan Blondell and Glenda Farrell, upon whose comic talents the Warners are placing too much emphasis, are the girls; Allen Jenkins is Kewpie Wiggins, their lobbyist in the fleet; Hugh Herbert is August Freytag, president of the Better Business Bureau sponsoring the contest. There is an allegedly humorous prizefight; there is a kidnapping; there is a comedy chase. What more can one expect of a sub-Class B picture? If the first half of the film is endurable, credit it to Mr. Herbert. If the second half is a bore, debit the Warners' recourse to the Old Familiars of Picture-Making. What Miss Pacific Fleet needs is rearmament in all departments.
