= The Perfect Specimen =

1937 film by Michael Curtiz

- Film poster
- Directed by: Michael Curtiz
- Written by: Norman Reilly Raine; Lawrence Riley; Brewster Morse; Fritz Falkenstein; Story: Samuel Hopkins Adams
- Starring: Errol Flynn; Joan Blondell
- Cinematography: Charles Rosher
- Edited by: Terry O. Morse
- Music by: Heinz Roemheld
- Distributed by: Warner Bros. Pictures
- Release date: October 23, 1937 (U.S.)
- Running time: 97 minutes
- Country: United States
- Language: English
- Budget: $505,000
- Box office: $1,281,000

The Perfect Specimen is a 1937 American romantic comedy film directed by Michael Curtiz and starring Errol Flynn and Joan Blondell. The picture is based on a novel by Samuel Hopkins Adams.

It was Flynn's first comedy.

== Plot ==
Gerald Wicks, the heir to a large fortune, has never been outside the gates of his childhood estate. He goes on an adventure with newspaper reporter Mona Carter and they fall in love.

== Cast ==
- Errol Flynn as Gerald Beresford Wicks
- Joan Blondell as Mona Carter
- Hugh Herbert as Killigrew Shaw
- Edward Everett Horton as Mr. Gratten
- Dick Foran as Jink Carter
- Beverly Roberts as Alicia
- May Robson as Mrs. Leona Wicks
- Allen Jenkins as Pinky
- Dennie Moore as Clarabelle
- Hugh O'Connell as Hotel clerk
- James Burke as Snodgrass
- Granville Bates as Hooker

== Original novel ==
The Perfect Specimen
- Author: Samuel Hopkins
- Language: English
- Genre: Comedy
- Publisher: New York Liveright Publishing Corporation
- Publication date: 1936
- Pages: 224

The book was based on a novel. The New York Times called it "a trifling little number. It reads like one of those old fashioned farce comedies... hammock reading for a hot afternoon."

== Production ==
The film was Flynn's first comedy starring role and the movie always seems to have been considered a vehicle for him. He made it after holidaying in Europe.

Warners originally sought Carole Lombard or Miriam Hopkins to play against Errol Flynn and for a while it seemed Hopkins was set to co-star. However she turned down the role and Warners decided to look at players assigned to their contract roster. The two leading contenders were Olivia de Havilland and Joan Blondell; it was thought the former was ideal if the role was played in a "romantic" way but the latter should be preferred it they wanted someone "pepful and sparkling". Blondell was cast and filming started in May 1937.

Marie Wilson was meant to play a small role but was assigned to The Great Garrick instead. Dennie Moore replaced Jane Wyman.

Joan Blondell fell ill during filming but recovered.

== Reception ==
The New York Times called the film a "light and unaffecting romantic comedy."

May Robson's performance was highly praised in particular.

=== Box Office ===
According to Warner Bros records the film earned $786,000 domestically and $495,000 foreign.
