= Fog Over Frisco =

1934 film by William Dieterle

- Theatrical release poster
- Directed by: William Dieterle
- Written by: George Dyer (novel); Robert N. Lee; Eugene Solow
- Based on: The Five Fragments; 1932 novel by George Dyer
- Produced by: Henry Blanke (uncredited); Robert Lord (uncredited)
- Starring: Bette Davis; Donald Woods; Margaret Lindsay; Lyle Talbot; Hugh Herbert; Irving Pichel; Alan Hale; William Demarest
- Cinematography: Tony Gaudio
- Edited by: Harold McLernon
- Music by: Leo F. Forbstein (music supervision)
- Distributed by: Warner Bros.-First National Pictures
- Release date: June 2, 1934
- Running time: 68 min
- Country: USA
- Language: English

Fog Over Frisco is a 1934 American pre-Code drama film directed by William Dieterle. The screenplay by Robert N. Lee and Eugene Solow was based on the 1932 mystery novel The Five Fragments by George Dyer.

== Plot ==
Arlene Bradford is a spoiled, bored, wealthy socialite who finances her extravagant lifestyle by exploiting her fiancé Spencer Carlton's access to her stepfather's brokerage firm and using her connection to steal security bonds for crime boss Jake Bello.

When Arlene disappears, her step-sister Val steps in to discover what happened to her with the help of society reporter Tony Sterling and photojournalist Izzy Wright.

== Cast ==
- Bette Davis as Arlene Bradford
- Donald Woods as Tony Sterling
- Margaret Lindsay as Val Bradford
- Hugh Herbert as Izzy Wright
- Lyle Talbot as Spencer Carlton
- Irving Pichel as Jake Bello
- Alan Hale as Chief C.B. O'Malley
- William Demarest as Spike Smith
- Arthur Byron as Everett Bradford
- George Chandler as Taxi Driver
- Skippy as Ragsy

== Background ==
Bette Davis, anxious to portray the slatternly waitress Mildred in the RKO Radio Pictures production Of Human Bondage, accepted the relatively small role of Arlene in the hope her cooperation would convince Jack L. Warner to lend her to the rival studio for the film. Her ploy worked, and when Warner received word about her dynamic performance in Bondage, he elevated her to top billing in Frisco.

Part of the Warner Brothers release was filmed on location in San Francisco. It was remade as Spy Ship in 1942.

It was released on DVD in July 2010.

== Critical reception ==
In his review in The New York Times, Mordaunt Hall described the film as a "ruddy thriller" and wrote "What [it] lacks in the matter of credibility, it atones for partly by its breathless pace and its abundance of action. As the story of murder and robbery passes on the screen it scarcely gives the spectator time to think who might be the ring-leader of the band of desperadoes."

Time stated "Brisk to the point of confession, Fog Over Frisco is not the best of Director William Dieterle's pictures."

Film historian William K. Everson called it "the fastest film ever made".
