= Clarence Kolster =

American film editor (1895–1972)

- Born: September 6, 1895; Plattsburgh, New York, United States
- Died: May 6, 1972 (aged 76); Santa Monica, California, United States
- Occupation: Film editor
- Years active: 1922–1958

Clarence Kolster (September 6, 1895 – May 6, 1972) was an American film editor, active during the later years of the silent era, right through the 1950s.

== Biography ==
Born in Plattsburgh, New York, in 1895, Clarence began his film career editing the 1922 silent film Rags to Riches. During his 30-year career, he would edit almost 100 films, in addition to working as assistant director on the 1924 film The Lighthouse by the Sea. His career would include such classics as The Painted Desert, also in 1931, which featured Clark Gable's first speaking role; the 1946 remake of Of Human Bondage; Always Leave Them Laughing, starring Milton Berle and Virginia Mayo; and 1958's Our Miss Brooks starring Eve Arden.

But Kolster's crowning achievement was his first mega-hit, the 1931 version of Frankenstein, starring Boris Karloff. Kolster's editing of when the monster is revealed has been called, "... possibly the most distinguished piece of cutting in all of horror movie history." In addition, the creation sequence, the monster finding the small child by the lake, and the confrontation between the monster and Frankenstein's bride, have all become iconic scenes in film history, often imitated and parodied in later pictures.

In 1958, Kolster would make the switch from the big screen to the small screen, where he worked on several television series, including Maverick and 77 Sunset Strip. Kolster retired in 1962, and would die 10 years later.

== Filmography ==
(as per AFI's database)

Year	Title	Role	Notes
1922	Rags to Riches	Editor	
1923	The Country Kid	Editor	
1923	Little Johnny Jones	Editor	
1923	The Printer's Devil	Editor	
1924	Conductor 1492	Editor	
1924	The Lighthouse by the Sea	Assistant director	
1925	Three Weeks in Paris	Editor	
1925	Hogan's Alley	Editor	
1925	The Clash of the Wolves	Editor	
1925	On Thin Ice	Editor	
1926	The Fighting Edge	Editor	
1926	The Little Irish Girl	Editor	
1926	Broken Hearts of Hollywood	Editor	
1926	His Jazz Bride	Editor	
1926	The Night Cry	Editor	
1926	The Sap	Editor	
1926	The Third Degree	Editor	
1927	The College Widow	Editor	
1927	A Dog of the Regiment	Editor	
1927	Ginsberg the Great	Editor	
1927	Husbands for Rent	Editor	
1930	Sunny Skies	Editor	
1930	Hot Curves	Editor	
1930	Peacock Alley	Editor	
1930	The Thoroughbred	Editor	
1930	Troopers Three	Editor	
1930	Wings of Adventure	Editor	
1931	Frankenstein	Editor	
1931	The Painted Desert	Editor	
1931	Waterloo Bridge	Editor	
1932	The Old Dark House	Editor	
1932	The Impatient Maiden	Editor	
1932	Doomed Battalion	Editor	
1933	King of the Wild Horses	Editor	
1933	Havana Widows	Editor	
1933	The Fighting Code	Editor	
1933	Unknown Valley	Editor	
1934	Twenty Million Sweethearts	Editor	
1934	Circus Clown	Editor	
1934	The St. Louis Kid	Editor	
1934	I've Got Your Number	Editor	
1935	The White Cockatoo	Editor	
1935	Special Agent	Editor	
1935	Mary Jane's Pa	Editor	
1935	Miss Pacific Fleet	Editor	
1936	Brides Are Like That	Editor	
1936	Polo Joe	Editor	
1936	Hot Money	Editor	
1936	The Law in Her Hands	Editor	
1937	Her Husband's Secretary	Editor	
1937	Back in Circulation	Editor	
1937	Empty Holsters	Editor	
1937	Once a Doctor	Editor	
1937	Sh! The Octopus	Editor	
1938	Gold Is Where You Find It	Editor	
1938	Four's a Crowd	Editor	
1938	Going Places	Editor	
1939	Hell's Kitchen	Editor	
1939	On Your Toes	Editor	
1940	River's End	Editor	
1940	South of Suez	Editor	
1940	An Angel from Texas	Editor	
1940	Brother Rat and a Baby	Editor	
1941	Bad Men of Missouri	Editor	
1941	Thieves Fall Out	Editor	
1942	Men of Texas	Editor	
1942	The Spoilers	Editor	
1942	Wild Bill Hickok Rides	Editor	
1943	The Mysterious Doctor	Editor	
1943	Truck Busters	Editor	
1943	Adventure in Iraq	Editor	
1944	Make Your Own Bed	Editor	
1946	Of Human Bondage	Editor	
1947	Escape Me Never	Editor	
1948	Smart Girls Don't Talk	Editor	
1948	The Woman in White	Editor	
1949	Always Leave Them Laughing	Editor	
1949	South of St. Louis	Editor	
1950	Barricade	Editor	
1950	Dallas	Editor	
1951	Close to My Heart	Editor	
1951	Fort Worth	Editor	
1951	Sugarfoot	Editor	
1951	Storm Warning	Editor	
1952	The Big Trees	Editor	
1952	Operation Secret	Editor	
1952	She's Working Her Way Through College	Editor	
1953	South Sea Woman	Editor	
1953	The System	Editor	
1954	The Bounty Hunter	Editor	
1954	Drum Beat	Editor	
1955	I Died a Thousand Times	Editor	
1955	Target Zero	Editor	
1956	Our Miss Brooks	Editor	
1956	Zarak	Editor	
1956	The Burning Hills	Editor	
1956	The Lone Ranger	Editor	
1957	Shoot-Out at Medicine Bend	Editor	
1958	Fort Dobbs	Editor	
