= Merry Wives of Reno =

- Theatrical release poster
- Directed by: H. Bruce Humberstone
- Written by: Joe Traub (additional dialogue); Wilson Mizner (uncredited)
- Screenplay by: Robert Lord
- Story by: Robert Lord
- Produced by: Sam Bischoff
- Starring: Guy Kibbee; Glenda Farrell; Donald Woods; Margaret Lindsay; Hugh Herbert; Frank McHugh; Ruth Donnelly
- Cinematography: Ernest Haller
- Edited by: Thomas Pratt
- Music by: Heinz Roemheld (uncredited)
- Production company: Warner Bros. Pictures
- Distributed by: Warner Bros. Pictures
- Release date: May 12, 1934
- Running time: 64 minutes
- Country: United States
- Language: English
- Budget: $101,000
- Box office: $323,000

Merry Wives of Reno is a 1934 American pre-Code comedy film directed by H. Bruce Humberstone and starring Guy Kibbee, Glenda Farrell, Donald Woods, Margaret Lindsay, Hugh Herbert, Frank McHugh and Ruth Donnelly. The film was released by Warner Bros. Pictures on May 12, 1934.

The plot and cast number are similar to the lost 1933 film Convention City. Robert Lord was a writer in both films, though this one is not nearly as risque and racy.

== Plot ==
Madge and Lois take the train from New York City to Reno, NV to get quickie divorces from their husbands.

== Cast ==
- Guy Kibbee as Tom
- Glenda Farrell as Bunny
- Donald Woods as Frank
- Margaret Lindsay as Madge
- Hugh Herbert as Colonel Fitch
- Frank McHugh as Al
- Ruth Donnelly as Lois
- Roscoe Ates as The Trapper (as Rosco Ates)
- Hobart Cavanaugh as Derwent

== Box office ==
According to Warner Bros records the film earned $220,000 domestically and $103,000 internationally.
