= We're in the Money (1935 film) =

1935 film by Ray Enright

- Film poster
- Directed by: Ray Enright
- Screenplay by: F. Hugh Herbert; Brown Holmes
- Story by: George Bilson
- Starring: Joan Blondell; Glenda Farrell
- Cinematography: Arthur L. Todd
- Edited by: Owen Marks
- Music by: Heinz Roemheld; Leo F. Forbstein
- Distributed by: Warner Bros. Pictures
- Release date: August 17, 1935
- Running time: 66 minutes
- Country: United States
- Language: English

We're in the Money is a 1935 American romantic comedy film directed by Ray Enright. It was released by Warner Bros. Pictures on August 17, 1935. The film stars Joan Blondell and Glenda Farrell and is one of five Warner Bros. films in which they were paired as blonde bombshell comedy duo. The other films include Havana Widows (1933), Kansas City Princess (1934), Traveling Saleslady (1935) and Miss Pacific Fleet (1935). Ginger and Dixie are two process servers, who serve legal papers to a playboy, a racketeer, a wrestler and a singer.

== Plot ==
Ginger Stewart and Dixie Tilton are offered $1000 by ditsy lawyer Homer Bronson to serve subpoenas on reluctant witnesses for a breach of promise lawsuit brought by Claire LeClaire against wealthy C. Richard Courtney. They have a deadline: A new state law will take effect in a few weeks banning such suits. Unbeknownst to Ginger, she already knows the defendant; she and Courtney, masquerading as a chauffeur named Carter, have fallen in love. Courtney himself does not know that Ginger is a process server.

Through trickery, Ginger and Dixie manage to serve papers on three of their wary targets: nightclub singer Phil Logan, gangster 'Butch' Gonzola, and professional wrestler Man Mountain Dean, the last in the middle of a bout with Chief Pontiac. Courtney, on the advice of his lawyer, Stephen Dinsmore, prepares to sail away to safety on his yacht. However, Ginger jumps out of a motorboat piloted by the erratic Bronson and pretends to be in distress. She is rescued by Courtney's crewmen. She and Courtney finally learn each other's true identity, but eventually admit they love each other and decide to get married. Ginger sends a message to Dixie, asking her to bring a few things she will need for the honeymoon. However, Dixie assumes her partner is merely luring Courtney in, and when the couple set foot on the dock, Dixie serves the last subpoena. Courtney also assumes Ginger was merely acting and angrily breaks up with her.

At the trial, Bronson produces a photograph showing LeClaire cosily nestled in Courtney's lap. Courtney agrees to marry LeClaire. Later, however, Bronson confides to Ginger and Dixie that he faked the picture by combining two others. Ginger rushes over and stops the wedding ceremony just in time. She and Courtney then reconcile.

== Cast ==
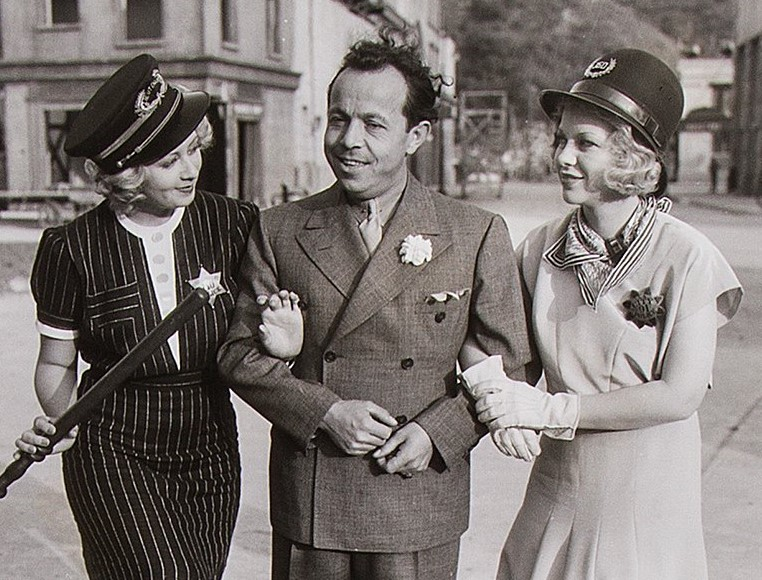
Blondell and Farrell on the set of We're in the Money (1935)

- Joan Blondell as Ginger Stewart
- Glenda Farrell as Dixie Tilton
- Hugh Herbert as Lawyer Homer Bronson
- Ross Alexander as C. Richard Courtney
- Hobart Cavanaugh as Max
- Phil Regan as Singer Phil Logan
- Anita Kerry as Claire LeClaire
- Henry O'Neill as Lawyer Stephen 'Dinsy' Dinsmore

== Songs ==
- "We're in the Money" – music and lyrics by Al Dubin and Harry Warren. Background and sometimes hummed by the cast.
- "It's So Nice Seeing You Again" – music and lyrics by Allie Wrubel and Mort Dixon. Sung by Phil Regan in the nightclub scene.
