= A Night for Crime =

1943 film

- Movie poster
- Directed by: Alexis Thurn-Taxis
- Written by: Sherman L. Lowe; Arthur St. Claire
- Based on: A Beautiful Night for Love by Jimmy Starr
- Produced by: Lester Cutler
- Starring: Glenda Farrell; Lyle Talbot
- Cinematography: Marcel Le Picard
- Edited by: Frederick Bain
- Music by: Leo Erdody
- Production company: Producers Releasing Corporation
- Release date: February 18, 1943
- Running time: 68 minutes
- Country: United States
- Language: English

A Night for Crime is a 1943 American Mystery film starring Glenda Farrell and Lyle Talbot. The film is directed by Alexis Thurn-Taxis and was released by Producers Releasing Corporation on February 18, 1943. Murders in a Hollywood film studio baffle a reporter and a PR man.

== Plot ==
Joe Powell a publicity director for a film studio visits his girlfriend Susan Cooper. When they hear a woman scream, they find out that Ellen Smith who lives across the hall has been strangled to death in her apartment. Later, an actress named Mona Harrison who recently disappeared makes newspaper headlines. Police chief Williams interviews all the people who were at her home for a dinner party the night before, where after Mona's servants quit she offered to take everyone out for dinner, but never showed up at the restaurant. Susan decides to search Mona's bedroom and finds a safe. She hides in the closet when a man enters the room. She is nearly strangled to death until detective Hoffman enters the room and the assailant escapes.

Joe and Susan later learn that Mona has been found dead, and the coroner determines that although Ellen was murdered by a man, Mona was killed by a woman. Joe is later nearly killed by an unseen assailant as he checks his office files for Mona's twin sister Marie. Susan decides to leave for Reno, Nevada. Concerned about Susan's safety, Joe, Hamilton Hart, and Carol Lynn head for Reno. Meanwhile, Susan is nearly driven off the road by Arthur Evans. When Susan goes to the hotel she meets Joe, Carol, Hart, and also Mona's sister Marie. Susan reveals that Arthur was married to Marie and they were blackmailing Mona. When Mona refused to pay more money, Marie killed her and Arthur killed Ellen who was a witness to Mona's murder. Marie becomes violent and in her fury, she accidentally falls to her death from the hotel window.

== Cast ==
- Glenda Farrell as Susan Cooper
- Lyle Talbot as Joe Powell
- Ralph Sanford as Det. Hoffman
- Lina Basquette as Mona Harrison
- Lynn Starr as Carol Lynn
- Donald Kirke as Hamilton Hart
- Forrest Taylor as Chief of Police Williams
- Rick Vallin as Arthur Evans

== Home media ==
A Night for Crime was released on DVD in September 13, 2016.
