= Blondie Johnson =

1933 film

- Theatrical poster
- Directed by: Ray Enright
- Written by: Earl Baldwin
- Starring: Joan Blondell; Chester Morris
- Cinematography: Tony Gaudio
- Edited by: George Marks
- Music by: Leo F. Forbstein
- Production company: First National Pictures
- Distributed by: Warner Bros. Pictures
- Release date: February 25, 1933
- Running time: 67 minutes
- Country: United States
- Language: English

Blondie Johnson is a 1933 American pre-Code gangster film directed by Ray Enright and starring Joan Blondell and Chester Morris. It was produced by First National Pictures with distribution by Warner Bros. Pictures.

== Plot ==
Set during the Great Depression, Blondie Johnson quits her job after her boss sexually harasses her. She and her sick mother are then evicted from their apartment and are unable to get any government relief funds. After her mother dies, Blondie is determined to become rich. She soon gets involved in a criminal organization and falls in love with Danny, one of its members. Later she convinces him to take down his boss. Blondie eventually climbs up the criminal ladder, becoming boss to the "little navy" gang before the gang is exposed. Blondie is convicted and sent to prison for six years, but she and Danny promise each other that they will make a fresh start after paying their debts to society.

== Cast ==
- Joan Blondell as Blondie Johnson
- Chester Morris as Danny
- Allen Jenkins as Louis
- Earle Foxe as Scannel
- Claire Dodd as Gladys
- Mae Busch as Mae
- Toshia Mori as Lulu
- Joseph Cawthorn as Manager
- Olin Howland as Eddie
- Sterling Holloway as Red
- Charles Lane as Cashier (uncredited)
- Sam McDaniel as Train Porter

== Preservation status ==
- A print is preserved in the Library of Congress-Packard Campus for Audio-Visual Conservation collection.
