= High Tension (1936 film) =

1936 film by Allan Dwan

- Movie poster
- Directed by: Allan Dwan
- Written by: Lou Breslow; Edward Eliscu; John Patrick
- Produced by: Sol M. Wurtzel
- Starring: Brian Donlevy; Glenda Farrell; Norman Foster
- Cinematography: Barney McGill
- Edited by: Louis R. Loeffler
- Production company: 20th Century Fox
- Distributed by: 20th Century Fox
- Release date: July 17, 1936
- Running time: 63 minutes
- Country: United States
- Language: English

High Tension is a 1936 American comedy drama film directed by Allan Dwan and starring Brian Donlevy, Glenda Farrell, and Norman Foster. It was released by 20th Century Fox on July 17, 1936. The film was based on the story written by J. Robert Bren and Norman Houston.

== Plot ==
Cable layer Steve Reardon is in a tank at the bottom of the ocean near Hawaii reading an adventure story written by his girlfriend Edith McNeil, who bases her stories on Steve's life. After repairing the cable he was sent to fix, Steve returns to San Francisco and asks his boss Willard Stone for a $1000 bonus and two weeks' vacation so that he can marry Edith. Later, Steve and Edith have an argument after he arrives hours late for their date and complains that she is taking too long to get dressed. Steve storms out. At a bar, he meets piano player Eddie Mitchell and gets into a fight and is knocked unconscious. The next day, Steve wakes up in Eddie's apartment. When Steve learns that Eddie studied engineering in college, he offers to help his new friend become a real engineer.

One year later, Eddie has become an engineer and he and Steve return to San Francisco from their latest expedition. Steve buys an engagement ring for Edith, whom he has not seen since their argument. When Steve arrives at her apartment and finds her with the heavyweight boxing champion, Terry Madden, the subject of her new stories, he gets into a fight with Terry. Steve is arrested and Edith bails him out of jail. They agree to marry if Steve can prove he is dependable for six months. Steve transfers to an office job at the company, while Eddie has the position as superintendent of the Honolulu station. In Honolulu, Eddie encounters hostility from chief engineer Noble Harrison, who believes that he should have gotten Eddie's job. When Noble informs the head office that Eddie plans to correct a shifting coral formation that threatens to wreck their frayed cable by blasting; Steve convinces the head office to head him to Honolulu to help Eddie. When he tells Edith about the transfer and reveals that he agreed to stay in Hawaii for one year, she angrily ends their engagement.

In Honolulu, Steve fires Noble and begins to flirt with Brenda Burke, Eddie's secretary. Brenda, who has tried to go out with Eddie to no avail, accepts Steve's flirtation. When Steve spontaneously sends a picture of himself with Brenda in a bathing suit to Edith, she is furious and goes to Hawaii to return his engagement ring in person. Eddie warns Steve not to play with Brenda's feelings, and Steve realizes that Eddie is in love with Brenda. Later, Steve meets up with Edith. They spend the evening together and reconcile. When Steve fails to show up for a 6 a.m. blast, Eddie, trying to impress Brenda, decides to go ahead with the blast without him. After Eddie dives into the coral, his air line is blocked. Steve arrives and rescues Eddie as Brenda and Edith watch on shore. Afterwards, Brenda and Eddie embrace, and a telegraph arrives from the head office saying that if Steve marries Edith, he will get a five-year contract and she will have permission to travel with him to get firsthand material for her stories.

== Cast ==
- Brian Donlevy as Steve Reardon
- Glenda Farrell as Edith McNeil
- Norman Foster as Eddie Mitchell
- Helen Wood as Brenda Burke
- Robert McWade as Willard Stone
- Theodore von Eltz as Noble Harrison
- Hattie McDaniel as Hattie
- Romaine Callender as F. Willoughby Tuttle
- Joe Sawyer as Terry Madden
- George Chandler as Man at Honolulu Dock

== Production ==
The original title for the story by J. Robert Bren and Norman Houston was "Here Comes Trouble", but 20th Century Fox used that title for another film which they released earlier in the same year. The working title of the movie was "Trouble Makers". The film includes the song "And That Woman Made a Monkey Out of Me" by Sidney Clare.

== Reception ==
The New York Times movie review said: "High Tension is a loud and funny comedy written almost entirely in the vernacular, which is well suited to Miss Glenda Farrell's aptitude for robust comedy. Here she is aided and abetted by Brian Donlevy, the man with the profile, who spends part of his time asking her to marry him and, paradoxically, running out on her after she consents. Apparently for good measure, the scenario writers toss in some melodramatic episodes. For instance, the interlude in which Mr. Donlevy descends to the floor of the Pacific to rescue Norman Foster, who becomes entangled in a movement of coral reef while mending the Honolulu—San Francisco cable. High Tension may be recommended to the not too finicky as better than average hot-weather screen fare."

== Home media ==
20th Century Fox released the film on DVD on December 16, 2014.
