= An Angel from Texas =

1940 film by Ray Enright

- Directed by: Ray Enright
- Screenplay by: Fred Niblo Jr. Bertram Millhauser
- Based on: The Butter and Egg Man; 1925 play by George S. Kaufman
- Produced by: Robert Fellows
- Starring: Eddie Albert; Rosemary Lane; Wayne Morris; Ronald Reagan; Jane Wyman
- Cinematography: Arthur L. Todd
- Edited by: Clarence Kolster
- Music by: Howard Jackson
- Production company: Warner Bros. Pictures
- Distributed by: Warner Bros. Pictures
- Release date: April 27, 1940
- Running time: 69 minutes
- Country: United States
- Language: English

An Angel from Texas is a 1940 comedy film directed by Ray Enright and written by Fred Niblo Jr. and Bertram Millhauser, based on the hit 1925 play The Butter and Egg Man written by George S. Kaufman. The film stars Eddie Albert, Rosemary Lane, Wayne Morris, Ronald Reagan and Jane Wyman. It was released by Warner Bros. Pictures on April 27, 1940.

== Plot ==
Peter "Tex" Coleman, a dairy farmer from Texas, comes to New York with his mother's life savings to buy a hotel and be near his stagestruck sweetheart Lydia Weston. Upon his arrival, Tex finds that Lydia is not the stage star that her hometown thinks that she has become. Instead, she is working as a secretary for fast-talking producers Mac McClure and Marty Allen.

Mac and Marty have a play set for rehearsal but no money to produce it, and their leading lady Valerie Blayne is threatening reprisals by her gangster boyfriend Pooch Davis if the show does not open on schedule. Tex agrees to invest his money in the show if Lydia is given the lead, and when Mac and Marty consent to his terms, the play goes into rehearsal as a drama with two leading ladies.

When Valerie threatens Mac with bodily harm if she is not permitted to play the lead, Mac informs Tex that he will fire Lydia unless Tex buys the entire show. Sensing that the play could work as a farce, Marty's wife Marge offers the money on the condition that Tex play the male lead.

On opening night, the audience laughs uproariously as dynamite planted on stage by Valerie's vindictive boyfriend explodes, and the actors' performances are so bad that they are funny. As a comedy, the show becomes a smash success, but when a plagiarism suit is brought, Tex and Marge sell the show back to its eager producers and leave them holding the bag.

== Cast ==
- Eddie Albert as Peter
- Rosemary Lane as Lydia
- Wayne Morris as Mac
- Ronald Reagan as Marty
- Jane Wyman as Marge
- Ruth Terry as Valerie Blayne
- John Litel as Quigley
- Hobart Cavanaugh as Mr. Robelink
- Ann Shoemaker as Addie Lou Coleman
- Tom Kennedy as Chopper
- Milburn Stone as 'Pooch' Davis

== Reception ==
In a contemporary review for The New York Times, critic Thomas M. Pryor wrote: "The story is neither new nor exciting, and, except for the addition of some modern slang, is pretty much the same as when George S. Kaufman told it in 1925 via 'The Butter and Egg Man.' It has been smartly acted by a pleasant company, especially by Eddie Albert, Wayne Morris, Ronald Reagan and Jane Wyman. Ray Enright has directed in a breezy, farcical manner."
