= Hi Nellie! =

1934 film by Mervyn LeRoy

Hi, Nellie!
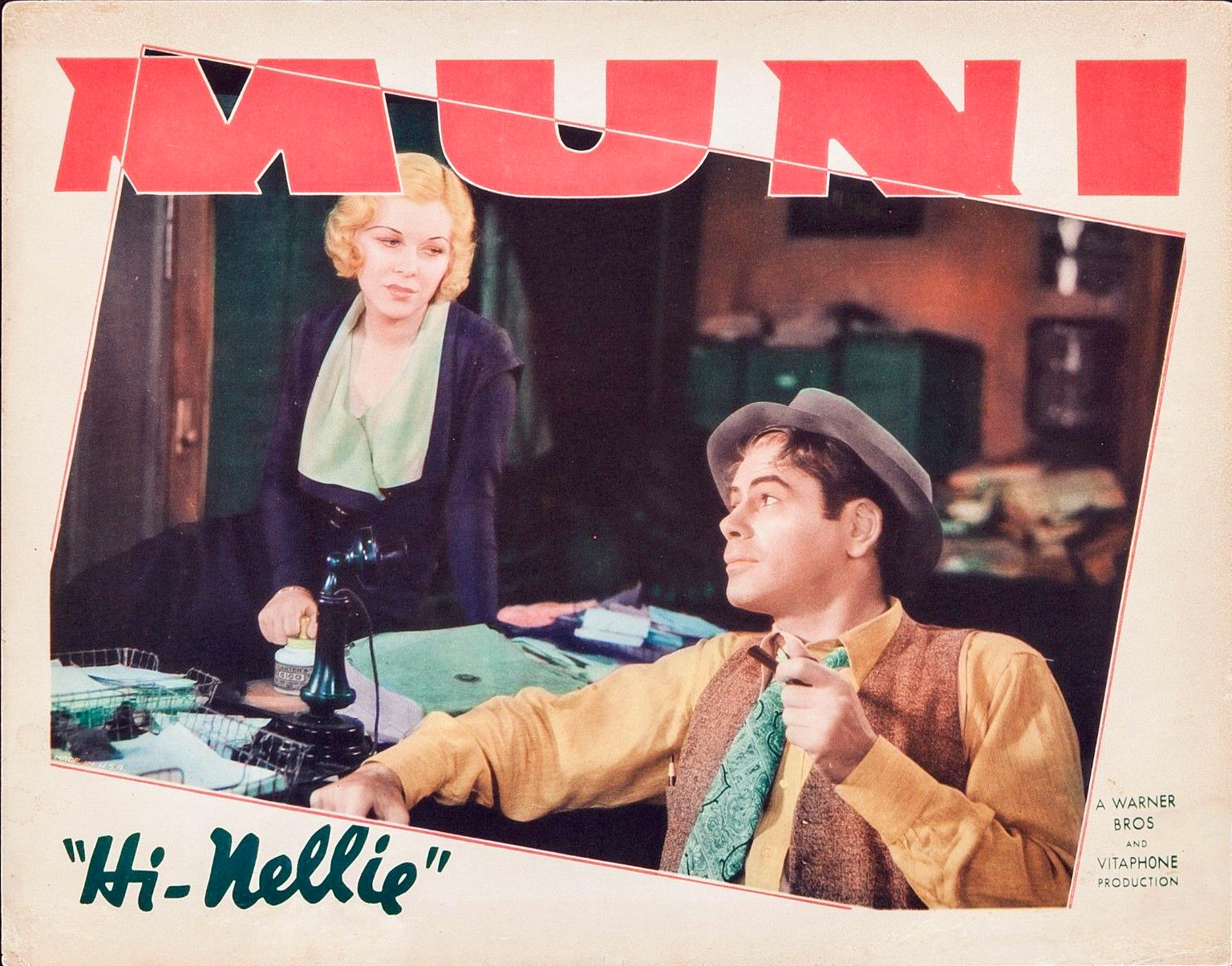
- Lobby card
- Directed by: Mervyn LeRoy
- Written by: Abem Finkel; Sidney Sutherland
- Story by: Roy Chanslor
- Produced by: Robert Presnell Sr.
- Starring: Paul Muni; Glenda Farrell
- Cinematography: Sol Polito
- Edited by: William Holmes
- Music by: Bernhard Kaun
- Production company: Warner Bros. Pictures
- Distributed by: Warner Bros. Pictures
- Release date: January 20, 1934
- Running time: 75 minutes
- Country: United States
- Language: English
- Budget: $223,000
- Box office: $647,000

Hi, Nellie! is a 1934 American pre-Code crime drama film directed by Mervyn LeRoy and starring Paul Muni and Glenda Farrell. A newspaper editor is demoted to writing an advice column for refusing to go along with the crowd in declaring a missing lawyer to be a thief.

== Plot ==
Newspaper editor Brad learns that Frank J. Canfield, the head of the governor's investigating committee, has disappeared, along with a large sum of money. He refuses to print the story on the front page of the newspaper because there is no proof that Canfield, an honest and prominent lawyer, fled with the missing funds. When every other newspaper in the city features the story, the newspaper's owner Graham reprimands Brad for the missing story and fires him. Brad says that his contract does not allow him to be fired, so Graham decides to make him write the lonely hearts column.

Brad is furious, but has no choice but to accept the position. He also decides to keep an eye on the Frank J. Canfield story. Gerry, the current writer of the column, who also was demoted to the position by Brad, is delighted by the news. When Gerry accuses him of having no guts because he cannot handle the job, Brad puts his skills to work, and the column becomes very popular.

One day, Rosa Marinello comes to the newspaper's office, looking for Nellie Nelson, Brad's pseudonym for the column. She ask Nellie to intervene on her behalf because her undertaker father no longer wants her to marry her fiancé. When Brad learns that Canfield was last seen at the same address where Rosa lives, he agrees to go. Brad finds out that gangster Brownell attended a funeral around the time of Canfield's disappearance. Brad later discovers that Canfield was framed and murdered by his rival. Brad advises Brownell to dig up Canfield's body and transfer it to another grave, and gets a photograph of the body and takes it to his newspaper. Brownell is arrested and tried for murder. Canfield is cleared, and Brad is reinstated as the newspaper's editor.

== Cast ==
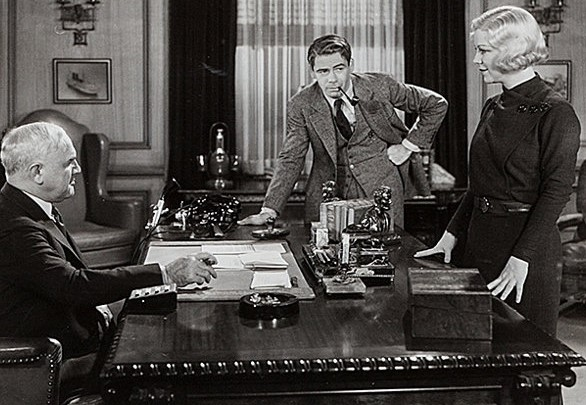
Berton Churchill, Paul Muni and Glenda Farrell in Hi Nellie! (1934)

- Paul Muni as Brad
- Glenda Farrell as Gerry
- Ned Sparks as Shammy
- Robert Barrat as Brownell
- Berton Churchill as Graham
- Katharine Sergava as Grace
- Hobart Cavanaugh as Fullerton
- Douglass Dumbrille as Dawes
- Edward Ellis as O'Connell
- Paul Kaye as Helwig
- Donald Meek as Durkin
- John Qualen as Steve (uncredited)

== Preservation status ==
A copy of the film is preserved by the Library of Congress.

== Other notes ==
The story on which the screenplay was based, written by Roy Chanslor, was remade into the movie The House Across the Street, albeit with a different screenwriter, in 1949.

== Box office ==
According to Warner Bros records the film earned $407,000 domestically and $240,000 internationally.
