= Exposed (1938 film) =

1938 film by Harold D. Schuster

- Movie poster
- Directed by: Harold D. Schuster
- Screenplay by: Charles Kaufman; Franklin Coen
- Produced by: Max Golden
- Starring: Glenda Farrell; Otto Kruger; Herbert Mundin
- Cinematography: Stanley Cortez
- Edited by: Maurice Wright
- Music by: Frank Skinner
- Production company: Universal Pictures
- Release date: November 4, 1938
- Running time: 63 minutes
- Country: United States
- Language: English
- Budget: $98,000

Exposed is a 1938 American drama film starring Glenda Farrell, Otto Kruger and Herbert Mundin. The film was directed by Harold D. Schuster and is based on George R. Bilson's unpublished story "Candid Camera Girl". It was released by Universal Pictures on November 4, 1938. A magazine photo-newswoman tried to make amends after exposing a lawyer and complication ensues when they fall in love.

== Plot ==
Click Stewart is a magazine photographer. She is told by her editor Steve Conway to find an exclusive story for the magazine. Click discovers that a former lawyer William Reardon who disappeared several years before is now living on the street. When the story and her photos are published, William Reardon sued the magazine. Click decides to meet with William and asks him to dismiss the lawsuit. William explains to Click that he quit his law practice after convicting an innocent man and sending him to the electric chair. William agrees to drop the lawsuit when Click offers to find the man's daughter and make restitution. Click learns that the man's daughter died in a car accident and persuades Betty Clarke, her actress roommate to pretend to be the man's daughter.

William meets Betty and drops his lawsuit, with the story making the newspaper headline. However, Mike Romero who works for a gangster named Tony Mitchell knows the truth and decides to blackmail Betty. Click plans to expose Tony Mitchell's protection racket. William who is now working as a lawyer again is helping Click. They plan to gather enough evidence of Mike's illegal activity to arrest him, with William and Click falling in love at the same time. When William learns that the man's real daughter is actually dead, he confronts Click who is talking to Tony Mitchell. William recognizes Tony as the person who framed the man he convicted. Later, William reconciles with Click and successfully prosecutes Tony and his man.

== Cast ==
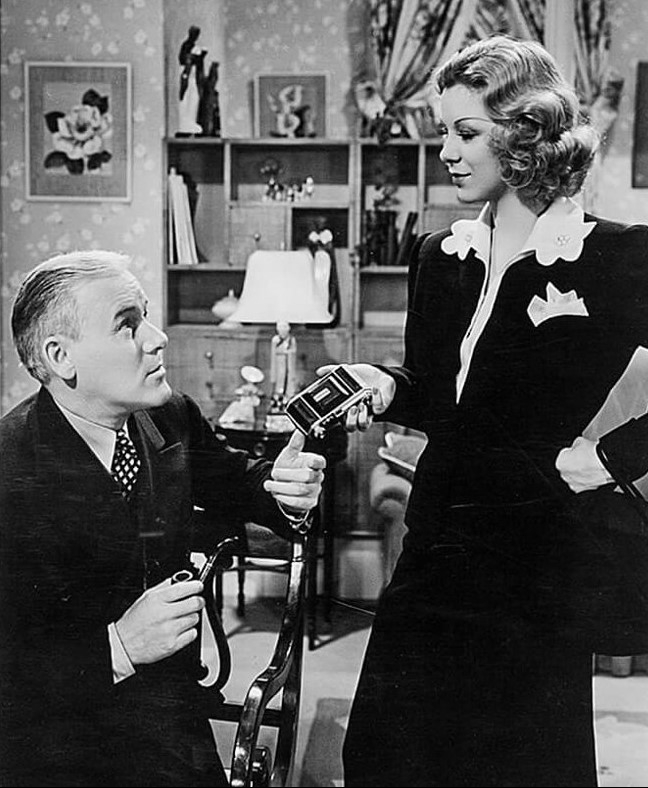
Otto Kruger and Glenda Farrell in Exposed (1938)

- Glenda Farrell as "Click" Stewart
- Otto Kruger as William Reardon
- Herbert Mundin as "Skippy"
- Charles D. Brown as Steve Conway
- Richard Lane as Tony Mitchell
- Lorraine Krueger as Betty Clarke
- Bernard Nedell as Mike Romero
- David Oliver as Tim
- Lester Dorr as "Slim" (uncredited)

== Reception ==
Frank S.Nugent of The New York Times writes in his movie review: "Flash is not only the name of a picture magazine for which Glenda Farrell makes sensational photographs in a film called "Exposed," now at the Rialto. It is also the impossible space of time in which much of the important action coincidentally happens therein. For just with the innocent snapshot of a presumed Bowery bum Miss Farrell and her magazine set in motion a train of rapid-fire events which culminate in the round-up of a gang of racketeers, the regeneration of a demoralized lawyer and the tinkle of wedding bells. In short, "Exposed" is just another of those headlong reportorial melodramas which pause neither for breath, explanations nor a moment's cool reflection. It is not very true to Life."
