= The St. Louis Kid =

1934 film by Ray Enright

- Directed by: Ray Enright
- Screenplay by: Warren Duff; Seton I. Miller
- Based on: A Perfect Weekend; 1934 story in Collier's by Frederick Hazlitt Brennan
- Produced by: Samuel Bischoff
- Starring: James Cagney; Patricia Ellis; Allen Jenkins
- Cinematography: Sidney Hickox
- Edited by: Clarence Kolster
- Music by: Bernhard Kaun
- Distributed by: Warner Bros. Pictures
- Release date: November 10, 1934
- Running time: 67 minutes
- Country: United States
- Language: English

The St. Louis Kid is a 1934 drama film directed by Ray Enright and starring James Cagney.

== Plot ==
A truck driver gets mixed up in a union dispute after a union leader is killed and his girlfriend is kidnapped after witnessing the crime.

== Cast ==
- James Cagney as Eddie Kennedy
- Patricia Ellis as Ann Reid
- Allen Jenkins as Buck
- Robert Barrat as Farmer Benson
- Hobart Cavanaugh as Richardson
- Spencer Charters as Messeldopp
- Addison Richards as Mr. Brown
- Dorothy Dare as Gracie Smith
- Arthur Aylesworth as Judge Jeremiah Jones
- Charles C. Wilson as Mr. Harris - the Trucking Company Boss
- William B. Davidson as Joe Hunter
