= Hugh Herbert =

American actor and comedian (1885–1952)

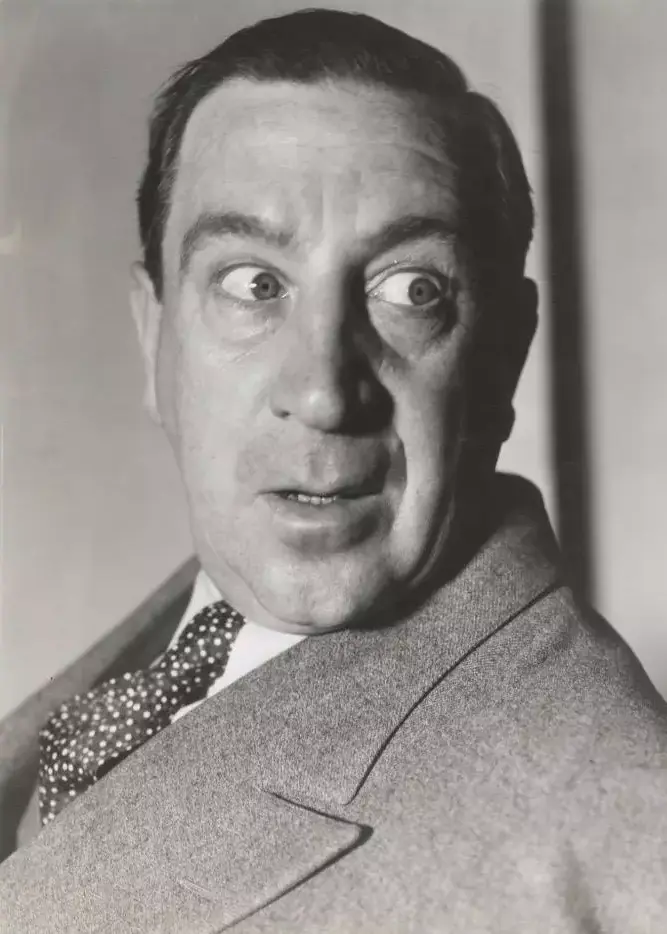
- Herbert in the 1930s
- Born: August 10, 1885; Binghamton, New York, U.S.
- Died: March 12, 1952 (aged 66); North Hollywood, California, U.S.
- Burial place: Holy Cross Cemetery, Culver City, California
- Occupations: Actor, comedian
- Years active: 1927–1952
- Spouse: Rose Epstein (m. 1932; div. 1949)

Hugh Herbert (August 10, 1885 – March 12, 1952) was an American motion-picture comedian. He began his career in vaudeville and wrote more than 150 plays and sketches.

== Career ==
Born in Binghamton, New York, Herbert attended Cornell University. As an actor, he "had many serious roles, and for years was seen on major vaudeville circuits as a pathetic old Hebrew."

The advent of talking pictures brought stage-trained actors to Hollywood, and Herbert soon became a popular movie comedian. His screen character was usually flustered and absent-minded. He would flutter his fingers together and talk to himself, repeating the same phrases: "Hoo-hoo-hoo, wonderful, wonderful, hoo hoo hoo!" So many imitators (including Curly Howard of The Three Stooges, Mickey Rooney as Andy Hardy and Etta Candy in the Wonder Woman comic book series) copied the catchphrase as "woo woo" that Herbert even began to use "woo woo" rather than "hoo hoo" in the 1940s.

Herbert's early movies, like Wheeler & Woolsey's feature Hook, Line and Sinker (1930), cast him in generic comedy roles that could have been taken by any comedian. He developed a unique screen personality, complete with a silly giggle, and this new character caught on quickly. He was frequently featured in Warner Brothers films of the 1930s, including Bureau of Missing Persons, Footlight Parade (both 1933), Dames, Fog Over Frisco, Fashions of 1934 (all 1934), and Gold Diggers of 1935 (1935), as well as A Midsummer Night's Dream (also 1935), a film adaptation of Shakespeare's play. He played leads in "B comedies", notably Sh! The Octopus (1937), a comedy-mystery featuring an exceptional unmasking of the culprit.

Herbert was often caricatured in Warners' Looney Tunes shorts of the 1930s/1940s, such as Speaking of the Weather (1937) and The Hardship of Miles Standish (1940). One of the minor characters in the Terrytoons short The Talking Magpies (1946) is also a recognizably Herbertesque bird. In 1939, Herbert signed with Universal Pictures, where, as at Warners, he played supporting roles in major films and leading roles in minor ones. One of his performances from this period is in the Olsen and Johnson comedy Hellzapoppin' (1941), in which he played a nutty detective.

Herbert joined Columbia Pictures in 1943 and became a familiar face in short subjects, with the same actors and directors who made the Stooges shorts. Commenting on these two-reel films, The Columbia Comedy Shorts notes for example that "Who's Hugh? (1943), His Hotel Sweet (1944), A Knight and a Blonde (1944) and Woo, Woo! (1945) are alarmingly similar in content; viewing them together, it's nearly impossible to detect" any difference. He continued to star in these comedies for the remainder of his life.

Herbert wrote six screenplays, co-wrote the screenplays for the films Lights of New York (1928) and Second Wife (1930), and contributed to The Great Gabbo (1929) and others. He acted in three films co-written by the much more prolific (but unrelated) screenwriter F. Hugh Herbert: Fashions of 1934 (1934), We're in the Money (1935) and Colleen (1936). He also directed one film, He Knew Women (1930).

== Recognition ==
Herbert has a star at 6251 Hollywood Boulevard on the Hollywood Walk of Fame. It was dedicated February 8, 1960.

== Personal life ==
Herbert was married to Rose Epstein, who was also known by the name Anita Pam.

Herbert died on March 12, 1952, at age 66, from cardiovascular disease in North Hollywood, Los Angeles.

== Selected filmography ==
- Husbands for Rent (1927) as Valet
- Caught in the Fog (1928) as Detective Riley
- Mind Your Business (1928, short)
- Danger Lights (1930) as Professor – the Hobo
- Hook, Line and Sinker (1930) as Hotel House Detective
- She Went for a Tramp (1931, short)
- Laugh and Get Rich (1931) as Joe Austin
- The Sin Ship (1931) as Charlie
- Traveling Husbands (1931) as Hymie Schwartz
- Friends and Lovers (1931) as McNellis
- The Lost Squadron (1932) as Fritz
- Million Dollar Legs (1932) as Secretary of the Treasury
- Faithless (1932) as Mr. Peter M. Blainey
- Sham Poo, the Magician (1932, short) as Sham Poo
- Strictly Personal (1933) as Wetzel
- Diplomaniacs (1933) as Chinaman
- She Had to Say Yes (1933) as Luther Haines
- Goodbye Again (1933) as Harvey Wilson
- Bureau of Missing Persons (1933) as Hank Slade
- Footlight Parade (1933) as Bowers
- 'Tis Spring (1933, short)
- College Coach (1933) as J-Marvin Barnett
- From Headquarters (1933) as Manny Wales
- Convention City (1933) as Hotstetter
- Easy to Love (1934) as Detective
- Fashions of 1934 (1934) as Joe Ward
- Wonder Bar (1934) as Pratt
- Harold Teen (1934) as Ed Rathburn
- Merry Wives of Reno (1934) as Colonel Fitch
- The Merry Frinks (1934) as Joe 'Poppa' Frink
- Fog Over Frisco (1934) as Izzy Wright
- Dames (1934) as Ezra Ounce
- Kansas City Princess (1934) as Junior Ashcraft
- Good Badminton (1935, short) as Hugh
- Sweet Adeline (1935) as Rupert Rockingham
- Gold Diggers of 1935 (1935) as T. Mosley Thorpe
- Traveling Saleslady (1935) as Elmer
- We're in the Money (1935) as Lawyer Homer Bronson
- A Midsummer Night's Dream (1935) as Snout, the Tinker
- To Beat the Band (1935) as Hugo Twist / Elizabeth Twist
- Miss Pacific Fleet (1935) as Mr. J. August Freytag
- Colleen (1936) as Cedric Ames
- One Rainy Afternoon (1936) as Toto
- We Went to College (1936) as Professor Standish
- Love Begins at Twenty (1936) as Horatio Gillingwater
- Sing Me a Love Song (1936) as Siegfried Hammerschlag
- Top of the Town (1937) as Hubert
- That Man's Here Again (1937) as Thomas J. Jesse
- A Day at Santa Anita (1937, short) as Himself (uncredited)
- The Singing Marine (1937) as Aeneas Phinney / Clarissa
- Marry the Girl (1937) as John B. Radway
- The Perfect Specimen (1937) as Killigrew Shaw
- Sh! The Octopus (1937) as Kelly
- Hollywood Hotel (1937) as Chester Marshall
- Gold Diggers in Paris (1938) as Maurice Giraud
- Men Are Such Fools (1938) as Harvey Bates
- Four's a Crowd (1938) as Jenkins
- The Great Waltz (1938) as Hofbauer
- The Family Next Door (1939) as George Pierce
- The Lady's from Kentucky (1939) as Mousey Johnson
- Eternally Yours (1939) as Benton
- Little Accident (1939) as Herbert Pearson
- La Conga Nights (1940) as Henry I. Dibble Jr. / Faith Dibble / Hope Dibble / Charity Dibble / Prudence Dibble / Mrs. Henry I. Dibble Jr. / Henry I. Dibble Sr.
- Private Affairs (1940) as Angus McPherson
- A Little Bit of Heaven (1940) as Pop Loring
- The Villain Still Pursued Her (1940) as Frederick Healy
- Hit Parade of 1941 (1940) as Ferdinand Farraday
- Slightly Tempted (1940) as Professor Ross
- Meet the Chump (1941) as Hugh Mansfield
- The Black Cat (1941) as Mr. Penny
- Hello, Sucker (1941) as Hubert Worthington Clippe
- Badlands of Dakota (1941) as Rocky Plummer
- Hellzapoppin' (1941) as Quimby
- Don't Get Personal (1942) as Elmer Whippet / Oscar Whippet
- You're Telling Me (1942) as Hubert Abercrombie Gumm
- There's One Born Every Minute (1942) as Lemuel P. Twine / Abner Twine / Colonel Cladius Zebediah Twine
- Mrs. Wiggs of the Cabbage Patch (1942) as Marcus Throckmorton
- It's a Great Life (1943) as Timothy Brewster
- Stage Door Canteen (1943) as Himself
- Pitchin' in the Kitchen (1943, short) as Adam Spiggott
- Who's Hugh? (1943, short) as Himself
- Oh, Baby! (1944, short) as Elmer 'Picklepuss' Burns
- His Hotel Sweet (1944, short) as Himself
- Kismet (1944) as Feisal
- Ever Since Venus (1944) as P.G. Grimble
- A Knight and a Blonde (1944, short) as Himself
- Music for Millions (1944) as Uncle Ferdinand
- Woo, Woo! (1945, short)
- Wife Decoy (1945, short) as Hughie Hawkins
- The Mayor's Husband (1945, short) as Himself
- One Way to Love (1946) as Eustace P. Trumble
- When the Wife's Away (1946, short) as Himself
- Get Along Little Zombie (1946, short) as Himself
- Honeymoon Blues (1946, short) as Himself
- Hot Heir (1947, short) as Himself
- Nervous Shakedown (1947, short) as Mr. Penn
- Blondie in the Dough (1947) as Llewellyn Simmons
- Should Husbands Marry? (1947, short) as Himself
- On Our Merry Way (1948) as Eli Hobbs
- Tall, Dark and Gruesome (1948, short) as Hugh Sherlock, playwright
- So This Is New York (1948) as Mr. Lucius Trumball
- One Touch of Venus (1948) as Mercury (scenes deleted)
- The Girl from Manhattan (1948) as Aaron Goss
- A Song Is Born (1948) as Professor Twingle
- A Pinch in Time (1948, short) as Himself
- Trapped by a Blonde (1949, short) as Himself
- The Beautiful Blonde from Bashful Bend (1949) as Doctor
- Super Wolf (1949, short) as Aunt Fanny / Dave McGurk alias Dave the Drip
- One Shivery Night (1950, short) as Himself
- A Slip and a Miss (1950, short) sa Himself
- Woo-Woo Blues (1951, short) as Himself
- Havana Rose (1951) as Filbert Fillmore
- Trouble In-Laws (1951, short) as Himself
- The Gink in the Sink (1952, short) as Himself

=== As writer ===
- Sunny California (1928, short)
- Lights of New York (1928)
- Mind Your Business (1928, short)
- The Great Gabbo (1930)
- The Second Wife (1930)
- He Knew Women (1930)
- The Sin Ship (1931)

=== As director ===
- He Knew Women (1930)
