= Havana Widows =

1933 film

- Movie poster
- Directed by: Ray Enright
- Written by: Earl Baldwin
- Starring: Joan Blondell; Glenda Farrell
- Cinematography: George Barnes
- Edited by: Clarence Kolster
- Production company: First National Pictures
- Distributed by: Warner Bros. Pictures
- Release date: November 18, 1933
- Running time: 62 minutes
- Country: United States
- Language: English

Havana Widows is a 1933 American pre-Code comedy film directed by Ray Enright, starring Joan Blondell and Glenda Farrell. It was released by Warner Bros. Pictures on November 18, 1933. Two chorus girls travel to Havana in search of rich husbands. Their target is Deacon Jones, a self-appointed moralist who cannot drink without getting drunk.

The film is the first of a series of five movies by Warner Bros. where Blondell and Farrell were paired as blonde bombshell comedy team, throughout the early 1930s. The other films in the series include Kansas City Princess (1934), Traveling Saleslady (1935), We're in the Money (1935) and Miss Pacific Fleet (1935). Four of the five films were directed by Ray Enright. Farrell and Blondell also co-starred in other Warner Bros. movies: Three on a Match (1932), I've Got Your Number (1934) and Gold Diggers of 1937 (1936).

== Plot ==
Mae Knight and Sadie Appleby, chorus line dancers in a New York City burlesque show, are visited by a former showgirl acquaintance who received a rich settlement for breach of promise from a married man she met in Havana. Sadie decides they will follow her example. Pretending that Mae's mother in Kansas is sick, they get Herman Brody to promise to lend them $1500. Herman does not have the money himself, but convinces his boss, Butch O'Neill, to loan it to him. Unfortunately, Herman loses the money gambling (in Butch's own casino). Insurance salesman Otis needs one more sale to get a $5000 bonus, so he offers Herman $1500 to buy a policy. Herman insures Mae's life, with him as the beneficiary.

In Havana, Sadie and Mae pretend to be rich widows. They think they have it made when they find Deacon R. Jones, a wealthy horse breeder who cannot afford a scandal, in their bed by mistake. However, Mae is smitten with Deacon's handsome son Bob, but finds out that Bob has no money of his own. When Mae and Sadie encounter Deacon's wife, they realize that a marriage proposal from him is out of the question. Their alcoholic lawyer, Duffy, advises them to trap Deacon in a scandalous situation and blackmail him instead.

Meanwhile, the bank calls to verify the forged check. Panicking, Herman goes to see Otis, only to discover that he has lost his job and left town. When he tries to track Sadie and Mae down, he learns that they are not in Kansas. Herman follows them to Havana. He meets Duffy in a local bar. Duffy talks him into playing Mae's outraged husband. Duffy has Deacon kidnapped, but he resists the attempt to frame him. Butch finds Herman, but he only wants him to return to work because his luck has been bad ever since Herman left. Bob decides to get a job in New York and marry Mae, and Sadie marries Herman.

== Cast ==
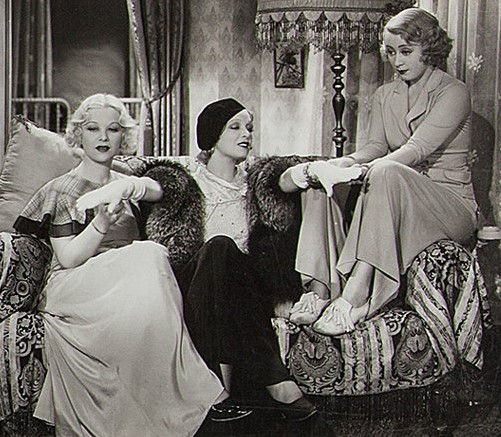
Glenda Farrell and Joan Blondell in Havana Widows (1933)

- Joan Blondell as Mae Knight
- Glenda Farrell as Sadie Appleby
- Guy Kibbee as Deacon Jones
- Allen Jenkins as Herman Brody
- Lyle Talbot as Bob Jones
- Frank McHugh as Duffy
- Ruth Donnelly as Mrs. Emily Jones
- Hobart Cavanaugh as Mr. Otis
- Ralph Ince as G. W. "Butch" O'Neill
- Maude Eburne as Mrs. Ryan
- George Cooper as Paymaster Mullins
- Charles Wilson as Mr. Timberg

== Reception ==
The New York Times movie review said: "It is still possible to enjoy the old reliables in a mild way. Joan Blondell and Glenda Farrell, as the flip and caustic sisters of the chorus; Guy Kibbee, as the thick-skulled business man with a confused ambition to see life; Allen Jenkins, as the dead-pan gangster; Frank McHugh, as the perennial drunk who can slant in several directions at once; Ruth Donnelly, as the prim wife out of tank-town burlesque—they are staple commodities. They are amusing and likable players; they deserve a better fate than comedies like "Havana Widows". The new film is an aimless attempt to wring some new humors out of the breach-of-promise racket. Mr. Kibbee is the subject of the extortion scheme in which almost the whole cast is involved. The Misses Blondell and Farrell, down on their luck and badly in need of a grub-stake, arrange with Mr. McHugh for the amiable Mr. Kibbee to be found en déshabillé in a hotel room. Unfortunately, Miss Blondell loses her heart to the victim's handsome son. That confuses matters. Let "Havana Widows" rest there."

== Home media ==
Warner Archive released a double feature DVD collection of Havana Widows (1933) and I've Got Your Number (1934) on December 13, 2011.
