= He Knew Women =

1930 film by Hugh Herbert

- Theatrical release poster
- Directed by: Hugh Herbert
- Written by: William B. Jutte; Hugh Herbert
- Based on: The Second Man by S. N. Behrman
- Produced by: William Le Baron
- Starring: Lowell Sherman; Alice Joyce
- Cinematography: Edward Cronjager
- Edited by: Ann McKnight; George Marsh
- Distributed by: RKO Radio Pictures
- Release dates: April 18, 1930 (New York City); May 18, 1930 (United States)
- Running time: 65 minutes
- Country: United States
- Language: English
- Budget: $103,000
- Box office: $193,000

He Knew Women is a 1930 American pre-Code comedy film directed by Hugh Herbert, from a screenplay by him and William B. Jutte, which was adapted from S. N. Behrman's 1927 play The Second Man. It starred Lowell Sherman and Alice Joyce, in her second to last film role. The film broke even.

== Plot ==
Geoffrey Clarke is a poor poet, who has his eyes on the fortune of a rich widow, Alice Frayne, in order to keep him in the lifestyle he feels he deserves. Geoffrey is pursued, however, by the young and lovely, yet poor, Monica Grey. Monica, in turn, is pursued by the chemist, Austin Lowe.

When Geoffrey tells Monica that she would be better off with Austin, she is disdainful of the suggestion. Undaunted, he sets the two of them up to have dinner at Geoffrey's apartment. During the dinner, Monica is completely unimpressed with Austin, but when she discovers that Alice has been financially supporting Geoffrey, out of spite she agrees to marry Austin. Regretting her decision, later, when she learns that Alice intends to marry Geoffrey, Monica becomes desperate and falsely accuses Geoffrey in front of the others of having ruined her. This causes Alice to break off her engagement with Geoffrey. However, it has a drastic effect on Austin, who gets a pistol and takes a very poorly aimed shot at Geoffrey. Standing up for her honor causes Monica to re-evaluate her feelings for Austin, and she agrees, this time for real, to marry him. When the falsity of Monica's claim is revealed, Geoffrey and Alice reconcile as well.

== Cast ==
- Lowell Sherman as Geoffrey Clarke
- Alice Joyce as Alice Frayne
- David Manners as Austin Lowe
- Frances Dade as Monica Grey

(cast list as per the AFI database)

== Reception ==
Variety gave the film a positive review, complimenting the direction of Herbert, as well as the acting of Sherman and Dade, and saying of the overall production: "This is virtually a four-character picture and as near a play transcription for the screen as has been done. Despite all that and the four walls set up around the action, it holds the interest reasonably well, providing a few outstanding kicks."

== Notes ==
S. N. Behrman's play, The Second Man, on which this screenplay is based, played from April through September in 1927 at The Guild Theater. It starred Lynn Fontanne and her husband, Alfred Lunt, the Tony Award-winning Lunt and Fontanne duo.

A copy of this film is kept at the Library of Congress.
