= Traveling Saleslady =

1935 film by Ray Enright

- Theatrical release poster
- Directed by: Ray Enright
- Screenplay by: F. Hugh Herbert; Manuel Seff; Benny Rubin
- Story by: Frank Howard Clark
- Produced by: Samuel Bischoff
- Starring: Joan Blondell; Glenda Farrell
- Cinematography: George Barnes
- Edited by: Owen Marks
- Music by: Bernhard Kaun
- Distributed by: Warner Bros. Pictures
- Release date: March 28, 1935
- Running time: 63 minutes
- Country: United States
- Language: English

Traveling Saleslady is a 1935 American comedy film directed by Ray Enright and starring Joan Blondell and Glenda Farrell. It was released by Warner Bros. Pictures on March 28, 1935. It is one of five films by Warner Bros. where Farrell and Blondell were paired as two blonde bombshells. The other films include: Havana Widows (1933), Kansas City Princess (1934), We're in the Money (1935) and Miss Pacific Fleet (1935). Actress Joan Blondell was married to the film's cinematographer George Barnes at the time of filming.

== Plot ==
Angela Twitchell, the daughter of Rufus Twitchell, the founder of Twitchell's Toothpaste, wants to work for her father's New York company. But her father is convinced that women have no place in the business. Rufus is losing sales to rival company own by Schmidts. but he is too stubborn to listen to any new ideas or mount a new advertising campaign. Angela tries to help her father by bringing him an idea for a cocktail flavored toothpaste. When he refuses to listen, she takes the idea to Schmidt, using an alias. Schmidt loves the idea and hires her to sell the product. Angela's first customer, Claudette, the head of a chain of pharmacies, is committed to Twitchell's company, because she is in love with the company's salesman Pat O'Connor.

On the road, Angela plans to outsell Pat. When she suspects that Pat is taking an early train in order to make a sale on board the train, she boards the train herself and beats him to the customer. Pat and Angela fall in love, but Pat does not know Angela's true identity. Back in New York, Pat and Rufus plan their strategy for the upcoming Chicago pharmacy convention, but once again, Angela uses every tactic to steal sales away from Twitchell's company. Pat accuses her of unethical behavior and refuses to see her again. Rufus and Schmidt discuss a merger, but negotiations are stalled until Angela shows up. Rufus is outraged that his own daughter has been working for his competitor. Then she reminds them that she only gave the rights to Cocktail Toothpaste to Schmidt for a year; she will only turn them over to a merged company. Later, Angela makes up with Pat.

== Cast ==
- Joan Blondell as Angela Twitchell
- Glenda Farrell as Claudette
- William Gargan as Pat O'Connor
- Hugh Herbert as Elmer
- Grant Mitchell as Rufus Twitchell
- Al Shean as Schmidt
- Ruth Donnelly as Mrs. Twitchell
- Johnny Arthur as Melton
- Bert Roach as Harry

== Reception ==
Andre Sennwald of The New York Times writes in his film review: "Traveling Saleslady is a lively and moderately diverting little comedy out of the stream of "Convention City" to which it is, however, inferior. Miss Blondell and Mr. Herbert have played their respective roles so often in the past that they probably don't need to read their scripts more than once. The photoplay presents most of the familiar faces in the Warner repertory group. The inventory includes Grant Mitchell as the conservative toothpaste magnate, Ruth Donnelly as his wife, Al Shean as his enterprising rival, Glenda Farrell as a fresh dame, and Bert Roach as a half-wit salesman who seems to be three sheets in the wind even when he hasn't been within miles of the Cocktail Toothpaste samples. They are all diverting enough in a rather familiar way."

== Home media ==
Warner Archive released a double feature DVD collection of Traveling Saleslady (1935) and Miss Pacific Fleet (1935) on April 5, 2012.
