= Goodbye Again (1933 film) =

1933 film

- Movie poster
- Directed by: Michael Curtiz
- Screenplay by: Ben Markson
- Based on: Goodbye Again; 1932 play by George Haight and Allan Scott
- Produced by: Henry Blanke
- Starring: Warren William; Joan Blondell; Genevieve Tobin; Hugh Herbert; Wallace Ford; Helen Chandler; Hobart Cavanaugh; Ruth Donnelly
- Cinematography: George Barnes
- Edited by: Thomas Pratt
- Music by: Leo F. Forbstein
- Production company: First National Pictures
- Distributed by: Warner Bros. Pictures
- Release date: September 9, 1933
- Running time: 66 min
- Country: United States
- Language: English

Goodbye Again is a 1933 pre-Code romantic comedy film produced by First National Pictures and distributed by Warner Bros. Pictures.

It was directed by Michael Curtiz and produced by Henry Blanke from a screenplay by Ben Markson, based on the play by George Haight and Allan Scott. Cinematography was by George Barnes and costume design by Orry-Kelly.

The film stars Warren William, Joan Blondell, Genevieve Tobin, Hugh Herbert, Wallace Ford, Helen Chandler, Hobart Cavanaugh, and Ruth Donnelly.

The film was remade by Lloyd Bacon in 1941 as Honeymoon for Three, starring Ann Sheridan and George Brent. The remake also was set in Cleveland.

== Plot ==
On tour in Cleveland, famous author Kenneth Bixby decides to reignite a romance with ex-sweetheart Julie, skipping a downtown engagement at Halle's. However, Julie's family, her husband Harvey, and Bixby's loyal secretary Anne (who has been carrying a torch for her boss for years), prefer that Bixby stick to writing and stay away from Julie.

== Cast ==
- Warren William as Kenneth Bixby
- Joan Blondell as Anne Rogers
- Genevieve Tobin as Julie Wilson
- Hugh Herbert as Harvey Wilson
- Wallace Ford as Arthur Westlake
- Helen Chandler as Elizabeth Clochessy
- Hobart Cavanaugh as Mr. Clayton
- Ruth Donnelly as Richview Hotel Maid
- Lester Dorr as Albany Hotel Desk Clerk
- Fred 'Snowflake' Toones as Train Porter

== See also ==
- List of American films of 1933
