= Joan Blondell =

American actress (1906–1979)

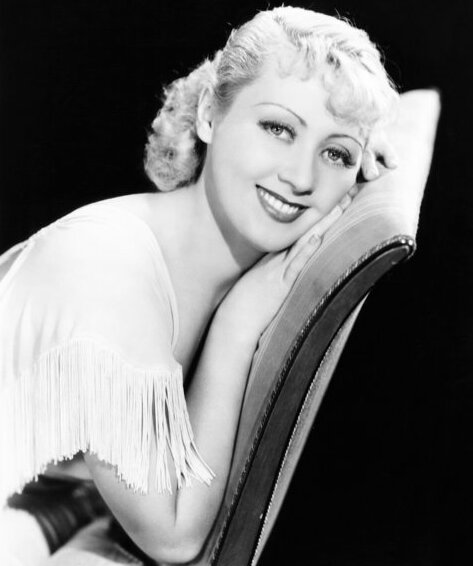
- Born: Rose Joan Blondell; August 30, 1906; New York City, U.S.
- Died: December 25, 1979 (aged 73); Santa Monica, California, U.S.
- Resting place: Forest Lawn Memorial Park, Glendale
- Occupation: Actress
- Years active: 1927–1979
- Spouses: George Barnes (m. 1933; div. 1936); Dick Powell (m. 1936; div. 1944); Mike Todd (m. 1947; div. 1950)
- Children: 2, including Norman Powell
- Relatives: Gloria Blondell (sister)

Rose Joan Blondell (August 30, 1906 – December 25, 1979) (Note: Some sources give her birth year as 1909, such as The Macmillan International Film Encyclopedia and The Oxford Companion to the American Musical.) was an American actress who performed in film and television for 50 years.

Blondell began her career in vaudeville. After winning a beauty pageant, she embarked on a film career, establishing herself as a Pre-Code staple of Warner Bros. Pictures in wisecracking, sexy roles, appearing in more than 100 films and television productions. She was described as a "brassy blonde with a heart of gold." Blondell was most active in film during the 1930s and early 1940s, and during that time co-starred with Glenda Farrell, a colleague and close friend, in nine films. Blondell continued acting on film and television for the rest of her life, often in small, supporting roles. She was nominated for an Academy Award for Best Supporting Actress for her performance in The Blue Veil (1951). In 1958, she was nominated for the Tony Award for Best Featured Actress in a Play for her performance as Mrs. Farrow in The Rope Dancers.

Near the end of her life, Blondell was nominated for a Golden Globe for Best Supporting Actress for her performance in Opening Night (1977). She was featured in two more films, the blockbuster musical Grease (1978) and Franco Zeffirelli's The Champ (1979), which was released shortly before her death from leukemia.

== Early life and education ==
Rose Joan Blondell was born in New York City to a vaudeville family; her birthdate was August 30, 1906, but was misrepresented as 1909 by Blondell earlier in her career and sometimes later conflated with the true year, including in her obituaries. Her father, Levi Bluestein, a vaudeville comedian known as Ed Blondell, was born in Poland to a Jewish family in 1866. He toured for many years starring in Blondell and Fennessy's stage version of The Katzenjammer Kids. Blondell's mother was Catherine (known as "Kathryn" or "Katie") Caine, born in Brooklyn, Kings County, New York (later Brooklyn, New York City), on April 13, 1884, to Irish-American parents. Joan's younger sister, Gloria Blondell, also an actress, was married to film producer Albert R. Broccoli. Joan also had a brother, Ed Blondell, Jr.

Joan's cradle was a property trunk as her parents moved from place to place. She made her first appearance on stage at the age of four months when she was carried on in a cradle as the daughter of Peggy Astaire in The Greatest Love. Her family comprised a vaudeville troupe, the Bouncing Blondells.

Joan had spent a year in Honolulu (1914–1915), where she attended Punahou School, and six months in Australia and had seen much of the world by the time her family stopped touring and settled in Dallas, Texas, when she was a teenager. Using the stage name "Rosebud" (acquired several years before, while a student at Chicago's Elmwood School, following her onstage portrayal of a rose during a show entitled In a Garden of Girls), Blondell won the 1926 Miss Dallas pageant, was a finalist in an early version of the Miss Universe pageant in May 1926, and placed fourth for Miss America 1926 in Atlantic City, New Jersey, in September of that year. She attended Santa Monica High School, where she acted in school plays and edited the school yearbook. While there, she gave her name as Rosebud Blondell, and when she attended North Texas State Teacher's College (now the University of North Texas) in Denton, Texas, in 1926–1927, where her mother was a local stage actress.

== Career ==
=== Early work and Broadway ===
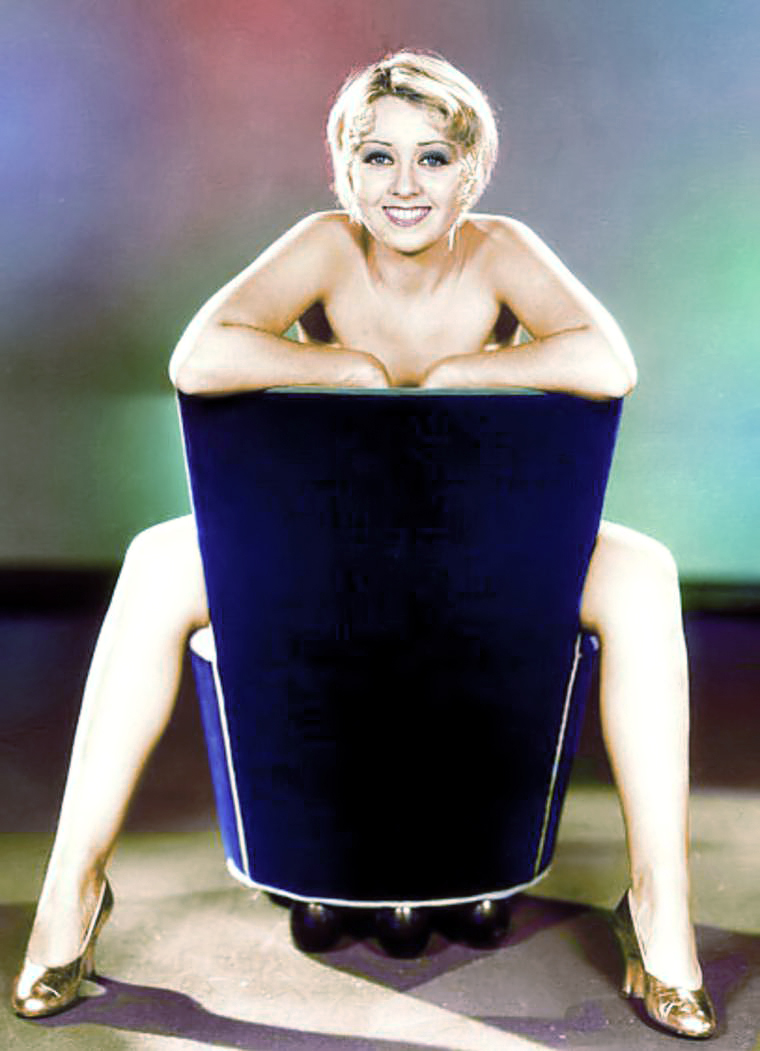
This 1932 promotional photo of Blondell was later banned under the Motion Picture Production Code.

Around 1927, she returned to New York, worked as a fashion model, a circus hand, a clerk in a store, joined a stock company to become an actress, and performed on Broadway. In 1930, she starred with James Cagney in Penny Arcade on Broadway. Penny Arcade lasted only three weeks, but Al Jolson saw it and bought the rights to the play for $20,000. He then sold the rights to Warner Bros., with the proviso that Blondell and Cagney be cast in the film version, named Sinners' Holiday (1930). Placed under contract by Warner Bros., she moved to Hollywood, where studio boss Jack L. Warner wanted her to change her name to "Inez Holmes", but Blondell refused. She began to appear in short subjects and was named as one of the WAMPAS Baby Stars in 1931.

=== 1930s film success ===
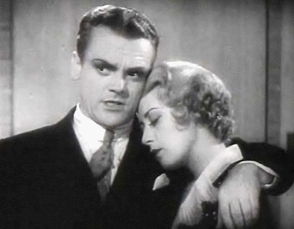
With James Cagney in Footlight Parade (1933)

Blondell was paired several more times with James Cagney in films, including The Public Enemy (1931) and Footlight Parade (1933), and was one-half of a gold-digging duo with Glenda Farrell in nine films. During the Great Depression, Blondell was one of the highest-paid individuals in the United States. Her stirring rendition of "Remember My Forgotten Man" in the Busby Berkeley production of Gold Diggers of 1933, in which she co-starred with Dick Powell and Ruby Keeler, became an anthem for the frustrations of unemployed people and the government's failed economic policies. In 1937, she starred opposite Errol Flynn in The Perfect Specimen. By the end of the decade, she had made nearly 50 films. She left Warner Bros. in 1939.

=== Mid-career and stage return ===
In 1943, Blondell returned to Broadway as the star of Mike Todd's short-lived production of The Naked Genius, a comedy written by Gypsy Rose Lee. She was well received in her later films, despite being relegated to character and supporting roles after 1945, when she was billed below the title for the first time in 14 years in Adventure, which starred Clark Gable and Greer Garson. She was also featured prominently in A Tree Grows in Brooklyn (1945) and Nightmare Alley (1947). In 1948, she left the screen for three years and concentrated on theater, performing in summer stock and touring with Cole Porter's musical Something for the Boys. She later reprised her role of Aunt Sissy in the musical version of A Tree Grows in Brooklyn for the national tour and played the nagging mother Mae Peterson in the national tour of Bye Bye Birdie.

=== Later film work ===
Blondell returned to Hollywood in 1950. Her performance in her next film, The Blue Veil (1951), earned her an Academy Award nomination for Best Actress in a Supporting Role. She played supporting roles in The Opposite Sex (1956), Desk Set (1957), and Will Success Spoil Rock Hunter? (1957). She received considerable acclaim for her performance as Lady Fingers in Norman Jewison's The Cincinnati Kid (1965), garnering a Golden Globe nomination and National Board of Review win for Best Supporting Actress. John Cassavetes cast her as a cynical, aging playwright in his film Opening Night (1977). Blondell was widely seen in two films released not long before her death – Grease (1978), and the remake of The Champ (1979) with Jon Voight and Rick Schroder. She also appeared in two films released after her death – The Glove (1979), and The Woman Inside (1981).

=== Television work ===
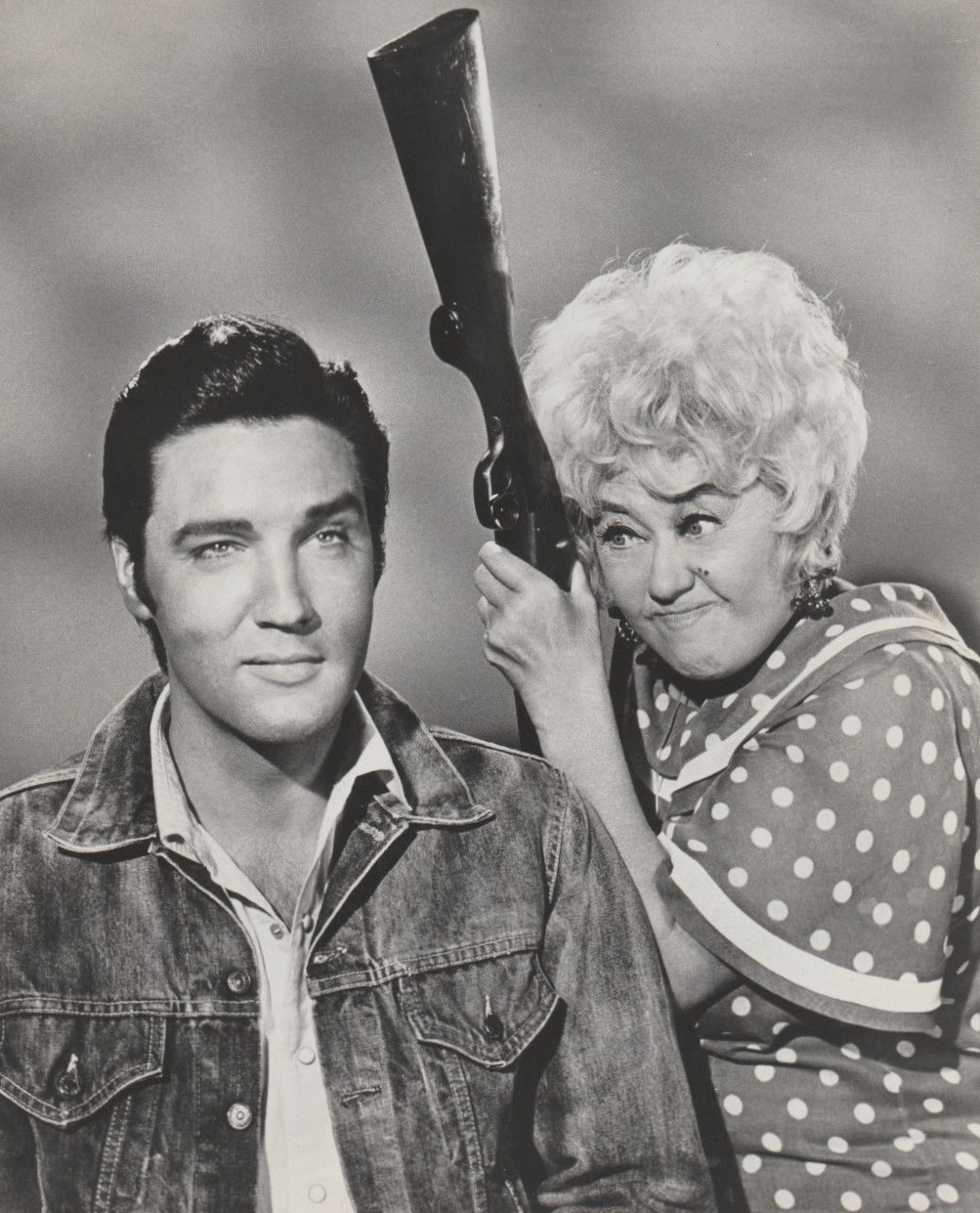
Blondell with Elvis Presley in Stay Away, Joe (1967)

Blondell also guest-starred in various television programs, including three 1963 episodes as the character Aunt Win in the sitcom The Real McCoys.

Also in 1963, Blondell was cast as the widowed Lucy Tutaine in the episode "The Train and Lucy Tutaine" on the series Death Valley Days, hosted by Stanley Andrews.

In March 1964, she appeared with William Demarest in The Twilight Zone episode "What's in the Box". The following month Blondell, Joe E. Brown and Buster Keaton guest-starred in "You're All Right, Ivy", the final episode of the short-lived circus drama The Greatest Show on Earth, as well as the directorial debut of its star Jack Palance. In 1965, she was in the running to replace Vivian Vance as Lucille Ball's sidekick on the hit CBS television comedy series The Lucy Show. After filming her second guest appearance as Joan Brenner (Lucy's new friend from California), Blondell walked off the set right after the episode had completed filming when Ball humiliated her by harshly criticizing her performance in front of the studio audience and technicians.

=== Final years and legacy ===
Blondell continued working on television. In 1968, she guest-starred on the CBS sitcom Family Affair, starring Brian Keith. She replaced Bea Benaderet, who was ill, for one episode on the CBS series Petticoat Junction. In that installment, Blondell played FloraBelle Campbell, a lady visitor to Hooterville, who had once dated Uncle Joe (Edgar Buchanan) and Sam Drucker (Frank Cady). The same year, Blondell co-starred in all 52 episodes of the ABC series Here Come the Brides. Blondell received two consecutive Emmy nominations for outstanding continued performance by an actress in a dramatic series for her role as Lottie Hatfield.

In 1971, she followed Sada Thompson in the off-Broadway hit The Effect of Gamma Rays on Man-in-the-Moon Marigolds, with a young Swoosie Kurtz playing one of her daughters.

In 1972, she had an ongoing supporting role in the series Banyon as Peggy Revere, who operated a secretarial school in the same building as Banyon's detective agency. This was a 1930s period action drama starring Robert Forster in the title role. Her students worked in Banyon's office, providing fresh faces for the show weekly. The series was replaced midseason.

Blondell has a motion pictures star on the Hollywood Walk of Fame for her contributions to the film industry. Her star is located at 6311 Hollywood Boulevard. In December 2007, the Museum of Modern Art in New York City mounted a retrospective of Blondell's films in connection with a new biography by film professor Matthew Kennedy. More recently her films have been screened by revival houses such as Film Forum in Manhattan, the UCLA Film and Television Archive in Los Angeles, the Hippodrome Cinema in Bo'ness, Scotland, and at the 2019 Lumière Film Festival in Grand Lyon, France.

She wrote a novel titled Center Door Fancy (New York: Delacorte Press, 1972), which was a thinly disguised autobiography with veiled references to June Allyson and Dick Powell.

In 2017, she was portrayed by Kathy Bates in Feud: Bette and Joan.

== Personal life ==
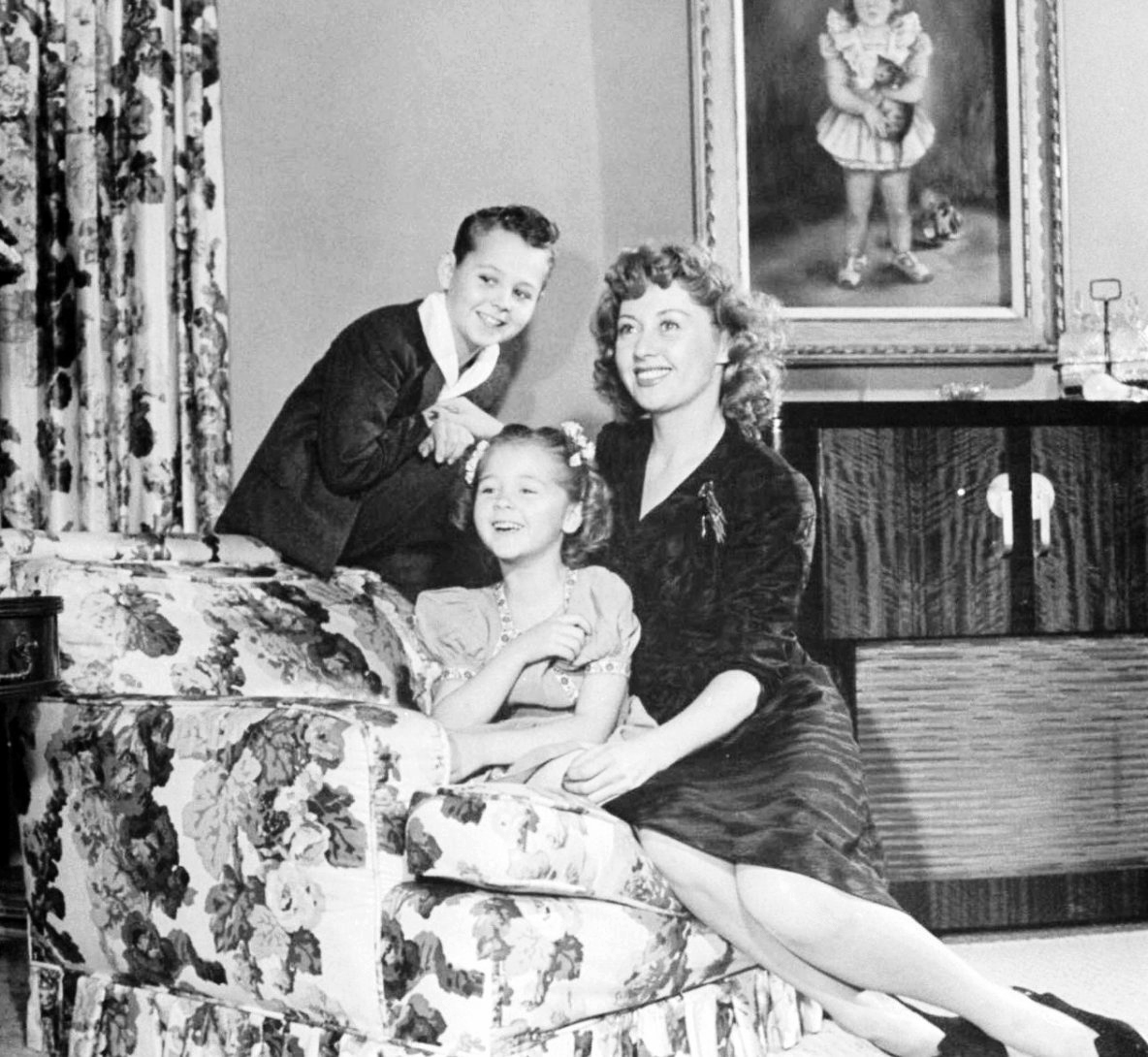
Blondell with daughter Ellen Powell and son Norman S. Powell, 1944

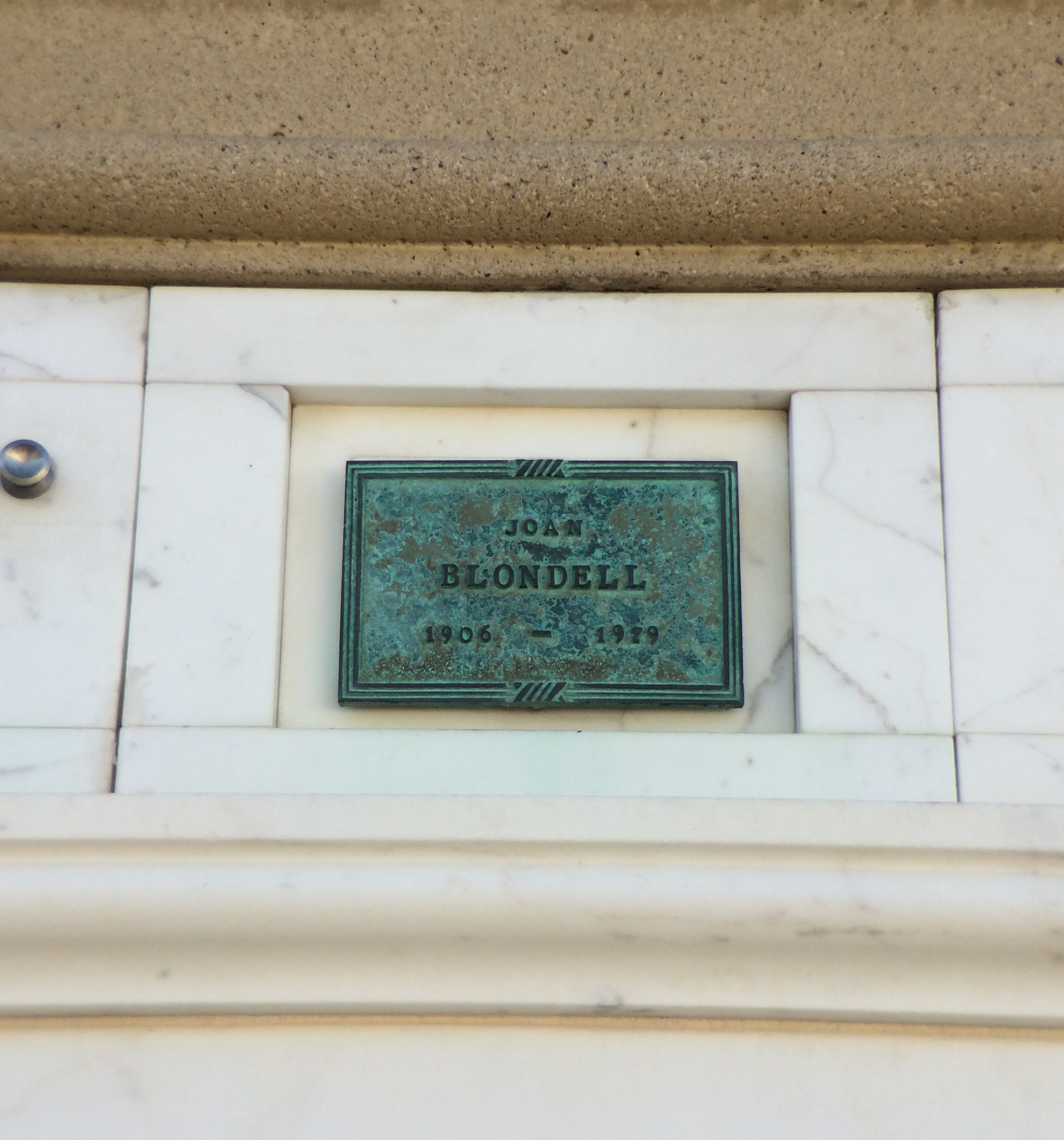
Blondell's niche in the columbarium at Forest Lawn Glendale

Blondell was married three times, first to cinematographer George Barnes in a private wedding ceremony on January 4, 1933, at the First Presbyterian Church in Phoenix, Arizona. They had one child, Norman Scott Barnes. Blondell and Barnes divorced in 1936.

On September 19, 1936, she married actor Dick Powell. They had a daughter, Ellen, who later became a studio hair stylist. Powell legally adopted Blondell's son Norman, who later became a producer, director, and television executive. Blondell and Powell divorced on July 14, 1944.

Clark Gable proposed marriage to her in 1945 but she declined.

On July 5, 1947, Blondell married producer Mike Todd. Her marriage to Todd was an emotional and financial disaster that ended in divorce in 1950. She once accused him of holding her outside a hotel window by her ankles. He was also a heavy spender who lost hundreds of thousands of dollars gambling (high-stakes bridge was one of his weaknesses) and went through a controversial bankruptcy during their marriage. An often-repeated myth is that Mike Todd left Blondell for Elizabeth Taylor, when in fact, she had left Todd of her own accord years before he met Taylor.

=== Death ===
Blondell died of leukemia in Santa Monica, California, on Christmas Day 1979, with her children and her sister at her bedside. She was cremated and her ashes interred in a columbarium at the Forest Lawn Memorial Park Cemetery in Glendale, California. She was 73 years old.

== Filmography ==
=== Feature films ===
Year	Title	Role	Notes
1930	The Office Wife	Katherine Murdock	
1930	Sinners' Holiday	Myrtle	
1931	Other Men's Women	Marie	
1931	Millie	Angie Wickerstaff	
1931	Illicit	Helen Dukie Childers	
1931	God's Gift to Women	Fifi	
1931	The Public Enemy	Mamie	
1931	My Past	Marian Moore	
1931	Big Business Girl	Pearl	
1931	Night Nurse	B. Maloney	
1931	The Reckless Hour	Myrtle Nichols	
1931	Blonde Crazy	Ann Roberts	
1932	Union Depot	Ruth Collins	
1932	The Greeks Had a Word for Them	Schatze Citroux	
1932	The Crowd Roars	Anne Scott	
1932	The Famous Ferguson Case	Maizie Dickson	
1932	Make Me a Star	Flips Montague	
1932	Miss Pinkerton	Miss Adams	
1932	Big City Blues	Vida Fleet	
1932	Three on a Match	Mary Keaton	
1932	Central Park	Dot	
1933	Lawyer Man	Olga Michaels	
1933	Broadway Bad	Tony Landers	
1933	Blondie Johnson	Blondie Johnson	
1933	Gold Diggers of 1933	Carol King	
1933	Goodbye Again	Anne Rogers	
1933	Footlight Parade	Nan Prescott	
1933	Havana Widows	Mae Knight	
1933	Convention City	Nancy Lorraine	Lost film
1934	I've Got Your Number	Marie Lawson	
1934	He Was Her Man	Rose Lawrence	
1934	Smarty	Vickie Wallace	
1934	Dames	Mabel Anderson	
1934	Kansas City Princess	Rosie Sturges	
1935	Traveling Saleslady	Angela Twitchell	
1935	Broadway Gondolier	Alice Hughes	
1935	We're in the Money	Ginger Stewart	
1935	Miss Pacific Fleet	Gloria Fay	
1936	Colleen	Minnie Hawkins	
1936	Sons O' Guns	Yvonne	
1936	Bullets or Ballots	Lee Morgan	
1936	Stage Struck	Peggy Revere	
1936	Three Men on a Horse	Mabel	
1936	Gold Diggers of 1937	Norma Perry	
1937	The King and the Chorus Girl	Dorothy Ellis	
1937	Back in Circulation	Timmy Blake	
1937	The Perfect Specimen	Mona Carter	
1937	Stand-In	Lester Plum	
1938	There's Always a Woman	Sally Reardon	
1939	Off the Record	Jane Morgan	
1939	East Side of Heaven	Mary Wilson	
1939	The Kid from Kokomo	Doris Harvey	
1939	Good Girls Go to Paris	Jenny Swanson	
1939	The Amazing Mr. Williams	Maxine Carroll	
1940	Two Girls on Broadway	Molly Mahoney	
1940	I Want a Divorce	Geraldine Brokaw	
1941	Topper Returns	Gail Richards	
1941	Model Wife	Joan Keathing Chambers	
1941	Three Girls About Town	Hope Banner	
1942	Lady for a Night	Jenny Blake	
1942	Cry 'Havoc'	Grace Lambert	
1945	A Tree Grows in Brooklyn	Aunt Sissy	
1945	Don Juan Quilligan	Margie Mossrock	
1945	Adventure	Helen Melohn	
1947	The Corpse Came C.O.D.	Rosemary Durant	
1947	Nightmare Alley	Zeena	
1947	Christmas Eve	Ann Nelson	
1950	For Heaven's Sake	Daphne	
1951	The Blue Veil	Annie Rawlins	Nominated—Academy Award for Best Supporting Actress
1956	The Opposite Sex	Edith Potter	
1957	Lizzie	Aunt Morgan	
1957	Desk Set	Peg Costello	
1957	This Could Be the Night	Crystal	
1957	Will Success Spoil Rock Hunter?	Violet	
1961	Angel Baby	Mollie Hays	
1964	Advance to the Rear	Easy Jenny	
1965	The Cincinnati Kid	Lady Fingers	National Board of Review Award for Best Supporting Actress; Nominated—Golden Globe Award for Best Supporting Actress – Motion Picture
1966	Ride Beyond Vengeance	Mrs. Lavender	
1967	Waterhole#3	Lavinia	
1967	Winchester '73	Larouge	TV movie
1967	The Spy in the Green Hat	Mrs. "Fingers" Steletto	
1968	Stay Away, Joe	Glenda Callahan	
1968	Kona Coast	Kittibelle Lightfoot	
1969	Big Daddy		
1970	The Phynx	Ruby	
1971	Support Your Local Gunfighter!	Jenny	
1975	The Dead Don't Die	Levinia	TV movie
1976	Won Ton Ton, the Dog Who Saved Hollywood	Landlady	
1976	Death at Love House	Marcella Geffenhart	
1977	The Baron		
1977	Opening Night	Sarah Goode	Nominated—Golden Globe Award for Best Supporting Actress – Motion Picture
1978	Grease	Vi	
1979	Battered	Edna Thompson	NBC TV movie
1979	The Champ	Dolly Kenyon	
1979	The Glove	Mrs. Fitzgerald	
1981	The Woman Inside	Aunt Coll	posthumous release; filmed in 1978

=== Short films ===
Year	Title	Notes
1929	Broadway's Like That	Vitaphone Varieties release 960 (December 1929); Cast: Ruth Etting, Humphrey Bogart, Mary Philips
1930	The Devil's Parade	Vitaphone Varieties release 992 (February 1930); Cast: Sidney Toler
1930	The Heart Breaker	Vitaphone Varieties release 1012–1013 (March 1930); Cast: Eddie Foy, Jr.
1930	An Intimate Dinner in Celebration of Warner Bros. Silver Jubilee	
1931	How I Play Golf, number 10, "Trouble Shots"	Vitaphone release 4801; Cast: Bobby Jones, Joe E. Brown, Edward G. Robinson, Douglas Fairbanks, Jr.
1933	Just Around the Corner	
1934	Hollywood Newsreel	
1941	Meet the Stars #2: Baby Stars	
1965	The Cincinnati Kid Plays According to Hoyle	

=== Television ===
Year	Title	Role	Notes
1961	The Untouchables	Hannah 'Lucy' Wagnall	Episode: "The Underground Court"
1963	The Virginian	Rosanna Dobie	Episode: "To Make This Place Remember"
1963	Wagon Train	Ma Bleecker	Episode: "The Bleecker Story"
1963	The Real McCoys	Aunt Winn	Season 6, Episodes 21 & 22
1964	The Twilight Zone	Phyllis Britt	Episode: "What's in the Box"
1964	Bonanza	Lillian Manfred	Episode: "The Pressure Game"
1965	Petticoat Junction	Florabelle Campbell	Season 5, Episode 22
1965	The Lucy Show	Joan Brenner	Episodes: "Lucy and Joan" & "Lucy the Stunt Man"
1965	My Three Sons	Harriet Blanchard	Episode: "Office Mother"
1968	Family Affair	Laura London	Episode: "Somebody Upstairs"
1968–1970	Here Come the Brides	Lottie Hatfield	52 episodes Nominated—Primetime Emmy Award for Outstanding Lead Actress in a Drama Series (1969–70)
1971	McCloud	Ernestine White	Episode: "Top of the World, Ma"
1971	Love American Style		Episode: "Love and the Love Sick Sailor/Love and the Mistress/Love and the Reincarnation/Love and the Sexy Survey"
1972–1973	Banyon	Peggy Revere	8 episodes
1973	The Rookies	Mrs. Louise Darrin	Episode: "Cry Wolf"
1976	Starsky & Hutch	Mrs Pruitt	Episode "The Las Vegas Strangler"
1978	The Love Boat	Ramona Bevans	Episode: "Ship of Ghouls"
1979	The Rebels	Mrs. Brumple	TV movie
1979	Fantasy Island	Naomi Gittings	Episode: Bowling; Command Performance, —TV movie

== Radio broadcasts ==
Year	Program	Episode/source
1946	Hollywood Star Time	

== Awards and nominations ==
Year	Organization	Work	Category	Result	Ref.
1952	Academy Awards	The Blue Veil	Best Supporting Actress	Nominated	
1958	Tony Awards	The Rope Dancers	Best Featured Actress in a Play	Nominated	
1960	Hollywood Walk of Fame	—N/a	Star – Motion Pictures	Won	
1965	National Board of Review	The Cincinnati Kid	Best Supporting Actress	Won	
1966	Golden Globe Awards	The Cincinnati Kid	Best Supporting Actress – Motion Picture	Nominated	
1969	Primetime Emmy Awards	Here Come the Brides	Outstanding Lead Actress in a Drama Series	Nominated	
1970	Primetime Emmy Awards	Here Come the Brides	Outstanding Lead Actress in a Drama Series	Nominated	
1978	Golden Globe Awards	Opening Night	Best Supporting Actress – Motion Picture	Nominated	
