= Glenda Farrell =

American actress (1904–1971)

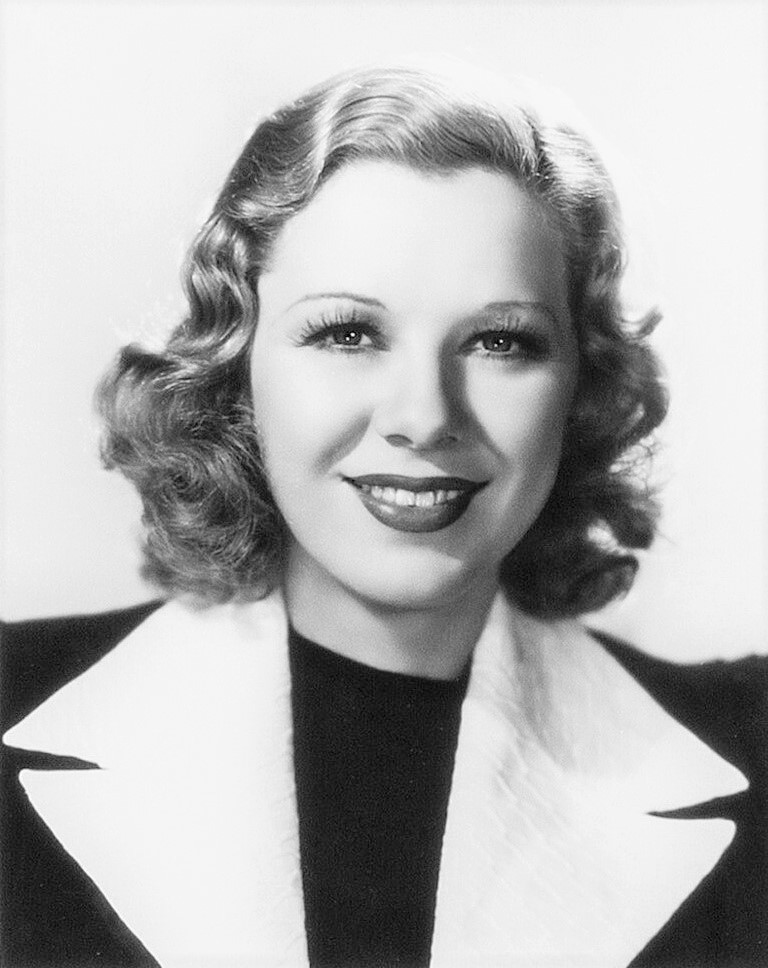
- Farrell in 1938
- Born: June 30, 1904 (Note: Some sources state Farrell's birth year as 1901, often citing the Social Security Death Index and US Census records; however, other sources state her birth year as 1904.); Enid, Oklahoma Territory, U.S.
- Died: May 1, 1971 (aged 66); New York City, U.S.
- Resting place: West Point Cemetery
- Occupation: Actress
- Years active: 1928–1970
- Spouses: Thomas Richards (m. 1921; div. 1929) Dr. Henry Ross (m. 1941)
- Children: Tommy Farrell

Glenda Farrell (June 30, 1904 – May 1, 1971) was an American actress. Farrell personified the smart and sassy, wisecracking blonde of the Classic Hollywood films. Her career spanned more than 50 years, and she appeared in numerous Broadway plays, films and television series. She won an Emmy Award in 1963 for Outstanding Supporting Actress for her performance as Martha Morrison in the medical drama television series Ben Casey.

Farrell began acting on stage as a child and continued with various theatre companies and on Broadway before signing with Warner Bros. A signature 1930s Warner Bros. star, Farrell appeared in films such as Little Caesar (1931), I Am a Fugitive from a Chain Gang (1932), Mystery of the Wax Museum (1933) and Lady for a Day (1933). After leaving Warner Bros. in 1939, Farrell remained active in film, television and theatre throughout the rest of her career.

== Early life ==
Farrell was born in Enid, Oklahoma. Her father, Charles Farrell, was a horse trader of Irish and Cherokee descent. Farrell's mother, Wilhelmina "Minnie" of German descent, was the driving force behind her daughter's theatre career. Farrell had two brothers, Dick and Gene. After her family moved to Wichita, Kansas, Farrell began acting on stage with a theatrical company at age seven, playing the role of Little Eva in the play Uncle Tom's Cabin. Farrell's mother, who had never achieved her own desire to be an actress, encouraged and supported her daughter's acting interests. When her family moved to San Diego, California, a teenage Farrell joined the Virginia Brissac Stock Company. Farrell made the third honor roll in Motion Picture Magazine's "Fame and Fortune Contest". Her picture and biography were featured in the magazine's April 1919 issue, which also stated that Farrell had some experience in the chorus, vaudeville, and camp entertainments. Farrell received a formal education at the Mount Carmel Catholic Academy.

== Career ==
=== 1928–1939: Stage and films ===
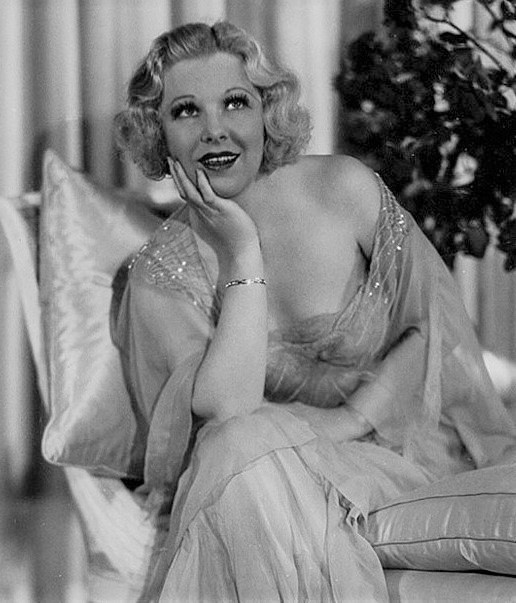
Farrell in Man's Castle (1933)

In 1928, Farrell was cast as the lead actress in the play The Spider and made her film debut in a minor role in Lucky Boy. Farrell moved to New York City in 1929, where she replaced Erin O'Brien-Moore as Marion Hardy in Aurania Rouverol's play Skidding. The play later served as the basis for the Andy Hardy film series. By April 1929, the Brooklyn Daily Eagle reported that she had played the role 355 times. Farrell appeared in several other plays, including Divided Honors, Recapture, and Love, Honor and Betray with George Brent, Alice Brady, and Clark Gable.

In 1930, she starred in the comedy short film The Lucky Break with Harry Fox and in July 1930, Film Daily announced that Farrell had been cast as the female lead, Olga Stassoff, in director Mervyn LeRoy's gangster film Little Caesar. The movie was Farrell's first major film role, co-starring Edward G. Robinson and Douglas Fairbanks Jr. Afterwards, she returned to Broadway and starred in On the Spot at the Forrest Theater. At the time, Farrell conceded that motion pictures offered immense salaries but felt the theatre was the foundation of the actor's profession. She appeared in several more plays.

In 1932, Farrell starred in the hit Broadway play Life Begins, an episodic drama set entirely in the maternity ward in a hospital. Farrell received rave reviews and notices for her performance as Florette Darien, the professionally sullen chorus girl. Farrell was asked to recreate the role in Warner Bros.' film adaptation of Life Begins later that year. She was also given a seven years contract with the Warner Bros. film studio. Farrell did not return to the stage until 1939.

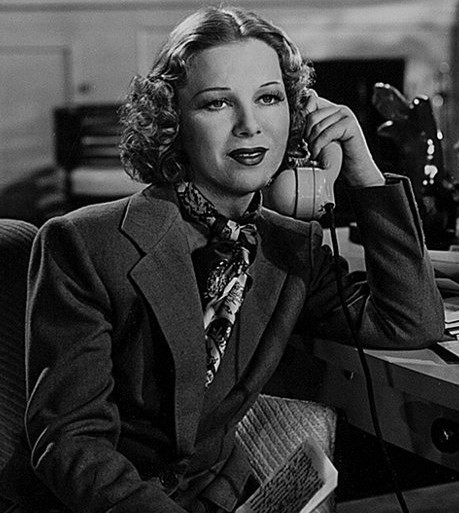
Farrell in Hollywood Hotel (1937)

Farrell appeared in over 30 films in her first five years with Warner Bros., sometimes working on three pictures that were shooting at the same time and managed to transition from one role to another. She co-starred in the Academy-Award nominated films I Am a Fugitive from a Chain Gang (1932) with Paul Muni and Lady for a Day (1933) by director Frank Capra. She also appeared in films such as Girl Missing (1933), Little Big Shot (1935), the musical Go into Your Dance (1935) and the comedies Nobody's Fool (1936) and High Tension (1936).

Farrell was close friends with fellow Warner Bros. actress and frequent co-star Joan Blondell. They were paired as a comedy duo throughout the early 1930s in a series of five Warner Bros. movies: Havana Widows (1933), Kansas City Princess (1934), Traveling Saleslady (1935), We're in the Money (1935) and Miss Pacific Fleet (1935). Farrell and Blondell appeared together in a total of nine films.

Farrell and Barton MacLane as Torchy Blane and Steve McBride

In 1937, Farrell began starring as Torchy Blane, a fast-talking, wisecracking newspaper reporter. Warner Bros. had started to develop a film adaptation of "MacBride and Kennedy" stories by detective novelist Frederick Nebel. For the film version, Kennedy is changed to a woman named "Torchy" Blane and is in love with MacBride's character. Director Frank MacDonald immediately knew whom he wanted for the role of Torchy. Farrell had already proved that she could play hard-boiled reporters in Mystery of the Wax Museum (1933) and Hi, Nellie! (1934) and was quickly cast with Barton MacLane playing detective Steve McBride in the first film Smart Blonde (1937).

Smart Blonde was a surprise hit and became a popular second feature with moviegoers. Farrell continued to play Torchy in seven films opposite MacLane between 1937 and 1939. The Torchy series took Farrell's popularity to a new level. She was beloved by the moviegoing public and received a huge amount of fan mail for the series. Farrell based her portrayal of the Torchy character on real-life female journalists of the time, stating in her 1969 Time interview: "So before I undertook to do the first Torchy, I determined to create a real human being—and not an exaggerated comedy type. I met those [newswomen] who visited Hollywood and watched them work on visits to New York City. They were generally young, intelligent, refined, and attractive. By making Torchy true to life, I tried to create a character practically unique in movies."

Along with starring in the Torchy Blane series, Farrell appeared in several other films, including Dance Charlie Dance (1937), Exposed (1938) and Prison Break (1938). She also performed in the radio series Vanity and Playhouse in 1937 and Manhattan Latin with Humphrey Bogart in 1938.

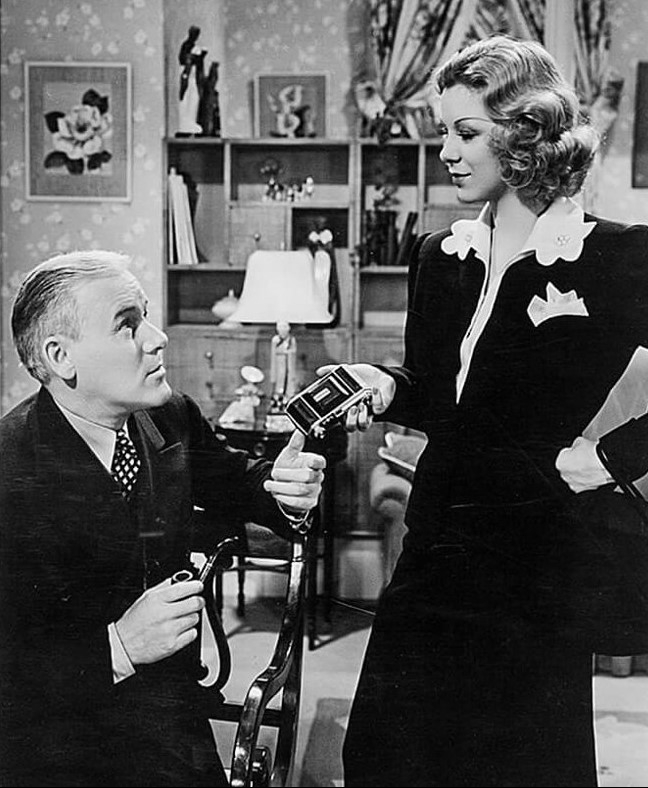
Farrell in the 1938 film Exposed with Charles D. Brown

Farrell was elected to a one-year term as the honorary mayor of North Hollywood in 1937, beating her competition Bing Crosby and Lewis Stone by a three-to-one margin. Even though it began as a Warner Bros. publicity stunt, Farrell took the job seriously, attending functions, presentations, and ceremonies. She was also put in charge when the North Hollywood Chamber of Commerce announced that it wanted to put sewers along Ventura Highway and started the groundwork for that project.

In 1939, Farrell left Warner Bros. when her contract expired. Several factors resulted in her decision, including feeling Warner Bros. was typecasting her as a newspaper reporter, a pay raise reneged on by Jack Warner, and a desire to return to the theatre. Farrell later told syndicated columnist Bob Thomas in 1952: "There's something more satisfying about working in a play. You get that immediate response from the audience, and you feel that your performance is your own. In pictures, you get frustrated because you feel you have no power over what you're doing."

=== 1939–1969: Television, stage, and films ===
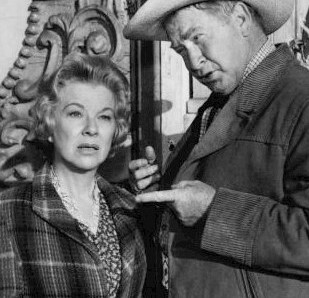
Farrell in 1962 with Chill Wills in the television series Frontier Circus

In July 1939, Farrell starred in the lead role in the play Anna Christie at the Westport Country Playhouse and followed that with a summer stock production of S. N. Behrman's play Brief Moment. She co-starred with Lyle Talbot and Alan Dinehart in the long-running play Separate Rooms at Broadway's Plymouth Theater for a successful 613-performance run throughout 1940 and 1941. She appeared in the Broadway plays The Overtons in 1945 and Home is the Hero by Walter Macken in 1954.

Farrell returned to motion pictures in 1941, starring in Mervyn LeRoy's film noir, Johnny Eager. Throughout the 40s, 50s, and 60s, Farrell continued to appear in numerous films: including the Academy Award-nominated film The Talk of the Town (1942), A Night for Crime (1943), the Western Apache War Smoke (1952) and the crime drama Girls in the Night (1953). She starred in the 1959 film adaptation of the Broadway play Middle of the Night with Fredric March and Kim Novak. Farrell co-starred with her son Tommy Farrell in two comedy films in 1964: Kissin' Cousins and The Disorderly Orderly.

Farrell made her television debut in 1949 in the anthology series The Chevrolet Tele-Theatre. She appeared in over 40 television series between 1950 and 1969, including Kraft Theatre, Studio One in Hollywood, The United States Steel Hour, Bonanza and Bewitched. In 1963, Farrell guest-starred in the ABC medical drama series Ben Casey as Martha Morrison in the two-part episode "A Cardinal Act of Mercy". She won the Primetime Emmy Award for outstanding performance in a supporting role by an actress.

Farrell briefly retired in 1968 but soon decided to return to acting. Farrell's final work in her long career was the Broadway play Forty Carats. She was appearing in Forty Carats at the Morosco Theatre until ill health forced her to leave the play a few months later. Farrell was eventually diagnosed with lung cancer.

== Personal life ==
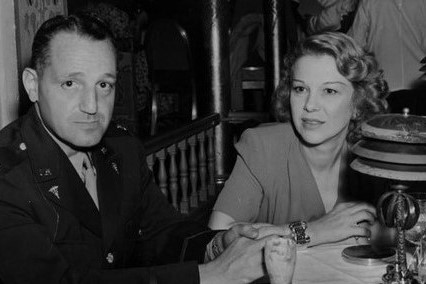
Farrell and her husband Dr. Henry Ross in 1942

In 1920, Farrell was hired to do a dance routine at a Navy benefit ball in San Diego. There she met her first husband, Thomas Richards. They were married from 1921 to 1929. Their son, actor Tommy Farrell, was born in 1921. Farrell was engaged to Jack Durant of the comedy duo "Mitchell and Durant" in 1931 but never married him. She later dated screenwriter Robert Riskin and actor Jack Randall.

In 1941, Farrell married Dr. Henry Ross, a major and Army Air Force flight surgeon. The couple met during a performance of the play Separate Rooms after Farrell sprained her ankle and was treated backstage by Ross. Ross was a staff surgeon at New York's Polyclinic Hospital and West Point graduate, who later served as chief of the public health section on General Eisenhower's staff. Farrell and Ross remained married until her death 30 years later. Throughout her life, Farrell was a devout Catholic.

== Death ==
In 1971, Farrell died from lung cancer, age 66, at her home in New York City and was interred in the West Point Cemetery in West Point, New York. When Ross, who did not remarry, died in 1991, he was buried with her.

== Legacy ==
Comic book writer Jerry Siegel credits Farrell's portrayal of Torchy Blane as the inspiration for the fictional Daily Planet reporter and Superman's love interest, Lois Lane. Siegel also named June Farrell, one of the characters in his Funnyman comic book series, after Farrell.

On February 8, 1960, Farrell received a star on the Hollywood Walk of Fame for her contribution to motion pictures at 6524 Hollywood Boulevard.

Writer and director Garson Kanin said in a 1971 New York Times article: "There are players who create characters; some of the great ones, a single character. More rare are those who, like Glenda, created a type. She invented and developed that made‐tough, uncompromising, knowing, wisecracking, undefeatable blonde. Whether she was the Girl Friend of the star, a cynical secretary, a salesgirl, a worldweary wife, a madam, homesteader, or schoolteacher she was always, relentlessly The Type. She was widely imitated, and lived long enough to see her imitators imitated."

In 1977, Farrell's husband, Dr. Henry Ross, donated 38 acres of land to the Putnam County Land Trust, establishing the Glenda Farrell–Henry Ross Preserve.

== Films ==
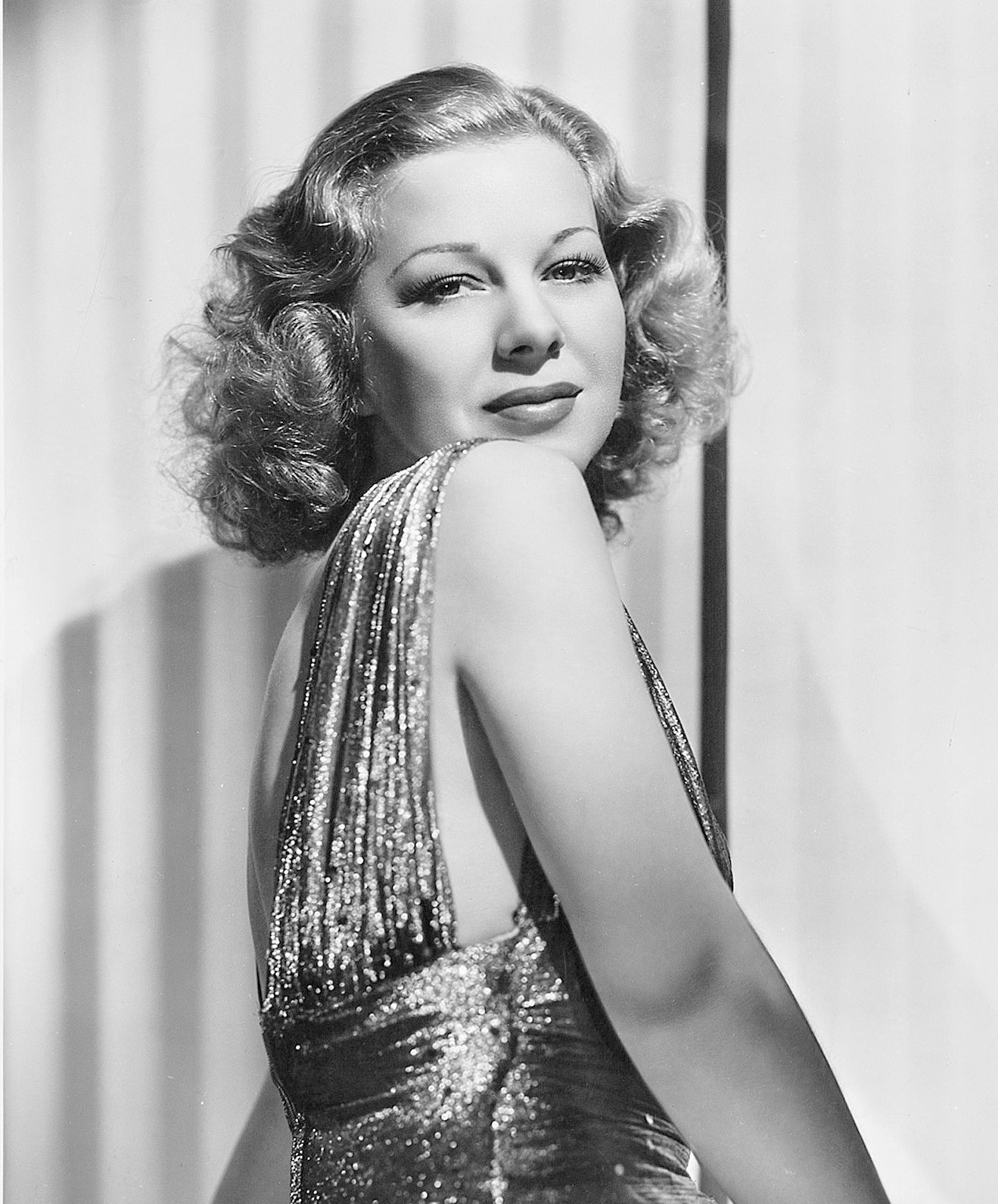
Farrell in Stolen Heaven (1938)

Year	Title	Role	Notes
1929	Lucky Boy		Uncredited
1930	The Lucky Break		Short
1931	Little Caesar	Olga Stassoff	
1932	Scandal for Sale	Stella	Uncredited
1932	Life Begins	Florette Darien	
1932	Three on a Match	Mrs. Black	
1932	I Am a Fugitive from a Chain Gang	Marie Woods	
1932	The Match King	Babe	
1933	Mystery of the Wax Museum	Florence Dempsey	
1933	Grand Slam	Blondie	
1933	Girl Missing	Kay Curtis	
1933	The Keyhole	Dot	
1933	How to Break 90 #2: Position and Back Swing	Golfer's Wife	Short, uncredited
1933	Gambling Ship	Jeanne Sands	
1933	Mary Stevens, M.D.	Glenda Carroll	
1933	Lady for a Day	Missouri Martin	
1933	Bureau of Missing Persons	Belle Howard Saunders	
1933	Havana Widows	Sadie Appleby	
1933	Man's Castle	Fay La Rue	
1934	The Big Shakedown	Lily "Lil" Duran	
1934	Hi Nellie!	Gerry Krale	
1934	Dark Hazard	Valerie "Val" Wilson	
1934	I've Got Your Number	Bonnie	
1934	Heat Lightning	Mrs. Tifton	
1934	Merry Wives of Reno	Bunny Fitch	
1934	The Personality Kid	Joan McCarty	
1934	Kansas City Princess	Marie Callahan	
1934	The Secret Bride	Hazel Normandie	
1935	Gold Diggers of 1935	Betty Hawes	
1935	Traveling Saleslady	Claudette	
1935	Go into Your Dance	Molly Howard	
1935	In Caliente	Clara	
1935	We're in the Money	Dixie Tilton	
1935	Little Big Shot	Jean	
1935	Miss Pacific Fleet	Mae O'Brien	
1936	Snowed Under	Daisy Lowell	
1936	The Law in Her Hands	Dorothy "Dot" Davis	
1936	Nobody's Fool	Ruby Miller	
1936	High Tension	Edith McNeil	
1936	Here Comes Carter	Verna Kennedy	
1936	Gold Diggers of 1937	Genevieve Larkin	
1937	Smart Blonde	Torchy Blane	
1937	Fly-Away Baby	Torchy Blane	
1937	Dance Charlie Dance	Fanny Morgan	
1937	You Live and Learn	Mamie Wallis	
1937	Sunday Night at the Trocadero	Herself	Short
1937	Breakfast for Two	Carol Wallace	
1937	The Adventurous Blonde	Torchy Blane	
1937	Hollywood Hotel	Jonesy	
1938	Blondes at Work	Torchy Blane	
1938	Stolen Heaven	Rita	
1938	Prison Break	Jean Fenderson	
1938	The Road to Reno	Sylvia Shane	
1938	Exposed	Click Stewart	
1938	Torchy Gets Her Man	Torchy Blane	
1939	Torchy Blane in Chinatown	Torchy Blane	
1939	Torchy Runs for Mayor	Torchy Blane	
1941	Johnny Eager	Mae Blythe	
1942	Twin Beds	Sonya Cherupin	
1942	The Talk of the Town	Regina Bush	
1943	City Without Men	Billie LaRue	
1943	A Night for Crime	Susan Cooper	
1943	Klondike Kate	Molly	
1944	Ever Since Venus	Babs Cartwright	
1947	Heading for Heaven	Nora Elkins	
1948	I Love Trouble	Hazel Bixby	
1948	Mary Lou	Winnie Winford	
1948	Lulu Belle	Molly Benson	
1952	Apache War Smoke	Fanny Webson	
1953	Girls in the Night	Alice Haynes	
1954	Secret of the Incas	Mrs. Winston	
1954	Susan Slept Here	Maude Snodgrass	
1955	The Girl in the Red Velvet Swing	Mrs. Nesbit	
1959	Middle of the Night	Mrs. Mueller	
1964	Kissin' Cousins	Ma Tatum	
1964	The Disorderly Orderly	Dr. Jean Howard	
1970	Tiger by the Tail	Sarah Harvey	(final film role)

== Television ==
Year	Title	Role	Notes
1949	The Chevrolet Tele-Theatre		Episode: "The Mirror and the Manicure"
1949-58	Studio One in Hollywood	Various	Episode: "June Moon"; Episode: "Miss Turner's Decision"; Episode: "The Other Place"; Episode: "The Edge of Truth"
1950	The Silver Theatre		Episode: "Gaudy Lady"
1951	Prudential Family Playhouse	Effie Flound	Episode: "Ruggles of Red Gap"
1951	Faith Baldwin Romance Theatre		Episode: "Fountain of Youth"
1951	Starlight Theatre	Dorine	Episode: "The Come-Back"
1952	Personal Appearance Theater	Christopher Cross	Episode: "Adventure of Christopher Cross"
1952-53	Armstrong Circle Theatre	Serena Price	Episode: "The Darkroom"; Episode: "The Straight and Narrow"
1953	Tales of Tomorrow		Episode: "The Build-Box"
1955	Justice		Episode: "House of Hatred"
1955	The Elgin Hour	Mrs. Dane	Episode: "Crime in the Streets"
1955	Goodyear Playhouse	Mrs. Davis	Episode: "The Expendable House"
1956	Front Row Center	May Cooper	Episode: "Uncle Barney"
1956	The Alcoa Hour	Eloise Schroeder	Episode: "Doll Face"
1956	The Kaiser Aluminum Hour		Episode: "Cracker Money"
1956-57	Kraft Theatre	Alma Wilkes / Stella Harvey / Momma	Episode: "Home Is the Hero"; Episode: "The Man on Roller Skates"; Episode: "The Last Showdown"; Episode: "The Old Ticker"; Episode: "Polka"
1957	The 20th Century-Fox Hour	Mae Swasey	Episode: "The Marriage Broker"
1957	The Sheriff of Cochise	Sarah Avery	Episode: "Federal Witness"
1958	Matinee Theatre		Episode: "The Hickory Heart"
1958	Cimarron City	Maggie Arkins	Episode: "A Respectable Girl"
1959	The Further Adventures of Ellery Queen		Episode: "Confession of Murder"
1959	General Electric Theater	Mrs. Brady	Episode: "Night Club"
1959	The Bells of St. Mary's		Television film
1959	Buick-Electra Playhouse	Landlady	Episode: "The Killers"
1959	Wagon Train	Belle MacAbee	Episode: "The Jess MacAbee Story"
1960	Play of the Week	Rose Frobisher	Episode: "A Palm Tree in a Rose Garden"
1960	The Islanders	Mrs. Dan King	Episode: "The Widow from Richmond"
1960-63	The United States Steel Hour	Various	Episode: "Queen of the Orange Bowl"; Episode: "Summer Rhapsody"; Episode: "The Woman Across the Hall; Episode: "The Inner Panic"; Episode: "Moment of Rage"
1961	Our American Heritage	Martha Bulloch Roosevelt	Episode: "The Invincible Teddy"
1961	A String of Beads		Television film
1961	Westinghouse Playhouse	Laura	Episode: "A Tale of Two Mothers"
1961	Special for Women: The Glamour Trap	Beauty Operator	Television film
1962	Frontier Circus	Ma Jukes	Episode: "Mighty Like Rogues"
1962	The Defenders	Edna Holley	Episode: "The Naked Heiress"
1962	Route 66	Laverne	Episode: "Man Out of Time"
1963	Ben Casey	Martha Morrison	Episode: "A Cardinal Act of Mercy" part 1 Episode: "A Cardinal Act of Mercy" part 2 Won the Emmy Award for outstanding Performance in a Supporting Role by an Actress
1963	Rawhide	Elizabeth Farragut	Episode: "Incident at Farragut Pass"
1963	Dr. Kildare	Vera Dennis	Episode: "The Exploiters"
1963	The Fugitive	Maggie Lambert	Episode: "Fatso"
1964	Bonanza	Lulabelle "Looney" Watkins	Episode: "The Pure Truth"
1964	The Bing Crosby Show	Aunt Lulu	Episode: "The Liberated Woman"
1968	Felony Squad	Jeanette Anderson	Episode: "The Deadly Innocents"
1969	Bewitched	Hortense Rockeford	Episode: "The Battle of Burning Oak"
