= Manuel Seff =

American dramatist

- Born: June 6, 1895; Baltimore, Maryland, United States
- Died: September 22, 1969 (aged 74); New York, New York; United States
- Occupation: Screenwriter
- Years active: 1932–1950 (film)

Manuel Seff (1895–1969) was an American playwright and screenwriter.

== Selected filmography ==
- Terror Aboard (1933)
- The Girl in 419 (1933)
- Footlight Parade (1933)
- Easy to Love (1934)
- Gold Diggers of 1935 (1935)
- Traveling Saleslady (1935)
- A Night at the Ritz (1935)
- Trouble for Two (1936)
- Kansas City Kitty (1944)
- Sailor's Holiday (1944)
- Louisiana Hayride (1944)
- Hitchhike to Happiness (1945)
- The Falcon's Alibi (1946)
- Unmasked (1950)

== Bibliography ==
- Balio, Tino. Grand Design: Hollywood as a Modern Business Enterprise, 1930-1939. University of California Press, 1995.
