= I've Got Your Number (film) =

1934 film by Ray Enright

- Movie poster
- Directed by: Ray Enright
- Screenplay by: Warren Duff; Sidney Sutherland
- Story by: William Rankin
- Produced by: Sam Bischoff
- Starring: Joan Blondell; Pat O'Brien; Allen Jenkins; Glenda Farrell
- Cinematography: Arthur L. Todd
- Edited by: Clarence Kolster
- Music by: Bernhard Kaun
- Distributed by: Warner Bros. Pictures
- Release date: February 24, 1934
- Running time: 69 minutes
- Country: United States
- Language: English

I've Got Your Number is a 1934 American Pre-Code romantic comedy film directed by Ray Enright and starring Joan Blondell, Pat O'Brien, Allen Jenkins and Glenda Farrell. The film was released by Warner Bros. Pictures on February 24, 1934. Two telephone repairmen romance a pair of blondes with many adventures. The supporting cast features Eugene Pallette.

== Plot ==
Switchboard operator Marie Lawson is conned by admirer Nicky, who tells her it is just a practical joke, into redirecting a phone call. However, Nicky uses what he learns to his own benefit, costing the intended recipient a lot of money. When the victim complains to Marie's boss, telephone repairmen Terry Riley and John are called in to see if the phone was tapped. When it is found not to be, Marie loses her job.

Terry is attracted to Marie and eventually talks her into a date. He also gets her hired by businessman John P. Schuyler, whom he had earlier saved from a live electrical wire.

When Marie runs into Nicky later, she lets slip that her new employer is expecting a delivery of $90,000 in bonds. As a result, Nicky is able to fool the courier into thinking he is Schuyler and giving him the bonds while Marie is distracted by a flood of calls from his accomplices. When she realizes what has happened, she goes looking for Nicky, but this only serves to make her look guilty. Terry is questioned by the police and then released so he can lead them to her hiding place. It works and she is arrested.

When an expensive lawyer shows up on her behalf, Terry becomes suspicious and taps his line with John's reluctant help. Finally, he is able to trace a call to where Nicky and his gang are hiding out. When he goes there, he is easily caught and placed in a bedroom after the phone is ripped out. However, he is not searched. He hooks up a spare phone he has and is able to contact John to bring help. The crooks are captured.

Terry and Marie get married, but on their wedding night, many of Terry's co-workers show up to "repair" their phone.

== Cast ==
- Joan Blondell as Marie Lawson
- Pat O'Brien as Terry Riley
- Allen Jenkins as John 'Johnny'
- Glenda Farrell as Bonnie (Madame Francis)
- Eugene Pallette as Joseph 'Joe' Flood
- Gordon Westcott as Nicky
- Henry O'Neill as Mr. John P. Schuyler
- Hobart Cavanaugh as Happy Dooley
- Louise Beavers as Crystal

== Production ==
The film's prerelease title was Hell's Bells. Ben Markson was originally assigned to the screenplay. A scene between Joan Blondell and Pat O'Brien was filmed at her home because Blondell, who was recovering from an emergency appendectomy, was not allowed to travel to the film studio by her physician.

== Reception ==
The New York Times movie review said: "I've Got Your Number deals with the inside workings of the telephone service. More particularly, it dramatizes the spectacular careers of a pair of ribald "trouble shooters" or repair men, who roam the city with picturesque irreverence and pry into its diverting kaleidoscope of humor and drama. A reasonably hilarious product of the wise-crack school, it is fast and hearty without setting any new records for wit. Pat O'Brien can make a line sound funnier than it really is by the racy and crisp style of his delivery, and in the Roxy's new film he improves the dialogue considerably."

== Home media ==
Warner Archive released a double feature DVD collection of I've Got Your Number (1934) and Havana Widows (1933) on December 13, 2011.
