= More of Bobby's Greatest Hits =

Greatest hits album by Bobby Vinton
- Released: 1966
- Genre: Pop
- Label: Epic
- Producer: Bob Morgan and Billy Sherrill

Bobby Vinton chronology
Bobby Vinton Sings Satin Pillows and Careless (1966)	More of Bobby's Greatest Hits (1966)	Country Boy (1966)

Singles from More of Bobby's Greatest Hits
- 1. "Clinging Vine" Released: July 24, 1964; 2. "What Color (Is a Man?)" Released: August 23, 1965; 3. "Tears" Released: January 28, 1966; 4. "Dum-De-Da" Released: April 1, 1966

More of Bobby's Greatest Hits is Bobby Vinton's second compilation of tracks from singles from 1964–1966. Nine of the ten tracks previously charted on the Billboard Hot 100, the lone exception being "Careless" which "bubbled under" (although it reached #82 on the competing Cashbox charts). The hits "Clinging Vine", "What Color (Is a Man)", "Dum-De-Da" and "Tears" (previously a hit for Ken Dodd) make their album debut on this compilation.

== Track listing ==
Side 1
No.	Title	Writer(s)	Original album	Length
1.	"Dum-De-Da"	Merle Kilgore, Margie Singleton	Epic single 10014	2:01
2.	"L-O-N-E-L-Y"	Bobby Vinton	Bobby Vinton Sings for Lonely Nights	2:24
3.	"Satin Pillows"	Robert Tubert, Sonny James	Bobby Vinton Sings Satin Pillows and Careless	2:26
4.	"Long Lonely Nights"	Lee Andrews, Bernice Davis, D.T. Henderson, Mimi Uniman	Bobby Vinton Sings for Lonely Nights	2:27
5.	"Clinging Vine"	Earl Shuman, Leon Carr, Gary Lane	Epic single 9705	2:27

Side 2
No.	Title	Writer(s)	Original album	Length
1.	"What Color (Is a Man)"	Marge Barton	Epic single 9846	1:56
2.	"Tears"	William Uhr, Frank Capano	Epic single 9894	2:25
3.	"Careless"	Lew Quadling, Dick Jurgens, Eddy Howard	Bobby Vinton Sings Satin Pillows and Careless	2:14
4.	"Theme from "Harlow" (Lonely Girl)" (From the Original Sound Track of the Joseph E. Levine Presentation "Harlow")	Jay Livingston, Ray Evans, Neal Hefti	Drive-In Movie Time	2:19
5.	"Petticoat White (Summer Sky Blue)"	Doc Pomus, Mort Shuman	Bobby Vinton Sings Satin Pillows and Careless	2:20

== Personnel ==
- Bob Morgan – producer
- Billy Sherrill – producer
- Sid Maurer – cover painting

== Charts ==
Singles – Billboard (North America)

Year	Single	Chart	Position
1964	"Clinging Vine"	The Billboard Hot 100	17
1964	"Clinging Vine"	Billboard Adult Contemporary	2
1965	"What Color (Is a Man)"	The Billboard Hot 100	38
1965	"What Color (Is a Man)"	Billboard Adult Contemporary	7
1966	"Dum-De-Da"	The Billboard Hot 100	40
1966	"Tears"	The Billboard Hot 100	59
