= Painting the Clouds with Sunshine =

1929 song

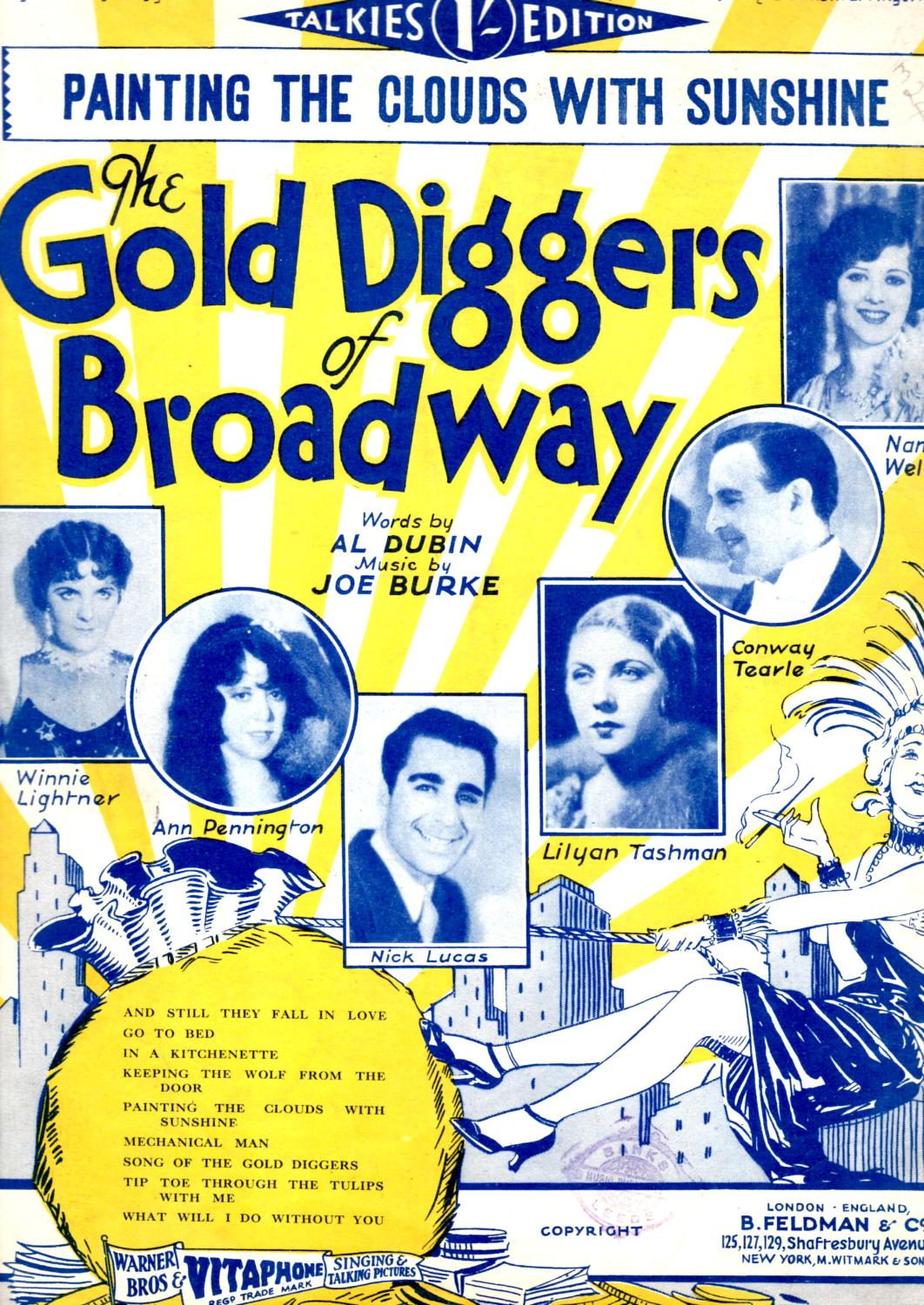
British sheet music cover, 1929

"Painting the Clouds with Sunshine" is a popular song published in 1929. The music was written by Joe Burke and the lyrics by Al Dubin for the 1929 musical film Gold Diggers of Broadway when it was sung by Nick Lucas. Gold Diggers of Broadway is a partially lost film, and the scenes featuring the song only have nearly 4 seconds of film left.

The 1951 film Painting the Clouds with Sunshine, a remake of Gold Diggers of Broadway, is named after the song, and features Dennis Morgan and Lucille Norman singing it. The song enjoyed fresh popularity following the release of the film.

Most recently the song was featured in the Netflix Original Jupiter's Legacy. The version featured was the one recorded by Jean Goldkette.

== Recorded versions ==
Hit versions in 1929 as assessed by Joel Whitburn were by:

- Nick Lucas
- Jean Goldkette Orchestra (vocal refrain by Frank Munn)
- Sammy Fain

=== Some other cover versions ===
- 1929 Billy Murray and Walter Scanlan – recorded for Edison Records (catalog No. 52619-R).
- 1929 Ambrose (vocal by Lou Abelardo) – included in the compilation album The Hottest of the Decca 'M' Series (1929-1930) (1999).
- 1929 Jack Hylton and His Orchestra (Vocal by Sam Browne) – recorded for His Master's Voice Records in the UK (catalog No. HMV B-5722).
- 1929 Johnny Marvin – recorded for Victor Records (catalog No. 22113B).
- 1929 Benjamin Franklin Hotel Dance Orchestra. Recorded for Perfect Records (catalog No. 15196B).
- 1951 Bing Crosby sang it on his radio show on two occasions in 1951 and 1952.
- 1951 Martha Tilton – recorded for Coral Records (catalogue No. 60585).
- 1951 Dennis Morgan and Lucille Norman, (duet in the musical), 1951 Cast Album, Capitol L-291, Orchestra and Chorus conducted by George Greeley
- 1951 Jan Garber – recorded for Capitol Records (catalog No. 1852).
- 1950s Johnny Brandon – included in the album Then and Now (2005).
- 1960 Russ Conway – included in his album Party Time.
- 1972 Venezuelan Clown/Children's Comedian "Popy" (Diony López) records a spanish-sung version of this song, under the title "Todo el cielo de luz se llena" (The whole Sky gets filled with light), included in his debut album "Popy".
- 2009 Twiggy – included in her album Gotta Sing Gotta Dance.
