= Bobby Vinton Sings for Lonely Nights =

Studio album by Bobby Vinton
- Released: June 1965
- Genre: Pop
- Length: 31:02
- Label: Epic
- Producer: Bob Morgan

Bobby Vinton chronology
Mr. Lonely (1964)	Bobby Vinton Sings for Lonely Nights (1965)	Drive-In Movie Time (1965)

Bobby Vinton Sings for Lonely Nights is Bobby Vinton's eleventh studio album, released in 1965. This album was released to capitalize on the success of Vinton's big hit "Mr. Lonely" and his album of the same name by containing only songs that refer to loneliness. There were two singles from this album: "Long Lonely Nights" (previously a minor hit for Lee Andrews & the Hearts then for Clyde McPhatter in 1957 and then for The Four Seasons in 1964) and Vinton's self-penned "L-O-N-E-L-Y". Cover versions include "Saturday Night (Is the Loneliest Night of the Week)", "All Alone Am I", "Oh, How I Miss You Tonight", "In the Still of the Night", "I'll Walk Alone" and "Have You Ever Been Lonely (Have You Ever Been Blue?)".

== Track listing ==
Side 1
No.	Title	Writer(s)	Length
1.	"Saturday Night (Is the Loneliest Night of the Week)"	Sammy Cahn, Jule Styne	2:31
2.	"All Alone Am I"	Arthur Altman, Joann Ioannidis, Manos Hadjidakis	2:45
3.	"Oh, How I Miss You Tonight"	Benny Davis, Joe Burke, Mark Fisher	2:31
4.	"In the Still of the Night"	Cole Porter	2:40
5.	"Hello Loneliness"	Robert Allen	2:48
6.	"So Many Lonely Girls"	Lee Morris, Bobby Vinton	2:24

Side 2
No.	Title	Writer(s)	Length
1.	"L-O-N-E-L-Y"	Bobby Vinton	2:23
2.	"I'll Walk Alone"	Sammy Cahn, Jule Styne	2:26
3.	"Have You Ever Been Lonely (Have You Ever Been Blue?)"	George "Funky" Brown, Peter de Rose	2:08
4.	"Long Lonely Nights"	Lee Andrews, Bernice Davis, D.T. Henderson, Mimi Uniman	2:25
5.	"Night Life"	Willie Nelson, Paul Buskirk, Walt Breeland	2:53
6.	"Lonely Street"	Carl Belew, W.S. Stevenson, Kenny Sowder	3:08

== Personnel ==
- Bob Morgan – producer
- Cardell – cover photo

== Charts ==
Chart performance for Bobby Vinton Sings for Lonely Nights
Chart (1965)	Peak position
US Billboard 200	116

Chart performance for singles from Bobby Vinton Sings for Lonely Nights
Single (1965)	Chart	Position
"Long Lonely Nights"	US Billboard Hot 100	17
"Long Lonely Nights"	US Adult Contemporary (Billboard)	5
"L-O-N-E-L-Y"	US Billboard Hot 100	22
"L-O-N-E-L-Y"	US Adult Contemporary (Billboard)	7
