= George Greeley =

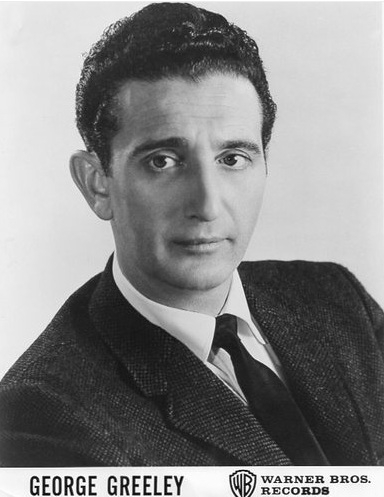

Background information
- Born: Georgio Guariglia; July 23, 1917; Westerly, Rhode Island, US
- Died: May 26, 2007 (aged 89) Los Angeles, US
- Genres: Easy listening, Jazz, Classical, Film score, Musical, Soundtrack, Electronic
- Occupations: Pianist, Conductor, Composer, Arranger
- Instruments: Piano, harpsichord, mandolin
- Years active: 1940s - 1980s
- Labels: Capitol Records, Warner Brothers, Reprise, RCA, La-La Land Records

George Greeley (born Georgio Guariglia; July 23, 1917 – May 26, 2007) was an Italian-American pianist, conductor, composer, arranger, recording artist and record producer who is known for his extensive work across the spectrum of the entertainment industry. Starting as an arranger and pianist with several notable big bands in the 1940s, he segued into the Hollywood radio scene, working on several nationally broadcast variety programs. After conducting an Army Air Force Band during World War II, he was hired by Columbia Pictures as a staff pianist and orchestrator. He worked as pianist on several hundred motion pictures, worked with many famous composers orchestrating their soundtrack compositions, and created original compositions of his own in several dozen movies. It was Greeley's hands that performed the piano parts that Tyrone Power mimed in The Eddy Duchin Story. Concurrent with his work at Columbia Pictures, George Greeley also worked at Capitol Records as music director, pianist, and conductor for many artists such as Gordon MacRae, Jane Powell, Jo Stafford, Frankie Laine, and Doris Day. He was hired in the late 1950s by the newly established Warner Brothers Records. George Greeley arranged, orchestrated and performed as primary artist for a series of hit recordings entitled "Popular Piano Concertos." As music tastes changed in the late 1960s, Greeley had already moved into television, composing themes and music for popular TV series like My Favorite Martian, The Ghost and Mrs. Muir, Nanny and the Professor, and Small Wonder. He performed as featured piano soloist and as guest conductor in concert appearances around the world. He died from emphysema at age 89 in Los Angeles, California.

== Early life and education ==
Greeley was born Giorgio Guariglia in Westerly, Rhode Island on 23 July 1917, soon after his family emigrated from Italy. Most of the family's members were musically gifted and could play many instruments. His father, James, had three music schools and a traveling orchestra. Georgio was taught to read music at an early age and was playing piano and mandolin when he was five. He often played four-handed piano pieces with his father, and they gave father-son recitals. He studied music at Columbia University, where he met and formed a long-time friendship with composer/arranger/bandleader Paul Weston, with whom Greeley worked in later years at Capitol Records and Columbia Records. Greeley won a scholarship to the Juilliard School in New York, where he studied piano and composition, graduating in 1939. He also studied music at the University of Southern California, and studied composition privately with Ernst Toch.

== Early career with the big bands ==
George Greeley entered the music business after meeting Sy Oliver, Duke Ellington's arranger. Oliver taught him the art of arranging for big bands, and Greeley began his career arranging music for several popular figures such as Tommy Dorsey, Glen Gray, Abe Lyman, Leo Reisman, and Kay Kyser. He joined the Tommy Dorsey Orchestra as pianist on the same day that Frank Sinatra became the band's new vocalist in January 1940. After about a year with Dorsey, Greeley defected to Abe Lyman because "the money was better, and Abe had me writing three arrangements a week. I'd studied composition and orchestration at Juilliard, and wanted to practice what I'd learned." Greeley then spent time during World War II conducting a U.S. Air Force band at the Santa Ana, California Army Air Base. He also became involved in the Hollywood radio scene, working as arranger on several nationally broadcast variety programs.

== Work at Columbia Pictures ==
A virtuoso trumpet player that Greeley had met in the Air Corps (Mannie Klein) helped arrange an audition with Columbia Pictures..(successful), and Greeley went to work there as staff pianist and orchestrator. As orchestrator, Greeley would fill out the sketches supplied by composers that included Max Steiner, Mario Castelnuovo-Tedesco, Leonard Bernstein, and Dimitri Tiomkin. As pianist, he performed on about two hundred motion pictures, including Picnic and The Eddy Duchin Story. He also worked as a composer. IMDb lists some twenty movies between 1949 and 1960 for which George Greeley is credited as composer of original music, including the 1957 film Hellcats of the Navy starring Ronald Reagan and Nancy Davis, Good Day For a Hanging, and The Guns of Fort Petticoat, starring Audie Murphy. Several films of which Greeley was especially proud included working as pianist on the Leonard Bernstein score for the 1954 drama On the Waterfront; and coaching Tyrone Power for The Eddy Duchin Story. In addition to performing the soundtrack songs when Eddy Duchin played (uncredited), it was Greeley's hands that performed the piano parts which Power mimed during filming.

== Recording artist and conductor ==
Concurrent with his work at Columbia Pictures, Greeley worked for Capitol Records, where he was a music director, arranger, and conductor for various artists including Gordon MacRae, Dean Martin, Ella Logan, Tony Martin, Dorothy Warenskjold, Jane Powell, Jane Froman, and Keely Smith. At the behest of his friend Paul Weston, Greeley also played piano (and harpsichord) on recording sessions for acts including Frankie Laine, Jo Stafford, Hoagy Carmichael, Sarah Vaughan, Eartha Kitt, and Doris Day. Many of those recordings have been now re-mastered and re-issued as CDs.

George Greeley was among the earliest artists signed to the Warner Bros. Records label when it was founded in the late 1950s, and he was instrumental in providing that company with the same elegant instrumental pop sounds that Billy Vaughn brought to Dot Records and Percy Faith brought to Columbia Records. As a recording artist for Warner Bros. Records, Greeley produced and performed as pianist (and occasionally as conductor) on fourteen popular albums between 1957 and 1967. His first album, The World's Greatest Popular Piano Concertos became Warner Bros. biggest hit to date, and Greeley's subsequent recordings were also hits for the label. Regarding the use of the phrase "Piano Concertos," Greeley stated that he hated the term, but Jim Conkling, the boss of the new Warner Bros. Records felt that the term sounded classy. The musicians performing with Greeley were an all-star collection of free lancers billed for publicity's sake as the "Warner Bros. Orchestra." Greeley said "because I was playing piano, I called some of my friends to come and conduct." Those friends included Felix Slatkin, Harry Bluestone, Ray Heindorf, and Ted Dale. Greeley's 1961 album for Warner Bros. Records, The Best of the Popular Piano Concertos, peaked at number 29 on the Billboard 200. On loan to Dot Records, he also ghost-conducted albums by Billy Vaughn and Lawrence Welk. Greeley's stint at Warner Brothers ended as times and popular tastes changed. He was let go by Mike Maitland who had succeeded Jim Conklin as label president. Ironically he was personally signed to the Reprise label by his old friend and bandmate, Frank Sinatra. Even more ironic, Sinatra sold the label to Warner Bros., and Greeley was trimmed once more. Never on the street, Greeley had already begun working in television and more success were to come...in television and concerts across the country.

== Television work ==
Moving into television (between the 1960s and 1985), he composed the theme and background music for several popular TV series including My Favorite Martian starring Ray Walston and Bill Bixby, My Living Doll starring Robert Cummings and Julie Newmar, The Ghost and Mrs. Muir, Nanny and the Professor, and Small Wonder (1985).

Greeley's theme for My Favorite Martian (1963–66) is notable as one of the first uses of an electronic instrument in a television theme and prominently features an electro-theremin, played by Paul Tanner, co-creator of the instrument, who was at the time the lead trombonist for the ABC Orchestra. The electro-theremin was also regularly used as a sound effect when Walston's character Uncle Martin raised his antennae or used his powers of levitation.

== Concert appearances ==
In addition to his film and TV work, Greeley performed as a piano soloist and guest conductor in Montreal, Korea, and Rio de Janeiro. In 1957 he did an extensive concert tour of South America, and conducted the Argentine Symphony in Buenos Aires. Greeley participated in six television variety shows when touring in Australia. In the States, among his televised concert appearances, Greeley was guest pianist on Chicago's WGN-TV series titled "Great Music From Chicago." In 1962 Greeley appeared as piano soloist with Robert Trendler conducting a program of American music. Then, appearing on the same series as piano soloist with the Chicago Symphony Orchestra in 1964, he performed Aram Khachaturian's "Sabre Dance," Ferde Grofe's "On the Trail" from his Grand Canyon Suite, and other works. In 1975 Greeley performed as guest pianist with the Boston Pops Orchestra, playing George Gershwin's Concerto in F under Arthur Fiedler's baton. George Greeley also performed as guest pianist with the Atlanta Symphony Orchestra. At the time of Greeley's death, Jon Burlingame. who was a USC professor teaching a class on the history of film scoring, stated that Greeley was an "extraordinary pianist".

== Personal life ==
Details about Greeley's first marriage are unknown. His marriage to Jan Clayton (1966–68) ended in divorce. Greeley died from emphysema at West Hills Hospital and Medical Center in Los Angeles on 26 May 2007, aged 89. He was survived by his sister, Louise Wheeler, a brother Herbert, his two sons, Anthony and Edward; and by his long-time companion, actress Teri York.

== Discography ==
=== Capitol Records recordings LP and EP box sets ===
In the 1950s it was common practice for some Capitol recordings to be published in both the LP format (10-inch and 12-inch) and in the EP box set format (FBF). Some LPs were also still being issued on 78 RPM discs (e.g. With a Song in My Heart). During the 1950s, many recordings listed as "soundtracks" were actually studio recordings, as the film music was not yet released separately from the film. Many of these recordings have been remastered and reissued as CDs. EPs are shown separately when not a box set.

A few Columbia Records recordings are listed here because ownership and labels changed for some artists in the late 1950s, and because Greeley worked for Columbia Pictures.

- 1950 – Paul Weston Conducts Chopin, Debussey, Ravel – Paul Weston Conductor – George Greeley Piano – Capitol CC-184 (10-inch LP) & Capitol FBF-184 (2-EP box set)
- 1951 – Painting the Clouds with Sunshine – Dennis Morgan, Lucille Norman – Chorus and Orchestra Conducted by George Greeley – Capitol L-291 (10-inch LP), also FBF-291 (4x45rpm box set)
- 1952 – With a Song in My Heart (Soundtrack) – Jane Froman – Chorus and Orchestra Conducted by George Greeley – Capitol L-309 (10-inch LP) [Also DDN-309, 4-record 78 rpm box set; KDF-309 4-record 45 rpm singles box set; and FBF-309 2-EP box set] This album was the Best-selling album of 1952, and spent 25 weeks at the top of the Billboard chart. [Reissued as L-309 in 1955 as 12-inch LP with 12 songs; reissued in 1968 with 10 songs as M-11891. Re-issued in 1996 as CD with 20 Jane Froman songs; re-ssued in 2000 as split-release CD with Jane Froman songs from her Pal Joey soundtrack album.]
- 1952 – Roberta – Gordon MacRae, Lucille Norman, Anne Triola – Chorus and Orchestra Conducted by George Greeley – Capitol L-334 (10-inch LP); DDN-334 (4 × 78 rpm); & Capitol FBF-334 (2-EP box set)
- 1952 – The Merry Widow – Gordon MacRae, Lucille Norman – Chorus and Orchestra Conducted by George Greeley – Capitol L-335 (10-inch LP) & Capitol FBF-335 (2-EP box set)
- 1952 – The Desert Song – Gordon MacRae, Lucille Norman, Bob Sands – Chorus and Orchestra Conducted by George Greeley – Capitol L-351 (10-inch LP) & Capitol FBF-351 (2-EP box set);(The Desert Song charted # 10 for one week) Issued in UK as Capitol (EMI) LC-6606. Issued in Australia as F-351 (2-EP box set)
- 1953 – The Desert Song / Roberta – Gordon MacRae, Lucille Norman – Chorus and Orchestra Conducted by George Greeley – Capitol P-384 (LP) [Also released in 1956 as T-384]
- 1953 – The Student Prince – Gordon MacRae, Harry Stanton, Dorothy Warenskjold – Chorus and Orchestra Conducted by George Greeley – Capitol L-407 & Capitol FBF-407 (2-EP box set); Reissued in the UK in 1968
- 1953 – Three Sailors and a Girl (Soundtrack) – Gordon MacRae, Jane Powell – George Greeley Conductor and Arranger – Capitol L-485 (10-inch LP) & FBF-485 (2-EP box set) Released on CD in 2006.
- 1953 – Piano Demitasse – George Greeley, Piano – Capitol H-438 (LP) and Capitol FBF-438 (2-EP box set)
- 1953 – Piano Demitasse: George Greeley At the Piano – Capitol LC-6614 (10-inch LP) (Issued in England)
- 1954 – Naughty Marietta – Gordon MacRae, Marguerite Piazza – Chorus and Orchestra Conducted by George Greeley – Capitol L-468 (LP) & Capitol FBF-468 (2-EP box set) Released in Australia as Capitol CLC-030 (LP).
- 1954 – Songs by Grieg and Dvorak – Dorothy Warenskjold – George Greeley Conducting the Concert Arts Orchestra – Capitol P-8247 (12-inch LP, Stereo).
- 1954 – Ella Logan Sings Favorites from Finian's Rainbow – Accompanied by George Greeley – Capitol H-561; Capitol/EMI (Australia) L-561 (10-inch LP) [One source says recorded in 1954, released in 1955].
- 1955 – The Student Prince / The Merry Widow – Gordon MacRae – Chorus and Orchestra conducted by George Greeley – Capitol T-437 (LP)
- 1955 – Naughty Marietta / The Red Mill – Gordon MacRae – Chorus and Orchestra conducted by George Greeley – Capitol T-551 (LP) (Carmen Dragon conducted The Red Mill)
- 1955 – Love Songs Italiane – Tony Romano – George Greeley Conductor – Capitol H-478 (10-inch LP) & Capitol EAP-478 (2-EP box set) [Also issued in UK as LC-6688 & Capitol/EMI (Australia) H-478 (both 10-inch LPs); reissued in 2013 as CD (Various releases section)]
- 1956 – The Eddy Duchin Story (Soundtrack) – Orchestra Conducted by Harry Geller – George Greeley and Harry Sukman, pianists – Capitol L-716 (LP)
- 1956 – Melodia Imortal:The Eddy Duchin Story (Soundtrack) – Orchestra Conducted by Harry Geller – George Greeley and Harry Sukman, pianists – Capitol T-716 (Brazil)
- 1956 – Tu Seras un Homme, Mon Fils:(The Eddy Duchin Story) (Soundtrack) – Orchestra Conducted by Harry Geller – George Greeley and Harry Sukman, pianists – Capitol T-716 (France)

Capitol 7-inch singles and EP

- 1950 – "Chopin's Prelude Op.28 No. 4 in E-minor" – Paul Weston and His Orchestra – George Greeley, Piano – Capitol-687 (from 1950 LP)
- 1950 – "Sometime" / "No Other Love" (Chopin adaptation) – Jo Stafford – Paul Weston and His Orchestra – George Greeley, Piano – Capitol-1053^{Note 1}
- 1952 – "It's Magic" – Doris Day – George Greeley Piano – Columbia Catalogue 38188 (#2 US) + 1 million in sales^{Note 2}
- 1952 – "High Noon" – Frankie Laine – George Greeley, Harpsichord – # 5 US, # 7 UK^{Note 3}
- 1952 – "Flapperette" – Paul Weston Conductor – George Greeley, Piano – Columbia Records
- 1952 – "O, Come Away" / "Love in My Heart" – George Greeley, Piano – Capitol KDF-335 [Instrumentals of songs from "The Merry Widow"]
- 1952 – "You Belong to Me" – Jo Stafford – Paul Weston Conductor – George Greeley, Piano – Columbia Catalogue 39811 (# 1 US, # 1 UK)^{Note 4}
- 1953 – "I Believe" – Frankie Laine – George Greeley, Harpsichord – 18 weeks on UK Singles Chart^{Note 5}
- 1954 – Songs of Dvorak and Grieg – Dorothy Warenskjold, Soprano – George Greeley Conducting the Concert Arts Orchestra – Capitol Classics FAP-8250 (EP) [Composers names were reversed on EP]
- 1955 – "Memories Are Made of This" – Dean Martin – George Greeley, Piano – (EP) (#1 US)^{Note 6}
- 1956 – The Eddy Duchin Story (Soundtrack) – Orchestra Conducted by Harry Geller – George Greeley and Harry Sukman, pianists – CAP-716 (EP); also Capitol/EMI (Australia) EAP 1-716 (EP)
- 1962 – "On the Trail Again" Frankie Laine – George Greeley, Harpsichord – Capitol^{Note 7}
- 1964 – "Sentimental Journey – Doris Day – George Greeley, Piano – Capitol CL-2360 (Mono) & CS-9160 (Stereo) [Recorded 9-11-64]^{Note 8} ^{Note 9}

==== Notes ====
1. "Sometime" (1925 song by Gus Kahn and Ted Fiorito) reached #27, and "No Other Love" reached #10 on the Billboard charts in 1950.
2. CD release in 1994 Bear Family
3. CD release in 2003
4. CD release in 2004
5. CD release in 2001 Bear Family
6. CD release in 1997 Bear Family
7. CD released in 1992
8. This was first a hit with Doris Day and Les Brown in 1945 on Capitol-36769 (LP). It sold 5 million records. George Greeley more likely collaborated on the version recorded on September 11, 1964...although sources are unclear.
9. CD released in 2006

=== Warner Brothers recordings, LP ===
W = Mono, WS = Stereo. Uncommon practice at the time, one of Conklin's contributions as president of the new label was to make all albums available in stereo. The earliest recordings were in fact recorded in 2-track mono with the orchestra on one track and his piano isolated on the other, the same as the early Beatles would be five years later. Greeley's albums were mostly recorded at Thorne Nogar's Radio Recorders Annex studio on Sycamore Street in Hollywood. Warner Bros. Records chief engineer was Lowell Frank, and Alvino Rey, Producer, supervised from the control booth. Most of these albums were arranged and orchestrated by George Greeley. Conductor credits were not always available on the album covers.

- 1957 – The World's Ten Greatest Popular Piano Concertos – The Warner Bros. Studio Orchestra conducted by Ted Dale – George Greeley, Guest Pianist – W/WS-1249^{Note 1}
- 1959 – Latin Rhythms in Hi-Fi – The Bobby Havana Boys – George Greeley, Piano and Orchestra – W/WS-1298 (LP)
- 1959 – World Renowned Popular Piano Concertos – Warner Bros. Orchestra – George Greeley, Guest Pianist – W/WS-1291^{Note 2}
- 1959 – Greatest Motion Picture Piano Concertos – Warner Bros. Orchestra – George Greeley, Guest Pianist – W/WS-1319^{Note 3}
- 1959 – The 22 Best Loved Christmas Piano Concertos – Warner Bros. Orchestra conducted by Ted Dale – George Greeley, Guest Pianist – W/WS-1338^{Note 4}
- 1960 – The Most Beautiful Music of Hawaii – Warner Bros. Orchestra conducted by Ted Dale – featuring "The Outriggers" – George Greeley, Guest Pianist – W/WS-1366 [Valiant VS101, New Zealand and UK; Warner Bros 4017, UK]
- 1960 – Popular Piano Concertos of the World's Great Love Themes – Warner Bros, Orchestra conducted by Ted Dale – George Greeley, Guest Pianist – W/WS-1387^{Note 5}
- 1961 – Piano Italiano – Warner Bros. Orchestra – featuring Mandolin Choir – George Greeley, Guest Pianist – W/WS-1402 [WM 4306 in UK, WS 1402 in Mexico]
- 1961 – The Best of the Popular Piano Concertos – Warner Bros. Orchestra – George Greeley, Guest Pianist – 'W/WS-1410 (Compilation LP) (Peaked at # 29 on the Billboard 200)^{Note 6}
- 1961 – Popular Piano Concertos of Famous Film Themes – Warner Bros Orchestra conducted by Felix Slatkin – George Greeley, Guest Pianist – W/WS-1427 (featuring 10.5 minute concert version "Main Theme from Exodus") (LP) [Liner notes by Max Steiner and Ernest Gold]
- 1961 – Parrish (Motion Picture Soundtrack) – Composed and conducted by Max Steiner – Warner Bros. Orchestra – George Greeley, Guest Pianist – W/WS-1413.^{Note 7, Note 8}
- 1961 – Popular Piano Concertos of the Great Love Themes from "Parrish" – Composed and Conducted by Max Steiner – Warner Bros. Orchestra – George Greeley. Guest Pianist – WS-1413 (LP) (Contains 2 bonus tracks, same catalog number as above)
- 1961 – Popular Piano Concertos from the Great Broadway Musicals – Warner Bros. Orchestra – George Greeley, Guest Pianist – W/WS-1447, Liner Notes by Paul Weston (LP)
- 1962 – George Greeley Plays George Gershwin – Warner Bros. Orchestra – George Greeley, Guest Pianist – W/WS-1451 (Liner notes by George Greeley) (LP) Also released in Mexico Also released in UK as Gershwin's World, 1962
- 1962 – Themes from 'Mutiny on the Bounty' and Other Great Films – George Greeley, His Piano and Orchestra – W/WS-1476 (LP)
- 1963 – A Classic Affair – Warner Bros. Orchestra – George Greeley, Guest Pianist – W/WS-1503 (LP)
- 1967 – Piano Mood Deluxe – Warner Bros. Orchestra – George Greeley, Guest Pianist – Warner Bros.-Seven Arts Records BP-8532 (Stereo) Japanese Gatefold LP

Warner Bros. Records, 7-inch singles and EP

- 1957 – "Street Scene" / "Laura" / "Slaughter on Tenth Avenue" / Chopin's "Polonaise" WB ESA-1249 (EP) (from album WB-1249)
- 1959 – "My Love" / "Malaguena" – George Greeley, Piano – WB-5100 [Issued in Canada WB-36770]
- 1960 – "Love Is a Many-Splendored Thing" / "Around the World" – George Greeley, Piano – WB P-2517W (Japan, Snow Records)
- 1960 – "The World Is Far Away" / "You Have Funny Ways" – George Greeley, Piano – WB-5141
- 1960 – "Love Music from Tristan and Isolde" / "My Love" – George Greeley, Piano – WB-5175 [Released in Canada as WB-27638]
- 1960 – "Come Back to Surriento" / "Guenevere" – George Greeley, Piano – WB-5188
- 1961 – "Tara's Theme" / "Tara's Theme" – Warner Bros. Orchestra – George Greeley, Piano – WB-5207
- 1961 – "Unchained Melody" / "Anniversary Song" – George Greeley, Piano – WB-5210
- 1961 – "Allison's Theme from Parrish" / "Lucy's Theme from Parrish" – George Greeley, His Piano and Orchestra – WB-5218 [Released in Italy as "Vento Caldo" WB-5218; released in New Zealand as W-5218; released in UK as WB-45]
- 1961 – "Tender is the Night" / "Tonight" – Warner Bros. Orchestra – George Greeley, piano – WB-5239; also issued in Canada and Australia as WB-5239; issued in UK as WB-57^{Note 9}
- 1962 – "What Now My Love" / "11th Hour Melody" – George Greeley, Piano – WB-5264 [Issued UK as WB-62]
- 1962 – "Theme from Ride the High Country" / "Being in Love" – George Greeley, Piano – WB-5293
- 1962 – "Tender is the Night" / "Tonight" – Warner Bros. Orchestra – George Greeley, piano – WB-5511 (single); also issued in Australia, WB-5511^{Note 10}
- 1962 – "Tender is the Night" / "Tonight" / Chopin's "Polonaise" / "Mattinata" – George Greeley, Piano – WB-5511 (EP)[same cat # as single]
- 1962 – "El Maintenant" / "11th Hour Melody" / "Si tendre est la nüit (Tender is the Night)" / "Tonight" – Warner Bros. Orchestra – George Greeley, Pianist – EP-17 (France) (EP)
- 1962 – "Theme From Mutiny on the Bounty" / "Love Song from Mutiny on the Bounty(Follow Me)" – George Greeley, Piano – WB-5311 [Released in Australia as WB-5311; UK release WB-81]
- 1962 – "Les Revoltes du Bounty" / "Love Song from Mutiny on the Bounty (Follow Me)" / "Small World" from Gypsy / "Paris is a Lonely Town" from film Gay Purr-ee – George Greeley, His Piano and Orchestra – WEP-1415 France (EP)

==== Notes ====
1. see Various Labels section: 2011 CD remastered release; Marathon Media International
2. see Various Labels section: 2011 CD remastered release; Marathon Media International
3. see Various Labels section: 2011 CD remastered release; Marathon Media International
4. see Various Labels Section: 1970 LP remake Christmas Rhapsody; Harmony H-30015
5. see Various Labels section: 2011 CD remastered release; Marathon Media International
6. see Various Labels section; 2004 CD remastered release; Collector's Choice Music
7. see Various Labels section; 1990 CD remastered release; Hi-Fi Hits Limited (UK)
8. see Various Labels section: 2011 CD remastered release; Master Classic Records (UK)
9. Some sources list differing dates (1961 or 1962) for these "Tender is the Night" releases
10. George Greeley performed piano (uncredited) in the 20th Century Fox movie Tender Is the Night, per album cover

=== Various labels recordings LP and CD ===
- 1959 – Billy Vaughn Plays Stephen Foster – Billy Vaughn Conductor – Arranged by George Greeley – Dot Records DLP-25260 (LP)
- 1960 – A Keely Christmas – Keely Smith – Arranged and Conducted by George Greeley – Dot Records DLP-25345 (LP) Re-mastered and reissued by Jasmine records in 1994 on CD.
- 1961 – Dearly Beloved – Keely Smith – Arranged and Conducted by George Greeley – Dot Records DLP-25387 (LP) Re-mastered and reissued by Jasmine records in 1996 on CD.
- 1961 – His Greatest Hits – Tony Martin – Arranged and Conducted by George Greeley – Dot Records DLP-25360 (LP)
- 1963 – Piano Rhapsodies of Love – George Greeley, His Piano and Orchestra – Reprise Records R9-6092 (LP)
- 1968 – The Desert Song – Gordon MacRae, Lucille Norman, Bob Sands – Chorus and Orchestra Conducted by George Greeley – Music For Pleasure MFP-1184 (UK) [Reissue of CAP L351]
- 1969 – Greeley Plays Gershwin – George Greeley, Piano – Harmony Records HS-11309 (Abridged version of WB-1451)
- 1970 – Christmas Rapsody – Warner Bros. Symphony Orchestra – George Greeley Guest Pianist – Harmony H-30015 (LP) [remake of WS-1338]
- 1980 – Love the World Away – George Greeley and His Orchestra – RCA Music Service R-250162 (2-LP set of Orchestral Music produced by Greeley)
- 1981 – That Lovin' Feeling – George Greeley and His Orchestra – RCA Music Service R-263741 (2-LP set of Orchestral Music produced by Greeley)
- 1990 – Parrish (Motion Picture Soundtrack) – Composed and Conducted by Max Steiner – Warner Bros. Orchestra – George Greeley, Pianist – HiFi Hits Limited [Remaster of WS-1413]
- 1994 – A Keely Christmas – Keely Smith – Arranged and Conducted by George Greeley – Jasmine Music DLP-3345 (CD Remastered release)
- 2004 – Dearly Beloved – Keely Smith – Arranged and Conducted by George Greeley – Jasmine Music DLP-3387 (CD Remastered release)
- 2004 – The Best of the Popular Piano Concertos – Warner Bros. Orchestra – George Greeley, Guest Pianist – (Compilation CD) Collectors' Choice Music CCM-475 [Remastered WS-1410]
- 2007 – My Favorite Martian (Original Television Series Soundtrack) – George Greeley Composer and Conductor – La-La Land Records LLLCD 1060 (CD)
- 2008 – The Music of Victor Herbert (Naughty Marietta, The Red Mill, & Sweethearts) – Gordon MacRae – George Greeley Conductor – Anteater Records CD (AECD-1004)^{Note 1}
- 2010 – The Desert Song – Gordon Macrae, Lucille Norman – Chorus and Orchestra Conducted by George Greeley – Hallmark 77902 (CD) [Re-issue of Capitol L-351]
- 2010 – The Desert Song / Roberta – Gordon Macrae, Lucille Norman – Chorus and Orchestra Conducted by George Greeley – Sinetone AMR-510 (CD) [Reissue of 1953 Capitol Split Release P-384]
- 2011 – Parrish (Motion Picture Soundtrack) – Composed and Conducted by Max Steiner – Warner Bros. Orchestra – George Greeley, Pianist – Master Classic Records (UK)
- 2011 – The World's Ten Greatest Popular Piano Concertos – Warner Bros. Orchestra – George Greeley, Guest Pianist – Marathon Media International (CD release of WB-1249)
- 2011 – World Renowned Popular Piano Concertos – Warner Bros. Orchestra – George Greeley, Guest Pianist – Marathon Media International [CD release of WB-1291]
- 2011 – Greatest Motion Picture Piano Concertos – Warner Bros. Orchestra – George Greeley, Guest Pianist – Marathon Media International (CD release of WB-1319)
- 2011 – Popular Piano Concertos of World's Great Love Themes – Warner Bros. Orchestra – George Greeley, Guest Pianist – Marathon Media International (CD release of WB-1387)
- 2013 – Love Songs Italiane – Tony Romano – George Greeley Conductor – Vintage Music [CD release of Capitol Records H-478]
- 2013 – My Favorite Martian(Original Television Soundtrack) – George Greeley Composer and Conductor – Red Bitch Music (CD)

Singles

- 1958 – "Star Dust" / "Tenderly" – Pat Boone – Arranged by George Greeley – Dot Records^{Note 2}
- 1958 – "The Drugstore's Rockin'" – Pat Boone – Arranged by George Greeley – Dot Records^{Note 2}
- 1958 – "Moonglow" / "Yes Indeed" – Pat Boone – Arranged by George Greeley – Dot Records^{Note 3}
- 1961 – "Tea Leaves" / "Close" – Keely Smith – George Greeley, Conductor – Dot Records 16089 (from Dearly Beloved LP)
- 1961 – "La-Bou-Lay-A" / "Young in Years" – Keely Smith – George Greeley, Conductor – Dot Records 16182 (from Dearly Beloved LP)
- 1963 – "Caesar and Cleopatra Theme" / "Anthony and Cleopatra Theme" – (from 20th-Century Fox film Cleopatra) – George Greeley, His Piano and Orchestra – RepriseR-20181
- 1966 – "Who's Afraid?" (from Who's Afraid of Virginia Woolf?) / "Jungle Fantasy" – George Greeley, Piano Reprise Records R-0490

==== Notes ====
1. The third and older musical, Sweethearts, was included; but artists were all different. 1947 cast album conducted by Al Goodman. Also released as RCA Camden CAL-369 in 1956
2. CD released in 2010
3. CD released in 2011

== Filmography ==
=== Feature and television films ===
As stated above, George Greeley started as a pianist with the Columbia Pictures music department. Most individual musicians were not credited. He then became engaged as composer of stock music and title music, usually under the principal conductor. He also wrote original themes and film scores for several films, in addition to his television series compositions. This list is derived from the IMDb website.

- 1966 – Man in the Square Suit – CBS (TV movie, pilot for proposed series) – filmscore composer
- 1966 – The Iron Men – (TV movie) – Jack Chertok Television Productions – filmscore composer
- 1962 – Tender Is the Night – 20th Century Fox – Bernard Hermann filmscore – pianist (uncredited)
- 1961 – Parrish – Warner Brothers Pictures – Max Steiner filmscore – pianist (uncredited)
- 1960 – Comanche Station – Columbia Pictures – composer stock music (uncredited)
- 1959 – Good Day For a Hanging – Columbia Pictures – composer stock music (uncredited)
- 1958 – Screaming Mimi – Columbia Pictures – composer stock music (uncredited)
- 1958 – Going Steady – Columbia Pictures – composer stock music (uncredited)
- 1957 – No Time to Be Young – Columbia Pictures – composer title music (uncredited)
- 1957 – The 27th Day – Columbia Pictures – composer stock music (uncredited)
- 1957 – Calypso Heat Wave – Columbia Pictures – composer stock music (uncredited)
- 1957 – Hellcats of the Navy – Columbia Pictures – composer title music (uncredited)
- 1957 – The Guns of Fort Petticoat – Columbia Pictures – composer additional music (uncredited)
- 1956 – The Peacemaker – United Artists film – composer filmscore and conductor
- 1956 – Rumble on the Docks – Columbia Pictures – composer stock music (uncredited)
- 1956 – The White Squaw – Columbia Pictures – composer stock music (uncredited)
- 1955 – Secret of Treasure Mountain – Columbia Pictures – composer stock music (uncredited)
- 1955 – Seminole Uprising – Columbia Pictures – composer stock music (uncredited)
- 1955 – Pirates of Tripoli – Columbia Pictures – composer stock music (uncredited)
- 1955 – On the Waterfront – Columbia Pictures – Leonard Bernstein filmscore – pianist (uncredited)
- 1953 – The 5,000 Fingers of Dr. T. (Dr. Seuss) – Columbia Pictures – Morris Stoloff filmscore – pianist (credited)
- 1950 – Beyond the Purple Hills – Columbia Pictures – Gene Autry Productions – filmscore composer
- 1949 – Not Wanted – Film Classics – composer, 1 of 3 musical themes

=== Television series ===
Between 1950 and 1985, George Greeley was principal composer of the original scores and themes for approximately one hundred ninety-five television series episodes. (see IMDb.com for full episode list).

- 1985 – Small Wonder – 20th Century Fox Television – composer 13 episodes
- 1970–1971 – Nanny and the Professor – 20th Century Fox Television – composer 38 episodes
- 1963–1966 – My Favorite Martian – CBS – composer all 107 episodes; music conductor 63 episodes; music director 12 episodes
- 1964–1965 – My Living Doll – CBS – composer 26 episodes
- 1950 – The Buster Keaton Show – Consolidated Television Products – composer 1 of 4 episodes

== See also ==
- List of Italian-American entertainers
