= Rambling Rose =

Rambling Rose may refer to:

== Roses ==
- Garden roses#Climbing and rambling, rambling types of the rose flowering plant
  - Rosa multiflora, sometimes known as rambler rose

== Music ==
- "Rambling Rose" (1948 song), by Joe Burke, lyrics by Joseph McCarthy, recorded by Perry Como and others
- "Ramblin' Rose", a 1962 song written by Noel and Joe Sherman, popularized by Nat King Cole
  - Ramblin' Rose (album) by Nat King Cole, 1962
- "Ramblin' Rose", a song by Marijohn Wilkin, Fred Burch, and Obey Wilson, recorded by Jerry Lee Lewis and others

== Other uses ==
- Ramblin' Rose, a fishing vessel featured on Deadliest Catch documentary
- Rambling Rose (novel), a 1972 novel by Calder Willingham
- Rambling Rose (film), a 1991 drama film based on the novel
