= So Blue =

So Blue may refer to:

- "So Blue" (De Sylva, Brown and Henderson song), a 1927 song covered by numerous artists
- "So Blue" (Prince song), 1978
- "So Blue" (Chisato Moritaka song), 1996
- "So Blue" (Arif Mardin song), 2010
- "So Blue" (Akon song), 2013
- "So Blue" (Fantasia song), 2016
- "So Blue", a 1955 song by The Stanley Brothers
- "So Blue", a Stan Rogers song from the 1978 album: Turnaround

== See also ==
- So Blu, a 2001 album by Blu Cantrell
