= Vinton Sings Vinton =

Compilation album by Bobby Vinton
- Released: 1970
- Genre: Pop
- Label: Harmony Records
- Producer: Bob Morgan, Billy Sherrill

Bobby Vinton chronology
Sounds of Love (1970)	Vinton Sings Vinton (1970)	The Love Album (1971)

Vinton Sings Vinton is a nine-track collection of songs recorded by Bobby Vinton, all written or co-written by Vinton himself. It was released in late 1970. It contains five previously recorded songs and four new songs. The song "Kristie" was written for Vinton's daughter Kristin (his second child). "Beat of My Heart," "Kristie," and "Where is Love?" make their first appearances in stereo.

== Track listing ==
Side 1
No.	Title	Writer(s)	Length
1.	"Over and Over"	Bobby Vinton
2.	"Coming Home Soldier"	Gene Allan, Bobby Vinton
3.	"Where Is Love?"	Bobby Vinton, Gene Allan
4.	"Little Barefoot Boy"	Bobby Vinton, Gene Allan
5.	"It's Better to Have Loved"	Bobby Vinton

Side 2
No.	Title	Writer(s)	Length
1.	"Kristie"	Bobby Vinton, Gene Allan
2.	"L-O-N-E-L-Y"	Bobby Vinton
3.	"Middle of the Night"	Bobby Vinton, Gene Allan
4.	"The Beat of My Heart"	Bobby Vinton
