= Stan Wilson (folk musician) =

American musician

- Born: May 2, 1922
- Origin: Oakland, California, U.S.
- Died: June 8, 2005 (aged 83) Berkeley, California
- Genres: Folk, calypso
- Occupations: Singer, guitarist
- Instruments: Vocals, guitar
- Labels: Verve, Clef, Cavalier, Fantasy

Stan Wilson (born May 2, 1922 – June 8, 2005), was an American singer and guitarist. He is best known for his early performances in the San Francisco folk scene, especially in the Hungry I nightclub, and for his association with The Kingston Trio. The Trio recorded two of his songs, "Jane, Jane, Jane" and "Rolling Stone". Critic Ralph J. Gleason wrote that Wilson "helped make the beginnings of the folk music invasion."

Wilson recorded more than seven albums and was the first entertainer to play the hungry i club. He appeared there for six nights a week for more than three years.

Wilson died in 2005 of heart disease. He was briefly married to Tamar Hodel, who played a role in the scandals surrounding the Black Dahlia murder, and with whom he had a daughter, Deborah Elizabeth (AKA Fauna Elizabeth). He is the uncle of actor Ted Lange.

== Discography ==
- 1954: Unique Song Stylist (Cavalier)
- 1954 Leisure Time (Cavalier)
- 1955: Wanderin' With Stan Wilson (Cavalier)
- 1954: An Evening with Stan Wilson (Clef)
- 1955: Stan Wilson Recital (Clef)
- 1956: Ballads and Calypso (Verve)
- 1957: Folk Songs (Verve)
- 1957: Calypso (Verve) (with his own version of Sloop John B)
- 1958: At The Ash Grove (Verve)
- 1960: The Original Jazz Score from Shotgun (Mercury)
- 1960: Leisure Time with Stan Wilson (Verve) reissue of 1954 album with additional songs
- 1960: Stan Wilson (Verve)
- 1962: Stan Wilson Goes to College (Fantasy)
- 1963: Stan Wilson at the hungry i (Fantasy) un-released
