= Buddy Merrill =

American musician (1936–2021)

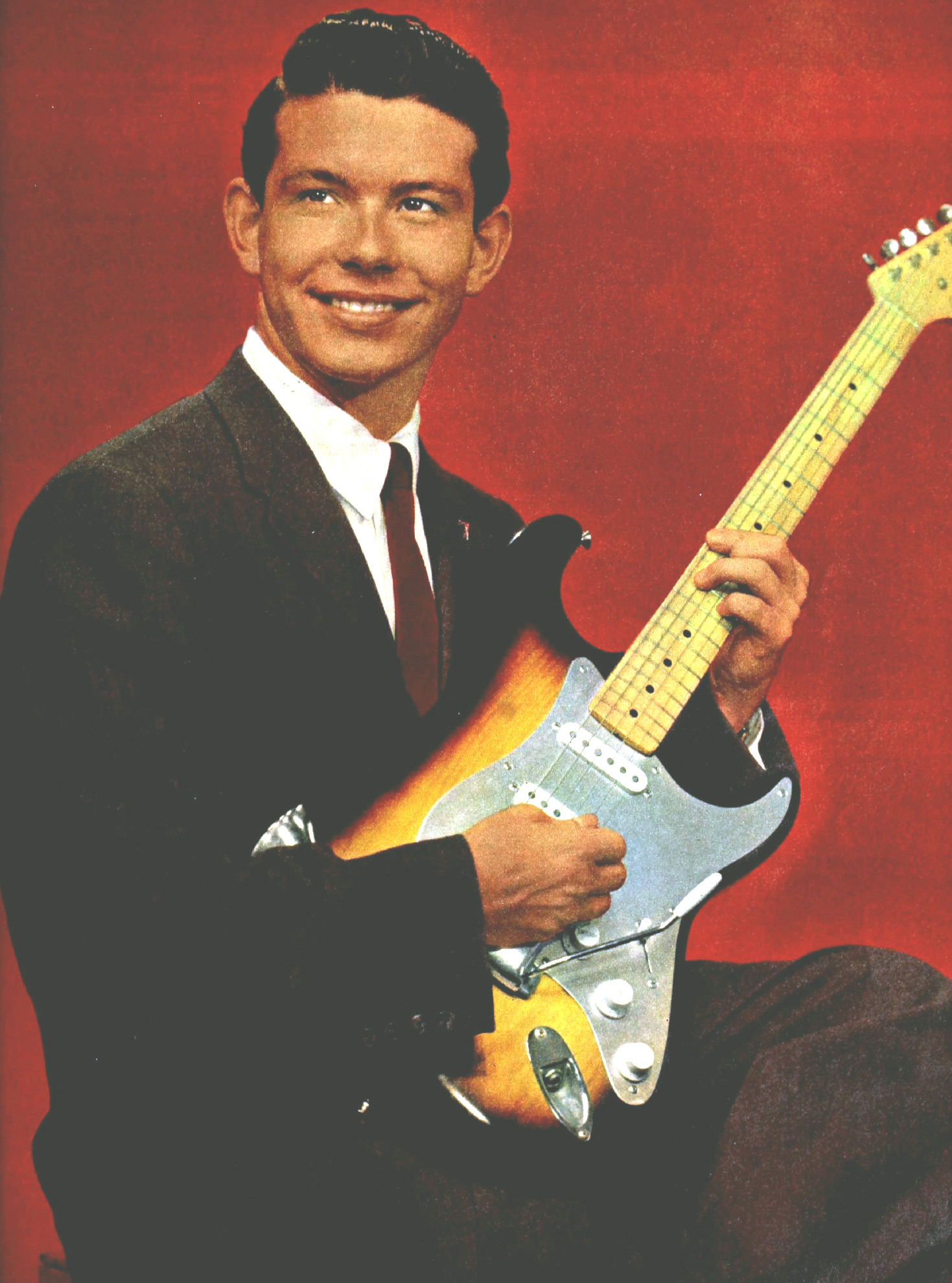

Background information
- Born: July 16, 1936; Torrey, Utah, U.S.
- Died: December 5, 2021 (aged 85)
- Instruments: Acoustic guitar; steel guitar

Leslie Merrill Behunin, Jr. (July 16, 1936 – December 5, 2021), known professionally as Buddy Merrill, was an American guitar player and steel guitar player, best known as a regular on The Lawrence Welk Show.

== Early life ==
Leslie Merrill Behunin, Jr. was the oldest of four children, born to Leslie Merrill Behunin, Sr. and Juanita Marie Ortego Behunin, in Torrey, Utah. Nicknamed "Buddy", at age eight he got his first guitar and soon began performing live with his father's band, The Fremont River Rangers. Three years later, he appeared with his father live on local television station KDYL in Salt Lake City.

When the family moved to Los Angeles, California in the early 1950s, Merrill continued to perfect his musical skills, playing both the acoustic guitar and the steel guitar. Merrill also began to do home recordings of himself playing rhythm guitar to songs.

In 1963, Merrill’s new family home was washed away from the historic Baldwin Hill Dam Break in Los Angeles while rehearsing at the Hollywood Palladium. Merrill’s wife Ruth and child Cheryl were evacuated successfully.

== The Lawrence Welk Show ==
Buddy Merrill joined The Lawrence Welk Show in 1955, the same year it first went national on ABC. On the Welk Show, he performed his guitar version of "Blue Suede Shoes," a massive hit for Carl Perkins in 1956. Merrill briefly left the show from 1959 to 1962 when he was drafted by the Army. On his return to the Music Makers, Merrill was joined in the band's rhythm section with fellow guitarist Neil LeVang.

For the next twelve years the two guitarists would perform together on television. Merrill used a Stratocaster guitar from Fender for many of his TV appearances, and in 1959 was featured in a print advertisement for the instrument.

== Life after Welk ==
In 1974, Merrill left the Welk orchestra to devote more time to writing music and recording for Producer Scott Seely’s Accent Records.

In 1975, Merrill sent a letter to Leo Fender complaining he wasn’t getting any support for his latest album Guitar Sounds Of The 70’s. Merrill didn’t hear back so he returned the free gift, a 1955 Fender Stratocaster provided to him for publicity back in 1959 for his national TV performance.

Shortly thereafter, Merrill was invited to perform with a band at the Hugh Hefner Mansion. Then things began to pick up with Merrill’s liberal connections in Hollywood that he was nominated for an award.

- Award Nomination: 1977 ACM Studio Recording Award - Rhythm Guitar Player of the Year.
- Career Note: Merrill was a featured musician on The Lawrence Welk Show from 1955 to 1974, known for his versatility on steel and standard guitars.
- Post-Welk: After leaving the show, Merrill continued his career in the 1970s by composing, recording albums, and working in film, including a 1976 symphonic work called Living Sea.

Buddy Merrill died at the age of 85 on December 5, 2021 from throat cancer leaving surviving daughter Cheryl, a violist and singer/songwriter who was born to Merrill’s future wife Ruth Merrill in 1960.

== Discography ==
- Classics in Rhythm, Accent ACD 5054, 2001
- Classic Guitars, Accent ACD 6042, 2001
- Guitars Express, ACD 6041, 1998
- The Exciting Guitars of Buddy Merrill, ACD 5038, 1998
- World of Guitars, ACD 6030, 1994 (sampler of Merrill's compositions)
- Beyond the Reef, ACD 5034, 1992
- Classics in Rhythm, ACS 5054, 1980
- Guitar Sounds of Buddy Merrill, ACS 50100, 1977
- Buddy Merrill Today, ACS 5052, 1975
- Upbeat M.O.R., ACS 5048, 1975
- World of Guitars, ACS 5042, 1972
- Country Capers, ACS 5040, 1972
- 25 Great All-Time Hits, ACS 5038, 1971
- Steel Guitar Country, ACS 5036, 1970
- Beyond the Reef, ACS 5034, 1970
- Guitar Sounds of the 70's, ACS 5032, 1970
- The Best of Buddy Merrill, ACS 5034, 1969
- Electrosonic Guitars, ACS 5028, 1969
- Land of a Thousand Guitars, ACS 5026, 1967
- Sounds of Love, ACS 5024, 1967
- The Many Splendored Guitars of Buddy Merrill, ACS 5022, 1967
- Guitars on Fire, Accent SQBO 91997
- The Exciting World of Buddy Merrill, ACS 5020, 1966
- Latin Festival, ACS 5018, 1966
- Holiday from Guitars, Accent AC 5016, 1965
- The Guitar Sounds of Buddy Merrill, ACS 5010, 1965
- Songs of the Islands (with Lawrence Welk), Dot DLP 3251, 1960 (re-issued by Ranwood R 8022 and R 2007)
