= Mark Fisher (songwriter) =

American songwriter

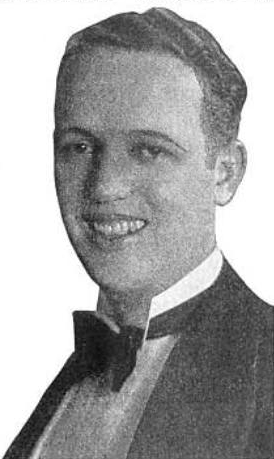
- Born: March 24, 1895; Philadelphia, Pennsylvania, US
- Died: January 2, 1948 (aged 52); Long Lake, Illinois, US
- Occupation: Songwriter
- Spouse: Leonora Fisher
- Children: 5

Mark Fisher (March 24, 1895 – January 2, 1948) was an American songwriter. Born in Philadelphia, Pennsylvania, he died in Long Lake, Illinois.

== Career ==
Many of his compositions were joint ventures with Joe Goodwin and Larry Shay (see Shay, Fisher, and Goodwin). Another collaborator was Joe Burke. Fisher's songs include "Remembering", "When You're Smiling", and "Oh, How I Miss You Tonight". As a performer he was bandleader for a number of Chicago area hotels, most notably the Marine Room at the Edgewater Beach Hotel.

== Personal life ==
Married at age 19 to Lenora, he was father to five children: Mildred, William, Ann Ella, Mark Jr, and Lenora.
