= Cavalier Records =

- Founded: 1950s
- Founder: Tom Spinosa
- Status: Defunct
- Genre: Varioius
- Country of origin: U.S.
- Location: San Francisco, California

Cavalier Records was an American record label founded by Tom Spinosa in San Francisco, California, in the early 1950s.

== Company synopsis ==
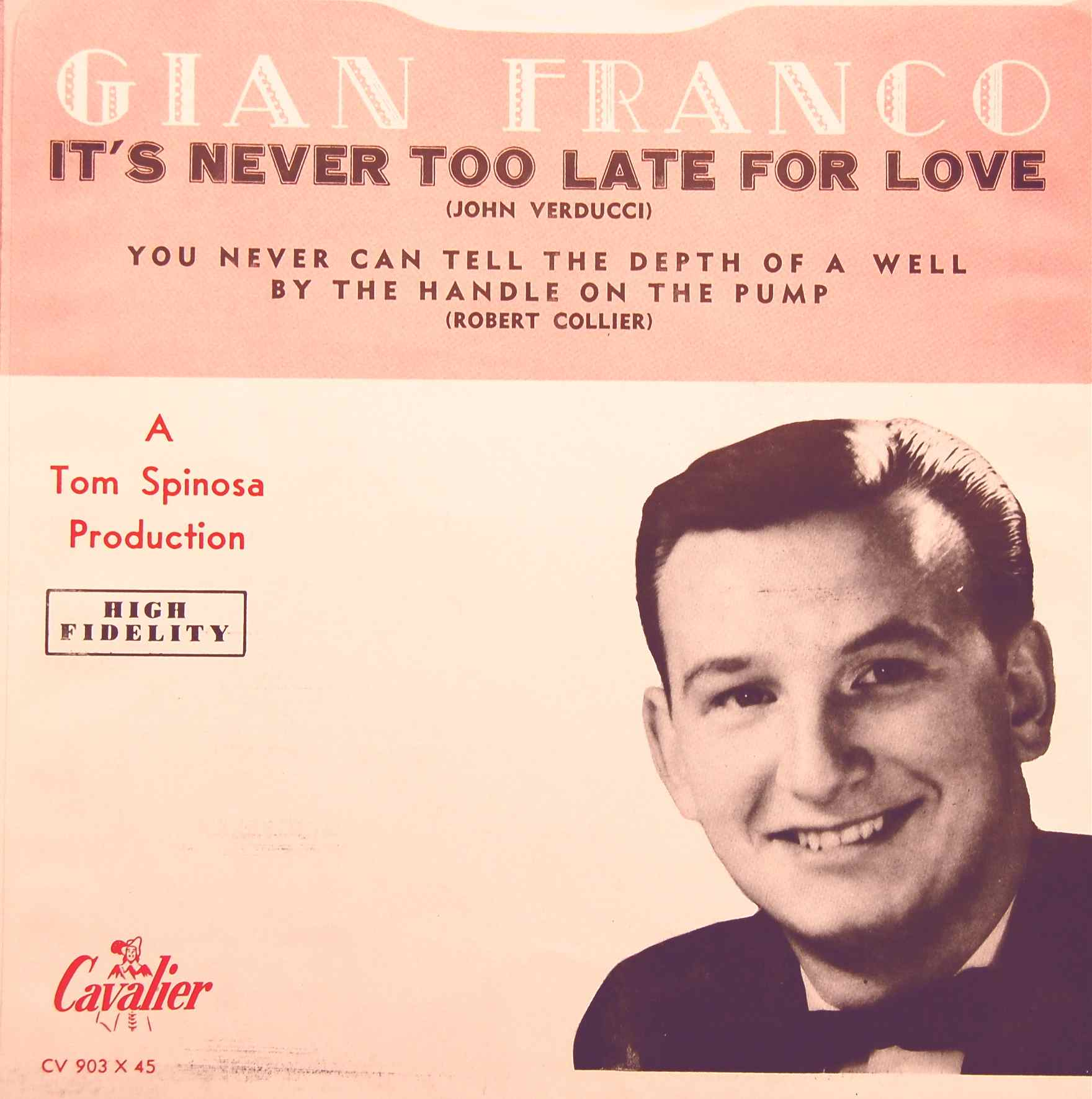
Gianfranco Giotta

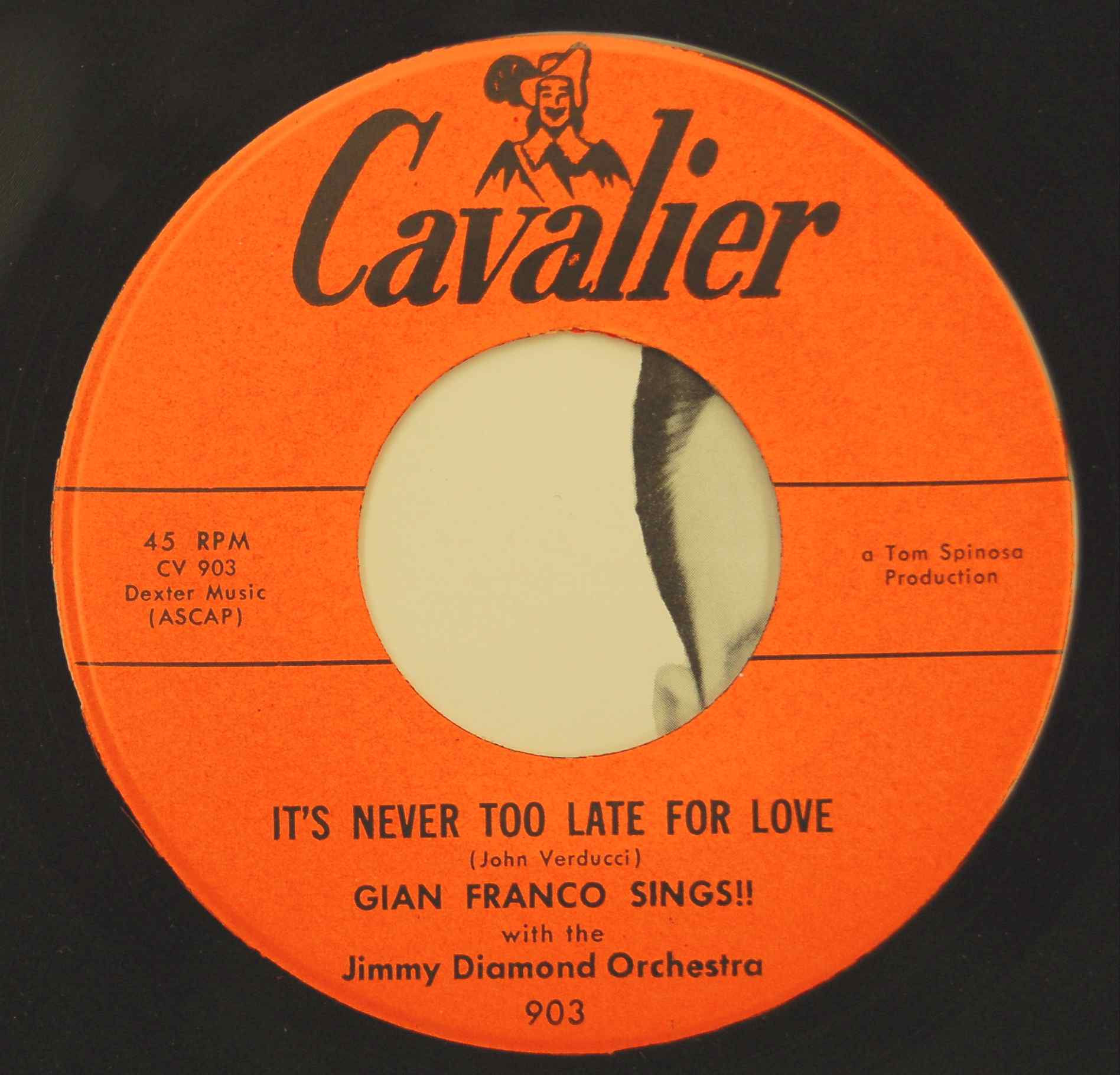

Notables who recorded on Cavalier include guitarist Nick Lucas (backed by San Francisco's Jimmy Diamond Orchestra), folk singer-songwriter Stan Wilson, Ronny Draper (younger brother of country singer Rusty Draper), San Francisco "hum-along" pianist Burt Bales, local Western Music performers and entrepreneurs Black Jack Wayne and Chuck Wayne, and singer Gianfranco Giotta, who collaborated with composer John Verducci, Tom Spinosa and the Jimmy Diamond Orchestra to record Cavalier 7"/45 r.p.m. (CV 903) "It's Never Too Late for Love" and Robert Collier's "You Never Can Tell the Depth of a Well" under the title "Gian Franco Sings!" c. 1964.

== See also ==
- List of record labels
- Cavalier Records Discography at 45cat.com
