= Country Boy (Bobby Vinton album) =

Studio album by Bobby Vinton
- Released: April 1966
- Genre: Country pop
- Label: Epic
- Producers: Bob Morgan and Billy Sherrill

Bobby Vinton chronology
More of Bobby's Greatest Hits (1966)	Country Boy (1966)	Live at the Copa (1966)

Country Boy is Bobby Vinton's fourteenth studio album, released in 1966. This album contains country songs, most of which were hits for different country music artists. All of the songs were recorded in Nashville. Cover versions include "Detour", "Riders in the Sky", "Crazy" and "Once a Day". There were no singles released from this album.

== Critical reception ==
Billboard stated, "Vinton successfully displays further understanding and feel for all types of music as he moves into the country field with ease and sales appeal," believing that the "material's pop country and extremely well performed."

== Track listing ==
Side 1
No.	Title	Writer(s)	Length
1.	"I'm Just a Country Boy"	Fred Brooks, Marshall Barer	2:40
2.	"Livin' in a House Full of Love"	Billy Sherrill, Glenn Sutton	2:09
3.	"Gone"	Smokey Rogers	2:09
4.	"Remembering"	Bobby Vinton	2:02
5.	"Detour"	Paul Westmoreland	2:09

Side 2
No.	Title	Writer(s)	Length
1.	"Riders in the Sky"	Stan Jones	2:46
2.	"Alabam"	Lloyd Copas	2:09
3.	"Crazy"	Willie Nelson	2:23
4.	"Once a Day"	Bill Anderson	2:32
5.	"Y'all Come"	Arlie Duff	2:12

== Personnel ==
- Bob Morgan – producer
- Billy Sherrill – producer
