= Sweethearts on Parade (1953 film) =

1953 film by Allan Dwan

- Theatrical release poster
- Directed by: Allan Dwan
- Screenplay by: Houston Branch
- Produced by: Allan Dwan
- Starring: Ray Middleton; Lucille Norman; Eileen Christy; Bill Shirley; Estelita Rodriguez; Clinton Sundberg
- Cinematography: Reggie Lanning
- Edited by: Fred Allen
- Production company: Republic Pictures
- Distributed by: Republic Pictures
- Release date: July 15, 1953
- Running time: 90 minutes
- Country: United States
- Language: English

Sweethearts on Parade is a 1953 American drama film directed by Allan Dwan, written by Houston Branch, and starring Ray Middleton, Lucille Norman, Eileen Christy, Bill Shirley, Estelita Rodriguez and Clinton Sundberg. It was released on July 15, 1953, by Republic Pictures.

== Plot ==
In the 1870s, in Kokomo, Indiana, teenager Sylvia Townsend lives with her mother Kathleen, who teaches music to the local children. Kathleen is being courted by Harold Wayne, a doctor, while Harold's son Tommy is romantically interested in Sylvia. Sylvia, who never knew her real father, tells Kathleen that she would like her to remarry as she feels the need for a father-figure in her life. When alone, Kathleen recalls her life as a young singer: Kathleen appears in a production of The Bohemian Girl and marries fellow performer Cam Ellerby. After Sylvia is born, Cam is unfaithful, so Kathleen leaves him and settles with Sylvia in Kokomo. Kathleen's reverie is interrupted by the arrival in town of the Ogalla Remedy medicine show. As the wagon pass the Townsend house, Bill Gamble and Jim Riley, two young men with the company, gaze admiringly at Sylvia. Later, when Sylvia, who is an aspiring performer, asks to attend the show, her mother tells her that medicine shows are cheap and common. As the show sets up its theater tent in town, Harold, in his role as public health officer, and Sheriff Doolittle arrive to attempt to run it out of town. However, the show's proprietor, Cam, is able to appease the sheriff by claiming they are both members of the same brotherhood organization, then introduces Harold to Bill, who is a licenced doctor and has also studied music. Bill admits to Harold that their Ogalla medicine has no medical value, but says that it seems to do people a lot of good. Meanwhile, the show's female star, Lolita Lamont, and two of the female dancers flirt with the sheriff, who allows the show, or “concert” as Cam calls it, to continue. The next day, while walking near the Townsend house, Bill sees Sylvia in the garden and tells her that he is a doctor with an interest in music. Sylvia introduces him to her mother, who is impressed by Bill's singing. Later, while Sylvia is out walking with Bill, Harold visits Kathleen, and upon learning that Sylvia is with the "young whipper-snapper" from the medicine show, sends Tommy to find her. Harold again proposes marriage to Kathleen and faints with happiness when she accepts. Meanwhile, Bill confesses to Sylvia that he is with the show and she asks him to take her backstage, where she meets several members of the company. In the empty theater, Bill accompanies the stage-struck Sylvia as she sings an operatic aria she learned from her mother. When Cam hears Sylvia singing, he is reminded of Kathleen performing the same piece and, disturbed, orders Sylvia to leave. Bill escorts Sylvia home and, although he apologizes to Kathleen for causing her concern, Kathleen later warns her daughter that Bill may cause her great unhappiness. Kathleen then relates that she had been a singer and had married a man then left him when Sylvia was only one month old. Meanwhile, Cam is getting drunk in his wagon, bemoaning his lost love, Kathleen. Lolita, who is in love with Cam, helps him to sober up for the show, but while in a drunken state, he accidentally hurts her. Just as Bill is comforting Lolita, Sylvia arrives, sees them together and assumes that they are sweethearts. Disappointed, she turns to leave, but trips and is knocked unconscious. When Sylvia awakens in Cam's wagon, he offers kindly, fatherly advice. Kathleen, who has followed Sylvia, then comes face-to-face with Cam, and they are both shocked. After the women leave, a flustered Cam strikes Bill several times and fires him, prompting Lolita to decide to leave the show. Later, when Kathleen and Cam meet privately, Lolita overhears Cam's regret over his womanizing and plea that Kathleen not let Sylvia know her father is a medicine show drunk. After Kathleen tells him that she plans to remarry, Cam asks her to leave. Cam then apologizes to Bill, explaining that Sylvia is his daughter. The next morning, as the wagons prepare to depart, Lolita visits Sylvia and tells her that she was never in love with Bill and was simply trying to make Cam jealous. After informing Sylvia that Bill loves her, Lolita reveals that Cam is Sylvia's father and advises her to stop her mother from remarrying, as she believes that Kathleen is still in love with Cam. Sylvia then begs her mother to leave with her and the show, and when the wagons pass by the house once again, Cam and Bill are thrilled to see Kathleen and Sylvia waiting to join them.

== Cast ==
- Ray Middleton as Cam Ellerby
- Lucille Norman as Kathleen Townsend
- Eileen Christy as Sylvia Townsend Ellerby
- Bill Shirley as Bill Gamble
- Estelita Rodriguez as Lolita Lamont
- Clinton Sundberg as Dr. Harold Wayne
- Harry Carey, Jr. as Jim Riley, aka James Whitcomb Riley
- Irving Bacon as Sheriff Doolittle
- Leon Tyler as Tommy Wayne
- Marjorie Wood as Wardrobe Woman
- Mara Corday as Belle
- Ann McCrea as Flo
- Tex Terry as Zebe
- Emory Parnell as Mayor
- George Bamby as Musician
- The Republic Rhythm Riders as Musicians
- Michael Barton as Musician
- Bud Dooley as Musician
- Slim Duncan as Townsman
- Darol Rice as Musician
