= Accent Records (US) =

American record label

- Accent 78rpm label from 1954
- Founded: 1954
- Status: Defunct
- Genre: Jazz, traditional pop, country
- Country of origin: U.S.
- Location: Hollywood, California

Accent Records was a Hollywood-based record label formed in 1954. Scott Seely was the president. Nick Lucas signed to the label in 1955 and made his final recording for them in 1980. Previously releasing only singles, Accent's first LP record, an album by Drew Page, was released in 1956.

== History ==
1966 saw GNP Crescendo make a marketing, packaging, and distribution deal with Accent for Buddy Merrill's guitar albums, following a tip that Merrill's recordings were selling well as a result of in-store plays.

In 1967 Accent made the decision to focus on country music.

The label promoted a self-learn course for pop singers in 1971.

Seely remained president until at least 2006. Accent Records owned the Boomerang Music and S&R Music publishing companies.

== Artists ==
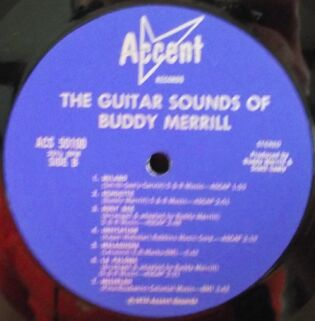
Accent LP label from 1976

- Bob Bellows
- Roy Goodrich
- Nick Lucas
- Buddy Merrill
- Bill Myrick
- Kelly Norwood
- Millicent Rodgers
- Wes Stuart
- Clarice Howard
- Dick Dale
- Katherine Kovar
- Becky Cooper
