= Carson City (film) =

1952 film

- Theatrical release poster
- Directed by: Andre de Toth
- Screenplay by: Sloan Nibley; Winston Miller
- Story by: Sloan Nibley
- Produced by: Bryan Foy; David Weisbart
- Starring: Randolph Scott; Lucille Norman; Raymond Massey
- Cinematography: John W. Boyle
- Edited by: Robert L. Swanson
- Music by: David Buttolph
- Color process: Warnercolor
- Production company: Warner Bros. Pictures
- Distributed by: Warner Bros. Pictures
- Release date: June 13, 1952
- Running time: 87 minutes
- Country: United States
- Language: English
- Box office: $1.7 million (U.S. rentals)

Carson City is a 1952 American Western film directed by Andre de Toth and starring Randolph Scott, Lucille Norman and Raymond Massey. The screenplay is based on a story by Sloan Nibley. Filmed on location at Iverson Ranch, Bell Moving Picture Ranch and Bronson Canyon in Griffith Park, Carson City is Warner Bros. Pictures' first film shot in Warnercolor.

== Plot ==
Mine owner William Sharon, whose gold shipments are frequently robbed by a gang of bandits, hires banker Charles Crocker, who has connections to the Central Pacific Railroad, to build a spur line from Virginia City to Carson City so that the gold can be shipped by rail. Silent Jeff Kincaid is the railroad engineer.

Rival mine owner Big Jack Davis opposes the new railway line, as he is responsible for the holdup gang. Kincaid vows to rid Carson City of the bandits, but he is framed on a murder charge. Kincaid must contend with a suspicious landslide that kills and traps some of his workers as well as a gold-bullion heist.

== Cast ==
- Randolph Scott as Silent Jeff Kincaid
- Lucille Norman as Susan Mitchell
- Raymond Massey as A. J. "Big Jack" Davis
- Richard Webb as Alan Kincaid
- James Millican as Jim Squires
- Larry Keating as William Sharon
- George Cleveland as Henry Dodson
- William Haade as Hardrock Haggerty
- Don Beddoe as Zeke Mitchell
- Thurston Hall as Charles Crocker
- Vince Barnett as Henry
