= Bobby Vinton Sings Satin Pillows and Careless =

Studio album by Bobby Vinton
- Released: January 1966
- Genre: Pop
- Length: 23:56
- Label: Epic
- Producers: Bob Morgan and Billy Sherrill

Bobby Vinton chronology
Drive-In Movie Time (1965)	Bobby Vinton Sings Satin Pillows and Careless (1966)	More of Bobby's Greatest Hits (1966)

Bobby Vinton Sings Satin Pillows and Careless is Bobby Vinton's thirteenth studio album, released in January 1966.

Two singles came from this album: the album title tracks on one single and "Petticoat White (Summer Sky Blue)". Cover versions include "Everyone's Gone to the Moon" and "Someday (You'll Want Me to Want You)".

== Critical reception ==
Cashbox stated that "A warm, tender style, set to a batch of highly romantic ballads, gives the package the necessary ingredients for top sales," adding "Other tracks that should draw the consumer include 'Bitter Teardrops' and 'Two Purple Shadows.'"

== Track listing ==
Side 1
No.	Title	Writer(s)	Length
1.	"Petticoat White (Summer Sky Blue)"	Doc Pomus, Mort Shuman	2:24
2.	"Bitter Teardrops"	Gene Allen, Bobby Vinton	2:31
3.	"All the King's Horses (And All the King's Men)"	Doc Pomus, Mort Shuman	2:50
4.	"Careless"	Lew Quadling, Dick Jurgens, Eddy Howard	2:14
5.	"You Own My Heart"	Doc Pomus, Anne Jeffreys	2:33

Side 2
No.	Title	Writer(s)	Length
1.	"Satin Pillows"	Sonny James, Robert Tubert	2:27
2.	"Two Purple Shadows"	Sammy Mysels, Dick Sanford	2:16
3.	"Everyone's Gone to the Moon"	Jonathan King	2:14
4.	"Going Steady With a Heartache"	Bobby Vinton, Lee Morris	2:33
5.	"Someday (You'll Want Me to Want You)"	Jimmie Hodges	1:58

== Charts ==
Album - Billboard (North America)

Year	Chart	Position
1966	The Billboard 200	110

Singles - Billboard (North America)

Year	Single	Chart	Position
1966	"Satin Pillows"	The Billboard Hot 100	23
1966	"Careless"	Bubbling Under Hot 100 Singles	111
1966	"Petticoat White (Summer Sky Blue)"	The Billboard Hot 100	81
