= Mr. Lonely (Bobby Vinton album) =

Studio album by Bobby Vinton
- Released: December 1964
- Genre: Pop
- Label: Epic
- Producer: Bob Morgan

Bobby Vinton chronology
A Very Merry Christmas (1964)	Mr. Lonely (1964)	Bobby Vinton Sings for Lonely Nights (1965)

Singles from Mr. Lonely
- 1. "Mr. Lonely" Released: October 16, 1964

Professional ratings
Review scores
Source	Rating
AllMusic	4/5 stars

Mr. Lonely is Bobby Vinton's tenth studio album, released in 1964. It was released right after the success of his fourth and final No. 1 US hit "Mr. Lonely," a 1962 song that was released as a single after its appearance on Bobby Vinton's Greatest Hits. Cover versions on this album include "Laughing on the Outside (Crying on the Inside)" and "I'll Never Smile Again". After the success of the single, Vinton released Bobby Vinton Sings for Lonely Nights, an album of songs devoted to the subject of loneliness.

== Track listing ==
Side 1
No.	Title	Writer(s)	Length
1.	"Mr. Lonely"	Bobby Vinton, Gene Allan	2:40
2.	"Always, Always (Yesterday's Love Song)"	Chip Taylor	2:34
3.	"Tina"	Bobby Vinton, Lee Morris, Ty Lemley	2:14
4.	"Forever Yours I Remain"	Hal David, Burt Bacharach	2:31
5.	"Life Goes On"	Paul Evans, Paul Parnes	3:04
6.	"Laughing on the Outside (Crying on the Inside)"	Bernie Wayne, Ben Raleigh	2:34

Side 2
No.	Title	Writer(s)	Length
1.	"A Thing Called Sadness"	Chuck Howard	2:38
2.	"The Grass Is Always Greener"	Charlie Rich, Margaret Ann Rich	2:17
3.	"I'll Never Smile Again"	Ruth Lowe	2:40
4.	"Someone I Used to Know"	Bobby Vinton, Lee Morris	2:12
5.	"Satin"	Bobby Vinton, Lee Morris	2:28
6.	"It's Better to Have Loved"	Bobby Vinton, Gene Allan	2:42

== Personnel ==
- Bob Morgan – producer
- Robert Mersey – arranger, conductor ("Mr. Lonely")
- Garry Sherman – arranger, conductor ("Always, Always (Yesterday's Love Song)")
- Charles Calello – arranger, conductor ("Tina")
- Burt Bacharach – arranger ("Forever Yours I Remain")
- Stan Applebaum – arranger, conductor ("Life Goes On" and "Laughing on the Outside (Crying on the Inside)")
- Bill Walker – arranger ("A Thing Called Sadness", "The Grass Is Always Greener", "I'll Never Smile Again" and "It's Better to Have Loved")

== Charts ==
Album – Billboard (North America)

Year	Chart	Position
1965	The Billboard 200	18

Singles – Billboard (North America)

Year	Single	Chart	Position
1964	"Mr. Lonely"	Billboard Hot 100	1
1964	"Mr. Lonely"	Billboard Adult Contemporary	3
