= Nick Lucas =

American jazz musician (1897–1982)

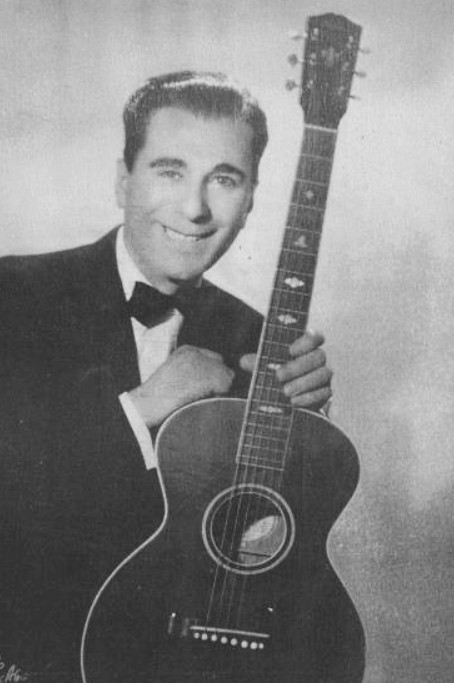
- Lucas in 1944

Background information
- Born: Dominic Antonio Nicholas Lucanese; August 22, 1897; Newark, New Jersey, U.S.
- Died: July 28, 1982 (aged 84) Colorado Springs, Colorado, U.S.
- Genres: Jazz, traditional pop
- Occupations: Musician, bandleader
- Instruments: Guitar, vocals
- Years active: 1912–1981
- Labels: Pathé, Brunswick, Durium, Cavalier, Accent
- Formerly of: Duke Ellington, Jimmie Noone, Wilber Sweatman, Spirits of Rhythm
- Spouse: Catherine Ciffrodella (1917–1970)
- Website: nicklucas.com

Dominic Antonio Nicholas Lucanese (August 22, 1897 – July 28, 1982), better known by his stage name Nick Lucas, was an American jazz singer and guitarist. He was the first jazz guitarist to record as a soloist. His popularity during his lifetime came from his reputation as a singer. His signature song was "Tiptoe Through the Tulips".

== Background and career ==
=== Formative years ===
Lucas was born into an Italian-American family in Newark, New Jersey on August 22, 1897, his parents hailing from Ariano di Puglia, Campania. He had eight siblings, five of whom surpassed their formative years.

His father, Otto, a landscaper and tree surgeon, was illiterate in English, although he was able to speak it; owing to his poor health, the family had relocated to the country—particularly Silver Lake—around 1900. A year subsequent, he tasked his son, Frank, a renowned accordionist, to teach the young Nick, then known as Dominic, a musical instrument. Since he was "too small to comfortably handle a guitar or banjo," the mandolin was deemed to be a suitable alternative for the young boy.

By 1905, Dominic had developed a routine comprising both his academics and musical pursuits, the latter used as a means of assisting his family with respect to income. Consequently, he was unable to receive adequate sleep and thus was prone to sleeping through his classes.

In 1913, upon graduating from grammar school, he was presented with a choice from his father concerning whether he would opt for continuing his education or apprenticing; he chose the latter. Given his youth and musical aptitude, his coworkers would find it questionable as to why he was laboring among them.

Upon the commencement of his relationship with his future wife, Catherine Ciffrodella, he decided that it would be best for him to resign and capitalize upon his talent and passion. He henceforth had begun performing at local cafes, during which he adopted his reputed stage name: Nick Lucas.

=== Recording career ===
In 1912, at the age of fifteen, Lucas delivered his inaugural record performance, in particular for Thomas Edison's phonograph company. He retrospectively described the inventor as a "very nice man who was genuinely interested in the proper recording of string instruments."

In 1922, at the age of 25, he gained renown with his hit renditions of "Pickin' the Guitar" and "Teasin' the Frets" for Pathé. In 1923, Gibson Guitars proposed to build him a concert guitar with a deeper body. Known as the "Nick Lucas Special," it became a popular model with guitarists such as Bob Dylan. It was this guitar's outline that was later used as the basis for the Gibson Les Paul solid body electric guitar. Also in 1923, he began recording for Brunswick and remained one of their exclusive artists until 1932.

In 1929, Lucas co-starred in the Warner Bros. two-color Technicolor musical, Gold Diggers of Broadway, in which he introduced the two hit songs "Painting the Clouds with Sunshine" and "Tiptoe Through the Tulips", which survives in a fully synchronized and preserved Vitaphone disc. The same year, Lucas was featured in the studio's all-star revue, The Show of Shows. Lucas turned down Warner Bros. seven-year contract offer, which went instead to fellow crooner Dick Powell.

In April 1930, Warner bought Brunswick and gave him his own orchestra, billed on his records as "The Crooning Troubadours". This arrangement lasted until December 1931, when Warner licensed Brunswick to the American Record Corporation (ARC). The new owners were not as extravagant as Warner Bros. had previously been and Lucas lost his orchestra and eventually left Brunswick in 1932. He made two recordings for Durium in 1932 for their Hit of the Week series. These would prove to be his last major recordings.

Lucas spent the rest of his career performing on radio, in night clubs and dance halls. He made a number of recordings for small or independent labels, including Cavalier, where he was billed as the "Cavalier Troubadour." In 1944, he reprised some of his old hits in soundies movie musicals and filmed another group of songs for Snader Telescriptions in 1951, including his hit of "Walkin' My Baby Back Home".

He signed with Accent in 1955 and remained with the label for 25 years. Lucas once made an extended eight-month tour of Australia when he was on the road. In the mid-1970s he came to the attention of a new generation, being heard on the soundtracks of a handful of period films, after he was chosen to record the vocal refrains for The Great Gatsby. As of 2026, Nick Lucas has had one of the longest singing careers ever, spanning 69 years.

== Personal life ==
Nick Lucas enjoyed a long marriage of 53 years to Catherine Ciffrodella, whom he married on August 22, 1917. They had one daughter, Emily Lucas Bissell (1918–2013) and three grandchildren.

== Later years and death ==
Lucas became friends with Tiny Tim, who considered him an inspiration and who borrowed "Tiptoe Through the Tulips" as his own theme song. Most people believe that Tiny Tim was the original singer of "Tiptoe Through the Tulips". Lucas sang the song to him when he married Miss Vicki on The Tonight Show Starring Johnny Carson on December 17, 1969. Nick Lucas was interviewed all throughout the 1970s and the early 1980s.

In 1974, his renditions of the songs, "I'm Gonna Charleston Back to Charleston", "When You and I Were Seventeen" and "Five Foot Two, Eyes of Blue" were featured on the soundtrack of The Great Gatsby (1974), selected by the film's musical director Nelson Riddle.

In 1975, Nick Lucas performed a sold-out show at Mayfair Music Hall in Santa Monica, California. In 1977, he celebrated his 80th birthday. This footage is available on YouTube. In 1980, Lucas rode in the Rose Bowl Parade on his float 'Tiptoe Through the Tulips'. In 1981, Lucas collaborated with Riddle one last time to sing 4 minutes of his best-selling hits. This was one of his last public appearances.

On July 28, 1982, less than a month before his 85th birthday, Nick Lucas died in Colorado Springs, Colorado, from complications of double pneumonia. He was interred with his wife Catherine in the "Shrine of Remembrance" in Colorado Springs, Colorado.

== Filmography ==
=== Film ===
Title	Director	Year and Company
Gold Diggers of Broadway	Roy Del Ruth	Warner Bros. 1929
The Show of Shows	John G. Adolfi	Warner Bros. 1929
Nick Lucas Song		Vitaphone - 1929
Organloguing the Hits With Nick Lucas		Master Art Products - 1931
Home Again		Master Art Products - 1933
On the Air and Off		Universal - 1933
What This Country Needs		Vitaphone - 1934
Nick Lucas and His Troubadours	Joseph Henabery	Vitaphone - 1936
Vitaphone Headliners		Vitaphone - 1936
Yankee Doodle Home	Arthur Dreifuss	Columbia - 1939
Congamania (Nick sings "In a Little Spanish Town")	Larry Caballos	Universal - 1940
Goodnight, Wherever You Are		Soundies - 1944
An Hour Never Passes		Soundies - 1944
Tiptoe Through the Tulips With Me		Soundies - 1944
Side By Side		Soundies - 1944
Big Time Revue		Warner Bros. - 1947
Disc Jockey	Will Jason	Allied Artists - 1951
I'm Looking at The World Thru Rose Colored Glasses		Snader - 1951
I Love the Sunshine of your Smile		Snader - 1951
Get Out Those Old Records		Snader - 1951
Mexicali Rose		Snader - 1951
Marie, Ah, Marie		Snader - 1951
Bela Bimba		Snader - 1951
Walkin' My Baby Back Home		Snader - 1951
The Great Gatsby	Jack Clayton	Paramount - 1974 (voice only)
The Day of The Locust	John Schlesinger	Paramount - 1975 (voice only)
Hearts of the West	Howard Zieff	MGM - 1975 (Voice only) (Final film role)

=== Theatre ===
Sweetheart Time	1926
Show Girl	1929
Blackouts Of 1949	1949

=== Television ===
The Lawrence Welk Show	ABC, 1962-1965

== Discography ==
Nick Lucas discography
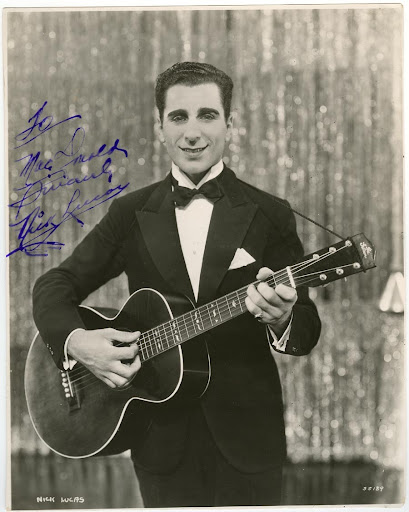
- Lucas in The Show Of Shows (1929)
- Studio albums: 7
- Compilation albums: 17
- Singles: 266

=== Albums ===
Studio Albums
Title	Year	Label
Tiptoe Thru The Tulips With Nick Lucas	1953	Cavalier
Tiptoe Thru The Tulips With Nick Lucas - Extended Version	1957	Cavalier
Painting The Clouds With Sunshine	1957	Decca
"The Nick Lucas" Souvenir Album	1968	Accent
Rose Colored Glasses	1969	Accent
An Evening With Nick Lucas	1982	Take Two
The Singing Troubadour	1983	ASV/Living Era

Compilation Albums
Title	Year	Label
Tiptoe Thru The Tulips	2000	ASV/Living Era
Painting The Clouds With Sunshine	2001	Soundies
The Crooning Troubadour	2002	Crystal Stream Audio
Souvenir Album	2006	Melody Man
First and Last Accents	2007	Melody Man
Singing Troubadour	2010	Hallmark
Nick Lucas #1	2011	M. C. Productions
Nick Lucas #2	2011	M. C. Productions
Nick Lucas–1920's Jazz Vocals and Guitar Encore 1; 1925-1926	2014	Vintage Recordings
Nick Lucas–1920's Jazz Vocals and Guitar Encore 2; 1926-1927	2015	Vintage Recordings
Nick Lucas–1920's Jazz Vocals and Guitar Encore 3; 1928-1932	2015	Vintage Recordings
The Singing Troubadour	2015	Vintage Music
Looking Over A Four-Leaf Clover	2016	Emerald Echoes
Golden Song Spotlight	2018	Melody Man
Presenting Nick Lucas	2022	Universal Digital Enterprises
Picking The Guitar	2024	Transatlantica
At His Best	2025	E. N. Digital

=== Singles ===
1922-1949
Year	Title	US	Label	Certifications
1922	Picking The Guitar	—	Pathe	
1922	Teasing the Frets	—	Pathe	
1924	Dreamer of Dreams	—	Brunswick	
1924	My Best Girl	4	Brunswick	
1924	Because They All Love You	—	Brunswick	
1924	Somebody Like You	—	Brunswick	
1925	If I Can't Have You	—	Brunswick	
1925	I've Named My Pillow After You	—	Brunswick	
1925	When I Think Of You	—	Brunswick	
1925	The Only, Only One	—	Brunswick	
1925	Isn't She The Sweetest Thing	—	Brunswick	
1925	By the Light Of The Stars	—	Brunswick	
1925	I Might Have Known	—	Brunswick	
1925	I'm Tired Of Everything But You	—	Brunswick	
1925	I Found Somebody to Love	—	Brunswick	
1925	Brown Eyes, Why Are You Blue	2	Brunswick	
1925	Sleepy Time Gal	3	Brunswick	
1925	Smile, A Little Bit, Smile	—	Brunswick	
1925	Who's Who Are You	—	Brunswick	
1925	Forever and Ever with You	—	Brunswick	
1926	A Cup of Coffee, A Sandwich, and You	—	Brunswick	
1926	Always	4	Brunswick	
1926	Adorable	—	Brunswick	
1926	No Foolin'	—	Brunswick	
1926	Bye Bye Blackbird	4	Brunswick	
1926	My Bundle Of Love	—	Brunswick	
1926	I'm Glad I Found A Girl Like You	—	Brunswick	
1926	Let Me Live and Love You Just For Tonight	—	Brunswick	
1926	How Many Times	—	Brunswick	
1926	Sleepy Head	—	Brunswick	
1926	Looking at the World Thru Rose Colored Glasses	—	Brunswick	
1926	When You're Lonely	—	Brunswick	
1926	Precious	—	Brunswick	
1926	Hello Bluebird	—	Brunswick	
1926	I'd Love to Call You My Sweetheart	—	Brunswick	
1926	Because I Love You	—	Brunswick	
1926	I've Got The Girl	—	Brunswick	
1927	Put Your Arms Where They Belong	—	Brunswick	
1927	In A Little Spanish Town	—	Brunswick	
1927	I'm Looking Over A Four-Leaf Clover	—	Brunswick	
1927	High, High, High Up In The Hills	—	Brunswick	
1927	I'm Looking For A Girl Named Mary	—	Brunswick	
1927	Underneath The Weeping Willow	—	Brunswick	
1927	Moonbeam! Kiss Her For Me	—	Brunswick	
1927	So Blue	13	Brunswick	
1927	Side By Side	2	Brunswick	
1927	Why Should I Say That I'm Sorry	—	Brunswick	
1927	Rosy Cheeks	—	Brunswick	
1927	Underneath The Stars with You	—	Brunswick	
1927	Sing Me A Baby Song	—	Brunswick	
1927	Broken Hearted	10	Brunswick	
1927	Sweet Someone	—	Brunswick	
1927	I Can't Believe That You're In Love With Me	—	Brunswick	
1927	Among My Souvenirs	—	Brunswick	
1927	My Blue Heaven	7	Brunswick	
1927	The Song Is Ended	—	Brunswick	
1927	Kiss and Make Up	—	Brunswick	
1927	Keep Sweeping The Cobwebs Off The Moon	—	Brunswick	
1927	Together	12	Brunswick	
1927	Without You Sweetheart	—	Brunswick	
1928	My Ohio Home	—	Brunswick	
1928	Sunshine	—	Brunswick	
1928	I'm Waiting For Ships That Never Come In	—	Brunswick	
1928	I Still Love You	—	Brunswick	
1928	It Must Be Love	—	Brunswick	
1928	I Can't Do Without You	—	Brunswick	
1928	Just Like A Melody From Out Of The Sky	—	Brunswick	
1928	When You Said Goodnight	—	Brunswick	
1928	You're A Real Sweetheart	—	Brunswick	
1928	For Old Times Sake	—	Brunswick	
1928	Someday, Somewhere	—	Brunswick	
1928	Chiquita	—	Brunswick	
1928	My Tonia	—	Brunswick	
1928	The Song I Love	—	Brunswick	
1928	When The World Is At Rest	—	Brunswick	
1928	I'll Never Ask For More	—	Brunswick	
1929	I'll Get By	12	Brunswick	
1929	You're Not Asking Me(I'm Telling You)	—	Brunswick	
1929	Some Rainy Day	—	Brunswick	
1929	How About Me	—	Brunswick	
1929	Old Timer	—	Brunswick	
1929	Heart O' Mine	—	Brunswick	
1929	I've Got A Feeling I'm Falling	—	Brunswick	
1929	Coquette	—	Brunswick	
1929	My Song of the Nile (from Drag)	—	Brunswick	
1929	Painting The Clouds With Sunshine	2	Vitaphone	Over 1 Millon Copies Sold
1929	Tiptoe Thru The Tulips	1	Vitaphone	Over 1 Millon Copies Sold Stayed At No. 1 for 10 Weeks
1929	In A Kitchenette (from Gold Diggers of Broadway)	—	Vitaphone	
1929	Go To Bed (from Gold Diggers of Broadway)	—	Vitaphone	
1929	What Will I Do Without You (from Gold Diggers of Broadway)	—	Vitaphone	
1929	Just Another Kiss	—	Brunswick	
1929	Your Mother and Mine	—	Brunswick	
1929	Singin' In The Rain	—	Brunswick	
1929	When My Dreams Come True	—	Brunswick	
1929	Li-Po-Li (from The Show of Shows)	—	Vitaphone	
1929	Lady Luck (from The Show of Shows)	—	Vitaphone	
1929	The Only Song I Know (from The Show of Shows)	—	Vitaphone	
1930	Dancing with Tears in My Eyes	—	Brunswick	
1930	Telling It To The Daisies	15	Brunswick	
1930	Singing a Song to the Stars	—	Brunswick	
1930	My Heart Belongs to the Girl Who Belongs to Somebody Else	—	Brunswick	
1930	Just a Little Closer	—	Brunswick	
1930	Don't Tell Her What's Happened to Me	—	Brunswick	
1930	The Kiss Waltz	—	Brunswick	
1930	Go Home and Tell Your Mother	—	Brunswick	
1930	Siboney	—	Brunswick	
1930	Wasting My Love on You	—	Brunswick	
1930	Maybe It's Love	—	Brunswick	
1930	You're Driving Me Crazy	7	Brunswick	
1930	I Miss a Little Miss(Who Misses Me in Southern Tennessee)	—	Brunswick	
1930	Lady Play Your Mandolin	5	Brunswick	
1930	Say Hello to the Folks Back Home	—	Brunswick	
1931	You Didn't Have to Tell Me(I Knew It All the Time)	—	Brunswick	
1931	Hello! Beautiful	—	Brunswick	
1931	When You Were the Blossom of Buttercup Lane and I Was Your Little Blue Boy	—	Brunswick	
1931	Walkin' My Baby Back Home	8	Brunswick	
1931	Falling In Love Again	—	Brunswick	
1931	Running Between The Raindrops	—	Brunswick	
1931	Wabash Moon	—	Brunswick	
1931	Can't You Read Between the Lines	—	Brunswick	
1931	Boy! Oh! Boy! Oh! Boy! I've Got It Bad	—	Brunswick	
1931	Now You're In My Arms	—	Brunswick	
1931	I Surrender, Dear	—	Brunswick	
1931	That's My Desire	—	Brunswick	
1931	When the Moon Comes Over The Mountain	7	Brunswick	
1931	Goodnight, Sweetheart	—	Brunswick	
1932	An Evening in Caroline	—	Hit of The Week	
1932	All of Me/Goodnight Ladies	—	Hit of The Week	
1932	Picking the Guitar	—	Brunswick	
1932	Teasing the Frets	—	Brunswick	
1932	I'm Sure of Everything But You	—	Brunswick	
1932	More Beautiful Than Ever	—	Brunswick	
1932	Till Tomorrow	—	Brunswick	
1932	I Called to Say Goodnight	—	Brunswick	
1934	Love Thy Neighbor	—	Brunswick	
1934	A Thousand Good Nights	—	Brunswick	
1934	Carry Me Back to the Lone Prairie	—	Brunswick	
1934	Goin' Home	—	Brunswick	
1934	Moon Glow	—	Brunswick	
1934	For All We Know	—	Brunswick	
1936	Cling To Me	—	Universal	
1936	There's Always A Happy Ending	—	Universal	
1936	Play It, Mr. Charlie	—	Universal	
1936	I'll Stand By	—	Universal	
1936	Mutiny In The Park	—	Universal	
1936	I Want to Go Where You Go	—	Universal	
1936	My Blue Heaven	—	Universal	
1936	It Looks Like Rain In Cherry Blossom Lane	—	C. P. MacGregor	
1936	You'll Never Get To Heaven	—	C. P. MacGregor	
1936	Till The Clock Strikes Three	—	C. P. MacGregor	
1936	The Moon Got In My Eyes	—	C. P. MacGregor	
1936	A Sailboat In the Moonlight	—	C. P. MacGregor	
1936	The Dream In My Heart	—	C. P. MacGregor	
1936	We Can't Go On This Way	—	C. P. MacGregor	
1936	Strangers In The Dark	—	C. P. MacGregor	
1936	Tiptoe Thru The Tulips	—	C. P. MacGregor	
1936	Side by Side	—	C. P. MacGregor	
1936	Little Old Fashioned Music Box	—	C. P. MacGregor	
1936	The Miller's Daughter Marianne	—	C. P. MacGregor	
1936	Tomorrow Is Another Day	—	C. P. MacGregor	
1936	Gone With The Wind	—	C. P. MacGregor	
1936	My Cabin of Dreams	—	C. P. MacGregor	
1936	When I Look at You	—	C. P. MacGregor	
1936	Pickin' The Guitar	—	C. P. MacGregor	
1936	Vieni, Vieni	—	C. P. MacGregor	
1936	You Can't Stop Me from Dreaming	—	C. P. MacGregor	
1936	In A Little Carolina Town	—	C. P. MacGregor	
1936	Please Pardon Us We're in Love	—	C. P. MacGregor	
1939	An Apple for the Teacher	—	Columbia	
1939	A Man and His Dream	—	Columbia	
1939	Go Fly a Kite	—	Columbia	
1939	Good Morning	—	Columbia	
1939	Over the Rainbow	—	Columbia	
1939	The Man With A Mandolin	—	Columbia	
1941	Maria Elana	—	NBC	
1944	Tiptoe Thru The Tulips	—	Soundies	
1944	Side By Side	—	Soundies	
1944	Goodnight, Wherever You Are	—	Soundies	
1944	An Hour Never Passes	—	Soundies	
1944	Tiptoe Thru The Tulips	—	Audio-Scriptions	
1944	Side by Side	—	Audio-Scriptions	
1944	Tiptoe Thru The Tulips	—	Premier/Mercury	
1944	Always	—	Premier/Mercury	
1945	My Blue Heaven	—	Sellers	
1945	It's Been A Long, Long Time	—	Sellers	
1946	Sleepy Time Gal	—	C. P. MacGregor	
1946	I'm Looking Over a Four Leaf Clover	—	C. P. MacGregor	
1946	In A Little Spanish Town	—	C. P. MacGregor	
1946	Three Little Words	—	C. P. MacGregor	
1946	Oh, How I Miss You Tonight	—	C. P. MacGregor	
1946	Always	—	C. P. MacGregor	
1946	It Looks Like Rain In Cherry Blossom Lane	—	C. P. MacGregor	
1946	I'll Get By	—	C. P. MacGregor	
1946	The Song Is Ended	—	C. P. MacGregor	
1946	Mexicali Rose	—	C. P. MacGregor	
1946	Painting The Clouds With Sunshine	—	C. P. MacGregor	
1946	Tangerine	—	C. P. MacGregor	
1946	The Gay Ranchero	—	C. P. MacGregor	
1946	Minnie The Mermaid	—	C. P. MacGregor	
1946	Just Like A Melody From Out of the Sky	—	C. P. MacGregor	
1946	You Are Everything I Love	—	C. P. MacGregor	
1946	Among My Souvenirs	—	C. P. MacGregor	
1946	Charley My Boy	—	C. P. MacGregor	
1946	Broken Hearted	—	C. P. MacGregor	
1946	Coax Me a Little Bit	—	Diamond	
1946	If I Had My Way	—	Diamond	
1946	What You Gonna Do?	—	Diamond	
1946	Painting The Clouds With Sunshine	—	Diamond	
1946	Seems Like Old Times	—	Diamond	
1946	Give My Heart a Break	—	Diamond	
1946	My Blue Heaven	—	Diamond	
1946	Everyone Is Looking For the Rainbow	—	Diamond	
1947	Tiptoe Through the Tulips	—	Audiodisc	
1947	Open Up That Door	—	Audiodisc	
1948	Tiptoe Through the Tulips	—	Huckster/Capitol	
1948	Side by Side	—	Huckster/Capitol	
1948	Bye Bye Blackbird	—	Huckster/Capitol	
1948	Broken Hearted	—	Huckster/Capitol	
1948	Brown Eyes, Why Are You Blue	—	Huckster/Capitol	
1948	I Miss You Most of All(The Chair's in the Parlor)	—	Huckster/Capitol	
1948	Don't Gamble With Romance	—	Capitol	
1948	Tea Time on the Thames	—	Capitol	
1949	Bye Bye Blackbird	—	Capitol	
1949	Don't Call Me Sweetheart Anymore	—	Capitol	

1951-1981
Year	Title	Label
1951	Bela Bimba	Snader
1951	Mexicali Rose	Snader
1951	Walking My Baby Back Home	Snader
1951	I Love The Sunshine of Your Smile	Snader
1951	Get Out Those Old Records	Snader
1951	Marie, Oh Marie	Snader
1951	Looking At The World Thru Rose Colored Glasses	Snader
1954	Looking At The World Thru Rose Colored Glasses	Crown
1955	Did You Ever See a Dream Walking?	Crown
1955	Bella Nonna(Little Grandmother)	Accent
1955	Paper Roses	Accent
1955	Kind and Considerate	Accent
1955	Soldier's Guitar	Accent
1955	Pasta Cheech	Accent
1955	Not Guilty	Accent
1964	Hello Dolly	Accent
1964	Tiptoe Through The Tulips	Accent
1964	While We Danced at the Mardi Gras	Accent
1964	Can't We Talk It Over?	Accent
1966	Darling, I Love You	Accent
1966	It's Been A Good Life	Accent
1967	Worryin'	Accent
1967	Brown Eyes, Why Are You Blue	Accent
1967	I'm Blue for You	Accent
1967	Our San Diego	Accent
1974	When You and I Were Seventeen	Paramount
1974	Five Foot Two, Eyes of Blue	Paramount
1974	I'm Gonna Charleston Back to Charleston	Paramount
1974	Tiptoe Thru The Tulips	Accent
1974	Silver Sails	Accent
1974	I Wished on the Moon	Paramount
1975	I'll See You In My Dreams	MGM
1975	We'll Make Hay While the Sun Shines	MGM
1975	My Blue Heaven	MGM
1975	Happy Days Are Here Again	MGM
1975	Ja Da	MGM
1975	Wang Wang Blues	MGM
1976	To Be Loved by You	Paramount
1976	They're Playing Our Song(Won Ton Rag)	Paramount
1980	Are You Lonesome Tonight	Accent
1980	How Did You Have the Heart to Break My Heart?	Accent
1981	The Magic Waltz	Accent
