= Painting the Clouds with Sunshine (film) =

1951 film by David Butler

- Directed by: David Butler
- Written by: Harry Clork; Roland Kibbee; Peter Milne; Avery Hopwood (Play)
- Produced by: William Jacobs
- Starring: Dennis Morgan; Virginia Mayo; Gene Nelson
- Cinematography: Wilfred M. Cline
- Edited by: Irene Morra
- Music by: Howard Jackson (uncredited)
- Distributed by: Warner Bros. Pictures
- Release date: October 10, 1951
- Running time: 87 minutes
- Country: United States
- Language: English
- Box office: $1.8 million (US rentals)

Painting the Clouds with Sunshine is a 1951 Technicolor musical film directed by David Butler and starring Dennis Morgan and Virginia Mayo (whose singing voice was dubbed by Bonnie Lou Williams). The film is the fourth musical film adaptation of the 1919 play The Gold Diggers by Avery Hopwood, following The Gold Diggers (1923), Gold Diggers of Broadway (1929) and Gold Diggers of 1933 (1933). The film is a jukebox musical featuring popular songs from the 1910s to 1930s, including two songs from Gold Diggers of Broadway ("Painting the Clouds with Sunshine" and "Tiptoe Through the Tulips") and one song from Gold Diggers of 1933 ("We're in the Money").

== Plot ==
Three smart Las Vegas theatrical girls seek husbands. Carol wants a millionaire, Abby is in love with baritone Vince Nichols but is upset with his gambling and June has a crush on dancer Ted Lansing. However, Ted is in love with Abby.

== Cast ==
- Dennis Morgan as Vince Nichols
- Virginia Mayo as Carol
- Gene Nelson as Thedore (Ted) Lansing
- Lucille Norman as Abby
- S.Z. Sakall as Felix "Uncle Felix" Hoff
- Virginia Gibson as June
- Tom Conway as Bennington Lansing a.k.a. Uncle Benny
- Wallace Ford as Sam Parks

== Songs ==
- "Painting the Clouds with Sunshine" and "Tiptoe Through the Tulips", music and lyrics by Joe Burke and Al Dubin
  - Sung by Dennis Morgan and Lucille Norman
- "Man Is a Necessary Evil" and "The Mambo Man", music by Sonny Burke, lyrics by Jack Elliott
- "Vienna Dreams", music by Rudolf Sieczynski, lyrics by Irving Caesar
- "We're in the Money", music and lyrics by Harry Warren and Al Dubin
- "When Irish Eyes Are Smiling", music and lyrics by Ernest R. Ball, Chauncey Olcott and George Graff Jr.
- "With a Song in My Heart", music by Richard Rodgers, lyrics by Lorenz Hart
- "The Birth of the Blues", music and lyrics by Ray Henderson, B. G. DeSylva and Lew Brown
- "You're My Everything", music and lyrics by Harry Warren, Mort Dixon and Joe Young
- "Jalousie 'Tango Tzigane'", music and lyrics by Jacob Gade and Vera Bloom
- "I Like the Mountain Music", music and lyrics by Frank Weldon and James Cavanaugh

== Reception ==
In a contemporary review for The New York Times, critic Howard Thompson called the film a "feeble excuse for a musical romance" and wrote: "Judging by 'Painting the Clouds with Sunshine,' the latest in the never-ending parade of Technicolor musical romances from Warners, the studio is really scraping the barrel. These films are usually tuneful, pleasant-hued and designed for the sole and harmless purpose of supplying a little escapist relief and there's no point in aiming a sling at the new one. But we'll wager that even the staunchest supporters of Dennis Morgan, Virginia Mayo and Gene Nelson will wince at the banal, wafer-thin goings-on ..."
