= Oh, How I Miss You Tonight =

Single by Jeanne Black
- B-side: "A Little Bit Lonely"
- Released: December 1960
- Genre: Pop
- Length: 2:56
- Label: Capitol
- Songwriters: Benny Davis, Joe Burke, Mark Fisher

Jeanne Black singles chronology
"You'll Find Out" (1960)	"Oh, How I Miss You Tonight" (1960)	"Don't Speak to Me" (1961)

"Oh, How I Miss You Tonight" is a popular song, published in 1925, written by Benny Davis, Joe Burke, and Mark Fisher. Popular recordings of the song in 1925 were by Ben Selvin, Benson Orchestra of Chicago, Lewis James and Irving Kaufman.

== Other notable recordings ==
- 1941 Bing Crosby - recorded July 5, 1941 for Decca Records with John Scott Trotter and His Orchestra.
- 1947 Perry Como - recorded on November 20, 1947 for RCA Victor with Russ Case and His Orchestra.
- 1960 Jeanne Black released a version of the song as a single which reached No. 63 on the U.S. pop chart.
- 1961 Jim Reeves
- 1961 Glenda Collins - Decca F11321
- 1962 Frank Sinatra - included in his album All Alone.
- 1962 Nat King Cole - for his album Dear Lonely Hearts.
- 1963 Frank Fontaine ABC-Paramount 45 RPM Single
- 1964 Burl Ives - for the album My Gal Sal
- 1965 Bobby Vinton on his album, Bobby Vinton Sings for Lonely Nights.
- 1967 Doris Day - included in her album The Love Album.
