= Rambling Rose (1948 song) =

Song by Perry Como (original)
- B-side: "There Must Be a Way (US issue), Larry Larry Lilli Bolero (UK issue)"
- Published: 1947
- Recorded: December 30, 1947
- Genre: Popular music, standard
- Label: RCA Victor - 20-2947 (US release), His Master's Voice BD - 1211 (UK release)
- Songwriter: Joseph McCarthy
- Composer: Joe Burke

"Rambling Rose" is a popular song.

The music was written by Joe Burke, the lyrics by Joseph McCarthy. The song was published in 1947.

== Recordings ==
The song was recorded by Perry Como on December 30, 1947. The recording was released by RCA Victor as catalog number 20-2947, with the flip side "There Must Be A Way." The recording spent 14 weeks on the Billboard chart, beginning July 23, 1948, peaking at position #18. The record was also released in the United Kingdom by His Master's Voice as catalog number BD-1211, with the flip side "Laroo Laroo Lilli Bolero."

The song was also recorded by Gordon MacRae on July 23, 1948. The recording was released by Capitol Records as catalog number 15178. The recording spent one week (October 15) on the Billboard chart, at position No. 27. George Paxton and his Orchestra also recorded the song; a photograph of Paxton is featured on the song's sheet music published in 1948.
