= Lee Andrews & the Hearts =

American vocal group

Lee Andrews and the Hearts were an American doo-wop quintet from Philadelphia, Pennsylvania, United States, formed in 1953. They recorded on the Gotham, Rainbow, Mainline, Chess, United Artists, Grand and Gowen labels. Managed by Kae Williams, in 1957 and 1958 they had their three biggest hits, "Tear Drops", "Long Lonely Nights" and "Try the Impossible".

== Members ==
The group consisted of Lee Andrews (lead), Roy Calhoun (first tenor), Thomas "Butch" Curry (second tenor), Ted Weems (baritone) and Wendell Calhoun (bass).

Lee Andrews was born Arthur Lee Andrews Thompson on June 2, 1936, in Goldsboro, North Carolina. He was the father of Ahmir 'Questlove' Thompson and singer songwriter Donn T. He was the son of a singer, Beachy Thompson of the gospel music group The Dixie Hummingbirds. Andrews died on March 16, 2016, at the age of 79.

== Discography ==
=== Albums ===
- Dean Tyler Presents Lee Andrews and the Hearts - Live on Stage (1965) Lost Nite Records

=== Compilation Albums ===
- The Very Best Of Lee Andrews and The Hearts (2002) Collectables Records

=== Singles ===
- "Maybe You'll Be There" (1954 Rainbow Records) U.S. Doo Wop (with b-side: "Baby Come Back")
- "Long Lonely Nights" (1957 Chess Records) U.S. Pop #45, R&B #11 (with b-side: "The Clock")
- "Tear Drops" (1958 Chess Records) U.S. Pop #20, R&B #4 (with b-side: "Girl Around the Corner")
- "Try the Impossible" (1958 United Artists Records) U.S. #33
- "Why Do I" (1958 United Artists Records) U.S. Doo Wop
- "Maybe You'll Be There" (1958 United Artists Records) U.S. Soul (with b-side "All I Ask Is Love")
- "Together Again" (1958 Gowen Records) U.S. Doo Wop (with b-side "My Lonely Room")
- "Glad to Be Here" (1958 United Artists Records)
- "Island of Love" (1961 Crimson Records) U.S. Soul (with b-side "Oh My Love")
- "The White Cliffs of Dover" (1962 Lost Nite Records) U.S. Doo Wop (with b-side "Much Too Much")
- "Bells of St. Mary" (1962 Lost Nite Records) U.S. Doo Wop (with b-side: "Much to Much)"
- "Just Suppose" (1963 Lost Nite Records) U.S. Doo Wop (with b-side: "It's Me")
- "Bluebird of Happiness" (1963 Lost Nite Records) U.S. Doo Wop (with b-side: "Show Me the Merengue")
- "Lonely Room" (1963 Lost Nite Records) U.S. Doo Wop (with b-side: "Leona")
- "Nobody's Home" (1964 Lana Records) U.S. Doo Wop (with b-side: "Try the Impossible")
- "Quiet as It's Kept" (1966 RCA Victor) U.S. Soul (with b-side: "You're Taking a Long Time Coming Back")
- "Never the Less" (1967 Lost Nite Records) U.S. Soul (with b-side: "Island of Love")
- "Sippin' on a Cup of Coffee" (1967 Dionn Records) U.S. Soul (co-writer with The OrdellS)
- "Cold Gray Dawn" (1968 Lost Nite Records) U.S. Soul (with b-side: "All You Can Do"
- "Can't Do Without You" (1968 Lost Nite Records) U.S. Soul (with b-side: "Oh My Love")
- "Long, Lonely Nights" (1973 Chess Records) U.S. Doo Wop (with b-side: Teardrops")
- "I've Had It" (1998 Goldmine Soul Supply) U.S. Soul (with b-side: "She's Wanted")
- "Not My Girl" (2000 T. B. Super Soul) U.S. Soul (with b-side: "I've Had It")
