= Drive-In Movie Time =

Studio album by Bobby Vinton
- Released: August 1965
- Genre: Pop
- Length: 30:35
- Label: Epic
- Producer: Bob Morgan

Bobby Vinton chronology
Bobby Vinton Sings for Lonely Nights (1965)	Drive-In Movie Time (1965)	Bobby Vinton Sings Satin Pillows and Careless (1966)

Drive-In Movie Time: Bobby Vinton Sings Great Motion Picture Themes is Bobby Vinton's twelfth studio album, released by Epic Records in August 1965. Consisting entirely of songs from films, it was recorded and released to capitalize on Vinton's latest single at the time, "Theme from 'Harlow' (Lonely Girl)". All of the songs are from films that were released during the 1950s and 1960s.

== Critical reception ==
The album received positive reviews upon its release. Billboard magazine believed that "Although the material has been recorded by many vocalists, Vinton adds his own unique delivery bringing freshness to each selection," adding: "'Theme From a Summer Place' and 'Moon River' fit the successful Vinton style perfectly." Cashbox said in its "Pop Picks" reviews that a "dozen movie themes provide the fare for an other sparkling presentation from Bobby Vinton."

== Chart performance and singles ==
The album entered the Record World 100 Top LP's chart in the issue dated September 25, 1965, peaking at No. 99 the following week. The single, "Theme from 'Harlow' (Lonely Girl)" debuted on the Billboard Hot 100 on July 10, 1965, reaching No. 61 during a five-week run on it.

== Track listing ==
Side 1
No.	Title	Writer(s)	Length
1.	"Chim Chim Cher-ee" (From Mary Poppins)	Richard M. Sherman, Robert B. Sherman	2:50
2.	"Around the World" (From Around the World in 80 Days)	Harold Adamson, Victor Young	2:15
3.	"Theme from "A Summer Place""	Mack Discant, Max Steiner	2:27
4.	"Goldfinger" (From Goldfinger)	Leslie Bricusse, Anthony Newley, John Barry	1:54
5.	"Moon River" (From Breakfast at Tiffany's)	Johnny Mercer, Henry Mancini	3:45
6.	"Never on Sunday" (From Never on Sunday)	Billy Towne, Manos Hadjidakis	2:34

Side 2
No.	Title	Writer(s)	Length
1.	"More" (From Mondo Cane)	Norman Newell, Nino Oliviero, Riz Ortolani	2:07
2.	"The Song from Moulin Rouge (Where Is Your Heart)" (From Moulin Rouge)	William Engvick, Georges Auric	2:35
3.	"From Russia with Love" (From From Russia with Love)	Lionel Bart	2:12
4.	"Theme from "Harlow" (Lonely Girl)"	Jay Livingston, Ray Evans, Neal Hefti	2:20
5.	"The Exodus Song" (From Exodus)	Pat Boone, Ernest Gold	2:45
6.	"Dear Heart" (From Dear Heart)	Jay Livingston, Ray Evans, Henry Mancini	2:51

== Personnel ==
All credits are adapted from the liner notes of Drive-In Movie Time.

- Bobby Vinton – vocals
- Bob Morgan – producer
- Cardell of Pittsburgh – cover photos
- Henry Parker – cover photos

== Charts ==
Album – Record World (United States)

Chart (1965)	Peak position
US Record World 100 Top LP's	99

Singles – Billboard (United States)

Single	Year	Chart	Peak position
"Theme from 'Harlow' (Lonely Girl)"	1965	Billboard Hot 100	61
