= Satin Pillows =

Single by Bobby Vinton

from the album Bobby Vinton Sings Satin Pillows and Careless
- B-side: "Careless"
- Released: November 12, 1965
- Recorded: October 20, 1965
- Genre: Pop music
- Length: 2:26
- Label: Epic Records
- Songwriters: Sonny James & Robert Tubert
- Producer: Bob Morgan

Bobby Vinton singles chronology
"What Color (Is a Man)" (1965)	"Satin Pillows" (1965)	"Tears" (1966)

"Satin Pillows" is a song written by Sonny James & Robert Tubert, which was released by Bobby Vinton in 1965. The song spent 10 weeks on the Billboard Hot 100 chart, peaking at No. 23, while reaching No. 3 on Canada's "RPM Play Sheet".

== Chart performance ==
Chart (1965–66)	Peak position
US Billboard Hot 100	23
Canada - RPM Play Sheet	3
