= So Blue (De Sylva, Brown and Henderson song) =

Single by Vincent Lopez and His Casa Lopez Orchestra
- A-side: "What Does It Matter?"
- Published: 1927
- Released: 1927
- Recorded: February 21, 1927
- Genre: Traditional pop
- Length: 3:11
- Label: Brunswick
- Composers: Ray Henderson, Helen Crawford
- Lyricists: Buddy DeSylva, Lew Brown

"So Blue" is a 1927 song written by Buddy DeSylva, Lew Brown, and Ray Henderson. The song has been covered by numerous artists and popular recordings in 1927 were by Paul Whiteman (vocal by Austin Young), Vincent Lopez (vocal by Frank Munn) and by Nick Lucas.

== Other versions ==
- Vera Lynn - on her album Vera Lynn Sings...Songs of the Twenties (1959).
- Peggy Lee, on her album Dream Street (1957)
- John Warren's Strictempo Orchestra 1959,
- The Cambridge Strings
- Phil Tate And His Orchestra 1959
- The Diplomats, in a Vitaphone short
- The Vibrations 1960
