= Long Lonely Nights =

Single by Lee Andrews & the Hearts
- B-side: "The Clock"
- Released: 1957
- Genre: Doo wop
- Length: 2:55
- Label: Main Line
- Songwriter: Lee Andrews

Lee Andrews & the Hearts singles chronology
"Just Suppose" (1956)	"Long Lonely Nights" (1957)	"Tear Drops" (1957)

"Long Lonely Nights" is a song that was originally released by Lee Andrews & the Hearts in 1957. Hit versions were also released by Clyde McPhatter, later in 1957, and Bobby Vinton in 1965. The song was written by Lee Andrews, though Larry Brown (as Abbott), Doug Henderson, and Mimi Uniman were given songwriter credit as well, in a practice that was common at the time.

== 1957 versions ==
Lee Andrews & the Hearts' version was released as a single in 1957. It was originally released on the Philadelphia based Main Line Records label, before being released on the Chess label, which was able to give it wider distribution. It reached No. 45 on Billboard's "Top 100 Sides" chart, and No. 11 on Billboard's chart of "Most Played R&B by Jockeys".

Clyde McPhatter's version was released as a single in 1957. It reached No. 49 on Billboard's "Top 100 Sides" chart, while reaching No. 1 on Billboard's chart of "Most Played R&B by Jockeys", and No. 9 on Billboard's chart of "R&B Best Sellers in Stores". In 1958, McPhatter released the song on his album Love Ballads.

The song also reached No. 33 on the Cash Box Top 60 in 1957, in a tandem ranking of Lee Andrews & the Hearts, Clyde McPhatter, Kitty Kallen, and The Kings' versions, with Lee Andrews & the Hearts and Clyde McPhatter's versions marked as bestsellers, while reaching No. 27 on Cash Box's chart of "The Records Disc Jockeys Played Most". It also reached No. 3 on Cash Box's R&B Top 20, in a tandem ranking of Lee Andrews & the Hearts and Clyde McPhatter's versions.

== Bobby Vinton version ==
"Long Lonely Nights"

Single by Bobby Vinton

from the album Bobby Vinton Sings for Lonely Nights
- B-side: "Satin"
- Released: Feb, 19, 1965
- Recorded: Feb. 4, 1965
- Genre: Pop
- Length: 2:27
- Label: Epic
- Songwriter: Lee Andrews

Bobby Vinton singles chronology
"Dearest Santa" (1964)	"Long Lonely Nights" (1965)	"L-O-N-E-L-Y" (1965)

Bobby Vinton released the most widely successful version of "Long Lonely Nights" in 1965 as a single and on the album Bobby Vinton Sings for Lonely Nights. Vinton's version spent 7 weeks on the Billboard Hot 100 chart, peaking at No. 17, while reaching No. 12 on Record World's "100 Top Pops", No. 14 on the Cash Box Top 100, No. 5 on Billboard's Middle-Road Singles chart, and No. 5 on Canada's "RPM Play Sheet".

== Other versions ==
The Dells released a cover of "Long Lonely Nights" in 1970, as a single and on the album Like It Is, Like It Was. It spent four weeks on the Billboard Hot 100, reaching No. 74, while reaching No. 27 on Billboard's Soul Singles chart, No. 60 on Record World's "100 Top Pops", No. 13 on Record World's "Top 50 R&B", and No. 70 on the Cash Box Top 100.
