= L-O-N-E-L-Y =

Single by Bobby Vinton

from the album Bobby Vinton Sings for Lonely Nights
- B-side: "Graduation Tears"
- Released: April 19, 1965
- Recorded: March 12, 1965
- Genre: Pop
- Length: 2:24
- Label: Epic
- Songwriter: Bobby Vinton
- Producer: Bob Morgan

Bobby Vinton singles chronology
"Long Lonely Nights" (1965)	"L-O-N-E-L-Y" (1965)	"Theme from 'Harlow' (Lonely Girl)" (1965)

"L-O-N-E-L-Y" is a song written and sung by Bobby Vinton, which he released in 1965. The song spent 8 weeks on the Billboard Hot 100 chart, peaking at No. 22, while reaching No. 7 on Billboard's Pop-Standards Singles chart, and No. 1 on Canada's "RPM Play Sheet".

Cash Box described it as "a lyrical, slow-moving heartfelt tearjerker on which the chanter plaintively offers six reasons for his unhappiness."

== Chart performance ==
Chart (1965)	Peak position
Canada - RPM Play Sheet	1
US Billboard Hot 100	22
US Billboard Pop-Standard Singles	7
US Cash Box Top 100	20
US Record World 100 Top Pops	16
