= Lucille Norman =

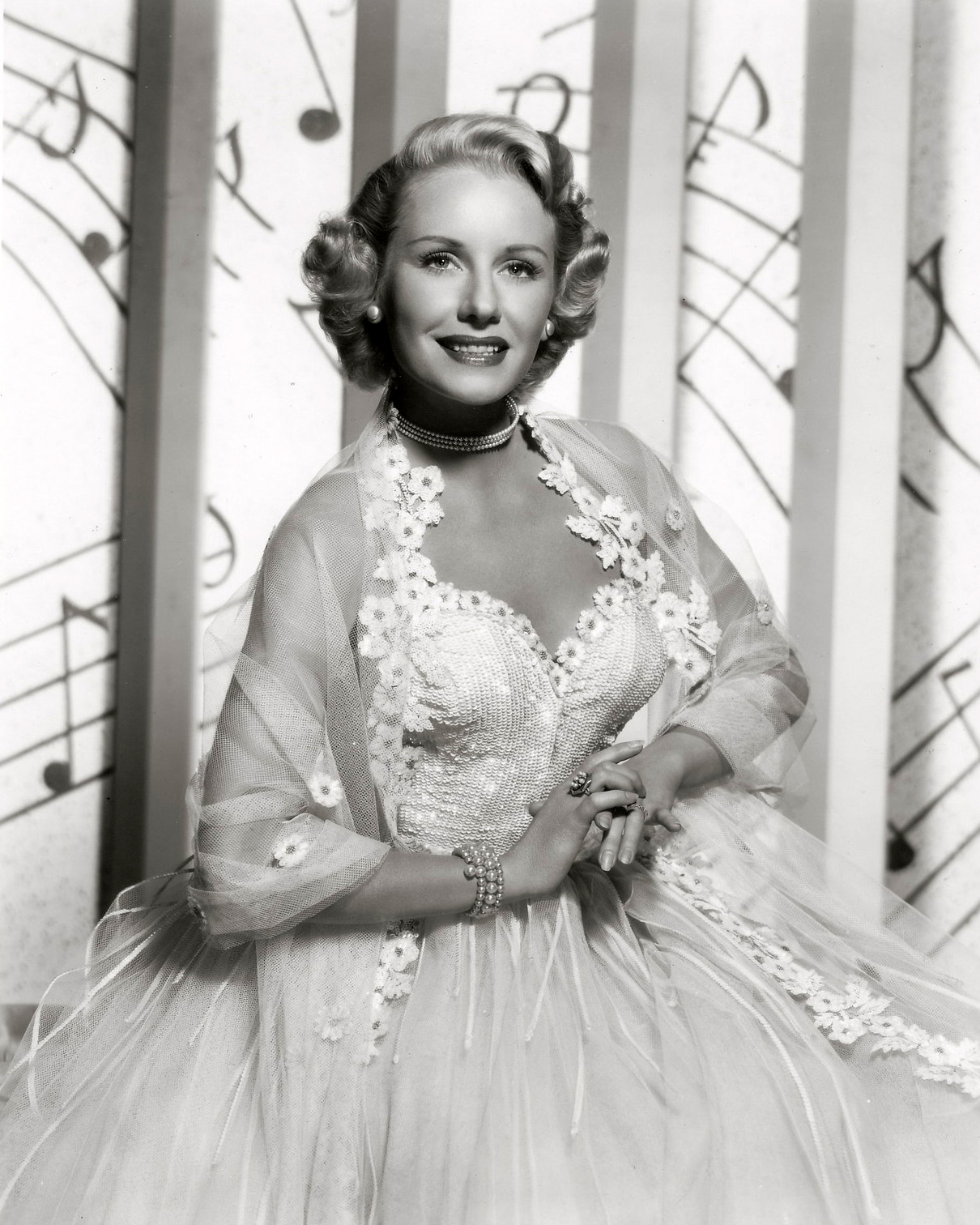
- Lucille Norman, 1950

Background information
- Born: Lucille Pharaby Boileau; June 15, 1921; Lincoln, Nebraska, U.S
- Died: April 1, 1998 (aged 76) Glendale, California, U.S
- Genres: Traditional pop; show tunes, opera
- Occupations: Singer, actress, radio personality
- Years active: 1942–1962
- Label: Capitol Records

Lucille Norman (born Lucille Pharaby Boileau; June 15, 1921 – April 1, 1998) was an American mezzo-soprano, radio personality, and stage and film actress active in the 1940s and 1950s.

== Early life ==
When Noirman was 15 years old, she won a contest at resulted in her becoming a singer on radio station KLZ in Denver, Colorado. That was her first job, and that same summer she sang with the Colorado symphony. She appeared on the Metropolitan Opera Auditions of the Air on December 7, 1941, singing an aria from Orfeo ed Euridice by Gluck.

== MGM films ==
Norman's first film roles were in 1942. First, an uncredited part in the film Personalities, which was a vehicle that MGM used to showcase their new stars. Then she and Gene Kelly both made their official screen debuts singing and dancing with Judy Garland in the MGM film For Me and My Gal.

Fate intervened in interrupting her Hollywood film career, and she next performed on the Broadway stage. Fred F. Finklehoffe, the film's co-writer, was so impressed with Norman's abilities that he offered her the leading role in his new vaudeville-type show called Show Time, already a hit in Los Angeles. Norman replaced Kitty Carlisle in New York and found herself a featured artist performing songs and comedy with Jack Haley and George Jessel (342 performances Sept 16, 1942, through April 3, 1943).

== The war years ==
Norman spent much of the war years as a radio singer. In August 1944, courtesy of MGM, Norman entertained the troops, starring in a production of Roberta at Camp Roberts, California, a production where she met her future husband, Bruce Kellogg. Although he had acted in about 15 films, his full-time occupation was operating his 15,000-acre ranch near Cody, Wyoming. They were married in Las Vegas on February 6, 1945, and he also became her agent and business manager. She and Kellogg had one child together, a daughter, Pamela, and remained married until his death. Her husband's efforts played a critical role in getting her accepted in radio, because she was initially regarded as an opera singer.

During WWII, the Kelloggs sent word to all of the government hospitals that they would give work on their Wyoming ranch to wounded warriors that needed the "rehabilitation that can be found in healthy, out-of-doors employment. Dozens of veterans took advantage of the offer and profited by it." The Kelloggs also extended the same offer to veterans of the Korean War. After the war, Lucille Norman next appeared in film as a specialty singer in the 1946 film short, Musical Masterpieces.

== Radio ==
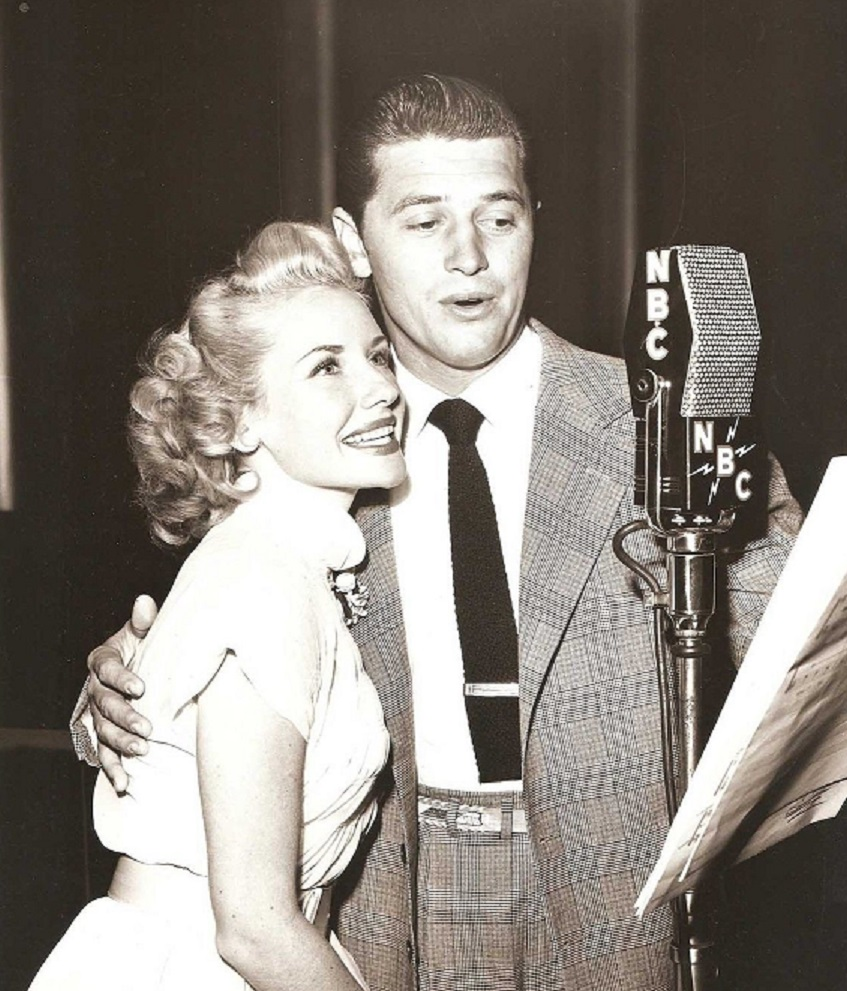
Lucille Norman & Gordon MacRae, The Railroad Hour, 1950

Her most memorable roles as a singer came through her national radio appearances. Foremost were her appearances on The Railroad Hour, with show host Gordon MacRae. The Railroad Hour was a weekly half-hour anthology series featuring condensed versions of hit Broadway shows. One of his most frequent guest artists, Norman made 73 appearances (some as summer hostess while MacRae was on vacation) on the show between 1948 and 1954. She also starred as mistress of ceremonies of her own half-hour CBS radio show on the West Coast, the Hollywood Music Hall. On October 21, 1952, Norman celebrated the fourth anniversary of the show

Although the literature is unclear about the number of episodes, Norman's Hollywood Music Hall also debuted as a proposed television series in 1953, featuring the Victor Young Orchestra. Norman was seen on various television shows originating in Southern California. She and her husband appeared under a one-year contract for a television series in 1951.

== Concert stage ==
In 1949, Norman starred with John Raitt in the musical The New Moon at the Greek Theatre in Los Angeles. She made five starring concert appearances at The Hollywood Bowl, including an annual Gershwin concert. Her appearance as soloist at the March 24, 1951, Easter Sunrise Service at the Bowl (with 2 choirs and the Werner Jenssen Symphony Orchestra) was attended by 20,000 people. She also performed as soloist with John Boles at the Easter Concert at the Carmel Valley Bowl on April 4, 1954, for an audience of 15,000. She performed in various supper clubs in Las Vegas and Colorado Springs, Colorado.

Norman was also the lead singer and star of the Fiesta del Pacifico in 1957. The San Diego summer spectacular featured a cast of 1300 persons in the Meredith Willson production of "The California Story." In 1956, she was named Top Vocalist of the Year by the Southern California Music Trade Association.

== Warner Bros. films ==
Norman returned to Hollywood acting and singing under contract with Warner Brothers Pictures in 1951 as Abby in Painting the Clouds with Sunshine and she played herself in Starlift. She also appeared in Sweethearts on Parade in 1953. Her most notable straight dramatic role was in 1952 starring opposite Randolph Scott in the western film Carson City.

Her last acting appearance was in the television series The Colgate Comedy Hour, in which she appeared in a 1955 episode. Lucille Norman co-starred with Italian tenor Aldo Monaco on the TV special Songs of Christmas in 1963. Carmen Dragon provided the musical direction conducting The Glendale Symphony Orchestra.

== Discography ==
Lucille Norman's discography is notable for a number of studio cast recordings of popular operettas that she made with Dennis Morgan, Gordon MacRae and other artists that have remained popular and all have been reissued as CDs.

- 1938 - I Married an Angel, studio cast with Gordon MacRae (reissued on AEI CD-1150, 1985)
- 1942 - For Me and My Gal, MGM Soundtrack with Judy Garland and Gene Kelly (Reissued by Sony UK CD 7638552, 2010);
- 1950 - The New Moon, studio cast with Gordon MacRae (Capitol H-217) LP
- 1950 - The Vagabond King, studio cast with Gordon MacRae (Capitol LCT-6000) LP
- 1951 - Painting the Clouds with Sunshine, Soundtrack with Dennis Morgan (Capitol L-291) LP
- 1952 - The Desert Song, studio cast with Gordon MacRae (Capitol L-351) LP (Note: The Desert Song charted #10 for one week in 1952.)
- 1952 - The Merry Widow, studio cast with Gordon MacRae (Capitol L-335) LP
- 1952 - Roberta, studio cast with Gordon MacRae (Capitol L-334)LP
- 1953 - The Desert Song/Roberta, studio casts with Gordon MacRae (Capitol P-384) LP
- 1954 - The Red Mill, 1954 studio cast with Gordon MacRae (Capitol L-530) LP
- 1955 - The Student Prince/The Merry Widow, studio casts with Gordon MacRae (Capitol T-437) (Note: The Student Prince soprano, and the Naughty Marietta soprano in these split releases were not Lucille Norman.)
- 1955 - Naughty Marietta/The Red Mill, studio casts with Gordon MacRae (Capitol T-551)
- 1956 - The Vagabond King/The New Moon, studio casts with Gordon MacRae (Capitol T-219) LP

VCR recordings

- 1942 For Me and My Gal, MGM with Judy Garland and Gene Kelly
- 1951 Painting the Clouds with Sunshine, Warner Brothers with Dennis Morgan and Virginia Mayo
- 1951 Starlift, Warner Brothers Filmcast with Doris Day and Gordon MacRae.
