= Joe Burke (composer) =

American composer (1884–1950)

- Born: Joseph Aloysius Burke; March 18, 1884; Philadelphia, Pennsylvania, U.S.
- Died: June 9, 1950 (aged 66) Upper Darby, Pennsylvania, U.S.
- Genre: Traditional pop
- Occupations: Composer, pianist
- Instruments: Piano, vocals
- Years active: c. 1915–1950

Joseph Aloysius Burke (March 18, 1884 – June 9, 1950) was an American composer and pianist. His successful songs, written with various lyricists, included "Down Honolulu Way" (1916), "Oh How I Miss You Tonight" (1924), "Tiptoe Through the Tulips" (1929), "Moon Over Miami" (1935), "Getting Some Fun Out of Life" (1937), "Moonlight on the Highway" (1937) and "Rambling Rose" (1948) and "Painting The Clouds With Sunshine" (1929)

== Life and career ==
Joe Burke was born in Philadelphia, Pennsylvania. He graduated from the Philadelphia Conservatory of Music and started as a pianist accompanying silent movies and an arranger in a music publishing firm. He also worked as a film actor, appearing in the 1915 silent movie The Senator. It was during this time that he started writing songs for publication. His first composition, "Down Honolulu Way", written with Earl Burtnett, was successful in 1916. In 1925, with lyricist Benny Davis, he wrote "Oh How I Miss You Tonight", recorded by Ben Selvin among others; and later, also with Davis, wrote "Carolina Moon", a hit for both Selvin and Gene Austin. As an actor, Burke appeared in the 1929 film The Show of Shows, and remained in Hollywood as a film score composer for several years.

Working in Hollywood with lyricist Al Dubin, Burke wrote "Tiptoe Through the Tulips", recorded most successfully by Nick Lucas, and originally written for the musical Gold Diggers of Broadway, as was "Painting the Clouds with Sunshine". Burke also collaborated with Dubin to write the Villanova University Alma Mater.

However, when their song "Dancing with Tears in My Eyes" was rejected by the film studio, Burke returned to New York City; the song became a hit for both Selvin and Nat Shilkret. During the mid-1930s, Burke wrote a string of hit songs with lyricist Edgar Leslie, including "On Treasure Island", "A Little Bit Independent", "In a Little Gypsy Tea Room", "Moon Over Miami", and "It Looks Like Rain in Cherry Blossom Lane", a 1937 hit for Guy Lombardo. He continued to work with both Leslie and Dubin, but had his final success in 1948, writing Perry Como's hit "Rambling Rose" with lyricist Joseph McCarthy.

Burke died at his home in Upper Darby, Pennsylvania in 1950, at the age of 66. He was posthumously inducted into the Songwriters Hall of Fame in 1970.

Other artists who have recorded his songs include Dean Martin, Kate Smith, Bing Crosby, Rosemary Clooney, Ray Charles, Fats Waller, Rudy Vallee, Doris Day, Frank Sinatra, Ricky Nelson, Twiggy, Chet Atkins, Eydie Gorme, and Tiny Tim.

== Selected works ==
=== Soundtracks ===
- Gold Diggers of Broadway (1929)
- Hearts in Exile (1929)
- Sally (1929)
- Little Johnny Jones
- She Couldn't Say No
- Hold Everything (1930)
- Dancing Sweeties
- Oh Sailor Behave (1930)
- Top Speed
- Sweethearts on Parade
- Big Boy and Palooka (also known as The Great Schnozzle)

=== Other songs ===
- "Carolina Moon" – Gene Austin (1929)
- "Tiptoe Through the Tulips" – Nick Lucas (1929)
- "Dancing With Tears in My Eyes" – Nat Shilkret (1930)
- "On Treasure Island" – Tommy Dorsey (1935)
- "Moon Over Miami" – Eddy Duchin (1936)
- "Rambling Rose" – Perry Como (1948)
- "Who Wouldn't Love You" – Kay Kyser (1942)
- "Baby Your Mother"
- "For You"
- "Yearning"
- "Oh, How I Miss You Tonight"
- "A Little Bit Independent"
- "In a Little Gypsy Tearoom"
- "It Looks Like Rain in Cherry Blossom Lane"
- "In the Valley of the Moon"
- "Painting the Clouds with Sunshine"
- "At a Perfume Counter"
- "By the River of the Roses"
- "The Kiss Waltz"
- "She Was Just a Sailor's Sweetheart"
- "Robins and Roses"
- "Cling To Me"
- "Midnight Blue"
- "We Must be Vigilant"
- "Villanova Alma Mater"
- "Getting Some Fun Out of Life"
- "There's a Little Picture Playhouse in My Heart"
- "No Wonder (That I Love You)"
- "I'd Rather be Your Sweetheart Than a Millionaire"
- "The Turkey Trot Glide"

== Bibliography ==
- Tin Pan Alley: The Composers, the Songs, the Performers and their Times by David A. Jasen, ISBN 9781556110993
