= Backstage musical =

Genre of musical theatre

A backstage musical is a genre of musical with a plot set in a theatrical context that revolves around the production of a play or musical revue. The film's narrative trajectory often comes to a halt one or more times to allow a performance. The songs performed in this context are considered diegetic numbers in that they occur literally in the plot, though they do not necessarily move the story forward.

The backstage musical was typified in the early films by director and choreographer Busby Berkeley, including 42nd Street (1933), Footlight Parade (1933), Dames (1934) and the Gold Diggers series (1933, 1935 and 1937), with examples in later films including Burlesque (2010) and A Star Is Born (2018).

Stage musicals that themselves have elements of backstage musicals include Show Boat (1927), Kiss Me, Kate (1948), The Band Wagon (1953), Gypsy (1959), Cabaret (1966), Follies (1971), A Chorus Line (1975), The Phantom of the Opera (1986), and Curtains.

== See also ==
- Metafiction
