= The Gold Diggers (1919 play) =

Play by Avery Hopwood

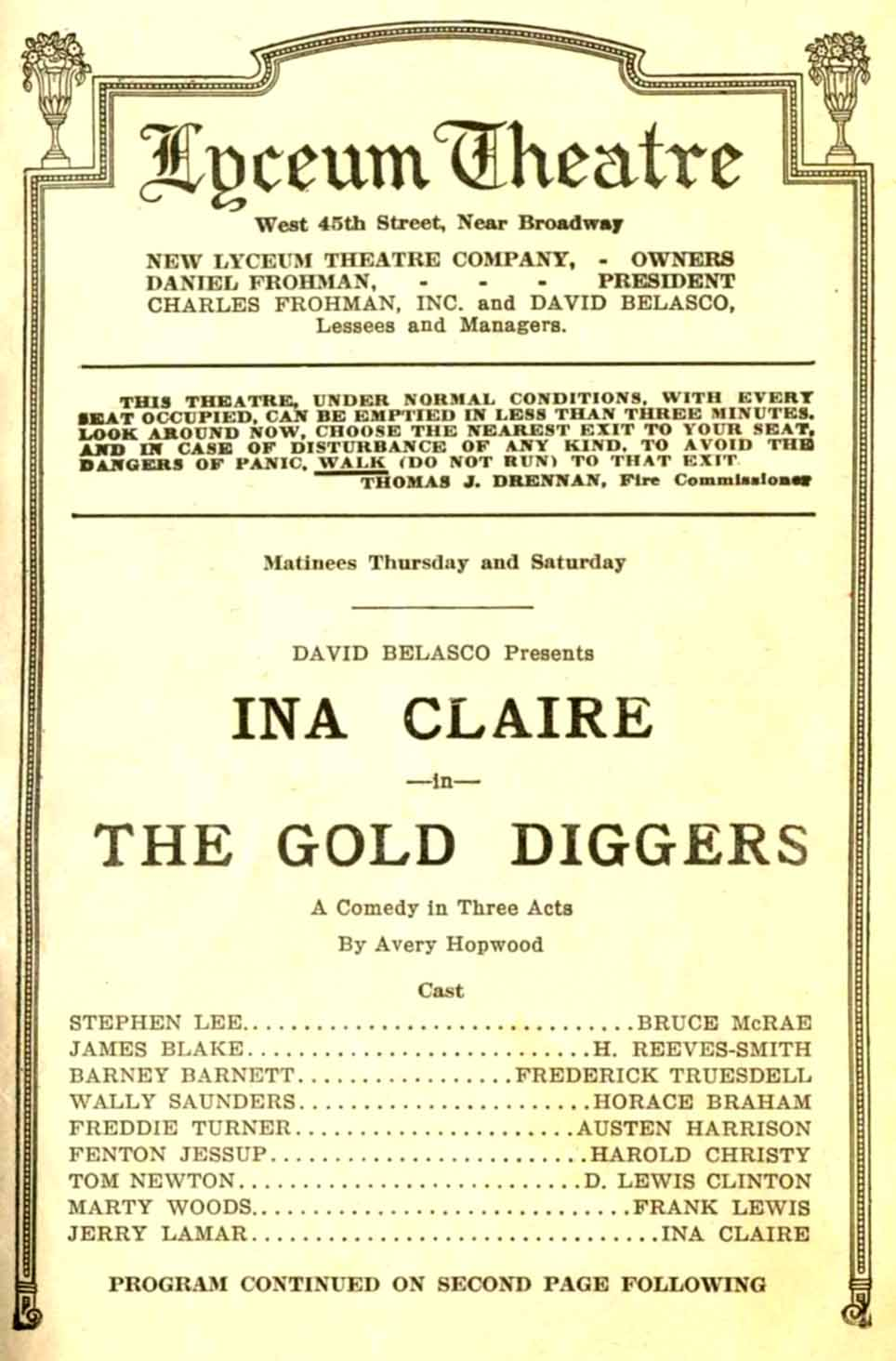
- Broadway program
- Original language: English
- Written by: Avery Hopwood
- Genre: Farce

Premiere
- Date: September 30, 1919
- Place: Lyceum Theatre

The Gold Diggers is a play written by Avery Hopwood. It popularized the use of the term "gold digger" to refer to hypergamous women who seek wealthy partners, as opposed to the earlier usage referring to gold miners. Producer David Belasco staged it on Broadway in 1919, with Ina Claire in the lead role. It was a hit, running for two consecutive seasons before going on tour.

== Plot ==
Stephen Lee is a wealthy man who is convinced that the chorus girl engaged to his nephew is a "gold digger", who only wants his nephew's money. Lee asks Jerry Lamar, another chorus girl he knows, to convince his nephew to break off the engagement. Instead she tries to convince Lee that not all chorus girls are out for money. Unfortunately for her effort, several of her friends demonstrate that they are as money-hungry as Lee fears.

Annoyed by Lee's comments, Lamar decides to show him up by getting him drunk and tricking him into proposing to her. Her scheme proves harmless when it turns out that she and Lee really are in love.

== Productions ==
The play's Broadway opening was at the Lyceum Theatre on September 30, 1919. It ran on Broadway until June 1921, with 720 performances. It then went on tour across the United States until 1923. In this time the play earned over $1.9 million.

The characters and cast from the Broadway production are given below:

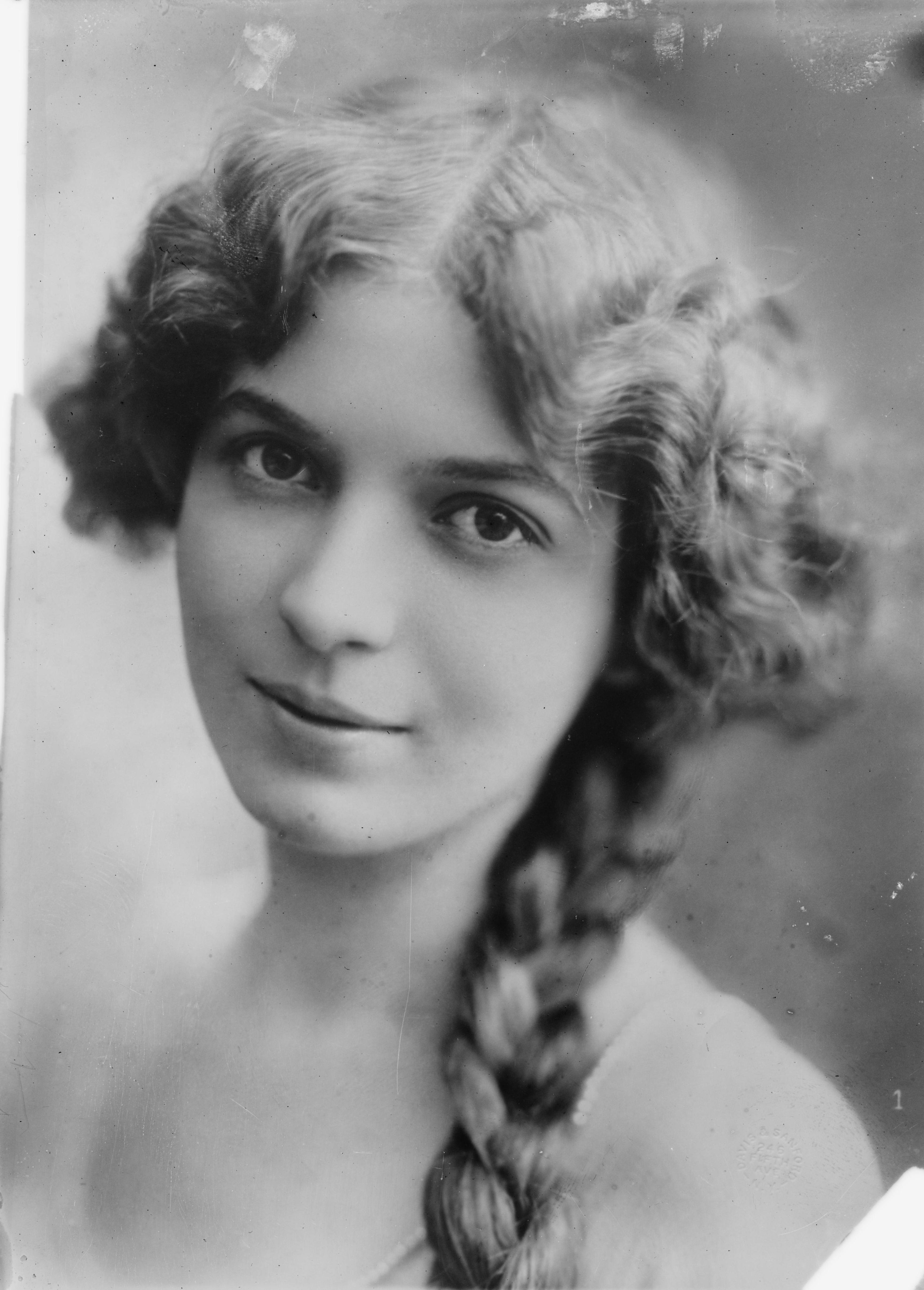
Ina Claire starred as Jerry Lamar in the Broadway production.

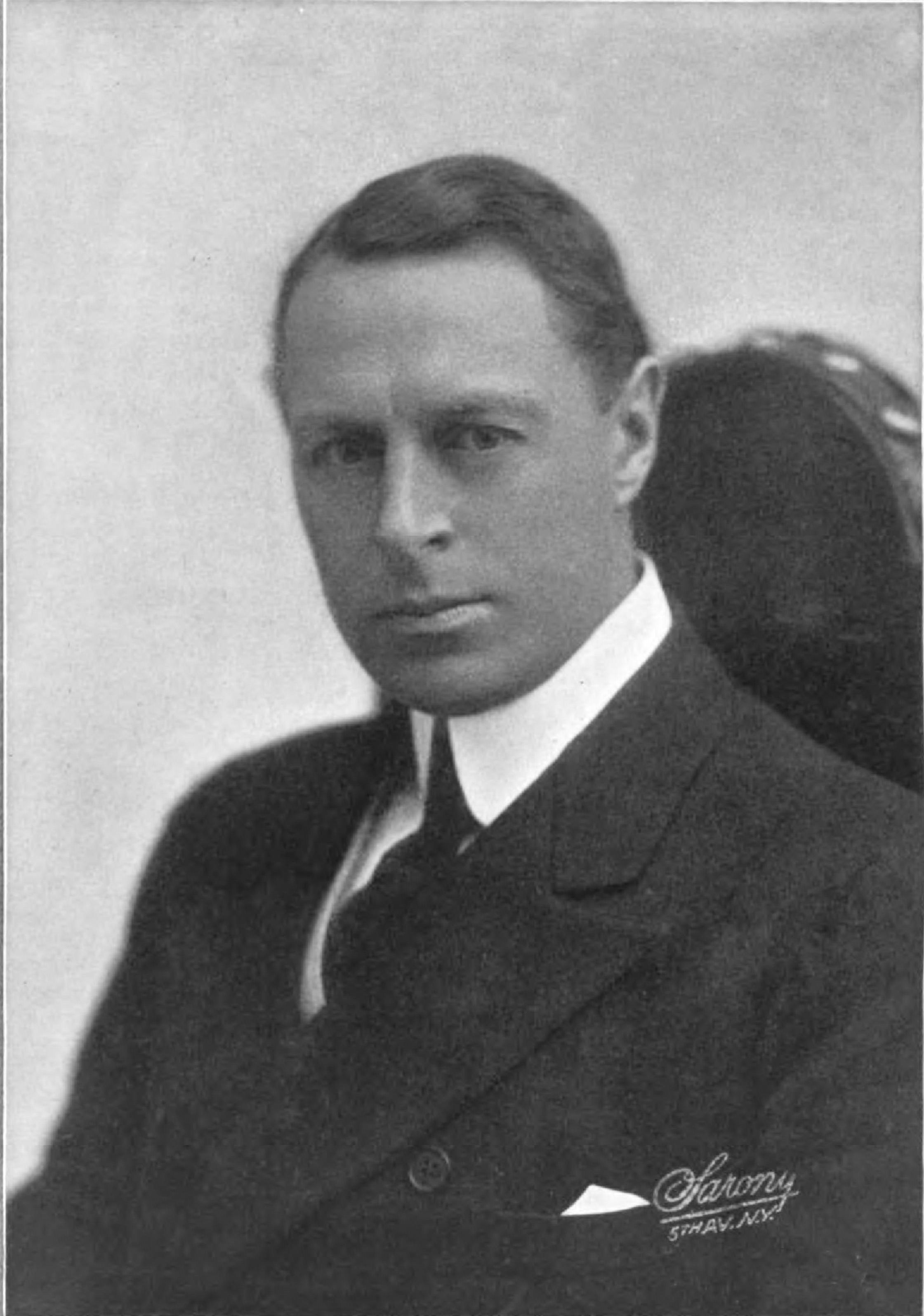
Bruce McRae played Stephen Lee in the Broadway production.

Character	Broadway cast
Jerry Lamar	Ina Claire
Wally Saunders	Horace Braham
Sadie	Louise Burton
Gypsy Montrose	Gladys Feldman
Mrs. Lamar	Louise Galloway
Eleanor Montgomery	Luella Gear
Tom Newton	William Goodridge
Mabel Munroe	Jobyna Howland
Cissie Gray	Loraine Lally
Freddie Turner	Day Manson
Stephen Lee	Bruce McRae
Marty Woods	Arthur Miles
James Blake	H. Reeves-Smith
Fenton Jessup	A.E. Scott
Trixie Andrews	Lilyan Tashman
Topsy St. John	Ruth Terry
Barney Barnett	Frederick Truesdell
Dolly Baxter	Katharine Walsh
Violet Dayne	Beverly West

== Reception and legacy ==
Reviews for the play were mixed. In The New York Times, Alexander Woollcott said it was "screamingly funny at times and rather dull at others". A critic for The Drama called it "vulgar and immoral" and said it gave the wrong impression of chorus girls.

The opinions of reviewers did not stop the play from being a hit. One result of its long run was that after other plays he had written opened in 1920, Hopwood eventually had four shows running on Broadway simultaneously. The play and the string of movies it inspired also helped to popularize the use of the term "gold digger" to refer to acquisitive women, a usage that Hopwood did not invent but which was relatively new at the time. Hopwood's usage of the term was rare enough in 1919 that Belasco's production assistants worried that the play would be mistaken for a story about mining, but within a few years the new usage was widespread.

== Adaptations ==
The play was adapted as a film four times:

- The Gold Diggers (1923)
- Gold Diggers of Broadway (1929)
- Gold Diggers of 1933 (1933)
- Painting the Clouds with Sunshine (1951)

Gold Diggers of 1933 spawned multiple sequels that were not directly based on Hopwood's play: Gold Diggers of 1935, Gold Diggers of 1937, and Gold Diggers in Paris.
