= Kidder =

Kidder may refer to:

== Places ==
In the United States:

- Kidder, Kentucky
- Kidder, Missouri
- Kidder, South Dakota
- Kidder Township, Pennsylvania
- Kidder Mountain, a summit in New Hampshire

== Other uses ==
- Kidder (surname)
- USS Kidder (DD-319), United States Navy destroyer
