= Kidder (surname) =

Kidder is a surname. Notable people with the surname include:

- Alfred V. Kidder (1885–1963), American archaeologist
- Daniel Parish Kidder (1815–1891), American theologian
- Edward Kidder (1665/66–1739), 18th century pastry cook
- Frederic Kidder (1804–85), American author
- Hugh Kidder (1897–1918), officer in the United States Marine Corps during World War I
- Janet Kidder (born 1972), Canadian actress
- Jefferson P. Kidder (1815–1883), 19th century American lawyer, jurist, and politician
- Kathryn Kidder (1868–1930), American actress
- Margot Kidder (1948–2018), Canadian American actress
- Ray Kidder, American physicist and nuclear weapons designer
- Rushworth Kidder (1944–2012), founder of the Institute for Global Ethics
- Sarah Kidder (c.1839–1933), first female railroad president in the world
- Tracy Kidder (1945–2026), American writer of nonfiction books
