= Gold Diggers in Paris =

1938 film

- Directed by: Ray Enright; Busby Berkeley (musical numbers)
- Written by: Earl Baldwin; Warren Duff; Uncredited: Felix Ferry; Sig Herzig; Peter Milne
- Story by: Story idea: Jerry Horwin; James Seymour; Story: Jerry Wald; Richard Macaulay; Maurice Leo
- Produced by: Hal B. Wallis (exec. prod.); Samuel Bischoff (both uncredited)
- Starring: Rudy Vallee; Rosemary Lane; Hugh Herbert; Allen Jenkins
- Cinematography: Sol Polito; George Barnes (musical numbers)
- Edited by: George Amy
- Music by: Uncredited: Ray Heindorf; Heinz Roemheld; Songs: Harry Warren (music); Al Dubin (lyrics); Johnny Mercer (lyrics); Freddie Fisher
- Distributed by: Warner Bros. Pictures
- Release date: June 11, 1938 (U.S.)
- Running time: 97 minutes
- Country: United States
- Language: English

Gold Diggers in Paris is a 1938 Warner Bros. musical film directed by Ray Enright with musical numbers created and directed by Busby Berkeley, starring Rudy Vallee, Rosemary Lane, Hugh Herbert, and Allen Jenkins.

This is the sixth and final installment in Warner Bros.' series of "Gold Digger" films, following The Gold Diggers (1923), a lost silent film; Gold Diggers of Broadway (1929), a remake which is partially lost; Gold Diggers of 1933, a remake of the earlier films and the first to feature Busby Berkeley's extravagant production numbers; Gold Diggers of 1935; and Gold Diggers of 1937.

== Plot ==
Maurice Giraud is sent to New York to arrange for the Academy Ballet of America to come to Paris to compete for cash prizes at an international dance festival, but a cabbie takes him by mistake to the Club Ballé, a nightclub about to go under. The desperate owners of the club, Terry Moore and Duke Dennis, know that an error has occurred, but see the invitation as a way out of their financial problems. To get some ballet into their nightclub act, they hire ballet teacher Luis Leoni and his star (and only) pupil Kay Morrow to teach their girls ballet on the boat crossing the Atlantic. Terry finds Kay very attractive, but things are complicated when his ex-wife, Mona, invites herself along, rooming with Kay.

Meanwhile, the head of the real ballet company, Padrinsky, finds out what has happened and cables Giraud aboard ship, then heads to Paris with his patron, a ballet-loving gangster named Mike Coogan, who intends to rub out Terry and Duke. Giraud is upset about being hoaxed, but is mollified when a "talking dog" (a ventriloquist hired by Terry and Duke) convinces him that Padrinsky is the liar.

After they arrive in Paris, a representative of the exposition, Pierre Le Brec, wants to watch the group's rehearsals, and Duke tells his new friend Coogan, the gangster, that Le Brec is causing him trouble. Coogan goes to "take care" of the problem, but by mistake knocks out Leoni instead of Le Brec. Padrinsky shows up and arranges for the imposters to be deported on the day of the contest, but Mona manages to change the order so that Coogan and Padrinsky are shipped out, instead, which allows the company to perform and win the grand prize.

== Cast ==
- Rudy Vallee as Terry Moore
- Rosemary Lane as Kay Morrow
- Hugh Herbert as Maurice Giraud
- Allen Jenkins as Duke 'Dukie' Dennis
- Gloria Dickson as Mona
- Melville Cooper as Pierre LeBrec
- Mabel Todd as Leticia
- Fritz Feld as Luis Leoni
- Curt Bois as Padrinsky
- Edward Brophy as Mike Coogan
- Eddie 'Rochester' Anderson as Doorman
- The Schnickelfritz Band as themselves

Cast notes:

- Carole Landis, Peggy Moran, and Diana Lewis appear as Gold Diggers.

== Production ==
Majestic Pictures attempted to cash in on the "Gold Diggers" concept by naming a feature Gold Diggers of Paris, but Warner Bros. prevented this through legal action, and the filming and release of Gold Diggers in Paris may have been a part of the effort to protect what Warners considered to be their trademark.

The film was in production at the Warner Bros. studios in Burbank from January to March 1938. It premiered in New York City on June 1, 1938, and went into general release on June 11. The film was known as The Gay Impostors in the U.K.

== Songs and music ==
As usual for a Warner Bros. musical of this period, the extravagant musical numbers were created, designed, staged, choreographed, and directed by Berkeley.

The majority of the songs in Gold Diggers in Paris were written by the team of Harry Warren (music) and Al Dubin (lyrics), who contributed many of the songs in the Gold Diggers series and other Warner Bros. musicals. "I Wanna Go Back to Bali", "Latin Quarter" (a song which was later used frequently in Warner Bros. cartoons featuring Pepé Le Pew), "Let's Drink to a Dream", "Put That Down in Writing", "Stranger in Paree", and "Waltz of the Flowers" were their creations in this film. In addition, Harry Warren wrote two other songs, "My Adventure" and "Daydreaming All Night Long", but with lyrics by Johnny Mercer.

Publicity photo of the Schnickelfritz Band

=== The Schnickelfritz Band ===
The Schnickelfritz Band, ("Schnickelfritz" supposedly being German slang for "silly fellow"), a comedy musical group somewhat reminiscent of Spike Jones (who came later), performs novelty songs in the film. Led by Freddie Fisher, who played woodwinds, sang, and also composed the songs "Colonel Corn" and "Old Hank" for the band, the band consisted of Stanley Fritts (trombone, drums, jug, washboard), Nels Laakso (cornet, trumpet), Paul Cooper (piano), Kenneth Trisko (drums), and Charles Koenig (string bass, tuba). Original trumpeter Nels Laakso left to join The Korn Kobblers and was replaced by trumpet player George Rock, who later became a key member of Spike Jones's City Slickers. The group, which was billed as "America's Most Unsophisticated Band!", recorded for Decca Records, and was brought to Hollywood by Rudy Vallee after his agent saw the group in St. Paul, Minnesota.

According to one source, Gold Diggers in Paris was almost complete at the time the band arrived in Hollywood, so the band's segments were inserted into the film with short intros and reaction shots used to connect them to the rest of the action. The band broke up shortly after doing the film, with Fritts taking some of the members east to become the "Korn Kobblers", and Fisher staying in Hollywood to open a nightclub, where he appeared billed as "The Original Colonel of Corn". Although the Schnickelfritz Band only appeared in two more films years later, Fisher appeared in several others as a band leader.

== Home media ==
On September 16, 2008, Warner Bros. released the picture as a Region 1 DVD as part of a four-film box set titled "The Busby Berkeley Collection, Vol. 2."
