= Gold Diggers of 1935 =

1935 American musical film by Busby Berkeley

- Theatrical release poster
- Directed by: Busby Berkeley
- Screenplay by: Manuel Seff; Peter Milne
- Story by: Robert Lord; Peter Milne
- Produced by: Robert Lord
- Starring: Dick Powell; Adolphe Menjou; Gloria Stuart; Alice Brady
- Cinematography: George Barnes
- Edited by: George Amy
- Music by: Songs: Harry Warren (music); Al Dubin (lyrics)
- Production company: Warner Bros. Pictures
- Distributed by: Warner Bros. Pictures
- Release date: March 16, 1935
- Running time: 95 minutes
- Country: United States
- Language: English
- Budget: $567,000
- Box office: $1,365,000

Gold Diggers of 1935 is an American Warner Bros. musical film directed and choreographed by Busby Berkeley, his directorial debut. It stars Dick Powell, Adolphe Menjou, Gloria Stuart, and Alice Brady, and features Hugh Herbert, Glenda Farrell, Frank McHugh, Joseph Cawthorn, Grant Mitchell, Dorothy Dare, and Winifred Shaw. The songs were written by Harry Warren (music) and Al Dubin (lyrics). The film is best known for its famous "Lullaby of Broadway" production number. That song, sung by Shaw, also won the Academy Award for Best Original Song. The screenplay was by Manuel Seff and Peter Milne, based on a story by Robert Lord, who also produced the film, and Milne.

The movie was the fourth in the Gold Diggers series of films, after the silent film The Gold Diggers (1923), the partially lost "talkie" Gold Diggers of Broadway (1929), and Gold Diggers of 1933 (1933). The first three films, all financially successful, had all been based on the 1919 play The Gold Diggers; Gold Diggers of 1935 was the first one based on a wholly original story. It was followed by Gold Diggers of 1937 and Gold Diggers in Paris.

== Plot ==
In the resort of Lake Waxapahachie in New Hampshire, the swanky Wentworth Plaza is where the rich all congregate, and where the tips flow like wine. Handsome Dick Curtis is working his way through medical school as a desk clerk, and when rich, penny-pinching Mrs. Prentiss offers to pay him to escort her daughter Ann for the summer, Dick can't say no – even his fiancée Arline Davis thinks he should do it. Mrs. Prentiss wants Ann to marry eccentric middle-aged millionaire T. Mosley Thorpe, who is a world-renowned expert on snuffboxes, but Ann has other ideas. Meanwhile, her brother, Humbolt, has a weakness for a pretty face: he has been married and bought out of trouble by his mother several times.

Every summer, Mrs. Prentiss produces a charity show for the "Milk Fund", and this year she hires the flamboyant and conniving Russian dance director Nicolai Nicoleff to direct the show. The parsimonious Mrs. Prentiss wants to spend the least amount possible, but Nicoleff and his set designer Schultz want to be as extravagant as they can, so they can rake off more money for themselves, and for the hotel manager and the hotel stenographer Betty Hawes, who's blackmailing the hapless snuffbox fancier Thorpe.

Of course, Dick and Ann fall in love, Humbolt marries Arline, and the show ends up costing Mrs. Prentiss an arm and a leg, but in the end she realizes that having a doctor in the family will save money in the long run.

== Cast ==
Busby Berkeley's "Lullaby of Broadway" production number from Gold Diggers of 1935

- Dick Powell as Dick Curtis
- Adolphe Menjou as Nicolai Nicoleff
- Gloria Stuart as Ann Prentiss
- Alice Brady as Matilda Prentiss
- Hugh Herbert as T. Mosely Thorpe III
- Glenda Farrell as Betty Hawes
- Frank McHugh as Humbolt Prentiss
- Joseph Cawthorn as August Schultz
- Grant Mitchell as Louis Lampson
- Dorothy Dare as Arline Davis
- Wini Shaw as Winny

== Songs ==
The songs in Gold Diggers of 1935 were written by Harry Warren (music) and Al Dubin (lyrics), and the two production numbers were staged by Busby Berkeley.

- "I'm Going Shopping with You" – Sung by Dick Powell with Gloria Stuart, this is a montage of scenes of Stuart shopping for everything from lingerie to jewelry, much to the dismay of her penny-pinching mother, Alice Brady.
- "The Words Are in My Heart" – First sung by Powell to Stuart while "looking at the stars" on a motorboat on the lake, later in the film it is reprised as an elaborate Busby Berkeley production number utilizing 56 white grand pianos, which were moved around the sound stage by male dancers underneath the piano-shells, dressed in black.
- "Lullaby of Broadway" – One of the famous Busby Berkeley numbers is actually a short film-within-a-film, which tells the story of a Broadway Baby who plays all night and sleeps all day. It opens with a distant head shot of singer Wini Shaw against a black background. The camera slowly pushes in until her head fills the screen, then the camera pulls back and up, and Shaw's head becomes the Big Apple, New York City. As everyone rushes to work, Shaw returns home from her night's carousing and goes to sleep. When she awakens, that night, we follow her and her beau (Dick Powell) from club to club, featuring a partner dance by Ramon and Rosita and elaborate large cast tap numbers, until she is accidentally pushed off a balcony to her death. The sequence ends with a return to Shaw's head as she sings the end of the song. Of all the musical numbers Berkeley created in his career, he named this as his personal favorite.

== Production ==
Gold Diggers of 1935 was filmed at Warner Bros.' Burbank studios, completing on January 14, 1935; it was released on March 16 of that year. During production a chorus dancer, Jack Grieves, died on the set due to acute indigestion.

The film was Busby Berkeley's first time at the helm of a film as the official director, although he had his own unit at Warners to do the elaborate production numbers he conceived, designed, staged and directed, which were the major elements of the Warners musicals of that period.

== Critical response ==
In 1935, Mae Tinee of the Chicago Daily Tribune wrote "As revues go, the present "Gold Diggers" has considerable to offer. There is some bright patter and a number of really amusing situations". In The New York Times the same year, Andre Sennwald wrote "The photoplay, in its preparations for the climactic Berkeley effects, is a brash and lively entertainment which allows Adolphe Menjou and Hugh Herbert to be reasonably amusing."

== Box office ==
According to Warner Bros records, the film earned $897,000 in the U.S. and $468,000 in other markets.

== Awards and honors ==
Harry Warren and Al Dubin received an Oscar for Best Original Song for "Lullaby of Broadway", and Busby Berkeley was nominated for the short-lived category Best Dance Direction.

The film is recognized by American Film Institute in these lists:

- 2004: AFI's 100 Years...100 Songs – Lullaby of Broadway Nominated
- 2006: AFI's Greatest Movie Musicals Nominated
