= No, No, Nanette (1930 film) =

1930 film directed by Clarence G. Badger

- Theatrical release poster
- Directed by: Clarence G. Badger
- Written by: Howard Emmett Rogers (adaptation); Beatrice Van (dialogue)
- Based on: No, No, Nanette; (1925 stage musical) by; Otto A. Harbach; Frank Mandel
- Produced by: Ned Marin
- Starring: Alexander Gray; Bernice Claire; Louise Fazenda
- Cinematography: Sol Polito (Technicolor)
- Music by: (see Songs below)
- Production company: First National Pictures
- Distributed by: Warner Bros. Pictures
- Release dates: January 3, 1930 (NYC); February 16, 1930 (US); March 14, 1930 (LDN); June 28, 1930 (AU); August 20, 1930 (UK)
- Running time: 101 minutes
- Country: United States
- Language: English
- Budget: $418,000
- Box office: $1,451,000

No, No, Nanette is a 1930 American pre-Code musical comedy film with Technicolor sequences, that was directed by Clarence G. Badger and released by First National Pictures. It was adapted from the play of the same title by Otto A. Harbach and Frank Mandel. No, No, Nanette was a popular show on Broadway, running for 321 performances, and was produced and directed by Harry Frazee.

Lobby card featuring "King of the Air"

== Plot ==
Jim Smith, a wealthy bible publisher, surrounds himself with attractive young women and helps aspiring actresses and entertainers.

One day, Jim learns that Nanette, the beautiful daughter of an old friend, will visit him. Nanette dreams of Broadway fame. Her sweetheart, composer Tom Trainor, has written a musical revue specifically for her. However, Tom refuses to sell it to established producers because they would replace Nanette with a more experienced star.

Desperate to finance the show themselves, Nanette seeks out Jim Smith, hoping his wealth and affection for her father will persuade him to invest. Jim agrees to back the production and arrange its opening in Atlantic City, but does not tell his wife Sue. Jim already secretly supports Betty in Chicago and Flora in Boston, and he wants Nanette to be his newest protégée in New York. Thus he persuades Sue to allow Nanette to be their guest, although she dislikes fashionable society life and its formal obligations.

Jim entrusts the management of his complicated affairs to his lawyer and friend Bill Early, who also secretly distributes money to Betty and Flora. However, Bill delays paying them, so they telephone and demand support. Unfortunately, Sue, and Bill's glamorous and mistrusting wife, Lucille Early, are present. Lucille, sophisticated and sharp-eyed, suspects the men are hiding romantic escapades, and encourages Sue to hire detectives and watch their husbands.

Jim dubiously announces he must spend several days at his Atlantic City beach bungalow before the revue's premiere. At the same time, Nanette is supposedly leaving to visit her grandmother in Newark. Sue finds the coincidence questionable, but trusts her husband, asking him to take care of Nanette during the journey. In Atlantic City, Jim and Nanette enjoy several carefree days preparing for the show. However, Bill arrives with alarming news: Sue has discovered the existence of Betty and Flora, and is coming to seek revenge.

Meanwhile, Tom overhears chorus girls gossiping that Jim is Nanette's "sweet daddy".

Realizing disaster is approaching, Jim moves Nanette to a hotel. Tom appears, determined to confront Jim and discover the truth about Nanette. Bill manages to smooth things over temporarily.

Then Lucille arrives with another warning: Sue Smith is only moments away. Sue and Lucille discover more about the production's chorus girls, and arrange for them to come to Jim's beach house. They also find tickets Jim dropped for the theater premiere, and decide to use them themselves to investigate their husbands' behavior.

What follows is a whirlwind of misunderstandings, frantic hiding, jealous confrontations, and comic confusion at the Atlantic City bungalow. Jim barely escapes several compromising situations as characters continually arrive at the wrong moments.

That evening, during the revue's opening performance, Jim enters his theater box, and discovers Sue and Lucille already there, having used the misplaced tickets. The wives catch Jim surrounded by Nanette, Betty, and Flora in seemingly incriminating circumstances. Furious, the women chase their husbands backstage, where Jim and Bill hide in the manager's office.

Sue and Lucille discover that Nanette and Tom are the stars of the show. Sue realizes Nanette is devoted to her career and to Tom, and forgives her. Bill explains that Betty and Flora are not romantic companions, but contestants from beauty pageants. Jim had recruited them as potential talent for the production, imitating the talent-scouting methods of famous theatrical producer Florenz Ziegfeld. Jim supports the story by producing the evening's impressive box-office receipts, while Bill's wife softens when she learns of the large legal fee Bill will receive from the venture. Sue apologizes for her suspicions. Tom thanks Jim for helping launch the show. Reconciled and happy, Tom and Nanette go back on stage for the finale, and embrace as the curtain falls, looking forward to both theatrical success and marriage.

== Cast ==
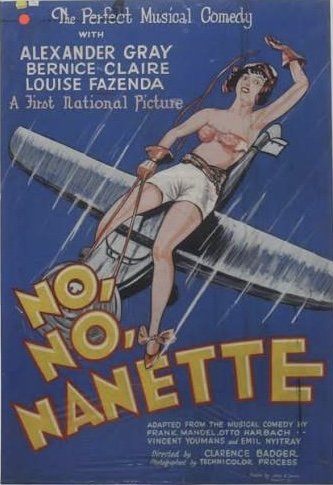
Theatrical release poster style B

- Bernice Claire as Nanette
- Alexander Gray as Tom Trainor
- Lucien Littlefield as Jim Smith
- Louise Fazenda as Sue Smith
- Lilyan Tashman as Lucille Early
- Bert Roach as Bill Early
- ZaSu Pitts as Pauline
- Mildred Harris as Betty
- Henry Stockbridge as Brady
- Jocelyn Lee as Flora

== Songs ==
- "Tea for Two" – words by Irving Caesar, music by Vincent Youmans
- "I Want to Be Happy" – words by Irving Caesar, music by Vincent Youmans
- "King of the Air" – words and music by Al Bryan and Ed Ward
- "As Long As I'm With You" – words and music by Grant Clarke and Harry Akst
- "The Dance of the Wooden Shoes" – words and music by Ned Washington, Herb Magidson and Michael Cleary
- "Dancing on Mars" – words and music by Al Bryan and Ed Ward
- "The Spirit of the Chimes" (also known as the Japanese Ballet) – words and music by Al Bryan and Ed Ward
- "Were You Just Pretending?" – words and music by Herman Ruby and M. K. Jerome

== Production ==
Originally, Nancy Welford, who had recently come from stardom in Gold Diggers of Broadway, and had played the role of Nanette in a 1925 version of the musical on the west coast, was asked to play the role of Nanette, but was ultimately dropped. The replacement for Welford was actress Alice White, but was also dropped because she asked for a very expensive wage and First National Pictures wanted a stage actress.

== Preservation ==
According to the George Eastman Museum 2015 Book "The Dawn of Technicolor, 1915-1935", the BFI National Archive holds a 35mm incomplete nitrate print, 160 ft. The American sound discs are considered lost except for the trailer, overture, and exit music.

== Box office ==
According to Warner Bros records, the film earned $839,000 domestically and $612,000 foreign.

== Critical reception ==
Mordaunt Hall of The New York Times wrote:

No, No, Nannette proves to be quite a merry affair with tunes that are now well known and players whose activities were rewarded with gusts of laughter from the first-night audience at Warners' Strand. It is a show that stirs up mirth from persons who might desire a more sophisticated type of entertainment, for its comedy of wives discovering the more or less harmless deceit of their husbands is invariably unfailing. The Technicolor sequences are not always as well lighted as one would wish, but the staging of these tinted episodes is wrought with no little imagination, especially the glimpses of an airship with turquoise lights and a variety of colors on the fuselage. It is from this stage contrivance that Bernice Claire as Nanette sings one of her songs. Her partner, Tom Trainor, played by Alexander Gray, is also moved to song. The most effective stretches of this diversion, however, are those in black and white.

== See also ==
- List of early color feature films
- List of incomplete or partially lost films
