= The Gold Diggers (1923 film) =

1923 film by Harry Beaumont

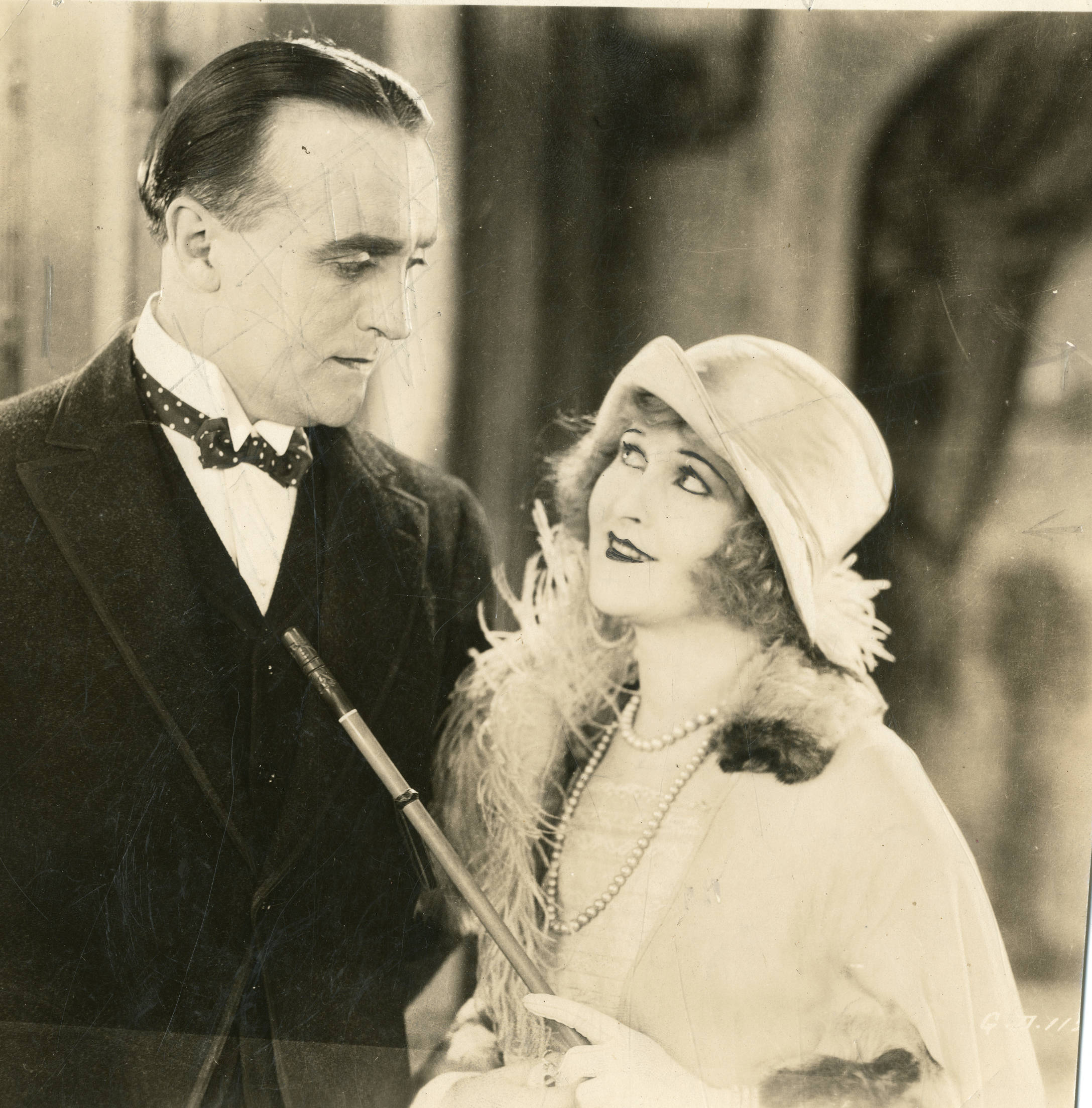
- Still with Wyndham Standing and Hope Hampton
- Directed by: Harry Beaumont
- Written by: Grant Carpenter (scenario)
- Based on: The Gold Diggers; 1919 play by Avery Hopwood
- Produced by: David Belasco
- Starring: Hope Hampton; Wyndham Standing; Louise Fazenda
- Edited by: Frank Mitchell Dazey
- Production company: Warner Bros. Pictures
- Distributed by: Warner Bros. Pictures
- Release date: September 22, 1923 (US)
- Running time: 80 minutes
- Country: United States
- Language: Silent (English intertitles)
- Budget: $280,000
- Box office: $501,000

The Gold Diggers is a Warner Bros. silent comedy film directed by Harry Beaumont with screenplay by Grant Carpenter based on the play The Gold Diggers by Avery Hopwood which ran for 282 performances on Broadway in 1919 and 1920. Both the play and the film were produced by David Belasco. The film stars Hope Hampton, Wyndham Standing, and Louise Fazenda. It was also the (uncredited) film debut of Louise Beavers.

The story of The Gold Diggers was filmed again as a talkie in 1929 as Gold Diggers of Broadway, which is now partially lost, and also in 1933 as Gold Diggers of 1933, with musical numbers created by Busby Berkeley. Three other sequels followed: Gold Diggers of 1935 (1935), Gold Diggers of 1937 (1936), and Gold Diggers in Paris (1938).

== Plot ==
Wally Saunders wants to marry chorus girl Violet Dayne, but his uncle, Stephen Lee thinks that all chorines are gold diggers and refuses to give his approval. Violet's friend Jerry La Mar is not a gold digger, but she agrees to go after Lee so aggressively that Violet will look tame by comparison. Soon Lee and Jerry fall in love and get married, even after he learns the truth about her, and he gives permission for Wally and Violet to get hitched, too.

== Cast ==
- Hope Hampton as Jerry La Mar
- Wyndham Standing as Stephen Lee
- Louise Fazenda as Mabel Munroe
- Gertrude Short as Topsy St. John
- Alec Francis as James Blake
- Jed Prouty as Barney Barnett
- Arita Gillman as Eleanor Montgomery
- Peggy Browne as Trixie Andres
- Margaret Seddon as Mrs. La Mar
- John Harron as Wally Saunders (as Johnny Harron)
- Anne Cornwall as Violet Dayne (as Ann Cornwall)
- Louise Beaudet as Cissie Gray
- Edna Tichenor as Dolly Baxter
- Frances Ross as Gypsy Montrose
- Marie Prade as Sadie

== Box office ==
According to Warner Bros records the film earned $470,000 domestically and $31,000 foreign.

== Preservation ==
With no prints of The Gold Diggers located in any archive it was for decades presumed to be a lost film. In May 2021, a collector found an incomplete nitrate 35mm Belgian print in England, which has been uploaded to YouTube. The surviving footage includes reels 1, 4, 5 and 6, although some of the extant reels have missing sections at the beginning and end of the reels. In June 2021, the same collector uploaded a digitally scanned version of the first five minutes to YouTube, with plans to scan the remaining footage.

== See also ==
- List of incomplete films
