= Lillian Lee =

American actress

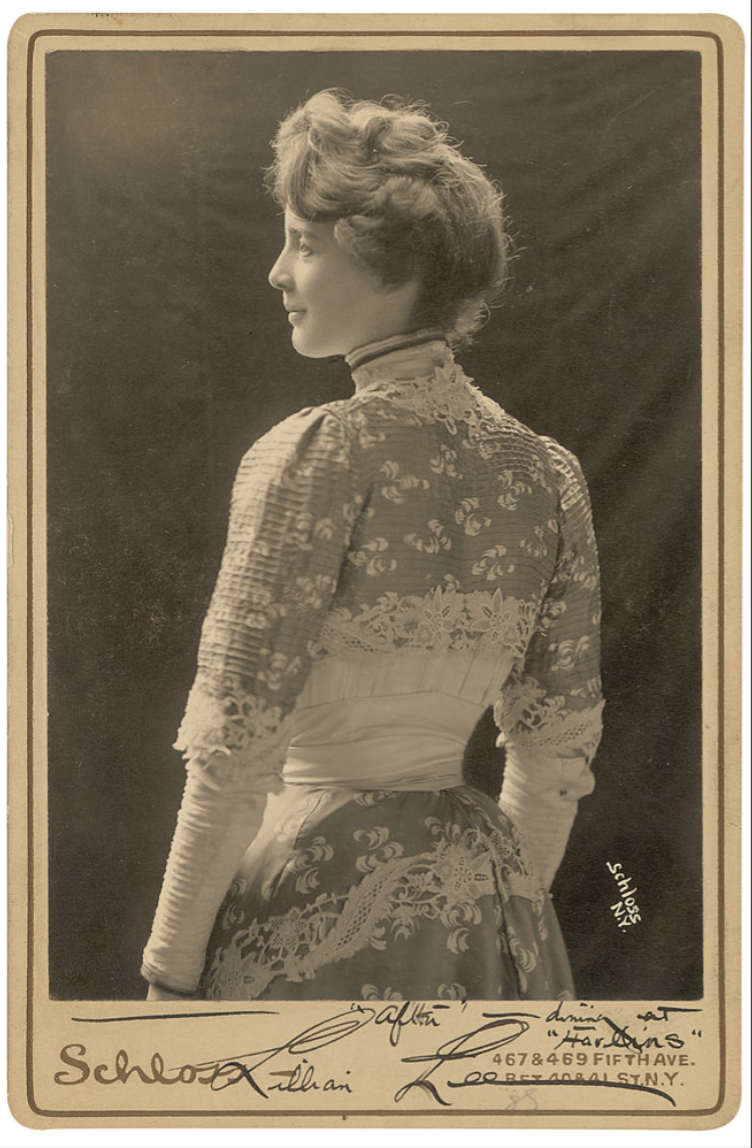
- Lillian Lee, 1907
- Born: c. 1860
- Died: c. 1941
- Occupation: Actress

Lillian Lee was a stage actress in New York City beginning in the early 1880s. She was in the cast of the original Ziegfeld Follies in 1907.

== Acting career ==
Lee was only a child when she was assigned the part of Meenie in Rip Van Winkle, in a company led by Joseph Jefferson. The troupe was then touring in Baltimore, Maryland. She proved a skilled juvenile actress. She grew into a very competent adult theatrical performer. Her first character of importance came when she replaced an ailing Rosa Rand in a play during the 1884 season.

Myra Goodwin played the leading lady in Sis, an 1885 production of the 14th Street (Manhattan) Theatre. The company of Edward Kidder also took seven plays on the road that year. One of them, Niagara, was scheduled to arrive in New York City at the beginning of 1886. Lee was engaged for the production as were Mattie Ferguson, Rose Eytinge, Harry Dalton, and others. The Irish Minstrel by Frederick Marsden was staged at Poole's Theatre, 8th Street near Broadway (Manhattan), in October 1886. W.J. Scanlan played the leading man with Lee being the primary female player.

She was in a cast of actors who presented A Midsummer Night's Dream at Manchester, Massachusetts, in July 1888. The outdoor play was performed evenings with electric light effects.

As Mrs. Jennings in Lover's Lane (1901), she was involved in a production which deals with rural life. The venue was the Manhattan Theatre on 102 West 33rd Street. In 1907 the building was demolished and replaced by a Gimbels department store in 1909.

Mrs. Wiggs of the Cabbage Patch had its New York City debut at the Savoy Theatre, 112 West 34th Street, in the late summer of 1904. The stage of the theatre had been recently expanded to enable the staging of the most detailed productions. The play was an adaptation of both Mrs. Wiggs of the Cabbage Patch and Lovey Mary, written by Anne Crawford Flexner. Lee acted the character of Mrs. Eichorn.

Joe Weber headed a cast of actors who staged Dream City and The Magic Knight at Shubert Park in Brooklyn, in April 1907. Lee was one of the supporting players as were Lillian Blauvelt, Cecilia Loftus, and William Hodge.

The Follies of 1907 were described as a "satirical musical review" when they opened at the Jardin de Paris. The venue was atop the New York Theatre and Criterion Theatre. Entertainment included twenty musical numbers and many vaudeville acts. The chorus was composed primarily of Anna Held singers, who had played the Broadway Theatre only a week earlier. In addition to Lee, Emma Carus and Grace Larue were featured.

She was a part of The Deluge, a play given at Coney Island in the summer of 1908. Dress rehearsals were first held in May 1906, with an audience of 1,000 invited guests. The show began with the building of a model of Noah's Ark, followed by a simulation of the deluge, and finally, a depiction of the millennium.

Lee played Dollbabia in The Lady Of The Slipper, a musical fantasy in three acts, written by Anne Caldwell and Lawrence McCarthy. Presented by the Globe Theatre (Lunt-Fontanne Theatre), in October 1912, a newspaper critic commented about the dull lines given both Lee and Queenie Vassar, the two wicked stepsisters of Cinderella.

Lee appeared as Miss Breckenridge in Cinders at the Dresden Theatre, atop the New Amsterdam Theatre, in April 1923. The musical comedy was written by Edward Clark with music by Rudolf Friml. An intimate theatre had been constructed from a thorough remodeling. Cinders was the first show held on the New Amsterdam Roof after the Midnight Frolics ceased production, when Prohibition in the United States became law in 1920.

=== Silent film role ===
She appeared in the 1923 silent film No Mother to Guide Her in the role of Donald Walling's Sister.
