= Dames (film) =

1934 film by Busby Berkeley, Ray Enright

- Film poster
- Directed by: Ray Enright; Busby Berkeley (musical numbers)
- Screenplay by: Delmer Daves
- Story by: Robert Lord; Delmer Daves
- Produced by: Hal B. Wallis (executive producer)
- Starring: Ruby Keeler; Dick Powell; Joan Blondell; Guy Kibbee; ZaSu Pitts; Hugh Herbert
- Cinematography: George Barnes; Sidney Hickox; Sol Polito
- Edited by: Harold McLernon
- Music by: Harry Warren (music); Al Dubin (lyrics); Heinz Roemheld
- Distributed by: Warner Bros. Pictures
- Release dates: August 16, 1934 (premiere); September 1, 1934 (general)
- Running time: 91 minutes
- Country: United States
- Language: English
- Budget: $779,000
- Box office: $1,513,000

Dames is a 1934 Warner Bros. musical comedy film directed by Ray Enright with dance numbers created by Busby Berkeley. The film stars Ruby Keeler, Dick Powell, Joan Blondell, Guy Kibbee, ZaSu Pitts, and Hugh Herbert. Production numbers and songs include "When You Were a Smile on Your Mother's Lips (and a Twinkle in Your Daddy's Eye)", "The Girl at the Ironing Board", "I Only Have Eyes for You", "Dames" and "Try to See It My Way".

== Plot ==
Eccentric multimillionaire Ezra Ounce, whose main purpose in life is raising American morals through a nationwide campaign, wants to be assured that his fortune will be inherited by upstanding relatives. He visits his cousin Matilda Hemingway in New York City, in Horace's view the center of immorality in America. What Ounce finds most offensive are musical comedy shows and the people who put them on, and it just so happens that Matilda's daughter Barbara is a dancer and singer in love with a struggling singer and songwriter, her 13th cousin, Jimmy Higgens. On Ezra's instructions, Jimmy the "black sheep" has been ostracized by the family, on pain of not receiving their inheritance.

Matilda's husband Horace meets a showgirl named Mabel, who's been stranded in Troy when her show folds, and connives her way into sleeping in Horace's train compartment as a way to get back home. Terrified of scandal, he leaves her some money and his business card, along with a note telling her to not mention their meeting to anyone; but when Mabel discovers that Horace is Barbara's father, she blackmails him into backing Jimmy's show.

== Cast ==
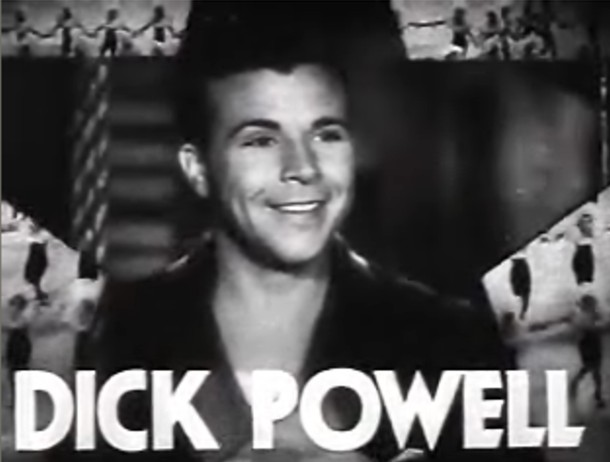
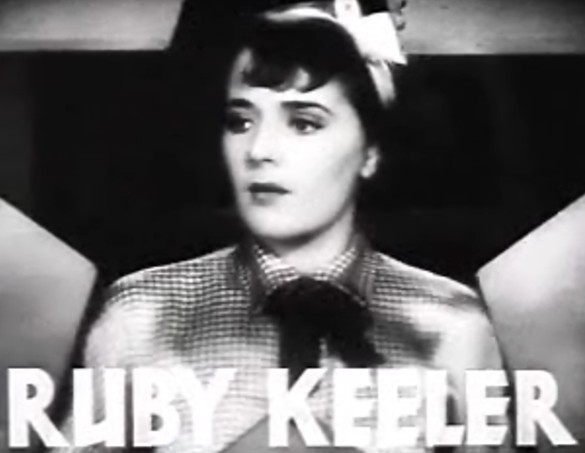
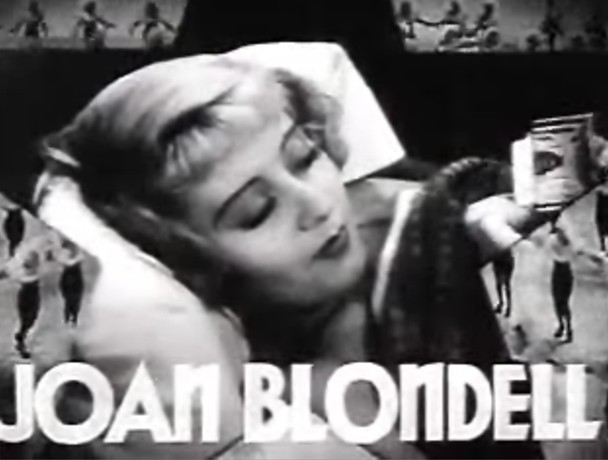
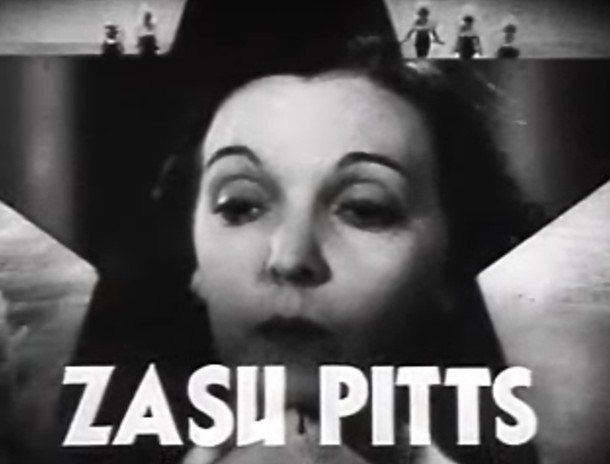
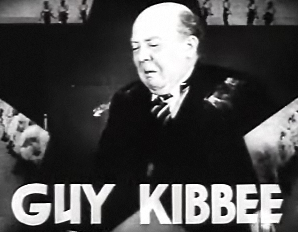
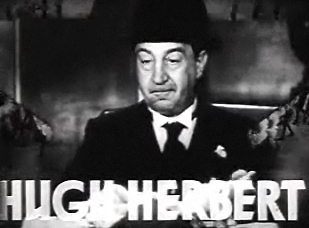
Dick Powell as Jimmy Higgens
Ruby Keeler as Barbara Hemingway
Joan Blondell as Mabel Anderson
ZaSu Pitts as Matilda Ounce Hemingway
Guy Kibbee as Horace Peter Hemingway
Hugh Herbert as Ezra Ounce

=== Supporting cast ===
Arthur Vinton	as Bulger, Ounce's bodyguard
Phil Regan	as Johnny Harris, songwriter
Arthur Aylesworth	as train conductor
Johnny Arthur	as Billings, Ounce's secretary
Leila Bennett	as Laura, the maid
Berton Churchill	as Harold Ellsworthy Todd

=== Cast notes ===
- Songwriter Sammy Fain, who contributed to the music used in the film, has a small role as Buttercup Balmer, a songwriter. This character's name, along with Johnny Harris, came from two men who owned movie theatres in Pennsylvania - this was done at the behest of producer Hal Wallis.
- Veteran bit-part actor Milton Kibbee, brother of Guy Kibbee, has a bit-part as a reporter.
- Jean Rogers, who later played Dale Arden, Flash Gordon's girlfriend, in 1930s serials, is in the chorus.

== Musical numbers ==
The musical sequences in Dames were designed, staged and directed by Busby Berkeley - the Warner Bros. publicity office invented the phrase "cinematerpsichorean" to describe Berkeley's creations. By this time, after the success of 42nd Street, Footlight Parade and Gold Diggers of 1933, Berkeley had his own unit at Warners under his total control as supervised by producer Hal Wallis.

- "Dames" - by Harry Warren (music) and Al Dubin (lyrics)
- "I Only Have Eyes for You" - by Harry Warren (music) and Al Dubin (lyrics). At one point in this number, sung by Dick Powell to Ruby Keeler, all the girls in the chorus wear Ruby Keeler masks as they move around the stage, but in just about every shot, the real Keeler passes by the camera briefly. In 1989, this song won an ASCAP Award as the "Most Performed Feature Film Standard".
- "The Girl at the Ironing Board" - by Harry Warren (music) and Al Dubin (lyrics). Joan Blondell was seven months pregnant at the time this number was filmed, and care had to be taken by her husband, cinematographer George Barnes, not to show her condition. Also, at one point in the number, a property man can be seen in the background, hanging up clotheslines.
- "When You Were a Smile on Your Mother's Lips and a Twinkle in Your Daddy's Eye" by Sammy Fain (music) and Irving Kahal lyrics
- "Try to See It My Way" - by Allie Wrubel (music) and Mort Dixon (lyrics)

One of the effects of the Production Code on this film is a musical number that never made it to the screen. Berkeley had planned one featuring Joan Blondell about a fight between a cat and a mouse that ended with Blondell inviting everyone to "come up and see my pussy sometime". Producer Hal Wallis removed this number from the script before it even got to the censors of the Hays Office.

== Production ==
The director originally slated to do the film was Archie Mayo, and then a second director, before Ray Enright got the job a week before filming began. Some early casting considerations had Ruth Donnelly playing Mathilda instead of ZaSu Pitts, and Hobart Cavanaugh as Ellsworthy Todd. At one point, it was suggested that Eleanor Powell do a specialty number, but she declined to do so.

Dames began production at the Warner Bros. studios in Burbank, California on March 28, 1934. Ray Enright completed the dramatic scenes in mid-April of that year, and Busby Berkeley continued working on the musical numbers until July 3. The film had its premiere on August 16, 1934, and went into general release on September 1 of that year.

== Box office ==
According to Warner Bros., the film earned $1,057,000 in the U.S. and $456,000 in other markets.

== Accolades ==
The film is recognized by American Film Institute in these lists:

- 2006: AFI's Greatest Movie Musicals – Nominated

== See also ==
- Busby Berkeley using alternate takes to circumvent censorship
- Pre-Code Hollywood
