= Robert Lord (screenwriter) =

American screenwriter (1900–1976)

- Born: May 1, 1900; Chicago, Illinois, U.S.
- Died: April 5, 1976 (aged 75); Los Angeles, California, U.S.
- Occupations: Screenwriter, film producer
- Years active: 1927–1951

Robert Lord (May 1, 1900 – April 5, 1976) was an American screenwriter and film producer. He wrote for more than 70 films from 1925 to 1940. He won an Academy Award in 1933 in the category Best Writing, Original Story for the film One Way Passage. He was nominated in the same category in 1938 for the film Black Legion. He was born in Chicago, Illinois and died in Los Angeles from a heart attack.

== Partial filmography ==
- The Lucky Horseshoe (1925) (story)
- The Johnstown Flood (1926, also story)
- The Swell-Head (1927)
- For Ladies Only (1927)
- The Little Snob (1928)
- The Lion and the Mouse (1928)
- Detectives (1928, also story)
- On Trial (1928)
- The Million Dollar Collar (1929, also story)
- Hardboiled Rose (1929)
- No Defense (1929)
- On with the Show! (1929, scenario)
- Gold Diggers of Broadway (1929)
- The Aviator (1929)
- She Couldn't Say No (1930)
- Hold Everything (1930)
- Little Caesar (1931, uncredited)
- Big Business Girl (1931)
- Five Star Final (1931)
- Manhattan Parade (1931)
- So Big (1932)
- Winner Take All (1932)
- One Way Passage (1932, story, also producer)
- The Conquerors (1932)
- Frisco Jenny (1932)
- 20,000 Years in Sing Sing (1932) (also producer)
- Heroes for Sale (1933)
- The World Changes (1933, producer)
- Gold Diggers of 1933 (1933, producer)
- Mary Stevens, M.D. (1933)
- Footlight Parade (1933, uncredited story, also producer)
- Convention City (1933)
- The Little Giant (1933)
- Jimmy the Gent (1934, producer)
- Dames (1934, story)
- Gold Diggers of 1935 (1935, story)
- Page Miss Glory (1935)
- Dr. Socrates (1935)
- Stage Struck (1936)
- Colleen (1936, story)
- Black Legion (1937, story, also producer)
- Confessions of a Nazi Spy (1939, producer)
- The Private Lives of Elizabeth and Essex (1939, producer)
- 'Til We Meet Again (1940, story)
- Footsteps in the Dark (1941, producer)
- High Wall (1947, producer)
- Tokyo Joe (1949, producer)
- Sirocco (1951, producer)
