= The Jazz Cinderella =

1930 film

- Myrna Loy (second from right) and other cast members in a scene from the film
- Directed by: Scott Pembroke
- Written by: Arthur Howell; Edwin Johns; Adrian Johnson; Oliver Jones; Scott Pembroke
- Produced by: George R. Batcheller
- Starring: Myrna Loy; Jason Robards Sr. Nancy Welford
- Cinematography: M.A. Anderson
- Edited by: W. Donn Hayes
- Production company: Chesterfield Pictures
- Distributed by: Chesterfield Pictures
- Release date: September 1, 1930
- Running time: 66 minutes
- Country: United States
- Language: English

The Jazz Cinderella is a 1930 American romantic drama film directed by Scott Pembroke and starring Myrna Loy, Jason Robards Sr. and Nancy Welford. In Britain it was released under the alternative title of Love Is Like That.

== Cast ==
- Myrna Loy as Mildred Vane
- Jason Robards Sr. as Herbert Carter
- Nancy Welford as Patricia Murray
- Dorothy Phillips as Mrs. Consuelo Carter
- David Durand as Danny Murray
- Freddie Burke Frederick as Junior Carter
- Frank McGlynn Sr. as Henry Murray
- James P. Burtis as Ollie
- George Cowl as Darrow
- Murray Smith as Epstein
- William H. Strauss as Fineman
- Roland Ray as Pierre
- June Gittelson as Sylvia de Sprout

== Bibliography ==
- Leider, Emily W. Myrna Loy: The Only Good Girl in Hollywood. University of California Press, 2011.
