= Cinders (musical) =

Musical by Rudolf Friml and Edward Clark

Cinders is a musical in two acts with music by Rudolf Friml and both book and lyrics by Edward Clark. It re-sets the Cinderella fairy tale in 1920s era New York City. It premiered at the Garrick Theatre in Philadelphia on March 12, 1923, and later that month toured to the National Theatre in Washington, D.C. It moved to Broadway where it opened at the Dresden Theatre on April 3, 1923. It ran for 31 performances, and closed on April 28, 1923.

Cinders starred Nancy Welford in the title role. It was both produced and staged by Edward Royce. Others in the cast included W. Douglas Stevenson as John Winthrop, Margaret Dale as Mrs. Horatio Winthrop, Queenie Smith as Tillie Olsen, George Bancroft as Great Scott, Fred Hillebrand as Slim Kelly, John H. Brewer as Major Drummond, Lillian Lee as Miss Breckenridge, Kitty Kelly as Tottie, Estelle Levelle as Lottie, Eden Gray as Ninette, Roberta Beatty as Mrs. Delancey Hoyt, Edith Campbell-Walker as Mme. Duval, Mary Lucas as Geraldine, and Thomas Fitzpatrick as the Butler.
