= Kidder, Kentucky =

Unincorporated community in Kentucky, United States

Kidder
- Unincorporated community
- Location within the state of Kentucky Kidder (the United States)
- Coordinates: 36°54′54″N 84°39′6″W
- Country: United States
- State: Kentucky
- County: Wayne
- Elevation: 787 ft (240 m)
- Time zone: UTC-5 (Eastern (EST))
  - Summer (DST): UTC-4 (EST)
- GNIS feature ID: 508387

Kidder is an unincorporated community in Wayne County, Kentucky, United States. Its post office is closed.
