= Frederic Kidder =

American historian

Frederic Kidder (April 16, 1804 – December 19, 1885) was an American writer and antiquarian. He was born in New Ipswich, New Hampshire, was mainly self-educated, and engaged in various business ventures in Boston and New York. He made special researches into the history of early New England times and families. He wrote:

- The History of New Ipswich, a New Hampshire Town (1852)
- The Expeditions of Captain John Lovewell (1865)
- Military Operations in Eastern Maine and Nova Scotia during the Revolution (1867)
- History of the First New Hampshire Regiment in the War of the Revolution (1868)
- History of the Boston Massacre (1870)

== Sources ==
- The New England Historical and Genealogical Register, Volume 42, 1888
