= Edward Kidder =

Edward Kidder (1665/66–1739) was an 18th-century British pastry chef. He worked in Queen Street, Cheapside in London and opened two cooking schools.

Kidder is remembered for his cookbook Receipts of Pastry and Cookery For the Use of his Scholars, based upon classes taught at his London cooking school. The book was printed using engraved copper plates. The frontispiece showed a portrait of Kidder in a full wig and period attire.
