= Nancy Welford =

British-American actress (1904–1991)

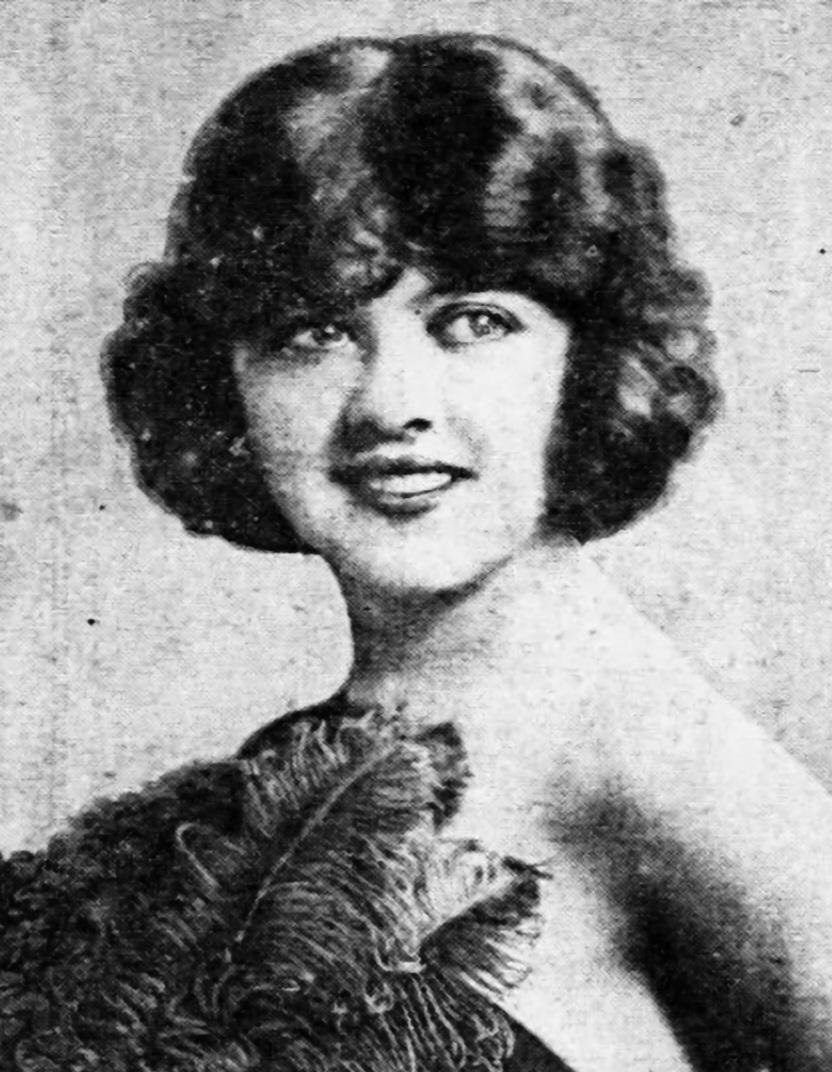
- Welford in 1923
- Born: May 31, 1904; London, England
- Died: September 30, 1991 (aged 87); San Francisco, California, U.S.
- Occupation: Actress
- Years active: 1929–1933
- Spouse(s): F. Heath Cobb (m. 1924; div. 19?) Henry C. Morris (m. 1945)
- Children: 5

Nancy Welford (May 31, 1904 – September 30, 1991), also known as Christine Welford, was a British-born American actress in the early sound film era.

== Early life ==
The daughter of actress Ada Loftus and actor Dallas Welford, she was born in London, England and came to the United States when she was six years old.

== Career ==
Welford's stage debut came as a member of the ensemble for Mimic World. As early as 1921, she was active in vaudeville. In 1922, she appeared at the Fulton Theatre on Broadway in the musical Orange Blossoms by Victor Herbert. In 1923 she starred in the title role of the Broadway musical Cinders which used a score by Rudolf Friml. That same year, a caption of a photograph in the New York Daily News described her as the prima donna of a musical comedy and noted, "She has come up from the chorus and come to stay." She next joined the Gallagher and Shean duo in their performances. In 1926, Welford starred in Nancy, a musical for which she was the inspiration. This was followed by the role of Mary Wheeler in the hit 1928 musical Rain or Shine.

She acted in five films between 1929 and 1933. She is probably today mostly known for starring in the 1929 Warner Brothers musical Gold Diggers of Broadway.

== Personal life ==
On October 24, 1924, Welford married film director F. Heath Cobb in Cleveland, Ohio. Her parents learned of the marriage about a month later, prompting her father to say, "I don't believe it", and putting her mother under a doctor's care at her home. She married, secondly, to Henry C. Morris, in 1945.

== Death ==
Welford died in San Francisco, California on September 30, 1991, aged 87.

== Filmography ==
Year	Title	Role	Notes
1929	Gold Diggers of Broadway	Jerry Lamar	Incomplete film, final two reels survive and Vitaphone soundtrack
1929	The Phantom of the House	Dorothy Milburn	
1930	The Jazz Cinderella	Patricia Murray	
1931	A Safe Affair	Mary Bolton	
1933	Yours Sincerely	Betty Braley	
