= Gold Diggers of Broadway =

Partially lost 1929 pre-Code American musical comedy film

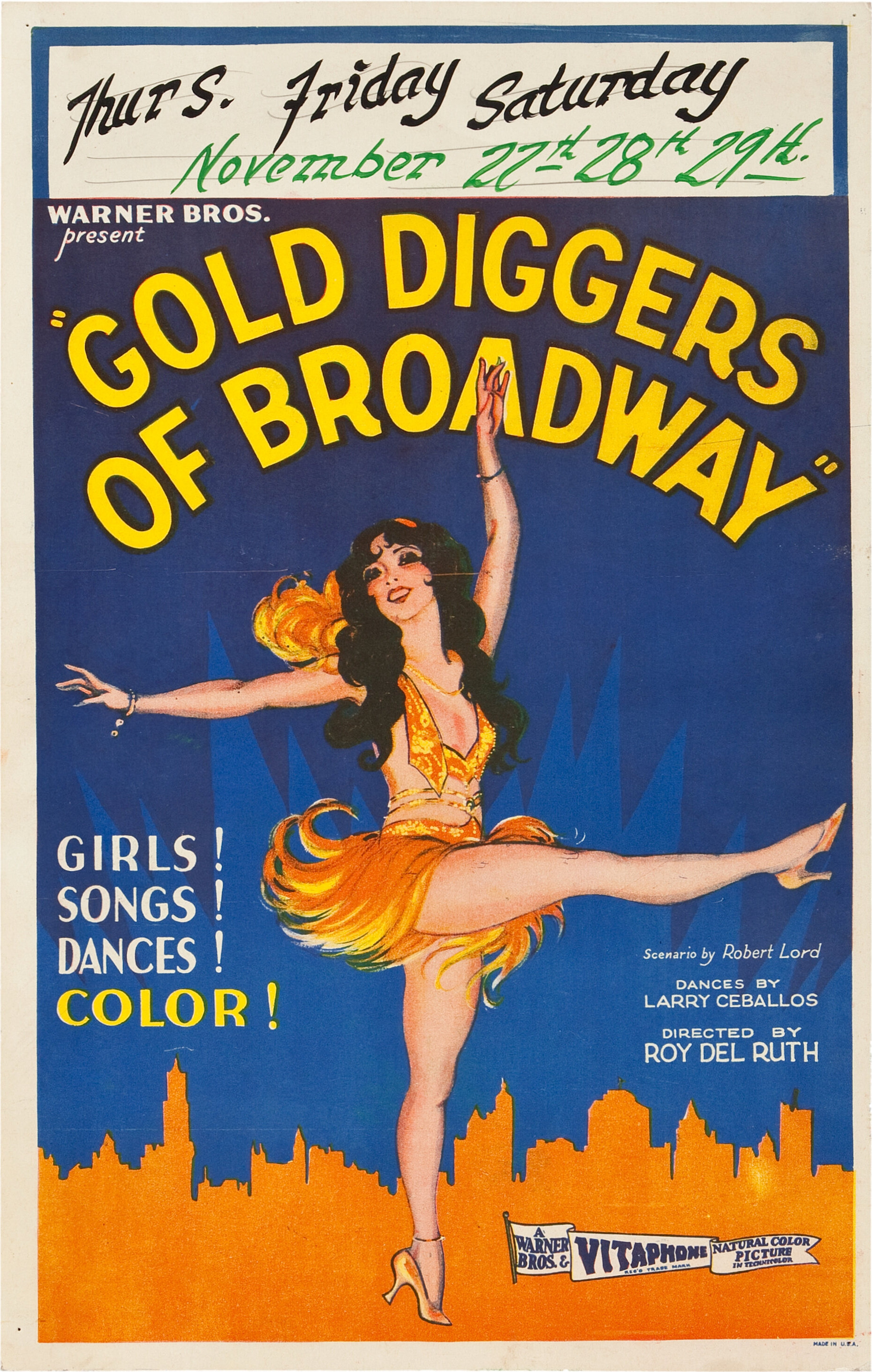
- Theatrical release poster
- Directed by: Roy Del Ruth
- Written by: Robert Lord (scenario & dialogue); De Leon Anthony (titles)
- Based on: The Gold Diggers; 1919 play by Avery Hopwood
- Starring: Winnie Lightner; Nick Lucas; Nancy Welford
- Cinematography: Barney McGill; Ray Rennahan (Technicolor)
- Edited by: William Holmes
- Music by: Joseph Burke (music); Al Dubin (lyrics)
- Color process: Technicolor Process 3
- Production company: Warner Bros. Pictures
- Distributed by: Warner Bros. Pictures
- Release dates: August 30, 1929 (NYC); October 5, 1929 (US); November 23, 1929 (Silent); March 15, 1930 (AU); April 25, 1930 (IRE)
- Running time: 105 minutes
- Country: United States
- Language: English
- Budget: $532,000
- Box office: $3,967,000 (worldwide rental)

Gold Diggers of Broadway (also known as The Gold Diggers of Broadway) is a 1929 American sound (All-Talking) pre-Code musical comedy film directed by Roy Del Ruth and starring Winnie Lightner and Nick Lucas. Distributed by Warner Bros. Pictures, the film is the second all-talking, all-Technicolor feature-length film (after On with the Show!, also released that year by Warner Bros.).

Gold Diggers of Broadway became a box office sensation, making Winnie Lightner a worldwide star and boosting guitarist crooner Nick Lucas to further fame as he sang two songs that became 20th-century standards: "Tip-Toe Thru' the Tulips with Me" and "Painting the Clouds with Sunshine".

Based on the 1919 play The Gold Diggers—which was also turned into a silent film of the same name in 1923—Gold Diggers of Broadway used showgirls, Technicolor, and sound as its main selling points.

It was released in New York City on August 29, 1929, and was played at the Winter Garden Theatre.

It was chosen as one of the ten best films of 1929 by The Film Daily. As with many early Technicolor films, no complete print survives, although the last twenty minutes do, but missing are a bridging sequence and the last minute of the film. Contemporary reviews, the soundtrack and the surviving footage suggest that the film was a fast-moving comedy which was enhanced by Technicolor and a set of lively and popular songs. It encapsulates the spirit of the flapper era, giving a glimpse of a world about to be changed by the Great Depression.

Because Gold Diggers of Broadway has been considered a partially lost film since the 1970s, the loose remake, Gold Diggers of 1933, is the most frequently seen version of the story.

== Plot ==
An audience watches a lavish Broadway revue featuring the "Song of the Gold Diggers" in an art deco gold mine with women in Ziegfeld-style costumes. Guitarist Nick Lucas next sings "Painting the Clouds with Sunshine". The chorus girls of the revue are "man hungry", except for Violet Dayne and her roommate, Jerry Lamar, who has a boyfriend, Barney Barnett.

The day after a party at Barney's, Mabel Munroe is hung over at the apartment she shares with Jerry and Violet. Their friends Eleanor Montgomery and Topsy St. Clair visit and are introduced to Cissy Grey, an aging star who now sells soap door-to-door. Mabel is set against marriage ("And Still They Fall in Love"). Jerry learns that Violet’s fiancée, Wally Saunders, does not have his uncle, Stephen Lee’s permission to marry Violet. Jerry decides she will convince Stephen to let them marry. Steve goes to Jerry’s and accuses her of trying to marry Wally, despite her attempts to prove her point. Jerry, fed up, says that she is going to marry Wally. Steve brings over his lawyer, James Blake, who advises him to befriend Jerry before making any further decisions. Mabel takes a fancy to Blake ("Mechanical Man").

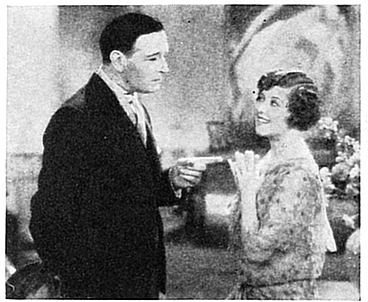
Image from Photoplay magazine

Gold Diggers of Broadway
Partial surviving audio from 10 discs, minus the recently rediscovered reel 2.

That evening, at a party where Nick sings "Painting the Clouds with Sunshine", Jerry plans to behave badly so Violet will look good in contrast. Mabel sings ("Keeping the Wolf from the Door") before falling into Blake’s lap. Nick then sings "Tip-Toe Thru' the Tulips with Me". Ann Collins, a star whom Jerry understudies, dances ("The Pennington Glide"). The party moves to Jerry's apartment, where Ann woos Nick ("In a Kitchenette"). Mabel persuades Blake to go window shopping for a car. Nick sings "Go to Bed" as the party winds up. Jerry gets Steve drunk and tries to persuade him to allow Wally to marry Violet by fabricating her own wanton background. Steve says he will allow Violet and Wally to get married and confesses his love for Jerry. Jerry's mother comes out of the bedroom, finds them together, and debunks Jerry's lies, prompting Steve into leaving angrily.

The next morning at rehearsal, Jerry feels disgraced. Mabel is given an extra line, "I am the spirit of the ages, and the progress of civilization", but struggles to memorize it. She accepts a marriage proposal from Blake and promises to stop being a gold digger. Nick is reprimanded for singing badly ("What Will I Do Without You"). Ann fights with a showgirl who mocks Ann for her behavior at the party, and Ann gets a black eye. She cannot disguise it with makeup, so Jerry plays her starring role that evening. The performance starts with Nick singing "Tip-Toe Thru' the Tulips with Me". In Jerry’s dressing room, Steve tells her that he consented to Wally and Violet's marriage. He asks Jerry to marry him, and she happily accepts.

On stage, Jerry leads the "Song of the Gold Diggers" with different lyrics against a huge art deco backdrop of Paris at night. In a lavish production number, several songs are reprised, and male choristers lift Mabel into the air. Mabel strikes a pose resembling the Statue of Liberty and begins but forgets her line, despite having practiced it.

== Cast ==
- Nancy Welford as Jerry Lamar, an understudy of Ann Collins who is not "man hungry" like other chorus girls
- Conway Tearle as Steve Lee, Wally's uncle
- Winnie Lightner as Mabel Munroe, a "gold-digging" chorus girl with a stance against marriage
- Ann Pennington as Ann Collins, a Broadway star
- Gertrude Short as Topsy St. Clair, a "man hungry" chorus girl
- Lilyan Tashman as Eleanor Montgomery, a British chorus girl and close friend of Topsy
- Helen Foster as Violet Dayne, a chorus girl who loves Wally
- William Bakewell as Wally Saunders, who loves Violet
- Nick Lucas as Nick, a guitarist and a singer
- Albert Gran as James Blake, a wealthy lawyer
- Julia Swayne Gordon as Cissy Gray, an aging star reduced to advertising a soap product
- Lee Moran as dance director
- Armand Kaliz as Barney Barnett, Jerry's initial boyfriend
- Judith Wood as Helen Johnson, a showgirl who taunts Ann into a fight
- Margaret Seddon as Mrs. Lamar, Jerry’s mother

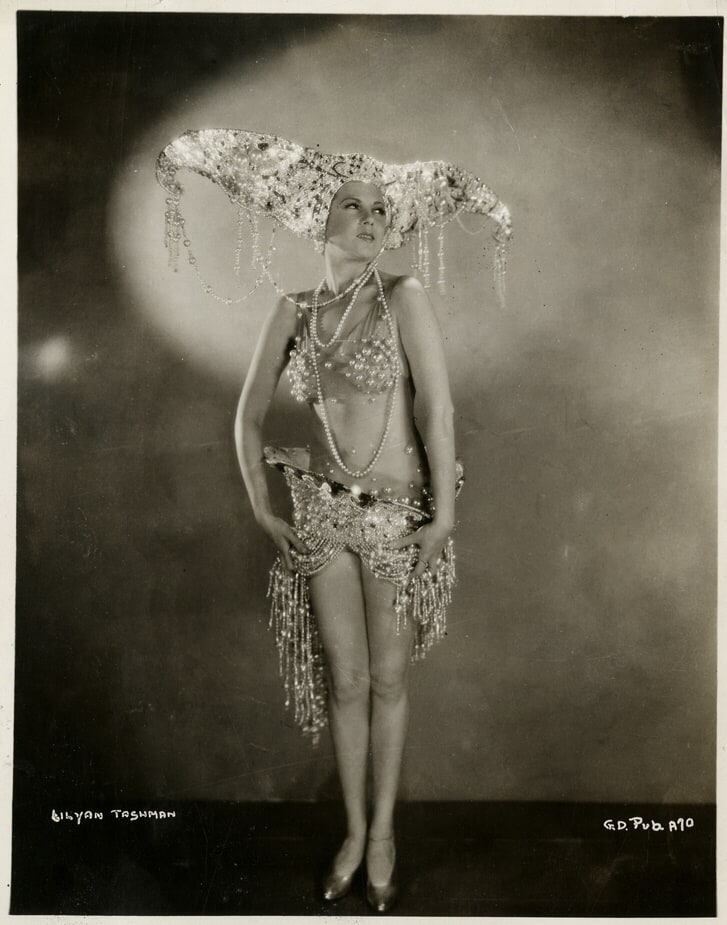
Lilyan Tashman in pearl-drop costume for "Song of the Gold Diggers"

Notes:

- The film's director, Roy Del Ruth, began a relationship with Winnie Lightner in 1929, but they did not marry until 1948.
- The only actors in the 1929 film who also appeared in the 1923 silent version were Gertrude Short and Louise Beavers.
- The only actress who was in the 1919 play was Lilyan Tashman, who played Trixie Andrews.

== Production ==
The song "Painting the Clouds with Sunshine" was originally the main theme for the film. After Nick Lucas signed on, the film was spotted as a potential hit, and "Tiptoe Through the Tulips" was written to enlarge the film; Darryl Zanuck, who hired Lucas, provided an extra production number for the tune. A greatly different version was later performed by the camp singer Tiny Tim, who recorded it as a novelty, accompanying himself on ukulele. The notoriety of this version attached a stigma to the tune that would remain. However, Lucas was a favorite of Tiny Tim's and was a guest at Tim's wedding ceremony on The Tonight Show in 1969, when the two sang the song together.

The production numbers "Painting the Clouds with Sunshine" and "Tiptoe Through the Tulips" both start on a smaller set and move to a larger one. To change between sets while the song was sung and create a seamless transition, instead of using a curtain, a shot of a stagehand was shown throwing a sparking electric lighting switch which darkens one scene out and fades in another. The basic storyline was modified and reused in later Warner Bros. films such as Gold Diggers of 1933 (1933) and Painting the Clouds with Sunshine (1951).

The theater set used in Gold Diggers of Broadway was also used in other Warner Bros. and First National movies, such as Paris, On with the Show!, Is Everybody Happy?, Sally, Footlights and Fools, and No, No, Nanette, as well as other set pieces and costumes that were used as late as 1930.

Efrus & Bennett published a photoplay novel of Gold Diggers of Broadway, based on Hopwood's early screenplay, novelized by Eve Bernstein.

=== Technicolor ===
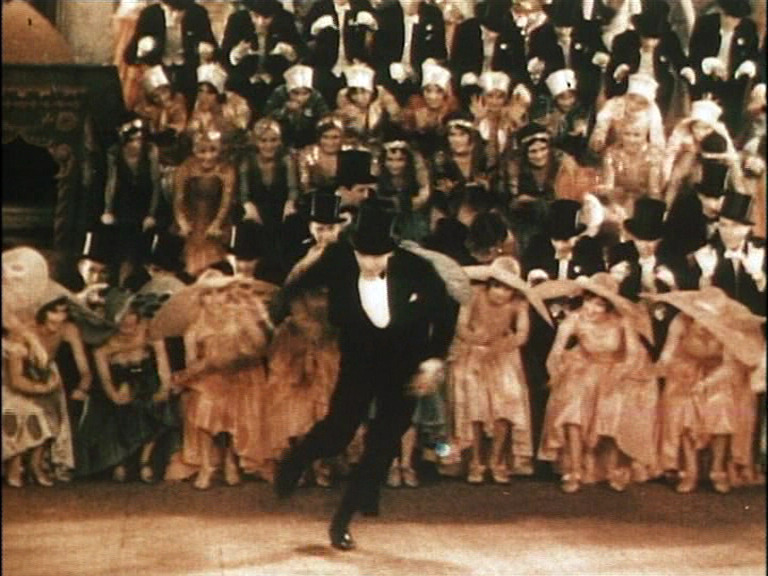
Finale; note the early use of color in the film

Gold Diggers of Broadway was filmed in Technicolor. According to Herbert Kalmus, the co-founder and President of the company, the system Technicolor used at that time was a subtractive imbibition two-color process introduced in 1928 that utilized filters and a normal-thickness dye-transfer print, as opposed to two prints cemented together, as had previously been the case. Warner Bros. was one of the primary users of the new system, although other studios utilized it as well, often for color sequences within an otherwise black-and-white film. Warner Bros., however, often made films that were color throughout: In 1930, they released 15 films that used two-color Technicolor, only four of which used color only for limited sequences.

== Songs ==
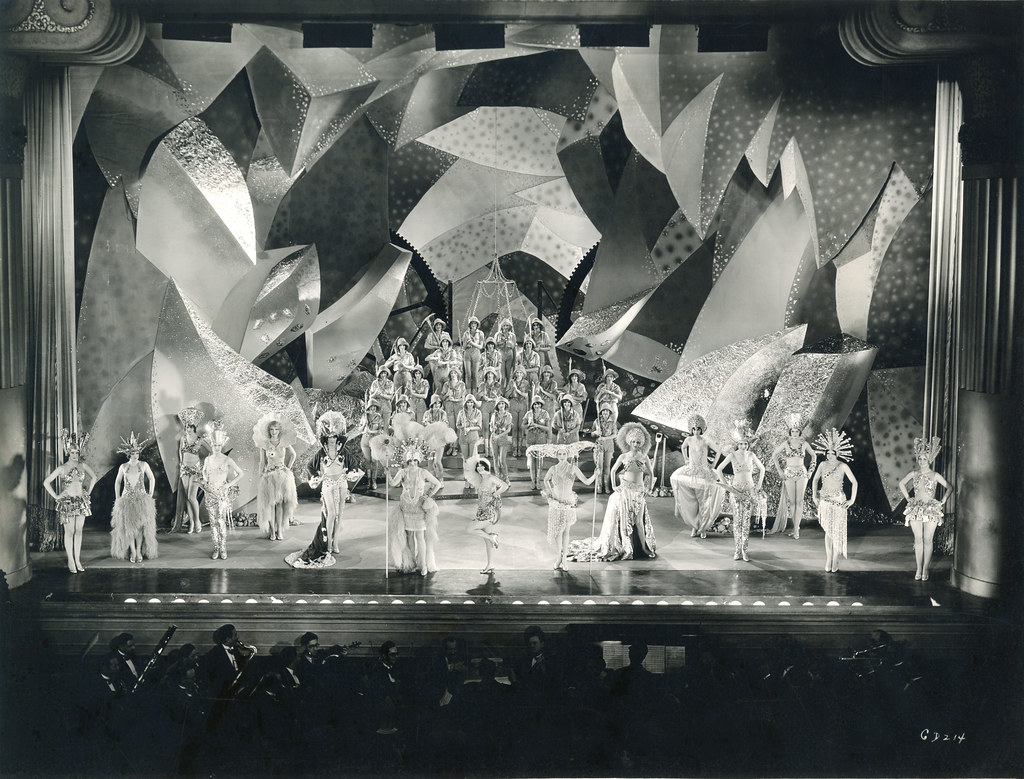
Still of "Song of the Gold Diggers"

The songs are by Al Dubin and Joe Burke except as otherwise specified.

- "Song of the Gold Diggers" – Chorus
- "Painting the Clouds with Sunshine" – Nick Lucas and Chorus
- "And Still they Fall in Love" – Winnie Lightner
- "Blushing Bride" – Nancy Welford on piano
- "Mechanical Man" – Winnie
- "Painting the Clouds with Sunshine" (reprise) – Nick on guitar
- "Keeping the Wolf from the Door" – Winnie
- "Tip-Toe Thru' the Tulips with Me" – Nick on guitar. The song was nominated for the American Film Institute's 2004 list AFI's 100 Years...100 Songs.
- "The Pennington Glide"– Instrumental
- "In a Kitchenette" –Nick Lucas on guitar
- "Go to Bed" –Nick Lucas on guitar
- "What Will I Do Without You?" –Nick (with Harry Akst on piano – uncredited)
- "Tip-Toe Thru' the Tulips with Me" (reprise) – Nick on guitar with Chorus
- Finale: medley – Nancy with Chorus (featuring "Song of the Gold Diggers"/"Tip-Toe Thru' the Tulips with Me" (instrumental) /"Go to Bed"(instrumental )/"Painting the Clouds with Sunshine"/"Mechanical Man"(instrumental)/"Song of the Gold Diggers")

Still of "The Poison Kiss of that Spaniard"

Another song was composed for the film, "The Poison Kiss of that Spaniard", also by Dubin and Burke, but was initially cut before release. It is thought to have been cut sometime after filming, for there is a still that matches up with the scene description of the song from various accounts. The song appears in the novelization, which was based on a very early version of the screenplay. However, the song was released on sheet music as a professional copy. The song was used in Winnie Lightner's next film, She Couldn’t Say No.

== Commercial performance ==
According to Warner Bros records, the film earned $2,540,000 domestically and $1,427,000 foreign. It was the studio's most popular film of the year.

== Critical reception ==
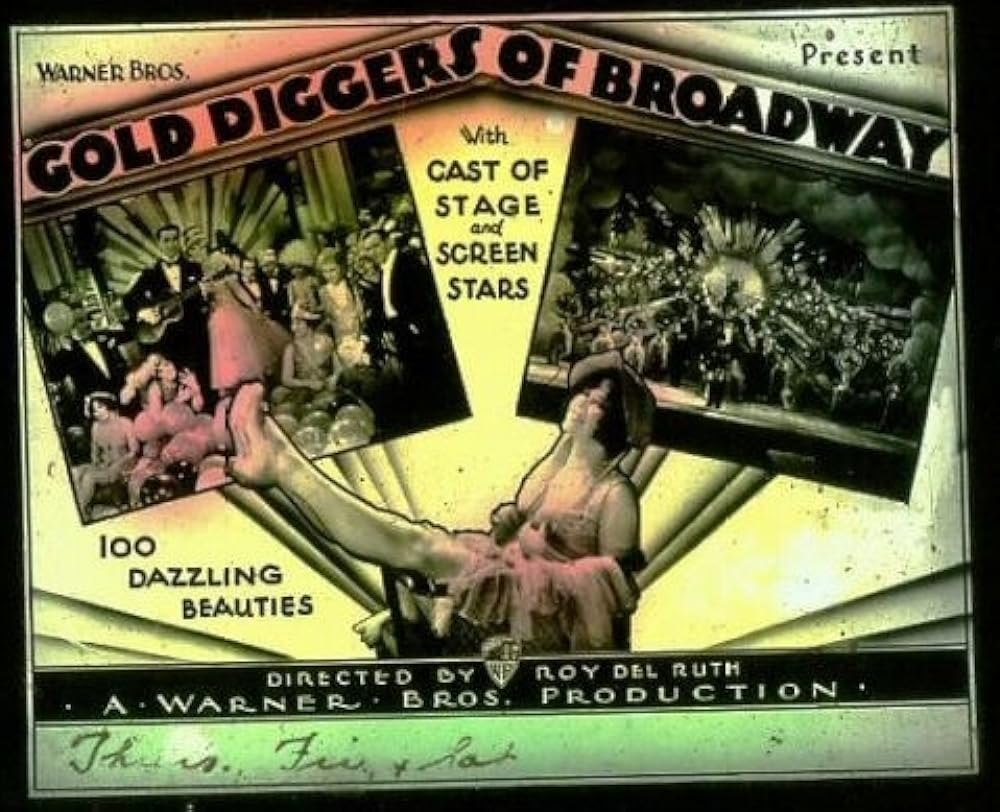
Lantern slide featuring the film

Contemporary reviews by film critics were very positive. Mordaunt Hall wrote in his review for The New York Times:

The fun, coupled with the lovely pastel shades, the tuneful melodies, a sensible narrative, competent acting and elaborate stage settings, resulted in an extraordinarily pleasing entertainment. It caused one to meditate in the end on the remarkable progress of the screen, for not only are the voices reproduced with rare precision, but every opportunity is taken of the Technicolor process in producing the hues and glitter of a musical comedy.

Variety called it "a very good entertainment on the screen" and highly acclaimed Lightner's performance, writing, "Somebody tossed the picture right into Winnie Lightner's lap, or else she stole it." It, too, was very impressed by the color process, writing, "While the Warners' Say It with Songs is also an all-colored talker, somehow here the Technicolor process appears to give a greater strength to the picture; a part of it."

John Mosher of The New Yorker gave the film a positive review, calling the songs "exceptionally audible" and "unusually good". The Film Daily said it had "good music" and a story that was "generally amusing even if not particularly substantial", concluding that Lightner "does much to send the picture over."

== Film preservation ==
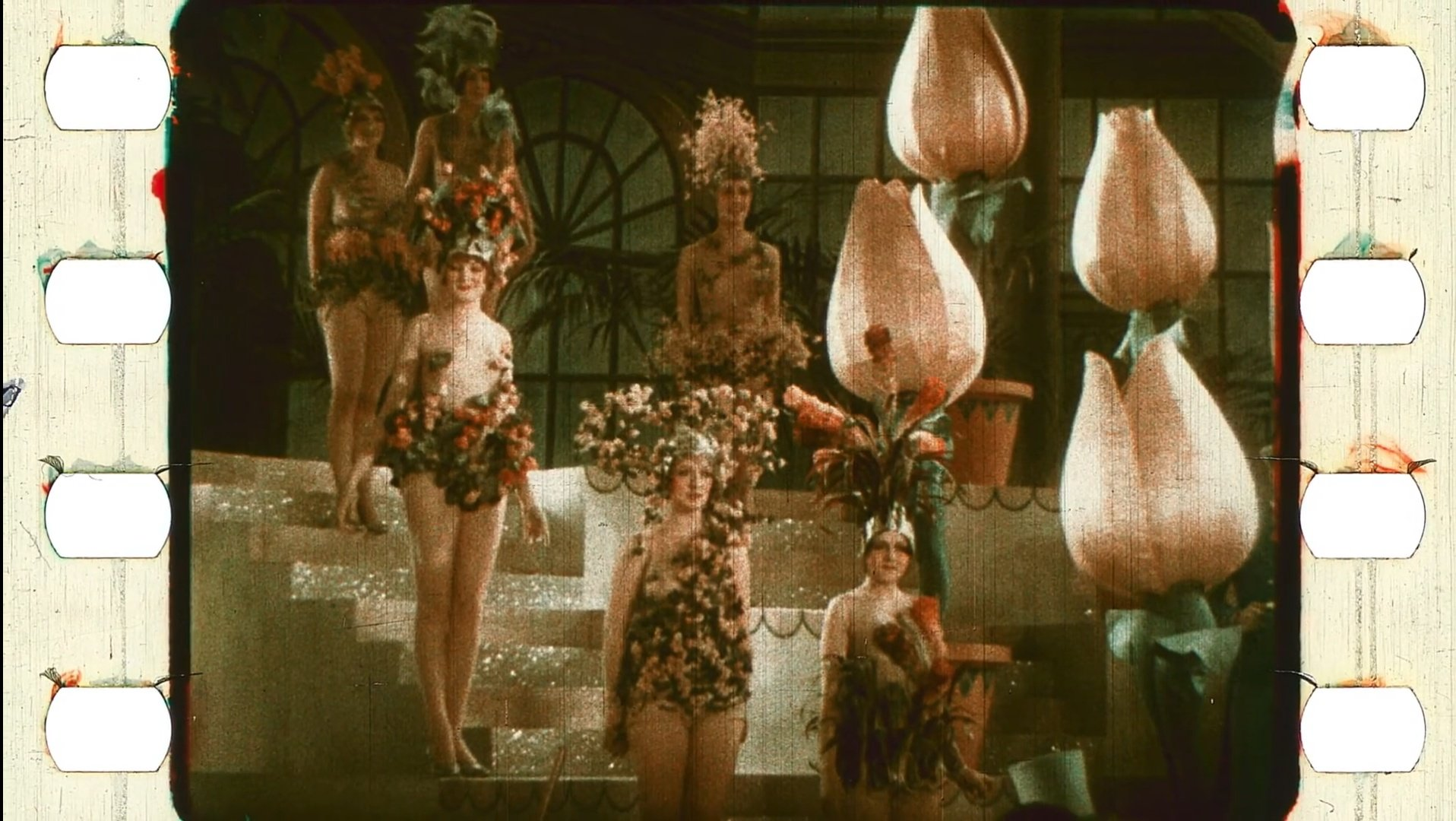
A frame of film from the reprise of "Tip-toe Thru' the Tulips with Me".

Gold Diggers of Broadway was filmed using the Vitaphone sound-on-disc system and released on eleven reels of full frame 35mm nitrate film, two-component imbibition prints by Technicolor, with accompanying Vitaphone soundtrack discs. The discs, including the trailer, overture, and exit music, have survived, but until around 1986 nothing was believed to have survived of the prints. At that time, an original print of the final reel, minus the final minute, was donated to the British Film Institute. It was copied to safety film and thus preserved. Nearly ten years later, another reel was discovered in Australia, the end of the distribution line. It proved to be the penultimate reel, featuring the "Tip-toe Thru' the Tulips With Me" production number. It was missing a short bridging sequence. Only four brief fragments from earlier reels are known to survive: a few seconds from the "Song of the Gold Diggers" number, in black-and-white and with superimposed text, in the trailer for Gold Diggers of 1937; a 35mm nitrate fragment from the same number, running about twenty seconds, found included with a toy projector bought on eBay; another 35mm nitrate fragment, also running less than a minute, from a non-musical scene featuring Lightner and Gran, which was found with fragments from another film in a small museum; and a 25-second 35 mm nitrate fragment of Lightner waking up after the party, which is stored at the BFI. Parts of the soundtrack of the second reel were not available for listening for nearly 80 years, but the Vitaphone Soundtrack Project released it on April 17, 2025. The BFI holds various excerpts in color.

A compilation of the existing footage and sounds from all 11 reels of the film

Two excerpts from the film were to have been released as bonus features on the 80th Anniversary 3-Disc Deluxe Edition DVD of The Jazz Singer, but due to an error only one was included. The excerpt identified as "Tip-toe Through the Tulips" is actually the finale, and the excerpt identified as the finale is actually a ballet sequence from MGM's The Rogue Song, another two-color Technicolor film for which only fragments of the picture element are known to exist. The correct pair of excerpts can be found on the Warner Bros. DVD release of Gold Diggers of 1937.

In 2003, the Vitaphone project reported finding fragments of Gold Diggers of Broadway in a small Scottish film museum. Attached was a photo of a frame of reel 7, with Nick singing "Go to Bed" in the kitchen. YouTube user Old Films and Stuff has also found fragments of the film considered lost.

Preservation status of Gold Diggers of Broadway
Reel(s)	Preservation
1–3	Fragments and soundtrack discs exist.
4–6	Film presumed lost, soundtrack discs exist.
7-9	Fragments and soundtrack discs exist.
10-11	Film survives except final minute of reel and bridging sequence, soundtrack discs exist.

== In popular culture ==
- Gold Diggers of Broadway is referenced in Michael Moorcock's book Breakfast in the Ruins. In a scene set in 1929, an American boy takes his girlfriend to see it.
- Another reference is in Ariel Archer's book “Bridges of Onyx and Gold,” where the two protagonists attend the film's debut in New York in late August 1929.

== See also ==
- List of early color feature films
- List of early sound feature films (1926–1929)
- List of Warner Bros. films (1918–1929)
- List of incomplete or partially lost films
- List of early Warner Bros. talking features
