= Gold Diggers of 1937 =

1936 film by Busby Berkeley, Lloyd Bacon

- theatrical release poster
- Directed by: Lloyd Bacon
- Screenplay by: Warren Duff; Tom Reed (screenplay constructor)
- Based on: Sweet Mystery of Life; 1935 play by Richard Maibaum; Michael Wallace; George Haight
- Produced by: Jack L. Warner; Hal B. Wallis
- Starring: Dick Powell; Joan Blondell; Glenda Farrell; Victor Moore
- Cinematography: Arthur Edeson
- Edited by: Thomas Richards
- Music by: Harold Arlen (music) & E.Y. Harburg (lyrics) and Harry Warren (music) & Al Dubin (lyrics)
- Production company: Warner Bros. Pictures
- Distributed by: Warner Bros. Pictures
- Release date: December 26, 1936
- Running time: 101 minutes
- Country: United States
- Language: English

Gold Diggers of 1937 is a Warner Bros. musical film directed by Lloyd Bacon with musical numbers created and directed by Busby Berkeley. The film stars Dick Powell and Joan Blondell, who were married at the time, with Glenda Farrell and Victor Moore.

The film features songs by the teams of Harold Arlen and E.Y. Harburg, and Harry Warren and Al Dubin. It was based on the play Sweet Mystery of Life by Richard Maibaum, Michael Wallach and George Haight, which ran briefly on Broadway in 1935. Warren Duff wrote the screenplay with the assistance of Tom Reed, who was billed as "Screenplay constructor".

This is the fifth movie in Warner Bros.' series of Gold Digger films, following the now lost films The Gold Diggers (1923), a silent film, and the partially lost sound film Gold Diggers of Broadway (1929), as well as Gold Diggers of 1933 – a remake of The Gold Diggers and the first to feature Busby Berkeley's extravagant production numbers – and Gold Diggers of 1935. Gold Diggers of 1937 was followed by Gold Diggers in Paris (1938).

== Plot ==
Meek, aging, hypochondriac stage producer J.J. Hobart, who always thinks he is about to die, is going to mount a new show, but his partners Morty Wethered and Tom Hugo lost the money for the show in the stock market. On the advice of chorus girl Genevieve Larkin, they insure J.J. for a million dollars, so that when he dies, they will have the money they need to produce the show. Genevieve's friend, ex-chorus girl Norma Perry is sweet on insurance salesman Rosmer "Rossi" Peek, and he writes the policy.

When Rossi's boss, Andy Callahan finds out how old J.J. is, he is afraid he will not pass the physical, but when J.J. does, Rossi decides he has to keep J.J. alive as long as possible, to reap the rewards of his sale. On the other hand, Morty and Hugo have everything to gain if J.J. dies, and they try to help things along. When that fails, they talk Genevieve into seducing J.J., but she ends up falling in love with him instead. Rossi finds out the reason for the insurance policy, and talks his boss, Callahan, into investing in J.J.'s show, to save the company the money it would have to pay if J.J. dropped dead after learning he was broke and could not put on the show. When the show is a success Genevieve and J.J. get married, and so do Norma and Rossi.

== Cast ==
Busby Berkeley's "All's Fair in Love and War" production number from Gold Diggers of 1937.

- Dick Powell as Rosmer " Rossi" Peek
- Joan Blondell as Norma Perry
- Glenda Farrell as Genevieve "Gen" Larkin
- Victor Moore as J. J. Hobart
- Lee Dixon as Boop Oglethorpe
- Osgood Perkins as Morty Wethered
- Charles D. Brown as Tom Hugo
- Rosalind Marquis as Sally LaVerne
- Irene Ware as Irene
- William B. Davidson as Andy Callahan
- Olin Howland as Dr. MacDuffy
- Charles Halton as Dr. Bell
- Paul Irving as Dr. Warshof
- Harry C. Bradley as Dr. Henry
- Joseph Crehan as Chairman
- Susan Fleming as Lucille Bailey

== Songs ==
The production numbers were created, designed, staged and directed by Busby Berkeley. Originally, all the songs for the film were to have been written by Harold Arlen and E.Y. "Yip" Harburg, but Berkeley was dissatisfied and brought in Harry Warren and Al Dubin, who had contributed songs to his previous Warner Bros. films. Their song "With Plenty of Money and You" (which was subtitled "The Gold Diggers' Lullaby") became a hit.

- "Speaking of the Weather" - by Harold Arlen (music) and E.Y. Harburg (lyrics)
- "Let's Put Our Heads Together" - by Arlen and Harburg
- "With Plenty of Money and You (The Gold Diggers' Lullaby)" - by Harry Warren (music) and Al Dubin (lyrics)
- "Life Insurance Song" - by Arlen and Harburg
- "All's Fair in Love and War" - by Warren and Dubin – The staging for this number utilized 104 women in white military uniforms tapping in military formations and geometric patterns.
- "Hush Mah Mouth" - by Arlen and Harburg (deleted from final print)

== Production ==
Richard Mauraum wrote the original play Sweet Mystery of Life. It was rewritten by George Haight. Michael Wallach was also credited as a writer on Broadway. Film rights were sold to Warner Bros for $100,000 just before opening. The play was a flop.

Although Busby Berkeley had directed Gold Diggers of 1935, for this film the director's chair was occupied by Warner Bros. comedy veteran Lloyd Bacon, who had collaborated with Berkeley on 42nd Street. Gold Diggers of 1937 marked Victor Moore's return to the screen after a two-year absence following the films Gift of Gab and Swing Time, during which he starred in Anything Goes on Broadway.

The film was in production at Warner Bros. Burbank studio beginning in mid-July 1936, and premiered on 26 December 1936. It went into general release two days later.

== Critical reception ==
The New York Times commented that the film lacked originality and wrote, "it is clearly the lack of ideas which makes the current "Gold Diggers" on the whole a disappointing Christmas package." It said that the film contained "two or three songs with acceptable tunes and wordage." Although there was a "plenitude of talent", the talent was largely wasted, however Joan Blondell is "a joy forever."

Variety wrote that while the storylines of previous "Gold Digger" films lacked substance, "the current musical opus gets moving with the advantage of a trim backstage yarn." The performances of Dick Powell, Glenda Farrell, Victor Moore and Joan Blondell were well received.

In their March, 1937 edition, Modern Screen gave the film a three-star review and wrote that it was the first of the "Gold Diggers" series to break away from the "ancient plot about the little chorus girl who gets her chance on the opening night of the big show" and that the storyline provided a "legitimate excuse for the customary big show." The review highlighted several of the performances and said "Glenda Farrell steals the female comedy honors, and in the men's department the laurel leaves go to Victor Moore, who makes the aged producer a very funny guy. There is first-rate tap dancing by Lee Dixon, and a fine satiric bit by William Davidson as head of the insurance company."

== Awards and honors ==
In 1937, Busby Berkeley was nominated for an Academy Award for Best Dance Direction for the "All's Fair in Love and War" production number. Hermes Pan won for the "Funhouse sequence" in A Damsel in Distress.

== Adaptation ==
A one-hour radio adaptation, titled Gold Diggers, aired on Lux Radio Theatre on December 21, 1936. During the introduction, host Cecil B. DeMille explained that this adaptation combined the plot of Gold Diggers of 1933 with the music of Gold Diggers of 1937. This radio adaptation starred Dick Powell and Joan Blondell, who had appeared in both movies.
