= Busby Berkeley =

American film director and musical choreographer (1895–1976)

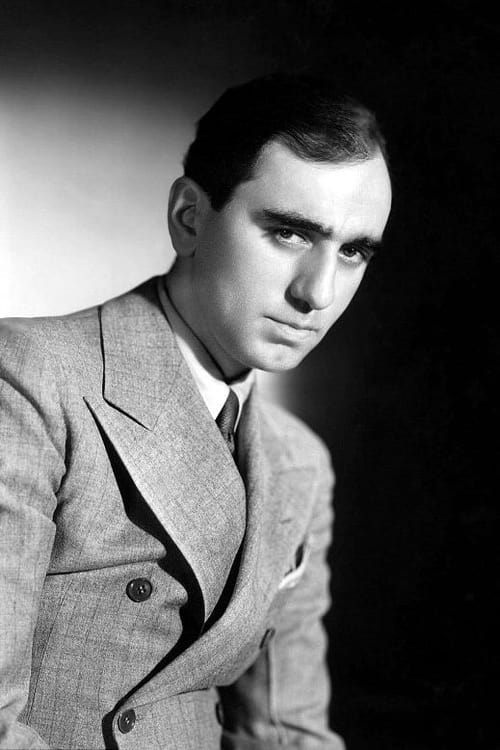
- Berkeley c. 1935
- Born: Berkeley William Enos; November 29, 1895; Los Angeles, California, U.S.
- Died: March 14, 1976 (aged 80); Palm Desert, California, U.S.
- Resting place: Desert Memorial Park, Cathedral City, California
- Occupations: Film director; choreographer
- Years active: 1927–1971
- Mother: Gertrude Berkeley

Berkeley William Enos (November 29, 1895 – March 14, 1976), known professionally as Busby Berkeley, was an American film director and musical choreographer, best known for his collaboration with Warner Brothers in the early to mid-1930s. Berkeley devised elaborate musical production numbers that often involved complex geometric patterns. His work used large numbers of showgirls and props as fantasy elements in kaleidoscopic on-screen performances.

== Early life ==
Berkeley was born in Los Angeles, California, to the stage actor Francis Enos (1863–1904) and the stage actress Gertrude Berkeley (1864–1946). Among Gertrude's friends, and a performer in Tim Frawly's Stock company run by Busby Berkeley's father, were actress Amy Busby from whom Berkeley gained the appellation "Buzz" or "Busby", and actor William Gillette. Whether he was christened Busby Berkeley William Enos, or Berkeley William Enos, with Busby's being a nickname, is unknown – the "Child's names" entry on his birth certificate is blank.

In addition to her stage work, Gertrude played mother roles in silent films while Berkeley was still a child. Berkeley made his stage début at five, acting in the company of his performing family.

In 1917, he lived in Athol, Massachusetts, working as an advertising and sales manager. During World War I, Berkeley served in the U.S. Army as a field artillery lieutenant, drilling 1,200 soldiers in complex choreography.

== Career ==
=== Early years ===
During the 1920s, Berkeley was a dance director for nearly two dozen Broadway musicals, including hits such as A Connecticut Yankee. As a choreographer, Berkeley was less concerned with the dancing skills of his chorus girls as he was with their ability to form themselves into attractive geometric patterns. His musical numbers were among the larger and better-regimented on Broadway.

His earliest film work was in Samuel Goldwyn's Eddie Cantor musicals, where he began developing such techniques as a "parade of faces" (individualizing each chorus girl with a loving close-up), and moving his dancers all over the stage (and often beyond) in as many kaleidoscopic patterns as possible. Berkeley's top shot technique (the kaleidoscope again, this time shot from overhead) appeared seminally in the Cantor films, and also the 1932 Universal film Night World (where he choreographed the number "Who's Your Little Who-Zis?").

=== Groundbreaking choreographer ===
The "By a Waterfall" production number from Footlight Parade (1933) made use of one of the largest soundstages ever built, specially constructed by Warner Bros. to film Berkeley's creations.

Berkeley's numbers were known for starting in the realm of the stage, but quickly exceeding this space by moving into a time and place that could only be cinematic, to return to shots of an applauding audience and the fall of a curtain. He used one camera to achieve this, instead of the usual four, to retain control over his vision so no director could edit the film. As choreographer, Berkeley was allowed a certain degree of independence in his direction of musical numbers, and they were often markedly distinct from (and sometimes in contrast to) the narrative sections of the films. He often did not even see the other sections of the picture. The numbers he choreographed were mostly upbeat and focused on decoration as opposed to substance, some costing around $10,000 per minute more than the picture they were in. One dramatic exception was "Remember My Forgotten Man" from Gold Diggers of 1933, which dealt with the mistreatment of World War I veterans during the Great Depression.

Berkeley's popularity with an entertainment-hungry Depression audience was secured when he choreographed five musicals back-to-back for Warner Bros.: 42nd Street, Footlight Parade, the aforementioned Gold Diggers of 1933, Dames, and Fashions of 1934, as well as In Caliente and Wonder Bar with Dolores del Río. Berkeley always denied any deep significance to his work, arguing that his main professional goals were to top himself and never repeat his past accomplishments.

As the outsized musicals in which Berkeley specialized became passé, he turned to directing dramatic stories. The results were 1939's They Made Me a Criminal starring John Garfield, and 1940's Forty Little Mothers, notable for Eddie Cantor's only dramatic screen performance. Berkeley had several well-publicized run-ins with MGM stars such as Judy Garland. In 1943, he was removed as director of Girl Crazy because of disagreements with Garland, but the lavish musical number "I Got Rhythm", which he directed, remained in the picture.

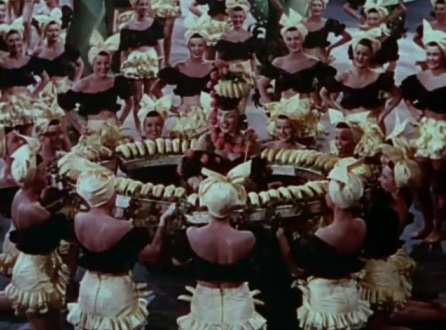
Carmen Miranda in The Gang's All Here (1943)

His next stop was at 20th Century-Fox for 1943's The Gang's All Here, in which Berkeley choreographed Carmen Miranda's "Lady in the Tutti-Frutti Hat" number. The film made money, but Berkeley and the Fox brass disagreed over budget matters. Berkeley returned to MGM in the late 1940s, where he conceived the Technicolor finales for the studio's Esther Williams films. Berkeley's final film as choreographer was MGM's Billy Rose's Jumbo (1962).

=== Later years ===
In the late 1960s, the camp craze brought the Berkeley musicals back to the forefront, and he toured the college and lecture circuit giving talks about his career. The 75-year-old Berkeley returned to Broadway to direct a successful revival of No No Nanette, starring his old Warner Brothers colleague and 42nd Street star Ruby Keeler; both played cameos in the 1970 film The Phynx the same year.

== Personal life ==
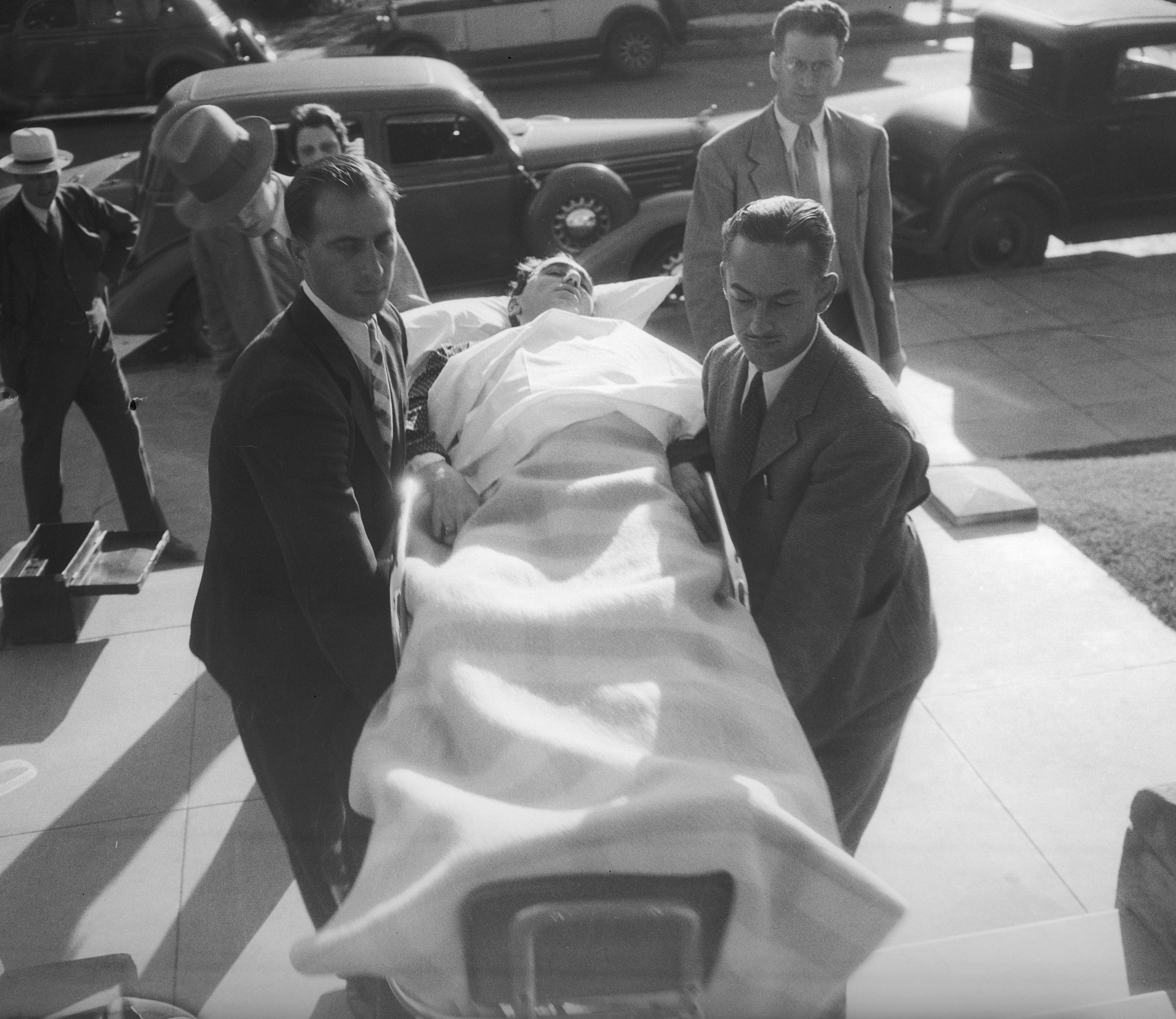
Berkeley being carried into his trial on a stretcher, September 1935

In 1937, Berkeley purchased the Guasti Villa, located at 3500 W. Adams Boulevard, in the West Adams district of Los Angeles. Berkeley owned the home, built in 1910, until 1944. Because of the association with Berkeley, the home is now Los Angeles Historic-Cultural Monument No. 478.

Berkeley was married six times. His wives included actresses Merna Kennedy, Esther Muir, the starlet Claire James, and Etta Dunn, who survived him. He was involved in an alienation of affections lawsuit in 1938 involving Carole Landis, and he was engaged to Lorraine Stein.

Berkeley drank heavily, often having martinis in his daily bath.

In September 1935, Berkeley was responsible for an automobile crash in which two people were killed and five seriously injured. Badly cut and bruised, he was brought to court on a stretcher, where Time magazine reported he heard testimony that made him wince:

'Witnesses testified that motorist Berkeley sped down Roosevelt Highway in Los Angeles County one night, changed lanes, crashing headlong into one car, sideswiped another. Some witnesses said they smelled liquor on him'.

The first two trials for second degree murder ended with hung juries; he was acquitted in a third.

After his mother died and his career began to slow, he attempted suicide, slitting his wrists and taking an overdose of sleeping pills in July 1946. He was admitted to a hospital for an extended stay, an experience which severely affected his mental state.

Berkeley died from natural causes on March 14, 1976, in Palm Springs, California at the age of 80. He is buried in the Desert Memorial Park in Cathedral City, California.

== Legacy ==
Berkeley was inducted into the National Museum of Dance's Mr. & Mrs. Cornelius Vanderbilt Whitney Hall of Fame in 1988.

== Broadway credits ==
- A Connecticut Yankee (1927, choreographer)
- No, No, Nanette (1971, production supervisor)

== Filmography ==
Year	Title	Director	Choreographer	Notes
1930	Whoopee!	No	Yes	
1931	Flying High		Yes	
1931	Palmy Days	No	Yes	
1931	Kiki	No	Yes	
1931	Sky Devils	No	No	dance director
1932	The Kid from Spain	No	Yes	
1932	Night World	No	Yes	
1932	Bird of Paradise	No	Yes	choreographer of native dances
1933	She Had to Say Yes	Yes	No	directorial debut
1933	42nd Street	No	Yes	
1933	Gold Diggers of 1933	No	Yes	
1933	Footlight Parade	No	Yes	
1933	Roman Scandals	No	Yes	
1934	Fashions of 1934	Yes	Yes	
1934	Wonder Bar	No	No	designer of musical numbers
1934	Dames	Yes	Yes	choreographer of musical numbers
1935	Gold Diggers of 1935	Yes	Yes	also created and staged dances
1935	In Caliente	Yes	Yes	choreographer of musical numbers
1935	I Live for Love	Yes	No	
1936	Gold Diggers of 1937	Yes	Yes	choreographer of musical numbers
1936	Stage Struck	Yes	No	
1937	The Go Getter	Yes	No	
1937	The Singing Marine	Yes	Yes	choreographer of musical numbers
1937	Hollywood Hotel	Yes	No	
1937	Varsity Show	Yes	No	director of finale
1938	Gold Diggers in Paris	Yes	Yes	choreographer of musical numbers
1938	Men Are Such Fools	Yes	No	
1938	Comet Over Broadway	Yes	No	replaced by John Farrow
1938	Garden of the Moon	Yes	No	
1939	They Made Me a Criminal	Yes	No	
1939	Fast and Furious	Yes	No	
1939	Broadway Serenade	Yes	No	director of finale
1939	Babes in Arms	Yes	No	
1940	Strike Up the Band	Yes	No	
1940	Forty Little Mothers	Yes	No	
1941	Ziegfeld Girl	Yes	No	director of musical numbers
1941	Babes on Broadway	Yes	No	
1941	Lady Be Good	Yes	No	director of musical numbers
1942	For Me and My Gal	Yes	No	
1943	Cabin in the Sky	Yes	No	director of "Shine" sequence
1943	Girl Crazy	Yes	No	director of "I Got Rhythm" finale
1943	The Gang's All Here	Yes	No	
1946	Cinderella Jones	Yes	No	
1948	Romance on the High Seas	No	Yes	
1949	Take Me Out to the Ball Game	Yes	No	
1951	Call Me Mister	No	Yes	
1951	Two Tickets to Broadway	No	Yes	
1952	Million Dollar Mermaid	No	Yes	
1953	Small Town Girl	No	Yes	
1953	Easy to Love	No	Yes	
1954	Rose Marie	No	Yes	
1962	Billy Rose's Jumbo	No	Yes	

== See also ==
- Busby Berkeley using alternate takes to circumvent censorship
