= Gold Diggers of 1933 =

1933 film by Mervyn LeRoy

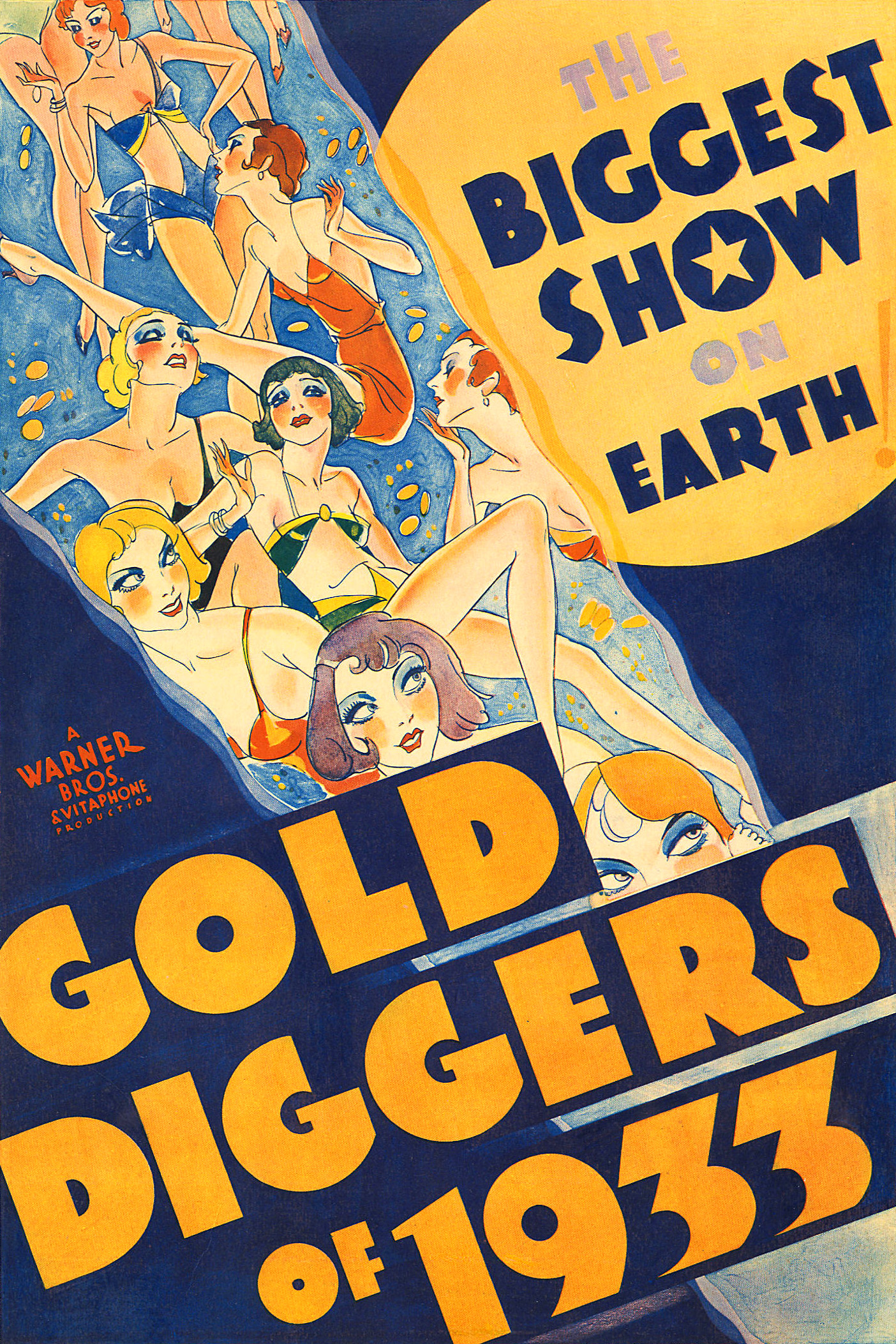
- Theatrical release poster
- Directed by: Mervyn LeRoy; Busby Berkeley (musical sequences)
- Written by: Screenplay: Erwin S. Gelsey; James Seymour; Dialogue: Ben Markson; David Boehm
- Based on: The Gold Diggers; 1919 play by Avery Hopwood
- Produced by: Robert Lord; Jack L. Warner
- Starring: Warren William; Joan Blondell; Aline MacMahon; Ruby Keeler; Dick Powell
- Cinematography: Sol Polito
- Edited by: George Amy
- Music by: Harry Warren (music); Al Dubin (lyrics)
- Production company: Warner Bros. Pictures
- Distributed by: Warner Bros. Pictures
- Release date: May 27, 1933 (US)
- Running time: 90 or 96 minutes
- Country: United States
- Language: English
- Budget: $433,000
- Box office: $3,231,000 (worldwide rentals)

Gold Diggers of 1933 is an American pre-Code musical film directed by Mervyn LeRoy, with songs by Harry Warren (music) and Al Dubin (lyrics). The film's numbers were staged and choreographed by Busby Berkeley. It starred Warren William, Joan Blondell, Aline MacMahon, Ruby Keeler, and Dick Powell. It also featured appearances by Guy Kibbee, Ned Sparks and Ginger Rogers.

The story is loosely based on the play The Gold Diggers by Avery Hopwood, which had its Broadway run for 717 performances in 1919 and 1920. The play was adapted into a 1923 silent film by David Belasco, the producer of the Broadway play, as The Gold Diggers, starring Hope Hampton and Wyndham Standing, and again as a talkie in 1929, directed by Roy Del Ruth. That film, Gold Diggers of Broadway, which starred Nancy Welford and Conway Tearle, was one of the biggest box-office hits of that year.

Gold Diggers of 1933 was one of the highest-grossing motion pictures of the year, earning over $2.2 million at the box office.

This version of Hopwood's play was written by James Seymour and Erwin S. Gelsey, with additional dialogue by David Boehm and Ben Markson.

In 2003, Gold Diggers of 1933 was selected for preservation in the United States National Film Registry by the Library of Congress as being "culturally, historically, or aesthetically significant".

== Plot ==
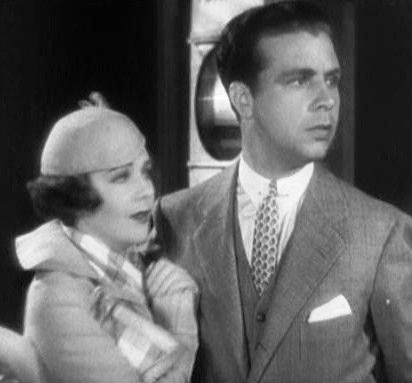
Ruby Keeler and Dick Powell

The "gold diggers" are four aspiring actresses: Polly, an ingenue; Carol, a torch singer; Trixie, a comedian; and Fay, a glamour puss.

The film was made in 1933, during the Great Depression, and contains numerous direct references to it. It begins with a rehearsal for a stage show, which is interrupted by the producer's creditors who close down the show because of unpaid bills.

At the unglamorous apartment shared by three of the four actresses (Polly, Carol, and Trixie), the producer, Barney Hopkins, is in despair because he has everything he needs to put on a show, except money. He hears Brad Roberts, the girls' neighbor and Polly's boyfriend, playing the piano. Brad is a brilliant songwriter and singer who not only has written the music for a show, but also offers Hopkins $15,000 in cash to back the production. Of course, they all think he is kidding, but he insists that he is serious – he offers to back the show, but refuses to perform in it, despite his talent and voice.

Brad comes through with the money and the show goes into production, but the girls are suspicious that he must be a criminal since he is cagey about his past and will not appear in the show, even though he is clearly more talented than the aging juvenile lead they have hired. It turns out, however, that Brad is in fact a millionaire's son whose family does not want him associating with the theatre. On opening night, in order to save the show when the juvenile cannot perform (due to his lumbago acting up), Brad is forced to play the lead role.

With the resulting publicity, Brad's brother J. Lawrence Bradford and family lawyer Faneuil H. Peabody discover what he is doing and go to New York to save him from being seduced by a "gold digger".

Lawrence mistakenly identifies Carol as Polly, and his heavy-handed effort to dissuade the "cheap and vulgar" showgirl from marrying Brad by buying her off annoys her so much that Carol plays along, but the two fall in love. Meanwhile, Trixie targets Peabody as the perfect rich sap ripe for exploitation. When Lawrence finds out that Brad and the real Polly have wed, he threatens to have the marriage annulled, but relents when Carol refuses to marry him if he does. Trixie marries Peabody. All the "gold diggers" end up with wealthy men.

== Cast ==
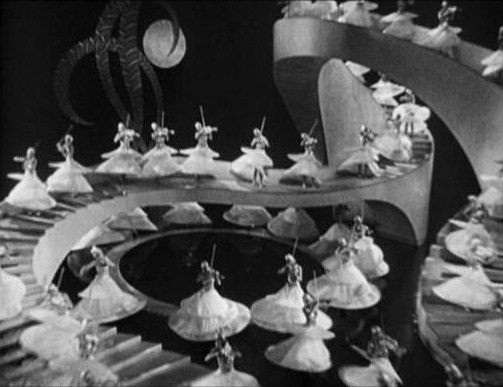
Busby Berkeley's "Waltz of the Shadows" production number, from the trailer for the film

The "We're in the Money" production number

From the 1933 trailer:
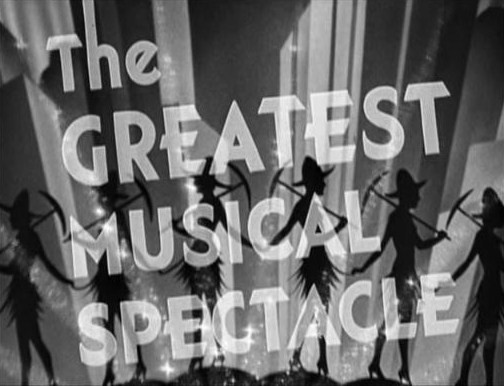
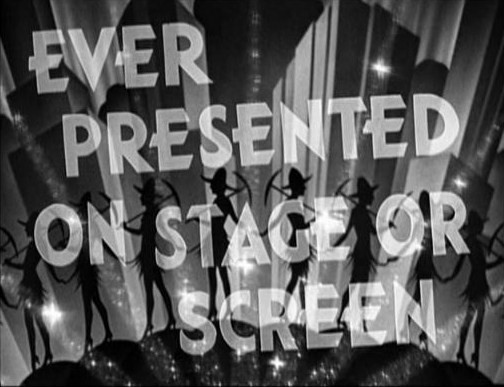
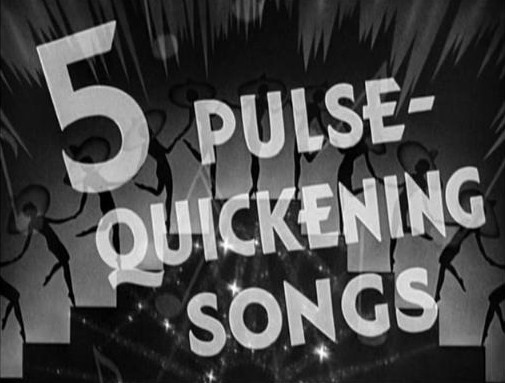
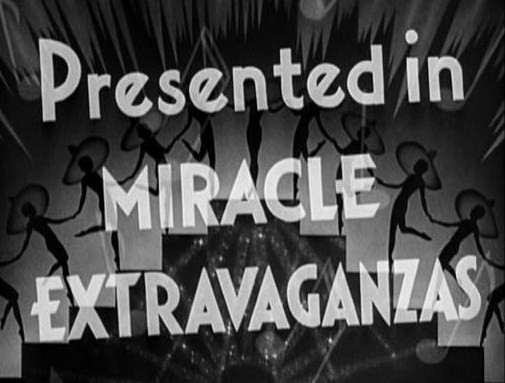
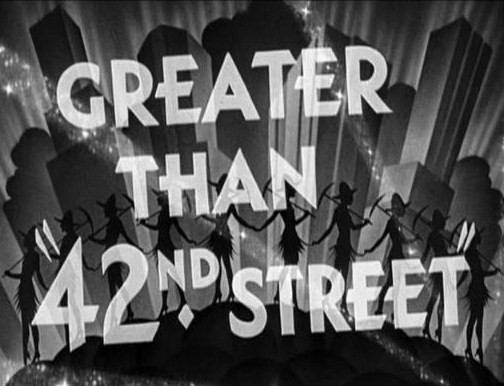
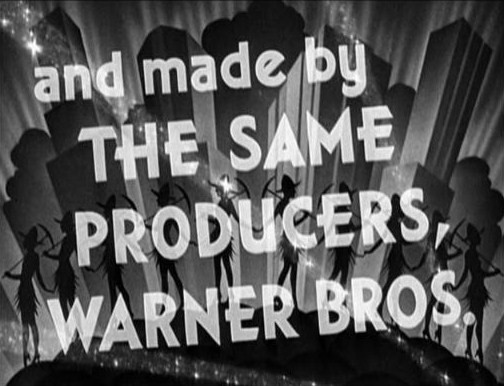
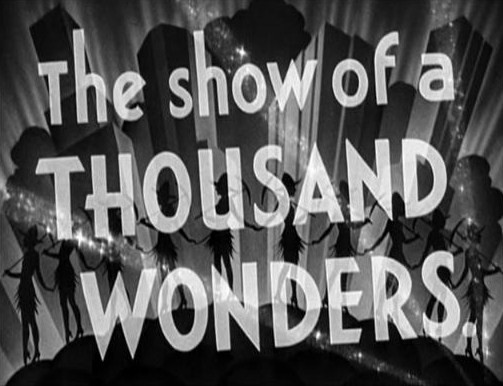
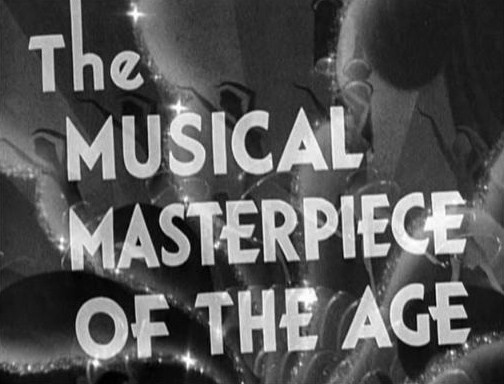
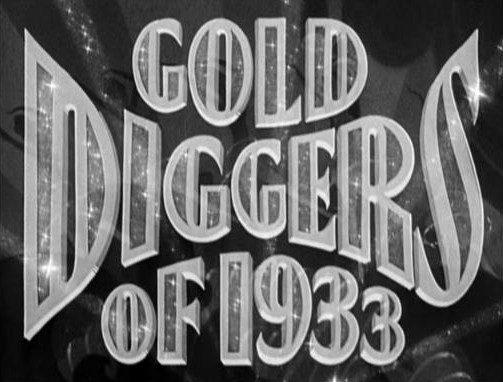
- Warren William as J. Lawrence Bradford
- Joan Blondell (singing voice dubbed by Jeane Cowann) as Carol King
- Aline MacMahon as Trixie Lorraine
- Ruby Keeler as Polly Parker
- Dick Powell as "Brad Roberts" (actually Robert Treat Bradford)
- Guy Kibbee as Faneuil H. Peabody
- Ned Sparks as Barney Hopkins
- Ginger Rogers as Fay Fortune
- Etta Moten as soloist in "Remember My Forgotten Man" (uncredited)
- Jeane Cowan as Joan Blondell's singing voice in "Remember My Forgotten Man" (uncredited)
- Billy Barty as The Baby in "Pettin' in the Park" (uncredited)

Cast notes:
Character actors Sterling Holloway and Hobart Cavanaugh appear in small roles, as does choreographer Busby Berkeley, as a backstage call boy who yells "Everybody on stage for the 'Forgotten Man' number". Other uncredited cast members include: Robert Agnew, Joan Barclay, Ferdinand Gottschalk, Ann Hovey, Fred Kelsey, Charles Lane, Wallace MacDonald, Wilbur Mack, Dennis O'Keefe, Fred Toones, Dorothy Wellman, Jane Wyman, and Tammany Young.

== Production ==
Gold Diggers of 1933 was originally to be called High Life, and George Brent was an early casting idea for the role played by Warren William.

Early drafts of the screenplay focused on the sensual elements of the story, and subsequent drafts gradually began adding more of the narrative taking place behind the scenes of the show. When 42nd Street turned out to be a big success, the studio decided to make Gold Diggers of 1933 into a musical.

The film was made for an estimated $433,000 at Warner Bros. studios in Burbank, and went into general release on May 27, 1933.

== Reception ==
=== Box office ===
Gold Diggers of 1933 was Warner Bros.' most successful movie of 1933. According to Warner Bros. records the film earned $2,202,000 domestically and $1,029,000 foreign.

The film made a profit of $1,602,530.

=== Awards and honors ===
In 1934, the film was nominated for an Oscar for Best Sound Recording for Nathan Levinson, the film's sound director.

The film was nominated for the following American Film Institute lists:

- 2004: AFI's 100 Years ... 100 Songs: "We're in the Money"
- 2006: AFI's Greatest Movie Musicals

=== Adaptation ===
A one-hour radio adaptation, titled Gold Diggers, aired on Lux Radio Theatre on December 21, 1936. During the introduction host Cecil B. DeMille explained that this adaptation combined the plot of Gold Diggers of 1933 with the music of Gold Diggers of 1937. This radio adaptation starred Dick Powell and Joan Blondell, who had appeared in both movies.

== Musical numbers ==
The film contains four song and dance sequences designed, staged and choreographed by Busby Berkeley. All the songs were written by Harry Warren and Al Dubin. (In the film, when producer Barney Hopkins hears Brad's music he picks up the phone and says: "Cancel my contract with Warren and Dubin!")

"We're in the Money" is sung by Ginger Rogers accompanied by scantily clad showgirls dancing with giant coins. Rogers sings one verse in Pig Latin. During filming, Berkeley overheard Rogers speaking in Pig Latin, and immediately decided to add a Pig Latin verse to the song.

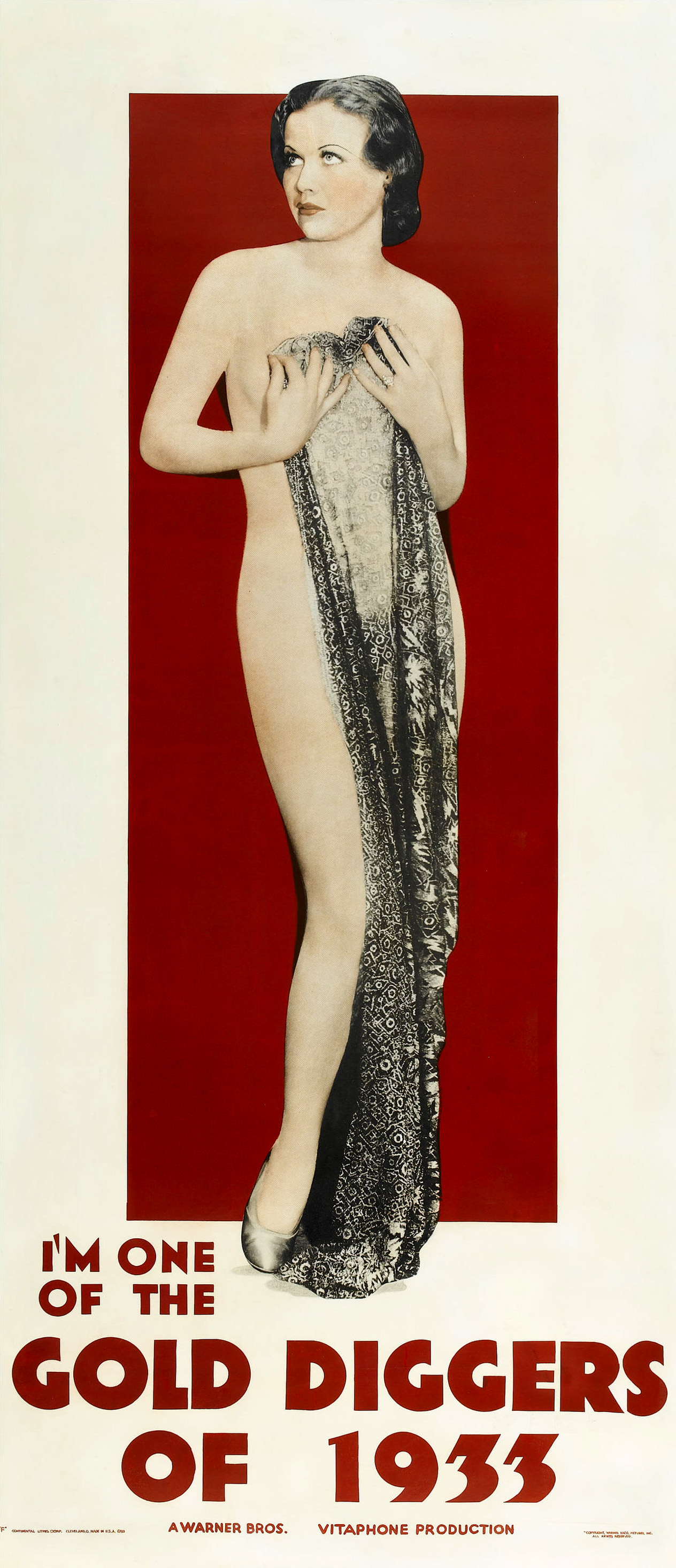
Door panel used to promote the film

"Pettin' in the Park" is sung by Ruby Keeler and Dick Powell. It includes a tap dance from Keeler and a surreal sequence featuring dwarf actor Billy Barty as a baby who escapes from his stroller. During the number, the women get caught in a rainstorm and go behind a backlit screen to remove their wet clothes in silhouette. They emerge in metal garments, which thwart the men's attempts to remove them, until Billy Barty gives Dick Powell a can opener. This number was originally planned to end the film.

"The Shadow Waltz" is sung by Powell and Keeler. It features a dance by Keeler, Rogers, and many female violinists with neon-tubed violins that glow in the dark. Berkeley got the idea for this number from a vaudeville act he once saw – the neon on the violins was an afterthought. On March 10, the Long Beach earthquake hit while this number was being filmed:

[it] caused a blackout and short-circuited some of the dancing violins. Berkeley was almost thrown from the camera boom, dangling by one hand until he could pull himself back up. He yelled for the girls, many of whom were on a 30-foot (9.1 m)-high platform, to sit down until technicians could get the soundstage doors open and let in some light.

"Remember My Forgotten Man" is performed by Joan Blondell, with featured vocal solo by Etta Moten – who also dubbed Blondell's singing voice at the end of the number – and features sets influenced by German Expressionism and a gritty evocation of Depression-era poverty. Berkeley was inspired by the May 1932 war veterans' march on Washington, D.C., and FDR's speech about the "Forgotten Man" from the same year. When the number was finished, Jack L. Warner and Darryl F. Zanuck (the studio production head) were so impressed that they ordered it moved to the end of the film, displacing "Pettin' in the Park".

An additional production number was filmed, but cut before release: "I've Got to Sing a Torch Song" was to have been sung by Ginger Rogers, but instead appears in the film sung by Dick Powell near the beginning.

== Circumventing censorship with alternate footage ==
According to Sin in Soft Focus: Pre-Code Hollywood by Mark A. Vieira, Gold Diggers of 1933 was one of the first American films made and distributed with alternative footage in order to circumvent state censorship problems. Busby Berkeley, the choreographer and director of the musical numbers, used the lavish production numbers as a showcase of the female anatomy that were both "lyrical and lewd". "Pettin' in the Park" and "We're in the Money" are prime examples of this. The state censorship boards had become so troublesome that a number of studios began filming slightly different versions of censorable scenes. In this way, when a film was edited, the "toned down" reels were labeled according to district. One version could be sent to New York City, another to the South, and another to the United Kingdom.

Vieira reports that the film had two different endings: in one, the rocky romance between Warren William and Joan Blondell – whom he calls "cheap and vulgar" – is resolved backstage after the "Forgotten Man" number. In an alternative ending, this scene never takes place and the film ends with the number.
