= Flirtation Walk =

Flirtation Walk may refer to

- Flirtation Walk (West Point), a scenic walk along the Hudson River at the United States Military Academy
- Flirtation Walk (film), a 1934 musical movie about the walk at West Point
- a promenade at the Boston Navy Yard
