= Aleta Freel =

American actress (1907–1935)

- Freel, from the 1928 yearbook of Smith College
- Born: Aleta Freile; June 17, 1907; Jersey City, New Jersey, U.S.
- Died: December 7, 1935 (aged 28); Los Angeles, California, U.S.
- Cause of death: Suicide
- Education: Smith College
- Occupation: Actress
- Years active: 1931–1934
- Spouse: Ross Alexander (1934–1935; her death)
- Parent(s): Dr. and Mrs. William Freile

Aleta Freel (née Aleta Freile; June 14, 1907 – December 7, 1935) was an American stage actress.

== Early life ==
Freel was born Aleta Freile in Jersey City, New Jersey, the daughter of physician Dr. William Freile and the former Minnie Uchtman.

She was educated at the Bergen School for Girls in Jersey City. She graduated from Smith College in 1928.

== Career ==
She played leading roles in several eastern stock companies, including the University Players of Old Silver Beach and the Palm Beach Players. Among Freel's stage performances was a role in the play Double Door, which was performed at the Ritz Theater in New York City in Fall 1933. Her Broadway credits include Louder, Please (1931) and Three Times the Hour (1931).

== Personal life ==
Freel was married to Hollywood actor Ross Alexander following a backstage romance. Alexander was originally from Brooklyn, and began his career in New York. He was cast in many Broadway productions, one of which was The Ladder.

=== Death ===
Freel grew depressed as her career failed to take hold and her marriage to Ross Alexander grew strained. On December 6, 1935, she took a .22 rifle from a gun rack in her home and shot herself through the temple. Freel died early the following morning at Emergency Hospital in Los Angeles. She was 28 years of age. Her husband confided to police that he and Freel had a "small spat" during the evening. She was disappointed about some screen tests on which she had high hopes, but which were unsuccessful.

According to Henry Fonda, who was best man at Freel's wedding, she took her life after confirming that Alexander had been having affairs with other women and not because of her career troubles.

On December 14, 1935, in Sacramento, California, the state of California opened an investigation into the "strange death" of Aleta Freel. The inquiry was requested by Harold G. Hoffman, governor of New Jersey. Friends and relatives of the actress asked Hoffman and Governor Merriam of California for an exhaustive probe. Freel's father William was quoted as saying that, at the time of his daughter's death, he was not sure she took her life.

Nine months later, Alexander married actress Anne Nagel. However, three months later, 13 months after Freel's suicide, he shot and killed himself with a .22 calibre pistol.
