= Queenie Vassar =

Scottish-American actress (1870–1960)

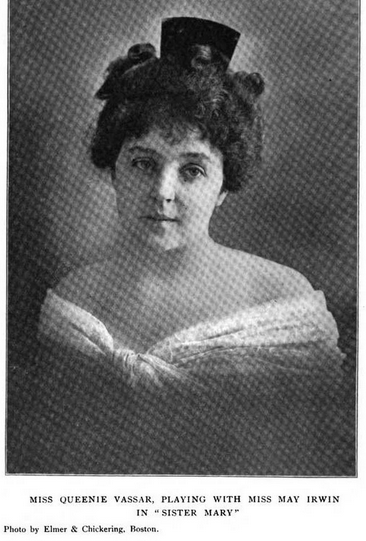
- Vassar in 1900
- Born: Cecilia McMahon; 28 October 1870; Glasgow, Scotland
- Died: 11 September 1960 (aged 89); Hollywood, California, U.S.
- Resting place: Hollywood Forever Cemetery
- Occupation: Actress
- Years active: 1894–1944
- Spouses: Harry A. Kernell (m. 1887; died 1893) William Lynch (m. 1893, divorced) Joseph Cawthorn (m. 1902; died 1949)
- Children: 2

Queenie Vassar (born Cecilia McMahon, 28 October 1870 – 11 September 1960) was a Scottish-born actress on stage and in films.

== Early life ==
Queenie Vassar was born Cecilia McMahon in Glasgow. She was performing from childhood, and moved to the United States at age 13 as the protegee of impresario Tony Pastor.

== Career ==
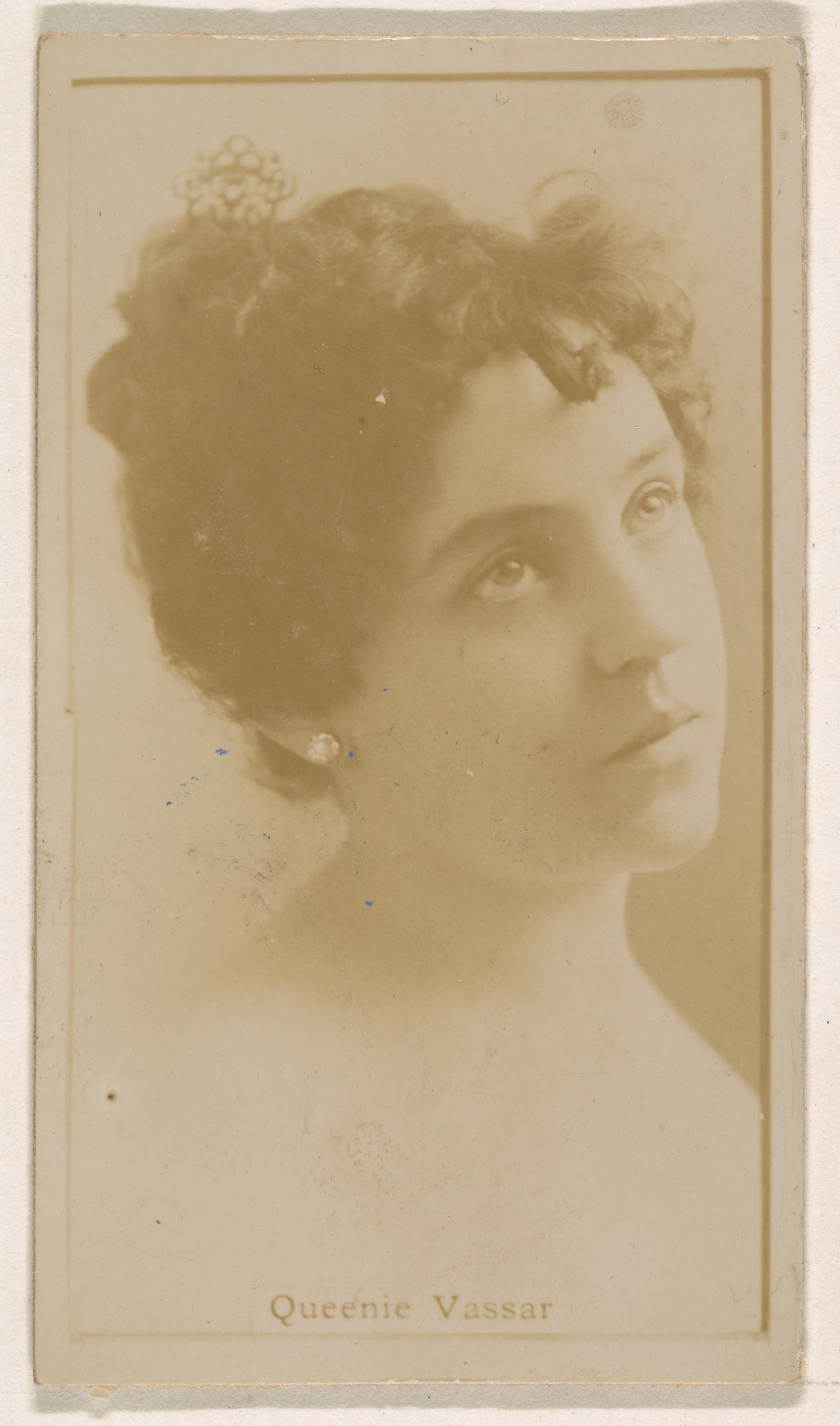
Queenie Vassar, from the Actresses series (N245) issued by Kinney Brothers to promote Sweet Caporal Cigarettes MET DP859761

Vassar appeared on the Broadway stage in shows including The Passing Show (1894), Sister Mary (1900), Belle of Bridgeport (1900), The Ladies Paradise (1901), The Toreador (1902), The Slim Princess (1911), The Lady of the Slipper (1912–1913), The Girl from Utah (1914–1915). Vassar's photo was used on cigarette cards and candy boxes, and in advertisements. She claimed to have been the first actress to ride a bicycle on the Broadway stage.

Vassar emerged from retirement in 1939 to play older women in three films of the 1940s: Primrose Path (1940), Lady in a Jam (1942), None but the Lonely Heart (1944). Her work as Ginger Rogers's grandmother in Primrose Path is considered by one film scholar "one of the most stunningly naturalistic performances by any character actress on record... a wicked joy to behold."

== Personal life ==
Queenie Vassar married three times. She married first to comedian Harry A. Kernell in 1887, when she was seventeen; she was widowed in 1893, with two young sons, Harry and William. She married again in 1893, to William Lynch; they had a daughter and divorced in 1900. Her third and longest marriage was to Joseph Cawthorn, a fellow actor, beginning in 1902. She was widowed in 1949, and died in 1960, aged 89 years. Her gravesite is in the Hollywood Forever cemetery.
