= Here Comes Carter =

1936 film by William Clemens

- Directed by: William Clemens
- Screenplay by: Roy Chanslor
- Story by: Michael Jacoby
- Produced by: Bryan Foy
- Starring: Ross Alexander; Glenda Farrell; Anne Nagel
- Cinematography: Arthur L. Todd
- Edited by: Louis Hesse
- Music by: Howard Jackson
- Production company: First National Pictures
- Distributed by: Warner Bros. Pictures
- Release date: October 24, 1936
- Running time: 58 minutes
- Country: United States
- Language: English

Here Comes Carter is a 1936 American comedy film directed by William Clemens and written by Roy Chanslor. The film stars Ross Alexander, Glenda Farrell and Anne Nagel. Produced by First National Pictures, it was released on October 24, 1936.

== Plot ==
Movie-studio publicist Kent Carter bitterly resents actor Rex Marchbanks trying to steal Linda Warren, the girl he loves. Their feud intensifies when Kent replaces tipsy radio commentator Mel Winter on the air. Kent is unimpressed by the puff pieces sent out by press agents, and insists on broadcasting the unvarnished facts about the movie colony, with frequent pointed remarks about Marchbanks. Kent's fast delivery, candid commentary, and snappy comebacks make him a radio star.

Marchbanks recruits mobster Steve Moran to frighten Kent into submission, but Kent continues his mercurial, no-holds-barred reporting. When Moran sends his henchmen to attack Kent under cover of darkness, Kent retaliates by identifying them publicly from his hospital bed. Linda, furious with Kent, wants him to give up his muck-raking job and pursue a more reputable career. Kent's faithful secretary, Verna Kennedy, can stand no more of Linda treating Kent so badly, and tells Linda the reasons behind Kent's behavior. In the end, Kent wins Linda back after proving that Rex and Moran are actually brothers as well as associates in crime.

== Cast ==
- Ross Alexander as Kent Carter
- Glenda Farrell as Verna Kennedy
- Anne Nagel as Linda Warren
- Craig Reynolds as Rex Marchbanks
- Hobart Cavanaugh as Mel Winter
- Norman Willis as Steve Moran
- John Sheehan as Slugs Dana
- George E. Stone as Boots Burnett, henchman
- Charley Foy as Louie Cramer, henchman
- Joseph Crehan as Daniel Bronson, radio-station boss
- John T. Murray as Ben Rogers, radio producer
- Dennis Moore as Russ McAllen
- Wayne Morris as Bill, hot-dog vendor
- William White as Office Boy
- Spec O'Donnell as Elevator Operator
- Jane Wyman as Nurse

== Production ==
The film went into production as Loudspeaker Lowdown, later changed to The Tattler. One of Ross Alexander's catchphrases in the film is "Here comes trouble," inspiring a change of title to Here Comes Carter. As presented in the original advertising, the title is an exclamation: Here Comes Carter! In Britain the title became The Voice of Scandal.

Warners' "B" features often cast young contract players in small roles, giving them experience as they progressed toward bigger things. In Here Comes Carter the young hopefuls are future stars Wayne Morris and Jane Wyman.

== Post-production ==
As filming came to a close, Ross Alexander proposed marriage to leading lady Anne Nagel. They were wed on September 16, 1936.

The finished film runs only 58 minutes, but the coming-attractions trailer indicates that the original cut was much longer, and includes two scenes not in the movie. Both of the deleted scenes feature Glenda Farrell, setting up a new subplot. The would explain why Farrell is billed second in the cast—her performance was much more substantial, but cut down severely in post-production.

== Songs ==
Music and lyrics by M. K. Jerome and Jack Scholl:

- You on My Mind
- Thru' the Courtesy of Love
