= Joseph Cawthorn =

American actor (1868–1949)

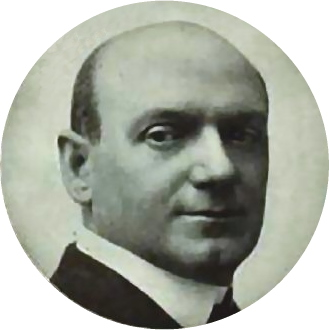
- Cawthorn in 1914
- Born: Joseph Bridger Cawthorn; March 29, 1868; New York City, U.S.
- Died: January 21, 1949 (aged 80); Beverly Hills, California, U.S.
- Occupation: Actor
- Years active: 1872–1942
- Spouse: Queenie Vassar (m. 1902)

Joseph Bridger Cawthorn (March 29, 1868 – January 21, 1949) was an American stage and film comic actor.

== Biography ==
Born on March 29, 1868, in New York City to a minstrel-show family, Cawthorn started out in show business as a child, debuting at Robinson's Music Hall in New York in 1872. He appeared in minstrel shows and vaudeville as a "Dutch" comic, employing a thick German dialect. He later worked in British music halls and American touring companies.

Cawthorn made his Broadway debut in 1895, 1897 or 1898, and embarked on a long career lasting over two decades. His first success was playing Boris in Victor Herbert's 1898 operetta The Fortune Teller. Other notable Broadway roles included the title character in Mother Goose (1903) and inventor Dr. Pill in the fantasy musical Little Nemo (1908). In the latter, he was called upon to ad lib to buy time during one performance while a problem backstage was dealt with. As "the scene called for him to describe imaginary animals he had hunted", he invented the "whiffenpoof" on the spot. Yale students in the audience appropriated it for the name of their glee club.

When his Broadway stardom waned, Cawthorn moved to Hollywood in 1927 and started a second prolific career, appearing in over 50 films, the last in 1942. He played Gremio in the first sound adaptation of The Taming of the Shrew in 1929, starring Mary Pickford and Douglas Fairbanks; Schultz in Gold Diggers of 1935; and Florenz Ziegfeld's father in The Great Ziegfeld (1936).

He was Queenie Vassar's third husband; they were married from 1902 to his death.

Cawthorn died on January 21, 1949, at age 80, in Beverly Hills, California. He is buried in Hollywood Forever cemetery.

== Complete filmography ==
- The Secret Studio (1927) - Pa Merton
- Two Girls Wanted (1927) - Philip Hancock
- Very Confidential (1927) - Donald Allen
- Silk Legs (1927) - Ezra Fulton
- Hold Em' Yale (1928) - Professor George Bradbury
- Speakeasy (1929) - Yokel
- Street Girl (1929) - Keppel - Cafe Owner
- The Taming of the Shrew (1929) - Gremio
- Jazz Heaven (1929) - Herman Kemple
- Dance Hall (1929) - Bremmer
- Dixiana (1930) - Cornelius Van Horn - Carl's Father
- The Princess and the Plumber (1930) - Merkl
- Kiki (1931) - Alfred Rapp
- A Tailor Made Man (1931) - Huber
- The Runaround (1931) - Lou
- Peach O'Reno (1931) - Joe Bruno
- White Zombie (1932) - Dr. Bruner
- Love Me Tonight (1932) - Dr. Armand de Fontinac
- They Call It Sin (1932) - Mr. Hollister
- Men Are Such Fools (1932) - Werner
- Whistling in the Dark (1933) - Otto Barfuss
- Grand Slam (1933) - Alex Alexandrovitch (uncredited)
- Blondie Johnson (1933) - Jewelry Store Manager
- Made on Broadway (1933) - Maxie Schultz
- Best of Enemies (1933) - Gus Schneider
- Broken Dreams (1933) - Pop
- Cold Turkey (1933 short)
- The Cat and the Fiddle (1934) - Rudy
- Lazy River (1934) - Mr. Julius Ambrose
- Glamour (1934) - Ibsen
- Twenty Million Sweethearts (1934) - Herbert Brokman
- The Last Gentleman (1934) - Dr. Wilson
- Housewife (1934) - Krueger
- The Human Side (1934) - Fritz Speigal
- Young and Beautiful (1934) - Herman Cline
- Music in the Air (1934) - Hans Uppman
- Sweet Adeline (1934) - Oscar Schmidt
- Maybe It's Love (1935) - Adolph Sr.
- Sweet Music (1935) - Sidney Selzer
- Naughty Marietta (1935) - Herr Schuman
- Gold Diggers of 1935 (1935) - Schultz
- Smart Girl (1935) - Karl Krausemeyer
- Bright Lights (1935) - Oscar Schlemmer
- Page Miss Glory (1935) - Mr.Freischutz
- Harmony Lane (1935) - Professor Henry Kleber
- Freshman Love (1936) - Wilson, Sr.
- The Great Ziegfeld (1936) - Dr. Ziegfeld
- Brides Are Like That (1936) - Fred Schultz
- One Rainy Afternoon (1936) - Monsieur Pelerin
- Hot Money (1936) - Max Dourfuss
- Crime Over London (1936) - Mr. Sherwood / Reilly
- Lillian Russell (1940) - Leopold Damrosch
- Scatterbrain (1940) - Nicholas Raptis
- So Ends Our Night (1941) - Leopold Potzloch
- The Postman Didn't Ring (1942) - Silas Harwood
