= Hot Money (film) =

1936 film by William C. McGann

- Lantern slide
- Directed by: William C. McGann
- Screenplay by: William Jacobs
- Based on: Hot Money; 1931 play by Aben Kandel
- Produced by: Bryan Foy
- Starring: Ross Alexander; Beverly Roberts; Joseph Cawthorn; Paul Graetz; Andrew Tombes; Cy Kendall
- Cinematography: Arthur Edeson
- Edited by: Clarence Kolster
- Production company: Warner Bros. Pictures
- Distributed by: Warner Bros. Pictures
- Release date: July 18, 1936
- Running time: 68 minutes
- Country: United States
- Language: English

Hot Money is a 1936 American comedy film directed by William C. McGann and written by William Jacobs. The film stars Ross Alexander, Beverly Roberts, Joseph Cawthorn, Paul Graetz, Andrew Tombes and Cy Kendall. The film was released by Warner Bros. Pictures on July 18, 1936. It was based on the play of the same name by Aben Kandel who also co-wrote the screenplay. The story was used twice before in such films as High Pressure (1932) and a French speaking version in the same year Le bluffeur.

== Plot ==
A possibly crazy scientist has apparently invented a formula that can turn water into gasoline. Despite his reluctance, businessman Dourfuss is convinced by con artist Willie to provide seed money. Willie then recruits his pal, fast-talking sharpie Chick Randall, to seek out investors and help sell the product to the public. Chick hires a bunch of derelicts with names like Vanderbilt and Ford to act as the board of directors, as well as a pretty stenographer, Grace Lane. She initially thinks the whole thing is a scam, but a demonstration convinces her it's on the level; in time, they fall in love. But things take an ugly turn when the initial supply runs out and the scientist has disappeared.

== Cast ==
- Ross Alexander as Chick Randall
- Beverly Roberts as Grace Lane
- Joseph Cawthorn as Max Dourfuss
- Paul Graetz as Dr. David
- Andrew Tombes as Willie
- Frank Orth as Hank Ford
- Cy Kendall as Joe Morgan
- George Beranger as Ed Biddle
- Joe Cunningham as Gus Vanderbilt
- Anne Nagel as Ruth McElniney
- Eddie Conrad as Antonio Romenetti
- Harry Burns as Pasquale Romenetti
- Addison Richards as Forbes
- Charley Foy as Ratto
- Robert Emmett Keane as Professor Kimberly
- Edwin Stanley as Joe Thomas

== Reception ==
T.M.P. of The New York Times said, "Patterned somewhat along the lines of Get Rich Quick Wallingford, the new film is neither particularly good nor conspicuously poor farce. Thanks to competent editing and direction, it falls quite gracefully into that niche reserved for "amiable entertainments."
