= Ross Alexander =

American actor (1907–1937)

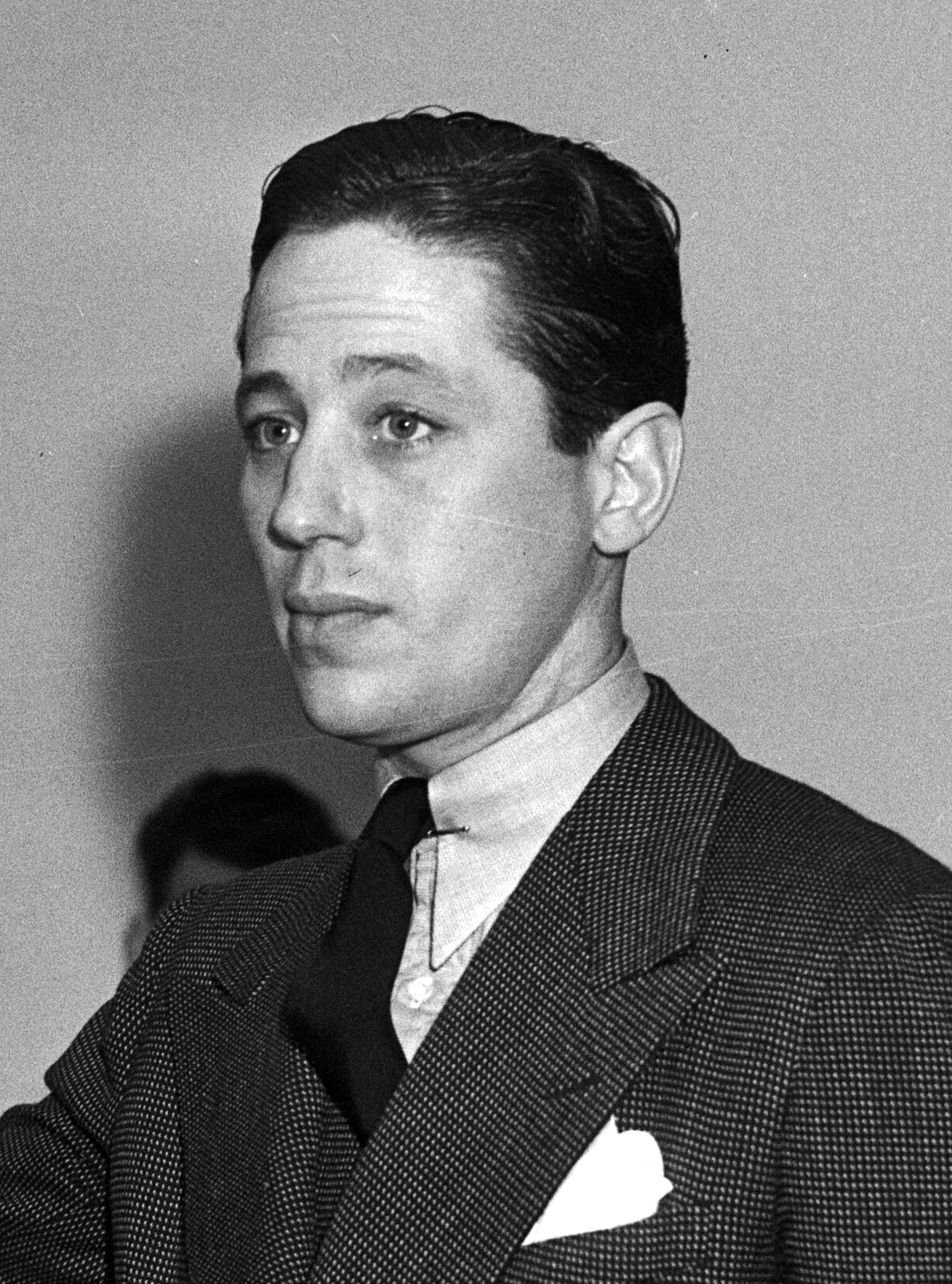
- Alexander in 1935
- Born: Alexander Ross Smith, Jr. July 27, 1907; Brooklyn, New York, U.S.
- Died: January 2, 1937 (aged 29); Los Angeles, California, U.S.
- Occupation: Actor
- Years active: 1924–1937
- Spouses: Aleta Freel (m. 1934; her suicide 1935) Anne Nagel (m. 1936)

Ross Alexander (born Alexander Ross Smith, Jr.; July 27, 1907 – January 2, 1937) was an American stage and film actor.

== Early years ==
Alexander was born Alexander Ross Smith. Jr. in Brooklyn, New York, the son of Maud Adelle (nee Cohen) and Alexander Ross Smith.

Alexander attended Erasmus Hall High School in Brooklyn until he and his family moved to upstate Rochester, New York. He attended high school there, but dropped out before graduating. Alexander claimed in interviews that the high-school principal recommended to his parents that the student should follow the acting profession.

When he was 17, he went to New York City and studied acting at the Packard Theatrical Agency.

== Stage ==
Alexander began his acting career with the Henry Jewett Players in Boston, debuting in Enter Madame. By 1926, he was regarded as a promising leading man with good looks and an easy, charming style, and began appearing in more substantial roles.

His Broadway credits include Enter Madame (1920), The Ladder (1926), Let Us Be Gay (1928), That's Gratitude (1930), After Tomorrow (1931), The Stork Is Dead (1932), Honeymoon (1932), and The Party's Over (1932). Alexander looked back at The Ladder with bemusement because its oilman backer, who had declared that the play would have a record-breaking run, kept his word by keeping the show open—despite audiences of perhaps a dozen people at each performance. Ross Alexander stayed with the ailing show for almost two years.

== Film ==
Alexander was signed to a film contract by Paramount Pictures, and made his film debut in The Wiser Sex (1932). Paramount dropped his option and he returned to Broadway. In 1934, casting director Max Arnow signed him with Warner Bros. His bigger successes from this period were Flirtation Walk (1934), A Midsummer Night's Dream and Captain Blood (both 1935).

In 1936, he starred in Hot Money. It was a defining role in his persona as a glamorous, well-dressed and dapper leading man, not in the usual Warner gangster mold of rough-hewn stars such as Edward G. Robinson or Paul Muni.

His final film Ready, Willing and Able, a Ruby Keeler musical, was released posthumously. Alexander was the male lead, but he was now billed sixth. According to a commentator on the history of American cinema, Kenneth Anger, supposedly Ronald Reagan was signed by Warner Bros. as a replacement for Alexander due to similarities in their radio voices and mannerisms.

== Personal life ==
Alexander married actress Aleta Freel on February 28, 1934, in East Orange, New Jersey. Freel committed suicide on December 7, 1935, shooting herself in the head with a .22 rifle. On September 17, 1936, Alexander married actress Anne Nagel, with whom he had appeared in the films China Clipper and Here Comes Carter (both 1936).

== Death ==
Alexander always had problems with money. According to a studio biography, "He ruefully says that he doesn't know how to save money, and guesses that he'll have to get a business manager. And the only thing he collects is -- not first editions or etchings -- but debts!" By the end of 1936, despite his movie employment, he was deeply in debt. On January 2, 1937, three months after marrying Nagel, with his professional and personal life in disarray, Alexander shot himself in the head with a .22 pistol in the barn behind his home. That was not the same weapon his first wife had used. He is buried in lot 292 of the Sunrise Slope section of Forest Lawn Cemetery in Glendale, California.

== Filmography ==
Year	Title	Role	Notes
1932	The Wiser Sex	Jimmy O'Neill	
1934	Social Register	Lester Trout	
1934	Gentlemen Are Born	Tom Martin	
1934	Flirtation Walk	Oskie	
1935	Maybe It's Love	Rims O'Neil	(starring role)
1935	Going Highbrow	Harley Marsh	
1935	We're in the Money	C. Richard Courtney, aka Carter	
1935	A Midsummer Night's Dream	Demetrius	
1935	Shipmates Forever	Lafayette "Sparks" Brown	
1935	Captain Blood	Jeremy Pitt	
1936	Boulder Dam	Rusty Noonan	(starring role)
1936	Brides Are Like That	Bill McAllister	(starring role)
1936	I Married a Doctor	Erik Valborg	
1936	Hot Money	Chick Randall	(starring role)
1936	China Clipper	Tom Collins	
1936	Here Comes Carter (working title: The Voice of Scandal)	Kent Carter	(starring role)
1937	Ready, Willing and Able	Barry Granville	(starring role, released posthumously)
