= Delmer Daves =

American film director, producer, and screenwriter (1904–1977)

- Born: July 24, 1904; San Francisco, California, U.S.
- Died: August 17, 1977 (aged 73); La Jolla, California, U.S.
- Occupations: Film director, screenwriter, film producer, actor
- Years active: 1928-1965
- Spouse: Mary Lawrence (m. 1938–1977)

Delmer Lawrence Daves (July 24, 1904 – August 17, 1977) was an American screenwriter, film director and film producer. He worked in many genres, including film noir and warfare, but he is best known for his Western movies, especially Broken Arrow (1950), The Last Wagon (1956), 3:10 to Yuma (1957) and The Hanging Tree (1959). He was required to work exclusively on studio-based films after heart trouble in 1959, one of which, A Summer Place (1959), was a huge commercial success.

Daves worked with some of the best known players of his time including established stars like Humphrey Bogart, Gary Cooper, Glenn Ford, James Stewart and Richard Widmark. He also helped to develop the careers of up-and-coming players such as Ernest Borgnine, Charles Bronson, Felicia Farr and George C. Scott.

== Life and career ==
=== College and acting ===
Born in San Francisco, Daves graduated from Stanford University. His first job in the film industry was prop boy on the Western The Covered Wagon (1923), directed by James Cruze, and then served as a technical advisor on a number of other films. He tried his hand at acting and appeared in more than ten movies including The Night Flyer (1928) (produced by Cruze), The Duke Steps Out (1929) and Good News (1930).

=== Screenwriting ===
While he was acting, Daves was given the opportunity by MGM to collaborate on screenplays. He began his career as a screenwriter by contributing to the early sound comedy film So This Is College (MGM; 1929), directed by Sam Wood. Later, working for MGM and other companies, he wrote screenplays for films like Shipmates (MGM; 1931), Dames (Warner Bros; 1934), The Petrified Forest (Warner Bros; 1936), Love Affair (RKO Radio; 1939), and You Were Never Lovelier (Columbia; 1942). Daves was particularly successful with Love Affair which, using his original script, was remade as An Affair to Remember (20th Century Fox; 1957).

=== Direction ===
In 1943, Warner Bros asked Daves to direct Destination Tokyo, a wartime adventure film starring Cary Grant and John Garfield. Daves assisted with the screenplay and this became normal practice for him as a director. He directed three more films during the Second World War – The Very Thought of You (1944), Hollywood Canteen (1944) and Pride of the Marines (1945), all for Warners. The first two of those were light-hearted but the latter, starring John Garfield and Eleanor Parker, studied the difficulties faced by a US marine who had been blinded at the Battle of Guadalcanal. All four of Daves' wartime films were commercially successful. After the war, Daves turned to film noir and made The Red House (1947), starring Edward G. Robinson, for Sol Lesser at United Artists. He returned to Warners where he wrote and directed Dark Passage (1947), starring Humphrey Bogart, Lauren Bacall and Agnes Moorehead. He later directed To the Victor (1948), A Kiss in the Dark (1949) and Task Force (1949). He also wrote the screenplay for Task Force, which starred Gary Cooper.

In February 1949, Daves signed a long-term contract at 20th Century Fox. He began by directing his first Western, the critically acclaimed Broken Arrow (1950) which starred James Stewart, Debra Paget and Jeff Chandler. Chandler played Cochise and the movie's success inspired the making of other films with Native American protagonists. Kim Newman wrote that, by his dignified and heroic performance, Oscar-nominated Chandler established Cochise as "the 1950s model of an Indian hero". Newman points out that the film inspired goodwill to other Native American chiefs such as Sitting Bull, Crazy Horse and Geronimo – as a result, "it became fashionable for Westerns to be pro-Indian". Other scholars warned that these "pro-Indian" movies proposed that peaceful co-existence between Natives and whites was achieved only through the loss of Indian identity. "Good" Indians would conform to white society, "bad" Indians would not.

Daves decided to try other genres with the adventure films Bird of Paradise (1951) and Treasure of the Golden Condor (1953), both of which he wrote and directed. As director only, he made Never Let Me Go (1953) for MGM and Demetrius and the Gladiators (1954) for Fox. Never Let Me Go, starring Clark Gable and Gene Tierney, was shot entirely in England and featured a supporting cast of well-known British actors.

Daves became a freelance director in 1954 and returned to Warners to work on Drum Beat (1954), which he wrote, directed and also co-produced with Alan Ladd, who starred in the movie. One of Ladd's co-stars was Charles Bronson who, then relatively unknown, gave an impressive performance as the Modoc chief Captain Jack. By this time, Daves was fed up of the "pro-Indian" fashion that he had begun, and Drum Beat was "pro-settler" with the hanging of Bronson's character in the final scene "restoring the balance". Aleiss argued that Drum Beat actually preached the same theme in his previous Westerns of good Indians conforming to white expectations while eliminating the bad Indian (Captain Jack). Daves worked primarily on Westerns for the next five years.

After writing the screenplay of White Feather (1955) for Fox, Daves directed three highly rated Westerns: Jubal (1956) for Columbia; The Last Wagon (1956) for Fox; and 3:10 to Yuma (1957) for Columbia. He co-wrote the screenplay for the first two of these; Halsted Welles adapted 3:10 to Yuma from the novel by Elmore Leonard. Felicia Farr had a significant role in all three films. Glenn Ford was the lead actor in Jubal and co-starred with Van Heflin in 3:10 to Yuma. Richard Widmark starred in The Last Wagon. Ernest Borgnine, Charles Bronson and Rod Steiger were all in Jubal; James Drury had a small part in The Last Wagon; Richard Jaeckel and Leora Dana had significant parts in 3:10 to Yuma. According to one review, 3:10 to Yuma was a variation on High Noon (1952) as it "pits a farmer (Heflin) in a battle of wits with a captured killer" (Ford, cast against type as a villain) – it is a "psychological Western" that is generally considered a classic of the genre.

Following Cowboy (1958) which again starred Glenn Ford, this time with Felicia Farr's future husband Jack Lemmon, Daves decided on a switch of genre to direct Kings Go Forth (1958) a World War II drama for United Artists which starred Frank Sinatra, Tony Curtis and Natalie Wood. Daves returned to Westerns towards the end of 1958 when he made The Badlanders (1958) for MGM. This film was in effect a remake of noir classic The Asphalt Jungle (1950), reset in the 1890s. It starred Alan Ladd and Ernest Borgnine.

Daves then made his last Western, The Hanging Tree (1959) starring Gary Cooper, Maria Schell and Karl Malden, with George C. Scott making his debut. This is regarded as another classic and Daves made full use of a stark landscape in which the only real feature was a makeshift gold camp. The power of newly struck gold sends the community into a frenzy and they become, in Newman's words, "a wild collection of riotous scum".

Daves suffered problems with his heart during the making of The Hanging Tree and was forced to step aside for several days; Malden took over as director while Daves was absent. There has been speculation that health problems prevented Daves from continuing to work on Westerns, which were often physically demanding.

=== Later films ===
On medical advice, Daves decided to forgo Westerns and limit himself to studio-bound productions which were less strenuous. He wrote, produced and directed a series of romantic dramas at Warners which all starred Troy Donahue: A Summer Place (1959), Parrish (1961), Susan Slade (1961) and Rome Adventure (1962). A Summer Place was one of his biggest commercial successes. Based on the novel by Sloan Wilson, it was controversial at the time for its treatment of adultery and pre-marital sex.

Daves' final three films were all made at Warners. Spencer's Mountain (1963) starred Henry Fonda and Maureen O'Hara. It was based upon Earl Hamner Jr's autobiographical novel of the same name, and served as the basis for the later television series The Waltons. Daves then wrote, directed and produced Youngblood Hawke (1964) and The Battle of the Villa Fiorita (1965). He retired after Villa Fiorita was released.

Daves was married to actress Mary Lawrence from 1938 until he died on August 17, 1977. He is interred at the Forest Lawn Memorial Park Cemetery in Glendale, California.

== Legacy ==
Kim Newman says of Daves and Anthony Mann that they were able to "ring changes" on seemingly familiar Western storylines by "playing up the psychologically acute reflections of their characters" in relation to the landscape as well as to each other. Daves, he says, achieved this in each of Broken Arrow, The Last Wagon, 3:10 to Yuma, and The Hanging Tree.

Despite several highly acclaimed films, Dave Kehr considers Daves to be an under-rated and neglected filmmaker. As a director, Daves first built his reputation on morally complex war films such as Pride of the Marines and socially progressive Westerns. For example, Broken Arrow has been credited as one of the first to introduce the issue of racism in post-war American movies, and it is widely regarded as one of the first "pro-Native American" films. Kehr views Daves' late period romances as sharing the same virtues as his earlier action films: "characters composed with the utmost integrity and respect; a gift for creating a detailed and convincing social background; and a strong, clear narrative style that allowed him to manage a large cast of characters and several simultaneous levels of dramatic events".

== Filmography ==
Daves began his career as filmmaker in 1943, following a career working as an actor and scriptwriter. He is credited with making 30 films between 1943 and 1965, his most acclaimed being the 1957 film 3:10 to Yuma.

- Destination Tokyo (1943; also writer)
- The Very Thought of You (1944; also writer)
- Hollywood Canteen (1944; also writer)
- Pride of the Marines (1945)
- The Red House (1947; also writer)
- Dark Passage (1947; also writer)
- To the Victor (1948)
- Task Force (1949; also writer)
- A Kiss in the Dark (1949)
- Broken Arrow (1950)
- Bird of Paradise (1951; also writer and producer)
- Return of the Texan (1952)
- Treasure of the Golden Condor (1953; also writer)
- Never Let Me Go (1953)
- Drum Beat (1954; also writer and producer)
- Demetrius and the Gladiators (1954)
- The Last Wagon (1956; also writer)
- Jubal (1956; also writer)
- 3:10 to Yuma (1957)
- Cowboy (1958)
- Kings Go Forth (1958)
- The Badlanders (1958)
- The Hanging Tree (1959)
- A Summer Place (1959; also writer and producer)
- Parrish (1961; also writer and producer)
- Susan Slade (1961; also writer)
- Rome Adventure (1962; also writer and producer)
- Spencer's Mountain (1963; also writer and producer)
- Youngblood Hawke (1964; also writer and producer)
- The Battle of the Villa Fiorita (1965; also writer and producer)

=== Other work ===
As actor

- The Duke Steps Out (1929; actor)
- The Bishop Murder Case (1929; actor – as Raymond Sperling)

As writer

- So This Is College (1929; writer)
- Shipmates (1931; adaptation and dialogue)
- Divorce in the Family (1932)
- No More Women (1934; co-writer with John Mikale Strong, Grant Leenhouts, Lou Breslow)
- Dames (1934; writer)
- Stranded (1935; co-writer with Carl Erickson)
- Flirtation Walk (1934; writer)
- Shipmates Forever (1935)
- Page Miss Glory (1935; writer)
- The Petrified Forest (1936; adaptation)
- The Go Getter (1937; writer)
- Professor Beware (1938; screenplay)
- Love Affair (1939; writer)
- Night of January 16th (1941; co-writer with Robert Pirosh)
- You Were Never Lovelier (1942; writer)
- Stage Door Canteen (1943; writer)
- White Feather (1955; writer)
- An Affair to Remember (1957; writer)

== Bibliography ==
- Nelson, Andrew Patrick; Carter, Matthew (2016). ReFocus: The Films of Delmer Daves. Edinburgh: Edinburgh University Press. ISBN 978-1474403016.
- Newman, Kim (1990). Wild West Movies. London: Bloomsbury Publishing Ltd. ISBN 978-07-47507-47-5.
