= Brides Are Like That =

1936 film by William C. McGann

- Directed by: William C. McGann
- Screenplay by: Ben Markson; Barry Conners (play)
- Produced by: Bryan Foy
- Starring: Ross Alexander; Anita Louise; Joseph Cawthorn; Kathleen Lockhart; Gene Lockhart; Dick Purcell
- Cinematography: Sidney Hickox
- Edited by: Clarence Kolster
- Music by: Heinz Roemheld
- Production company: First National Pictures
- Distributed by: Warner Bros. Pictures
- Release date: April 18, 1936
- Running time: 67 minutes
- Country: United States
- Language: English

Brides Are Like That is a 1936 American comedy film directed by William C. McGann and written by Ben Markson. The film stars Ross Alexander, Anita Louise, Joseph Cawthorn, Kathleen Lockhart, Gene Lockhart and Dick Purcell. The film was released by Warner Bros. Pictures on April 18, 1936.

== Plot ==
Bill McAllister is a quick talking nephew of a rich uncle who has a shipping business, and to which he lives off of as a young man by charging most of his expenses ....he only has a single dollar saved in his sleeve.

Bill meets and falls for a young lady named Hazel who is the daughter of a large apple baron...and although Hazel thinks she is in love with a Dr. Jenkins, Bill convinces Dr. Jenkins that he really doesn't want to get married and then woos Hazel into falling in love with himself. Bill is a very fast talking, quick thinking person who uses flattery to impress people and get them to agree to his ideas....or at least stall off his creditors and detractors from talking action against him.

When Hazel's rich father tries to talk her out of marrying Bill, Bill fast-talks his soon-to-be father-in-law and assures him that he can take care of their daughter...and although the father does not want them to marry, Bill and Hazel elope and set up housekeeping in an apartment even though Bill does not have a job...

Hazel's father arranges for Bill to get job using Bill's car to perform exterminating work...and Hazel assures her dad that Bill will take the job and prove he is capable of holding a job or she will leave Bill and return to her parents' home. When Bill returns to their apartment that same evening, he assures his wife that he has paid his past due rents by selling his car and buying a tent so that they can go on an extended camping trip as a honeymoon.

Hazel is distraught that he has sold their car to pay their back rent and therefore will not be able to take the new job when both Bill's uncle and Hazel's parents show up at their apartment. Bill's uncle is there to demand that Bill pay all the charges he has been charging to his uncle, and Hazel's parents are there to make sure Bill agrees to take the new job they have arranged.

After some fast talking, Bill agrees to take the job, but tells both his uncle who ships apples and Hazel's father who is an apple baron that he has invented a new way to ship apples using a special type of packing which will keep the apples fresh and undamaged longer. Bill's idea is a great hit and makes both men happy and the film ends with Bill and Hazel happily in love, with both her parents and his uncle all pleased with Bill and the marriage.

== Cast ==
- Ross Alexander as Bill McAllister
- Anita Louise as Hazel Robinson
- Joseph Cawthorn as Fred Schultz
- Kathleen Lockhart as Mrs. Ella Robinson
- Gene Lockhart as John Robinson
- Dick Purcell as Dr. Randolph Jenkins
- Mary Treen as Jennie
- Joseph Crehan as Tom Carter
- Frank Darien as Clem Brown
- Robert Emmett Keane as Jones
- Kay Hughes as Mary Ann Coleridge

== Reception ==
Frank Nugent of The New York Times reviewed the film positively, praising the performances of the cast, and its adaptation of the Broadway play "Applesauce" by Barry Conners as avoiding common adaptation pitfalls.
