= Flirtation Walk (West Point) =

Foot trail in New York state, US

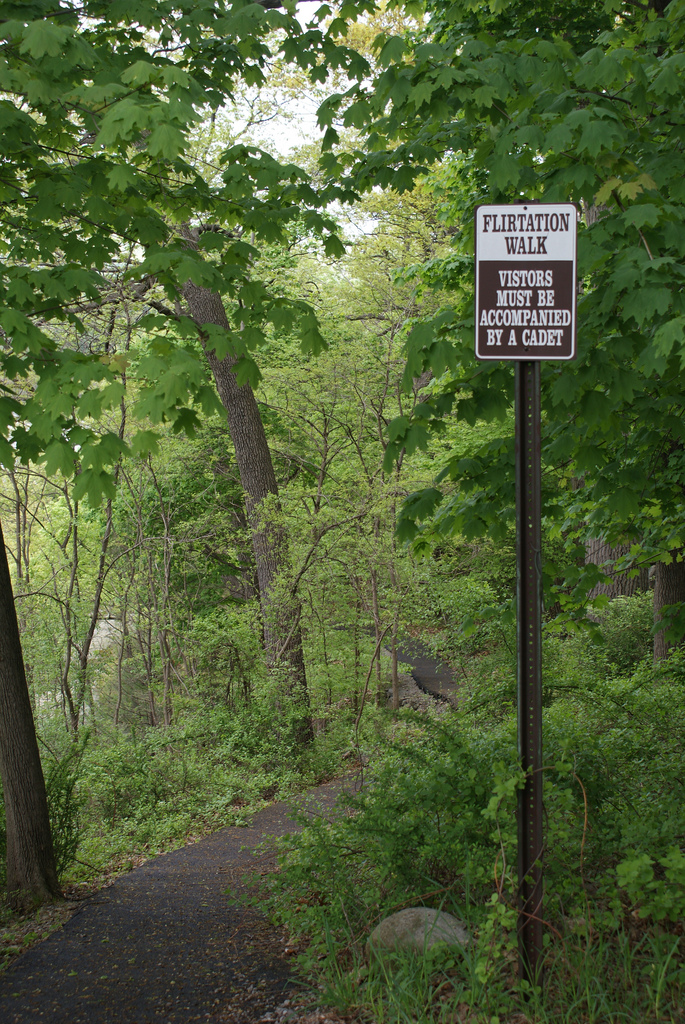
Trailhead at Trophy Point

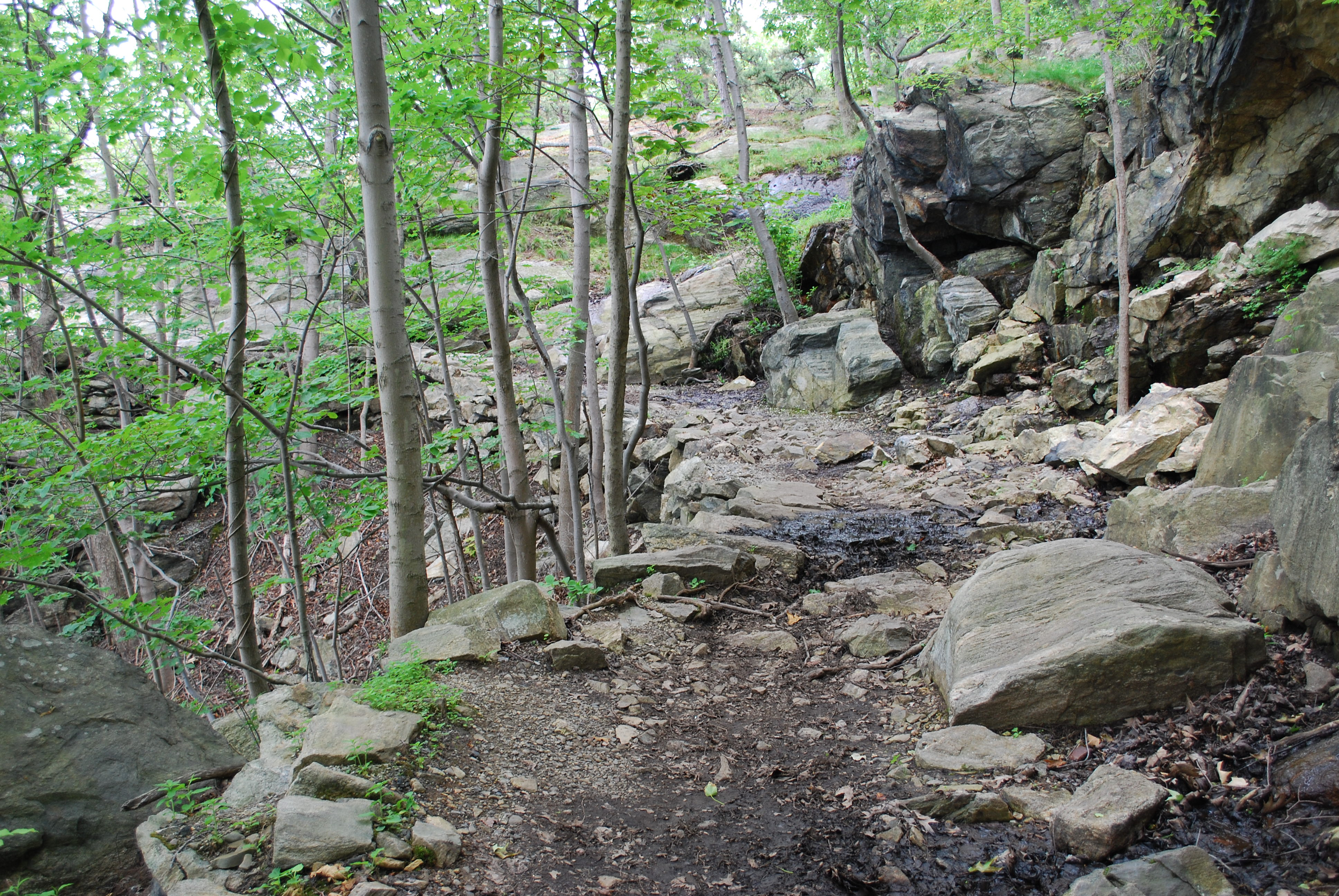
Broken terrain on the trail

Flirtation Walk is a historic rocky foot trail at the United States Military Academy. The trail follows the shoreline of the Hudson River along the western bank. The southern trailhead starts at the edge of the Lincoln Hall parking lot and winds north along the river around Gee's Point and the West Point Light. The trail turns west-northwest, passing Battery Cove, where the Great Chain was anchored during the Revolutionary War. The trail ends near the helipad of West Point's North Dock. There also is an access trail that descends steeply to the river level from Trophy Point. The trail varies in consistency from level and even to steep and rocky. By academy tradition, only cadets and their guests may use the trail. Visitors escorted by cadets should wear sturdy shoes. The 1934 film Flirtation Walk was named after the trail. The film was nominated for the Academy Award for Best Picture.

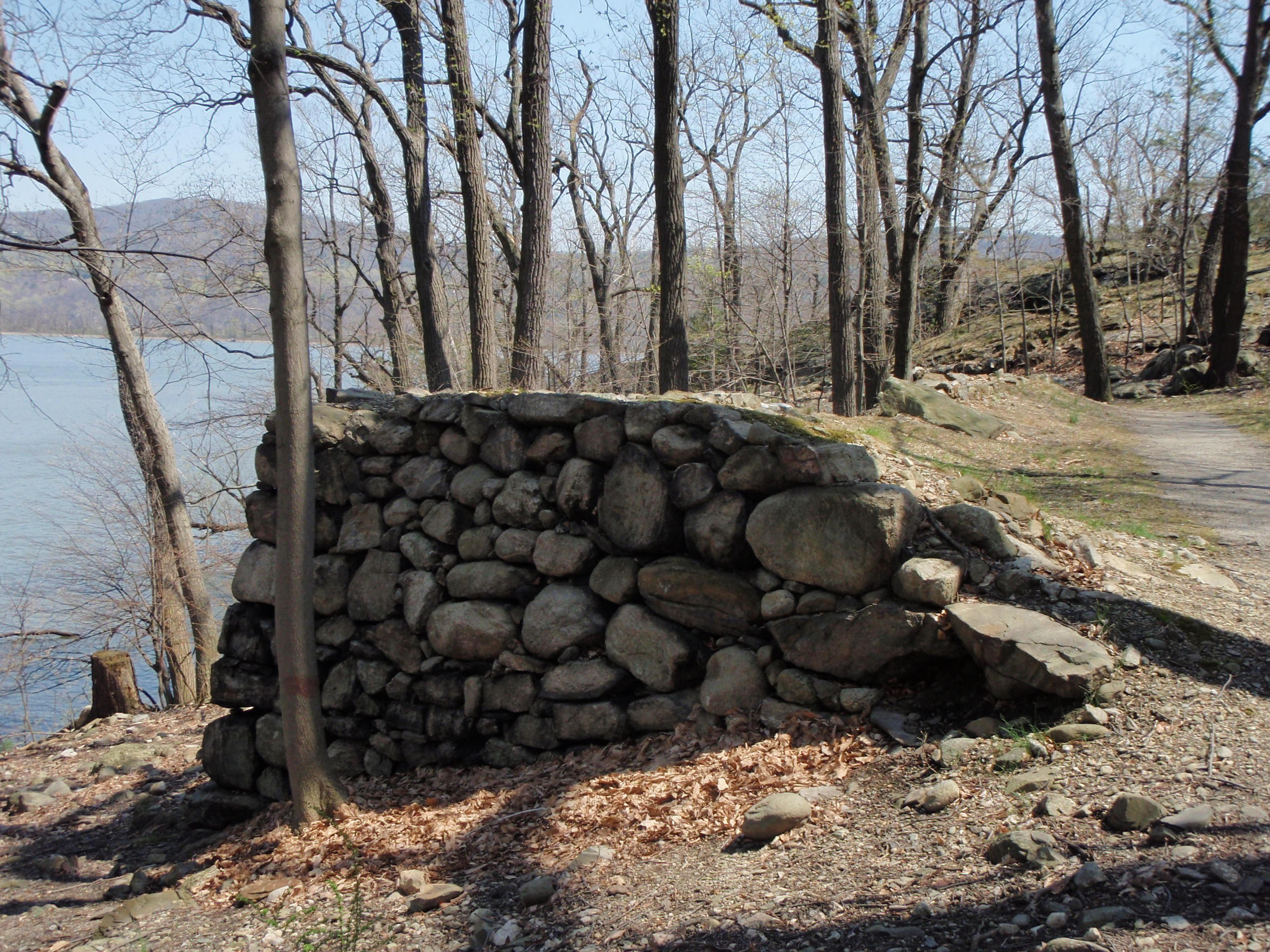
Stoneworks in Battery Cove

Cadets refer to it as "Flirtie Walk", or just "Flirtie". The cadet knowledge manual, known as Bugle Notes, refers to Flirtation Walk as a "scenic walk where only cadets and their escorts may go." The trail was first used during the Revolutionary War to access the Great Chain that deterred British ships navigating the turn in the river. As it originally had a military application, this path was off limits to cadets until the 1840s. After the military garrison's purpose at West Point became obsolete, the trail was opened and encouraged to be used by cadets. As the academy grew in size in the mid-19th century, more visitors began to frequent the cadets. Given the limited transportation opportunities of the day and the lack of places for the young men of the academy to take their lady guests, the walk became a popular place to go. The administration of the academy allowed cadets the rare opportunity to have some privacy with their guests. This policy is still traditionally held and signs are posted to keep visitors to the academy away from the trail. The signs read "Visitors must be accompanied by a cadet".

== Monuments to former cadets ==
Because of the sentimental place in the hearts of cadets, and perhaps because of the relative amount of space available compared to the rest of the academy's grounds, Flirtation walk is home to several memorials to former cadets. Most are dedicated to cadets who died during their time at the academy. The largest and most prominent monument along the trail is Sheridan Memorial near Gee's Point that is dedicated to Richard B. Sheridan Jr, who died on the gridiron of the Yale Bowl in October 1931.

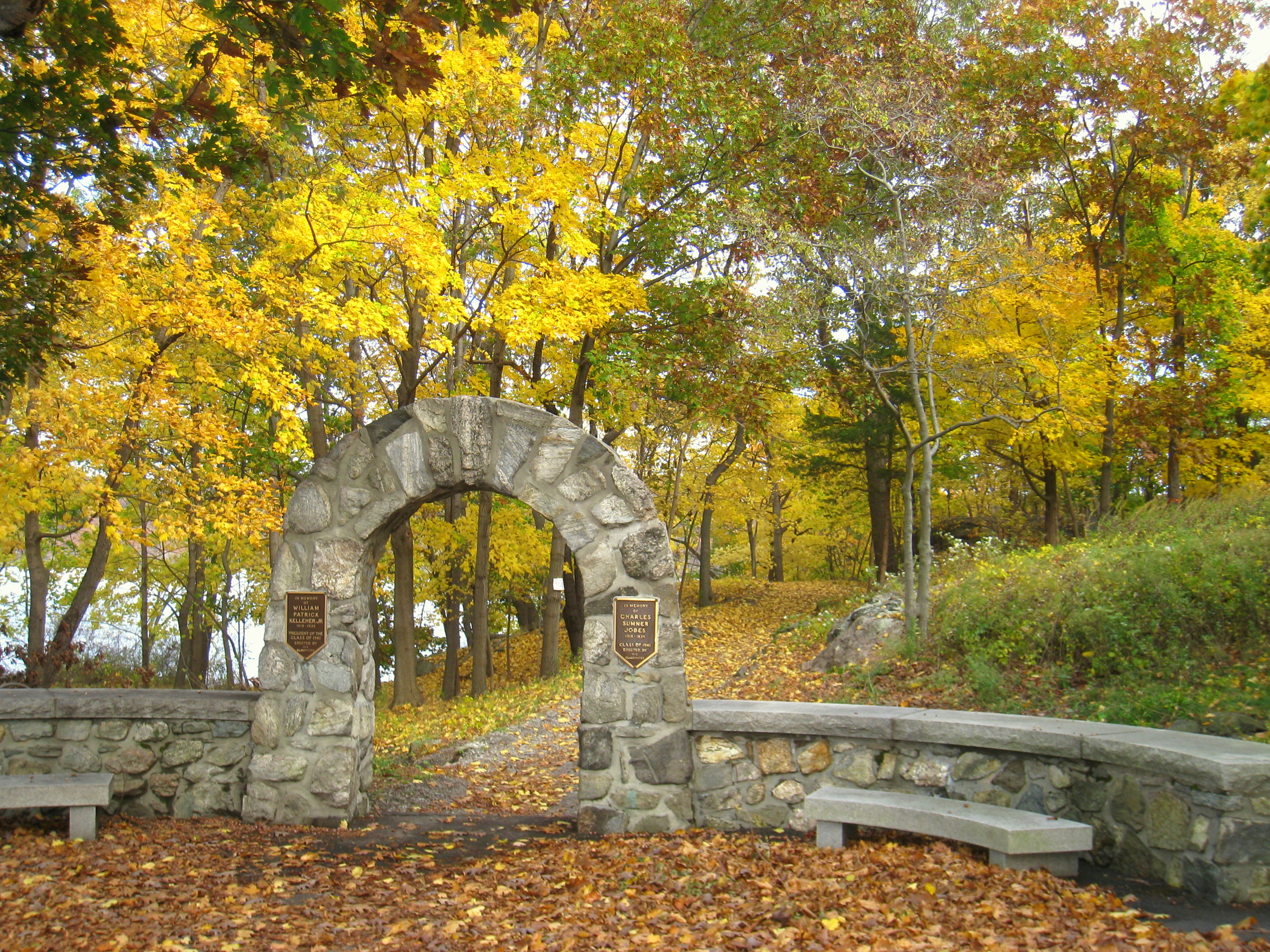
Kelleher-Jobes memorial arch at the north trailhead

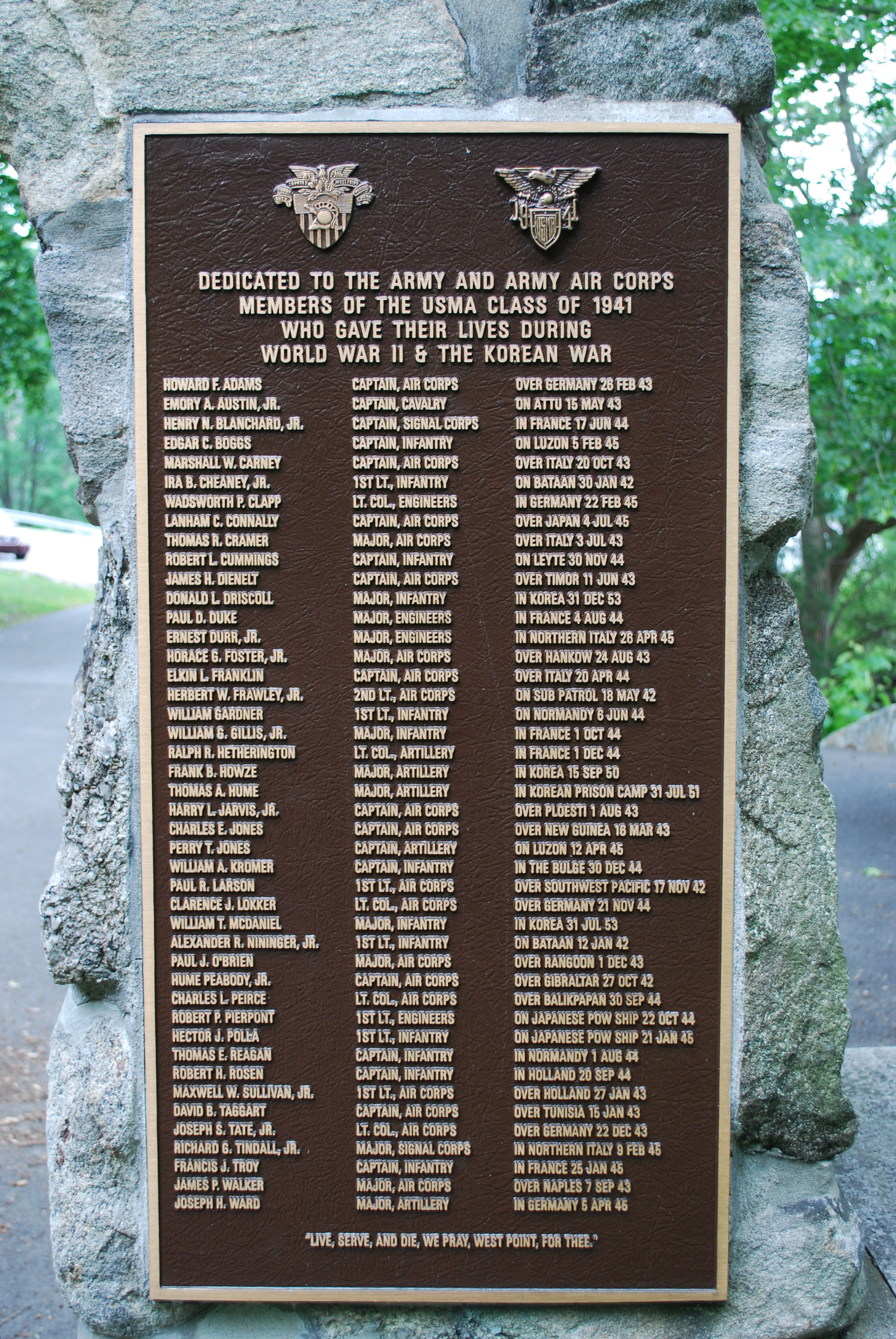
Memorial plate to class of 1941 on the back side of the Kelleher-Jobes arch

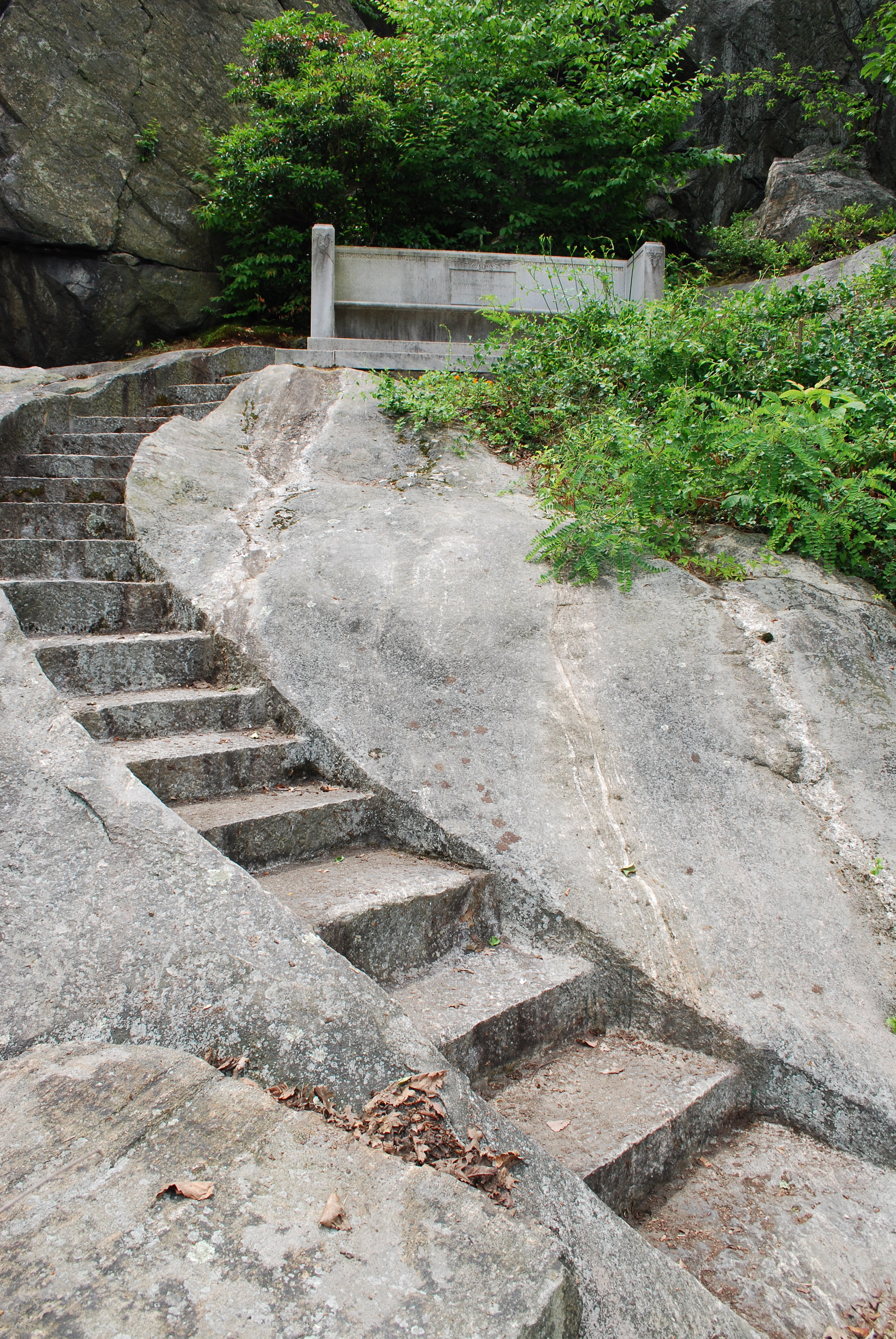
Sheridan Memorial near Gee's Point

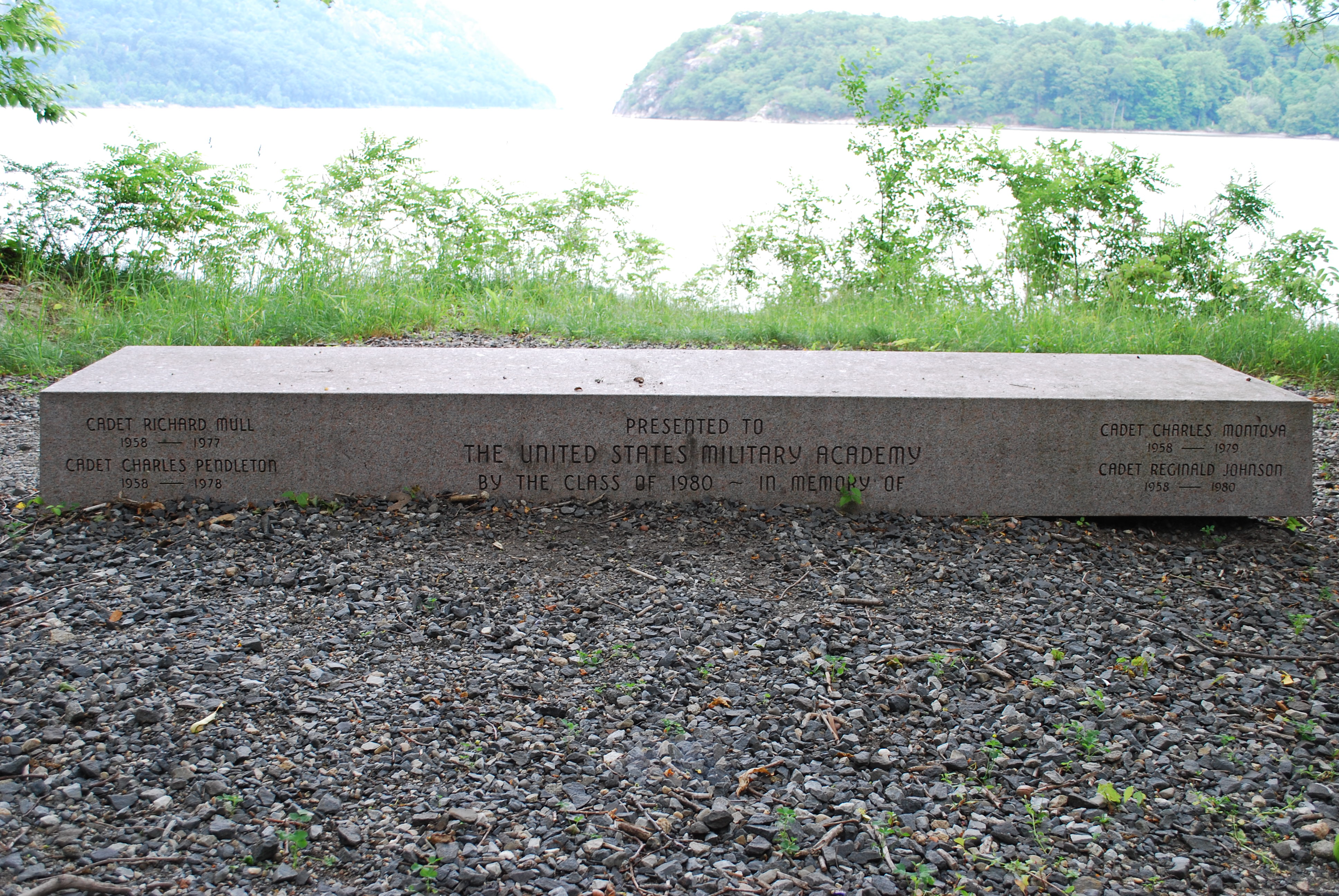
Class of 1980 Memorial bench near the north trailhead

== Battle memorial engravings ==
Because the Mexican War was the first war where West Point graduates played a commanding role, several of its major battles are commemorated on Flirtie Walk. There is a large engraving that states "MEXICO 13,14 SEP 1847" along Howard Road leading down to North Dock. There is also a large engraving commemorating the Battle of Saratoga on the cliffside at Kosciuszko's Garden about a quarter mile south of Flirtie Walk.

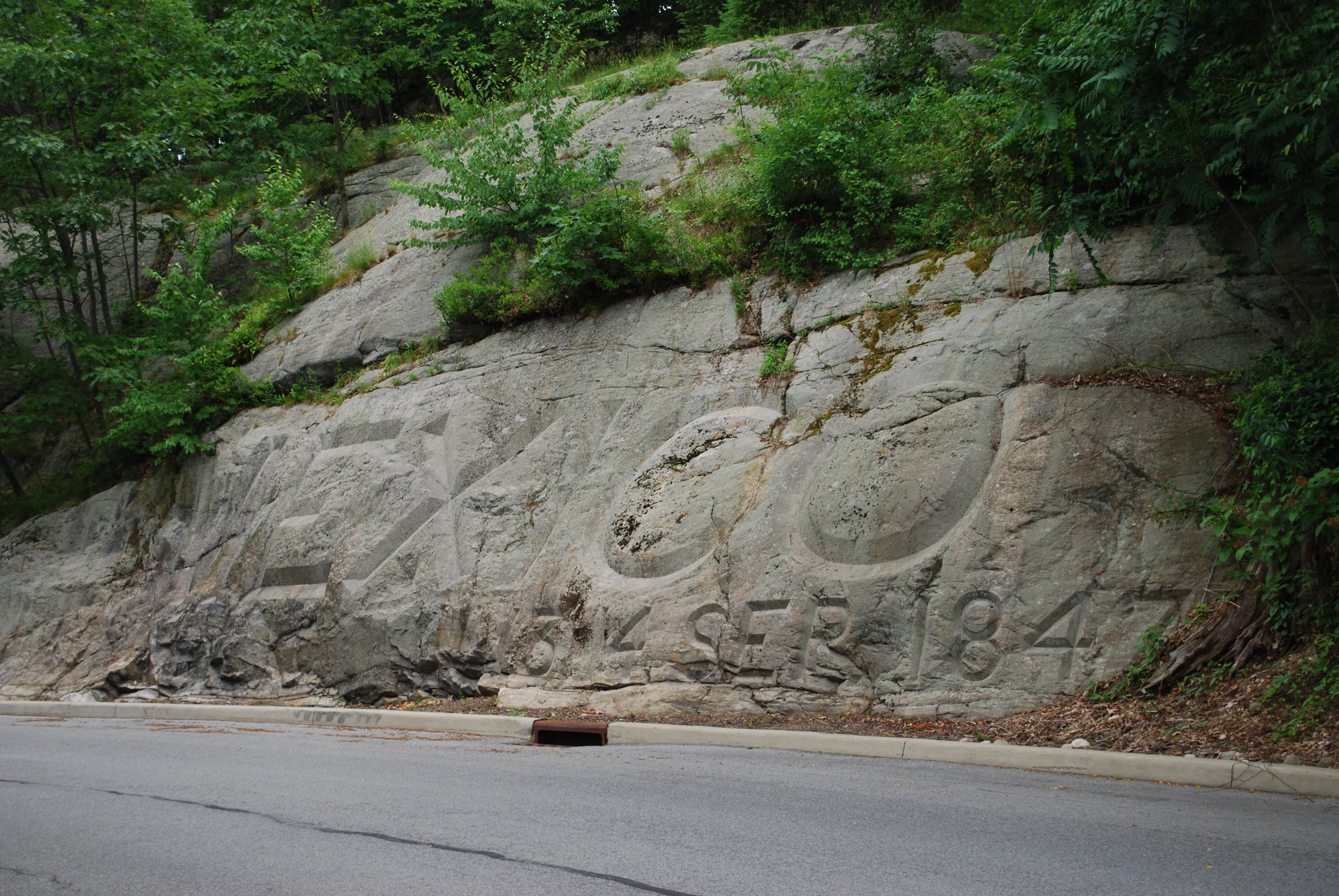
Mexican War engraving off of Howard Road

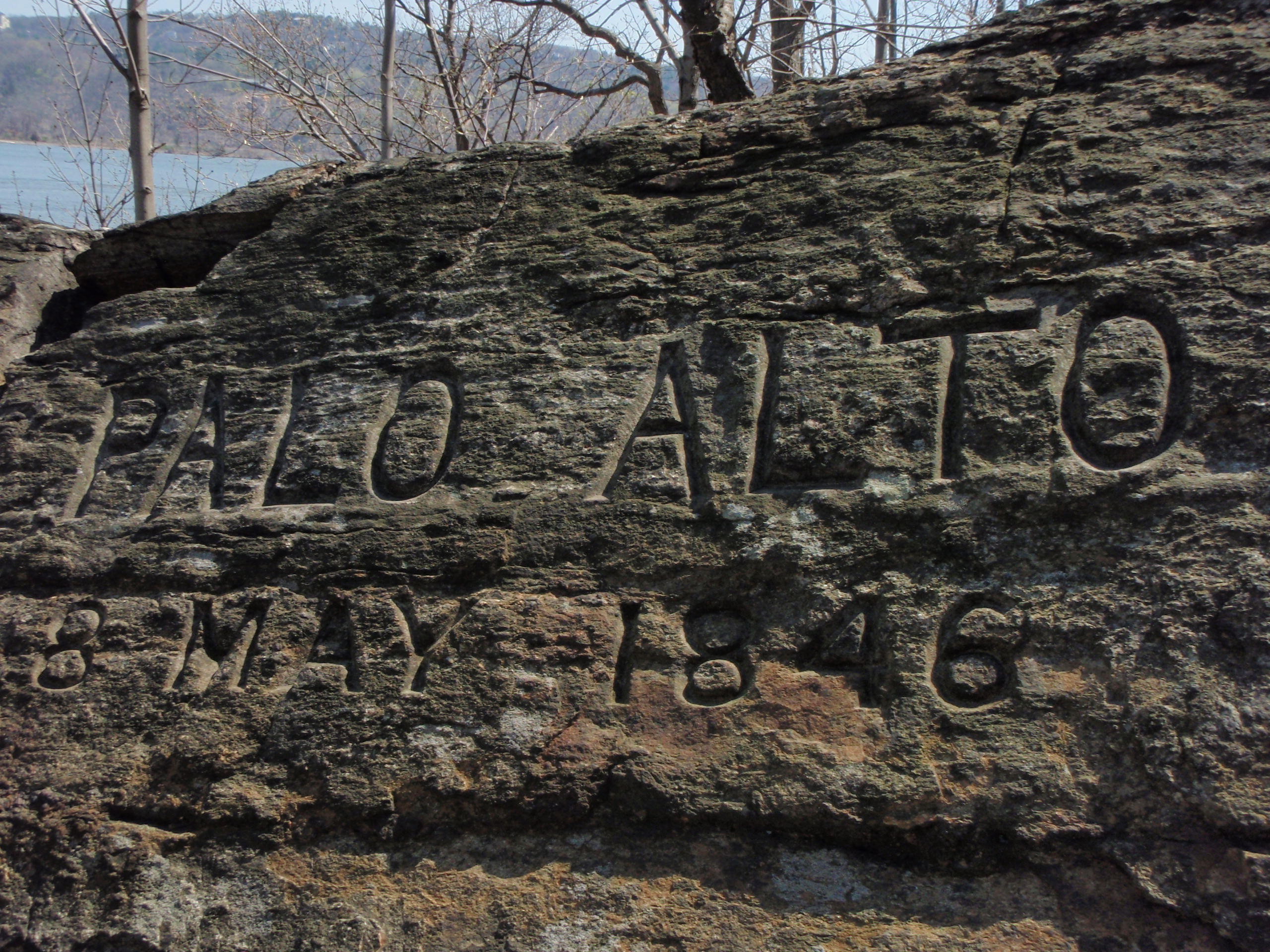
Palo Alto engraving near Gee's Point

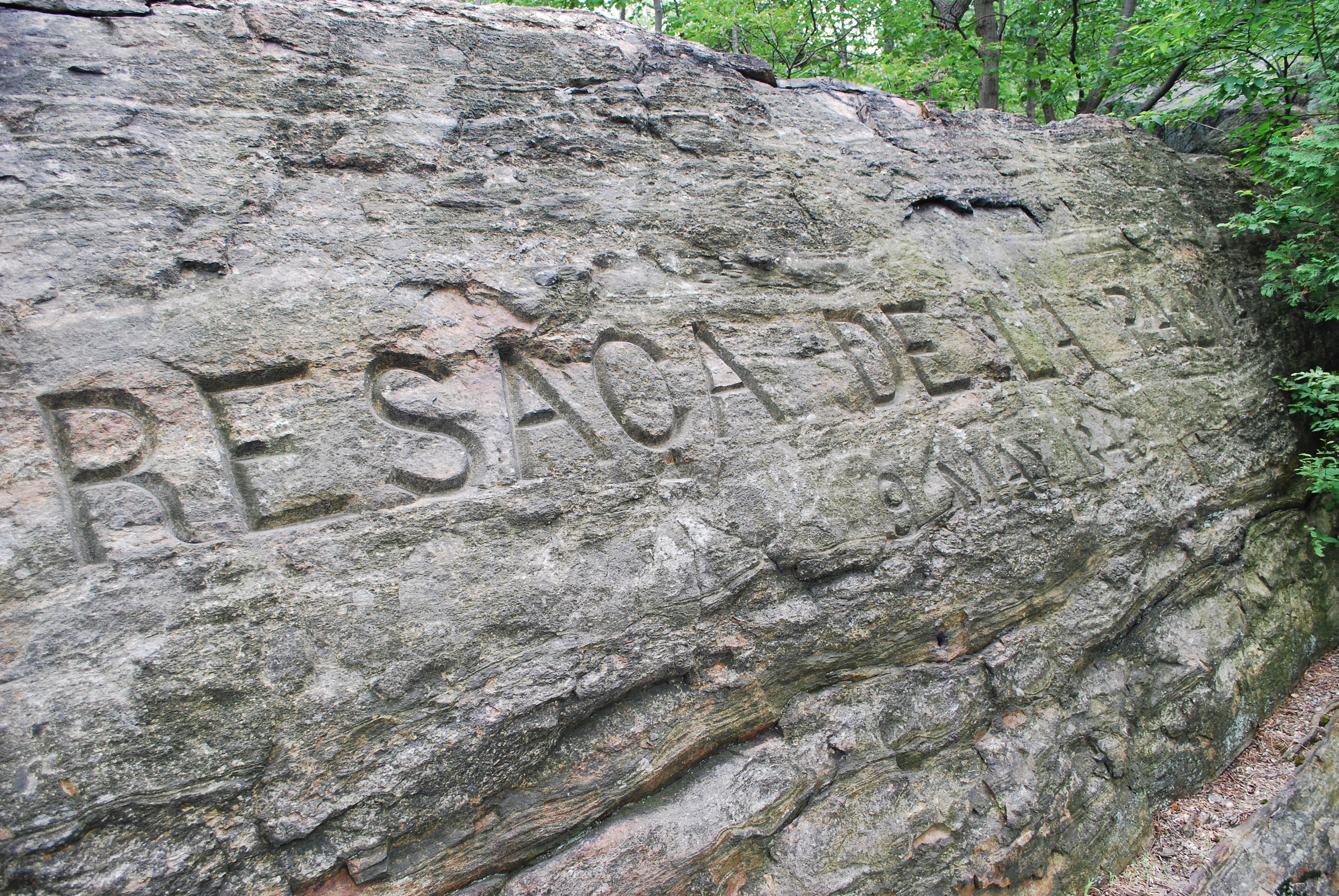
Resaca De La Palma engraving which is adjacent the Palo Alto engraving

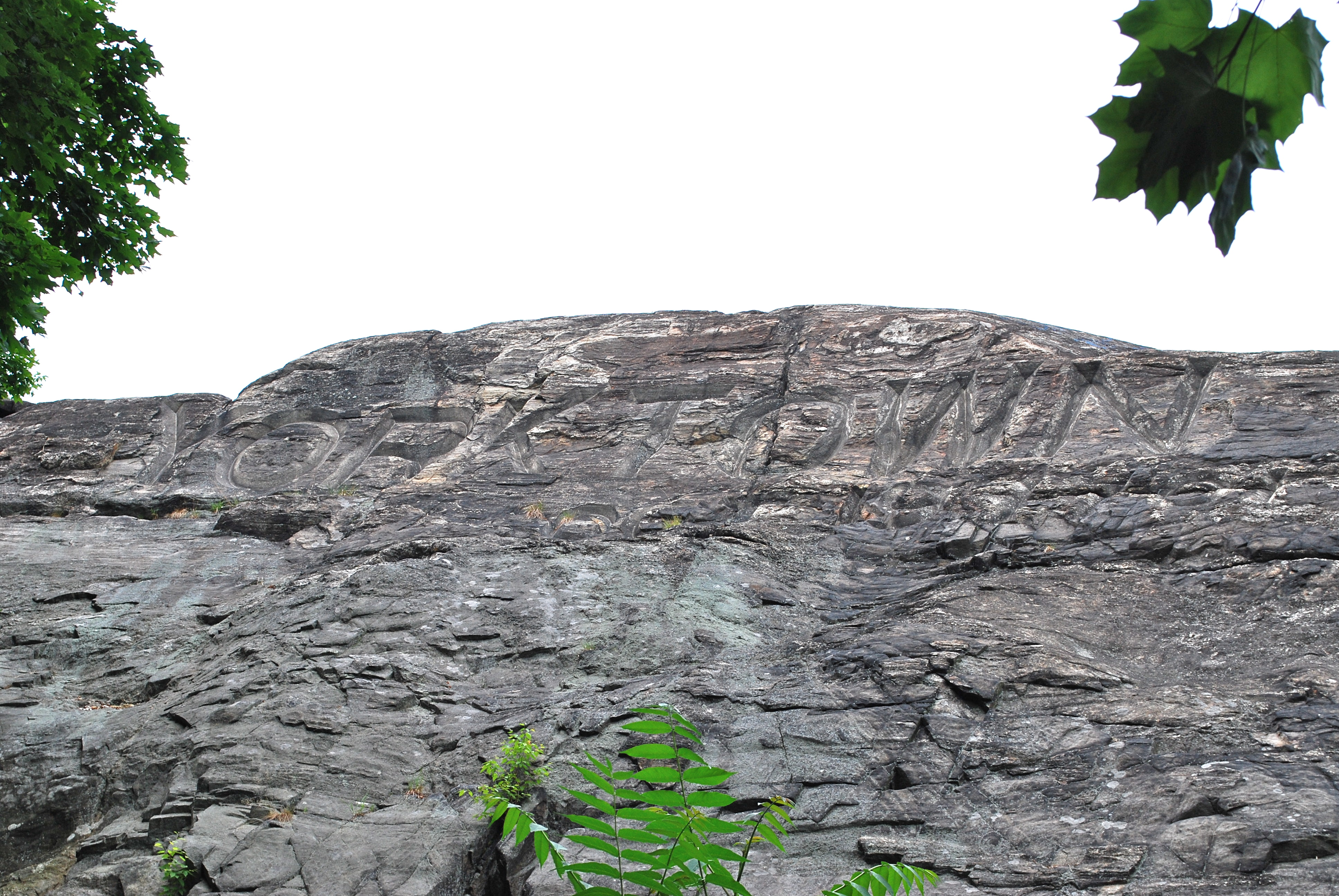
Yorktown engraving which sits high above the Sheridan Memorial just to the south

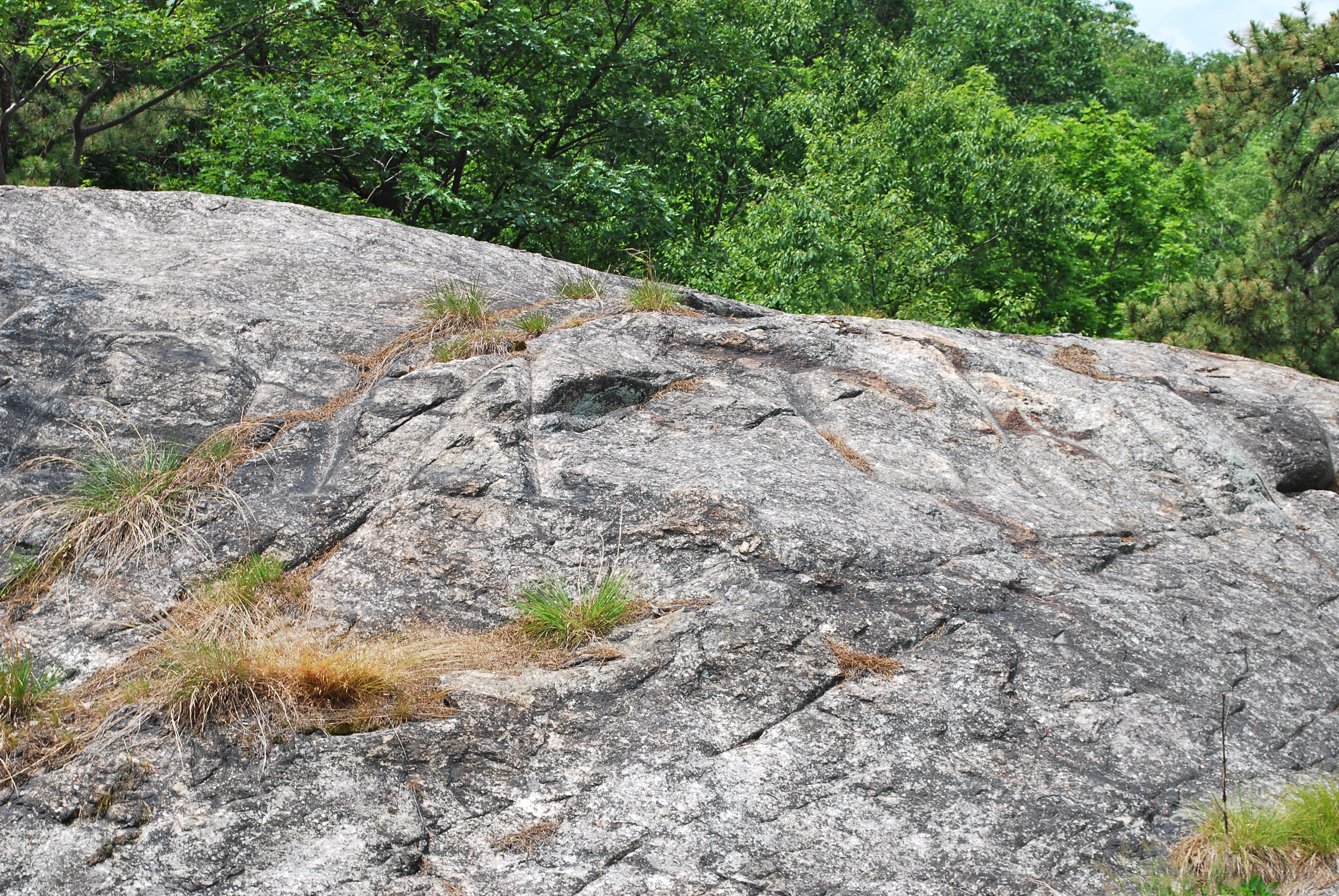
Veracruz engraving. The more horizontal and exposed orientation of the lettering has led to significant weather erosion. The engraving is towards the north end of the trail.

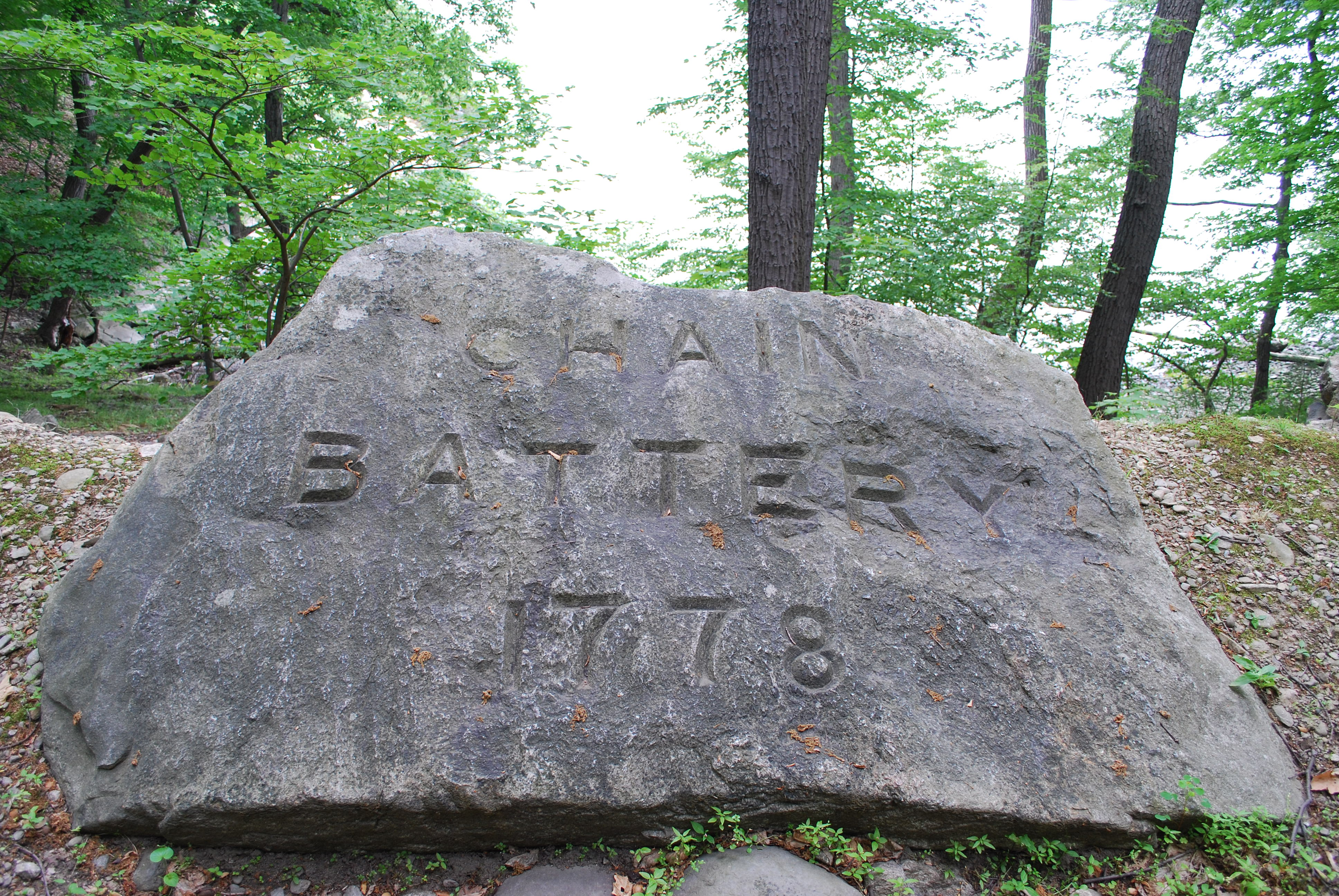
Location of the supporting artillery battery for the Great Chain during the Revolutionary War.
