= Lady in a Jam =

1942 film by Gregory La Cava

- Directed by: Gregory La Cava
- Written by: Eugene Thackrey; Francis M. Cockrell; Otho Lovering
- Produced by: Gregory La Cava
- Starring: Irene Dunne; Patric Knowles; Ralph Bellamy
- Cinematography: Hal Mohr
- Edited by: Russell F. Schoengarth
- Music by: Frank Skinner
- Production company: Universal Pictures
- Distributed by: Universal Pictures
- Release date: June 19, 1942
- Running time: 78 minutes
- Country: United States
- Language: English

Lady in a Jam is a 1942 film comedy directed by Gregory La Cava and starring Irene Dunne, Patric Knowles, Ralph Bellamy, and Eugene Pallette. It was made and distributed by Universal Pictures. The film's sets were designed by the art director Jack Otterson.

The film's alternate title is The Sheltered Side. A copy is preserved in the Library of Congress collection.

== Plot ==
Jane Palmer's reckless spending and behavior concern her guardian Billingsley so much that he goes to a New York City clinic to seek psychiatric help for her. Dr. Enright, taking the case, sees how Jane refuses to even acknowledge that she has squandered her entire inheritance, and that her remaining possessions are being auctioned off.

Enright believes they need to trace the root of her problems, and accompanies Jane on a cross-country trip to her Arizona childhood home. "Cactus" Kate, her grandmother, is leery of Jane being in need of money, while childhood sweetheart Stanley Gardner deludes himself into thinking Jane has returned home just for him.

Jane begins prospecting for gold at her grandfather's mine. Seeing her growing romantic interest in the doctor, Stanley foolishly challenges him to an old-fashioned duel of pistols until he discovers Enright is a crack shot. Cactus Kate plants precious ore so that Jane can find it, inadvertently causing a gold rush by prospectors galore. Enright has seen enough craziness, and returns home, but Jane tracks him back to New York and declares that they were meant for each other.

== Cast ==
- Irene Dunne as Jane Palmer
- Ralph Bellamy as Stanley
- Patric Knowles as Dr. Enright
- Eugene Pallette as Billingsley
- Samuel S. Hinds as Dr. Brewster
- Queenie Vassar as Cactus Kate
- Jane Garland as Strawberry
- Edward McWade as Ground-Hog
- Robert Homans as Faro Bill
- Russell Hicks as Carter
- Hardie Albright as Milton
- Isabel La Mal as Josephine
- Edward Gargan as Deputy
- Mona Barrie as Woman
- Irving Bacon as Motel Proprietor
