= Peaceful Oscar =

1927 film

- Directed by: Fatty Arbuckle (as William Goodrich)
- Starring: Lloyd Hamilton
- Release date: January 30, 1927
- Running time: 25 minutes
- Country: United States
- Languages: Silent; English intertitles

Peaceful Oscar is a 1927 American comedy film directed by Fatty Arbuckle.

== Cast ==
- Lloyd Hamilton
- Toy Gallagher
- Henry Murdoch
- Blanche Payson
- Billy Hampton

== See also ==
- Fatty Arbuckle filmography
