= Page Miss Glory (1935 film) =

1935 film by Mervyn LeRoy

- Directed by: Mervyn LeRoy
- Written by: Delmer Daves; Robert Lord
- Based on: Page Miss Glory; 1934 play by Joseph Schrank; Phillip Dunning
- Produced by: Marion Davies (uncredited)
- Starring: Marion Davies; Pat O'Brien; Dick Powell
- Cinematography: George J. Folsey
- Edited by: William Clemens
- Music by: Harry Warren, Al Dubin
- Production company: Cosmopolitan Productions
- Distributed by: Warner Bros. Pictures
- Release date: September 7, 1935
- Running time: 93 minutes
- Country: United States
- Language: English

Page Miss Glory is a 1935 American romantic comedy film directed by Mervyn LeRoy and starring Marion Davies, Pat O'Brien, and Dick Powell. It was based on the play of the same name by Joseph Schrank and Philip Dunning.

== Plot ==
Country girl Loretta Dalrymple arrives in New York City and gets a job as a chambermaid in a luxurious hotel, the same hotel in which con man "Click" Wiley and his photographer partner Ed Olsen are four weeks in arrears. Desperate to avoid being evicted by the assistant manager, Mr. Yates, Click has Ed make a composite photograph by combining the best features of several renowned Hollywood beauties and enters the resulting fake under the name "Dawn Glory" in a nationwide beauty contest for the $2500 prize. Dawn Glory wins.

Bingo Nelson, a pilot famous for performing crazy stunts, immediately falls in love when he spots the photograph in his friend Click's suite. After heroically flying to Alaska through a blizzard to deliver serum for some sick children, he proposes to Dawn Glory on national radio. As a result, reporters clamor to interview the woman, putting Click in a tough spot. Slattery of the Express is particularly persistent, digging up Click's checkered past to try to blackmail him into giving him an exclusive interview. Finally, Click is about to admit the truth when Ed's girlfriend Gladys Russell discovers Loretta trying on a dress delivered for Miss Glory. Earlier in the day, Loretta had splurged and gotten her hair styled as in the photograph. Gladys and Ed pass off Loretta as Dawn. Soon, advertising endorsements and royalties make Click and Ed a lot of money.

Simeon Hamburgher, president of Nemo Yeast, the beauty contest's sponsor, hires Bingo to fly over the city and tout Miss Glory's endorsement of his product over a loudspeaker. His bitter rival, J. Horace Freischutz, orders his assistant Joe Bonner to arrange a meeting somehow with Dawn, so he can try to persuade her to sign with him. Bonner pays thugs Petey and Blackie to kidnap her. After Petey learns that Dawn is really an impostor, he and his partner decide to blackmail Click instead. Click agrees to pay them off if they will kidnap Bingo, a persistent nuisance who keeps trying to talk to Dawn. Gladys, jealous of a possible rival for Ed's affections, suggests they take Dawn instead. Petey is dazzled by Dawn's beauty, so he does. However, Bingo tracks them down and rescues her. She agrees to marry him and announces it to everyone from the skies over New York.

== Cast ==
- Marion Davies as Loretta Dalrymple / "Dawn Glory"
- Pat O'Brien as Daniel "Click" Wiley
- Dick Powell as Bingo Nelson
- Mary Astor as Gladys Russell
- Frank McHugh as Edward Olson
- Lyle Talbot as Slattery
- Allen Jenkins as Petey
- Barton MacLane as Blackie (as Barton McLane)
- Patsy Kelly as Betty, a chambermaid and Loretta's friend
- Hobart Cavanaugh as Joe Bonner
- Joseph Cawthorn as J. Horace Freischutz
- Al Shean as Simeon Hamburgher
- Berton Churchill as Mr. Yates

== Legacy ==
Warner Bros. followed the film in 1936 with the Merrie Melodies cartoon Miss Glory. The film's title song, written by Harry Warren and Al Dubin and performed in the movie by Dick Powell, features prominently in the cartoon. Though the cartoon, like the film, is set in a large hotel, the plot is completely different.

The 1949 comedy movie The Girl from Jones Beach is also about a "composite" beauty. Ronald Reagan plays a cheesecake artist who paints his greatest creation using 12 models who are unknown to each other. Then he stumbles across a woman (played by Virginia Mayo) who's the perfect likeness of the woman in the picture. In 2002, two separate films used premises from "Page Miss Glory". New Line Cinema released S1m0ne, which tells the story of a man who makes a composite image of a gorgeous woman by combining the best features of several renowned Hollywood beauties - and is then faced with the challenge of producing the real woman; and Sony Pictures released Maid in Manhattan, which tells the story of a luxury hotel maid who is mistaken for a wealthy hotel guest after seen wearing an article of clothing meant for someone else. John Hughes' original script title for Maid in Manhattan was "The Chambermaid."

None of these films credit Joseph Schrank, Phillip Dunning, Delmer Daves or Robert Lord with the story.
