= Shipmates Forever =

1935 film by Frank Borzage

- Theatrical release poster
- Directed by: Frank Borzage
- Screenplay by: Delmer Daves
- Story by: Delmer Daves
- Produced by: Frank Borzage
- Starring: Dick Powell; Ruby Keeler; Lewis Stone; Ross Alexander; Eddie Acuff; Dick Foran
- Cinematography: Sol Polito
- Edited by: William Holmes
- Music by: Bernhard Kaun
- Production companies: First National Pictures; Cosmopolitan Productions
- Distributed by: Warner Bros. Pictures
- Release date: October 12, 1935
- Running time: 109 minutes
- Country: United States
- Language: English

Shipmates Forever is a 1935 American musical film directed by Frank Borzage and written by Delmer Daves. Set at the United States Naval Academy, the film stars Dick Powell, Ruby Keeler, Lewis Stone, Ross Alexander, John Arledge, Eddie Acuff, and Dick Foran. The film was released by Warner Bros. Pictures on October 12, 1935.

Powell, Keeler, Alexander and Arledge combined previously with Borzage and Daves under similar circumstances of plot and character in Flirtation Walk, a film about the United States Military Academy, the year before.

The U.S. Navy provided technical assistance for the filming. Locations shots were made at the Naval Academy and a portion of the story's "final cruise" included footage of the battleship USS Arkansas (BB-33), which conducted midshipmen cruises for the Navy in the 1930s. Rare footage of the Martin P3M flying boat is also featured.

== Plot ==
Dick Melville and June Blackburn meet during a naval review in New York Harbor. Though both come from Navy families, Dick pursues a singing career and June, her father and brother both having been killed in the war, has vowed never to marry a Navy man. Admiral Melville, Dick's father, is the new superintendent of the Naval Academy and his dearest wish is that his son follow in his footsteps as a naval officer. He maneuvers Dick into enrolling as a midshipman by accusing him of being afraid of failing the entrance exams.

Though with no intent of accepting a commission, Dick passes the tests, however he finds he cannot turn down the appointment because it would disappoint his father. Dick's roommates are "Sparks" Brown, a radio operator from the South; "Coxswain" Lawrence, a sailor appointed from the fleet; and "Cowboy" Lincoln, from the West. All of the plebes receive hazing from the upperclassmen, but Dick is a special target of teasing because of his father and his fame as a singer.

Dick hates the academy and decides to leave until June encourages him to finish what he started. Academically, he is at the head of his class, but he has made no friends. Dick sticks it out but the admiral worries about his isolation, as one of the goals of the academy is to create bonds between the midshipmen. Coxswain flunks out of school and castigates Dick for his attitude. After June moves to New York to become a professional dancer, Dick is more alone than ever. June returns for the annual Ring Dance but Dick finds excuses not to allow her the tradition of placing his class ring on his finger.

During Dick's final summer cruise, Coxswain is one of the ship's crew and proudly informs his former roommates that he has been accepted for readmission to the academy. His love of the Navy makes Dick uncomfortable and he places his ring on his finger one night on deck. During gunnery training, one of the ship's steam lines bursts and starts a boiler fire. Coxswain tries to shut off the fuel leads and is overcome by smoke and fire. Although Dick tries to save him, Coxswain is killed. Both men are badly burned and Dick is recognized as the survivor by his class ring. When he finally returns to the academy, Dick is greeted enthusiastically by his classmates. He proudly leads the Brigade of Midshipmen at the graduation parade, about to become a new ensign.

== Cast ==
- Dick Powell as Richard John 'Dick' Melville III
- Ruby Keeler as June Blackburn
- Lewis Stone as Adm. Richard Melville
- Ross Alexander as Lafayette 'Sparks' Brown
- Eddie Acuff as Lincoln 'Cowboy'
- Dick Foran as Gifford
- John Arledge as Johnny 'Coxswain' Lawrence
- Robert Light as Ted Sterling
- Arline Pretty as Nurse (uncredited)

== Critical reception ==
Frank S. Nugent of the The New York Times gave a positive review, and wrote, "Briskly directed by Frank Borzage and strong in its supporting cast, the new photoplay is less aggressively sanctimonious in its treatment of the service than most of the other Warner Stars-and-Stripes pictures." Noting the similarity in storyline to several naval-themed films, and citing Flirtation Walk and Here Comes the Navy as examples, Nugent wrote that Shipmates Forever "may be recommended. Certainly it is the best of the recent naval cycle."

Variety also noted the familiarity of the storyline, and commented, "The peacetlme milltary service theme, a forte now on the Warner's lot, gets a thorough and brisk golng over in Shipmates Forever. It has most of the ingredlents of previous similar successes, including practically the same story with only the names changed." It wrote that Dick Powell and Ruby Keeler "are a pleasant pair" and "Frank Borzage knitted his story with utmost finesse."

Modern Screen gave the film a four-star review, noting its "humor and spirit" and commenting "it turns out to be one of the better Powell-Keeler offerings. For one thing Dick (Powell) is learning to act, and although we may be called old-fashioned for it, we always say acting helps a picture."
