= Brother, Cry for Me =

1970 film

- VHS cover
- Directed by: William White
- Produced by: Hubie Kerns
- Starring: Steve Drexel; Larry Pennell; Richard Davalos; Leslie Parrish; Anthony Caruso
- Edited by: Andrew Herbert; Ed Hunt; Carl Monson
- Music by: Jaime Mendoza-Nava
- Distributed by: Troma Entertainment
- Release date: 1970
- Running time: 95 minutes
- Country: United States
- Language: English

Brother, Cry for Me is a 1970 adventure film starring Leslie Parrish, Larry Pennell and Richard Davalos. Produced by International Center Productions, the film was acquired by Troma Entertainment for hard media and streaming distribution. The film, initially released in the U.S between January and March 1970, is Rated G.

== Plot ==
Three estranged brothers receive a letter from their late father inviting them to collect a large inheritance in an Aztec pyramid. Realizing that they each have a chance at their father's fortune, the brothers become murderously competitive.

== Background ==
The film served as the feature film producer debut for stuntman Hubie Kerns, best known for his work as Adam West’s stunt double on Batman. It was also an early, feature film directing effort for television actor William White, best known for his repeat appearances on The Adventures of Ozzie & Harriet. As a film actor, White appeared in The Hideous Sun Demon (1959) and The Human Duplicators (1965).

The next film by Kerns and White, as producer and assistant director, respectively, The Date, began production in 1970. The film starred Stafford Rapp and co-starred Burt Ward, both of television’s Batman. After a failed release in 1973, the film was retitled as Scream, Evelyn, Scream (1977) for another planned release; again, the film was never officially released and is considered lost.

Kerns and White also produced the films Where the Red Fern Grows (1974) and the adventure western, Seven Alone (1974).

== Reviews ==
In a contemporary review at Every '70s Movie, Peter Hanson critiqued the film as "an incoherent mess . . . every frame look[s] cheap and oversaturated and ugly," and that the film was infused with "amateurism."
