= William White (actor) =

American film director (1921–1985)

- Born: William Hampton White; June 25, 1921; Missouri, United States
- Died: July 14, 1985 (aged 64); Sherman Oaks, California
- Other names: William H. White, Bill White, Bill Hampton, Billy Hampton
- Occupations: Actor, director, producer
- Years active: 1927–1984

William White (June 25, 1921 – July 14, 1985) was a film producer and actor. The films he has been involved with in production include Where's Willie?, and House of the Black Death. He also directed Brother, Cry for Me, and Divorce Las Vegas Style.

== Background ==
White was born in Missouri on June 25, 1921. He died of a heart attack on July 14, 1985, in Sherman Oaks, California.

Actor Jeff F. Renfro who played the psychotic trucker in The Bunny Game is his stepson.

== Career ==
=== Actor ===
White had an involvement in films and television from 1927 to the late 1970s. He had an early role playing the butcher boy in Peaceful Oscar which was released around 1927. Later he had a role in the William Clemens directed Here Comes Carter which was released in 1936. He played the part of Police Lt. Peterson in the 1959 horror film, The Hideous Sun Demon. The film which was directed by Tom Boutross and Robert Clarke, featured Nan Peterson, Del Courtney, Tony Hilder, and Bob Hafner. During the 1960s, one film he appeared in was Terror of the Bloodhunters. Released in 1963, the film starred Robert Clarke and Dorothy Haney. Other films in that decade were Attack of the Mayan Mummy in 1964, and The Human Duplicators in 1965. It's likely his last acting work was as Jesse in the "Ace in the Hole" episode of The Green Hornet.

=== Director and producer ===
He directed and wrote the story for Divorce Las Vegas Style, which was released in 1970. It starred John Alderman, Luanne Roberts, and Dixie Donovan. Another film he directed that was released the same year was Brother, Cry for Me, a film that starred Steve Drexel, Leslie Parrish, Larry Pennell, Richard Davalos, and Anthony Caruso. He wrote the story and co-produced Where's Willie which was released in 1978.

== Filmography (actor) ==
Film
Title	Role	Director	Year	Notes #
Peaceful Oscar	Oscar's son	Roscoe "Fatty" Arbuckle	1927	
Here Comes Carter	Office boy	William Clemens	1936	as Billy Hampton
The Hideous Sun Demon	Police Lt. Peterson	Robert Clarke; Tom Boutross	1959	as Bill Hampton
Terror of the Bloodhunters	Dione	Jerry Warren	1962	
Face of the Screaming Werewolf		Gilberto Martínez Solares; Rafael López Portillo; Jerry Warren	1964	
Attack of the Mayan Mummy		Rafael Portillo; Jerry Warren	1964	as Bill White; Tv movie
The Human Duplicators		Hugo Grimaldi; Arthur C. Pierce	1965	as Bill Hampton
Morituri		Bernhard Wicki	1965	

Television
Title	Episode	Role	Director	Year	Notes #
Gunsmoke	The Alarm at Pleasant Valley	Tad Fraser	Ted Post	1956	as Bill White Jr.
M Squad	The Widows	Mike Polka	Bernard L. Kowalski	1958	as Bill Hampton
Rescue 8	Danger in Paradise	Jeff Morse, guard	William Beaudine	1959	as Bill Hampton
Rescue 8	Death for Hire	Deputy	William Beaudine	1959	as Bill Hampton
The Betty Hutton Show	Roy Runs Away	Cabby	Robert Sidney	1960	as Bill Hampton
The Adventures of Ozzie & Harriet	David, the Sleuth	Barber	Ozzie Nelson	1959	as Bill Hampton
The Adventures of Ozzie & Harriet	The T-Shirts	Club Member	Ozzie Nelson	1960	as Bill Hampton
The Adventures of Ozzie & Harriet	Big Plans for Summer	Maitre'd	Ozzie Nelson	1960	as Bill Hampton
The Adventures of Ozzie & Harriet	No News for Harriet	Dave Bender	Ozzie Nelson	1960	as Bill Hampton
The Adventures of Ozzie & Harriet	Safe Husbands	Bowling Clerk	Ozzie Nelson	1961	as Bill Hampton
The Adventures of Ozzie & Harriet	Mr. Kelley's Important Papers	Airline Clerk	Ozzie Nelson	1961	as Bill Hampton
The Adventures of Ozzie & Harriet	The Manly arts	Store Policeman	Ozzie Nelson	1961	as Bill Hampton
The Adventures of Ozzie & Harriet	Backyard Pet Show	Ed	Ozzie Nelson	1968	as Bill Hampton
Perry Mason	The Case of the Bluffing Blast	Cab driver	Allen H. Miner	1963	as Bill Hampton
Lassie	Time for Courage		William Beaudine	1966	as Bill Hampton
The Green Hornet	Ace in the Hole	Jessie	William Beaudine	1967	as Bill Hampton

== Filmography (director, producer etc) ==
Film
Title	Role	Director	Year	Notes #
House of the Black Death	producer	Harold Daniels; Reginald LeBorg; Jerry Warren	1965	
Lady Godiva Rides	assistant director	A.C. Stephen	1969	as Bill White
Divorce Las Vegas Style	writer, director	William White	1970	
Brother, Cry for Me	producer, director	William White	1970	
Scream, Evelyn, Scream!	assistant director	Tom Anthony; Robert Hensley	1970	
The Wild Scene	production manager	William Rowland	1970	
Beautiful People	production manager	Louis Garfinkle	1971	
Where the Red Fern Grows	assistant director	Norman Tokar	1974	as William H. White
Seven Alone	second assistant director	Earl Bellamy	1974	as William H. White
Pony Express Rider	production manager	Robert Totten	1976	as William H. White
Where's Willie?	producer	John Florea	1978	as William H. White
The Red Fury	first assistant director	Lyman Dayton	1984	as Bill White

Television
Title	Episode	Role	Director	Year	Notes #
The Gong Show	unknown	assistant director	John Dorsey; Terry Kyne	1976	
