= Ma! He's Making Eyes at Me (film) =

- Theatrical release poster
- Directed by: Harold D. Schuster
- Screenplay by: Charles Grayson; Edmund Hartmann
- Story by: Ed Sullivan
- Produced by: Joseph Gershenson
- Starring: Tom Brown; Constance Moore; Richard Carle; Anne Nagel; Jerome Cowan; Elisabeth Risdon; Fritz Feld
- Cinematography: Elwood Bredell
- Edited by: Edward Curtiss
- Production company: Universal Pictures
- Distributed by: Universal Pictures
- Release date: March 15, 1940
- Running time: 61 minutes
- Country: United States
- Language: English

Ma! He's Making Eyes at Me is a 1940 American comedy film directed by Harold D. Schuster and written by Charles Grayson and Edmund Hartmann. The film stars Tom Brown, Constance Moore, Richard Carle, Anne Nagel, Jerome Cowan, Elisabeth Risdon and Fritz Feld. The film was released on March 15, 1940, by Universal Pictures.

== Cast ==
- Tom Brown as Tommy Shaw
- Constance Moore as Connie Curtiss
- Richard Carle as C. J. Woodbury
- Anne Nagel as Miss Lansdale
- Jerome Cowan as Ted Carter
- Elisabeth Risdon as Minerva
- Fritz Feld as Forsythe
- Larry Williams as Joe Porter
- Frank Mitchell as Frank
- Vivien Fay as Vivien
- Marie Greene as Marie
