= Three Legionnaires =

1937 film

- Directed by: Hamilton MacFadden
- Written by: Carl Harbaugh; George Waggner
- Produced by: Robert E. Welsh
- Starring: Robert Armstrong; Lyle Talbot; Fifi D'Orsay; Anne Nagel
- Cinematography: Ira H. Morgan
- Edited by: Finn Ulback
- Production company: General Pictures Corporation
- Distributed by: General Pictures Corporation
- Release date: 11 July 1937
- Running time: 65 minutes
- Country: United States
- Language: English

Three Legionnaires is a 1937 American comedy adventure film directed by Hamilton MacFadden and starring Robert Armstrong, Lyle Talbot, Fifi D'Orsay and Anne Nagel. It was produced by the independent General Pictures Corporation as a second feature. While the company announced a production schedule of five films, this is the only one that was ever made.

== Synopsis ==
At the end of World War I, two American soldiers stationed in Siberia find themselves part of a mission confronting like Bolshevik forces. They rescue Sonia, a White Russian princess and hide her from their enemies. She latter correctly identifies a man posing as the Cossack General Stavinski as Bolshevik in disguise. They have to fend off distracting charms of a local temptress Olga and convince a visiting Iowa schoolteacher to pose as the commander of a fictitious American relief force.

== Cast ==
- Robert Armstrong as Sergeant Chuck Connors
- Lyle Talbot as Private Jimmy Barton
- Fifi D'Orsay as Olga
- Anne Nagel as Sonia
- Donald Meek as Uriah S. Grant
- Man Mountain Dean as Ivan
- Stanley Fields as General Stavinski
- Maurice Black as General Stavinski's aide
- Leonid Snegoff as Innkeeper
- Lloyd Ingraham as Russian Street Singer
- Tom London as Joe- Motorcycle Military Policeman

== Bibliography ==
- Goble, Alan. The Complete Index to Literary Sources in Film. Walter de Gruyter, 1999.
- Munden, Kenneth White. The American Film Institute Catalog of Motion Pictures Produced in the United States, Part 1. University of California Press, 1997.
