= Anne Nagel =

American actress (1915–1966)

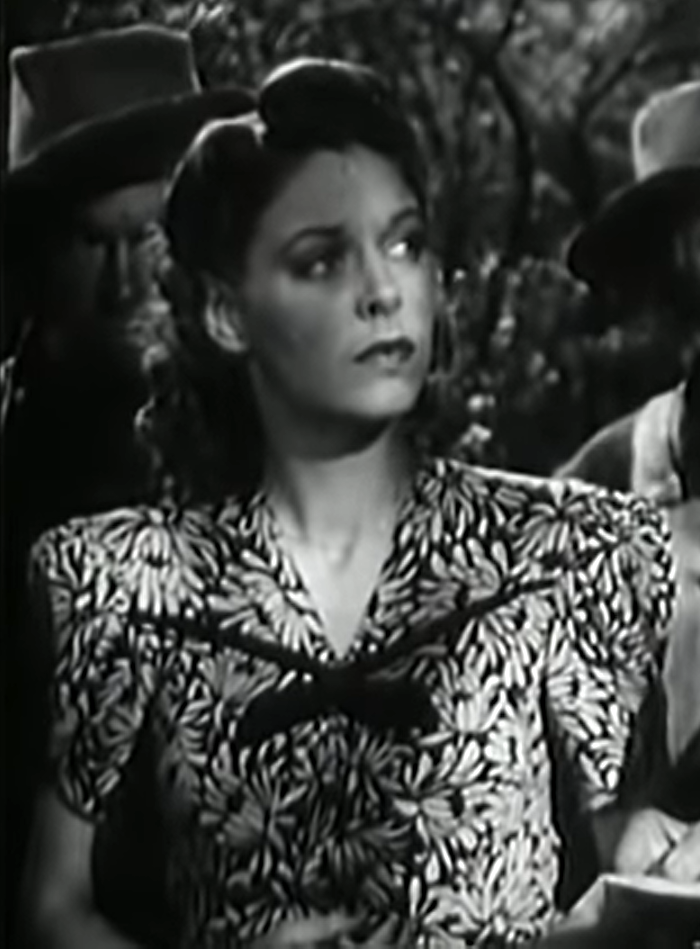
- Nagel in The Mad Monster (1942)
- Born: Anna Marie Dolan; September 29, 1915; Malden, Massachusetts, U.S.
- Died: July 6, 1966 (aged 50); Los Angeles, California, U.S.
- Resting place: Holy Cross Cemetery, Culver City, California
- Other name: Ann Nagel
- Occupation: Actress
- Years active: 1932–1957
- Spouses: Ross Alexander (m. 1936; died 1937) Lt. Col. James H. Keenan (m. 1941; div. 1951)

Anne Nagel (born Anna Marie Dolan; September 29, 1915 – July 6, 1966) was an American actress. She played in adventures, mysteries, and comedies for 25 years. She also appeared in television series in the 1950s. One book described her as "one of Hollywood's true hard-luck gals".

== Early life ==
Born in Malden, Massachusetts, (Note: An Associated Press story about Nagel's filing papers to marry Keenan states "The actress...listed her maiden name as Anna Marie Donan, born in Malden, a Boston suburb...") Nagel was enrolled by her parents in Notre Dame Academy, with the expectation that she would become a nun. Membership in the Shubert Theatre company turned her away from religious life. In the meantime, Nagel's mother had divorced and re-married. When Nagel's new stepfather, Curtis Nagel, a Technicolor expert, was hired by Tiffany Pictures in Hollywood, he moved the family to California, where he employed his step-daughter in several experimental Technicolor shorts he had been asked to direct.

== Career ==
In 1932 Nagel secured a bit part as a ballet girl in the Mack Sennett comedy feature Hypnotized, her "first documented feature credit". She was one of 14 young women "launched on the trail of film stardom" August 6, 1935, when they each received a six-month contract with 20th Century Fox after spending 18 months in the company's training school. The contracts included a studio option for renewal for as long as seven years. Nagel spent the next few years making uncredited appearances as a dancer or chorus girl.

In 1936, she signed with Warner Bros. and followed the usual path for young actresses under studio contract: incidental roles in major features, featured roles in minor features, and ingenue roles in westerns. She appeared in Here Comes Carter with Warner leading man Ross Alexander; they were married that year. A reviewer wrote "she was just one of those girls who has learned to croon for the microphone, and let the rest of the world go hang".

Warner did not pick up her option after one year, and she began freelancing. Most of her appearances in 1937 and 1938 were for Monogram Pictures, where she usually played leads.

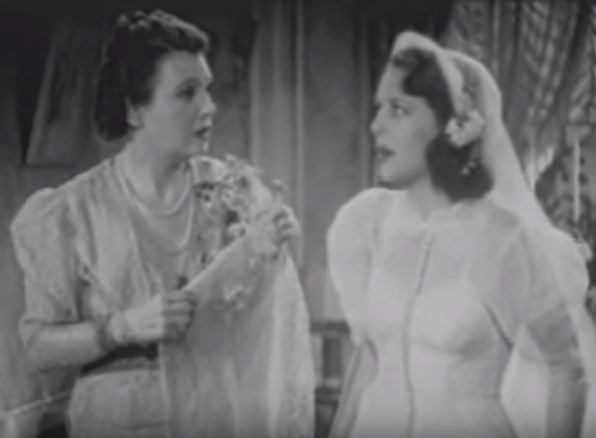
Betty Ross Clarke and Anne Nagel in A Bride for Henry (1937)

Anne Nagel was signed by Universal Pictures in 1939, and worked there steadily for four years. Her most famous Universal credits are probably the W.C. Fields comedy Never Give a Sucker an Even Break (1941, as Gloria Jean's movie-stuntwoman mother) and the serials The Green Hornet (1940) and The Green Hornet Strikes Again! (1941), reprising her radio role of Lenore Case. She also was featured in Black Friday (1940), The Invisible Woman (1940), and Man Made Monster (1941), among many other films.

From 1942 she worked mostly for the lower-budget independent companies: PRC, Monogram, Republic. She had two assignments with Columbia, the 1943 serial The Secret Code and the 1947 comedy feature Blondie's Holiday. By the late 1940s her roles were smaller and she often worked without screen credit. Nagel later worked on television in episodes of The Range Rider (1951) and Circus Boy (1957).

== Radio ==
Vintage-radio buffs best know Anne Nagel as Britt Reid's confidante Lenore Case in The Green Hornet. In 1943, she was the vocalist on the audience-participation musical quiz program Scramby Amby.

== Personal life and death ==
On September 17, 1936, Nagel married actor Ross Alexander, who committed suicide in 1937 (Note: Alexander "... went into his Van Nuys barn and reportedly fired a rifle into his mouth as his bride of four months sat quietly knitting in the house".) when beset with heavy financial burdens he could not resolve.

Four years later, Nagel married Air Force Lt. Col. James H. Keenan on December 4, 1941. The marriage ended in divorce on May 22, 1951.

In December 1947, Nagel filed a lawsuit in Superior Court against Hollywood physician and surgeon Franklyn Thorpe (former husband of actress Mary Astor). In the suit, Nagel demanded $350,000 in damages and alleged that, while performing an appendectomy on her in 1936, Thorpe had removed other organs without her knowledge or consent, rendering her infertile. Nagel claimed she was unaware of her infertility until January 1947, but Thorpe countered that she was "well aware of the nature of the surgery".

Nagel died at Sunray North Convalescent Hospital in Hollywood, California in 1966, aged 50, following surgery for liver cancer. She is buried, with no marker, in Holy Cross Cemetery in Culver City, California.

== Filmography ==
Film
Year	Title	Role	Notes
1932	Hypnotized	Ballerina / Performer	Uncredited
1933	I Loved You Wednesday	Ruby - the Hat Check Girl	Uncredited
1933	College Humor	Student	Uncredited
1933	Sitting Pretty	Girl at Window	Uncredited
1934	Coming Out Party	Suzanne	Uncredited
1934	Stand Up and Cheer!	Dancer	Uncredited
1935	George White's 1935 Scandals	Chorine	Uncredited
1935	Redheads on Parade	Queen of Redheads	Uncredited
1935	Music Is Magic	Chorine	Uncredited
1935	Everybody's Old Man	Clerk	Uncredited
1936	Bullets or Ballots	Bank secretary	Uncredited
1936	Hot Money	Ruth McElniney	
1936	China Clipper	Secretary	
1936	Love Begins at 20	Miss Perkins - Ramp's Secretary	
1936	Guns of the Pecos	Alice Burton	
1936	Down the Stretch	Hat Check Girl	Uncredited
1936	Here Comes Carter	Linda Warren	
1936	Polo Joe	Girl at Polo Field	Uncredited
1936	King of Hockey	Kathleen O'Rourke	
1937	The Case of the Stuttering Bishop	Janice Alma Brownley	
1937	Hoosier Schoolboy	Mary Evans	Top billing with Mickey Rooney
1937	Three Legionnaires	Sonia	
1937	The Devil's Saddle Legion	Karan Ordley	
1937	The Footloose Heiress	Linda Pierson	
1937	Escape by Night	Linda Adams	
1937	A Bride for Henry	Sheila Curtis	Starring opposite Warren Hull
1937	The Adventurous Blonde	Grace Brown	
1937	She Loved a Fireman	Girl at Dance	Uncredited
1938	Saleslady	Mary Dakin Spencer	
1938	Mystery House	Gwen Kingery	
1938	Under the Big Top	Penelope (AKA Penny)	
1938	Gang Bullets	Patricia Wayne	
1939	Convict's Code	Julie Warren	
1939	Should a Girl Marry?	Margaret	
1939	Unexpected Father	Beulah - showgirl	
1939	The Witness Vanishes	Laura the Secretary	Uncredited
1939	Call a Messenger	Frances O'Neill	
1939	Legion of Lost Flyers	Paula Wilson	
1940	The Green Hornet	Lenore "Casey" Case	13-chapter Serial
1940	My Little Chickadee	Miss Ermingarde Foster - Schoolteacher	Uncredited
1940	Black Friday	Sunny Rogers	
1940	Ma! He's Making Eyes at Me	Miss Lansdale	
1940	Hot Steel	Rita Martin	
1940	Winners of the West	Claire Hartford	Serial
1940	Down Argentine Way	Linda	
1940	Diamond Frontier	Jeanne Kruger	
1940	Irene	Irene O’Dare	
1940	The Green Hornet Strikes Again!	Lenore Case	Serial
1940	The Invisible Woman	Jean	
1941	Meet the Chump	Miss Burke	
1941	Man Made Monster	June Lawrence	
1941	Mutiny in the Arctic	Gloria Adams	
1941	Never Give a Sucker an Even Break	Madame Gorgeous	
1941	Appointment for Love	Jennifer	Uncredited
1941	Road Agent	Lola	
1942	Sealed Lips	Mary Morton	
1942	Don Winslow of the Navy	Misty Gaye	Serial
1942	Stagecoach Buckaroo	Nina Kincaid	
1942	The Mad Doctor of Market Street	Mrs. William Saunders	
1942	The Dawn Express	Nancy Fielding	
1942	The Mad Monster	Lenora Cameron	
1942	The Secret Code	Jean Ashley	Serial
1943	Women in Bondage	Deputy District Director	Alternative title: Hitler's Women
1946	Murder in the Music Hall	Attendant at Mission	
1946	Traffic in Crime	Ann Marlowe	
1946	The Trap	Marcia	
1947	Blondie's Holiday	Bea Mason (Class of '32)	Credited as Ann Nagel
1947	The Hucksters	Teletype Operator	Uncredited
1947	The Spirit of West Point	Mrs. Blaik	
1948	Homecoming	Guest	Uncredited
1948	One Touch of Venus	Reporter	Uncredited
1948	An Innocent Affair	Gladys - Receptionist	
1948	Bungalow 13	Henrietta	Uncredited
1948	Family Honeymoon	Irene Bartlett	Uncredited
1948	Every Girl Should Be Married	Woman	Uncredited
1949	The Stratton Story	Mrs. Piet	Uncredited
1949	Mighty Joe Young	Brunette at Bar	Uncredited
1949	Prejudice	Miss Bennett	
1950	Armored Car Robbery	Mrs. Marsha Phillips	Uncredited
Television
Year	Title	Role	Notes
1951	The Range Rider	Aunt Ginny	2 episodes
1957	Circus Boy	Louisa Cody	1 episode, (final appearance)
