= West Point Light (New York) =

Lighthouse in New York, United States

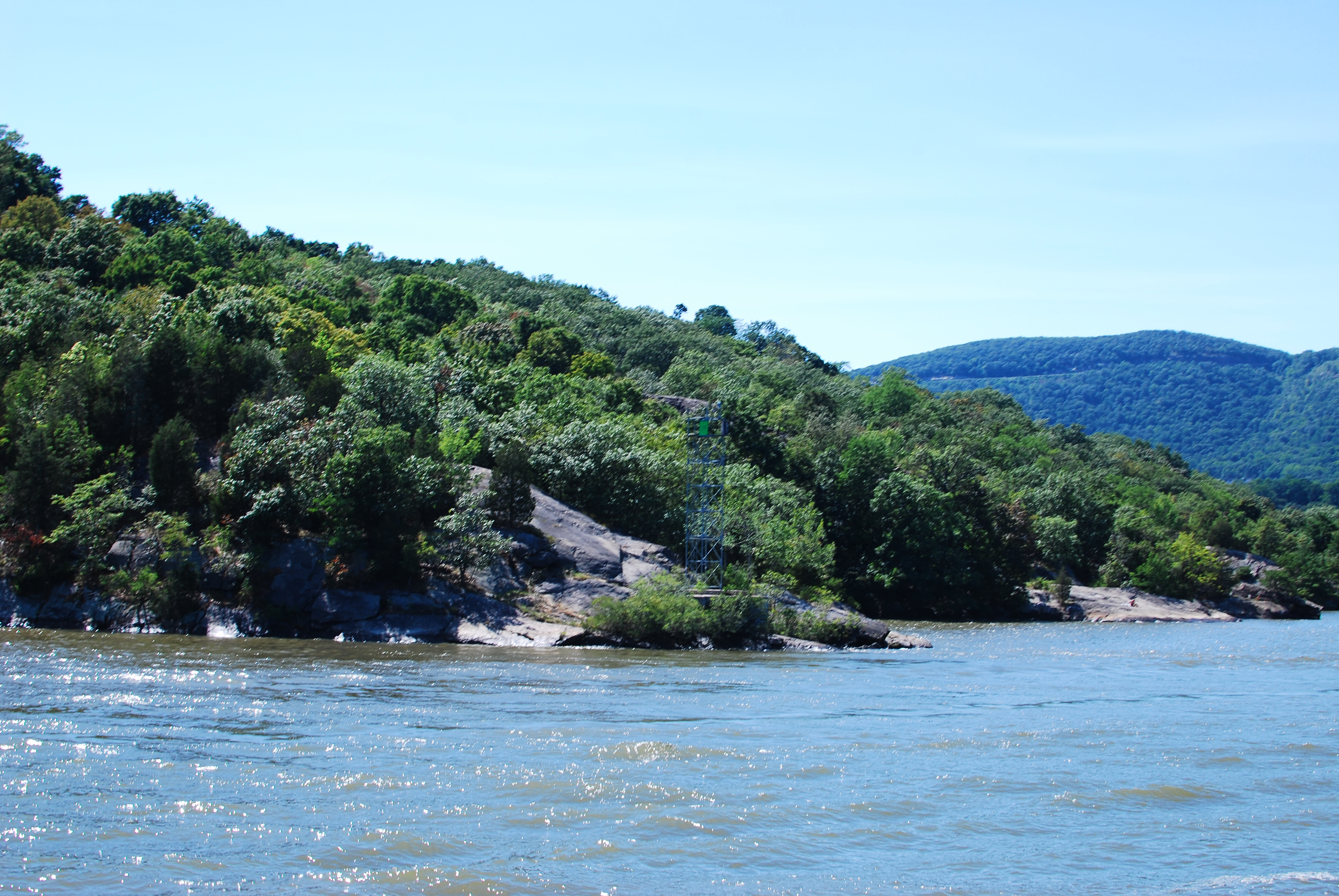
- Light #39 on Gee's Point
- Location: New York, US
- Coordinates: 41°23′45″N 73°57′3″W

Tower
- Constructed: 1853
- Construction: Wooden
- Shape: Square
- Markings: White

Light
- Deactivated: 1946
- Focal height: 40 ft (12 m)
- Lens: Sixth order Fresnel lens
- Characteristic: Fixed white

West Point Light was a lighthouse at the United States Military Academy in West Point, New York. It was located at Gee's Point and was sometimes referred to as Gee's Point Light.

West Point Light would be shown on the NOAA Chart 12343 if it were still active. Today, Light 39 (USCG 1-38005), on a skeleton tower with a fixed green light characteristic, has replaced West Point Light on Gee's Point.

== History ==
West Point, 45 miles (72 km) above the Battery, is the site of the United States Military Academy. The northeastern extremity of West Point descends to a rocky point, upon the extremity of which was West Point lighthouse. On the opposite side of the river and north of West Point is Constitution Island; the bend between the two is locally known as Worlds End, and has very deep water of 36 fathoms (216 ft; 66 m).

A little above Constitution Island, on the west bank of the river, is a steep, rocky, wooded hill 1,396 feet (426 m) high, known as Crow's Nest, and just above it is a prominent hill 1,340 feet (410 m) high known as Storm King Mountain.

West Point is a high, bluff thickly wooded point, almost entirely occupied by the grounds and buildings of the United States Military Academy. On the northeast it descends to a bare rocky point, upon the extremity of which stood a low square wooden tower, painted white. This was West Point Lighthouse.

== Cultural ==
The Archives Center at the Smithsonian National Museum of American History has a collection (#1055) of souvenir postcards of lighthouses and has digitized 272 of these and made them available online. These include postcards of West Point Light (New York) with links to customized nautical charts provided by the National Oceanographic and Atmospheric Administration.
