= Flirtation Walk (film) =

1934 film by Frank Borzage, Bobby Connelly

- Theatrical release poster
- Directed by: Frank Borzage
- Screenplay by: Delmer Daves
- Story by: Delmer Daves; Lou Edelman
- Produced by: Robert Lord
- Starring: Dick Powell; Ruby Keeler; Pat O'Brien
- Cinematography: Sol Polito; George Barnes
- Edited by: William Holmes
- Music by: Allie Wrubel; Mort Dixon
- Production company: First National Pictures
- Distributed by: First National Pictures (through Warner Bros. Pictures)
- Release date: November 28, 1934
- Running time: 85, 95, 97, or 100 minutes
- Country: United States
- Language: English
- Budget: $479,000
- Box office: $1,533,000

Flirtation Walk is a 1934 American romantic musical film written by Delmer Daves and Lou Edelman and directed by Frank Borzage. The film's title refers to a path near the Trophy Point scenic overlook in West Point, New York named Flirtation Walk, where cadets often take dance dates for some time alone.

== Plot ==
Richard Palmer Grant Dorcy Jr., also known as "the Canary" and "the singing bird of the tropics," is an enlisted man in the United States Army. Stationed in the Hawaiian Islands, he has a contentious but friendly relationship with his sergeant, Scrapper Thornhill. When General Fitts visits the post with his daughter Kit on their way to Manila, Dick is assigned to drive her to a reception that evening. Falling victim to the moonlit night, Kit and Dick attend a luau instead, and he sings "Aloha ‘Oe". They are discovered in each other's arms by Scrapper and Lieutenant Biddle, who is also in love with Kit. Biddle accuses Dick of ruining Kit's reputation and forcing her to accompany him off post. Dick decides to desert. Scrapper begs Kit to reconcile with Biddle.

To prevent Dick from deserting, Kit tells him that she was responding to a crazy impulse and that he means nothing to her. Stung by her words, and Biddle's condescending statement that "if you were an officer and a gentleman, you'd understand," Dick decides to compete with Biddle as an equal and applies for admission to the United States Military Academy. He is accepted and fares very well, to Scrapper's delight. In his first year, Dick becomes a first captain and General Fitts is appointed the academy's superintendent, with Biddle as his aide. While most of his classmates are infatuated with Kit, Dick is cold to her. He is unhappy when the men insist that she participate in the traditional "Hundredth Night" theatrical performance that he is to direct.

Dick writes a comedy about a female general with a message directed at Kit. After the first rehearsal, Kit walks with Dick on Flirtation Walk and tries to explain why she told him that she was not in love with him. Dick is too angry to listen to Kit, but during their on-stage love scene kisses her, and she admits that she loves him. Near graduation, General Fitts announces Kit's engagement to Biddle, and Dick is confused. He visits her at night in an attempt to dissuade her from marrying Biddle. He is caught by Biddle and agrees to resign from the academy to protect Kit's name. Scrapper arrives to see Dick graduate and is disappointed to learn of his resignation. The day is saved when Biddle tells Dick that his resignation was not accepted and that Kit returned his ring, wishing him good luck. Dick graduates as a happy man.

== Cast ==
- Dick Powell as Dick "Canary" Dorcy
- Ruby Keeler as "Kit" Fitts
- Pat O'Brien as "Scrapper" Thornhill
- Ross Alexander as "Oskie"
- John Arledge as "Spike"
- John Eldredge as Lieut. Biddle
- Henry O'Neill as Gen. Fitts
- Guinn Williams as "Sleepy"
- Frederick Burton as Gen. Landacre
- John Darrow as Chase
- Glen Boles as "Eight Ball"

== Production ==
Much of the film was shot on location at West Point. Bobby Connolly began to film the Hawaiian number on July 3, 1934, and was scheduled to finish on July 10. The set was the largest ever built at Warner Bros. Pictures. Following completion of the number, Connolly started the military wedding number using more than 400 dancers.

The success of the film led Warner Bros. to combine Powell, Keeler, Alexander and Arledge again with Borzage and Daves with similar plot and characters for Shipmates Forever, a film about the United States Naval Academy, the following year.

== Reception ==
In a contemporary review for The New York Times, critic Andre Sennwald called Flirtation Walk "a rousing recruiting poster" and wrote: "[T]he Academy background has been woven into the picture with a great sum of sheer skill, and the photoplay emerges as a pleasant conventional comedy, as well as a splendid laboratory specimen of the adolescent cinema."

In the Los Angeles Times, critic Edwin Schallert wrote: "The general character of the production is good, and certainly the fine sense of romance that always distinguished the directing of Borzage shines through. He is on solid ground whenever he deals with a subject of forlorn love like this."

According to Warner Bros. records, the film earned $1,062,000 domestically and $471,000 internationally.

Excerpts of the production, including the ending, are used in the 2001 film The Wedding Planner.

== Awards and honors ==
The film was nominated for the Academy Award for Best Picture and Best Sound Recording (Nathan Levinson).

== Songs ==
"Aloha 'Oe" (1878) by Princess Liliʻuokalani

Music and lyrics by Allie Wrubel and Mort Dixon:

- "Flirtation Walk"
- "I See Two Lovers"
- "Mr. and Mrs. Is the Name"
- "When Do We Eat?"
- "Smoking in the Dark"
- "No Horse, No Wife, No Mustache"
